= Dionne Warwick discography =

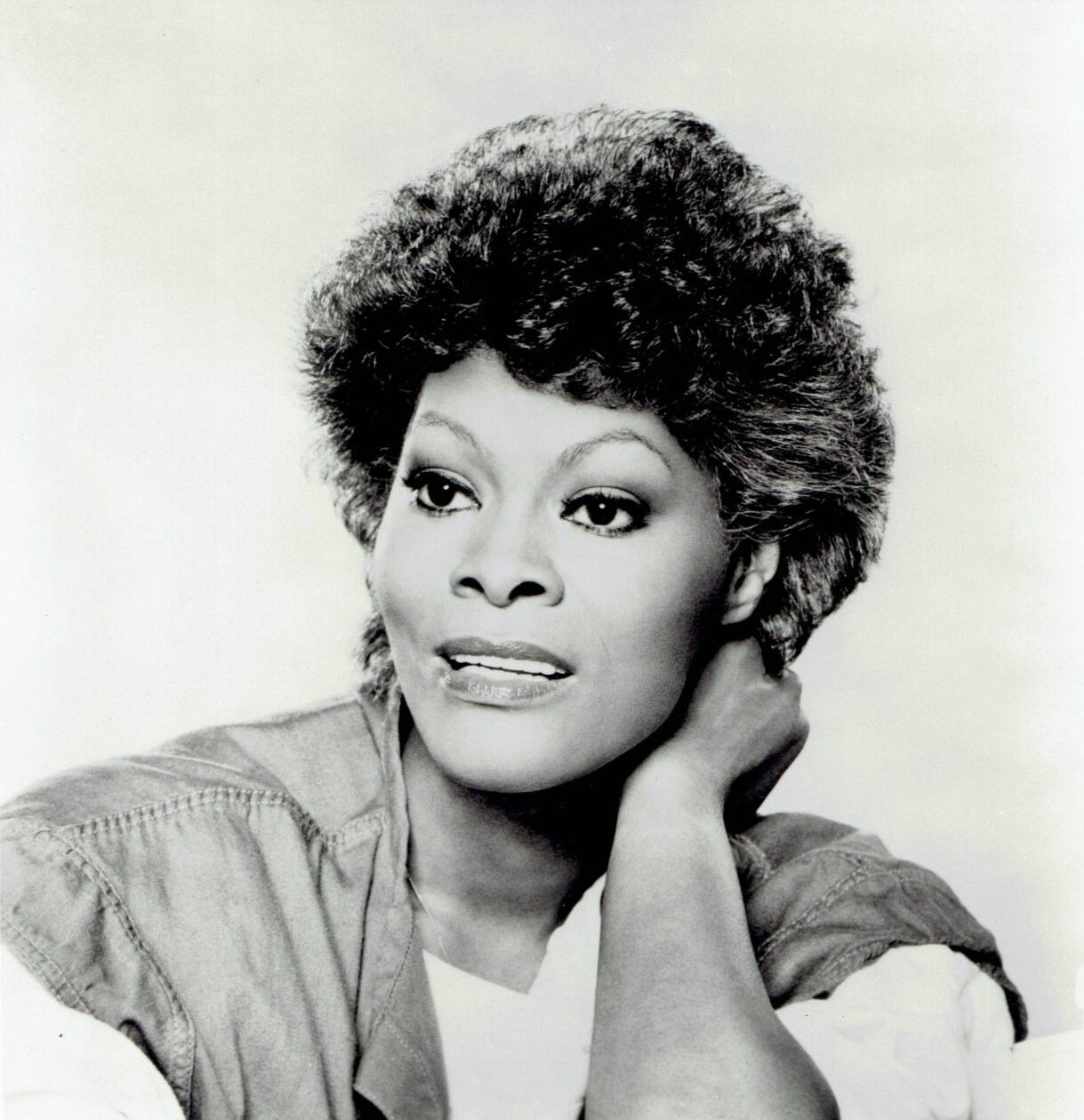
- Studio albums: 40
- Live albums: 5
- Compilation albums: 25
- Singles: 96

Dionne Warwick is an American singer. She has charted 56 times on the US Billboard Hot 100 singles chart, making her the second-most charted female vocalist during the rock era (1955–2010), after Aretha Franklin. Warwick has sold over 100 million records worldwide. She has charted 18 songs in the top 20 of the US Hot 100 and charted several more hits inside the top 40 (31).

Dionne Warwick reached the number one spot twice on the Billboard Hot 100, both times for collaborations. "Then Came You" with The Spinners hit number one in 1974, and "That's What Friends Are For" with Elton John, Gladys Knight, and Stevie Wonder earned the top spot in 1986.

== Albums ==
=== Studio albums ===
Title	Details	Peak chart positions								Certifications
Title	Details	US	US R&B	AUS	CAN	GER	NL	NZ	UK	Certifications
Presenting Dionne Warwick	Released: February 10, 1963; Label: Scepter	—	—	—	—	—	—	—	14	
Anyone Who Had a Heart	Released: February 17, 1964; Label: Scepter	—	—	—	—	—	—	—	—	
Make Way for Dionne Warwick	Released: August 31, 1964; Label: Scepter	68	10	—	—	—	—	—	—	
The Sensitive Sound of Dionne Warwick	Released: February 15, 1965; Label: Scepter	107	—	—	—	—	—	—	—	
Here I Am	Released: December 21, 1965; Label: Scepter	45	3	—	—	—	—	—	—	
Here Where There Is Love	Released: December 4, 1966; Label: Scepter	18	1	—	—	—	—	—	39	RIAA: Gold
On Stage and in the Movies	Released: May 14, 1967; Label: Scepter	169	11	—	—	—	—	—	—	
The Windows of the World	Released: August 31, 1967; Label: Scepter	22	11	—	—	—	—	—	—	
Dionne Warwick in Valley of the Dolls	Released: March 23, 1968; Label: Scepter	6	2	—	—	—	—	—	10	RIAA: Gold
The Magic of Believing (with The Drinkard Singers)	Released: June 1968; Label: Scepter	—	49	—	—	—	—	—	—	
Promises, Promises	Released: November 1968; Label: Scepter	18	7	—	15	—	—	—	—	
Soulful	Released: April 1969; Label: Scepter	11	2	—	16	—	—	—	—	
I'll Never Fall in Love Again	Released: April 27, 1970; Label: Scepter	23	7	13	31	—	—	—	—	
Very Dionne	Released: December 1970; Label: Scepter	37	8	—	35	—	—	—	—	
Dionne	Released: 1972; Label: Warner Bros.	54	22	—	—	—	—	—	—	
Just Being Myself	Released: 1973; Label: Warner Bros.	178	—	—	—	—	—	—	—	
Then Came You	Released: 1975; Label: Warner Bros.	167	35	—	—	—	—	—	—	
Track of the Cat	Released: 1975; Label: Warner Bros.	137	15	—	—	—	—	—	—	
Love at First Sight	Released: 1977; Label: Warner Bros.	—	—	—	—	—	—	—	—	
Dionne	Released: May 1979; Label: Arista	12	10	35	30	—	—	—	—	RIAA: Platinum
No Night So Long	Released: July 18, 1980; Label: Arista	23	22	98	73	—	—	—	—	
Friends in Love	Released: April 14, 1982; Label: Arista	83	33	72	—	—	—	—	—	
Heartbreaker	Released: September 28, 1982; Label: Arista	25	13	14	—	18	5	32	3	RIAA: Gold; BPI: Platinum; NVPI: Gold
How Many Times Can We Say Goodbye	Released: September 29, 1983; Label: Arista	57	19	—	—	—	—	—	60	
Finder of Lost Loves	Released: January 24, 1985; Label: Arista	106	50	—	—	—	—	—	86	
Friends	Released: November 25, 1985; Label: Arista	12	8	29	16	—	—	—	—	RIAA: Gold; MC: Gold
Reservations for Two	Released: July 30, 1987; Label: Arista	56	32	—	87	—	—	—	—	
Dionne Warwick Sings Cole Porter	Released: June 11, 1990; Label: Arista	155	—	108	—	—	—	—	—	
Friends Can Be Lovers	Released: January 20, 1993; Label: Arista	—	84	193	—	—	—	—	—	
Aquarela do Brasil	Released: October 18, 1994; Label: Arista	—	—	122	—	—	—	—	—	
Dionne Sings Dionne	Released: October 6, 1998; Label: River North	—	—	—	—	—	—	—	—	
Dionne Sings Dionne, Vol. 2	Released: August 2, 2000; Label: Victor	—	—	—	—	—	—	—	—	
My Favorite Time of the Year	Released: October 26, 2004; Label: DMI	—	—	—	—	—	—	—	—	
My Friends & Me	Released: November 7, 2006; Label: Concord	—	66	—	—	—	—	—	—	
Why We Sing	Released: January 28, 2008; Label: Rhino	—	—	—	—	—	—	—	—	
Only Trust Your Heart	Released: March 15, 2011; Label: MPCA, RED	—	—	—	—	—	—	—	—	
Now	Released: November 6, 2012; Label: H&I	—	—	—	—	—	—	—	57	
Feels So Good	Released: October 27, 2014; Label: Bright Music	—	—	—	—	—	—	—	—	
She's Back	Released: May 17, 2019; Label: Kind, eOne	—	—	—	—	—	—	—	—	
Dionne Warwick & the Voices of Christmas	Released: October 19, 2019; Label: Kind, BMG	—	—	—	—	—	—	—	—	
"—" denotes a recording that did not chart or was not released in that territory.

=== Live albums ===
Title	Details	Peak chart positions						Certifications
Title	Details	US	US R&B	AUS	CAN	GER	UK	Certifications
Dionne Warwick in Paris	Released: 1966; Label: Scepter	76	3	—	—	—	14	
The Dionne Warwicke Story: A Decade of Gold	Released: 1971; Label: Scepter	48	16	—	39	—	—	RIAA: Gold
A Man and a Woman (with Isaac Hayes)	Released: 1977; Label: ABC	49	20	66	71	—	—	
Hot! Live and Otherwise	Released: May 20, 1981; Label: Arista	72	35	—	—	—	—	
Christmas in Vienna II (with Plácido Domingo)	Released: 1994; Label: Sony	—	—	—	—	34	60	NVPI: Platinum
"—" denotes a recording that did not chart or was not released in that territory.

=== Compilation albums ===
Title	Details	Peak chart positions						Certifications
Title	Details	US	US R&B	AUS	CAN	NZ	UK	Certifications
The Best of Dionne Warwick	Released: 1966; Label: Pye	—	—	—	—	—	8	
Dionne Warwick's Golden Hits, Part One	Released: 1967; Label: Scepter	10	3	—	—	—	—	RIAA: Gold
Dionne Warwick's Greatest Motion Picture Hits	Released: 1969; Label: Scepter	31	10	—	15	—	—	
Dionne Warwick's Golden Hits, Pt. 2	Released: 1969; Label: Scepter	28	9	—	33	—	—	
The Greatest Hits of Dionne Warwick, Vol. 1	Released: 1970; Label: Wand	—	—	—	—	—	31	
The Greatest Hits of Dionne Warwick, Vol. 2	Released: 1970; Label: Wand	—	—	5	—	—	28	BPI: Silver
Go with Love: Dionne Warwick Sings the Songs of Burt Bacharach and Hal David	Released: 1970; Label: Scepter	—	—	—	—	—	—	
From Within	Released: 1972; Label: Scepter	169	—	—	—	—	—	
The Dionne Warwick Collection	Released: 1976; Label: Pickwick	—	—	—	—	—	—	BPI: Silver
Forever Gold	Released: 1976; Label: Scepter	—	—	—	—	—	—	
Only Love Can Break a Heart	Released: 1977; Label: Musicor	188	—	—	—	—	—	
20 Greatest Hits	Released: 1982; Label: J&B	—	—	15	—	—	—	
The Collection	Released: 1983; Label: Arista	—	—	—	—	—	11	BPI: Gold
The Love Songs	Released: 1989; Label: Arista	—	—	—	—	—	6	BPI: Silver
The Dionne Warwick Collection: Her All-Time Greatest Hits	Released: 1989; Label: Rhino	—	—	—	—	—	—	
Greatest Hits: 1979–1990	Released: 1989; Label: Arista	177	—	168	—	—	—	
Hidden Gems: The Best of Dionne Warwick, Vol. 2	Released: 1992; Label: Rhino	—	—	—	—	—	—	
Dionne Warwick Sings the Bacharach & David Songbook	Released: 1994; Label: Music Club	—	—	—	—	—	—	ARIA: Gold; BPI: Gold
The Best of Dionne Warwick	Released: 1995	—	—	148	—	—	—	
The Essential Collection	Released: 1996; Label: Global TV	—	—	—	—	—	58	BPI: Silver
The Definitive Collection	Released: 1999; Label: Arista	—	—	—	—	—	—	
The Very Best of Dionne Warwick	Released: 2000; Label: Rhino	—	—	—	—	—	—	
Heartbreaker - The Very Best of Dionne Warwick	Released: 2002; Label: WEA	—	—	—	—	—	32	BPI: Silver
The Essential Dionne Warwick	Released: 2003; Label: Warner Australia	—	—	81	—	—	—	
Walk On By: The Very Best of Dionne Warwick	Released: 2006; Label: Sony BMG	—	—	—	—	—	72	
The Love Collection	Released: 2008; Label: Sony BMG	—	—	26	—	11	27	
"—" denotes a recording that did not chart or was not released in that territory.

== Singles ==
=== 1960s ===
List of singles, with selected chart positions and certifications, showing other relevant details
Title	Year	Peak chart positions									Certifications	Album
Title	Year	US	US R&B	US AC	AUS	CAN	CAN AC	GER	NL	UK	Certifications	Album
"Don't Make Me Over"	1962	21	5	—	—	38	—	—	—	—		Presenting Dionne Warwick
"This Empty Place"	1963	84	26	—	—	—	—	—	—	—		Presenting Dionne Warwick
"Make the Music Play"	1963	81	—	—	—	—	—	—	—	—		Presenting Dionne Warwick
"Anyone Who Had a Heart"	1963	8	6	2	11	11	—	42	5	42		Anyone Who Had a Heart
"Walk On By"	1964	6	1	7	28	5	—	—	—	9	BPI: Silver	Make Way for Dionne Warwick
"You'll Never Get to Heaven (If You Break My Heart)"	1964	34	10	—	32	15	—	—	—	20		Make Way for Dionne Warwick
"Reach Out for Me"	1964	20	1	—	43	12	—	—	—	23		Make Way for Dionne Warwick
"Who Can I Turn To"	1965	62	36	—	—	31	—	—	—	—		The Sensitive Sound of Dionne Warwick
"You Can Have Him"	1965	75	—	—	81	—	—	—	—	37		The Sensitive Sound of Dionne Warwick
"Here I Am"	1965	65	—	11	—	19	—	—	—	—		Here I Am
"Looking with My Eyes"	1965	64	38	—	—	—	—	—	—	—		Here I Am
"Are You There (With Another Girl)"	1965	39	35	—	54	13	—	—	—	—		Here I Am
"Message to Michael"	1966	8	5	12	44	6	—	—	—	55 (Note: Chart position is from the official UK "Breakers List".)		Dionne Warwick in Paris
"Trains and Boats and Planes"	1966	22	49	37	88	18	—	—	—	—		Here Where There Is Love
"I Just Don't Know What to Do with Myself"	1966	26	20	—	90	36	—	—	—	—		Here Where There Is Love
"Another Night"	1966	49	47	—	70	30	—	—	—	—		The Windows of the World
"The Beginning of Loneliness"	1967	79	44	—	—	—	—	—	—	—		The Windows of the World
"The Windows of the World"	1967	32	27	32	—	20	4	—	—	—		The Windows of the World
"I Say a Little Prayer"	1967	4	8	—	77	4	—	—	—	—	RIAA: Gold	The Windows of the World
"Do You Know the Way to San Jose"	1968	10	23	4	15	8	—	—	—	8		Dionne Warwick in the Valley of Dolls
"Who Is Gonna Love Me"	1968	33	43	4	—	19	—	—	—	56		Promises, Promises
"Promises, Promises"	1968	19	47	7	86	8	—	—	—	—		Promises, Promises
"This Girl's in Love with You"	1969	7	7	2	17	7	6	—	—	—		Promises, Promises
"The April Fools"	1969	37	33	8	—	32	9	—	—	—		Dionne Warwick's Greatest Motion Picture Hits
"Odds and Ends"	1969	43	—	7	76	40	20	—	—	—		Non-album single
"You've Lost That Lovin' Feeling"	1969	16	13	10	26	12	10	—	—	—		Soulful
"I'll Never Fall in Love Again"	1969	6	17	1	—	3	1	—	—	—		I'll Never Fall in Love Again
"—" denotes a recording that did not chart or was not released in that territory.

=== 1970s ===
List of singles, with selected chart positions and certifications, showing other relevant details
Title	Year	Peak chart positions									Certifications	Album
Title	Year	US	US R&B	US AC	AUS	CAN	CAN AC	NL	NZ	UK	Certifications	Album
"Let Me Go to Him"	1970	32	45	5	47	30	—	—	—	—		I'll Never Fall in Love Again
"Paper Mache"	1970	43	—	6	51	34	—	—	—	—		I'll Never Fall in Love Again
"Make It Easy on Yourself"	1970	37	26	2	—	24	—	—	—	—		Very Dionne
"The Green Grass Starts to Grow"	1970	43	—	2	—	35	—	—	—	—		Very Dionne
"Who Gets the Guy"	1971	57	41	6	—	—	—	—	—	—		Non-album single
"Amanda" / "He's Moving On"	1971	83	—	15	—	—	—	—	—	—		The Love Machine Soundtrack
"If We Only Have Love"	1972	84	—	37	—	—	—	—	—	—		Dionne
"I Think You Need Love"	1973	—	—	—	—	—	—	—	—	—		Just Being Myself
"(I'm Just) Being Myself"	1973	—	62	—	—	—	—	—	—	—		Just Being Myself
"Then Came You" (with The Spinners)	1974	1	2	3	59	7	6	28	—	29	RIAA: Gold	Then Came You
"Sure Thing"	1974	—	66	—	—	—	29	—	—	—		Then Came You
"Take It from Me"	1975	—	30	—	—	—	—	—	—	—		Then Came You
"Once You Hit the Road"	1975	79	5	22	—	—	—	—	—	—		Track of the Cat
"His House and Me"	1976	—	75	—	—	—	—	—	—	—		Track of the Cat
"I Didn't Mean to Love You"	1976	—	91	—	—	—	—	—	—	—		Non-album single
"I Say a Little Prayer"/"By the Time I Get to Phoenix" (with Isaac Hayes)	1977	—	65	—	—	—	—	—	—	—		A Man and a Woman
"Do You Believe in Love at First Sight"	1977	—	—	—	—	—	—	—	—	—		Love at First Sight
"Keepin' My Head Above Water"	1977	—	—	—	—	—	—	—	—	—		Love at First Sight
"Don't Ever Take Your Love Away"	1978	—	—	—	—	—	—	—	—	—		Love at First Sight
"I'll Never Love This Way Again"	1979	5	18	5	36	6	16	27	24	62	RIAA: Gold	Dionne
"Déjà Vu"	1979	15	25	1	69	34	7	—	45	—		Dionne
"—" denotes a recording that did not chart or was not released in that territory.

=== 1980s ===
List of singles, with selected chart positions and certifications, showing other relevant details
Title	Year	Peak chart positions										Certifications	Album
Title	Year	US	US R&B	US AC	AUS	CAN	CAN AC	GER	NL	NZ	UK	Certifications	Album
"After You"	1980	65	33	10	—	85	—	—	—	—	—		Dionne
"No Night So Long"	1980	23	19	1	—	—	3	—	—	—	—		No Night So Long
"Easy Love"	1980	62	—	12	—	—	—	—	—	—	—		No Night So Long
"Some Changes Are for Good"	1981	65	43	23	—	—	—	—	—	—	—		Hot, Live, and Otherwise
"Now We're Starting Over Again"	1981	—	—	—	—	—	—	—	—	—	76		Hot, Live, and Otherwise
"There's a Long Road Ahead of Us"	1981	—	—	—	—	—	—	—	—	—	—		Hot, Live, and Otherwise
"Friends in Love" (with Johnny Mathis)	1982	38	22	5	46	—	13	—	—	—	—		Friends in Love
"For You"	1982	—	—	14	—	—	—	—	—	—	—		Friends in Love
"Heartbreaker"	1982	10	14	1	2	15	—	10	5	4	2	BPI: Silver	Heartbreaker
"Take the Short Way Home"	1983	41	43	5	—	—	1	—	—	—	—		Heartbreaker
"All the Love in the World"	1983	— (Note: "All the Love in the World" did not enter the Hot 100, but peaked at number 101 on the Bubbling Under Hot 100 Singles chart.)	—	16	53	—	—	50	11	23	10	BPI: Silver	Heartbreaker
"Yours"	1983	—	—	—	—	—	—	—	—	—	66		Heartbreaker
"How Many Times Can We Say Goodbye" (with Luther Vandross)	1983	27	7	4	—	—	4	—	—	—	99		How Many Times Can We Say Goodbye
"Got a Date"	1984	—	45	—	—	—	—	—	—	—	—		How Many Times Can We Say Goodbye
"Finder of Lost Loves" (with Glenn Jones)	1985	—	47	12	—	—	15	—	—	—	—		Finder of Lost Loves
"Run to Me" (with Barry Manilow)	1985	—	—	12	—	—	20	—	—	—	86		Finder of Lost Loves
"That's What Friends Are For" (with Elton John, Gladys Knight and Stevie Wonder)	1985	1	1	1	1	1	—	—	13	3	16	RIAA: Gold; BPI: Silver; MC: Platinum; RMNZ: Gold	Friends
"Whisper in the Dark"	1986	72	49	7	—	64	9	—	—	—	—		Friends
"Love Power" (with Jeffrey Osborne)	1987	12	5	1	—	21	5	—	—	—	63		Reservations for Two
"Reservations for Two" (with Kashif)	1987	62	20	7	—	—	—	—	—	—	—		Reservations for Two
"Another Chance to Love" (with Howard Hewett)	1988	—	42	24	—	—	—	—	—	—	—		Reservations for Two
"Take Good Care of You and Me" (with Jeffrey Osborne)	1989	—	46	25	—	—	—	—	—	—	93		Greatest Hits: 1979–1990
"—" denotes a recording that did not chart or was not released in that territory.

=== 1990s–2020s ===
List of singles, with selected chart positions, showing other relevant details
Title	Year	Peak chart positions			Album
Title	Year	US	US R&B	US Dan	Album
"I Don't Need Another Love" (with The Spinners)	1990	—	84	—	Greatest Hits: 1979–1990
"Sunny Weather Lover"	1993	—	—	—	Friends Can Be Lovers
"Where My Lips Have Been"	1993	—	95	—	Friends Can Be Lovers
"Friends Can Be Lovers"	1993	—	—	—	Friends Can Be Lovers
"Captives of the Heart"	1994	—	—	—	Aquarela do Brasil
"What the World Needs Now Is Love" (with HipHopNationUnited)	1998	87	—	—	Dionne Sings Dionne
"High Upon This Love"	1998	—	—	—	Dionne Sings Dionne
"I Promise You"	1998	—	—	—	Dionne Sings Dionne
"Do You Know the Way to San Jose" (with Celia Cruz)	2005	—	—	—	My Friends and Me
"Is There Anybody Out There"	2012	—	—	—	Now
"A House Is Not a Home" (with Ne-Yo)	2014	—	—	—	Feels So Good
"Hope Is Just Ahead" (with Billy Ray Cyrus)	2014	—	—	—	Feels So Good
"You Really Started Something"	2019	—	—	16	She's Back
"Peace Like a River" (with Dolly Parton)	2023	—	—	—	TBA
"—" denotes a recording that did not chart or was not released in that territory.

=== Other singles ===
List of singles, with selected chart positions, showing other relevant details
Title	Year	Peak chart positions								Notes
Title	Year	US	US R&B	US AC	AUS	CAN	CAN AC	GER	UK	Notes
"A House Is Not a Home"	1964	71	—	—	—	37	—	—	—	Released as the B-side of the single "You'll Never Get to Heaven (If You Break My Heart)". The song would later appear on the studio album Make Way for Dionne Warwick (1964).
"Alfie"	1967	15	5	—	—	10	—	—	—	Released as the B-side of the 1967 single "The Beginning of Loneliness". The song would later appear on Warwick's studio album Here Where There Is Love (1967).
"(Theme from) Valley of the Dolls"	1967	2	13	2	59	4	11	—	28	Released as the B-side of "I Say a Little Prayer". The song would later appear on the studio album Dionne Warwick in Valley of the Dolls.
"Let Me Be Lonely"	1968	71	—	—	—	66	—	—	—	Released as the B-side of "Do You Know the Way to San Jose". The single was released on Scepter Records and did not originally appear on an album.
"(There's) Always Something There to Remind Me"	1968	65	—	—	—	—	—	—	—	Released as the B-side of the single "Who is Gonna Love Me" in 1968. Issued on Scepter Records, the song also appeared on Warwick's 1967 studio album The Windows of the World.
"The Love of My Man"	1971	— (Note: "The Love of My Man" did not enter the Hot 100, but peaked at number 107 on the Bubbling Under Hot 100 Singles chart.)	—	—	—	—	—	—	—	Released as a single following the departure of Warwick from Scepter Records. Although it did not officially appear on an album originally, it was included on the compilation From Within. The original title of the record included Warwick's name printed as "Dionne Warwicke".
"I'm Your Puppet"	1972	— (Note: "I'm Your Puppet" did not enter the Hot 100, but peaked at number 113 on the Bubbling Under Hot 100 Singles chart.)	—	—	—	—	—	—	—	Released as a single following the departure of Warwick from Scepter Records. Although it did not officially appear on an album originally, it was included on the compilation From Within. The original title of the record included Warwick's name printed as "Dionne Warwicke".
"Raindrops Keep Fallin' on My Head"	1972	—	—	—	—	—	—	—	—	Released as a single following the departure of Warwick from Scepter Records. Although it did not officially appear on an album originally, it was included on the compilation A Decade of Gold.
"The Good Life"	1973	—	—	—	—	—	—	—	—	Released as a single following the departure of Warwick from Scepter Records.The song first appeared on Warwick's 1966 album titled Dionne Warwick in Paris. The original title of the record included Warwick's name printed as "Dionne Warwicke".
"Only Love Can Break a Heart"	1977	— (Note: "Only Love Can Break a Heart" did not enter the Hot 100, but peaked at number 109 on the Bubbling Under Hot 100 Singles chart.)	—	46	—	—	—	—	—	Released as a single in 1977 on the Musicor LP of the same name. Recorded during her tenure at Scepter.
"We Never Said Goodbye"	1980	—	41	—	—	—	—	—	—	Released as the B-side of the single "Easy Love" in 1980.
"It's All Over" (with Blue System)	1991	—	—	—	—	—	—	60	—	Released as a single with German musical group Blue System. The single was released via Ariola Records and appeared on the group's album Déjà Vu.
"—" denotes a recording that did not chart or was not released in that territory.

== Other appearances ==
Year	Song	Album
1984	"It's You" (duet with Stevie Wonder)	The Woman in Red
1984	"Moments Aren't Moments"	The Woman in Red
1984	"Weakness" (duet with Stevie Wonder)	The Woman in Red
1985	"We Are the World" (USA for Africa)	We Are the World
1986	"What on Earth"	Dave Clark's "Time": The Album
1986	"Within My World"	Dave Clark's "Time": The Album
1987	"In Love Alone"	Time
1988	"Two Strong Hearts" (duet with Johnny Mathis)	Once in a While
1989	"Till I Loved You" (duet with Plácido Domingo)	Goya: A Life in Song
1989	"Once A Time (I Loved You)"	Goya: A Life in Song
1989	"You and I" (duet with Paul Anka)	Somebody Loves You
1991	"Who's Counting Heartaches" (duet with Johnny Mathis)	Better Together: The Duet Album
1991	"Superwoman" (with Gladys Knight and Patti LaBelle)	Good Woman
1992	"Mr. Kiss Kiss Bang Bang" (recorded in 1965)	The Best of James Bond
1992	"Quase um Sonho (Almost a Dream)" (duet with José Augusto)	José Augusto
1994	"I'll Never Love This Way Again" (live version)	Grammy's Greatest Moments Volume IV
1997	"Hummingbird" (duet with B.B. King)	Deuces Wild
