= The Windows of the World =

Studio album by Dionne Warwick
- Released: August 31, 1967
- Recorded: 1966–1967
- Genre: Pop, R&B
- Length: 31:25
- Label: Scepter
- Producer: Burt Bacharach, Hal David

Dionne Warwick chronology
On Stage and in the Movies (1967)	The Windows of the World (1967)	Dionne Warwick's Golden Hits, Part One (1967)

Singles from The Windows of the World
- 1. "The Windows of the World" Released: July 1967; 2. "I Say a Little Prayer" Released: October 1967

Professional ratings
Review scores
Source	Rating
Allmusic	4.5/5 stars

The Windows of the World is the title of the eighth studio album by Dionne Warwick, released on August 31, 1967 by Scepter Records. The LP features the title cut which was in the Top 40.

== History ==
The single "The Windows of the World" had been recorded 13 April 1967 in the same session which produced Warwick's recording of "(There's) Always Something There to Remind Me"^{1} also included on The Windows of the World album. The album featured four other recordings of Burt Bacharach/Hal David compositions, these four tracks all originating in a 9 April 1966 session and thus predating Warwick's December 1966 album release Here Where There is Love and being omitted from it; two of these four tracks had appeared on the Billboard Hot 100 the first being the December 1966 single release "Another Night" (#49) and the second "The Beginning of Loneliness" (#79) released March 1967 as the original A-side of "Alfie".

The other two album tracks from the 9 April 1966 session were the B-side of the single "The Windows of the World" entitled "Walk Little Dolly" and a track released for the first time on the album The Windows of the World entitled "I Say a Little Prayer". Bacharach had an especial dislike for the last-named track having been unable to obtain the desired results instead finding the arrangement rushed despite doing ten takes—typically the tracks Bacharach recorded with Warwick required at most three takes often requiring only one—and it was Scepter Records owner Florence Greenberg rather than Bacharach who got "I Say a Little Prayer" released on the album The Windows of the World.

Apart from "Love"—Warwick's recording of this 1965 Bert Kaempfert/Milt Gabler composition is of uncertain origination date—the outside material on The Windows of the World comprises three tracks cut for Warwick's preceding On Stage and in the Movies album which were omitted from the last-named album's finalized track listing: "What's Good About Goodbye", a Leo Robin/Harold Arlen composition introduced in the 1948 film Casbah; "Somewhere" composed by Stephen Sondheim and Leonard Bernstein for the stage musical West Side Story; and "You're Gonna Hear From Me" (writers: Dory Previn/André Previn) a song introduced in the film Inside Daisy Clover (1965).

The back cover of the original album listed the song "Taking a Chance on Love" (writers: Vernon Duke/John La Touche and Ted Fetter), introduced in the all-black 1940 Broadway musical Cabin In The Sky, which was not actually cut on the LP. The recording was located in 2003 and included on the Rhino CD rerelease of The Windows of the World (coupled with Valley of the Dolls).

Originally there was no plan to release a second A-side single from The Windows of the World album, the intended follow-up to "The Windows of the World" single being the theme from the movie Valley of the Dolls with the Windows of the World album track "I Say a Little Prayer" relegated to B-side. Disc jockeys however favored "I Say a Little Prayer"^{2} with that track's breezy arrangement—denigrated by Bacharach as "rushed"—proving to be the sound to effect a return for Warwick to the Top Ten for the first time since the spring of 1966 (when "Message to Michael" had been a hit); "I Say a Little Prayer" peaked at #4 in December 1967 with its parent album concurrently peaking at #22.

- ^{1}Warwick's rendition of "(There's) Always Something There to Remind Me" would have a single release in August 1968 as the B-side of "Who Is Gonna Love Me?"; the first-named track would also chart in its own right reaching #65.
- ^{2}The "(Theme from) Valley of the Dolls" side of the single did become a chart hit in 1968 reaching #2.

== Track listing ==
All tracks are written by Burt Bacharach and Hal David, except where noted.

Side one
No.	Title	Length
1.	"I Say a Little Prayer"	3:04
2.	"Walk Little Dolly"	3:27
3.	"The Beginning of Loneliness"	3:30
4.	"Another Night"	2:34
5.	"The Windows of the World"	3:23

Side two
No.	Title	Writer(s)	Length
6.	"(There's) Always Something There to Remind Me"		2:59
7.	"Somewhere"	Stephen Sondheim, Leonard Bernstein	4:23
8.	"You're Gonna Hear from Me"	Dory Previn, André Previn	4:29
9.	"Love"	Bert Kaempfert, Milt Gabler	2:52
10.	"What's Good About Goodbye"	Leo Robin, Harold Arlen	2:41

== Personnel ==
- Dionne Warwick – vocals
- Burt Bacharach, Peter Matz, Owen B. Masingill – arrangements
- Burt Goldblatt – art direction, design
- Stan Papich – photography

== Charts ==
=== Weekly charts ===
Weekly chart performance for The Windows of the World
Chart (1967)	Peak position
US Top LP's (Billboard)	22
US Top Selling R&B LP's (Billboard)	11
US Top 100 Albums (Cash Box)	17
US Top 100 LP's (Record World)	16

=== Year-end charts ===
Year-end chart performance for The Windows of the World
Chart (1967)	Position
US Top Selling R&B LP's (Billboard)	50
US Top 100 Albums (Cash Box)	81
