= She's Back (Dionne Warwick album) =

Studio album by Dionne Warwick
- Released: May 17, 2019
- Length: 125:28
- Label: Kind; eOne
- Producer: Damon Elliott; Teddy Harmon; Brian McKnight; Rob Shrock; Musiq Soulchild

Dionne Warwick chronology
Feels So Good (2014)	She's Back (2019)	Dionne Warwick & the Voices of Christmas (2019)

She's Back is a studio album by American singer Dionne Warwick. It was released by Kind Music and eOne Entertainment on May 17, 2019. Chiefly produced by her son Damon Elliott along with Teddy Harmon, initial editions of She's Back contained a remastered version of Warwick's 1998 album Dionne Sings Dionne as a bonus disc. It debuted and peaked at number 19 on the US Independent Albums.

== Critical reception ==
Professional ratings
Review scores
Source	Rating
Allmusic	2.5/5 stars

Stephen Thomas Erlewine from Allmusic wrote that Warwick's son and chief producer Damon Elliott "paints She's Back with all manners of modern flair: the rhythms are electronic, the instruments largely synthesized, and the bass is often cranked. Several vocalists are invited to help broaden Warwick's appeal, too. Her duet partners are relatively old-fashioned (Kenny Lattimore, Brian McKnight), relatively hip (Musiq Soulchild), and certainly surprising (Krayzie Bone, whose verse on "Déjà Vu" is disarming), and they all help nudge She's Back into the 21st century, even if the overall aesthetic remains lodged in the 20th century [...] Since the album relies so heavily on ballads and slow jams, it becomes apparent that Warwick's voice isn't as supple as it once was, a transition that is inevitable with age, but the songs and settings of She's Back cast this human deficit in an unfortunately harsh light."

== Track listing ==
Disc one: She's Back — Standard edition
No.	Title	Writer(s)	Producer(s)	Length
1.	"Am I Dreaming" (featuring Musiq Soulchild)	Sam Dees	Damon Elliott; Musiq Soulchild; Teddy Harmon	5:06
2.	"Tears Ago"	Rahsaan Patterson	Elliott; Harmon	4:55
3.	"What Color Is Love" (featuring Kenny Lattimore)	Terry Callier	Elliott; Harmon	4:06
4.	"How Do You Keep the Music Playing" (featuring Kevon Edmonds)	Alan Bergman; Marilyn Bergman; Michel Legrand	Elliott; Harmon	4:18
5.	"Déjà Vu" (featuring Krayzie Bone)	Adrienne Anderson; Isaac Hayes	Elliott; Harmon	6:09
6.	"Forever in My Heart" (featuring Brian McKnight)	McKnight	Elliott; McKnight	3:42
7.	"Dream with No Love"	Anthony Gibson; Gerald Levert	Elliott; Harmon	4:10
8.	"We're in Love"	Patti Austin	Elliott; Harmon	3:26
9.	"You Really Started Something"	Denise Rich; Luther Vandross	Elliott; Harmon	3:19
10.	"Two Ships" (featuring Fiji)	Dionne Warwick	Rob Shrock; Elliott^{[A]}; Fiji^{[A]}	4:55
11.	"Life Is Waiting"	Brenda Russell	Russell; Elliott^{[A]}	4:01
12.	"If I Want To"	Burt Bacharach; Hal David	Elliott; Shrock	4:34
13.	"We Need to Go Back" (featuring Jubilation Choir)	Ashford & Simpson	Elliott	3:17
14.	"What a Fool Believes"	Kenneth Loggins; Michael McDonald	Shrock; Elliott^{[A]}	4:02
15.	"What the World Needs Now" (2019 version; featuring Jubilation Choir)	Bacharach; David	Elliott	4:49

Disc two: Dionne Sings Dionne
No.	Title	Writer(s)	Producer(s)	Length
1.	"Walk On By"	Bacharach; David	Steve Tyrell	3:44
2.	"Love Begins with You"	Zane Giles; Larry Weiss	Giles; Kevin Dorsey	4:08
3.	"Reach Out for Me"	Bacharach; David	Elliott; Harmon	4:14
4.	"High Upon This Love"	Andrew Weitz; Bradley Bell; David Elliott; David Kurtz; Jack Allocco	Giles	4:22
5.	"I Say a Little Prayer"	Bacharach; David	Elliott; Harmon	4:24
6.	"(There's) Always Something There to Remind Me"	Bacharach; David	Elliott	4:46
7.	"If I Want To"	Bacharach; David	George Duke	4:30
8.	"Aquarela do Brasil"	Ary Barroso; Bob Russell	Elliott	3:53
9.	"I Promise You"	Fred Busby; Wayne Holmes	Duke	5:08
10.	"Be My Neighbour"	Damon Elliott; Ted Harmon; Tyrese Gibson	Elliott	3:14
11.	"All Kinds of People"	Bacharach; David	Shrock	3:37
12.	"What the World Needs Now Is Love"	Bacharach; David	Elliott	4:19
13.	"Do You Know the Way to San Jose"	Bacharach; David	Giles; Elliott	3:35
14.	"Humbly I Pray"	Tim Miner	Miner	4:45

Notes

- ^{^[A]} denotes vocals producer

== Charts ==
Chart (2019)	Peak position
US Independent Albums (Billboard)	19
US Top Album Sales (Billboard)	75

== Release history ==
Region	Date	Format	Label	Ref.
Various	May 17, 2019	CD; digital download; streaming	Kind; eOne	
