= The Love Collection =

The Love Collection may refer to:

- The Love Collection (Dionne Warwick album)
- The Love Collection (Anna Vissi album)
- The Love Collection (Jinny Ng album)
- Love Collection, a 2000 Mina album
