= I'll Never Fall in Love Again (disambiguation) =

"I'll Never Fall in Love Again" is a 1968 Burt Bacharach song.

I'll Never Fall in Love Again may also refer to:

- "I'll Never Fall in Love Again" (Lonnie Donegan song) (1962), popularized by Tom Jones
- "I'll Never Fall in Love Again", a song from 1950s, written and performed by Johnnie Ray
- "I'll Never Fall in Love Again", a song from Dance to the Music_(Sly and the Family Stone album) (1968)
- I'll Never Fall in Love Again, a 1970 album by Bobbie Gentry
- I'll Never Fall in Love Again (album), a 1970 album by Dionne Warwick
- "Oh No (I'll Never Fall in Love Again)", a song recorded by Selena in 1995 and released in 2015, originally intended for the album Dreaming of You
