= On Stage and in the Movies =

Studio album by Dionne Warwick
- Released: May 1967
- Recorded: 1967
- Studio: Scepter Recording Studios, New York City; A&R Recording Studios, New York City
- Genre: Pop, R&B
- Label: Scepter
- Producer: Burt Bacharach, Hal David

Dionne Warwick chronology
Here Where There Is Love (1966)	On Stage and in the Movies (1967)	The Windows of the World (1967)

Professional ratings
Review scores
Source	Rating
Allmusic	3/5 stars

On Stage and in the Movies is Dionne Warwick's seventh album for Scepter Records, and was recorded and released in May 1967. The LP was issued as number 559 in the Scepter Catalog.

== History ==
The cover art for this LP was simple: Warwick in a multicolored gown against a black background. As mentioned in the liner notes of the Rhino Records 1984 collection Dionne Warwick Anthology, this LP was one of three concept albums recorded by Warwick during her tenure with Scepter. The other two albums identified in the notes are Soulful and The Magic of Believing.

While there were no hit singles from this album, some of the songs that were featured were "Summertime"; a humorous reading of "Anything You Can Do" (alongside an uncredited Chuck Jackson); "You'll Never Walk Alone"; "Something Wonderful", and "Baubles, Bangles, and Beads".

The album, like most of Warwick's Scepter work, was arranged by Burt Bacharach and produced by Bacharach and Hal David; however, none of the material on the album was written by the songwriting duo.

== Track listing ==
Side one
No.	Title	Writer(s)	Length
1.	"Summertime"	George Gershwin, Ira Gershwin, DuBose Heyward	2:58
2.	"You'll Never Walk Alone"	Richard Rodgers, Oscar Hammerstein II	4:07
3.	"My Favorite Things"	Rodgers, Hammerstein II	2:55
4.	"Something Wonderful"	Rodgers, Hammerstein II	2:27
5.	"One Hand, One Heart" / "With These Hands" (Medley)	Stephen Sondheim, Leonard Bernstein / Abner Silver, Benny Davis	3:59

Side two
No.	Title	Writer(s)	Length
6.	"The Way You Look Tonight"	Dorothy Fields, Jerome Kern	2:29
7.	"He (She) Loves Me"	Jerry Bock, Sheldon Harnick	2:21
8.	"I Believe in You"	Frank Loesser	2:25
9.	"Baubles, Bangles, & Beads"	Robert Wright, George Forrest	2:47
10.	"Anything You Can Do" (with Chuck Jackson)	Irving Berlin	2:18
11.	"My Ship"	Ira Gershwin, Kurt Weill	3:17

== Personnel ==
- Dionne Warwick - vocals
- Garry Sherman, Ray Ellis, Burt Bacharach - arrangements
- John Lakata, Phil Ramone - audio engineer
- Burt Goldblatt - art direction, cover design

== Charts ==
Chart performance for On Stage and in the Movies
Chart (1967)	Peak position
US Top LP's (Billboard)	169
US Top Selling R&B LP's (Billboard)	11
US Top 100 Albums (Cash Box)	69
US Top 100 LP's (Record World)	74
