= Workshy =

English band formed in 1986

- Origin: London, England
- Genres: Pop
- Years active: 1986–present
- Labels: Magnet, WEA
- Members: Chrysta Marina Jones; Michael John McDermott
- Past members: Kevin Damien Kehoe

Workshy is an English band formed in London in 1986 by Michael McDermott, Chrysta Jones and Kevin Kehoe (who left in 1992). They are perhaps best known for their songs “Never The Same” and “You’re The Summer” as well as covers of the Bacharach/David song “I Say A Little Prayer”, “If I Ever Lose This Heaven” and Carole King’s "It's Too Late".

The band was signed by UK-based Magnet Records in June 1987 and released their debut album The Golden Mile in 1989.They became acquainted with a Japanese promoter, Toshi Yajima, and began a long spell of success in Japan and other countries in south-east Asia, signing to three Japanese labels and touring in the region on numerous occasions, notably the Blue Note and Billboard clubs in Tokyo. Michaels had a bad accident in 2010 and activities stopped for a while but he recovered and they returned to making albums and touring.

All of Workshy's back catalogue was released for download in 2011. They released a new single for download in 2012, "In This Neighbourhood" (unplugged) - a reworking of one of their earlier tracks. Their most recent album was ‘Love Soul’ released in Japan in 2020.

== Discography ==
- The Golden Mile (1989)
- Ocean (1992)
- Heaven (1993)
- Soul Love (1994)
- Under the Influence (1995)
- Allure (1998)
- Free'n Easy (1998)
- Clear (2000)
- Mood (2002)
- Smile Again (2007)
- Bittersweet (2011)
- Wayward (Manana, 2017)
- Love Soul (Manana, 2020)
