= Dionne Warwick's Golden Hits, Part One =

Compilation album by Dionne Warwick
- Released: 1967
- Recorded: 1962–1964
- Genre: Pop; soul
- Length: 33:30
- Label: Scepter
- Producer: Burt Bacharach; Hal David

Dionne Warwick chronology
| The Windows of the World (1967) | Dionne Warwick's Golden Hits, Part One (1967) | Dionne Warwick in Valley of the Dolls (1968) |

Dionne Warwick's Golden Hits, Part One is a compilation album by American singer Dionne Warwick, released in 1967 by Scepter Records. The album contains twelve major hits of the singer, recorded from 1962 to 1964. All songs were written and produced by Burt Bacharach and Hal David.

== Critical reception ==
Professional ratings
Review scores
| Source | Rating |
|---|---|
| AllMusic | 3/5 stars |
| The Encyclopedia of Popular Music | 4/5 stars |
| The Rolling Stone Album Guide | 3.5/5 stars |

The Cash Box reviewer wrote that this album is presenting Dionne Warwick at her best, in shimmering gold from front to back.

Ron Wynn from AllMusic noted that this album and its follow-up were the best collections of classic Dionne Warwick, he also added that "LP with such gems as 'Anyone Who Had a Heart,' 'Walk on By,' and 'Don't Make Me Over' couldn't be anything but great."

== Track listing ==
All tracks are written by Burt Bacharach and Hal David.

Side A
| No. | Title | Length |
|---|---|---|
| 1. | "Don't Make Me Over" | 2:51 |
| 2. | "Anyone Who Had A Heart" | 2:58 |
| 3. | "Make It Easy on Yourself" | 2:40 |
| 4. | "I Smiled Yesterday" | 2:43 |
| 5. | "Wishin' and Hopin'" | 2:55 |
| 6. | "Walk On By" | 2:58 |
| Total length: | | 17:05 |

Side B
| No. | Title | Length |
|---|---|---|
| 1. | "Reach Out for Me" | 2:52 |
| 2. | "You'll Never Get to Heaven (If You Break My Heart)" | 2:58 |
| 3. | "This Empty Place" | 2:55 |
| 4. | "It's Love That Really Counts" | 2:16 |
| 5. | "(There's) Always Something There to Remind Me" | 2:59 |
| 6. | "Any Old Time of Day" | 2:25 |
| Total length: | | 16:25 |

== Charts ==
=== Weekly charts ===
Weekly chart performance for Dionne Warwick's Golden Hits, Part One
| Chart (1967–1968) | Peak position |
|---|---|
| US Top LP's (Billboard) | 10 |
| US Best Selling R&B LP's (Billboard) | 3 |
| US Top 100 Albums (Cash Box) | 13 |
| US Top 100 LP's (Record World) | 10 |

=== Year-end charts ===
Year-end chart performance for Dionne Warwick's Golden Hits, Part One
| Chart (1968) | Position |
|---|---|
| US Top 100 Albums (Cash Box) | 50 |
