= 1969 (film) =

1988 drama film directed by Ernest Thompson

- Theatrical release poster
- Directed by: Ernest Thompson
- Written by: Ernest Thompson
- Produced by: Bill Badalato; Daniel Grodnik
- Starring: Robert Downey Jr.; Kiefer Sutherland; Bruce Dern; Mariette Hartley; Winona Ryder; Joanna Cassidy
- Cinematography: Jules Brenner
- Edited by: William M. Anderson
- Music by: Michael Small
- Distributed by: Atlantic Releasing
- Release date: November 18, 1988
- Running time: 95 minutes
- Country: United States
- Language: English
- Budget: $7 million
- Box office: $5,979,011

1969 is a 1988 American drama film written and directed by Ernest Thompson and starring Robert Downey Jr., Kiefer Sutherland and Winona Ryder. The original music score is composed by Michael Small. The film deals with the Vietnam War and the resulting social tensions between those who support and oppose the war in small-town America.

== Plot ==
Two boys, Ralph and Scott, hitchhike home from college, arriving on Easter morning and shout their greetings across the glen to their families during a lakeside Easter Sunrise service, much to the amusement of Ralph's younger sister, Beth, and mother, Ev, and embarrassment of Scott's mother, Jessie, and father, Cliff. Later that day, they drive Scott's older brother, Alden, who is shipping off to Vietnam, to the bus depot; Alden and Scott fight when Scott accuses the Marine of being afraid to go to Vietnam. Their father arrives, wondering what is going on.

A few weeks later, Scott and Ralph again return home from college to attend Beth's high school graduation, where they learn that Ralph has flunked out of college (thus making him eligible to be drafted). The boys decide to spend the summer on the road, living out of their van, experiencing all the freedom that the counterculture has to offer. Eventually, they arrive back at their hometown in the middle of its summer festival, where they learn that Alden has disappeared and is considered MIA. Ralph and Scott hatch a plan to steal their files from the local draft board office, but they are caught, and Ralph is arrested.

Scott is now determined to avoid Ralph's fate, planning to head to Canada to avoid the draft. Scott invites Beth to travel with him on his trip, and to stay away until the end of the war. Admitting their attraction to each other, they make love in the van. Later, they decide to visit Ralph in jail to tell him they are leaving. Ralph reveals in a very sarcastic tone that he actually wants to go to Vietnam. When he learns that his friend and his sister have had sexual relations, he disowns Scott and ignores Beth.

Scott and Beth get to the Canada–US border and are about to cross but have a change of heart and head back to Maryland. When they get home, they learn of Alden's death in the line of duty. Scott leads a huge march downtown in the midst of the funeral, where Ralph is released from jail and the friends are reunited. The film ends with a narration by Scott, announcing that his family and friends later join hundreds of thousands of other Americans towards Washington, D.C. to protest the Vietnam War.

== Cast ==
- Robert Downey Jr. as Ralph Carr
- Kiefer Sutherland as Scott Denny
- Bruce Dern as Cliff Denny
- Mariette Hartley as Jessie Denny
- Winona Ryder as Beth Carr
- Joanna Cassidy as Ev Carr

== Critical reception ==
On Rotten Tomatoes, the film has an approval rating of 55% based on reviews from 11 critics.

Rita Kempley of The Washington Post wrote, "[The film] 1969, the directorial debut of Ernest Thompson, is an aimless drama, its purpose and promise lost in a thicket of false endings and a fog of nostalgia". Janet Maslin of The New York Times described how "Mr. Dern, unusually laconic here, is unexpectedly moving as the character who seems most confused by changing times. Variety said, "Affecting memories and good intentions don't always add up to good screen stories, and such is the case in 1969, one of the murkiest reflections on the Vietnam War era yet, notwithstanding good performances all around and bright packaging of Kiefer Sutherland and Robert Downey Jr. in the leads."

== Box office ==
The film was a disappointment at the box office, grossing only $5,979,011 against a $7 million budget.

== Soundtrack ==
The film's soundtrack consists of original period rock. However, it also includes a notable re-recording of The Youngbloods' classic hit "Get Together", performed as a solo by the Youngbloods' lead singer Jesse Colin Young, as well as a new cover, by The Pretenders, of the 1967 Burt Bacharach/Hal David song "The Windows of the World."
