= Dionne Warwick in Valley of the Dolls =

Studio album by Dionne Warwick
- Released: March 1968
- Recorded: 1967
- Studio: A & R (New York City); Bell Sound (New York City)
- Genre: Pop, R&B
- Label: Scepter
- Producer: Burt Bacharach, Hal David

Dionne Warwick chronology
| Dionne Warwick's Golden Hits, Part One (1967) | Dionne Warwick in Valley of the Dolls (1968) | The Magic of Believing (1968) |

Singles from Dionne Warwick in Valley of the Dolls
- 1. "(Theme from) Valley of the Dolls" Released: October 1967; 2. "Do You Know the Way to San Jose" Released: April 1968

Professional ratings
Review scores
| Source | Rating |
|---|---|
| Allmusic | 4/5 stars |

Dionne Warwick in Valley of the Dolls is the title of Dionne Warwick's ninth album for the Scepter label. It was recorded during the summer and fall of 1967 and was released early the next year in March 1968. It was recorded at A&R and Bell Sound Studios in New York City and was produced by Burt Bacharach and Hal David.

== History ==
The album's lead single was the title track, "(Theme from) Valley of the Dolls", from the film of the same name. The song was written by André Previn and Dory Previn, and had initially been intended for Judy Garland before she was fired from the film. At the urging of one of the film's stars, Barbara Parkins, the song was given to Warwick. Warwick's Scepter version of the song, however, differed from the John Williams version included in the film. This was because Warwick was signed to Scepter, and the soundtrack was released on 20th Century Records.

Warwick was only permitted to appear on the film's actual soundtrack and not the soundtrack album recording. The Dionne Warwick single peaked at #2 on the Billboard Hot 100 for four weeks in February 1968, at #2 on the Cash Box and #1 on the Record World charts during the spring of 1968. The LP was issued as number 568 in the Scepter Catalog. The cover art for this LP features Warwick on a black background, in an evening gown next to a director’s chair.

The LP would then yield Warwick's next big hit and first Grammy Award winner, "Do You Know the Way to San Jose". The song, (which Warwick didn't initially like, according to Robin Platts in the book, Burt Bacharach & Hal David) would peak at #10 on the Billboard Hot 100 and become one of Warwick's signature songs. "Do You Know the Way to San Jose" also became one of Warwick's biggest international hits, selling over 3,500,000 copies. Other notable songs on the LP were "Silent Voices" (which under its original Italian title, "La Voce Del Silenzio", had been Warwick's entry into the 1968 San Remo Song Festival), "Walking Backwards Down the Road", "Up, Up, and Away", and "You're My World" — another Italian song (written by Umberto Bindi) the latter having been a British #1 hit for Cilla Black, and "Let Me Be Lonely", the B side of the single "Do You Know the Way to San Jose", which charted on Billboard Hot 100 Singles Chart, becoming one of several double sided hits for Warwick during the 1960s. The album became an RIAA-certified gold record and peaked at #6 on the Billboard 200 album chart, #2 on the Billboard R&B Albums chart and #10 on the UK Albums Chart; the album would remain on the Billboard 200 for over a year and remains her highest-charting album on the chart. Rhino Records reissued the album on compact disc in 2004, combined with Windows of the World.

== Track listing ==
All tracks are written by Burt Bacharach and Hal David, except where noted.

Side one
| No. | Title | Writer(s) | Length |
|---|---|---|---|
| 1. | "As Long as There's an Apple Tree" | | 2:05 |
| 2. | "Up, Up and Away" | Jimmy Webb | 2:38 |
| 3. | "You're My World" | Carl Sigman, Umberto Bindi | 3:05 |
| 4. | "(Theme from) Valley of the Dolls" | André Previn, Dory Previn | 3:35 |
| 5. | "Silent Voices" | Norman Monath, Paolo Limiti, Mogol, Elio Isola | 3:07 |

Side two
| No. | Title | Writer(s) | Length |
|---|---|---|---|
| 6. | "Do You Know the Way to San Jose" | | 2:50 |
| 7. | "For the Rest of My Life" | Mann Curtis, Flavio Carraresi | 3:07 |
| 8. | "Let Me Be Lonely" | | 3:35 |
| 9. | "Where Would I Go" | | 2:40 |
| 10. | "Walking Backwards Down the Road" | | 2:54 |

== Personnel ==
- Manny Albam – arranger, conductor
- Burt Bacharach – arranger, conductor, producer
- Hal David – arranger, producer
- Peter Matz – arranger
- Phil Ramone – engineer
- Garry Sherman – arranger, conductor
- Ed Smith – engineer
- Dionne Warwick – vocals
- Pat Williams – arranger

== Charts ==
=== Weekly charts ===
Weekly chart performance for Dionne Warwick in Valley of the Dolls
| Chart (1968) | Peak position |
|---|---|
| UK Albums (OCC) | 10 |
| US Top LP's (Billboard) | 6 |
| US Best Selling R&B LP's (Billboard) | 2 |
| US Top 100 Albums (Cash Box) | 5 |
| US Top 100 LP's (Record World) | 3 |

=== Year-end charts ===
Year-end chart performance for Dionne Warwick in Valley of the Dolls
| Chart (1968) | Position |
|---|---|
| US Top 100 Albums (Cash Box) | 52 |

== Certifications and sales ==
Certifications for Dionne Warwick in Valley of the Dolls
| Region | Certification | Certified units/sales |
|---|---|---|
| United States (RIAA) | Gold | 500,000^{^} |
^{^} Shipments figures based on certification alone.
