= Message to Michael =

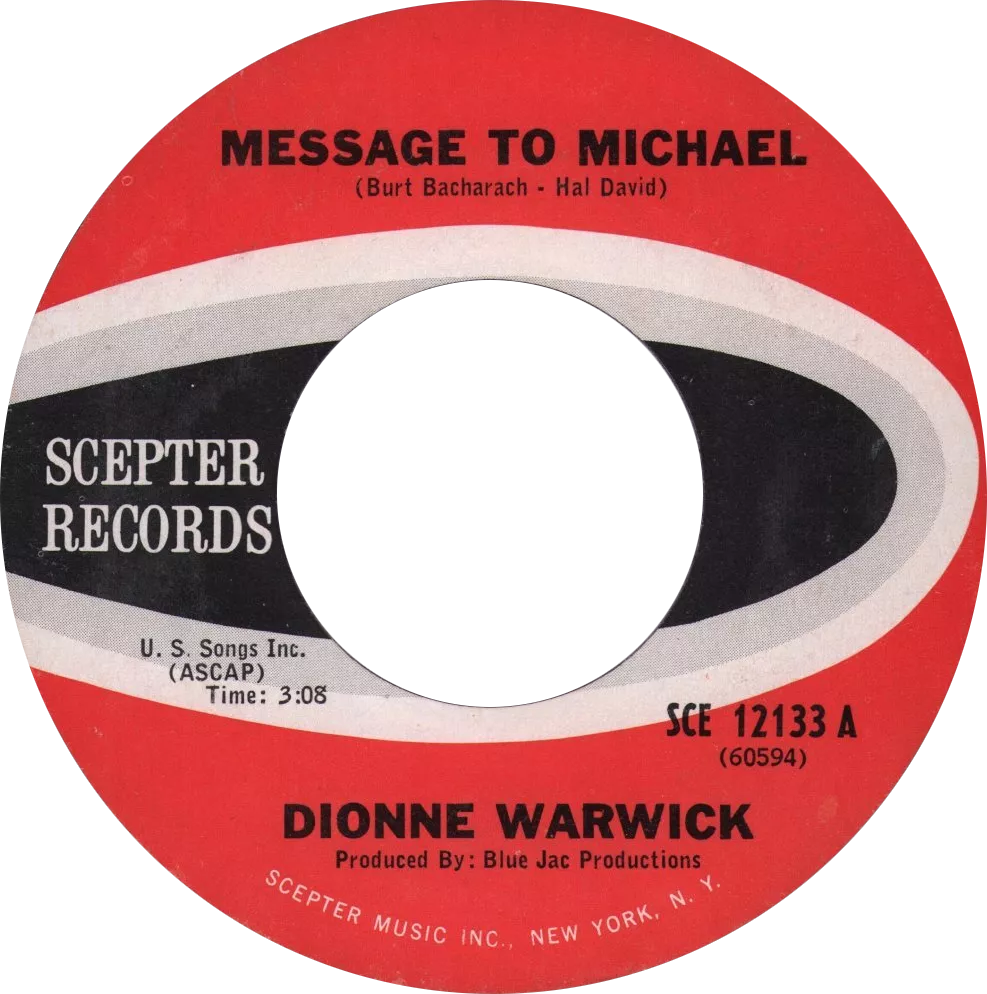
- One of side-A labels of the US single

Single by Dionne Warwick

from the album Dionne Warwick in Paris
- B-side: "Here Where There Is Love"
- Released: March 1966
- Recorded: 1966
- Studio: Paris, France
- Genre: Soul, pop, adult contemporary
- Length: 3:09
- Label: Scepter, Disques Vogue (France), Pye International (UK)
- Songwriters: Burt Bacharach, Hal David
- Producer: Blue Jac Productions

Dionne Warwick singles chronology
| "Are You There (With Another Girl)" (1965) | "Message to Michael" (1966) | "Trains and Boats and Planes" (1966) |

"Message to Michael" is a song written by Burt Bacharach and Hal David, that has been a hit for several different artists under several different titles. The song was first recorded as "Message to Martha" by Jerry Butler in 1962. In 1964, singer Lou Johnson had a minor US hit with the song, with the title "Kentucky Bluebird". British singer Adam Faith also recorded the song as "A Message to Martha (Kentucky Bluebird)" in 1965, and had a substantial hit with it in the UK, reaching No. 12. Exactly the same recording was issued in Australia as "Message to Martha", where it was a No. 15 hit for Faith. In the United States, Dionne Warwick's version, titled "Message to Michael", was a top ten hit there in 1966.

In all versions of the song, the lyrics are addressed to a bluebird by the singer. The singer is in Kentucky, and his/her sweetheart is vainly pursuing musical stardom in New Orleans. The singer asks the bluebird to take a message to Martha/Michael, asking for the sweetheart to return.

== Early versions ==
The song was first recorded as "Message to Martha" by Jerry Butler in the 1962 session in New York City which produced Butler's hit "Make It Easy on Yourself". However, Butler's "Message to Martha" was not released until December 1963 when it appeared as a track on Butler's Need to Belong album. Marlene Dietrich recorded a German version of the song in 1964, singing to the instrumental track of the Butler original (with augmentations); Dietrich's version was entitled Kleine Treue Nachtigall ('faithful little nightingale'), the German lyrics were written by Max Colpet. In 1964 Bacharach had Lou Johnson record the song as "Kentucky Bluebird": this version reached Billboard's "Bubbling Under the Hot 100" chart at #104 that fall. Johnson's single was also released in the UK where it was swiftly covered by Adam Faith as "A Message to Martha (Kentucky Bluebird)", which reached No. 12 UK in November 1964, becoming Faith's last Top 20 hit. Featured on the Adam Faith album released in the US in March 1965 in the wake of Faith's US Top 40 hit "It's Alright", "A Message to Martha (Kentucky Bluebird)" was performed by Faith on the Shindig! broadcast of 23 June 1965, but the track was not given a US single release. In Australia, Faith's recording was issued on a single with "It's Alright" in February 1965, and the single became a double-sided hit with a No. 15 peak.

== Dionne Warwick version ==
=== Background ===
Warwick's association with the song began when she recommended it as a concert number to Sacha Distel, with whom she was headlining at the Paris Olympia Theatre in 1966. Jacques Denjean prepped a backing track to which Distel was to sing the song in concert; when Distel decided against performing the song, Warwick considered using the instrumental track to record the song herself. Both Burt Bacharach and Hal David, when contacted by Warwick, were opposed to her singing what they maintained was a man's song. David also mentioned to Warwick that the only male name that could be subbed for "Martha" was "Michael", a name David disliked. Warwick took David's comment as a suggestion, recorded "Message to Michael" in a Paris recording studio, and added her vocals to the existing track. Warwick would say that the most difficult part of the recording session was getting the French background vocalists to pronounce 'Michael' correctly.

Scepter Records representative Steve Tyrell recalls "getting in an elevator with Burt and Hal and following them down into Times Square, begging them to let me put ["Message to Michael"] out. The next day they called Scepter Records owner Florence Greenberg and said 'Look, Steve is so into this tune – tell him he can put it on the B-side but he shouldn't promote it'". When "Message to Michael" was issued on a single backed with "Here Where There Is Love" Tyrell states "I got right on a plane [for] New Orleans and I went to WQNO|WTIX radio" and played "Message to Michael" for disc jockey Buzz Bennett who then "walked right into the control room and put it on the radio. Because it opened, 'Fly Away to New Orleans...' And in one week it was a smash!" In fact even prior to the single's release Warwick had performed "Message to Michael" on the NBC pop music TV program Hullabaloo in an episode broadcast 9 March 1966.

=== Impact ===
In May 1966 "Message to Michael" became Warwick's first Top 20 hit since "Reach Out for Me" 16 months previously; also in May 1966 "Message to Michael" became a Top Ten hit, Warwick's third after "Anyone Who Had a Heart" and "Walk on By". The Billboard Hot 100 peak of "Message to Michael" was #8 and Easy Listening #12; Billboard's R&B chart would afford "Message to Michael" a #5 peak, which remains Dionne Warwick's alltime best R&B chart showing for a solo recording: she'd previously hit #5 R&B with her first release "Don't Make Me Over" and after "Message to Michael" would reach #5 R&B as a soloist with both "Alfie" and "Once You Hit the Road".

As Burt Bacharach and Hal David were not involved in the recording of "Message to Michael" – the team being in fact opposed to Dionne Warwick recording their song – the producers' credit on the track reads "a Blue Jac Production", Blue Jac Productions being the name Bacharach/David and Warwick had incorporated under in 1962 (officially Blue Jac Productions, rather than Warwick personally, were signed to Scepter Records; the same production credit would be employed for Warwick's 1970 single "Make It Easy on Yourself", which was a recording from a live performance.)

In his 1968 book What the World Needs Now and Other Love Lyrics, Hal David admitted his misgivings over Warwick recording "Message to Michael" proved ill-founded, indeed stating "Dionne's vocal was so brilliant that it was obvious we had subconsciously written the song for her even while we thought we were writing it for a man."

== Chart history ==
=== Weekly charts ===
Lou Johnson ("Kentucky Bluebird")

| Chart (1964) | Peak position |
|---|---|
| UK Singles (OCC) | 36 |
| US Billboard Hot 100 | 104 |

Adam Faith ("Message to Martha")

| Chart (1964–1965) | Peak position |
|---|---|
| UK Singles (OCC) | 12 |
| Australia (ARIA) | 15 |

Dionne Warwick ("Message to Michael")

| Chart (1966) | Peak position |
|---|---|
| Australia (ARIA) | 44 |
| Canada Top Singles RPM | 6 |
| US Billboard Hot 100 | 8 |
| US Hot R&B/Hip-Hop Songs (Billboard) | 5 |
| US Easy Listening | 12 |
| US Cash Box Top 100 | 9 |

=== Year-end charts ===
| Chart (1966) | Rank |
|---|---|
| US Billboard Hot 100 | 77 |
| US Cash Box | 88 |

== Other versions ==
American recording artist Barbara McNair recorded the song as "Message to Michael" for her 1966 Motown debut album Here I Am.

American acoustic jazz guitarist, Earl Klugh features the song on his 1980 album Dream Come True.

Deacon Blue recorded a version of the song in 1990 for their Four Bacharach and David Songs EP. Singer Ricky Ross elected to sing it as "Message to Michael", rather than "Message to Martha".

In 2000, contemporary jazz saxophonist Michael Lington covered "Message to Michael" on his album Vivid.

During the 1988 US presidential election, George H. W. Bush cited the song's lyrics in his acceptance speech at the Republican Party National Convention saying: "Someone better take 'a message to Michael'", referring to the Democratic Party's presidential candidate Michael Dukakis.
