= Here Where There Is Love =

Studio album by Dionne Warwick
- Released: December 4, 1966
- Recorded: 1966
- Studio: Bell Sound (New York City)
- Genre: Pop, R&B
- Label: Scepter
- Producer: Burt Bacharach, Hal David

Dionne Warwick chronology
Dionne Warwick in Paris (1966)	Here Where There Is Love (1966)	On Stage and in the Movies (1967)

Singles from Here Where There Is Love
- 1. "Trains and Boats and Planes" Released: June 5, 1966; 2. "I Just Don't Know What to Do With Myself" Released: September 19, 1966; 3. "Alfie" Released: March 25, 1967

Professional ratings
Review scores
Source	Rating
AllMusic	3/5 stars

Here Where There Is Love is Dionne Warwick's sixth studio album for Scepter Records, and was released on December 4, 1966. The album was recorded at Bell Sound Studios in New York City and was produced in full by Burt Bacharach and Hal David with Bacharach also arranging and conducting.

== History ==
It was Warwick's first Scepter album to make the top 40, climbing to No. 18 on Billboard's Top LP's chart, and also her first album to be RIAA-certified gold in America, signifying sales of more than 500,000 copies. It also hit No. 1 on Billboard's R&B albums chart. The album's cover art features a photograph of a sunset with two anonymous lovers on a beach.

Two of Warwick's hit singles from 1966 were included on the album: her top 20 covers of Bacharach and David's "Trains and Boats and Planes" and "I Just Don't Know What to Do with Myself". Warwick's version of "Alfie", which she performed at the 1967 Academy Awards, became a bigger top 40 hit than any of the 40-plus versions that had previously been recorded, peaking at No. 15 on the Billboard Hot 100 singles chart in the summer of 1967 during a 17-week chart run. It also reached No. 5 on Billboard's R&B singles chart.

Other songs of note are the Bacharach and David-penned title track; Warwick's reading of "What The World Needs Now Is Love"; Charles Trenet's "I Wish You Love"; and a cover of Bob Dylan's "Blowin' in the Wind".

== Track listing ==
All tracks are written by Burt Bacharach and Hal David, except where noted.

Side one
No.	Title	Length
1.	"Go with Love"	2:47
2.	"What the World Needs Now Is Love"	3:14
3.	"I Just Don't Know What to Do with Myself"	3:50
4.	"Here, Where There Is Love"	2:30
5.	"Trains and Boats and Planes"	2:46

Side two
No.	Title	Writer(s)	Length
6.	"Alfie"		2:43
7.	"As Long as He Needs Me"	Lionel Bart	2:50
8.	"I Wish You Love"	Charles Trenet, Léo Chauliac; English lyrics: Albert Beach	2:49
9.	"(I Never Knew) What You Were Up To"	Ronne Leeman, Richie Druz, Bobby Leeman	2:40
10.	"Blowing in the Wind"	Bob Dylan	2:19

== Charts ==
=== Weekly charts ===
Weekly chart performance for Here Where There Is Love
Chart (1967)	Peak position
UK Albums (OCC)	39
US Top LP's (Billboard)	18
US Top Selling R&B LP's (Billboard)	1
US Top 100 Albums (Cash Box)	32
US Top 100 LP's (Record World)	35

=== Year-end charts ===
Year-end chart performance for Here Where There Is Love
Chart (1967)	Position
US Top Selling R&B LP's (Billboard)	7
US Top 100 Albums (Cash Box)	37

== Certifications and sales ==
Region	Certification	Certified units/sales
United States (RIAA)	Gold	500,000^{^}
^{^} Shipments figures based on certification alone.

== See also ==
- List of Billboard number-one R&B albums of the 1960s
