= Dionne Warwick & the Voices of Christmas =

Studio album by Dionne Warwick
- Released: October 18, 2019
- Genre: Christmas
- Length: 40:30
- Label: Kind; BMG
- Producer: Damon Elliott

Dionne Warwick chronology
She's Back (2019)	Dionne Warwick & the Voices of Christmas (2019)	DWuets (TBA)

Dionne Warwick & the Voices of Christmas is a studio album by American singer Dionne Warwick. It was released by Kind Music and BMG Rights Management on October 18, 2019. Featuring cover versions of Christmas standards and carols, Warwick collaborated with a variety of duet partners on the songs, including Eric Paslay, Aloe Blacc, Michael McDonald, Wanya Morris and duo Chloe x Halle. It debuted and peaked at number 48 on the US Top Holiday Albums.

== Critical reception ==
Rolling Stone editor Connor Ratliff wrote that "there is a kind of Xmas album that a lot of people make and it is this album. If you like that album, here it is again! With Dionne Warwick! And friends!" He found that Dionne Warwick & the Voices of Christmas features "some nice arrangements! But mostly just the same songs, sung this time by Dionne Warwick and some guests."

== Track listing ==
All tracks produced by Damon Elliott.

No.	Title	Writer(s)	Length
1.	"Silent Night"	Traditional	3:05
2.	"Jingle Bells" (featuring John Rich, Ricky Skaggs & The Oak Ridge Boys)	James Lord Pierpont	2:55
3.	"Frosty the Snowman" (featuring Eric Paslay)	Walter "Jack" Rollins; Steve Nelson	3:22
4.	"God Rest Ye Merry Gentlemen" (featuring Dianne Reeves)	Traditional	2:35
5.	"Have Yourself a Merry Little Christmas" (featuring Jason Scheff)	Hugh Martin; Ralph Blane	4:34
6.	"White Christmas" (featuring Johnny Mathis)	Irving Berlin	3:14
7.	"This Christmas" (featuring Aloe Blacc)	Donny Hathaway; Nadine Theresa McKinnor	3:50
8.	"The Christmas Song" (featuring Wanya Morris)	Robert Wells; Mel Tormé	3:30
9.	"Rudolph the Red-Nosed Reindeer" (featuring Andra Day)	Johnny Marks	4:52
10.	"Jingle Bell Rock" (featuring Michael McDonald)	Joe Beal; Jim Boothe	2:22
11.	"Silver Bells" (featuring Chloe x Halle)	Jay Livingston; Ray Evans	3:01
12.	"First Noel"	Traditional	4:11

== Charts ==
Chart (2019)	Peak position
US Top Holiday Albums (Billboard)	48

== Release history ==
Region	Date	Format	Label	Ref.
Various	October 18, 2019	CD; digital download; streaming	Kind; BMG	
