= Promises, Promises (Dionne Warwick album) =

Studio album by Dionne Warwick
- Released: November 1968
- Recorded: 1968
- Studio: A & R (New York City)
- Genres: Pop, R&B, soul
- Length: 33:33
- Label: Scepter
- Producers: Burt Bacharach, Hal David

Dionne Warwick chronology
The Magic of Believing (1968)	Promises, Promises (1968)	Soulful (1969)

Singles from Promises, Promises
- 1. "Who Is Gonna Love Me" Released: August 1968; 2. "Promises, Promises" Released: October 1968; 3. "This Girl's in Love with You" Released: January 1969

Professional ratings
Review scores
Source	Rating
Allmusic	4/5 stars

Promises, Promises is the title of a 1968 album by Dionne Warwick, and her eleventh studio album. Like many of her previous albums, it was produced by the songwriting team of Burt Bacharach and Hal David. The album includes three songs from the musical Promises, Promises, for which Bacharach and David wrote the music and lyrics, and which would premiere a month after the album was released: the title song, "Whoever You Are (I Love You)" and "Wanting Things". The album also includes two other Bacharach/David compositions, "This Girl's in Love with You" (which had originally been recorded by Herb Alpert as "This Guy's in Love with You" earlier that year) and "Who Is Gonna Love Me".

The album includes songs from two other musicals of the time: "Where Is Love?" from Oliver!, and "Where Am I Going?" from Sweet Charity.

The title track peaked at number 19 on the U.S. Billboard Hot 100 the week of December 7, 1968 and No. 7 Easy Listening during the late fall of 1968. "This Girl's in Love with You," the follow-up single, reached number seven in February 1969.

== Track listing ==
All tracks are written by Burt Bacharach and Hal David, except where noted.

Side one
No.	Title	Writer(s)	Length
1.	"Promises, Promises"		2:57
2.	"This Girl's in Love with You"		4:13
3.	"Little Green Apples"	Bobby Russell	3:55
4.	"Where Is Love?"	Lionel Bart	2:48
5.	"Who Is Gonna Love Me"		3:11

Side two
No.	Title	Writer(s)	Length
6.	"Whoever You Are, I Love You"		3:18
7.	"Where Am I Going?"	Peter Matz, Cy Coleman, Dorothy Fields	2:05
8.	"Wanting Things"		2:22
9.	"Lonely in My Heart"	David Williams, Peter Matz	2:56
10.	"Yesterday I Heard the Rain"	Armando Manzanero, Gene Lees	2:43

== Personnel ==
- Dionne Warwick - vocals
- Burt Bacharach, Don Sebesky, Peter Matz - arrangements
- Phil Ramone - audio engineer
- Burt Goldblatt - art direction, cover design
- Michael Freeman - front cover photography

== Charts ==
=== Weekly charts ===
Weekly chart performance for Promises, Promises
Chart (1969)	Peak position
Canada Top 50 Albums (RPM)	15
US Top LP's (Billboard)	18
US Best Selling R&B LP's (Billboard)	7
US Top 100 Albums (Cash Box)	19
US Top 100 LP's (Record World)	15

=== Year-end charts ===
Year-end chart performance for Promises, Promises
Chart (1969)	Position
US Top LP's (Billboard)	32
US Best Selling R&B LP's (Billboard)	9
US Top 100 Albums (Cash Box)	64
