= Soulful (Dionne Warwick album) =

Studio album by Dionne Warwick
- Released: April 1969
- Studio: American Sound (Memphis)
- Genre: Soul, R&B, pop
- Label: Scepter
- Producer: Dionne Warwick, Chips Moman

Dionne Warwick chronology
| Promises, Promises (1968) | Soulful (1969) | I'll Never Fall in Love Again (1970) |

Singles from Soulful
- 1. "You've Lost That Lovin' Feelin'" Released: September 1969

Professional ratings
Review scores
| Source | Rating |
|---|---|
| Allmusic | 3/5 stars |

Soulful is the twelfth album by Dionne Warwick. Released in 1969 on Scepter Records, it was the first of Warwick's Scepter albums that did not directly involve her longtime production and songwriting team of Burt Bacharach and Hal David. Instead, the album was produced by Warwick and Chips Moman and was composed of covers of soul hits and soul-influenced pop songs.

== History ==
Warwick was encouraged to make an R&B album by the surprise appearance of the B-side of her smash hit "Do You Know the Way to San Jose": "Let Me Be Lonely" on the Billboard Hot 100 chart. The gospel-tinged track reached #71 with little to no promotion .

Soulful was recorded at Moman's American Studios in Memphis, Tennessee, and Warwick was backed by the studio houseband comprising Gene Chrisman (drums), Tommy Cogbill (bass), Bobby Emmons (keyboards) and Reggie Young (guitar). Thirteen tracks were recorded: Warwick's renditions of "The Weight", "Loving You Is Sweeter Than Ever" and "The Love of My Man" were not included on the album.

The track "You've Lost That Lovin' Feeling" was the only single released from the album in the U.S. and a success at #16 on the Billboard Hot 100 Singles Chart(#13 R&B). In the UK, Dionne had a minor hit with "People Got to Be Free" written by Rascals Felix Cavaliere & Eddie Brigati. With a #11 peak on the Billboard Hot 200 album chart, Soulful was one of Warwick's more successful albums in the 1960s, due in part to its promotion via full-page newspaper ads placed by Warwick.

In 1972, Scepter released From Within, which included all 13 tracks from the Soulful sessions as well as 13 obscure R&B influenced tracks by Warwick. Issued as Warwick was ending her tenure with Scepter, From Within reached #169; the tracks "The Love of My Man" and "I'm Your Puppet" were issued as singles respectively bubbling under the Hot 100 at #107 and #113.

In January 2004, Rhino Handmade issued the limited edition (5000 copies) Soulful Plus an internet-only purchase disc comprising the 13 tracks from the Soulful sessions plus nine obscure R&B influenced tracks by Warwick and a previously unreleased version of "Put a Little Love in Your Heart".

== Track listing ==
Side one
| No. | Title | Writer(s) | Length |
|---|---|---|---|
| 1. | "You've Lost That Lovin' Feeling" | Barry Mann, Cynthia Weil, Phil Spector | 4:23 |
| 2. | "I'm Your Puppet" | Dan Penn, Linden Oldham | 3:02 |
| 3. | "People Got to Be Free" | Felix Cavaliere, Eddie Brigati | 2:55 |
| 4. | "You're All I Need to Get By" | Nickolas Ashford, Valerie Simpson | 2:24 |
| 5. | "We Can Work It Out" | John Lennon, Paul McCartney | 2:30 |

Side two
| No. | Title | Writer(s) | Length |
|---|---|---|---|
| 6. | "A Hard Day's Night" | Lennon, McCartney | 3:03 |
| 7. | "Do Right Woman - Do Right Man" | Dan Penn, Lincoln Moman | 3:00 |
| 8. | "I've Been Loving You Too Long" | Otis Redding, Jerry Butler | 3:31 |
| 9. | "People Get Ready" | Curtis Mayfield | 2:44 |
| 10. | "Hey Jude" | Lennon, McCartney | 4:02 |

== Personnel ==
- Dionne Warwick - vocals
- Reggie Young - guitar
- Tommy Cogbill - bass
- Bobby Emmons - piano
- Gene Chrisman - drums
- Mike Leech - string arrangements

== Charts ==
=== Weekly charts ===
Weekly chart performance for Soulful
| Chart (1969) | Peak position |
|---|---|
| Canada Top 50 Albums (RPM) | 16 |
| Norwegian Albums (VG-lista) | 18 |
| US Top LP's (Billboard) | 11 |
| US Best Selling R&B LP's (Billboard) | 2 |
| US Top 100 Albums (Cash Box) | 11 |
| US Top 100 LP's (Record World) | 10 |

=== Year-end charts ===
Year-end chart performance for Soulful
| Chart (1969) | Position |
|---|---|
| US Top LP's (Billboard) | 73 |
| US Best Selling R&B LP's (Billboard) | 19 |
| US Top 100 Albums (Cash Box) | 70 |
