= Very Dionne =

Studio album by Dionne Warwick
- Released: December 1970
- Studio: A&R (New York City); United (Hollywood, California); A&M (Hollywood, California); Garden State Arts Center (Holmdel, New Jersey)
- Genre: Pop, R&B, soul
- Label: Scepter
- Producer: Burt Bacharach, Hal David

Dionne Warwick chronology
I'll Never Fall in Love Again (1970)	Very Dionne (1970)	Dionne (1972)

Singles from Very Dionne
- 1. "Make It Easy On Yourself" Released: September 1970; 2. "The Green Grass Starts to Grow" Released: November 1970

Professional ratings
Review scores
Source	Rating
Allmusic	3/5 stars

Very Dionne is the fourteenth studio album by American singer Dionne Warwick, released in 1970 on the Scepter label. It was produced by Burt Bacharach and Hal David. It would be her final album recorded with Scepter before signing with Warner Bros. Records.

== History ==
The album is notable for including the single "The Green Grass Starts to Grow".

== Track listing ==
All tracks are written by Burt Bacharach and Hal David, except where noted.

Side one
No.	Title	Writer(s)	Length
1.	"Check Out Time"		4:06
2.	"Yesterday"	John Lennon, Paul McCartney	2:36
3.	"We've Only Just Begun"	Paul Williams, Roger Nichols	3:07
4.	"Here's That Rainy Day"	Jimmy Van Heusen, Johnny Burke	3:35
5.	"The Green Grass Starts to Grow"		3:00

Side two
No.	Title	Writer(s)	Length
6.	"They Don't Give Medals to Yesterday's Heroes"		2:55
7.	"Walk the Way You Talk"		2:50
8.	"Make It Easy on Yourself"		3:34
9.	"Going Out Of My Head"	Teddy Randazzo, Bobby Weinstein	3:08
10.	"I Got Love"	Gary Geld, Peter Udell	2:26

== Personnel ==
- Dionne Warwick - vocals
- Burt Bacharach, Marty Paich, Larry Wilcox - arrangements, conducting
- Armin Steiner, Larry Levine, Michael Wright, Phil Ramone - engineer
- Dick Smith - art direction
- Harry Langdon - photography

== Charts ==
=== Weekly charts ===
Weekly chart performance for Very Dionne
Chart (1971)	Peak position
Canada Top 100 Albums (RPM)	35
Norwegian Albums (VG-lista)	14
US Top LP's (Billboard)	37
US Best Selling Soul LP's (Billboard)	8
US Top 100 Albums (Cash Box)	31
US The Album Chart (Record World)	24

=== Year-end charts ===
Year-end chart performance for Very Dionne
Chart (1971)	Position
US Best Selling Soul LP's (Billboard)	26
