= Dionne Warwick in Paris =

Live album by Dionne Warwick
- Released: April 14, 1966
- Recorded: January 1966
- Venue: Olympia, Paris
- Genre: R&B
- Label: Scepter
- Producer: Burt Bacharach, Hal David

Dionne Warwick chronology
Here I Am (1965)	Dionne Warwick in Paris (1966)	Here Where There Is Love (1966)

Singles from Dionne Warwick in Paris
- 1. "Message to Michael" Released: March 1966

Professional ratings
Review scores
Source	Rating
Allmusic	3/5 stars
Record Mirror	4/5 stars

Dionne Warwick in Paris is Dionne Warwick's sixth album, and was released on April 14, 1966 on Scepter Records. It was recorded during Warwick's five-week engagement at the Paris Olympia in January 1966 and was released shortly after the tour was completed. The LP was issued as number 534 in the Scepter Catalog. The liner of this LP is pink with three pictures of Warwick side-by-side, not unlike the Make Way for Dionne Warwick album two years earlier.

== History ==
The album featured a major hit single that almost didn't happen: "Message to Michael". Robin Platts says in his book, Burt Bacharach & Hal David, that Warwick was at the Olympia as co-star of "The Sacha Show" alongside Sacha Distel, a French heartthrob that Florence Greenberg was considering signing to Scepter. Distel wanted to record a version of Bacharach and David's "Message to Martha" and had asked Warwick to record a guide vocal. Warwick re-gendered the piece to suit her, and when executives at Scepter heard the recording, a single was issued. Bacharach and David were convinced that the song was better recorded by a man, but nonetheless agreed that Warwick's version was a stunning one indeed.

"Message to Michael" was arranged and recorded by Jacques Denjean, thus becoming the first real single for Warwick at Scepter to not be produced by Bacharach and David. The single peaked at number eight on the Billboard charts. Additionally, according to Platts, the decision to release "Message to Michael" was largely due to the efforts of Scepter promotion executive (and a singer in his own right) Steve Tyrell.

Though the album included French versions of "A House Is Not A Home" and "You'll Never Get To Heaven (If You Break My Heart)", these were essentially phonetically-read versions over the same studio tracks of the original singles, and therefore not included in the actual performance. The album's liner quotes a Variety reviewer as stating that Warwick was "one Yank singer who could put over her wares completely in English and hit big."

Another song of note on the album is Cole Porter's "I Love Paris" which Warwick performed after being introduced on stage by Distel.

== Track listing ==
Side one
No.	Title	Writer(s)	Length
1.	"I Love Paris"	Cole Porter	2:30
2.	"C'est si bon"	Henri Betti, André Hornez, Jerry Seelen	3:00
3.	"Message to Michael"	Burt Bacharach, Hal David	3:10
4.	"A House Is Not a Home" (French)	Bacharach, David	3:10
5.	"Walk On By"	Bacharach, David	3:00

Side two
No.	Title	Writer(s)	Length
6.	"Oh Yeah Yeah Yeah" (English and French with Sacha Distel)	Distel, Maurice Tézé	3:50
7.	"The Good Life"	Jack Reardon, Distel	3:17
8.	"La Vie en rose" (English and French)	Édith Piaf, Louiguy	3:00
9.	"You'll Never Get to Heaven" (French)	Bacharach, David	3:05
10.	"What'd I Say"	Ray Charles	3:14

== Personnel ==
- Dionne Warwick – vocals
- Burt Goldblatt – cover design, photography

== Charts ==
Chart performance for Dionne Warwick in Paris
Chart (1966)	Peak position
US Top LP's (Billboard)	76
US Top Selling R&B LP's (Billboard)	3
US Top 100 Albums (Cash Box)	56
US Top 100 LP's (Record World)	69
