= The Windows of the World (song) =

- Spanish release picture sleeve

Single by Dionne Warwick

from the album The Windows of the World
- B-side: "Walk Little Dolly"
- Released: July 1967
- Recorded: 1967
- Length: 3:17
- Label: Scepter
- Songwriters: Burt Bacharach, Hal David
- Producers: Burt Bacharach, Hal David

Dionne Warwick singles chronology
"Alfie" (1967)	"The Windows of the World" (1967)	"I Say a Little Prayer" / "(Theme From) Valley of the Dolls" (1967)

"The Windows of the World" is a song written by Burt Bacharach (music) and Hal David (lyrics) which was a hit single for Dionne Warwick in 1967.

== Background ==
"The Windows of the World" represented a thematic departure for Warwick who had built her career as a romantic balladeer and had passed on the chance to introduce "What the World Needs Now is Love" (although her stated objection to the last-named was not its theme but rather that it sounded "too country"). The track was recorded in a 13 April 1967 session produced by Bacharach and David with Bacharach as conductor and arranger. Bacharach and David had scored a number 7 hit in 1965 with Jackie DeShannon's message song hit "What the World Needs Now is Love" but "The Windows of the World" was unique in the composers' canon in being a protest song. Inspired by such songs as "Where Have All the Flowers Gone?" and "Blowin' in the Wind", Hal David wrote lyrics for "The Windows of the World" which overtly but gently lament U.S. involvement in the Vietnam War (an especial concern to David, who had two young sons, one of them almost of eligible age for the draft). The arrangement for "The Windows of the World" has a subtle Asian flavor featuring strings plucked in the style of a koto and also finger cymbals the latter evoking the sound of raindrops on a window.

== Chart performance ==
Released in July 1967, "The Windows of the World" was not one of Warwick's biggest hits, reaching number 32 on the Billboard Hot 100 and number 27 on the R&B charts. "The Windows of the World" was also a minor hit on the Easy Listening chart, where it peaked at number 32. Despite its moderate showing on the charts, Warwick stated in 2002 that "The Windows of the World" was her favorite of all of her singles. Warwick's September 1967 album release featured "The Windows of The World" as its title cut (see The Windows of the World). The album cut "I Say a Little Prayer" was released that October as a single and proved to be the track which would re-establish Dionne Warwick as a Top Ten hitmaker.

== Track listings and formats ==
- US, 7" Vinyl single

A: "The Windows of the World" – 3:17
B: "Walk Little Dolly" – 3:20

== Credits ==
- Arranged, Conductor – Burt Bacharach
- Producer – Bacharach-David
- Written-By – Burt Bacharach, Hal David

== Charts ==
=== Weekly charts ===
Chart (1967)	Peak position
Canada Top Singles (RPM)	20
US Billboard Hot 100	32
US Hot R&B/Hip-Hop Songs (Billboard)	27
US Adult Contemporary (Billboard)	32

== Cover versions ==
"The Windows of the World" has also been recorded by:

- Scott Walker (Scott 2 - 1968)
- The Icelandic rendering "Regn Óréttlætisins" was recorded by Hljómar for their 1968 eponymous album.
- Jimmie Rodgers (The Windmills of Your Mind - 1969)
- Rita Reys (Rita Reys sings Burt Bacharach - 1971)
- Isaac Hayes ("Live at The Sahara Tahoe" - 1973)
- The Pretenders (on the multi-artist album for the soundtrack to the film 1969 - 1988)
- Ronald Isley with Burt Bacharach (Isley Meets Bacharach - 2003)
- Trijntje Oosterhuis (The Look of Love - 2006).
- Bobbie Gentry's rendition of the song was included on her 2007 compilation The Best of Bobbie Gentry: The Capitol Years.
- Dionne Warwick also recorded an Italian-language version of "The Windows of the World" as "La Vita Come Va" ([the] life as it should be).
- Rumer's version of the song was included on her 2015 compilation B-Sides and Rarities.

== Bibliography ==
- Serene Dominic. Burt Bacharach, song by song: the ultimate Burt Bacharach reference for fans. Schirmer Trade (New York NY) 2003. ISBN 0-8256-7280-5
