= Do You Know the Way to San Jose =

Song by Burt Bacharach with lyrics by Hal David; performed by Dionne Warwick

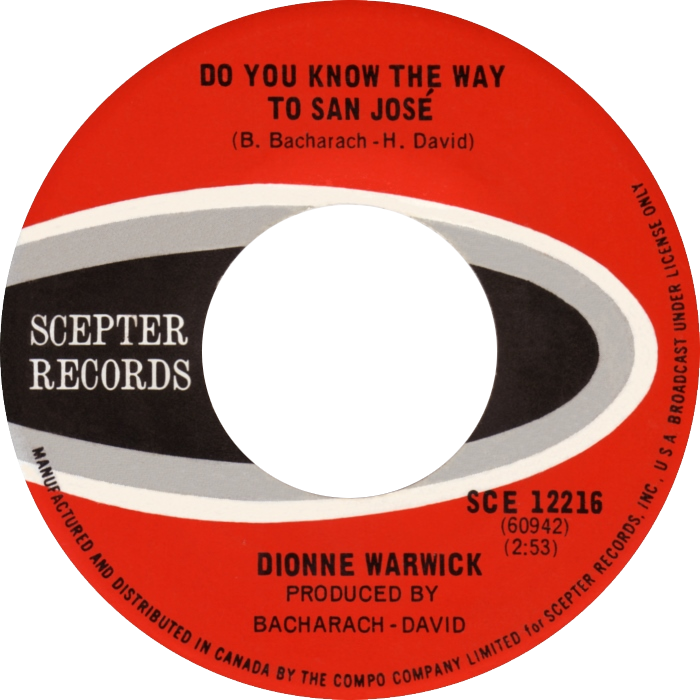
- Side A of the Canadian single

Single by Dionne Warwick

from the album Dionne Warwick in Valley of the Dolls
- B-side: "Let Me Be Lonely"
- Released: April 1968
- Recorded: 1967
- Studio: Bell Sound (New York City)
- Genre: Pop; soul
- Length: 2:58
- Label: Scepter SCE-12216
- Songwriters: Burt Bacharach, Hal David
- Producers: Burt Bacharach, Hal David

Dionne Warwick singles chronology
"(Theme from) Valley of the Dolls" (1968)	"Do You Know the Way to San Jose" (1968)	"Who Is Gonna Love Me" (1968)

"Do You Know the Way to San Jose" is a 1968 popular song written and composed for singer Dionne Warwick by Burt Bacharach. Hal David wrote the lyrics. The song was Warwick's biggest international hit to that point, selling several million copies worldwide and winning Warwick her first Grammy Award. David's lyrics tell the story of a native of San Jose, California, who, having failed to break into the entertainment field in Los Angeles, is set to return to her hometown.

The song was released on the 1968 RIAA Certified Gold album Dionne Warwick in Valley of the Dolls. "Do You Know the Way to San Jose" was issued as the follow-up single to the double-sided hit "(Theme from) Valley of the Dolls" / "I Say a Little Prayer" in April 1968. It became Warwick's third consecutive top ten song in the closing months of 1967 and into 1968, punctuating the most successful period of her recording career.

The song peaked at No. 8 in the UK, Ireland, and Canada. It also charted highly in France, Italy, South Africa, Australia, Germany, Brazil, Mexico, Israel, Lebanon, Japan, and many other countries throughout the world. The single was one of the most successful of Warwick's international hits, selling over 3,500,000 copies worldwide. The flip-side of the single, "Let Me Be Lonely", also penned by Bacharach and David, charted in the Billboard Hot 100 as well and became one of many double-sided hits for Warwick.

== Production ==
Bacharach had composed the music for the song before David wrote its lyrics. David had a special interest in San Jose, having been stationed there while in the Navy.

The track was the last Dionne Warwick single to be recorded at New York City's Bell Sound Studios. It features a prominent use of bass drum, played by session musician Gary Chester. The engineer was Ed Smith, who devised the famous introduction to the tune by directly attaching a microphone to the head of Chester's bass drum. The electric bass was played by studio musician Lou Mauro.

Warwick did not like "Do You Know the Way to San Jose", and she had to be convinced to record it. In a May 1983 interview with Ebony, she said: "It's a dumb song and I didn't want to sing it. But it was a hit, just like [her recent Top Ten hit] 'Heartbreaker' is. I'm happy these songs were successful, but that still doesn't change my opinion about them." Though she still does not like it, the song remains one of Warwick's most popular chart selections, and she still includes it in almost every concert she performs.

== Awards ==
In 1969, Warwick won her first Grammy Award for Best Female Pop Vocal Performance, for "Do You Know the Way to San Jose". She told Jet in May 2002; "that winning this award was the overall highlight of her career".

Warwick was only the second black female artist to win in the category after jazz vocalist Ella Fitzgerald and the first artist of the contemporary pop era to win in that category.

Her historic win paved the way for contemporary black pop artists such as Roberta Flack, Tina Turner and Warwick's kid cousin Whitney Houston, who later won the award with their respective releases.

== Charts ==
=== Weekly charts ===
Chart (1968)	Peak position
Australia (Kent Music Report)	15
Canada Top Singles (RPM)	8
Ireland (IRMA)	8
New Zealand (NZ Music Chart)	20
UK Singles (OCC)	8
US Billboard Hot 100	10
US Hot Rhythm & Blues Singles (Billboard)	23
US Adult Contemporary (Billboard)	4
US Cash Box Top 100	2
US Record World Top 100	1

=== Year-end charts ===
Chart (1968)	Peak position
US Billboard Hot 100	88

== Cover versions ==
- Connie Francis included a recording of the song on her tribute album Connie Francis Sings Bacharach & David (1968).
- Ray Conniff & The Singers included a version on their album Turn Around Look At Me (1968).
- Ramsey Lewis released an instrumental jazz interpretation on his album Maiden Voyage (1968).
- Ed Ames recorded a version for his album The Apogee of Ed Ames (1968).
- Composer Burt Bacharach recorded an instrumental arrangement of the song for his album Make It Easy on Yourself (1969).
- Bossa Rio, the Brazilian group formed by Sérgio Mendes, released a version on their self-titled album in 1969.
- The Carpenters incorporated the song into a Burt Bacharach and Hal David medley on their album Close to You (1970).
- Sandi Griffiths and Sally Flynn, performing as Sandi & Sally, performed the song twice on The Lawrence Welk Show (in 1968 and 1969).
- Frankie Goes to Hollywood covered the track on their debut album Welcome to the Pleasuredome (1984).
- Workshy recorded a version for their album Under the Sun (1997).
- The Avalanches released a cover on their promotional release The Avalanches Have Landed (2001).
- Trijntje Oosterhuis recorded the song accompanied by Metropole Orkest for her tribute album The Look of Love: Burt Bacharach Songbook (2006).

== In popular culture ==
- The song is featured in the 1997 romantic comedy film My Best Friend's Wedding, directed by P. J. Hogan and starring Julia Roberts and Rupert Everett. In a memorable lunch scene, the characters played by Everett, Rachel Griffiths, and Carrie Preston spontaneously break into the song, with Everett's character unable to resist joining in.
