= I'll Never Fall in Love Again (album) =

Studio album by Dionne Warwick
- Released: April 27, 1970
- Genre: Pop, R&B
- Label: Scepter
- Producer: Burt Bacharach, Hal David

Dionne Warwick chronology
Soulful (1969)	I'll Never Fall in Love Again (1970)	Very Dionne (1970)

Singles from I'll Never Fall in Love Again
- 1. "I'll Never Fall in Love Again" Released: December 15, 1969; 2. "Let Me Go to Him" Released: April 1970; 3. "Paper Mache" Released: June 1970

Professional ratings
Review scores
Source	Rating
Allmusic	4/5 stars

I'll Never Fall in Love Again is the thirteenth studio album by American singer Dionne Warwick, released on April 27, 1970 by the Scepter label. It was produced by Burt Bacharach and Hal David. In 1971, the album won the Grammy Award for Best Female Pop Vocal Performance.

== History ==
The album is notable for including the title track, which became Warwick's eighth top ten hit on the Billboard Hot 100, peaking at number 6. Also featured are two other chart singles: "Let Me Go to Him" and "Paper Maché".

== Track listing ==
All tracks are written by Burt Bacharach and Hal David, except where noted.

Side one
No.	Title	Writer(s)	Length
1.	"The Wine Is Young"		3:39
2.	"I'll Never Fall in Love Again"		2:52
3.	"Raindrops Keep Falling on My Head"		2:56
4.	"Loneliness Remembers What Happiness Forgets"		2:05
5.	"Something"	George Harrison	2:25

Side two
No.	Title	Writer(s)	Length
6.	"Paper Maché"		2:56
7.	"Knowing When to Leave"		2:41
8.	"Let Me Go to Him"		3:25
9.	"Didn't We"	Jimmy Webb	2:43
10.	"My Way"	Jacques Revaux; Paul Anka	3:25

== Personnel ==
- Dionne Warwick - vocals
- Burt Bacharach, Larry Wilcox - arrangements
- Larry Levine, Phil Ramone - audio engineer
- Burt Goldblatt - art direction, cover design
- Harry Langdon - photography

== Charts ==
=== Weekly charts ===
Weekly chart performance for I'll Never Fall in Love Again
Chart (1970)	Peak position
Australian Albums (Kent Music Report)	13
Canada Top 100 Albums (RPM)	31
Norwegian Albums (VG-lista)	9
US Top LP's (Billboard)	23
US Best Selling Soul LP's (Billboard)	7
US Top 100 Albums (Cash Box)	29
US Top 100 LP's (Record World)	29

=== Year-end charts ===
Year-end chart performance for I'll Never Fall in Love Again
Chart (1970)	Position
US Top LP's (Billboard)	70
US Best Selling Soul LP's (Billboard)	18
US Top 100 Albums (Cash Box)	96
