= The Love Collection (Dionne Warwick album) =

Compilation album by Dionne Warwick
- Released: March 25, 2008
- Recorded: 1962–1989
- Genre: Pop, soul, adult contemporary
- Length: 69:39
- Label: Warner Strategic Marketing; Legacy Recordings; Columbia Records; Sony BMG

Dionne Warwick chronology
Why We Sing (2008)	The Love Collection (2008)	Only Trust Your Heart (2011)

Professional ratings
Review scores
Source	Rating
AllMusic	3.5/5 stars

The Love Collection is a compilation of love songs by American singer/songwriter/producer Dionne Warwick. The album was released by Legacy/WSM in 2008.

== Track listing ==
1. "Heartbreaker"
2. "Walk On By"
3. "I Say a Little Prayer
4. "Do You Know the Way to San José"
5. "All The Love in the World"
6. "That's What Friends Are For" (with Elton John, Stevie Wonder & Gladys Knight)
7. "Deja Vu"
8. "So Amazing"
9. "It's You" (with Stevie Wonder)
10. "The Look of Love"
11. "How Many Times Can We Say Goodbye" (with Luther Vandross)
12. "Anyone Who Had a Heart"
13. "Friends in Love" (with Johnny Mathis)
14. "I Don't Need Another Love" (with The Detroit Spinners)
15. "I'll Never Fall in Love Again"
16. "Reach Out for Me"
17. "Love Power" (with Jeffrey Osborne & Kenny G)
18. "They Long to Be (Close to You)"
19. "I Just Don't Know What to Do with Myself"
20. "What the World Needs Now Is Love"

== Charts ==
Chart performance for The Love Collection
Chart (2008)	Peak position
Australian Albums (ARIA)	26
New Zealand Albums (RMNZ)	11
Scottish Albums (OCC)	48
UK Albums (OCC)	26
