= (Theme from) Valley of the Dolls =

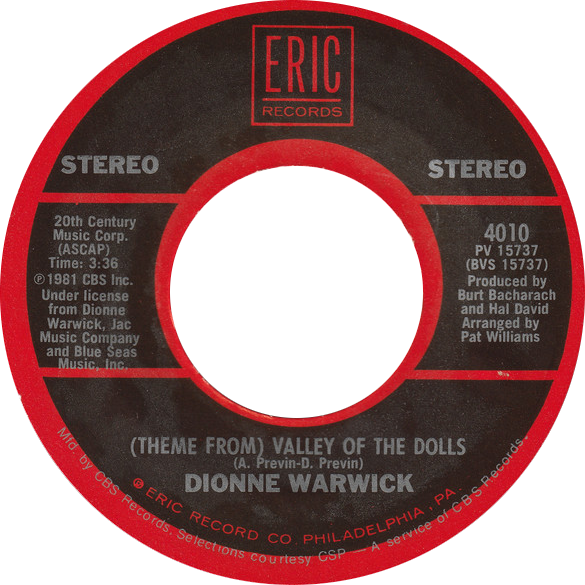
- One of US reissues (Eric Records)

Single by Dionne Warwick

from the album Dionne Warwick in Valley of the Dolls
- A-side: "I Say a Little Prayer"
- Published: January 22, 1968 by Twentieth Century Music Corp. (original copyright April 7, 1967)
- Released: October 1967
- Recorded: 1967
- Studio: A&R Recording Studios, New York City
- Genre: Soul, pop
- Length: 3:40
- Label: Scepter
- Songwriters: André Previn, Dory Previn
- Producers: Burt Bacharach, Hal David

Dionne Warwick singles chronology
"The Windows of the World" (1967)	"(Theme from) Valley of the Dolls" (1967)	"Do You Know the Way to San Jose" (1968)

"(Theme from) Valley of the Dolls" is a 1967 song by André and Dory Previn, composed for the film version of the Jacqueline Susann novel Valley of the Dolls, and recorded by Dionne Warwick.

== Background ==
Actress Barbara Parkins, who starred in the motion picture, suggested that Warwick be considered to sing the film's theme song. The song was to be given to Judy Garland, who had been fired from the film. A recording by Warwick appeared on the B-side of her (original) single of Burt Bacharach and Hal David's "I Say a Little Prayer", a big hit which peaked at no. 4 on Billboard's Hot 100 in the chart dated 9 December 1967 and which was RIAA-certified gold in February 1968. Warwick re-recorded a Pat Williams-arranged and Burt Bacharach-produced version of the theme at A&R Studios in New York because contractual restrictions from her home label, Scepter Records, would not allow her version from the film to be included on the 20th Century-Fox soundtrack album. In April 1968, the RIAA-certified gold Scepter LP that contained the hit version of the song, Dionne Warwick in Valley of the Dolls, peaked at no. 6 on the Billboard album chart, and would remain on the chart for more than a year.

Charlie Blaum states ""Valley" had all the ingredients of a huge hit: a great singer at the top of her game, a gorgeous melody, an inviting arrangement, and most of all the haunting, soulful lyric by Dory Previn — look her up. She had a rough life; she wrote of vulnerability and uncertainty bordering on despair from a fragile place deep within".

== Charts ==
In January 1968, when the film Valley of the Dolls dominated the US box office, B-side "Valley of the Dolls" entered the Hot 100 in its own right. It reached no. 2, where in February and March it remained for four weeks. It also reached no. 2 on the Easy Listening chart, no. 2 on the Cash Box Top 100 and number one on the Record World chart. "Valley of the Dolls" got to number one on many radio stations across America, among them WLS in Chicago. In the UK, "(Theme from) Valley of the Dolls" was released in February 1968, with "Zip-a-Dee-Doo-Dah" as the B-side. The single peaked at no. 28 – the singer's first UK chart hit since 1965.

=== Weekly charts ===
Chart (1967–68)	Peak position
UK Singles (OCC)	28
US Billboard Hot 100	2
US Hot R&B/Hip-Hop Songs (Billboard)	13
US Adult Contemporary (Billboard)	2
US Cash Box Top 100	2
US Record World Top 100	1

=== Certifications ===
Region	Certification	Certified units/sales
United States (RIAA)	Gold	1,000,000^{^}
^{^} Shipments figures based on certification alone.

== Other recorded versions ==
- Tony Bennett - album I've Gotta Be Me (1969)
- Patty Duke – album Patty Duke Sings Songs from Valley of the Dolls and other Selections (1967)
- Gladys Knight & the Pips – album Silk N' Soul (1968)
- Andy Williams – album Honey (1968)
- Jack Jones – album Where is Love? (1968, RCA)
- John Davidson - album Goin' Places (1968)
- Dorothy Ashby – album Afro-Harping (1968)
- Gábor Szabó – album Bacchanal (1968, Skye Records)
- The Chopsticks – album Some Day (1970)
- Eruption – album Leave a Light (1979)
- k.d. lang – album Drag (1997)
- Marcia Hines – album Time of Our Lives (1999)
- Ana Gasteyer – album I'm Hip (2014)
