= The Magic of Believing =

Studio album by Dionne Warwick featuring the Drinkard Singers
- Released: June 1968
- Recorded: 1968
- Studio: Scepter Studios, New York City
- Genre: Gospel
- Length: 28:49
- Label: Scepter Records

Dionne Warwick featuring the Drinkard Singers chronology
Dionne Warwick in Valley of the Dolls (1968)	The Magic of Believing (1968)	Promises, Promises (1968)

The Magic of Believing is the tenth studio album by American singer Dionne Warwick. It was released in 1968 on Scepter Records special for Easter. The singer recorded this album entirely in the genre of gospel music. The band Drinkard Singers, which included Warwick's closest relatives, took part in the recording of the album.

== Critical reception ==
Professional ratings
Review scores
Source	Rating
AllMusic	3/5 stars
The Encyclopedia of Popular Music	3/5 stars

The Billboard reviewer stated that Warwick's warm, inspirational style works the same chart magic for these devotional standards that mark her top ten records. Record World called the album "a masterpiece in itself."

William Ruhlmann from AllMusic wrote: "Fans of Warwick's pop-soul records will at times have difficulty recognizing her here; she occasionally sings in a higher register than usual, and she is often more overtly emotional than on her deliberately restrained pop hits. Clearly, however, this is music close to her heart, and she and the Drinkards perform it without any concessions to pop style; this is traditional gospel music, traditionally sung."

== Track listing ==
Side A
No.	Title	Writer(s)	Length
1.	"The Battle Hymn of the Republic"	Traditional	3:09
2.	"Somebody Bigger Than You and I"	Johnny Lange; Hy Heath; Sonny Burke	3:37
3.	"Jesus Will"	James Cleveland	3:04
4.	"Old Landmark"	Traditional	2:48
5.	"The Magic of Believing"	Norman Monath; Raymond Leveen	2:32
Total length:			15:10

Side B
No.	Title	Writer(s)	Length
1.	"Blessed Be the Name of the Lord"	Traditional	2:48
2.	"Grace"	James Cleveland	3:20
3.	"Steal Away"	Traditional	2:35
4.	"In the Garden"	C. Austin Miles	3:07
5.	"Who Do You Think It Was"	Traditional	1:49
Total length:			13:39

== Personnel ==
- Dionne Warwick – vocals, arrangement (A1, A4, B3)
- Cissy Houston – arrangement (B1)
- Roberta Martin – arrangement (B2)
- Ann Moss – arrangement (B5)
- Burt Goldblatt – art direction, design
- The Drinkard Singers – vocals
- John Lakata – engineering
- Fred Kirby – liner notes

Credits are adapted from the album's liner notes.

== Charts ==
Сhart performance for The Magic of Believing
Chart (1968)	Peak position
US Best Selling R&B LP's (Billboard)	49
