= I Say a Little Prayer =

1967 song by Burt Bacharach and Hal David

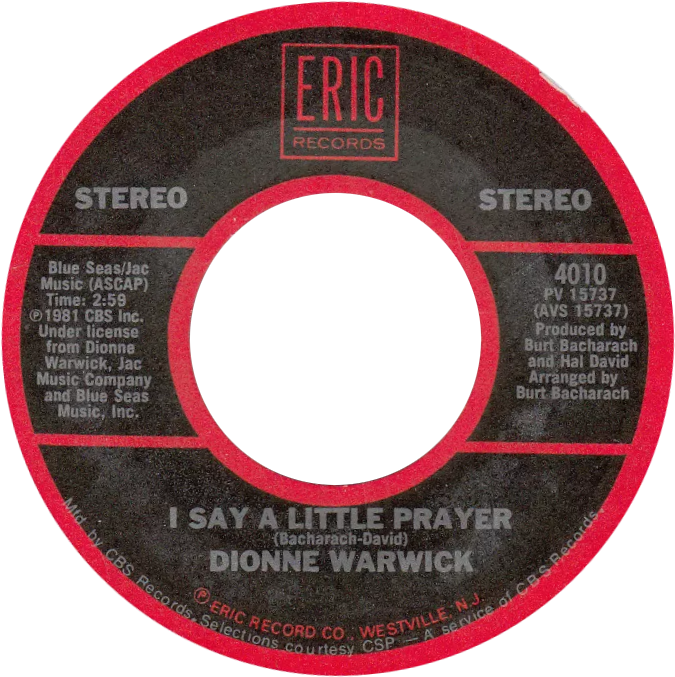
- One of US reissues (Eric Records)

Single by Dionne Warwick

from the album The Windows of the World
- B-side: "(Theme from) Valley of the Dolls"
- Released: October 1967
- Recorded: April 9, 1966
- Studio: A & R (New York City)
- Genre: Soul; pop; Brill Building
- Length: 3:09
- Label: Scepter
- Songwriters: Burt Bacharach; Hal David
- Producers: Burt Bacharach; Hal David

Dionne Warwick singles chronology
"The Windows of the World" (1967)	"I Say a Little Prayer" (1967)	"Do You Know the Way to San Jose" (1968)

Live video
- "I Say A Little Prayer" on YouTube

"I Say a Little Prayer" is a song written by Burt Bacharach and Hal David for the American singer Dionne Warwick, originally peaking at number four on the US Billboard Hot 100 pop singles chart in December 1967. On the R&B Singles chart it peaked at number eight. The following year, it was a top ten hit for another American singer, Aretha Franklin.

== Dionne Warwick original ==
Intended by the lyricist Hal David to convey a woman's concern for her man who is serving in the Vietnam War, "I Say a Little Prayer" was recorded by Dionne Warwick in an April 9, 1966, session. Although Bacharach's recordings with Warwick typically took no more than three takes (often only taking one), Bacharach did ten takes on "I Say a Little Prayer" and still disliked the completed track, feeling it was rushed.

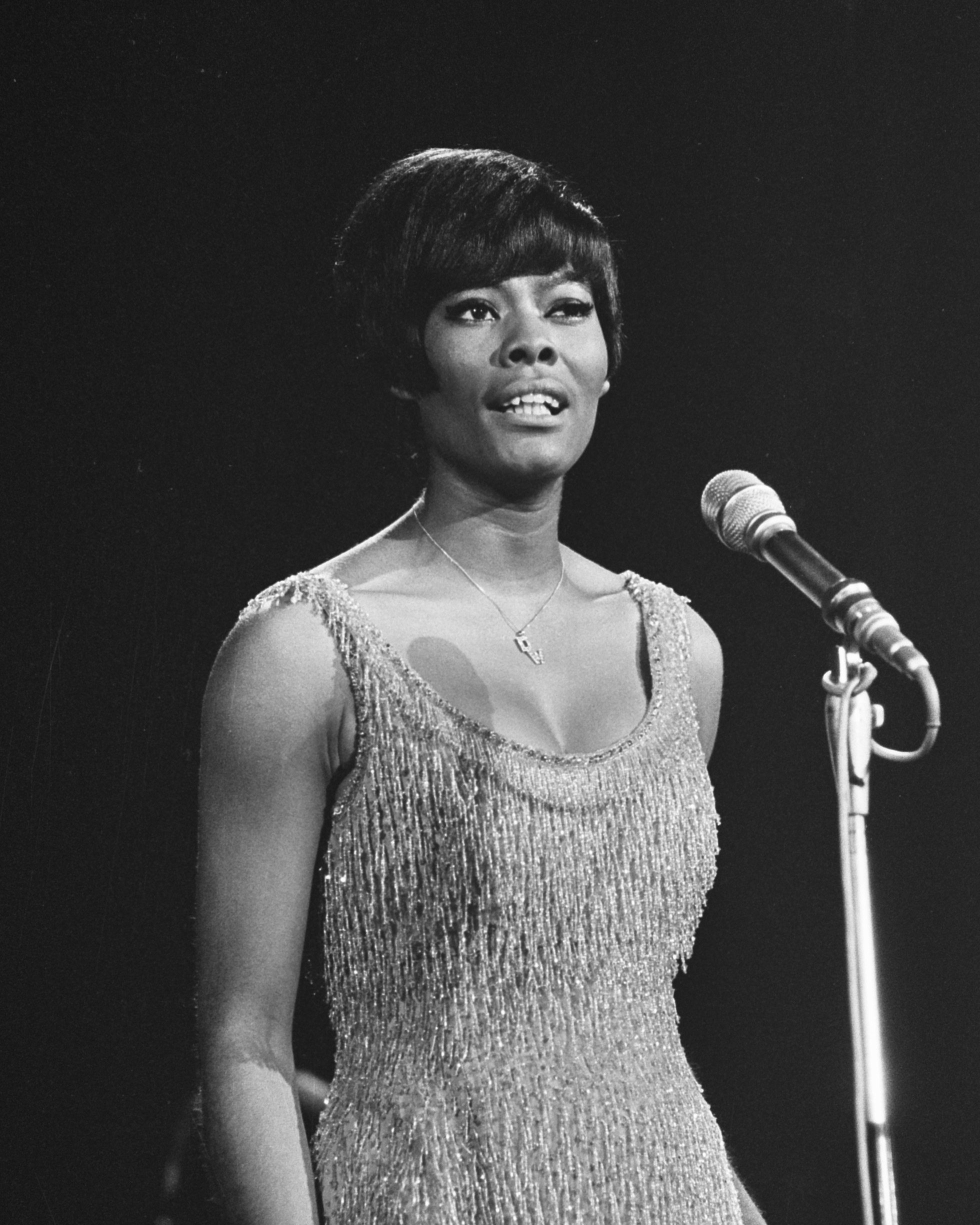
Dionne Warwick, 1966

The track was unreleased until September 1967, when it was introduced on the album The Windows of the World and it was Scepter Records owner Florence Greenberg rather than Bacharach who wanted "I Say a Little Prayer" added to that album. When disc jockeys from the United States began playing the album track in October 1967, significant airplay led Scepter Records to release the track as a single, backed with newly recorded track "(Theme from) Valley of the Dolls".

The brisk sound of "I Say a Little Prayer" that Bacharach disliked proved to be a million-selling hit for Warwick, as "I Say a Little Prayer" reached No. 4 that December on the Billboard Hot 100, No. 8 on the Billboard R&B chart, No. 4 on the Canadian chart and No. 4 on the Record World 100 Top Pops chart as well. "(Theme from) Valley of the Dolls", the B-side would become another hit for Warwick reaching No. 2 in February 1968 on the Billboard Hot 100 and No. 1 on the Record World chart. Warwick's "I Say a Little Prayer" single would receive gold certification from the RIAA for sales of a million units in January 1968. "I Say a Little Prayer" b/w "(Theme from) Valley of the Dolls" became one of the most successful double-sided hits of the rock era.

Like several Bacharach compositions, both sides contain passages written in unusual time signatures. The verses of "Prayer" are constructed of two successive measures of 4/4, a measure of 6/4, and three final measures of 4/4. The chorus is in 4/4 + 3/4 + 4/4.

=== Charts ===
==== Weekly charts ====
Chart (1967–1968)	Peak position
Australia (Go-Set)	77
Canada Top Singles (RPM)	4
US Billboard Hot 100	4
US Hot Rhythm & Blues Singles (Billboard)	8
US Cash Box Top 100	5
US Record World 100 Top Pops	4

==== Year-end charts ====
Chart (1967)	Rank
Canada Top Singles (RPM)	46
US (Joel Whitburn's Pop Annual)	48

=== Certifications ===
Region	Certification	Certified units/sales
United States (RIAA)	Gold	1,000,000^{^}
^{^} Shipments figures based on certification alone.

== Aretha Franklin version ==
"I Say a Little Prayer"
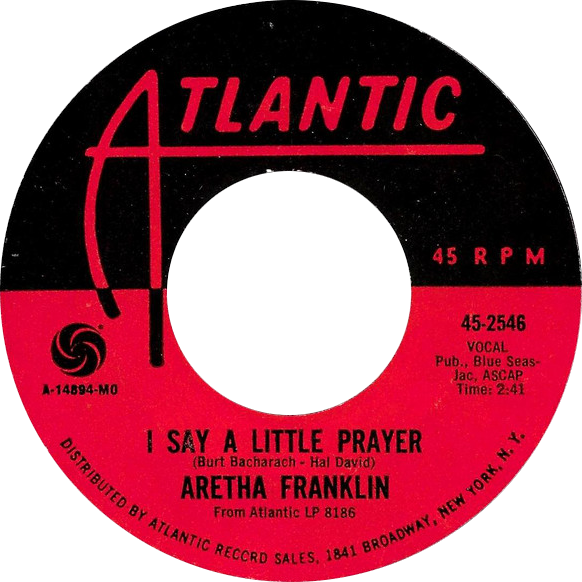
- Side B of the US single

Single by Aretha Franklin

from the album Aretha Now
- A-side: "The House That Jack Built"
- Released: July 26, 1968
- Studio: Atlantic (New York City)
- Genre: Soul; R&B; gospel
- Length: 3:30
- Label: Atlantic
- Songwriters: Burt Bacharach; Hal David
- Producer: Jerry Wexler

Aretha Franklin singles chronology
"Think" (1968)	"I Say a Little Prayer" (1968)	"See Saw" (1968)

Lyric video
- "I Say A Little Prayer" on YouTube

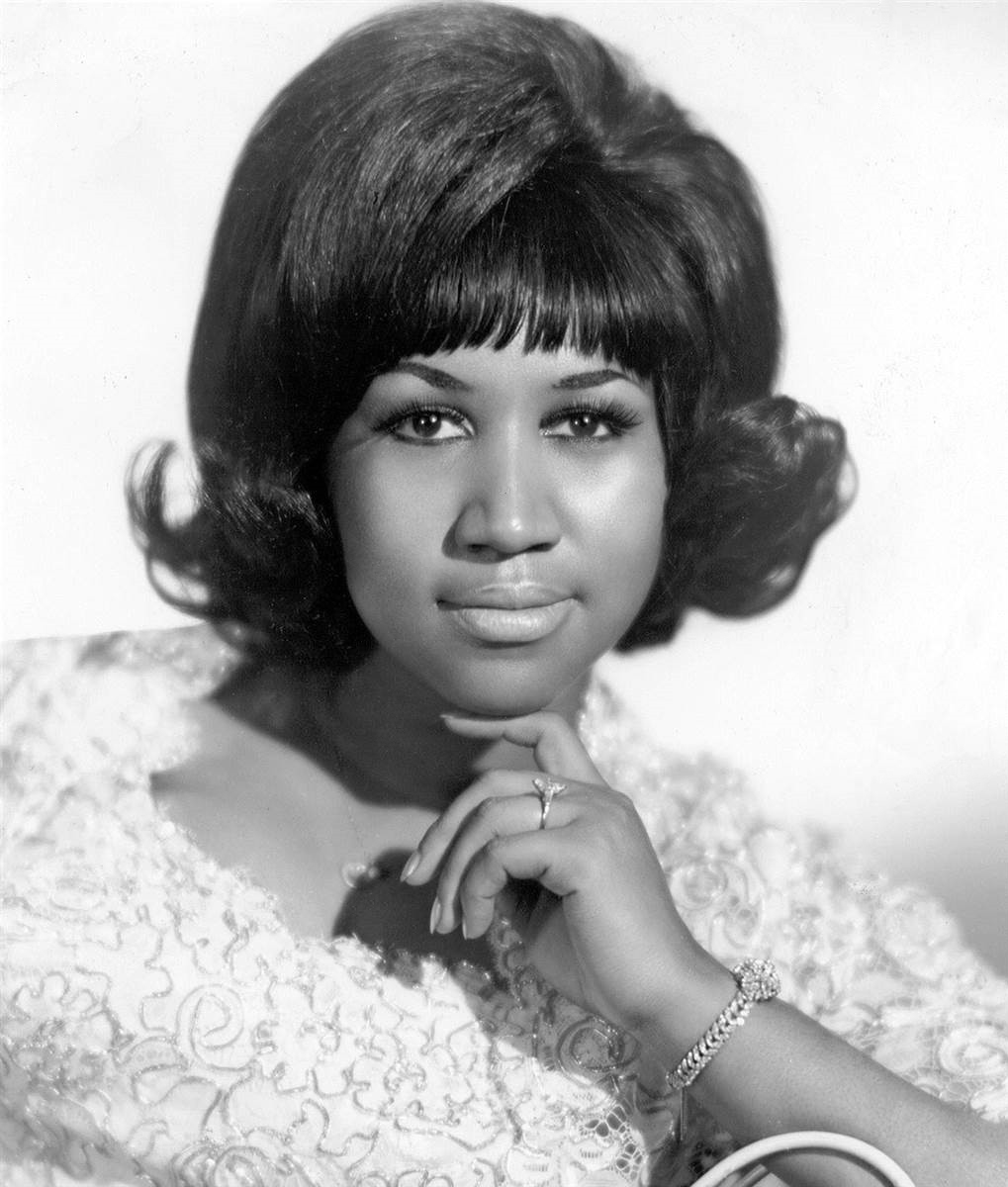
Aretha Franklin, 1968

"I Say a Little Prayer" also returned to the Pop & R&B Top Ten in the fall of 1968 via a recording by American singer Aretha Franklin taken from her 1968 album Aretha Now. Franklin and background vocalists The Sweet Inspirations were singing the song for fun while rehearsing the songs intended for the album when the viability of their recording "I Say a Little Prayer" became apparent, significantly reinvented from the format of the Dionne Warwick original via the prominence of Clayton Ivey's piano work. Similar to the history of Warwick's double-sided hit, the Aretha Franklin version was intended for the B-side of the July 1968 single release "The House That Jack Built" but began to accrue its own airplay that August.

In October 1968 "I Say a Little Prayer" reached number ten on the Hot 100 and number three on the R&B singles chart. The same month the single was certified Gold by the RIAA. "Prayer" became Franklin's ninth and last consecutive Hot 100 top 10 hit on the Atlantic label. Franklin's "Prayer" has a special significance in her UK career, as with its September 1968 No. 4 peak it became Franklin's biggest UK hit; subsequently Franklin surpassed that track's UK peak only with her No. 1 collaboration with George Michael, "I Knew You Were Waiting (For Me)".

In February 1987, UK music weekly New Musical Express published its critics' top 150 singles of all time, with Franklin's "I Say a Little Prayer" ranked at No. 1, followed by Al Green's "Tired of Being Alone" and Warwick's "Walk On By". (Franklin's "I Say a Little Prayer" did not appear in the magazine's in-house critics' top 100 singles poll conducted in November 2002.) In Australia, "I Say a Little Prayer" and "The House That Jack Built" were assigned a joint chart ranking that saw the double-A-side hit reach No. 10 in November 1968. "I Say a Little Prayer" also gave Franklin a European hit with chartings in France (No. 12), West Germany (No. 29) and the Netherlands (No. 4).

There are several harmonic differences between the Warwick and Franklin versions. Whilst the Warwick original was sung in G major, Franklin's transposes up a tone to A major. The chord under 'Say a little prayer for...' in the bridge is substantially different (F#m7, or v7 of III, in the original; D, or IV, in Franklin's version) and the third-inversion seventh in the bass under '...and ever...'in the chorus from the original (D major/C#) is a more conventional chord V (E major) in Franklin's arrangement.

In 2021, it was listed at No. 117 on Rolling Stone's "Top 500 Greatest Songs of All Time".

=== Charts ===
==== Weekly charts ====
Chart (1968)	Peak position
Australia (Kent Music Report)	8
Belgium (Ultratop 50 Wallonia)	7
Ireland (IRMA)	12
Netherlands (Dutch Top 40)	3
Netherlands (Single Top 100)	4
South Africa (Springbok Radio)	11
Sweden (Kvällstoppen)	4
UK Singles (Official Charts)	4
US Billboard Hot 100	10
US Hot Rhythm and Blues Singles (Billboard)	3
US Cash Box Top 100	18
West Germany (GfK)	29

Chart (2018)	Peak position
France (SNEP)	74
Netherlands (Single Top 100)	6
Sweden (Sverigetopplistan)	85
Switzerland (Schweizer Hitparade)	50
UK Singles (Official Charts)	51

==== Year-end charts ====
Chart (1968)	Rank
UK Singles (OCC)	41
US Billboard Hot 100	93

=== Certifications ===
Region	Certification	Certified units/sales
Denmark (IFPI Danmark)	Platinum	90,000^{‡}
Germany (BVMI)	Gold	250,000^{‡}
Italy (FIMI) sales since 2009	Platinum	70,000^{‡}
New Zealand (RMNZ)	2× Platinum	60,000^{‡}
Spain (Promusicae)	2× Platinum	120,000^{‡}
United Kingdom (BPI) sales since 2004	2× Platinum	1,200,000^{‡}
United States (RIAA)	Gold	1,000,000^{^}
^{^} Shipments figures based on certification alone.^{‡} Sales+streaming figures based on certification alone.

== Diana King version ==
"I Say a Little Prayer"

Single by Diana King

from the album Think Like a Girl
- Released: 1997
- Genre: Reggae
- Length: 3:34
- Label: Work Group
- Songwriters: Burt Bacharach; Hal David
- Producer: Andy Marvel

Diana King singles chronology
"Ain't Nobody" (1995)	"I Say a Little Prayer" (1997)	"L-L-Lies" (1997)

Music video
- "I Say a Little Prayer" on YouTube

In 1997, Jamaican singer Diana King released a reggae-style cover of "I Say a Little Prayer". It was produced by Andy Marvel and released by Work Group as the first single from her second album, Think Like a Girl (1997), and also featured prominently in the comedy My Best Friend's Wedding, starring Julia Roberts. The Love to Infinity dance remix popularized the song on radio. King's single reached No. 1 in Hungary, No. 6 in Australia, No. 12 in Norway and No. 17 in the UK.

=== Critical reception ===
Jose F. Promis from AllMusic called the song "excellent" and "driving". Larry Flick from Billboard magazine described it as an "instantly appealing interpretation", and stated that the song "takes on a saucy and aggressive tone – thanks to the kinetic chemistry between King and producer Andy Marvel, whose beat-smart arrangement gives the kids on the street a reason to pump up the volume." He also complimented British remixers Love to Infinity for doing "a fine job of refashioning the single into a frothy dance ditty, wrapping King's performance in shiny synths and lively beats." The Daily Vault wrote that the Aretha Franklin remake of "I Say a Little Prayer" "is, daresay, better than the original in some respects. King's please-get-lost vocals make for a solid background and power vocals." Pan-European magazine Music & Media named it "a '90s version of a '60s standard" and a "reggaefied take on the much covered Burt Bacharach/Hal David tune".

=== Charts ===
==== Weekly charts ====
Chart (1997)	Peak position
Australia (ARIA)	6
Europe (Eurochart Hot 100)	22
France (SNEP)	34
Germany (GfK)	73
Hungary (Mahasz)	1
Iceland (Íslenski Listinn Topp 40)	16
Ireland (IRMA)	27
Italy (Musica e dischi)	18
New Zealand (Recorded Music NZ)	21
Norway (VG-lista)	12
Scottish Singles Sales (Official Charts)	26
UK Singles (Official Charts)	17
UK Hip Hop/R&B (Official Charts)	2
US Billboard Hot 100	38
US Hot R&B/Hip-Hop Songs (Billboard)	68
US Dance Club Songs (Billboard)	8
US Dance Singles Sales (Billboard)	5
US Rhythmic Airplay (Billboard)	29

==== Year-end charts ====
Chart (1997)	Position
Australia (ARIA)	37
US Maxi-Singles Sales (Billboard)	24

=== Certifications ===
Region	Certification	Certified units/sales
Australia (ARIA)	Platinum	70,000^{^}
^{^} Shipments figures based on certification alone.

== Other recordings ==
=== Albums and singles ===
Warwick's "I Say a Little Prayer" did not appear on the Billboard Easy Listening chart, although two instrumental versions of the song were Easy Listening chart items in 1968: the first by Sérgio Mendes at No. 21 in the spring of 1968 while that fall Julius Wechter and the Baja Marimba Band took "I Say a Little Prayer" to No. 10.

The 1971 album Anne Murray / Glen Campbell features a medley of "I Say a Little Prayer" and "By the Time I Get to Phoenix"; the songs are sung in counterpoint to each other, with Murray vocalizing on "I Say a Little Prayer" while Campbell reprises his "By the Time I Get to Phoenix" hit. The track was a minor C&W hit at No. 40 and reached No. 81 on the Billboard Hot 100. The concept had previously been used on a 1968 single release by Big Dee Irwin and Mamie Galore. Warwick herself sang "I Say a Little Prayer" while Isaac Hayes sang "By the Time I Get to Phoenix" on their joint live album A Man and a Woman (1977).

A version by UK dance act Bomb the Bass (featuring Maureen) in 1988 peaked at No. 10 on the UK Singles Chart.

In 1999, Hungarian singer Zsuzsa Cserháti covered the song with the title (I Pray for You).

=== Film, TV, and musical soundtracks ===
In 1997, "I Say a Little Prayer" is one of several Bacharach/David songs featured prominently in the comedy My Best Friend's Wedding, which featured both a reggae-style cover by Diana King and a version sung by the film's cast. King's version was released as a single and brought the song back to the top 40 almost thirty years after Dionne Warwick's original, albeit with a No. 38 peak; King's single also reached No. 1 in Hungary, No. 34 in France, and No. 6 in Australia, where the film's soundtrack was a No. 1 album. Cassie Henderson, 14, sung this song for Soul Week on The X-Factor NZ Season 1 Episode 16. A parody of the song with altered lyrics was featured in the 2006 comedy film Date Movie making fun of its use in My Best Friend's Wedding.

It was covered and used in the television show Glee, in the episode "Showmance". It was performed by Dianna Agron as her character Quinn Fabray, with Naya Rivera and Heather Morris dancing backup as Santana Lopez and Brittany Pierce, as their audition song to join the glee club. Agron's "I Say a Little Prayer" charted on the UK Singles Chart at number 125.

- Karine Costa in 2002: a No. 16 hit in France that also charted on the Swiss charts at No. 82; this version was used in a television advertising campaign for French cooperative bank Crédit Mutuel.
- The BossHoss in 2006: a minor German hit (No. 79). In 2012, the group re-recorded this song as a collaboration with Ivy Quainoo, the first winner of The Voice of Germany.
- Tori Kelly and Pharrell Williams (as their characters Meena and Alfonso) covered this song for the 2021 animated film Sing 2.
- The Lianne La Havas version of the song was used in season 3, episode 13 of the television show This Is Us.

== See also ==
- "I Sign a Little Player or Two" (2006), a parody of both the song and José Mourinho, at the time manager of Chelsea F.C.
