= Alfie (Burt Bacharach song) =

1966 song by Burt Bacharach and Hal David

- Side A of UK single

Single by Cilla Black
- B-side: "Night Time Is Here"
- Released: 1966 (UK); August 1966 (US)
- Recorded: Autumn 1965
- Genre: Pop rock; beat; funk; blue-eyed soul; vocal jazz; easy listening
- Length: 2:40
- Label: Parlophone (UK); Capitol (U.S.)
- Songwriters: Burt Bacharach; Hal David
- Producer: George Martin

Cilla Black singles chronology
"Love's Just a Broken Heart" (1966)	"Alfie" (1966)	"Don't Answer Me" (1966)

Live video
- "Alfie" on YouTube

"Alfie" is a song written by Burt Bacharach and Hal David to promote the 1966 film Alfie. The song was a major hit for Cilla Black (UK) and Dionne Warwick (US).

At the 10th Annual Grammy Awards in 1968, Burt Bacharach won the Grammy for Best Instrumental Arrangement.

== Background ==
Although Bacharach has cited "Alfie" as his personal favorite of his compositions, he and Hal David were not eager to write a song to promote the film Alfie (a release from Paramount Pictures, which owned Famous Music) when approached by Ed Wolpin of the Composers' Guild. David thought the title character's name pedestrian: "Writing a song about a man called 'Alfie' didn't seem too exciting at the time."

The composers agreed to submit an "Alfie" song if they could complete it within three weeks. Bacharach, in California, was inspired by a rough cut of the film about the Cockney womanizer played by Michael Caine. Bacharach felt that: "with 'Alfie' the lyric had to come first because it had to say what that movie was all about". He arranged for David – on Long Island – to receive a script of the film to enable him to compose the lyrics. David utilized one of Caine's lines, "What's it all about?", as the opening phrase. David's lyrics were then set to music by Bacharach. The original was recorded in the key of F♯ major, but Bacharach would play it live in B♭ major, the same key in which Cilla Black recorded it.

== Cilla Black version ==
Although Bacharach and David suggested "Alfie" be recorded by Dionne Warwick, their most prolific interpreter, Paramount felt the film's setting demanded the song be recorded by a UK singer. Accordingly, Sandie Shaw, who had had a UK #1 hit with the Bacharach/David composition "(There's) Always Something There to Remind Me", was initially invited to record "Alfie". When Shaw declined, the song was offered to Cilla Black, who had also had a UK #1 with a Bacharach/David number, "Anyone Who Had a Heart".

Black was invited to record "Alfie" in a letter from Bacharach, and Black recalls him saying that the song had been written specially for her. Brian Epstein, her manager, was sent a demo of the song, originally performed by 22-year-old Kenny Karen, with Bacharach on piano, accompanied by a string ensemble. Black reacted negatively on hearing the demo "of some fella singing 'Alfie' ... I actually said to Brian 'I can't do this.' For a start—Alfie?? You call your dog Alfie! ... [Couldn't] it be Tarquin or something like that?"

Black states that, rather than declining outright to record the song, she decided to set conditions: "I said I'd only do it if Burt Bacharach himself did the arrangement, never thinking for one moment that he would. [When] the reply came back from America that he'd be happy to. ... I said I would only do it if Burt came over to London for the recording session. 'Yes,' came the reply. Next I said that as well as the arrangements and coming over, he had to play [piano] on the session. To my astonishment it was agreed that Burt would do all three. So by this time, coward that I was, I really couldn't back out."

The session for Black's recording of "Alfie" took place in the autumn of 1965, in Studio One at Abbey Road Studios, and was overseen by Black's regular producer George Martin. In addition to the agreed arranging and piano playing, Bacharach conducted a 48-piece orchestra, and the session also featured the Breakaways as background vocalists. According to Black, Bacharach had her record eighteen complete alternative takes before he was satisfied with her vocal, while Bacharach's estimation of the total number of takes, including partial ones, is as high as "twenty-eight or twenty-nine. ... I kept going [thinking] can we get it a little better ... [add] just some magic[?]. Cilla was great and wound up delivering a killer vocal as she did on so many of my songs."

"Alfie" was released in January 1966, four months prior to the opening of the film. The single was essentially intended as a specialty item to foster interest in the upcoming film rather than a mainstream hit. However the track accrued enough interest to enter the UK Top 50 in April 1966, reaching #9 that May. Black's "Alfie" was released in Australia, New Zealand and the US in July 1966, a month prior to the release of the film in both countries. Despite the soundtrack appearance of a version of "Alfie" by Cher in the film's worldwide release, Black's "Alfie" was a sizable Australian hit at #22. It went to #20 in New Zealand. In the US—where Black had previously enjoyed only one moderate success with "You're My World" in 1964—her "Alfie" single just made the Billboard Hot 100 at #95, the pop mainstream sector's focus being primarily on Cher's version of the song, which was only a moderate hit in the US at #32. In Canada her version reached #96 before being replaced by Cher's version. Interest in any one recorded version of "Alfie" was dissipated by the plethora of easy listening-oriented cover versions which were in release by the summer of 1966.

Cilla Black titled her 2004 autobiography What's It All About?, a reference to the opening phrase of the song. The grave marker beneath the headstone on her burial plot in Allerton Cemetery is inscribed with four lines taken from the bridge and the third verse of "Alfie". Lyrics from Black's hits "Step Inside Love" and "You're My World" also appear on the marker. The black marble headstone and marker were installed 18 April 2016, eight months after Black's death on 1 August 2015. Following the December 2015 theft of the original bronze nameplate, Black's grave remained unmarked until drier weather permitted the installation of the replacement marble headstone and marker.

== Cher version ==
"Alfie"
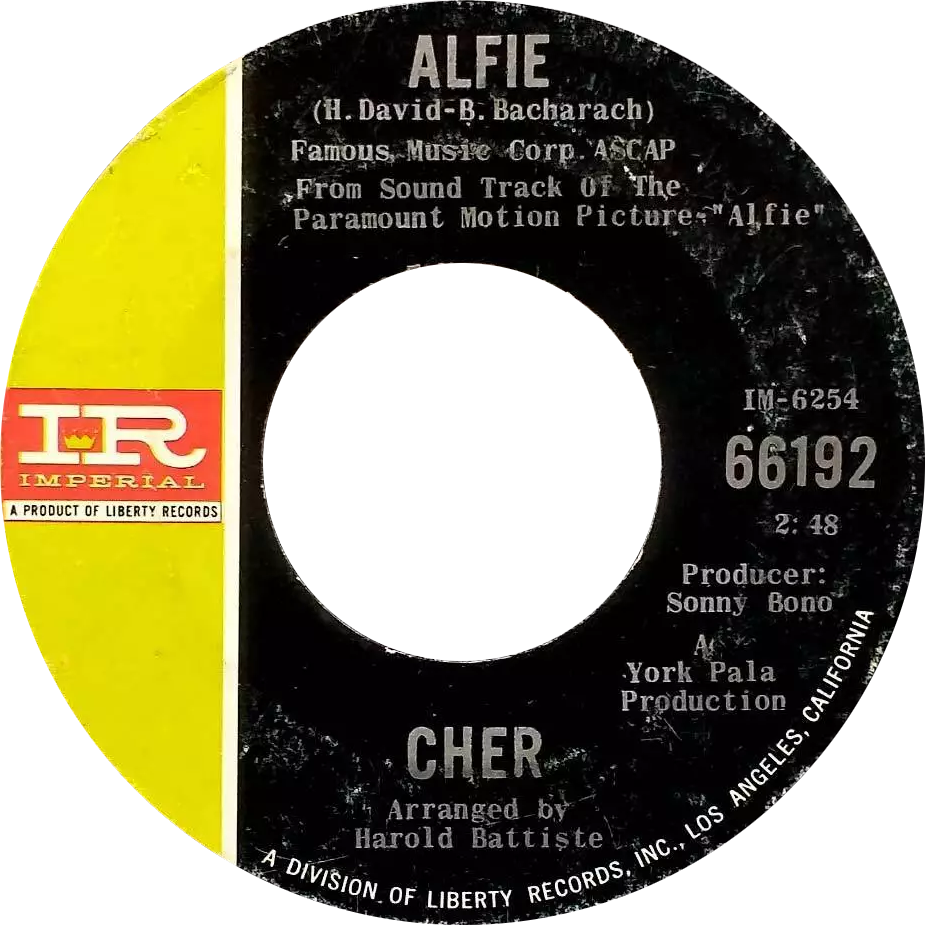
- One of pressings of the US single

Single by Cher

from the album Cher
- B-side: "She's No Better Than Me"
- Released: July 1966
- Genre: Pop; folk
- Length: 2:50
- Label: Imperial
- Songwriters: Burt Bacharach, Hal David
- Producer: Sonny Bono

Cher singles chronology
"Bang Bang (My Baby Shot Me Down)" (1966)	"Alfie" (1966)	"I Feel Something in the Air" (1966)

Audio video
- "Alfie" on YouTube

Although the song "Alfie" (as recorded by Black) had served as a promotional tool for the film's UK release, it did not serve as an official theme song, because director Lewis Gilbert felt the song would distract from the jazz score he had had Sonny Rollins provide for the film. United Artists compromised with Gilbert in keeping the song out of the main body of the film, instead having it play during the closing credits. The song was also not included on the soundtrack album of the film's UK release. However, the film's US distributor, United Artists, wanted the song featured on the US release of the soundtrack album.

Rather than utilize Black's version, United Artists commissioned a new version of the song "Alfie" by the 20-year-old American singer/actress Cher, who was on the roster of Imperial Records. Cher recorded the song at Gold Star Studios, in a rendition produced by her then-husband Sonny Bono, which followed a similar production style to that of Phil Spector. Cher's version of "Alfie" was released at the end of June 1966, almost two months prior to the film's US premiere (August 25, 1966). Despite being the follow-up to her #2 hit "Bang Bang (My Baby Shot Me Down)", "Alfie" rose no higher than #32. It was also a top 40 hit in Canada, reaching #36.

The versions of "Alfie" by both Cilla Black and Cher were released in Australia in July 1966, with Black's becoming the major hit at #22; the Cher version's Australian chart peak was #96.

"Alfie" was included in Cher's album Chér, released in October 1966.

Billboard wrote that Cher delivered a "commercial, dramatic reading" of "Alfie". Cash Box wrote that Cher "should certainly have the lion's share of the 'Alfie' sales-pie with this blue-ribbon reading of the popular flick theme", also noting her "inventive [and] feelingful style".

Cher re-recorded the song for the closing credits of the 2004 remake of Alfie, but it was dropped in favour of a version by Joss Stone.

=== Charts ===
1966 weekly chart performance for "Alfie" by Cher
Chart (1966)	Peak position
Canada Top Singles (RPM)	36
Quebec (ADISQ)	16
US Billboard Hot 100	32
US Cash Box Top 100	32

== Early covers ==
Despite the relative failure of the version of "Alfie" cut for the US film release, Cilla Black's UK success with the song had attracted sufficient attention in the US for several American singers besides Cher to cover the song by the time the film Alfie opened in the US in August 1966. Two of these covers actually predate the Cher recording although neither was released prior to Cher's, the first evident recording of "Alfie" by an American singer being that cut by Jerry Butler in May 1966 which first appeared as a track on the December 1967 album release Mr Dream Merchant. Also in the spring of 1966 Dee Dee Warwick, while on a promotional junket to the UK, made a recording of "Alfie" at the Philips Studio in Marble Arch with Johnny Franz producing the session and Peter Knight arranging and conducting the orchestra; this version was first issued over a year later as the B-side of Dee Dee Warwick's 1967 single "Locked in Your Love".

At the time the film Alfie premiered in New York City August 25, 1966 at least eight recorded versions of the song "Alfie" were in release in the US: besides the Cher version from the film and the Cilla Black original which had been issued in the US that July to peak at No.95 on the Billboard Hot 100, "Alfie" had been recorded by Vikki Carr, Jack Jones, Tony Martin, Carmen McRae, Joanie Sommers and Billy Vaughn. The five last-named singers had recorded "Alfie" in hopes of taking the song into the Billboard Easy Listening chart rather than scoring a mainstream Pop hit and both Joanie Sommers and Carmen McRae did score an Easy Listening hit with their respective versions of "Alfie" (Sommers - #9; McRae - #29).

== Dionne Warwick version ==
"Alfie"
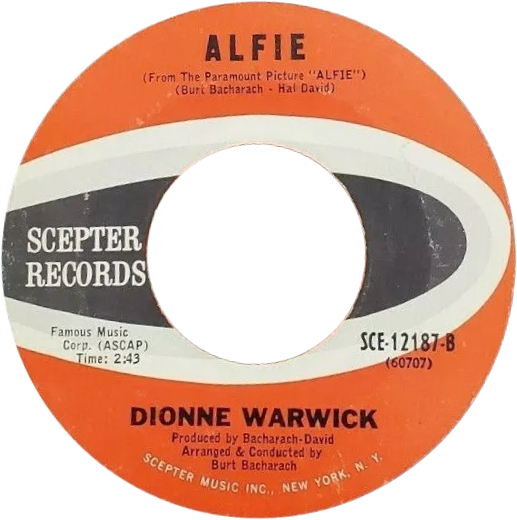
- Side B of the US single

Single by Dionne Warwick

from the album Here Where There Is Love
- A-side: "The Beginning of Loneliness"
- Released: March 1967
- Recorded: 1966
- Genre: Soul; pop
- Length: 2:44
- Label: Scepter
- Songwriters: Burt Bacharach; Hal David
- Producers: Burt Bacharach; Hal David

Dionne Warwick singles chronology
"Another Night" (1966)	"The Beginning of Loneliness" / "Alfie" (1967)	"The Windows of the World" (1967)

Audio video
- "Alfie" on YouTube

"Alfie" would not become a Top 15 hit in the US until the spring and summer of 1967 when Dionne Warwick, the most prolific interpreter of Bacharach/David compositions and the composers' original choice, recorded the song. Warwick's version peaked to #15 on the Billboard Hot 100, #5 on the Billboard R&B Singles Chart and #10 on the Canadian Singles Chart. Introduced on the December 1966 album release Here Where There Is Love, Warwick's version of "Alfie" had been an impromptu addition to a recording session at A&R Studio in New York City whose scheduled tracks had been completed early; Scepter Records A&R man Steve Tyrell suggested to Burt Bacharach that the booked time remaining be put to use by having Warwick record a version of "Alfie". Warwick, though feeling it pointless to increase the song's massive cover version count (there were by then some forty-two recorded versions of the song), was persuaded to record the song, cutting her vocal in a single take.

Although the "Alfie" track on Warwick's Here Where There Is Love album began receiving radio airplay as early as January 1967, the track was not issued as a single until March 1967 and then as the intended B-side of the Bacharach/David composed "The Beginning of Loneliness"; however disc jockeys preferred "Alfie", flipped the single to its B-side, and the track began to ascend the Billboard Hot 100 in April 1967, with a major assist from Warwick's performance of "Alfie" on the 39th Academy Awards ceremony television broadcast live worldwide on April 10, 1967.

Following the song's chart success, "Alfie" was later released with a B-side track titled "Window Wishing". Billboard's year end tally of the biggest Pop hits of 1967 ranked Warwick's version of "Alfie" at #44 in a Top 100 of the year composed otherwise of Top Ten hits.

In 2008, Warwick's recording of "Alfie" was inducted into the Grammy Hall of Fame.

=== Track listing and formats ===
- US 7" Vinyl

A. "The Beginning of Loneliness" – 3:10
B. "Alfie" – 2:43

- US 7" Vinyl

A. "Alfie" – 2:43
B. "Window Wishing" – 2:31

=== Charts ===
Chart (1967)	Peak position
Canada Top Singles (RPM)	10
US Billboard Hot 100	15
US Hot Rhythm & Blues Singles (Billboard)	5
US Cash Box Top 100	15

== Other versions ==
In 1966, Dutch singer Conny Vandenbos recorded a Dutch-language version titled "Frankie" for her album Conny Van den Bos.

In 1968, Stevie Wonder released a harmonica instrumental version. This version made the Hot 100, peaking at #66, and it was also a Top 20 Easy Listening hit. Wonder's single was made for Gordy Records and released pseudonymously as Eivets Rednow - an inversion of "Stevie" and "Wonder". In Canada the song reached #83.

Mina recorded the song in 1971 for her album Mina, also known as "the monkey album".

The Delfonics recorded "Alfie" for their 1968 La La Means I Love You album produced by Thom Bell; originally the B-side of the group's hit 1968 hit "Break Your Promise", the Delfonics' recording of "Alfie" had a belated A-side release in 1973 when it was a minor R&B hit (#88).

In 1994, Whitney Houston performed the song on select dates during her Bodyguard Tour, and her 1997 HBO televised concert, Classic Whitney: Live from Washington, D.C..

Other artists to record versions of "Alfie" include several versions by Bacharach himself, Patricia Barber, Tony Bennett, Jerry Butler, Liane Carroll, Randy Crawford, Blossom Dearie, Bill Evans, Percy Faith, Everything But The Girl, Maynard Ferguson, Renée Geyer, Stan Getz, Tony Hatch, Dick Hyman, Jack Jones, The Anita Kerr Singers, Chaka Khan, Rahsaan Roland Kirk, Earl Klugh, Cleo Laine, Tony Martin, Johnny Mathis, David McCallum, Carmen McRae, Brad Mehldau, Pat Metheny, Matt Monro, Elaine Paige, Rita Reys, Buddy Rich, Rumer, The John Scofield Trio, The Sweet Inspirations, Joanie Sommers, McCoy Tyner, Midge Ure, Sylvia Vrethammar (Swedish rendering), Sarah Vaughan, Billy Vaughn, Nancy Wilson, Andy Williams, Roger Williams, Vanessa Williams, Kerry Ellis, Alison Moyet, Connie Francis, Vikki Carr, Peter Nero, Ed Ames and Nanette Workman.

Barbra Streisand recorded the song for her 1969 album What About Today? and performed it on her Timeless Tour in 2000.

In a deleted scene from the movie Austin Powers in Goldmember, the song is parodied, with "Austin" replacing "Alfie" in the lyric. Alfie is sung by most of the main characters. Michael Caine, who plays Austin Powers' father, also played the character Alfie in the original 1966 movie, and scenes from the film appear in the background while he is singing. Susanna Hoffs made the recording of this version - entitled "Alfie (What's It All About, Austin?)" for the soundtrack album.

Bob Welch covered this song on his 2011 Album: Sings The Best Songs Ever Written

Olivia Newton-John recorded the song for her 2004 album Indigo: Women of Song

Santana Lopez (portrayed by Naya Rivera) performed this song on the sixth episode of Glee's sixth season, "What The World Needs Now". The episode aired in the US on 6 February 2015.

In 2020, emerging Japanese pop star Fujii Kaze covered this song on the special edition of his debut album, Help Ever Hurt Never.

On December 3, 2023, Cynthia Erivo sang the song to honor Dionne Warwick at the Kennedy Center Honors.
