= You'll Never Get to Heaven (If You Break My Heart) =

1964 single by Dionne Warwick

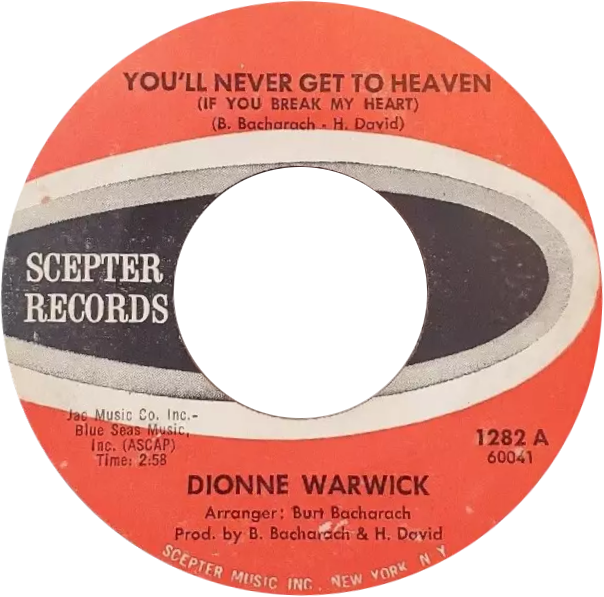
- Side A of the US single

Single by Dionne Warwick

from the album Make Way for Dionne Warwick
- B-side: "A House is Not a Home"
- Released: August 1964
- Genre: Soul, pop
- Length: 2:58
- Label: Scepter 1282
- Songwriters: Burt Bacharach; Hal David
- Producers: Burt Bacharach; Hal David

Dionne Warwick singles chronology
"Walk On By" (1964)	"You'll Never Get to Heaven (If You Break My Heart)" (1964)	"Reach Out for Me" (1964)

Music video
- You'll Never Get to Heaven (If You Break My Heart) on YouTube

"You'll Never Get to Heaven (If You Break My Heart)" is a song composed by Burt Bacharach, with lyrics by Hal David. It was originally recorded by Dionne Warwick in 1964, who charted at number 34 in the US Billboard Hot 100 with her version. It was covered by the Stylistics in 1973, who reached number 23 in the US with their cover.

== Dionne Warwick version ==
Dionne Warwick recorded "You'll Never Get to Heaven (If You Break My Heart)" in 1964, and released it as the second single release from her third studio album. The song was an international hit, reaching number 34 on the US Billboard Hot 100 and number 28 on the Cash Box Top 100. It did better elsewhere, peaking at number 20 in the UK and at number 15 in Canada. The B-side, "A House Is Not a Home", was also a chart hit, reaching number 71 on Billboard, number 50 on Cash Box and number 37 in Canada.

=== Weekly charts ===
Chart (1964)	Peak position
Australia	32
Canada Top Singles (RPM)	15
UK Singles	20
US Billboard Hot 100	34
US Billboard Hot R&B	10
US Cash Box Top 100	28

== The Stylistics version ==
"You'll Never Get to Heaven (If You Break My Heart)"
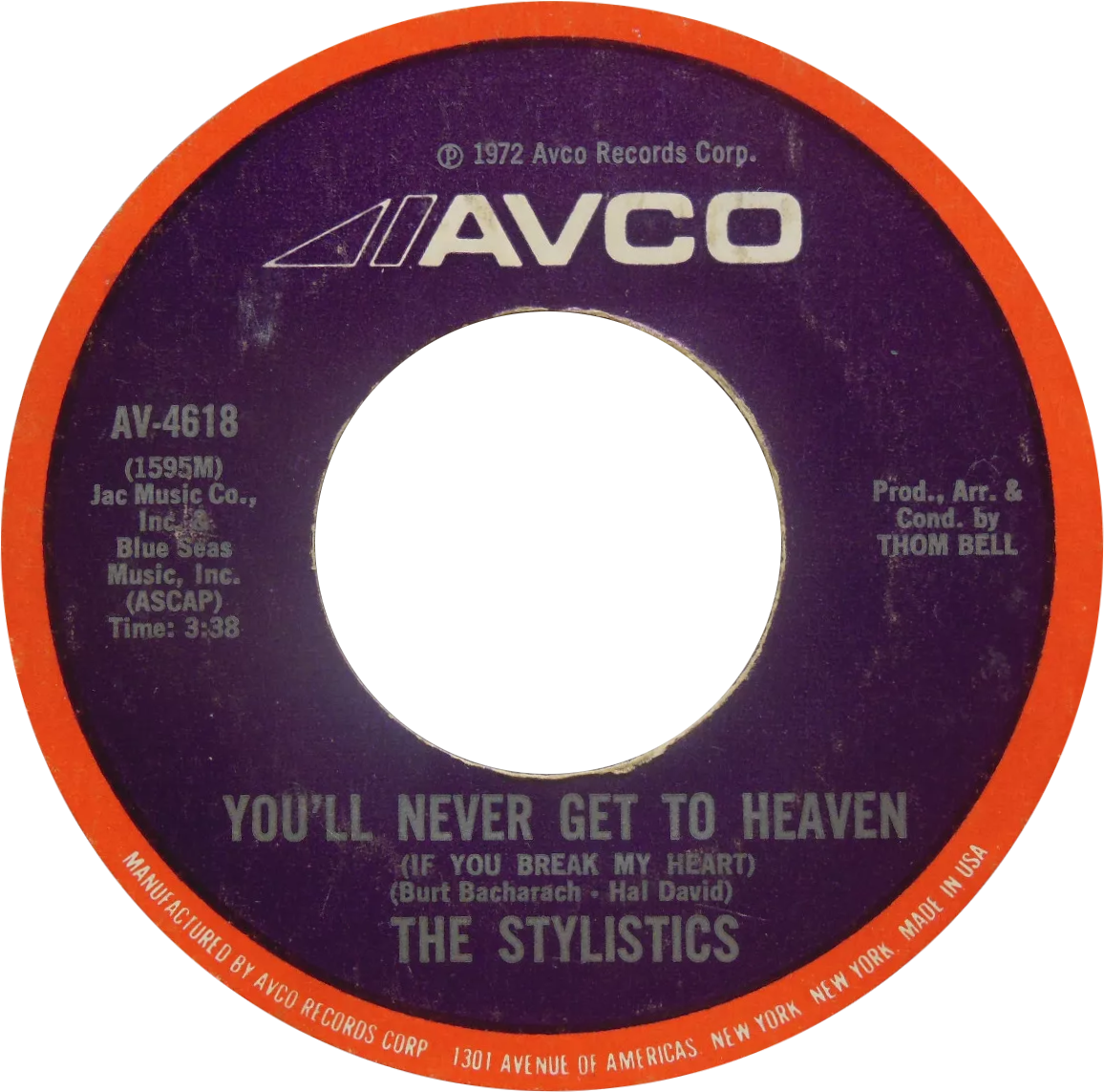
- One of side-A labels of the US single

Single by The Stylistics

from the album Round 2
- B-side: "If You Don't Watch Out"
- Released: May 1973
- Genre: Soul, pop
- Length: 3:38
- Label: Avco 4618
- Songwriters: Burt Bacharach; Hal David
- Producer: Thom Bell

The Stylistics singles chronology
"Break Up to Make Up" (1973)	"You'll Never Get to Heaven (If You Break My Heart)" (1973)	"Rockin' Roll Baby" (1973)

Music video
- The Stylistics - You'll Never Get to Heaven (If You Break My Heart) [Official Lyric Video] on YouTube

The Stylistics covered the song "You'll Never Get to Heaven (If You Break My Heart)" in 1973. It was the third and final single from their second album. Their version was yet more successful in the US, peaking at number 23 on Billboard and number 16 on Cash Box. It was also an Adult Contemporary hit, reaching number four.

=== Chart performance ===
Chart (1973)	Peak position
Australia	83
Canada RPM Top Singles	35
Canada RPM Adult Contemporary	38
US Billboard Hot 100	23
US Billboard Adult Contemporary	4
US Billboard R&B	8
US Cash Box Top 100	16

==== Extended play version ====
Chart (1976)	Peak position
UK	24

== Other versions ==
- Cilla Black recorded and released the song in 1969.
- Rahsaan Roland Kirk released an instrumental version on his "Bright Moments" (1973) album.
- A cover version by Daniel Johnston is included on 1983's "More Songs of Pain".
