= Reach Out for Me =

Song composed by Burt Bacharach performed by Dionne Warwick

"Reach Out for Me" is a 1963 a song written by Burt Bacharach and Hal David and originally recorded by Lou Johnson. In the US, the original version peaked at number seventy-four on the Billboard Hot 100 the week ending December 7, 1963.

== Dionne Warwick recording ==
"Reach Out for Me"

Single by Dionne Warwick

from the album Make Way for Dionne Warwick
- B-side: "How Many Days of Sadness"
- Released: October 1, 1964
- Recorded: 1964
- Studio: Bell Sound, New York City
- Genre: Pop; R&B; soul
- Length: 2:52
- Label: Scepter
- Composer: Burt Bacharach
- Lyricist: Hal David
- Producers: Burt Bacharach; Hal David

Dionne Warwick singles chronology
"You'll Never Get to Heaven (If You Break My Heart)" (1964)	"Reach Out for Me" (1964)	"Who Can I Turn To" (1965)

In 1964, it was recorded as a track from the album Make Way for Dionne Warwick. Released as a single, it was a number twenty hit on the Billboard Hot 100 and went to number one on the Cash Box R&B chart.

== Other versions ==
- The song was also covered by British singer Michael Ball on his album Back To Bacharach.
- Olivia Newton-John recorded a version for her 1989 album Warm and Tender.
- The song is also a Northern Soul classic by Roy Hamilton.

=== Charts ===
==== Dionne Warwick version ====
Chart (1964)	Peak position
Australian (Kent Music Report)	43
Canada Top Singles (RPM)	12
Quebec (ADISQ)	24
UK Singles (Official Charts)	23
US Billboard Hot 100	20
US Hot R&B/Hip-Hop Songs (Billboard)	1

==== Olivia Newton-John version ====
Chart (1989-1990)	Peak position
Australian (Kent Music Report)	153
Quebec (ADISQ)	47
US Adult Contemporary (Billboard)	32
