= Now (Dionne Warwick album) =

Studio album by Dionne Warwick
- Released: November 6, 2012
- Length: 46:15
- Label: H&I
- Producer: Phil Ramone

Dionne Warwick chronology
Only Trust Your Heart (2011)	Now (2012)	Feels So Good (2014)

Now (sometimes also Now: A Celebratory 50th Anniversary Album) is a studio album by American singer Dionne Warwick. It was released by H&I Music Productions on November 6, 2012 in the United States. Released to mark Warwick's 50th anniversary as a recording artist, the album is a retrospective collection of new recordings of her Burt Bacharach and Hal David classics as well as four new tracks. Now peaked at number 57 on the UK Albums Chart and received a Grammy Award nomination in the Best Traditional Pop Vocal Album category in 2014.

== Critical reception ==
Professional ratings
Review scores
Source	Rating
Allmusic	3/5 stars

Allmusic editor Mark Deming wrote that "the album is lushly produced by Phil Ramone, with arrangements that suggest smooth jazz rather than the adult but AM-friendly pop of Warwick's heyday, and the accompaniment, expert as it may be, tends to buff down the emotional edges that made these songs so satisfying, and blunting their melodic ingenuity. The new songs are serviceable, but they don't match the high standard of the classics featured elsewhere on the album; however, Warwick is at her best on the fresher material, where she shows she's still a song stylist of considerable talent and keen instincts."

== Track listing ==
All tracks produced by Phil Ramone. All tracks written by Burt Bacharach and Hal David, except where noted.

No.	Title	Writer(s)	Length
1.	"(There's) Always Something There to Remind Me"		3:22
2.	"Are You There (with Another Girl)"		3:12
3.	"Don't Make Me Over"		3:44
4.	"Love Is Still the Answer"	Bacharach; Tonio K.	4:00
5.	"99 Miles from L.A."	Albert Hammond; David	3:58
6.	"Be Aware"		4:17
7.	"Reach Out"		3:01
8.	"Is There Anybody Out There?"	Bacharach; James Ingram; John Bettis; Puff Johnson	4:22
9.	"I Just Have to Breathe"		3:57
10.	"It Was Almost Like a Song"	Archie Jordan; David	3:40
11.	"Make It Easy on Yourself"		4:19
12.	"I Say a Little Prayer" (duet with her son David Elliott)		4:23

== Charts ==
Chart (2012)	Peak position
Scottish Albums (OCC)	69
UK Albums (OCC)	57
UK Independent Albums (OCC)	7

== Release history ==
Region	Date	Format	Label	Ref.
Various	November 6, 2012	CD; digital download	H&I Music Productions	
