= Make Way for Dionne Warwick =

Studio album by Dionne Warwick
- Released: August 31, 1964
- Recorded: Bell Sound (New York City)
- Length: 34:45
- Label: Scepter
- Producer: Burt Bacharach; Hal David

Dionne Warwick chronology
Anyone Who Had a Heart (1964)	Make Way for Dionne Warwick (1964)	The Sensitive Sound of Dionne Warwick (1965)

Singles from Make Way for Dionne Warwick
- 1. "Walk On By" Released: April 26, 1964; 2. "You'll Never Get to Heaven (If You Break My Heart)" Released: August 1964; 3. "Reach Out for Me" Released: October 1964

Make Way for Dionne Warwick is the third studio album by American singer Dionne Warwick. It was released by Scepter Records on August 31, 1964, in the United States. Propelled by the hit singles "Walk On By", "You'll Never Get to Heaven", and "Wishin' and Hopin'", it became Warwick's first album to enter the US charts, reaching the top ten of Hot R&B LP's.

== Background ==
Make Way for Dionne Warwick is notable for including the singles "Walk On By", Warwick's second top ten hit on the US Billboard Hot 100. Also featured are "You'll Never Get to Heaven (If You Break My Heart)", "A House Is Not a Home", "Reach Out for Me", and one of the first recordings of "(They Long to Be) Close to You." "Get Rid of Him" is actually a 1962 track by the Shirelles, with Warwick's vocal replacing that of Shirley Alston. The album was digitally remastered and reissued on CD on November 29, 2011, by Collectables Records.

== Critical reception ==
Professional ratings
Review scores
Source	Rating
AllMusic	3/5 stars

AllMusic editor Lindsay Planer gave the album three stars out of five. He remarked that while "Wishin' and Hopin'" and "I Smiled Yesterday" had "also been included on Warwick's debut album, Presenting Dionne Warwick. However, that didn't seem to deter listeners eager for new tunes. Warwick's musical mentors and collaborators Burt Bacharach and Hal David also presented the singer with several additional compositions that would become signature songs for other performers in the ensuing years."

== Track listing ==
All tracks are written by Burt Bacharach and Hal David, except where noted.

Side one
No.	Title	Writer(s)	Length
1.	"A House Is Not a Home"		3:00
2.	"People"	Jule Styne; Bob Merrill	3:22
3.	"They Long to Be Close to You"		2:23
4.	"The Last One to Be Loved"		3:20
5.	"Land of Make Believe"		3:03
6.	"Reach Out for Me"		2:52

Side two
No.	Title	Writer(s)	Length
7.	"You'll Never Get to Heaven (If You Break My Heart)"		3:10
8.	"Walk On By"		2:58
9.	"Wishin' and Hopin'"		2:55
10.	"I Smiled Yesterday"		2:43
11.	"Get Rid of Him"	Helen Miller; Howard Greenfield	2:34
12.	"Make the Night a Little Longer"	Gerry Goffin; Carole King	2:31

== Charts ==
Chart performance for Make Way for Dionne Warwick
Chart (1964–1965)	Peak position
US Top LP's (Billboard)	68
US Hot R&B LP's (Billboard)	10
US Top 100 Albums (Cash Box)	31
US Top 100 LP's (Record World)	23
