= Anyone Who Had a Heart =

Anyone Who Had a Heart may refer to:

- "Anyone Who Had a Heart" (song), a song by Burt Bacharach and Hal David
- Anyone Who Had a Heart (Dionne Warwick album), 1964
- Anyone Who Had a Heart (Joe Chindamo album), 1997
