= 99 Miles from L.A. =

Single by Albert Hammond

from the album 99 Miles from L.A.
- B-side: "Rivers Are for Boats"
- Released: April 1975
- Genre: Soft rock
- Length: 2:58
- Label: Epic
- Songwriter(s): Albert Hammond, Hal David

Albert Hammond singles chronology
"We're Running Out" (1975)	"99 Miles from L.A." (1975)	"Lay the Music Down" (1975)

"99 Miles from L.A." is a 1975 single written by Albert Hammond and Hal David and performed by Hammond. The song was Hammond's only number one on the Easy Listening chart as well as his most successful release on the chart. "99 Miles from L.A." spent one week at number one and peaked at number ninety-one on the Billboard Hot 100.

A new version of this song was included as a track on Hammond's 1976 album, When I Need You.

== Cover versions ==
- The song was included as a track on Art Garfunkel's 1975 album, Breakaway.
- Johnny Mathis covered the song live on his 1975 album Feelings.
- In 1990, Julio Iglesias covered the song for his album Starry Night.
- Dionne Warwick covered the song on her 2012 50th anniversary album Now.
- Nancy Sinatra covered the song on her 2002 album California Girl.
- Stevie Holland covered the song on her 2015 album Life Goes On.
- Claire Small covered the song on the 2012 album Even More Songs of Route 66: From Here to There.

== In popular culture ==
- The song provides the title of the first novel by filmmaker/author P. David Ebersole, published by Pelekinesis in 2022.

== See also ==
- List of number-one adult contemporary singles of 1975 (U.S.)
