= My Favorite Time of the Year =

Studio album by Dionne Warwick
- Released: October 26, 2004
- Recorded: June 21-30, 2004
- Studio: Firehouse Studios (Pasadena, California)
- Genre: Funk; Pop; Soul
- Length: 51:08
- Label: DMI
- Producer: Tena Rix Clark

Dionne Warwick chronology
| Dionne Sings Dionne, Vol. 2 (2000) | My Favorite Time of the Year (2004) | My Friends & Me (2006) |

My Favorite Time of the Year is a studio album by American singer Dionne Warwick. It was released by DMI Records on October 26, 2004 in the United States. Produced by Tena Rix Clark, it is Warwick's first Christmas album and her only record to be solely released by DMI. My Favorite Time of the Year consists of thirteen tracks, featuring one original song penned and recorded with Bebe Winans and twelve cover versions of Christmas standards and carols, one of which is a duet with Gladys Knight. The album debuted and peaked at number 49 on the US Top Holiday Albums.

== Critical reception ==
Professional ratings
Review scores
| Source | Rating |
|---|---|
| Allmusic | 3.5/5 stars |
| Robert Christgau | (neither) |

Allmusic editor Rob Theakston wrote that Warwick's "velvety smooth voice glazes through each track quite seamlessly. The contemporary over polished production and the inclusion of smooth jazz icon Dave Koz might be a detraction to some listeners, but there's a beautiful duet with longtime friend Gladys Knight [...] Much like her non-holiday fare, this is a charming and warm affair from start to finish a level of quality you'd come to expect from Warwick. While it's definitely been worth the wait, here's hoping a follow-up is shortly in order." Robert Christgau wrote about the album: "If new Christmas product you must have, these oldies definitely outshine newies from Darlene Love (eh) and Taylor Swift (ugh)."

== Track listing ==
All tracks produced by Tena Rix Clark.

My Favorite Time of the Year track listing
| No. | Title | Writer(s) | Length |
|---|---|---|---|
| 1. | "The Christmas Song (Chestnuts Roasting on an Open Fire)" | Robert Wells; Mel Tormé | 4:11 |
| 2. | "White Christmas" | Irving Berlin | 3:56 |
| 3. | "Silent Night" | Franz Xaver Gruber; Joseph Mohr | 4:59 |
| 4. | "Joy to the World" | Isaac Watts | 4:35 |
| 5. | "It's the Most Wonderful Time of the Year" | Edward Pola; George Wyle | 3:37 |
| 6. | "I Believe in Christmas" (duet with BeBe Winans) | Winans; Tom Hemby | 4:00 |
| 7. | "My Favorite Things" | Richard Rodgers; Oscar Hammerstein II | 3:06 |
| 8. | "Silver Bells" | Jay Livingston; Ray Evans | 4:13 |
| 9. | "O Come, All Ye Faithful" | Traditional | 4:58 |
| 10. | "Winter Wonderland" | Felix Bernard; Richard Bernhard Smith | 3:10 |
| 11. | "I'll Be Home for Christmas" | Kim Gannon; Walter Kent | 3:32 |
| 12. | "Have Yourself a Merry Little Christmas" (duet with Gladys Knight) | Hugh Martin; Ralph Blane | 4:44 |
| 13. | "Happy Holiday" | Berlin | 2:16 |
| Total length: | | | 51:08 |

== Personnel ==
- Dionne Warwick – vocals
- Tim Heintz – acoustic piano, keyboards, music and string arrangements
- Tim Pierce – guitars
- John Peña – bass
- Ricky Lawson – drums
- Paulinho da Costa – percussion
- Dave Koz – saxophone (2, 4, 10)
- Joseph Alfuso – string orchestration and conductor
- Alex Brown – backing vocals
- Bridgette Bryant-Blades – backing vocals
- Dee Harvey – backing vocals
- BeBe Winans – vocals (6)
- Gladys Knight – vocals (12)
- Carmen Twillie – vocal arrangements (4, 7), all other vocal arrangements
- Tena Clark – all other vocal arrangements

=== Technical ===
- Gabriel Moffat – recording
- Ed Wooley – second engineer
- Milton Gutierrez Ruezga – assistant engineer
- Don Murray – mixing
- Robert Vosgien – mastering at Capitol Mastering (Hollywood, California)

Production and design credits

- Brad Rivers – production manager
- William Ford – art direction
- Peleg Top – art direction, package design
- Harry Langdon – photography
- Ethan Crimmins – managing director, special products
- Jalila Larsuel – public relations
- Ken Batchelor – vice president, marketing

== Charts ==
Weekly chart performance for My Favorite Time of the Year
| Chart (2004) | Peak position |
|---|---|
| US Top Holiday Albums (Billboard) | 49 |

== Release history ==
My Favorite Time of the Year release history
| Region | Date | Format | Label | Ref. |
|---|---|---|---|---|
| Various | October 26, 2004 | CD; digital download | DMI | |
