= Warm and Tender (disambiguation) =

Warm and Tender is a 1989 album by Olivia Newton-John.

Warm and Tender may also refer to:

- Warm and Tender, US title of The Song of My Life, an album by Petula Clark
- Warm and Tender, an album by Charlie Watts
