= A House Is Not a Home (song) =

1964 song by Burt Bacharach

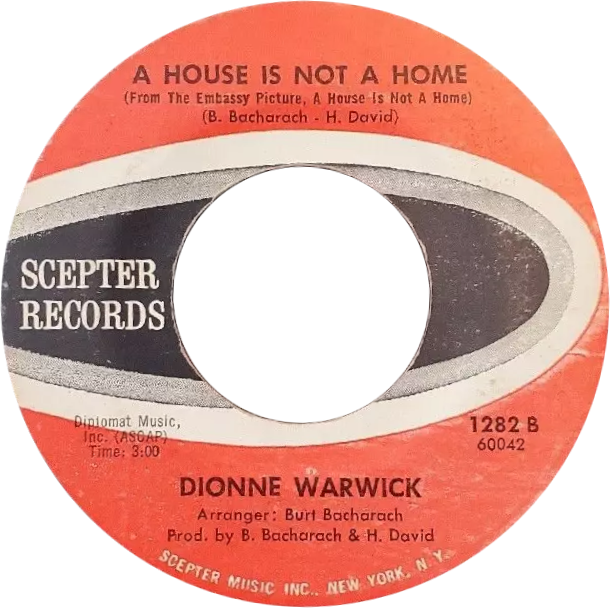
- Side B of the US single

Song by Dionne Warwick

from the album Make Way for Dionne Warwick
- A-side: "You'll Never Get to Heaven (If You Break My Heart)"
- Released: 1964
- Recorded: 1964
- Studio: Bell Sound (New York City)
- Genre: Soul
- Length: 3:08
- Label: Scepter
- Songwriters: Burt Bacharach, Hal David
- Producers: Burt Bacharach, Hal David

"A House Is Not a Home" is a 1964 ballad written by the team of Burt Bacharach and Hal David for the 1964 film of the same name, starring Shelley Winters and Robert Taylor. The song was recorded by American singer Dionne Warwick at Bell Sound Studios in New York City, and was a modest hit in the United States for the singer, peaking at #71 on the pop singles chart as the B-side of the top 40 single, "You'll Never Get to Heaven (If You Break My Heart)". Another version of the song, by Brook Benton, which was the version that appeared in the film, was released at nearly the same time. It debuted two weeks earlier on the Billboard Hot 100. Benton's version split airplay with Warwick's, and ultimately peaked at #75.

Warwick's version of "A House Is Not a Home" fared better in Canada, where it was a top 40 hit, peaking at #37. The ballad made the R&B top 10 in Cashbox by both Warwick and Benton, with neither artist specified as best seller.

Despite its modest initial success, the song went on to achieve greater renown through frequent recordings by other artists, including a hit version in 1981 by Luther Vandross.

== Production ==
The Warwick single was performed in the key of F major, and it is most often played in that key in jazz interpretations. Bacharach recorded and performs the song in the key of A-flat major.

== Luther Vandross version ==
"A House Is Not a Home"

Single by Luther Vandross

from the album Never Too Much
- Released: 1981
- Genre: Quiet storm; R&B; soul
- Length: 7:07
- Label: Epic
- Songwriters: Burt Bacharach, Hal David
- Producer: Luther Vandross

The song was recorded by R&B/soul singer-songwriter Luther Vandross on his 1981 debut album Never Too Much. The track, which was recorded at seven minutes long, became one of Vandross's signature songs. His performance of the song at the 1988 NAACP Awards telecast brought Warwick to tears.

In 2009, Essence magazine included Vandross's version of the song in their list of the "25 Best Slow Jams of All Time".

Vandross's version was sampled by Kanye West for "Slow Jamz", from Twista's 2004 album Kamikaze, as well as Kanye's own 2004 studio album The College Dropout.

=== Personnel ===
- Luther Vandross – vocals, song arrangement, rhythm arrangement
- Leon Pendarvis – string and horn arrangements
- Buddy Williams – drums
- Anthony Jackson – bass
- Nathaniel Adderley Jr. – keyboards
- Georg Wadenius – guitar
- Crusher Bennett – percussion

=== Certifications ===
Region	Certification	Certified units/sales
United States (RIAA)	Gold	500,000^{‡}
^{‡} Sales+streaming figures based on certification alone.

== Other notable versions ==
- Following the original singles by Warwick and Benton, Bacharach himself recorded the song for his 1965 debut Hit Maker!: Burt Bacharach plays the Burt Bacharach Hits.
- Ella Fitzgerald sang "A House Is Not a Home" at the end of her appearance at the Montreux Jazz Festival in 1969. She also sang it on The Michael Aspel show in 1990 in the UK, and in her Albert Hall concerts, during her last UK performances.
- In 2014, Warwick released a version of the song with singer Ne-Yo on duets album Feels So Good.

Sonny Rollins

Jackie McLean

== Parodies ==
- Psychedelic band Love parodied the song's title on their album Forever Changes in 1967, by naming one of their songs "A House Is Not a Motel".
- Peter Hammill parodied the title on his album The Silent Corner and the Empty Stage in 1974, naming the lengthy final number "A Louse Is Not a Home".
