= Just Being Myself =

Studio album by Dionne Warwick
- Released: January 1973
- Studio: HDH Sound Studios, Detroit
- Length: 33:33
- Label: Warner Bros.
- Producer: Holland-Dozier-Holland

Dionne Warwick chronology
Dionne (1972)	Just Being Myself (1973)	Then Came You (1975)

Singles from Dionne
- 1. "I Think You Need Love / Don't Let My Teardrops Bother You" Released: 1973; 2. "(I'm) Just Being Myself / You're Gonna Need Me" Released: 1973

Just Being Myself is a studio album by American singer Dionne Warwick. It was released by Warner Bros. Records in 1973 in the United States. Her second album with the label, Just Being Myself marked a departure for Warwick who teamed up with Holland-Dozier-Holland to work on the majority of the album after her regular collaborators Burt Bacharach and Hal David had split the year before. The album peaked at number 178 on the US Billboard 200.

== Critical reception ==
Professional ratings
Review scores
Source	Rating
Allmusic	4/5 stars

AllMusic editor Tim Sendra wrote that "the album's title is somewhat ironic because Holland, Dozier and Holland removed Warwick from the creative process, basically asking her to record her vocals over previously recorded backing tracks. Not that most of what they came up with was too far from what she had been recording before since the bulk of the record is made up of lush, orchestrated ballads [...] Just Being Myself is a very interesting and successful record that shows Warwick could be a convincing soul singer and despite her qualms, could succeed, artistically anyway."

== Track listing ==
All tracks produced Holland-Dozier-Holland.

Side one
No.	Title	Writer(s)	Length
1.	"You're Gonna Need Me"	Brian Holland; Lamont Dozier; Eddie Holland; Richard "Popcorn" Wylie	4:20
2.	"I Think You Need Love"	B. Holland; L. Dozier; E. Holland	3:37
3.	"You Are the Heart of Me"	Michael Smith; Ronald Dunbar	4:14
4.	"I Always Get Caught in the Rain"	Smith; Dunbar	3:42

Side two
No.	Title	Writer(s)	Length
5.	"Don't Let My Teardrops Bother You"	B. Holland; L. Dozier; E. Holland; Wylie	4:00
6.	"(I'm) Just Being Myself"	B. Holland; L. Dozier; E. Holland; R. Dozier	4:31
7.	"Come Back"	B. Holland; Dozier; E. Holland	4:30
8.	"Don't Burn the Bridge (That Took You Across)"	B. Holland; Dozier; E. Holland	4:24

== Personnel and credits ==
Credits adapted from the liner notes of Just Being Myself.

- McKinley Jackson – arrangements
- Jerry Hall – recording, mixing
- Brian Holland – recording, mixing
- Lawrence Horn – recording, mixing
- Gene Page – arrangements
- Ed Thrasher – photography
- Barney Perkins – recording, mixing
- Dionne Warwick – vocals

== Charts ==
Chart performance for Just Being Myself
Chart (1973)	Peak position
US Top LP's & Tape (Billboard)	178
US Top 101 to 170 Albums (Cash Box)	108
