= Are You There (with Another Girl) =

"Are You There (With Another Girl)"
- Dutch picture sleeve

Single by Dionne Warwick

from the album Here I Am
- B-side: "If I Ever Make You Cry"
- Released: December 1965
- Length: 2:49
- Label: Scepter
- Songwriter(s): Burt Bacharach, Hal David
- Producer(s): Burt Bacharach, Hal David

Dionne Warwick singles chronology
"Looking with My Eyes" (1965)	"Are You There (With Another Girl)" (1965)	"Message to Michael" (1966)

"Are You There (with Another Girl)" is a song written by Burt Bacharach and Hal David for the American singer Dionne Warwick. Her version, released as a single in December 1965, eventually reached number 39 on the Billboard charts. It also appears as the tenth track on her album Here I Am (1965).

Author Serene Domenic praised the song in the book Burt Bacharach Song by Song, writing of its "droning strings", "strange fret-sliding guitar", and orchestral crescendos which precede the Beatles' "A Day in the Life" (1967). He also speculates that the song influenced Beach Boys composer Brian Wilson for the Pet Sounds track "Let's Go Away for Awhile" (1966).

== Personnel ==
- Dionne Warwick – Lead vocals
- Myrna Warwick – "oom pah pah pity the girl" Backing vocals

== Chart history ==
Chart (1966)	Peak position
US Billboard Hot 100	39
US Hot Rhythm & Blues Singles (Billboard)	35
US Cash Box Top 100	36

== Cover versions ==
- 1965 - Joe Pass, A Sign of the Times
- 1967 – Burt Bacharach, Reach Out
- 1967 – Percy Faith
- 1968 – The Buckinghams, In One Ear and Gone Tomorrow
- 1969 – The Anita Kerr Singers, Reflect on the Hits of Burt Bacharach
- 1970 – Mike Melvoin, Keys to Your Mind
- 1983 – Mari Wilson, Showpeople
- 1990 – Deacon Blue, Four Bacharach & David Songs
- 2001 – Luther Vandross (as "Are You There (With Another Guy)")
- 2014 – Mark Jennett, Everybody Says Don't (as "Are You There with Another Boy")
