= My Friends & Me =

Studio album by Dionne Warwick
- Released: November 7, 2006
- Length: 49:14
- Label: Concord
- Producers: Damon Elliott; Teddy Harmon

Dionne Warwick chronology
My Favorite Time of the Year (2004)	My Friends & Me (2006)	Why We Sing (2008)

My Friends & Me is a studio album by American singer Dionne Warwick. It was released by Concord Records on November 7, 2006 in the United States. Produced by Warwick's son Damon Elliott, the album is a collection of duets with other artists on re-recordings of past songs by Warwick.

== Critical reception ==
Professional ratings
Review scores
Source	Rating
About.com	3/5 stars
AllMusic	3/5 stars

AllMusic editor John Bush praised Warwick's son and chief producer Damon Elliott's production for blending modern R&B elements with the classic Burt Bacharach-inspired sound, but felt that the guest artists often overshadowed Warwick, making the album feel more like a tribute than a true solo project. Mark Edward Nero of About.com praised the album for its nostalgic approach and consistent sound despite its many guest appearances. He noted that while the album offered no major reinvention of the classic songs, Warwick and her collaborators delivered strong performances, highlighting Kelis' rendition of "Raindrops Keep Fallin' on My Head" as a standout while finding some collaborations less effective.

== Track listing ==
All tracks produced by Damon Elliott and co-produced by Teddy Harmon.

No.	Title	Writer(s)	Length
1.	"Walk On By" (with Gloria Estefan)	Burt Bacharach; Hal David	2:56
2.	"Message to Michael" (with Cyndi Lauper)	Bacharach; David	2:59
3.	"Close to You" (with Mýa)	Bacharach; David	4:00
4.	"I'll Never Love This Way Again" (with Gladys Knight)	Richard Kerr; Will Jennings	4:19
5.	"Raindrops Keep Fallin' on My Head" (with Kelis)	Bacharach; David	2:26
6.	"Déjà Vu"	Isaac Hayes; Adrienne Anderson	4:50
7.	"I Say a Little Prayer" (with Reba McEntire)	Bacharach; David	3:08
8.	"Anyone Who Had a Heart" (with Wynonna Judd)	Bacharach; David	3:43
9.	"Then Came You" (with Lisa Tucker)	Sherman Marshall; Phillip Pugh	3:26
10.	"Wishin' and Hopin'" (with Olivia Newton-John)	Bacharach; David	3:03
11.	"Love Will Find a Way" (with Cheyenne Elliott)	Damon Elliott; Terry Steele	4:56
12.	"The Windows of the World" (with Angie Stone, Chanté Moore, Deborah Cox and Da Brat)	Bacharach; David	4:34
13.	"Do You Know the Way to San Jose" (with Celia Cruz)	Bacharach; David	5:46

== Personnel ==
- Dionne Warwick – liner notes, executive producer
- Grecco Buratto – guitar
- John Burk – producer, executive producer
- Ariel Chobaz – mixing
- Damon Elliott – drums, keyboards, producer, programming, engineer, executive producer
- Brian "Big Bass" Gardener – mastering
- Teddy Harmon – bass, keyboards, producer, programming
- Jaysen Joshua – assistant engineer
- Ari Levine – assistant engineer
- Len Peltier – package design
- Dave Pensado – mixing
- David Vance – photography

== Charts ==
Chart (2006)	Peak position
US Top R&B/Hip-Hop Albums (Billboard)	66
