= Why We Sing =

Studio album by Dionne Warwick
- Released: January 28, 2008
- Length: 53:15
- Label: Rhino
- Producer: Percy Bady; Gregory G. Curtis; Damon Elliott; Teddy Harmon; Dionne Warwick; BeBe Winans

Dionne Warwick chronology
My Friends & Me (2006)	Why We Sing (2008)	Only Trust Your Heart (2011)

Why We Sing is a studio album by American singer Dionne Warwick. It was released by Rhino Records on January 28, 2008. Warwick's first gospel album in nearly 40 years, it was produced in part by her son Damon Elliott, also featuring involvement from BeBe Winans, Percy Bady, and the New Hope Baptist Church Choir.

== Critical reception ==
Professional ratings
Review scores
Source	Rating
Allmusic	3.5/5 stars

Allmusic editor John Bush found that on Why We Sing "Warwick's voice may be weaker than in the '60s and '70s, but the productions and guest features are solid. Ironically, even in this gospel medium, where a strong voice is arguably more important than anything else, Warwick succeeds, perhaps by the force of her convictions and the importance of the project in her mind." He noted that the productions don't suffer from "adult contemporary slickness [...] most are recorded with a small group occasionally leavened with strings, and given a light touch by producers Percy Bady and Damon Elliott. Altogether, the results are quite good; it's a highly personal project that permits outsiders to enjoy it, and while it's quite smooth, it's never slick enough to enjoy that adult contemporary or coffeehouse crossover."

== Track listing ==
No.	Title	Length
1.	"Battle Hymn of the Republic"	2:48
2.	"I'm Going Up" (featuring BeBe Winans)	3:36
3.	"With All My Heart"	5:02
4.	"Old Landmark"	4:15
5.	"The World Needs Jesus"	4:55
6.	"I Lift My Heart"	5:25
7.	"Jesus Loves Me"	4:04
8.	"Show Me the Way"	4:21
9.	"Why We Sing" (featuring Dee Dee Warwick)	5:23
10.	"Rise, Shine And Give God the Glory"	4:37
11.	"The Lord Is My Shepherd"	4:40
12.	"Seven" (featuring David Elliott)	4:24

== Charts ==
Chart (2008)	Peak position
US Top Gospel Albums (Billboard)	41

== Release history ==
Region	Date	Format	Label	Ref.
Various	January 28, 2008	CD; digital download	Rhino	
