= Only Trust Your Heart (Dionne Warwick album) =

Studio album by Dionne Warwick
- Released: March 15, 2011
- Length: 44:16
- Label: MPCA; RED
- Producer: Michael Mangini

Dionne Warwick chronology
Why We Sing (2008)	Only Trust Your Heart (2011)	Now (2012)

Only Trust Your Heart is a studio album by American singer Dionne Warwick. It was released by MPCA Records and RED Music on March 15, 2011. A specialty album that is devoted to the work of lyricist Sammy Cahn, it reached the top ten of the US Billboard Top Jazz Albums.

== Critical reception ==
Professional ratings
Review scores
Source	Rating
Allmusic	3.5/5 stars

Allmusic editor William Ruhlmann found that Warwick gives "Cahn's better-known works [...] a variety of musical settings, starting with the bossa nova arrangement of the title song and going on to small jazz bands, big string orchestras, solo piano accompaniments, and even a blues reading ("Keep Me in Mind"). She ignores previous interpretations, making each song her own [...] If she never really put both feet into any one genre of music, that has turned out to serve her well on a late album like this, on which she demonstrates a mastery of several classic pop styles, just as Cahn was able to switch gears as a lyricist-for-hire throughout his distinguished (if often unheralded) career."

== Track listing ==
All tracks produced by Michael Mangini. Tracks 1, 3, 10, 12 orchestrated by Nathan Kelly.

No.	Title	Writer(s)	Length
1.	"Only Trust Your Heart"	Benny Carter; Sammy Cahn	4:32
2.	"You I Love"	Nicholas Brodsky; Cahn	2:26
3.	"I'm a Fool to Want You"	Frank Sinatra; Jack Wolf; Joel Herron	4:10
4.	"Wonder Why"	Jule Styne; Cahn	2:49
5.	"If You Can Dream"	Brodszky; Cahn	4:02
6.	"The Second Time Around"	Jimmy Van Heusen; Cahn	2:30
7.	"Come Out, Come Out Wherever You Are"	Styne; Cahn	2:30
8.	"I'll Never Stop Loving You"	Brodszky; Cahn	5:08
9.	"Some Other Time"	Styne; Cahn	2:48
10.	"I Fall in Love Too Easily"	Styne; Cahn	3:40
11.	"Keep Me in Mind"	Burt Bacharach; Jack Wolf	3:52
12.	"And Then You Kissed Me"	Styne; Cahn	2:56
13.	"Pocketful of Miracles"	Van Heusen; Cahn	2:42

== Charts ==
Chart (2011)	Peak position
US Top Jazz Albums (Billboard)	10

== Release history ==
Region	Date	Format	Label	Ref.
Various	March 15, 2011	CD; digital download	MPCA; RED	
