= Here I Am (Dionne Warwick album) =

Album by Dionne Warwick

Studio album by Dionne Warwick
- Released: December 21, 1965
- Studio: Bell Sound (New York City)
- Genre: R&B
- Label: Scepter
- Producer: Burt Bacharach, Hal David

Dionne Warwick chronology
The Sensitive Sound of Dionne Warwick (1965)	Here I Am (1965)	Dionne Warwick in Paris (1966)

Singles from Here I Am
- 1. "Here I Am" Released: August 1965; 2. "Looking with My Eyes" Released: September 1965; 3. "Are You There (With Another Girl)" Released: December 1965

Professional ratings
Review scores
Source	Rating
Allmusic	4/5 stars
Record Mirror	4/5 stars

Here I Am is the fifth album by the American singer Dionne Warwick, released on December 21, 1965 by Scepter Records. The LP was produced by Burt Bacharach and Hal David. This album, as was usually the case until 1968, was recorded at Bell Sound Studios in New York City.

== History ==
The album's lead single, the title track "Here I Am", was featured in the film What's New Pussycat? Despite this, the single failed to make the Top 40 in the U.S. The follow-up, "Looking With My Eyes", was prominently featured on the dance show "Hullabaloo", but did not make the chart either.

The third single from the album, "Are You There (With Another Girl)" was released in December 1965, and became a hit, making the Top 40.

Several early copies of the album had errors in the album cover, listing tracks such as "It's Love That Really Counts" that were not included on the album itself. Other notable songs featured on the album are the bouncy "Window Wishing", the hauntingly beautiful "If I Ever Make You Cry" and "This Little Light" which featured Warwick herself on the piano.

== Track listing ==
All tracks are written by Burt Bacharach and Hal David, except where noted.

Side one
No.	Title	Length
1.	"In Between the Heartaches"	2:50
2.	"Here I Am"	2:50
3.	"If I Ever Make You Cry"	3:07
4.	"Lookin' with My Eyes"	2:55
5.	"Once in a Lifetime" (Anthony Newley, Leslie Bricusse)	2:54
6.	"This Little Light" (Traditional)	2:10

Side two
No.	Title	Length
7.	"Don't Go Breaking My Heart"	2:21
8.	"Window Wishing"	2:31
9.	"Long Day, Short Night"	2:18
10.	"Are You There (With Another Girl)"	2:50
11.	"How Can I Hurt You"	2:42
12.	"I Loves You Porgy" (George Gershwin, Ira Gershwin, DuBose Heyward)	1:45

== Charts ==
Chart performance for Here I Am
Chart (1966)	Peak position
US Top LP's (Billboard)	41
US Top Selling R&B LP's (Billboard)	3
US Top 100 Albums (Cash Box)	43
US Top 100 LP's (Record World)	31
