= The Sensitive Sound of Dionne Warwick =

Studio album by Dionne Warwick
- Released: February 15, 1965
- Recorded: November–December 1964
- Studio: Pye Recording Studios, London
- Genre: Pop, R&B
- Length: 33:11
- Label: Scepter
- Producer: Burt Bacharach, Hal David

Dionne Warwick chronology
| Make Way for Dionne Warwick (1964) | The Sensitive Sound of Dionne Warwick (1965) | Here I Am (1965) |

Singles from The Sensitive Sound of Dionne Warwick
- 1. "Who Can I Turn To?" Released: February 1965; 2. "You Can Have Him" Released: March 1965

Professional ratings
Review scores
| Source | Rating |
|---|---|
| AllMusic | 4/5 stars |

The Sensitive Sound of Dionne Warwick is the fourth album by the American singer Dionne Warwick, released on February 15, 1965 by the Scepter label. It was produced by Burt Bacharach and Hal David, with Bacharach also arranging the songs.

== History ==
The album is notable for including the singles "Who Can I Turn To" and "You Can Have Him". It also featured a rendition of the standard "Unchained Melody", the song The Righteous Brothers were to take into the Top 10 later the same year. The album was digitally remastered and reissued on CD on November 29, 2011, by Collectables Records.

== Track listing ==
All tracks are written by Burt Bacharach and Hal David, except where noted.

Side one
| No. | Title | Writer(s) | Length |
|---|---|---|---|
| 1. | "Unchained Melody" | Hy Zaret, Alex North | 4:12 |
| 2. | "Who Can I Turn To" | Anthony Newley, Leslie Bricusse | 3:10 |
| 3. | "How Many Days of Sadness" | | 3:21 |
| 4. | "Is There Another Way to Love You" | | 2:30 |
| 5. | "Where Can I Go Without You" | Peggy Lee, Victor Young | 3:05 |

Side two
| No. | Title | Writer(s) | Length |
|---|---|---|---|
| 6. | "You Can Have Him" | Bill Cook | 4:01 |
| 7. | "Wives and Lovers" | | 3:04 |
| 8. | "Don't Say I Didn't Tell You So" | | 3:23 |
| 9. | "Only the Strong, Only the Brave" | | 2:19 |
| 10. | "Forever My Love" | | 2:16 |
| 11. | "That's Not the Answer" | | 2:05 |

== Charts ==
Chart performance for The Sensitive Sound of Dionne Warwick
| Chart (1965) | Peak position |
|---|---|
| US Top LP's (Billboard) | 107 |
| US Top 100 Albums (Cash Box) | 84 |
| US Top LP's Coming Up (Record World) | 1 (101) |
