= Dionne (1972 album) =

Studio album by Dionne Warwick
- Released: January 1972
- Studio: A & R (New York City)
- Length: 36:40
- Label: Warner Bros.
- Producer: Burt Bacharach; Bob James; Don Sebesky

Dionne Warwick chronology
Very Dionne (1970)	Dionne (1972)	Just Being Myself (1973)

Singles from Dionne
- 1. "If We Only Have Love" Released: February 1972

Dionne is a studio album by American singer Dionne Warwick. It was released by Warner Bros. Records in January 1972 in the United States. Her debut with the label following her departure from Scepter Records after the release of Very Dionne (1970), it features production by Burt Bacharach, Bob James, and Don Sebesky. Her lowest-charting album in years, it peaked at number 54 on the US Billboard 200, her highest peak during her stint with Warner Bros. Records.

== Critical reception ==
Professional ratings
Review scores
Source	Rating
Allmusic	3/5 stars

AllMusic editor Tim Sendra found that "the record is only half good because half of the record is not arranged and produced by Bacharach. Instead, the chores are (mis)handled by Bob James and Don Sebesky, both of whom imitate the lush and sweeping sound of Bacharach but with none of his subtlety, wit or grace."

== Track listing ==
All songs written by Burt Bacharach and Hal David, except where noted.

Side one
No.	Title	Writer(s)	Producer(s)	Length
1.	"Just Have to Breathe"		Bacharach	3:52
2.	"The Balance of Nature"		Bacharach	3:28
3.	"If You Never Say Goodbye"		Bacharach	3:12
4.	"Close to You"		Bob James	2:51
5.	"My First Night Alone Without You"	Kin Vassy	Don Sebesky	2:55

Side two
No.	Title	Writer(s)	Producer(s)	Length
6.	"Be Aware"		Bacharach	4:32
7.	"Love Song"	Lesley Duncan	Sebesky	3:03
8.	"One Less Bell to Answer"		James	4:37
9.	"If We Only Have Love"	Jacques Brel; Eric Blau; Mort Shuman	Sebesky	4:16
10.	"Hasbrook Heights"		James	3:26

== Personnel and credits ==
Credits adapted from the liner notes of Dionne.

- Burt Bacharach – arrangements, conducting
- Bob James – arrangements, conducting
- Phil Ramone – recording engineer
- Don Sebesky – arrangements, conducting
- Ed Thrasher – art direction, photography
- Dionne Warwick – vocals

== Charts ==
Chart performance for Dionne
Chart (1972)	Peak position
US Top LP's & Tape (Billboard)	54
US Best Selling Soul LP's (Billboard)	22
US Top 100 Albums (Cash Box)	41
US The Album Chart (Record World)	44
