= Peleg Top =

Peleg Top (Hebrew: פֶּלֶג טוֹפ; born 1967 in Israel) is a designer, author, speaker, and business owner.

Top moved with his family to Los Angeles, where he still resides, at age 15. At 23, Top founded Top Design, a graphic design company focused on cause-related work.

As a mentor and speaker, Top specializes in helping entrepreneurs grow their businesses. As an author, Peleg published several books, including Design for Special Events (Rockport Publishers), Letterhead & Logo Design (Rockport Publishers) and The Designer's Guide to Marketing and Pricing (How Books). In 2010, HarperCollins released two more books by Top: Designing for the Greater Good and Logolicious.
