= Presenting Dionne Warwick =

Studio album by Dionne Warwick
- Released: April 1963
- Studio: Bell Sound (New York City)
- Length: 31:18
- Label: Scepter
- Producer: Burt Bacharach; Hal David

Dionne Warwick chronology
Presenting Dionne Warwick (1963)	Anyone Who Had a Heart (1963)

Singles from Presenting Dionne Warwick
- 1. "Don't Make Me Over" Released: October 1962; 2. "This Empty Place" Released: March 1963; 3. "Make the Music Play" Released: July 1963

Presenting Dionne Warwick is the debut studio album by American singer Dionne Warwick. It was released by Scepter Records on April 10, 1963 in the United States. Composers Burt Bacharach and Hal David provided three-quarters of the track listing, having met Warwick during the summer of 1961 at Bell Sound Studios when she was working as a background singer during the recording session for The Drifters' minor hit "Mexican Divorce" (1962). The songwriters would go on to become frequent collaborators on subsequent Warwick projects. Presenting Dionne Warwick peaked at number 14 on the UK Albums Chart and spawned the lead single "Don't Make Me Over" which reached number five on the US Hot R&B Singles chart and became a top-forty hit on several international charts.

== Background ==
Presenting Dionne Warwick is notable for including "Don't Make Me Over", Warwick's debut single, as well as "Wishin' & Hopin'", which would become a hit for Dusty Springfield in 1964, "It's Love That Really Counts", which brought Warwick to the attention of Scepter owner Florence Greenberg, and "Make It Easy on Yourself". "Zip-a-Dee-Doo-Dah" features backing vocals by Dionne's sister Dee Dee Warwick and The Shirelles. Presenting Dionne Warwick was digitally remastered and reissued on CD on May 15, 2007 by Collectors' Choice Music.

== Critical reception ==
Professional ratings
Review scores
Source	Rating
Allmusic	4/5 stars
Pitchfork	8.5/10

In the 21st century, AllMusic editor Lindsay Planer gave the album four stars out of five. She wrote:

Warwick's inviting voice was at the core of their successful working relationship, coupled with the undeniably unique and expertly crafted material, yielding a host of classics such as "Wishin' and Hopin'." The version here predates Dusty Springfield's rendering and was likewise much of the reason Springfield chose to cover it to begin with. Other seminal entries featured on Presenting Dionne Warwick are "Make It Easy on Yourself" and the lovelorn melancholy ballad "I Cry Alone," as well as the unique arrangement of "Zip-A-Dee-Doo-Dah."

A 2023 review from Pitchfork rated this release an 8.5 out of 10, with critic Andy Cush calling it "an imperfect lens through which to examine her artistry", but he traces the singer's career up to this release and highlights several tracks as exceptional, writing that "the ghostly minimalism of the demos" enhances the listening experience.

== Track listing ==
Side one
No.	Title	Writer(s)	Length
1.	"This Empty Place"	Burt Bacharach; Hal David	2:55
2.	"Wishin' and Hopin'"	Bacharach; David	2:55
3.	"I Cry Alone"	Bacharach; David	2:37
4.	"Zip-a-Dee-Doo-Dah"	Ray Gilbert; Allie Wrubel	2:40
5.	"Make the Music Play"	Bacharach; David	2:25
6.	"If You See Bill"	Luther Dixon	2:58

Side two
No.	Title	Writer(s)	Length
7.	"Don't Make Me Over"	Bacharach; David	2:46
8.	"It's Love That Really Counts"	Bacharach; David	2:16
9.	"Unlucky"	Lillian Shockley; Bobby Banks	2:25
10.	"I Smiled Yesterday"	Bacharach; David	2:44
11.	"Make It Easy on Yourself"	Bacharach; David	2:40
12.	"The Love of a Boy"	Bacharach; David	1:59

UK version
No.	Title	Writer(s)	Length
1.	"Make the Music Play"	Bacharach; David	2:25
2.	"Anyone Who Had a Heart"	Bacharach; David	3:04
3.	"Shall I Tell Her"	Doc Pomus; Mort Shuman	2:29
4.	"Don't Make Me Over"	Bacharach; David	2:46
5.	"I Cry Alone"	Bacharach; David	2:37
6.	"Getting Ready for the Heartbreak"	Larry Weiss; Lockie Edwards Jr.	2:33
7.	"Oh Lord What Are You Doing to Me"	Luther Dixon; Bert Keyes	3:15
8.	"Walk on By"	Bacharach; David	2:58
9.	"Any Old Time of the Day"	Bacharach; David	3:18
10.	"Mr. Heartbreak"	Barbara English; Al Cleveland	2:32
11.	"Put Yourself in My Place"	Reggie Obrecht; William Drain	2:12
12.	"I Could Make You Mine"	Bacharach; David	2:25
13.	"This Empty Place"	Bacharach; David	2:55
14.	"Please Make Him Love Me"	Bacharach; David	2:33

== Charts ==
Chart performance for Presenting Dionne Warwick
Chart (1963)	Peak position
UK Albums (OCC)	14
