= Warm and Tender =

Studio album by Olivia Newton-John
- Released: October 1989
- Recorded: 1988
- Studios: Melbourne Concert Hall and Metropolis Audio (Melbourne, Australia); Ocean Way Recording (Hollywood, California, USA)
- Genre: Children's
- Length: 41:27
- Label: Geffen
- Producer: John Farrar

Olivia Newton-John chronology
| The Rumour (1988) | Warm and Tender (1989) | Back to Basics: The Essential Collection 1971–1992 (1992) |

Singles from Warm and Tender
- 1. "Reach Out for Me" Released: 1989; 2. "When You Wish Upon a Star" Released: 1989

Professional ratings
Review scores
| Source | Rating |
|---|---|
| AllMusic | 2.5/5 stars |

Warm and Tender is the fifteenth studio album and first of children's lullabies released by Olivia Newton-John in October 1989. After being absent on Newton-John's last album The Rumour, producer John Farrar returned for this album. After recording extensively in the UK and US throughout her career, this was Newton-John's first album recorded in her hometown of Melbourne.

"Reach Out for Me" peaked at number 32 on the Billboard Adult Contemporary charts and number 153 on the ARIA Charts.

== Reception ==
AllMusic praised the album as "a major achievement for Olivia Newton-John, a majestic combination of lullabies and standards," further commenting "if Olivia Newton-John made Warm and Tender to prove to the world that she is an artist with depth and courage, she achieved her goal. It's a marvelous recording."

In their review of the album, Billboard commented that "(Geffen) label debut finds the Aussie lass gratefully shedding her contrived sexpot image and donning the serene veneer of motherhood. Beautifully orchestrated set of lullabies could warm the heart of the toughest AC programmer...This is the perfect environment for Newton-John's smooth and silky voice, and may very well be the springboard for her return into the pop spotlight."

Cashbox noted that "motherhood has really had quite an effect on everyone's favorite Xanadu roller babe. No longer does she yodel about hopeless devotion or high school graduations. This is Olivia: the Mother, crooning every childhood ditty that you can recall and even a few that you can't. ...The entire album is dreamy, ethereal sleepy-time music, so effective...I don't see a lot of commercial possibilities here, but it seems as if Olivia is after a more loving-expression kind of thing rather than her former hungry-for-pop success."

== Track listing ==
Warm and Tender track listing
| No. | Title | Writer(s) | Length |
|---|---|---|---|
| 1. | "Jenny Rebecca" | Carol Hall | 3:46 |
| 2. | "Rocking" | Traditional, lyrics by Percy Dearmer | 3:05 |
| 3. | "Way You Look Tonight" | Jerome Kern, Dorothy Fields | 2:59 |
| 4. | "Lullaby, Lullaby, My Lovely One" | German lullaby | 1:16 |
| 5. | "You'll Never Walk Alone" | Richard Rodgers, Oscar Hammerstein II | 2:49 |
| 6. | "Sleep My Princess" | Mozart's Cradle Song | 1:08 |
| 7. | "The Flower That Shattered the Stone" | Joe Henry, John Jarvis | 3:22 |
| 8. | "Twinkle Twinkle Little Star" | Traditional | 0:55 |
| 9. | "Warm and Tender" | Newton-John, Farrar | 3:21 |
| 10. | "Rock-a-bye Baby" | Public domain | 0:42 |
| 11. | "Over the Rainbow" | Harold Arlen, E. Y. Harburg | 3:26 |
| 12. | "Twelfth of Never" | Paul Francis Webster, Jerry Livingston | 4:23 |
| 13. | "All the Pretty Little Horses" | Traditional | 1:10 |
| 14. | "When You Wish upon a Star" | Ned Washington, Leigh Harline | 3:22 |
| 15. | "Reach Out for Me" (with Brahms Lullaby intro and reprise) | Burt Bacharach, Hal David | 5:55 |

== Personnel ==
=== Musicians ===
- Olivia Newton-John – vocals, arrangements (2, 4, 6, 8, 10, 13, 15)
- Graeme Lyall – all orchestral arrangements and conductor
- The Victorian Philharmonic Orchestra:
- Rudolf Osadnik – leader
- Ron Layton – contractor
- Joe Chindamo – acoustic piano, keyboards
- Adrian Scott – programming
- Don Stevenson – guitars
- Ben Robertson – bass
- Robert Clarke – percussion
- Alex Pertout – percussion
- Vernon Hill – flute
- Vicki Philipson – oboe
- Stephen Robinson – Cor anglais
- Julie Rains – harp

Other musicians

- "Warm and Tender" – all instruments by Brian Mann and John Farrar
- "Reach Out for Me" – all instruments by Brian Mann and John Farrar; Synclavier by Sean Callery
- "The Flower That Shattered the Stone" – synthesizers by Brian Mann; Synclavier by Sean Callery

=== Production ===
- John Farrar – producer
- Allan Sides – engineer, mixing
- Ian McKenzie – additional engineer
- Eric Rudd – assistant engineer
- Bernie Grundman – mastering at Bernie Grundman Mastering (Hollywood, California)
- Gabrielle Raumberger – art direction
- Larry Vigon Studio – design, album logo
- Alberto Tolot – front cover photography
- Nancy Manning – dust sleeve photography
- Billy Sammeth – management

== Charts ==
Chart performance for Warm and Tender
| Chart (1989–1990) | Peak position |
|---|---|
| Australian Albums (ARIA) | 109 |
| Japanese Albums (Oricon) | 43 |
| US Billboard 200 | 124 |
| US Cashbox Top 200 Albums | 151 |
