= Bright Moments =

Bright Moments may refer to:

- Bright Moments (Rahsaan Roland Kirk album)
- Bright Moments (Max Roach album)
