= Anyone Who Had a Heart (Dionne Warwick album) =

Studio album by Dionne Warwick
- Released: February 1964
- Recorded: 1963
- Studio: Bell Sound (New York City)
- Genre: Pop, R&B
- Length: 32:07
- Label: Scepter
- Producer: Burt Bacharach, Hal David

Dionne Warwick chronology
Presenting Dionne Warwick (1963)	Anyone Who Had a Heart (1964)	Make Way for Dionne Warwick (1964)

Singles from Anyone Who Had a Heart
- 1. "Anyone Who Had a Heart" Released: December 1963

Professional ratings
Review scores
Source	Rating
AllMusic	4/5 stars
The Encyclopedia of Popular Music	4/5 stars

Anyone Who Had a Heart is the second album by the American singer Dionne Warwick, released in 1964 on the Scepter label. It was produced by Burt Bacharach and Hal David.

== History ==
The album is notable for including the title track, which became Warwick's first top ten hit on the Billboard Hot 100. Also featured are three tracks which appeared on her first album, Presenting Dionne Warwick issued the year before: "Don't Make Me Over", '"This Empty Place", and "I Cry Alone". These three tracks are exactly identical to the versions on the previous album, and are not different takes or remixes. The album was digitally remastered and reissued on CD on November 29, 2011, by Collectables Records.

== Track listing ==
All tracks are written by Hal David and Burt Bacharach, except where noted.

Side one
No.	Title	Writer(s)	Length
1.	"Anyone Who Had a Heart"		3:11
2.	"Shall I Tell Her"	Doc Pomus, Mort Shuman	2:33
3.	"Don't Make Me Over"		2:46
4.	"I Cry Alone"		2:37
5.	"Getting Ready for the Heartbreak"	Lockie Edwards Jr., Larry Weiss	2:30
6.	"Oh Lord, What Are You Doing to Me"	Luther Dixon, Bert Keyes	3:14

Side two
No.	Title	Writer(s)	Length
7.	"Any Old Time of Day"		3:08
8.	"Mr. Heartbreak"	Barbara English, Al Cleveland	2:33
9.	"Put Yourself in My Place"	Reggie Obrecht, William Drain	2:20
10.	"I Could Make You Mine"		2:25
11.	"This Empty Place"		2:55
12.	"Please Make Him Love Me"		2:33

== Personnel ==
- Bob Fisher: Mastering
- Richie Unterberger: Liner Notes
- Dionne Warwick: Vocals

== Singles ==
Year	Title	Peak positions			
Year	Title	US	US R&B^{[A]}	US A/C	UK
1963	"Anyone Who Had a Heart"	8	6	2	42
1963	"This Empty Place"	84	26	-	-

- ^{A} From November 30, 1963, to January 23, 1965, Billboard Magazine did not publish a Hot R&B Songs chart. The peak positions for R&B singles listed during this period are from Cash Box Magazine R&B Songs chart.
