= Dionne Warwick =

American singer (born 1940)

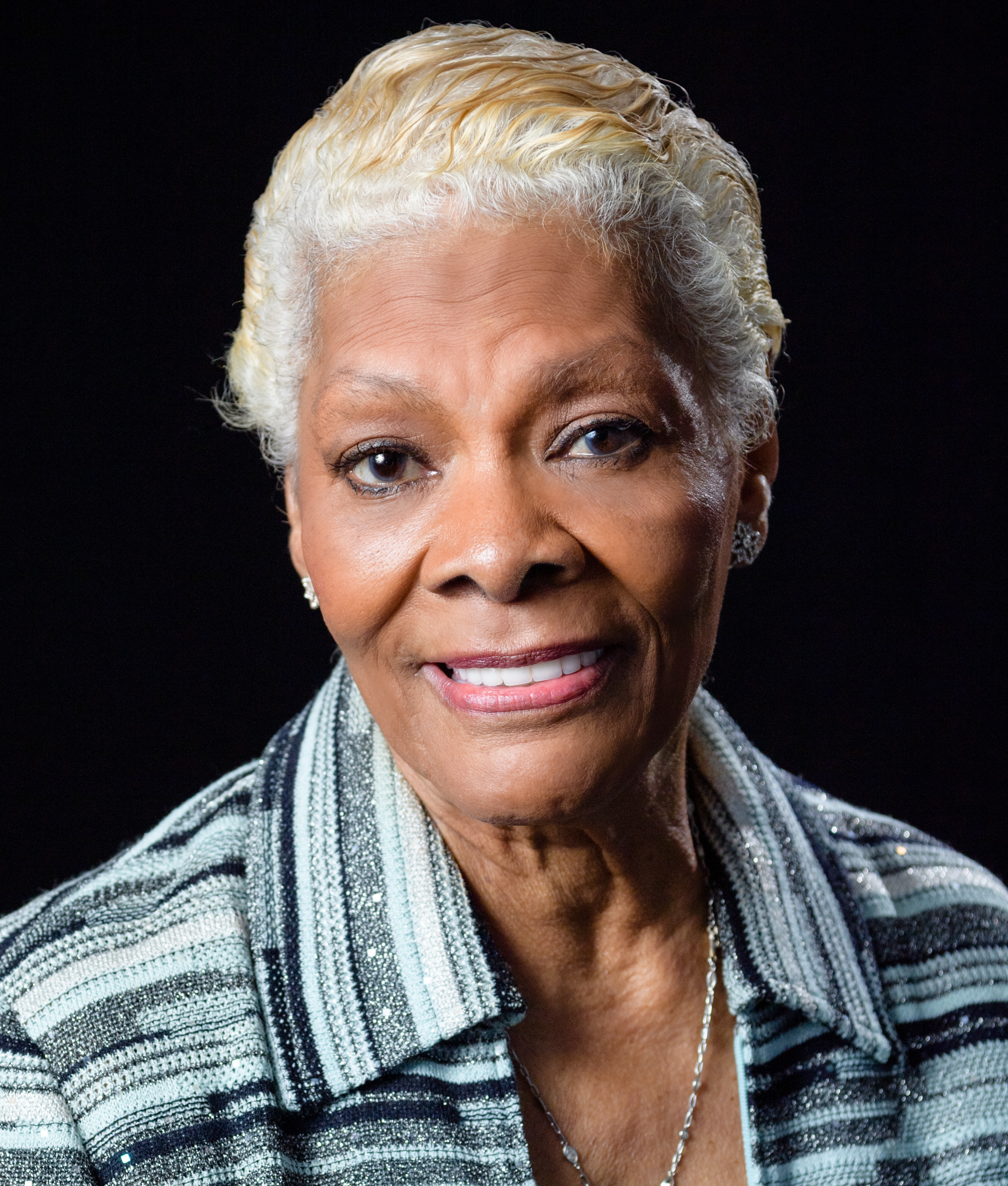
- Warwick in 2021
- Born: Marie Dionne Warrick; December 12, 1940 (age 85); East Orange, New Jersey, U.S.
- Education: University of Hartford
- Occupations: Singer; actress; television host
- Years active: 1955–present
- Spouses: William Elliott (m. 1966; div. 1967) (m. 1967; div. 1975)
- Children: 2, including Damon
- Relatives: Dee Dee Warwick (sister); Cissy Houston (aunt); Whitney Houston (cousin); Gary Garland (cousin); Bobbi Kristina Brown (cousin once removed); Leontyne Price (cousin once removed)
- Musical career
- Genres: R&B; pop; soul; gospel
- Instrument: Vocals
- Labels: Scepter; Warner Bros.; Arista; River North; Concord; Rhino
- Website: officialdionnewarwick.com

Marie Dionne Warwick (/diˈɒn ˈwɔːrwɪk/ dee-ON WOR-wik; née Warrick; born December 12, 1940) is an American singer, actress, and television host. Born in East Orange, New Jersey, Warwick started her career as a teenager in the vocal group the Gospelaires before starting her solo career in 1962, with composers Burt Bacharach and Hal David on a series of hit singles under the Scepter Records label, including "Don't Make Me Over", "Anyone Who Had a Heart", "Walk on By", "Alfie", "I Say a Little Prayer" and the Grammy-winning "Do You Know the Way to San Jose".

After a fallout with Bacharach and David and a period slump with Warner Bros Records, Warwick revived her career under the mentorship of Clive Davis at Arista Records with a series of hit singles such as "I'll Never Love This Way Again", "Heartbreaker" and "That's What Friends Are For". In the 1990s, Warwick gained notoriety for hosting the infomercial Psychic Friends Network.

Warwick ranks among the 40 biggest U.S. hit makers between 1955 and 1999, based on her chart history on Billboard's Hot 100 pop singles chart. She is the second-most charted female vocalist during the rock era (1955–1999), as well as one of the most-charted vocalists of all time, with 56 of her singles making the Hot 100 between 1962 and 1998, including 12 top ten singles and two number one singles. Warwick ranks number 74 on the Billboard Hot 100 "Greatest Artists of All Time".

During her decades-long career, Warwick has won many accolades, including six competitive Grammy Awards. Warwick has been inducted into the Hollywood Walk of Fame, the Grammy Hall of Fame, the National Rhythm and Blues Hall of Fame and the Apollo Theater Walk of Fame. In 2019, Warwick won the Grammy Lifetime Achievement Award. In 2024, Warwick was inducted into the Rock and Roll Hall of Fame in the Musical Excellence category.

== Early life and career ==
Marie Dionne Warrick was born in East Orange, New Jersey on December 12, 1940, the eldest of three children to Arthur Lee "Nana" (née Drinkard) and Mancel Leland Warrick. Her mother was manager of the Drinkard Singers, a family gospel group. Her father was a gospel record promoter and also worked as a Pullman porter, chef, record promoter, and CPA.

Warwick was named after her maternal aunt Marie "Reebie" Drinkard Epps; Warwick preferred to be called by her middle name. Warwick had two younger siblings, sister Delia Juanita "Dee Dee" (1942-2008) and brother Mancel "Pookie" Jr. (1947-1968).

Her parents were both Foundational Black American, and Warwick also has a smaller amount of Irish and English ancestry on the maternal side of her family. Warwick began singing gospel as a child at her grandfather Rev. Elzae Warrick's AME church in Newark, New Jersey, where he was pastor where at six, she sang her first church solo, "Jesus Loves Me". As a teenager, she began singing at Newark's New Hope Baptist Church after her grandfather began pastoring there.

Raised in what was a mixed-race suburban neighborhood of East Orange, Warwick was a girl scout during her adolescent years. After attending Lincoln School, she graduated from East Orange High School in 1959 and attended Hartt College of Music in West Hartford, Connecticut on a music scholarship.

During her adolescence and teenage years, Warwick and her sister were being vocally mentored by their aunt Cissy Drinkard, who at one point lived at the Warricks' East Orange home in the early 1950s.

At fourteen, Warwick and her sister Dee Dee began singing together as part of the gospel vocal group the Gospelaires, a splinter group of the Drinkard Singers, her mother and aunt's group. The original members of the Gospelaires were the Warrick sisters, Gloria Harding, Sylvia Shemwell and Myrna Smith. All five members were vocally trained by Warwick's aunt Emily "Cissy" Houston at New Hope.

In 1959, Cissy's then-boyfriend John Houston offered to manage the group after Lee Warrick refused Houston's offer to manage the Drinkard Singers. While opening for the Drinkards at the Apollo Theater, a studio musician came backstage asking for several female singers to back an R&B saxophonist named Sam "the Man" Taylor for a recording session.

According to Warwick, she volunteered for her group. As she could recall, "a man came running frantically backstage at the Apollo and said he needed background singers for a session for Sam 'The Man' Taylor, and old big-mouth here spoke up and said 'We'll do it!' and we left and did the session. I wish I remembered the gentleman's name because he was responsible for the beginning of my professional career." After the session, the Gloryaires soon became an in-demand vocal group singing for R&B and soul artists such as the Drifters, Dinah Washington, Solomon Burke and Chuck Jackson.

In 2002, Warwick recalled that, on weekdays after school, the girls would catch a bus from East Orange to the Port Authority Terminal, then take the subway to the recording studios in Manhattan, perform their background vocal work, and still be back at home in East Orange with time to do their school homework. Warwick's music work would continue while she pursued her studies at Hartt.

While recording background for the Drifters' "Mexican Divorce", Warwick's voice and star presence were noticed by the song's composer, Burt Bacharach, a Brill Building songwriter who was writing songs with many other songwriters, including lyricist Hal David.

According to a July 14, 1967, article on Warwick in Time, Bacharach stated, "She has a tremendous strong side and a delicacy when singing softly – like miniature ships in bottles." Musically, she was no "play-safe girl. What emotion I could get away with!" Bacharach asked Warwick if she would be interested in recording demonstration recordings of his compositions to pitch the tunes to record labels, paying her $12.50 per demo recording session (equivalent to $130 in 2025).

One such demo, "It's Love That Really Counts" – destined to be recorded by Scepter-signed act the Shirelles – caught the attention of the president of Scepter Records, Florence Greenberg, who, according to Current Biography (1969 Yearbook), told Bacharach, "Forget the song, get the girl!"

Warwick was signed to Bacharach's and David's production company, according to Warwick, which in turn was signed to Scepter Records in 1962 by Greenberg. The partnership would provide Bacharach with the freedom to produce Warwick without the control of recording company executives and company A&R men. Warwick's musical ability and education would also allow Bacharach to compose more challenging tunes. The demo version of "It's Love That Really Counts", along with her original demo of "Make It Easy on Yourself", would surface on Warwick's debut Scepter album, Presenting Dionne Warwick, which was released in early 1963.

Her albums in 1971-74 spelled her named "Warwicke" but she dropped the trailing "e" in 1975.

== Career ==
=== Early stardom (1962–1965) ===
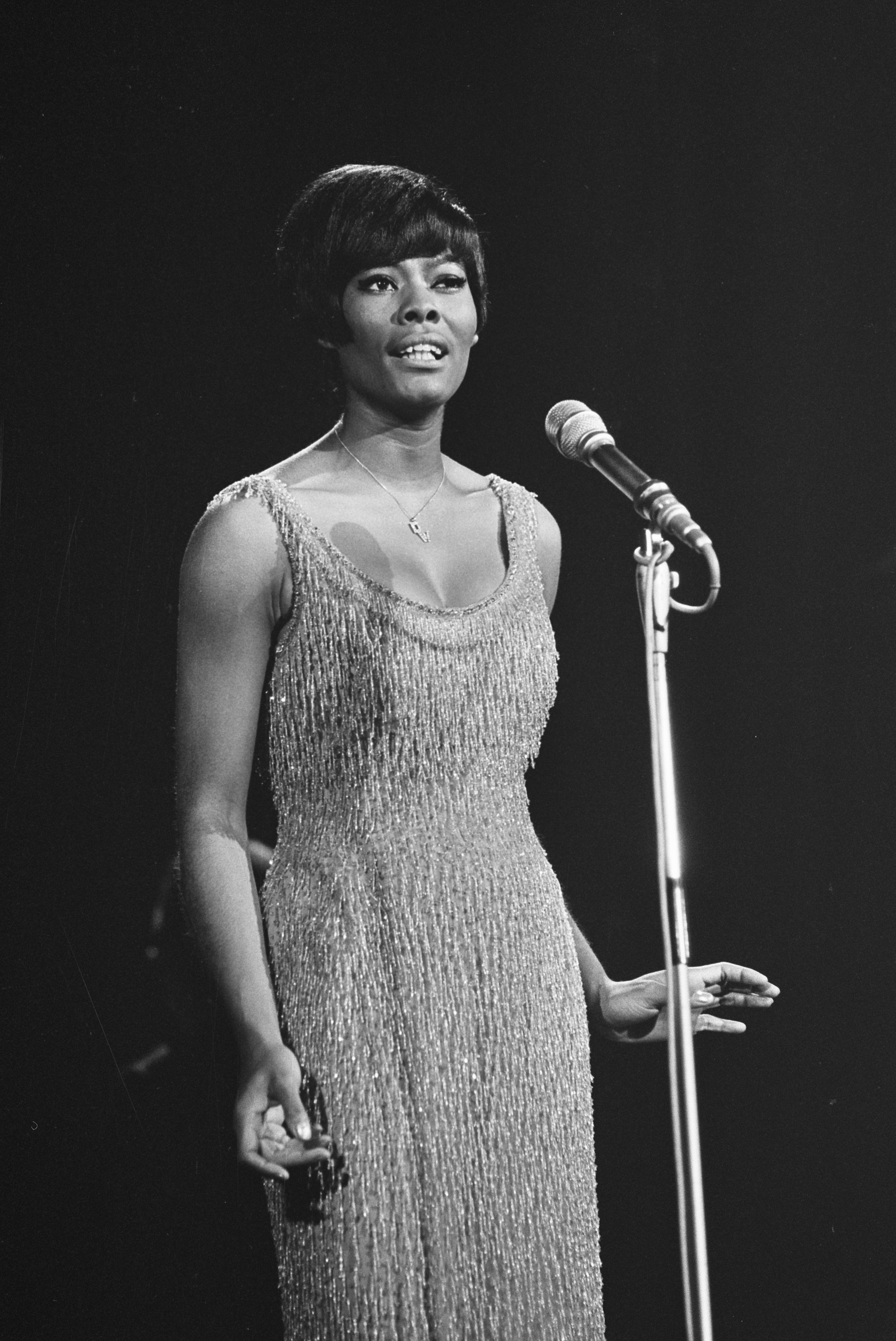
Warwick performing in Amsterdam, 1966

In November 1962, Scepter Records released Warwick's first solo single, "Don't Make Me Over", the title of which Warwick supplied herself when she snapped the phrase at producers Burt Bacharach and Hal David in anger. Warwick had found out that "Make It Easy on Yourself" – a song on which she had recorded the original demo and had wanted to be her first single release – had been given to another artist, Jerry Butler. From the phrase "don't make me over", Bacharach and David created the song, to which Warwick recorded the following day. The song became Warwick's first top 40 pop and R&B hit, peaking at number 21 on the Billboard Hot 100 and number 5 on the Hot R&B Singles chart. Warrick's name was misspelled on the single's label, and she began using the new spelling, "Warwick", both professionally and personally. After "Don't Make Me Over" hit in 1962, the 22-year-old singer answered the call of her manager, left school and went on a tour of France, where critics crowned her "Paris' Black Pearl", having been introduced on stage at Paris Olympia that year by Marlene Dietrich.

After her two immediate follow-ups, "This Empty Place" and "Make The Music Play", barely cracked the Hot 100, her fourth release, "Anyone Who Had a Heart", released in November 1963, was Warwick's first top 10 pop hit, peaking at number eight on the Hot 100 and was her first international million-seller. In April 1964, Warwick released "Walk On By", which peaked at number six on the Hot 100 and also hit the top ten in the UK and other countries. During this period, Warwick found herself competing with many acts from the British Invasion and managed to hold her own better than most American artists.

Warwick's success in the United Kingdom was modest as most of her songs were covered by British singers Cilla Black, Sandie Shaw and Dusty Springfield. The most notable cover of Warwick's that became a hit cover was Black's "Anyone Who Had a Heart", which went to No. 1 in the UK. This upset Warwick, who described feeling insulted when told that in the UK, record company executives wanted her songs recorded by someone else. Warwick met Cilla Black while on tour in Britain. She recalled what she said to Black: "I told her that 'You're My World' would be my next single in the States. I honestly believe that if I'd sneezed on my next record, then Cilla would have sneezed on hers too. There was no imagination in her recording." Warwick later covered two of Cilla's songs – "You're My World" appeared on Dionne Warwick in Valley of the Dolls, released in 1968 and on the soundtrack to Alfie. Throughout 1964 alone, Warwick charted six hits on the Cash Box Top 100 Singles chart, resulting in Warwick being named the Bestselling Female Vocalist of 1964 in its year-end poll.

In Time's cover article of May 21, 1965, titled "Rock 'n' Roll: The Sound of the Sixties", Warwick's sound was described as:

Swinging World. Scholarly articles probe the relationship between the Beatles and the nouvelle vague films of Jean-Luc Godard, discuss "the brio and elegance" of Dionne Warwick's singing style as a 'pleasurable but complex' event to be 'experienced without condescension.' In chic circles, anyone damning rock 'n' roll is labeled not only square but uncultured. For inspirational purposes, such hip artists as Robert Rauschenberg, Larry Rivers and Andy Warhol occasionally paint while listening to rock 'n' roll music. Explains Warhol: "It makes me mindless, and I paint better." After gallery openings in Manhattan, the black-tie gatherings often adjourn to a discothèque.

In 1965, Eon Productions intended to use Warwick's song titled "Mr. Kiss Kiss Bang Bang" as the theme song of the James Bond film Thunderball, until Albert R. Broccoli insisted that the theme song include the film's title. A new song titled "Thunderball" was composed and recorded at the eleventh hour, performed by Tom Jones. The melody of "Mr. Kiss Kiss Bang Bang" remains a major component of the film score. The Ultimate Edition DVD of Thunderball has the Warwick song playing over the titles on one of the commentary track extras, and the song was released on the 30th-anniversary CD of Bond songs.

=== Chart success (1966–1971) ===
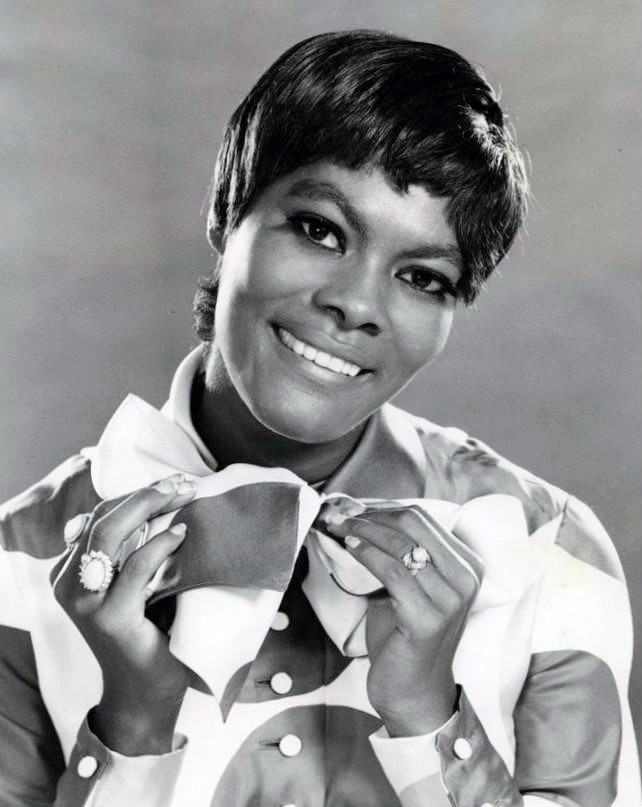
Warwick in 1969

The mid-1960s to early 1970s were a more successful time period for Warwick, who saw a string of gold-selling albums and hit singles. "Message to Michael", a Bacharach-David composition that the duo was certain was a "man's song", became a top 10 hit for Warwick in May 1966.

In January 1967, Warwick released the album Here Where There Is Love, which became her first RIAA certified gold album and produced three hit singles, "Trains and Boats and Planes", "I Just Don't Know What to Do with Myself" and "Alfie". Initially a b-side to another single, "Alfie" became a radio hit when disc jockeys across the nation began to play the album cut early in 1967.

Initially released as a b-side, Warwick's recording of "I Say a Little Prayer" became another huge hit, peaking at number four respectively in the US and Canada. The tune was also the first RIAA certified USA million selling single for Bacharach and David.

Her follow-up to "I Say a Little Prayer", "(Theme from) Valley of the Dolls", was unusual in several respects. It was not written by Burt Bacharach and Hal David, it was the b-side of "I Say a Little Prayer", and it was a song that she almost did not record. While the film version of Valley of the Dolls was being made, actress Barbara Parkins suggested that Warwick be considered to sing the film's theme song, written by songwriting team André and Dory Previn. The song was to be recorded by Judy Garland, who was subsequently fired from the film.

Warwick performed the song, and when the film became a success in the early weeks of 1968, disc jockeys flipped the single and made the single one of the biggest double-sided hits of the rock era and another million seller. At the time, RIAA rules allowed only one side of a double-sided hit single to be certified as gold, but Scepter awarded Warwick an "in-house award" to recognize "(Theme from) Valley of the Dolls" as a million selling tune.

Warwick had re-recorded a Pat Williams-arranged version of the theme at A&R Studios in New York because contractual restrictions with her label would not allow the Warwick version from the film to be included on the 20th Century Fox soundtrack LP, and reverse legal restrictions would not allow the film version to be used anyplace else in a commercial LP. The LP Dionne Warwick in Valley of the Dolls, released in early 1968 and containing the re-recorded version of the movie theme (No. 2 for three weeks), "Do You Know the Way to San Jose?" and several new Bacharach-David compositions, hit the No. 6 position on the Billboard album chart and would remain on the chart for over a year. The film soundtrack LP, without Warwick vocals, failed to impress the public, while Dionne Warwick in Valley of the Dolls earned an RIAA gold certification.

The single "Do You Know the Way to San Jose?" became another international hit, reaching the top ten in the US, UK, Canada, Australia, South Africa, Japan and Mexico among other countries. The song resulted in Warwick winning her first Grammy Award for Best Female Pop Vocal Performance in 1969, becoming just the second black female artist to win in the category after Ella Fitzgerald while Warwick became the first female contemporary pop artist to win in the category after it switched its focus from vocal music to contemporary pop music. Other notable hits included "Promises, Promises", "This Girl's in Love with You" and "I'll Never Fall in Love Again".

Other Scepter LPs certified RIAA gold included Dionne Warwick's Golden Hits Part 1 released in 1967 and The Dionne Warwicke Story: A Decade of Gold released in 1971. Cash Box named Warwick the Top Female Vocalist in 1969, 1970 and 1971. In the 1967 Cash Box poll, she was second to Petula Clark, and in the 1968 poll, second to Aretha Franklin. Playboy's influential Music Poll of 1970 named her the Top Female Vocalist. In 1969, Harvard's Hasty Pudding Society named her Woman of the Year.

By the end of 1971, Warwick had sold an estimated 35 million singles and albums internationally in less than nine years and more than 16 million singles in the U.S. alone. Exact figures of her sales are unknown and probably underestimated, due to Scepter Records' apparently lax accounting policies and the company policy of not submitting recordings for RIAA audit. Warwick became the first Scepter artist to request RIAA audits of her recordings in 1967 with the release of "I Say a Little Prayer".

On September 17, 1969, CBS Television aired Warwick's first television special, titled The Dionne Warwick Chevy Special. Warwick's guests were Burt Bacharach, George Kirby, Glen Campbell, and Creedence Clearwater Revival. In 1970, Warwick formed her own label, Sonday Records, of which she was president. Sonday was distributed by Scepter.

In 1970, she was a performer on the prestigious Royal Variety Performance at the London Palladium, singing The Look of Love, What the World Needs Now and Come Together.

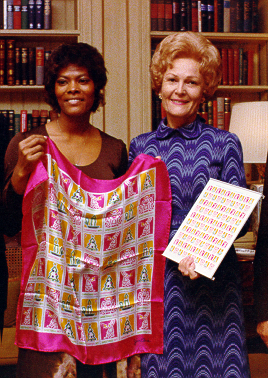
Warwick with First Lady Pat Nixon in 1971

In 1971, Warwick left the family atmosphere of Scepter Records for Warner Bros. Records, for a $5 million contract, the most lucrative recording contract given to a female vocalist up to that time, according to Variety. Warwick's last LP for Scepter was the soundtrack for the motion picture The Love Machine, in which she appeared in an uncredited cameo, released in July 1971. In 1975, Bacharach and David sued Scepter Records for an accurate accounting of royalties due to the team from their recordings with Warwick and labelmate B.J. Thomas. They were awarded almost $600,000 and the rights to all Bacharach/David recordings on the Scepter label. The label, with the defection of Warwick to Warner Bros. Records, filed for bankruptcy in 1975 and was sold to Springboard International Records in 1976.

Following her signing with Warner, with Bacharach and David as writers and producers, Warwick returned to New York City's A&R Studios in late 1971 to begin recording her first album for the new label, the self-titled Dionne (not to be confused with her later Arista debut album) in January 1972. The album peaked at No. 57 on the Billboard 200. In 1972, Burt Bacharach and Hal David scored and wrote the tunes for the motion picture Lost Horizon. However, the film was panned by the critics, and in the fallout, the songwriting duo decided to terminate their working relationship. The break-up left Warwick devoid of their services as her producers and songwriters. She was contractually obligated to fulfill her contract with Warner without Bacharach and David, and she would team with a variety of producers during her tenure with the label.

Faced with the prospect of being sued by Warner Bros. Records due to the breakup of Bacharach/David and their failure to honor their contract with Warwick, she filed a $5.5 million lawsuit against her former partners for breach of contract. The suit was settled out of court in 1979 for $5 million, including the rights to all Warwick recordings produced by Bacharach and David.

Also in 1971, Warwick had her name changed to "Warwicke" per the advice of Linda Goodman, an astrologer friend, who believed it would bring greater success. A few years later, she reverted to the old spelling after a string of disappointments and an absence from the Billboard top 40.

=== Warner era (1972–1978) ===
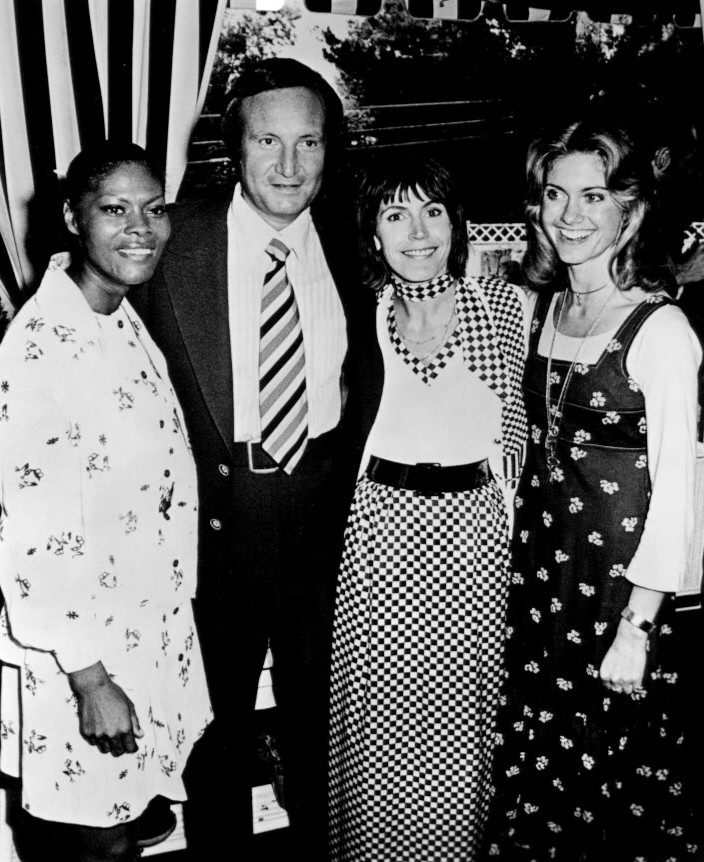
From left to right: Warwick, Don Kirshner, Helen Reddy and Olivia Newton-John in 1974

Without the guidance and songwriting that Bacharach/David had provided, Warwick's career stalled in the early 1970s although she remained a top concert draw throughout the world. There were no big hits during the early and mid part of the decade, aside from 1974's "Then Came You", recorded as a duet with the Spinners and produced by Thom Bell.

Bell later noted, "Dionne made a (strange) face when we finished [the song]. She didn't like it much, but I knew we had something. So we ripped a dollar in two, signed each half and exchanged them. I told her, 'If it doesn't go number one, I'll send you my half.' When it took off, Dionne sent hers back. There was an apology on it."

It hit number one on the Billboard Hot 100 on October 26, 1974, becoming the first number one hit for both Warwick, aged 33, and the Spinners. Since "Then Came You" was issued on the Spinners' label Atlantic, none of Warwick's releases on Warner made the top 40.

During her Warner tenure, Warwick released five albums, all of which failed to replicate her success on Scepter. Warwick left Warner in 1977. Less than a year later, she eventually agreed to sign with Clive Davis's Arista Records after Davis promised to revive her flagging career after the singer told him she was seeking retirement from show business.

=== Renewed success with Arista (1979–1989) ===
Produced by Barry Manilow, Warwick released the album, Dionne in May 1979. The album was a success spawning the hit singles "I'll Never Love This Way Again" and "Deja Vu", both of which topped the Adult Contemporary chart and reached the top twenty of the Billboard Hot 100, with the former song peaking at number five on the latter chart, her first top ten pop hit in nearly a decade and went gold. The Dionne album as a result became her first platinum-certified recording.

At the 22nd Annual Grammy Awards in February 1980, Warwick made history when she became the first female solo artist to win the Grammy Awards for Best Female Pop Vocal Performance for "I'll Never Love This Way Again" and Best Female R&B Vocal Performance for "Deja Vu" in the same year. Her 1980 release, No Night So Long, had a hit with the number one AC hit title track and went gold upon its release.

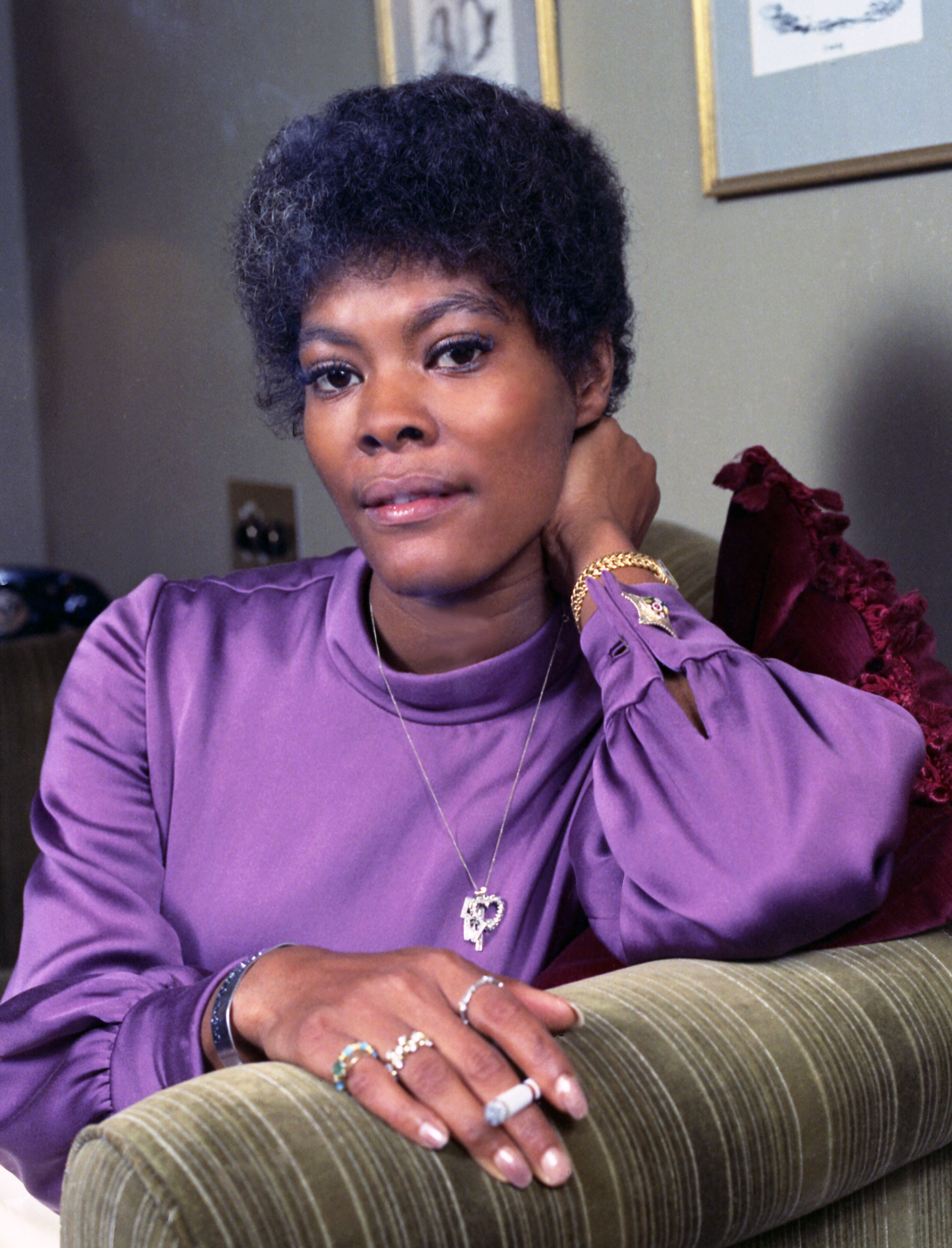
Dionne Warwick by Allan Warren, c. 1980s

In January 1980, while under contract to Arista Records, Warwick hosted a two-hour TV special called Solid Gold '79. This was adapted into the weekly one-hour show Solid Gold, which she hosted throughout 1980 and 1981 and again in 1985–86. Major highlights of each show were the duets she performed with her co-hosts, which often included some of Warwick's hits and her co-hosts' hits, intermingled and arranged by Solid Gold musical director Michael Miller. Another highlight in each show was Warwick's vocal rendition of the Solid Gold theme, composed by Miller (with lyrics by Dean Pitchford).

After a brief appearance in the top forty in early 1982 with Johnny Mathis on "Friends in Love" from the album of the same name, Warwick's next hit later that same year was her full-length collaboration with Barry Gibb of the Bee Gees for the album Heartbreaker. The project came about when Clive Davis was attending his aunt's wedding in Orlando, Florida in early 1982 and spoke with Barry Gibb. Gibb mentioned that he had always been a fan of Warwick's, and Davis arranged for them to meet and discuss a project. Gibb had just had tremendous success writing and co-producing a smash hit album for Barbra Streisand (1980's Guilty), which prompted Davis to suggest they do something similar for Warwick. Both the album and the title single were released in October 1982 to massive success. Warwick later stated to Wesley Hyatt in his Billboard Book of Number One Adult Contemporary Hits that she was not initially fond of "Heartbreaker" but recorded the song because she trusted Barry's judgment that it would be a hit. The song did indeed become one of Warwick's biggest international hits, returning her to the top 10 of the Billboard Hot 100 as well as No. 1 Adult Contemporary and No. 2 in both the UK and Australia. The song was also a top-10 hit throughout continental Europe, Japan, South Africa, Canada and Asia. The album ended up selling three million copies internationally and earned Warwick a gold record in the US. In the UK, Heartbreaker became Warwick's most successful album, peaking at No. 3 and was certified platinum, while both the hit title track and follow-up single "All the Love in the World" (another UK top ten hit) would both be certified silver, becoming her biggest selling singles there.

In 1983, Warwick released How Many Times Can We Say Goodbye, produced by Luther Vandross. The album's most successful single was the title track, "How Many Times Can We Say Goodbye", a Warwick/Vandross duet, which peaked at No. 27 on the 'Hot 100. It also became a top ten hit on the AC and R&B charts. The album Finder of Lost Loves followed in 1984 and reunited her with both Barry Manilow and Burt Bacharach, who was writing with his then current lyricist partner and wife, Carole Bayer Sager. In 1985, Warwick contributed her voice to the multi-Grammy Award winning charity song "We Are the World", along with vocalists like Michael Jackson, Diana Ross, and Ray Charles. The song spent four consecutive weeks at No. 1 on the Billboard Hot 100. It was the year's biggest hit, certified four times platinum in the United States alone.

In 1985, Warwick and Bacharach once again collaborated on the song "That's What Friends Are For". This period was the first time they had worked together since the 1970s, when Warwick felt abandoned by Bacharach and Hal David dissolving their partnership. Warwick said of their reconciliation:

We realized we were more than just friends. We were family. Time has a way of giving people the opportunity to grow and understand ... Working with Burt is not a bit different from how it used to be. He expects me to deliver and I can. He knows what I'm going to do before I do it, and the same with me. That's how intertwined we've been.

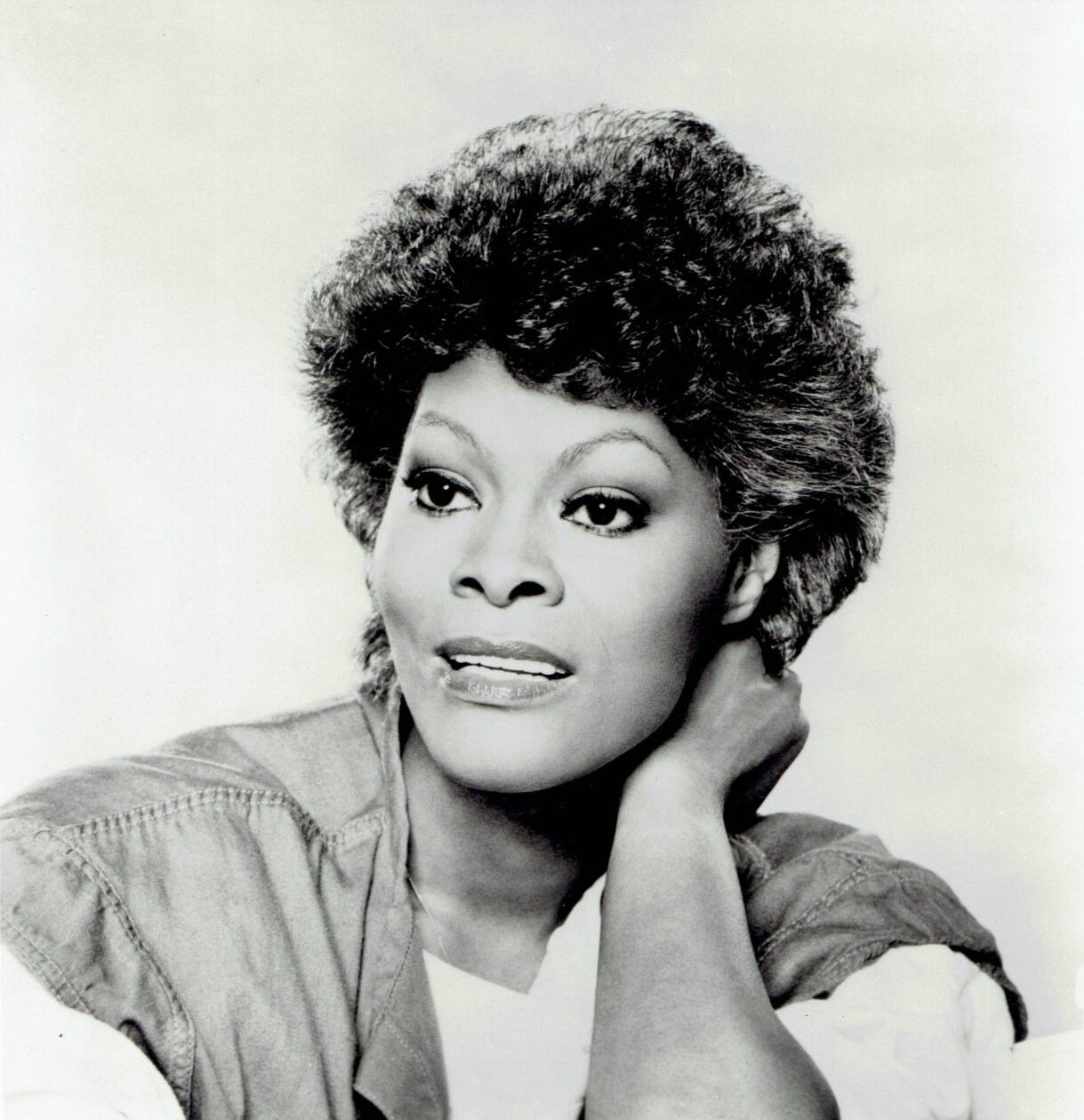
Warwick in 1986

Warwick recorded "That's What Friends Are For" as a benefit single for the American Foundation for AIDS Research (AmFAR) alongside Gladys Knight, Elton John and Stevie Wonder in 1985. The single, credited to "Dionne and Friends", was released in October and eventually raised more than three million dollars for that cause. The tune was a triple crown number one single, topping the R&B, AC and Hot 100, staying atop the lattermost chart at four weeks in early 1986, selling close to two million copies in the US alone.

"Working against AIDS, especially after years of raising money for work on many blood-related diseases such as sickle-cell anemia, seemed the right thing to do. You have to be granite not to want to help people with AIDS, because the devastation that it causes is so painful to see. I was so hurt to see my friend die with such agony", Warwick told The Washington Post in 1988. "I am tired of hurting and it does hurt." The single won the performers the NARAS Grammy Award for Best Pop Performance by a Duo or Group with Vocal, as well as Song of the Year for its writers, Bacharach and Bayer Sager. It also was ranked by Billboard magazine as the most popular song of 1986. With this single, Warwick also released her most successful album of the 1980s, titled Friends, which reached No. 12 on the Billboard albums chart. In 1987, Dionne Warwick won the Special Recognition Award at the American Music Awards for "That's What Friends Are For".

In 1987, Warwick scored another hit with "Love Power". Her eighth career No. 1 Adult Contemporary hit, it also reached No. 5 on the R&B chart and No. 12 on the Billboard Hot 100. A duet with Jeffrey Osborne, it was also written by Burt Bacharach and Carole Bayer Sager, and it was featured on Warwick's album Reservations for Two. The album's title song, a duet with Kashif, was also a chart hit. Other artists featured on the album included Smokey Robinson and June Pointer.

=== Psychic Friends and decline (1990-2000) ===
In 1990, Warwick recorded the song "It's All Over" with former member of Modern Talking Dieter Bohlen (Blue System). The single peaked at No. 60 (No. 33 airplay) on the German pop chart and it was covered on Blue System's album Déjà Vu.

Starting in 1991, Warwick hosted infomercials for the Psychic Friends Network, which featured self-described psychic Linda Georgian. The 900 number psychic service was active from 1991 to 1998. According to press statements throughout the 1990s, the program was the most successful infomercial for several years and Warwick earned in excess of three million dollars per year as spokesperson for the network. In 1998, Inphomation, the corporation owning the network, filed for bankruptcy and Warwick ended her association with the organization.

Warwick's most publicized album during this period was 1993's Friends Can Be Lovers, which was produced in part by Ian Devaney and Lisa Stansfield. Featured on the album was "Sunny Weather Lover", which was the first song that Burt Bacharach and Hal David had written together for Warwick since 1972. It was Warwick's lead single in the United States, and was heavily promoted by Arista, but failed to chart. A follow-up "Where My Lips Have Been" peaked at No. 95 on the Hot R&B/Hip-Hop Singles & Tracks. The 1994 Aquarela Do Brasil album marked the end of Warwick's contract with Arista Records after a 16-year association.

In 1993, Forrest Sawyer, host of the ABC news/entertainment program Day One, alleged financial improprieties by the Warwick Foundation, founded in 1989 to benefit AIDS patients, and particularly Warwick's charity concert performances organized to benefit the organization as "America's Ambassador of Health". The network news magazine story, "That's What Friends Are For", reported that the Warwick Foundation was operating at more than 90% administrative cost, donating only about 3% of the money it raised to AIDS groups. Several AIDS groups and nonprofit experts criticized her foundation, including an AIDS group in the Virgin Islands that claimed she nearly bankrupted them after extravagant expenses left nothing for local charities. ABC reported that Warwick flew first class and was accommodated at first-class hotels for charity concerts and events in which she participated for the Warwick Foundation, managed by her close confidante, Guy Draper, a former chief of protocol for former Washington DC Mayor Marion Barry, and who had a history of bankruptcies. Warwick alleged that the ABC report was racially motivated and threatened to sue ABC News for defamation, although a suit was never filed. The Internal Revenue Service began an investigation of the Warwick Foundation after other complaints were filed, and the Warwick Foundation was later dissolved. ABC's story was nominated for a national Emmy award in 1994 and won a prestigious Investigative Reporters and Editors national television award in 1993.

=== My Favorite Time of the Year and move to Concord Records (2000–2010) ===
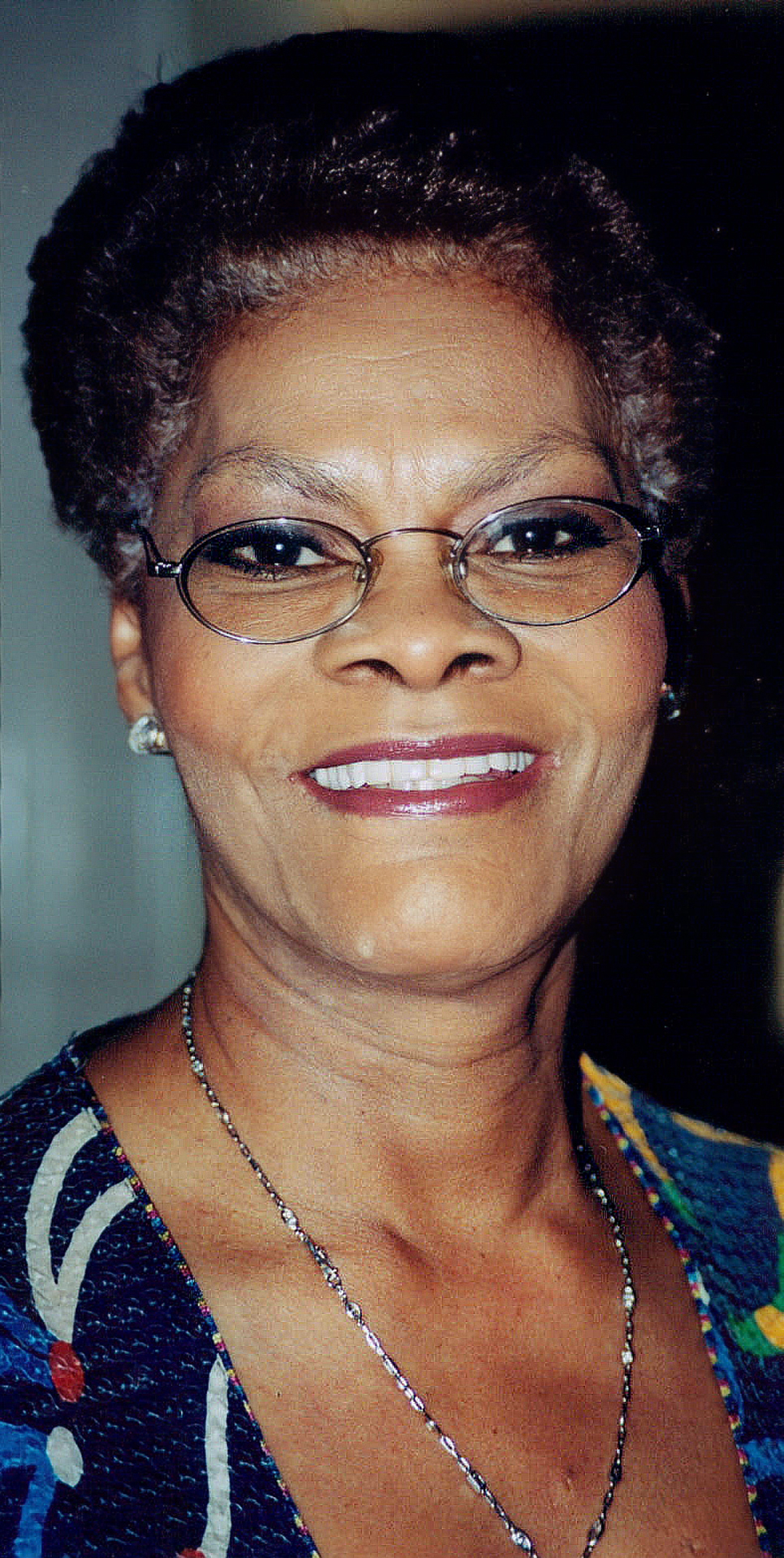
Warwick in 2002

On October 16, 2002, Warwick was nominated to be Goodwill Ambassador of the Food and Agriculture Organization of the United Nations (FAO).

In 2004, Warwick's first Christmas album was released. Entitled My Favorite Time of the Year, the CD featured jazzy interpretations of many holiday classics. In 2007, Rhino Records re-released the CD with new cover art.

In 2005, Warwick was honored by Oprah Winfrey at her Legends Ball. She appeared on the May 24, 2006, fifth-season finale of American Idol. Warwick sang a medley of "Walk On By" and "That's What Friends Are For", with longtime collaborator Burt Bacharach accompanying her on the piano.

In 2006, Warwick signed with Concord Records, her first mainstream label since leaving Arista in 1994. Her first and only release for the label was My Friends and Me, a duets album containing reworkings of her old hits, very similar to her CD Dionne Sings Dionne (1998). Among her singing partners were Gloria Estefan, Olivia Newton-John, Wynonna Judd and Reba McEntire. The album peaked at No. 66 on the Top R&B/Hip-Hop Albums chart. The album was produced by her son Damon Elliott. A follow-up album featuring Warwick's old hits as duets with male vocalists was planned, but the project was cancelled. The relationship with Concord concluded with the release of My Friends and Me. A compilation CD of her greatest hits and love songs, The Love Collection, entered the UK album chart at number 27 on February 16, 2008.

Warwick's second gospel album, Why We Sing, was released on February 26, 2008, in the United Kingdom and on April 1, 2008, in the United States. The album features guest spots by her sister Dee Dee Warwick and BeBe Winans. It would be Warwick's last collaboration with her sister Dee Dee, who died later on October 18 of that year at a nursing home in Essex County, New Jersey. She had been in failing health for several months.

On November 24, 2008, Warwick was the star performer on Divas II, a UK ITV1 special show that also featured Rihanna, Leona Lewis, the Sugababes, Pink, Gabriella Climi and Anastacia. Around this period, Warwick began recording an album of songs from the Sammy Cahn and Jack Wolf songbooks. The finished recording, entitled Only Trust Your Heart, was released in 2011.

On October 20, 2009, Starlight Children's Foundation and New Gold Music Ltd. released a song that Warwick had recorded about ten years prior called "Starlight". The lyrics were written by Dean Pitchford, prolific writer of Fame, screenwriter of – and sole or joint lyricist of every song in the soundtrack of – the original movie Footloose (1984), and lyricist of the Solid Gold theme. The music had been composed by Bill Goldstein, whose versatile career included the original music for NBC's Fame TV series. Warwick, Pitchford and Goldstein announced that they would be donating 100% of their royalties to Starlight Children's Foundation, to support Starlight's mission to help seriously ill children and their families cope with pain, fear and isolation through entertainment, education and family activities.

When Bill and Dean brought this song to me, I instantly felt connected to its message of shining a little light into the lives of people who need it most", said Warwick. "I admire the work of Starlight Children's Foundation and know that if the song brings hope to even just one sick child, we have succeeded.

=== Only Trust Your Heart and Grammy Award (2010–2019) ===
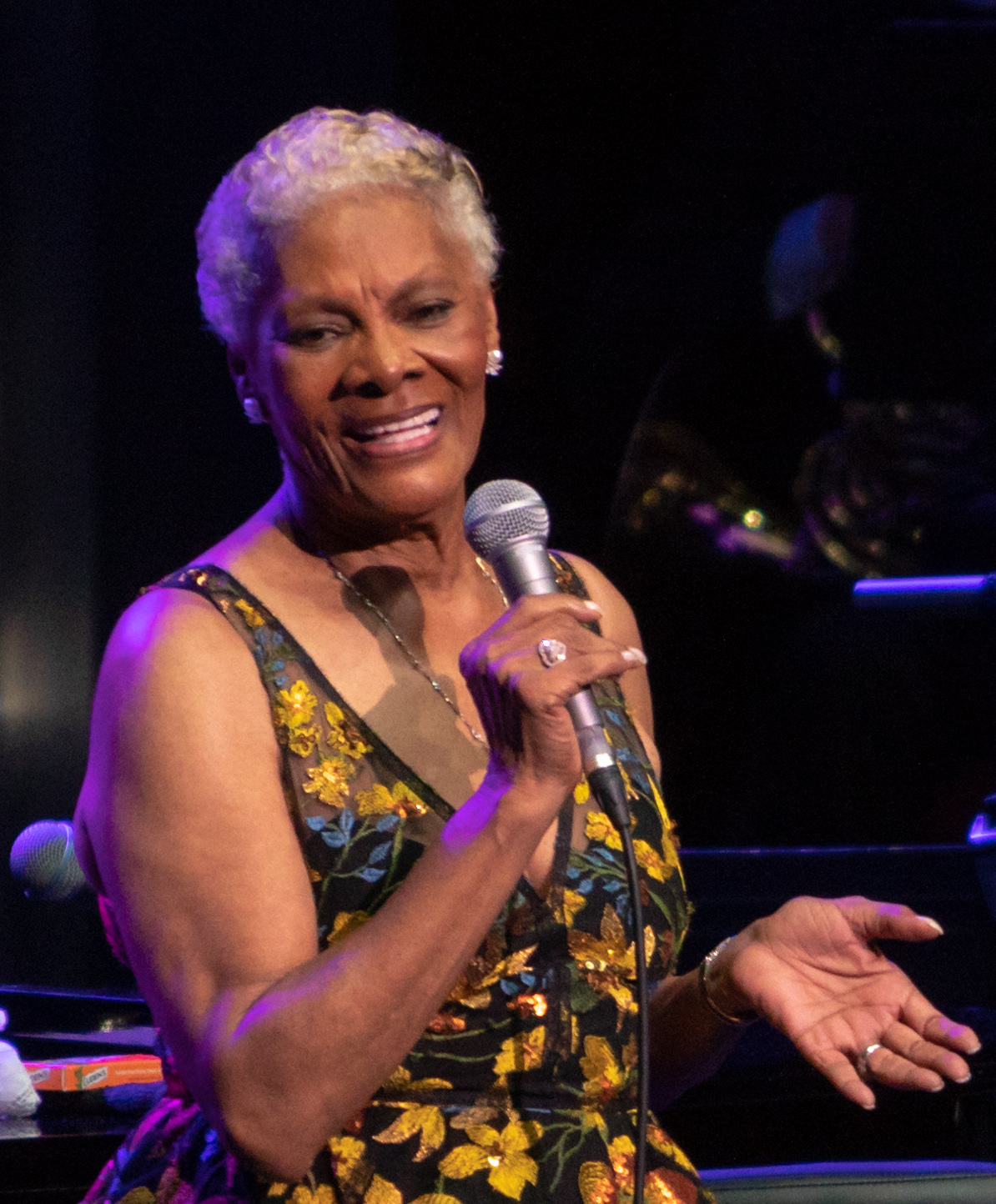
Warwick performing in September 2018

In 2011, the New Jazz style CD Only Trust Your Heart was released, featuring many Sammy Cahn songs. In March 2011, Warwick appeared on The Celebrity Apprentice 4. Her charity was the Hunger Project. She was dismissed from her "apprenticeship" to Donald Trump during the fourth task of the season. In February 2012, Warwick performed "Walk On By" on The Jonathan Ross Show. She also received the Goldene Kamera Musical Lifetime Achievement Award in Germany, and performed "That's What Friends Are For" at the ceremony.

On May 28, 2012, Warwick headlined the World Hunger Day concert at London's Royal Albert Hall. She sang "One World One Song", specially written for the Hunger Project by Tony Hatch and Tim Holder and was joined by Joe McElderry, the London Community Gospel Choir and a choir from Woodbridge School, Woodbridge, Suffolk.

In 2012, the 50th anniversary CD entitled NOW was released; Warwick recorded 12 Bacharach/David tracks produced by Phil Ramone.

On September 19, 2013, she collaborated with country singer Billy Ray Cyrus for his song "Hope Is Just Ahead".

In 2014, the duets album Feels So Good was released. Funkytowngrooves re-issued the remastered Arista albums No Night So Long, How Many Times Can We Say Goodbye ("So Amazing"), and Finder of Lost Loves ("Without Your Love"), all expanded with bonus material.

In December 2015, Warwick's website released the Tropical Love EP with five tracks previously unreleased from the Aquarel Do Brasil Sessions in 1994 – To Say Goodbye (Pra Dizer Adeus) with Edu Lobo – Love Me – Lullaby – Bridges (Travessia) – Rainy Day Girl with Ivan Lins.

A Heartbreaker two-disc expanded edition was planned for a 2016 release by Funkytowngrooves, which would include the original Heartbreaker album and up to 15 bonus tracks consisting of a mixture of unreleased songs, alternate takes, and instrumentals, with more remastered and expanded Arista albums to follow. In 2016, she was inducted into the Rhythm & Blues Hall of Fame.

In 2017, she performed a benefit in Chicago for the Center on Halsted, an organization that contributes to the LGBTQ community. This event was co-chaired by Rahm Emanuel and Barack Obama. Also that year, she made a cameo appearance in the Christian drama Let There Be Light directed by Kevin Sorbo.

In 2019 she was awarded the Grammy Lifetime Achievement Award.

=== Documentary and The Masked Singer (2020–present) ===
Dionne Warwick performing "Peace Like A River" with Dolly Parton, 2023

In 2020, she appeared as "Mouse" on the third season of The Masked Singer. She was eliminated in the fifth round, but came back during the first part of the season three finale to sing "What the World Needs Now Is Love" with the finalists Night Angel, Frog and Turtle as a tribute to the healthcare workers working on the front lines during the coronavirus pandemic. This performance was created after the season wrapped production in March. Warwick made a guest appearance during Gladys Knight's and Patti Labelle's Verzuz battle. Together they performed Warwick's song, "That's What Friends Are For". They closed with their collaborative song "Superwoman".

In My Life, as I See It: An Autobiography, Warwick lists her honorary doctorate from Hartt among those awarded by six other institutions: Hartt College, Bethune-Cookman University, Shaw University, Columbia College of Chicago, Lincoln College, Illinois [May 2010, Doctor of Arts (hon.)], and University of Maryland Eastern Shore.

On February 10, 2021, Dionne was nominated for inclusion in the Rock and Roll Hall of Fame for the first time.

On December 3, 2021, Dionne was honored with a star on the Palm Springs Walk of Stars.

Warwick appears in a documentary revolving around her life and career, Dionne Warwick: Don't Make Me Over, which had its world premiere at the Toronto International Film Festival in September 2021. Organizers of the Toronto Film Festival announced that she would be honored in the upcoming event as a music icon. On November 26, 2021, Warwick released the single "Nothing's Impossible" a duet featuring Chance the Rapper. Two charities are being supported by the duet: SocialWorks, a Chicago-based nonprofit that Chance founded to empower the youth through the arts, education and civic engagement, and Hunger: Not Impossible, a text-based service connecting kids and their families in need with prepaid, nutritious, to-go meals from local restaurants. On January 1, 2023, the documentary premiered on national television on CNN.

In December 2023, Warwick participated in the fifth series of The Masked Singer UK as "Weather". She was eliminated and unmasked on the first episode.

On April 26, 2024, Warwick along with the vocal group the Chi-Lites, were inducted into The Atlantic City Walk of Fame. Producer, writer and director Dave Wooley was the presenter for Warwick. The induction ceremony was held at Brighton Park in Atlantic City, NJ.

In 2024, Warwick was selected for induction into the Rock and Roll Hall of Fame in the musical excellence category. She also competed on episode of Celebrity Wheel of Fortune.

== Voice and artistry ==
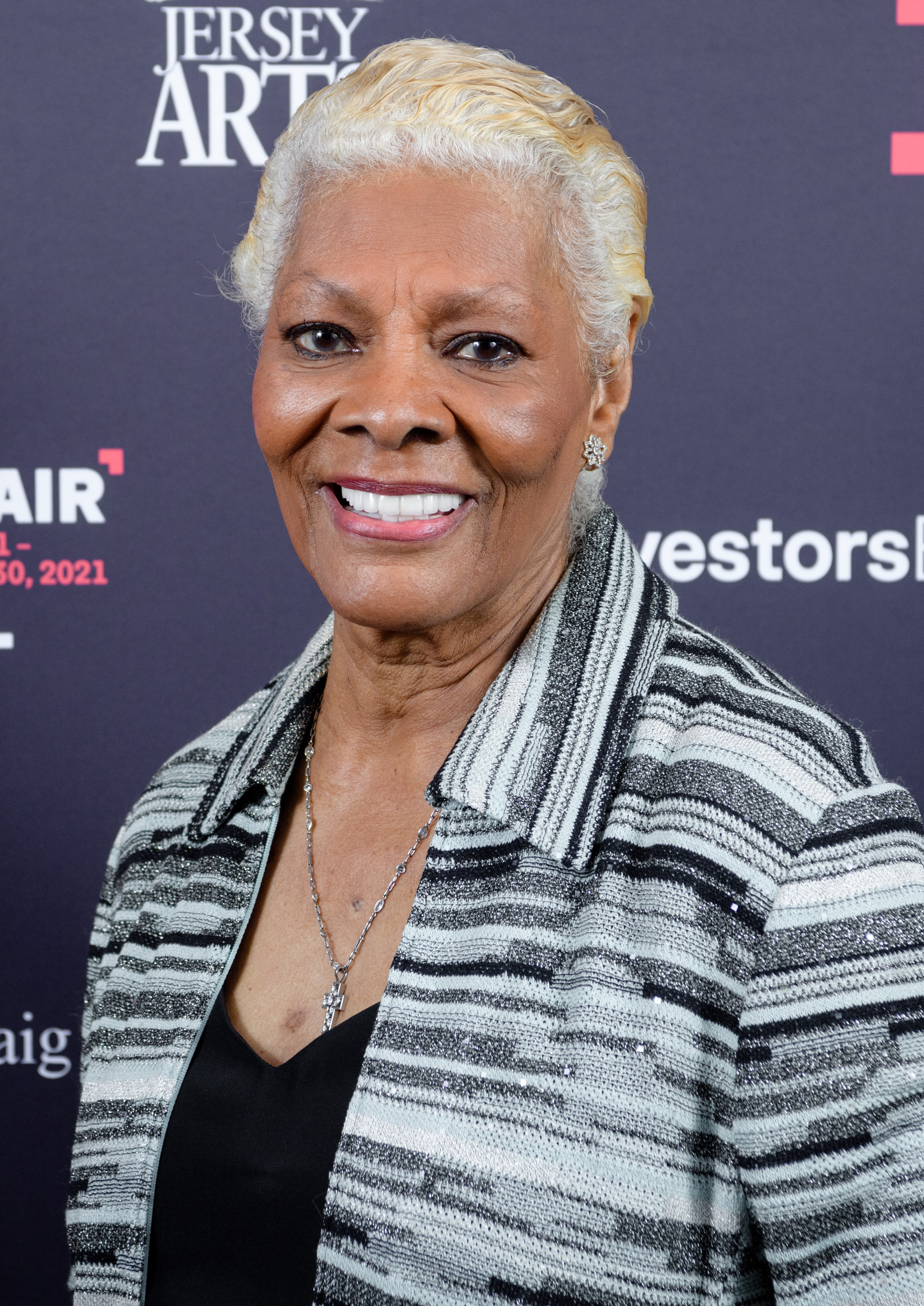
Warwick in 2021

Warwick is a contralto, particularly known for her signature musicality and "husky" singing voice. The New Yorker theatre critic Hilton Als reported that, early in her singing career, Warwick's wide vocal range "allowed her both to sing contralto low notes and to soar as a soprano". According to Mike Joyce of The Washington Post, some performances on Warwick's album Dionne Warwick Sings Cole Porter (1990) capture her warmth "and emphasize her subtle phrasing". In a separate review published in 1982, Joyce noted that Warwick's "magical" voice still manages to be "opaque, elusive, elegant" simultaneously, even when performing what he described as some of her most banal material in her discography. Reviewing a concert in 1983, The New York Times music critic Stephen Holden observed that Warwick's voice had deepened "into a near-baritone at its bottom end", resulting in "an ever-more fascinating vocal personality". Similarly, in 2006, Sarah Dempster of The Guardian observed that Warwick's voice "has deepened with age, lending a splendidly full-bodied finish to everything".

Music critics have described Warwick as the muse of songwriters Burt Bacharach and Hal David's, a term Bacharach himself has used to refer to the singer. Bacharach confirmed that they considered Warwick their "main artist", to whom they allowed first priority on new songs. MTV contributor Carol Cooper said Warwick's interpretation of their songs "established Warwick as the eloquent voice of wounded feminine pride", crediting her with making their material "even more unique and compelling". According to Michael Musto of The Village Voice, the singer's voice proved to be "the perfect venue for Bacharach-David hits", writing, "Dionne could do sultry, pained, wispy, and regretful, all with sophisticated phrasings that made her a vocal emblem for the '60s heartbeat". The singer claims she did not find their material difficult to sing because they had been written specifically for her voice. Cooper identified their partnership as a precedent to the collaborations between R&B singer Toni Braxton, and songwriters Babyface and Diane Warren.

Musically, The New York Times music critic Stephen Holden and The Guardian's Ian Gittins described Warwick as a pop soul singer. However, AllMusic biographer William Ruhlmann found the singer particularly difficult to categorize as a vocalist, writing, "Although Warwick grew up singing in church, she is not a gospel singer. Ella Fitzgerald and Sarah Vaughan are clear influences, but she is not a jazz singer. R&B is also part of her background, yet she is not really a soul singer, either, at least not in the sense that Aretha Franklin is". Similarly, another AllMusic reviewer, Steve Leggett, believes Warwick combines elements of jazz, soul, R&B and gospel, which ultimately results in her being a "pure pop singer". The Washington Informer senior editor D. Kevin McNeir reported that Warwick's delivery and stage presence are often described as "scintillating, soothing, sensual and soulful". A writer for the South Bend Tribune observed that Warwick is usually described as a "sophisticated" singer, while noting that this term "doesn't place her in a specific musical category". A writer for The Guardian described Warwick as "one of the greatest pop singers of all time", while Mikael Wood of the Los Angeles Times named her "that one-of-a-kind instrument that defined pop sophistication in the mid-1960s".

In recent years, Warwick has become known for sharing candid, straightforward opinions about various topics on the social media platform Twitter, being nicknamed the "Queen of Twitter" by several media publications.

== Legacy ==
As a black female contemporary artist during the 1960s, Warwick broke racial barriers by being a frequent presence on the Billboard and Cash Box top 40 between 1962 and 1971. Several of her hits in that era were also internationally successful and inspired cover versions by various artists, namely Cilla Black, Dusty Springfield and Aretha Franklin.

Prior to Warwick's debut with "Don't Make Me Over" in November 1962, few African American female artists charted on the pop charts, with the most notable artist to do so being Dinah Washington. Due to her not fitting the tradition of many rhythm and blues artists of her era, Warwick is sometimes referred to as the "first black female pop star".

In addition, Warwick was acknowledged for "bridging the worlds of pop, R&B and jazz" in her most popular recordings.

== Personal life ==
In 1966, Warwick married actor and drummer William Elliott; they divorced in May 1967. They reconciled and were remarried in Milan, Italy, in August 1967. On January 18, 1969, while living in East Orange, New Jersey, she gave birth to her first son, David Elliott. In 1973, her second son, Damon Elliott, was born. On May 30, 1975, the couple separated, and Warwick was granted a divorce in December 1975 in Los Angeles. The court denied Elliott's request for $2,000 a month (equivalent to $12,000 in 2025) in support pending a community property trial, and his request for $5,000 a month after he insisted that his monthly income was just $500, compared to Warwick's $100,000 (equivalent to $598,000 in 2025). Warwick stated, "I was the breadwinner. The male ego is a fragile thing. It's hard when the woman is the breadwinner. All my life, the only man who ever took care of me financially was my father. I have always taken care of myself."

In 2002, Warwick was arrested at Miami International Airport for possession of marijuana. It was discovered that she had 11 suspected marijuana cigarettes inside her carry-on luggage, hidden in a lipstick container. She was charged with possessing marijuana totaling less than five grams. In 2009, Warwick had a $2.2 million federal tax lien filed against her. The IRS eventually discovered that a large portion of the lien was due to an accounting error and revoked $1.2 million in 2012.

In 1993, her older son, David, a former Los Angeles police officer, co-wrote with Terry Steele the Warwick–Whitney Houston duet "Love Will Find a Way", featured on Warwick's album Friends Can Be Lovers. Since 2002, he has periodically toured with and performed duets with his mother (along with being the drummer of her touring band), and had his acting debut in the film Ali as the singer Sam Cooke. David became a singer-songwriter, with Luther Vandross's "Here and Now" among other credits.

Warwick's second son, Damon, is a music producer who has worked with Mýa, Pink, Christina Aguilera and Keyshia Cole. He arranged and produced his mother's 2006 Concord release My Friends and Me. Warwick received a 2014 Grammy Award nomination in the Traditional Pop Category for her 2013 album release, Now.

On January 24, 2015, Warwick was hospitalized after a fall in the shower at her home. After ankle surgery, she was discharged from the hospital.

=== Bankruptcy ===
Warwick declared Chapter 7 bankruptcy in New Jersey on March 21, 2013. Due to the reported mismanagement of her business affairs, she listed liabilities that included nearly $7 million owed to the Internal Revenue Service for the years 1991 through 1999 and more than $3 million in business taxes owed to the state of California. Unable to work out an agreement with tax officials, she and her attorney decided that declaring bankruptcy would be the best course of action.

=== Relations ===
Warwick's sister, Dee Dee Warwick, also had a successful singing career, scoring several notable R&B hits in the US, including the original version of "I'm Gonna Make You Love Me". Dee Dee recorded the original version of the song "You're No Good", which later became a 1963 No. 5 R&B hit for Betty Everett, a 1964 No. 3 UK hit for the Swinging Blue Jeans and a 1975 No. 1 pop hit for Linda Ronstadt. In 1966, the Swinging Blue Jeans had a No. 31 UK hit with a cover of Dionne's "Don't Make Me Over", thus appearing in the UK Singles Chart with covers of songs from both Warwick sisters.

Warwick's maternal aunt is gospel-trained vocalist Cissy Houston, mother of Warwick's cousin, the late singer Whitney Houston.

In her 2011 autobiography, My Life, as I See It, Warwick notes that opera diva Leontyne Price is a maternal cousin.

== Discography ==
Studio albums

- Presenting Dionne Warwick (1963)
- Anyone Who Had a Heart (1964)
- Make Way for Dionne Warwick (1964)
- The Sensitive Sound of Dionne Warwick (1965)
- Here I Am (1965)
- Here Where There Is Love (1966)
- On Stage and in the Movies (1967)
- The Windows of the World (1967)
- Dionne Warwick in Valley of the Dolls (1968)
- The Magic of Believing (with the Drinkard Singers) (1968)
- Promises, Promises (1968)
- Soulful (1969)
- I'll Never Fall in Love Again (1970)
- Very Dionne (1970)
- Dionne (1972)
- Just Being Myself (1973)
- Then Came You (1975)
- Track of the Cat (1975)
- Love at First Sight (1977)
- Dionne (1979)
- No Night So Long (1980)
- Friends in Love (1982)
- Heartbreaker (1982)
- How Many Times Can We Say Goodbye (1983)
- Finder of Lost Loves (1985)
- Friends (1985)
- Reservations for Two (1987)
- Dionne Warwick Sings Cole Porter (1990)
- Friends Can Be Lovers (1993)
- Aquarela do Brasil (1994)
- Dionne Sings Dionne (1998)
- Dionne Sings Dionne, Vol. 2 (2000)
- My Favorite Time of the Year (2004)
- My Friends & Me (2006)
- Why We Sing (2008)
- Only Trust Your Heart (2011)
- Now (2012)
- Feels So Good (2014)
- She's Back (2019)
- Dionne Warwick & the Voices of Christmas (2019)

== Tours ==
- Dionne Warwick Tour (1966)
- Dionne: 40 Anniversary Tour (2002)
- Soul Divas Tour (2004)
- An Evening with Dionne (2007)
- She's Back: One Last Time (2022)

== Awards and honors ==
In addition to numerous awards and honors, the Miami-Dade Chamber of Commerce has declared May 25 to be Dionne Warwick Day and Lincoln Elementary School in East Orange, New Jersey, honoring her by renaming it to the Dionne Warwick Institute of Economics and Entrepreneurship.

On Friday, October 11, 2024, Warwick was honored by the City of East Orange, NJ with a street renaming ceremony. North Arlington Avenue at City Hall Plaza was given the name "Dionne Warwick Way". The ceremony included a tribute concert by hundreds of children. The ceremony was also attended by her two sons and Clive Davis, the notable music producer. Reported by CBS News.

=== Awards ===
Year	Nominated work	Association	Category	Result	Ref.
1965	"Walk On By"	Grammy Award	Best Rhythm & Blues Recording	Nominated	
1968	"Alfie"	Grammy Award	Best Vocal Performance, Female	Nominated	
1968	"I Say a Little Prayer"	Grammy Award	Best Contemporary Female Solo Vocal Performance	Nominated	
1969	"Do You Know the Way to San Jose"	Grammy Award	Best Contemporary Pop Vocal Performance, Female	Won	
1969	Slaves	Cannes Film Festival	Palme d'Or	Nominated	
1970	"This Girl's in Love with You"	Grammy Award	Best Contemporary Vocal Performance, Female	Nominated	
1971	I'll Never Fall in Love Again	Grammy Award	Best Contemporary Vocal Performance, Female	Won	
1975	"Then Came You" (with the Spinners)	Grammy Award	Best Pop Vocal Performance by a Duo, Group or Chorus	Nominated	
1975	Dionne Warwick	People's Choice Awards	Favorite Female Singer	Won	
1980	"I'll Never Love This Way Again"	Grammy Award	Best Pop Vocal Performance, Female	Won	
1980	"Déjà Vu"	Grammy Award	Best R&B Vocal Performance, Female	Won	
1980	Dionne Warwick	NAACP Image Award	Outstanding Female Artist	Won	
1986	Dionne Warwick	NAACP Image Award	Entertainer of the Year	Won	
1987	"That's What Friends Are For" (with Elton John, Gladys Knight & Stevie Wonder)	Grammy Award	Best Pop Performance by a Duo or Group with Vocal	Won	
1987	"That's What Friends Are For" (with Elton John, Gladys Knight & Stevie Wonder)	Grammy Award	Record of the Year	Nominated	
1987	"That's What Friends Are For" (with Elton John, Gladys Knight & Stevie Wonder)	American Music Awards	Special Recognition Award	Won	
1987	"That's What Friends Are For" (with Elton John, Gladys Knight & Stevie Wonder)	Billboard Music Awards	Single of the Year	Won	
1987	"That's What Friends Are For" (with Elton John, Gladys Knight & Stevie Wonder)	Soul Train Music Awards	Best R&B/Soul Single-Group, Band or Duo	Nominated	
1987	Friends	Grammy Award	Best Pop Vocal Performance, Female	Nominated	
1988	Dionne Warwick	NAACP Image Award	Entertainer of the Year	Won	
1990	Dionne Warwick	NAACP Image Award	Key of Life Award	Won	
1992	"Superwoman" (with Gladys Knight & Patti LaBelle)	Grammy Award	Best R&B Performance by a Duo or Group with Vocal	Nominated	
2009	"Say a little prayer"	NAACP Image Award	Outstanding Literary Work – Children	Nominated	
2013	Dionne Warwick	Soul Train Music Awards	Soul train Legend Award	Won	
2014	Now	Grammy Award	Best Traditional Pop Vocal Album	Nominated	
2019	Dionne Warwick	Grammy Award	Lifetime Achievement Award	Won	

=== Honors ===
Year	Category	Award	Ref.
1964	Songs of the Century: "Walk on By"	RIAA	
1968	Mayors Award and key to the city	San Jose, California	
1985	Songs of the Century: "That's What Friends Are For"	RIAA	
1985	Inductee	Hollywood Walk of Fame	
1987	United States Ambassador of Health	Appointed by Ronald Reagan	
1998	"Walk On By"	Grammy Hall of Fame	
1998	Lifetime Achievement Award	ASCAP Awards	
2000	"Don't Make Me Over"	Grammy Hall of Fame	
2001	Hitmaker Award	National Academy of Popular Music/Songwriters Hall of Fame	
2002	Heroes Award	ASCAP Awards	
2002	Global Ambassador for the Food and Agriculture Organization (FAO)	United Nations	
2003	Lifetime Achievement Award	Rhythm and Blues Foundation	
2006	Lifetime Career Achievement Award	Temecula Valley International Film Festival	
2008	"Alfie"	Grammy Hall of Fame	
2012	Ride of Fame	Gray Line New York	
2012	Living Legend Award	Black Girls Rock!	
2013	Inductee	New Jersey Hall of Fame	
2016	Inductee	National Rhythm & Blues Hall of Fame	
2017	Inductee	Apollo Theater Walk of Fame	
2021	Inductee	Palm Springs Walk of Stars	
2023	Inductee	Kennedy Center Honors	
2024	Inductee	The Atlantic City Walk of Fame	
2024	Inductee	Rock and Roll Hall of Fame	

== Filmography ==
=== Film ===
Year	Title	Role	Notes	Ref.
1968	Dionne Warwick: Don't Make Me Over	Self	Documentary by Gary Keys	
1969	Slaves	Cassy		
1971	The Love Machine	Cameo	Performed main theme	
1977	The Day the Music Died	Self		
1988	Rent-a-Cop	Beth Connors		
2002	The Making and Meaning of We Are Family	Self		
2011	Michael Jackson: The Life of an Icon	Self		
2013	Voices of Love-Featuring Whitney Houston, Dionne Warwick, Cissy Houston & The Drinkard Singers	Self	Documentary by Gary Keys	
2017	Let There Be Light	Self		
2018	Armed	Shirley		
2021	Dionne Warwick: Don't Make Me Over	Self		

=== Television ===
Year	Title	Role	Notes	Ref.
1969	The Merv Griffin Show	Guest Host		
1970	The Name of the Game-I Love You Billy Baker (Part I and Part II)	Marie Currie		
1973	The Midnight Special: Host – Dionne Warwick	Host	NBC	
1975	Music Country USA-Host Dionne Warwick	Host	NBC	
1975	The Dionne Warwick Show		Nationally syndicated	
1976	The Original Rompin' Stompin', Hot & Heavy, Cool & Groovy All-Star Jazz Show	Host	with Count Basie	
1976–1977	Switch	Sherry		
1977	Rockford Files	Theda Moran		
1979	Solid Gold Countdown 1979	Co-Host	with Glen Campbell	
1980–1981 1985–1986	Solid Gold	Host		
1982	To Basie with Love	Host		
1990–1991	Dionne!-(Talk Show)	Host	Nationally Syndicated	
1991	Extralarge-Black and White	Mama Limbo	TV film	
1991	Extralarge-Miami Killer		TV film	
1991	Extralarge-Black Magic		TV film	
1992	Extralarge-Cannonball		TV film	
1992	Captain Planet and the Planeteers	Dr. Russell		
1996–1998	The Wayans Bros.	Mrs. Jackson	2 episodes	
1997	The Drew Carey Show	Cameo	Season 3, Episode 9	
1998	The Bold and the Beautiful	Self	1 Episode	
1999	Johnny Bravo	Self (Voice)	Season 2, Episode 3, "Karma Krisis"	
1999	Happily Ever After: Fairy Tales for Every Child	Miss Kitty		
1999	So Weird	Effy	Season 1, Episode 12 – "Lost"	
2000	Walker, Texas Ranger	Dionne Berry	Season 9, Episode 10, "Faith"	
2001	The Teens Who Stole Popular Music	Self	A & E Films	
2001	Don't Make Me Over: The Dionne Warwick Story	Self	A & E Films	
2011	The Celebrity Apprentice 4	Contestant/Self		
2020	The Masked Singer	The Mouse/Self		
2021	Saturday Night Live	Self		

=== Live performances ===
Year	Title	Notes	Ref.
1963–1968	American Bandstand	8 performances	
1965	The Danny Kaye Show	1 performance	
1966	Live from the Olympia in Paris-Sacha Distel and Dionne Warwick	Radiodiffusion-Télévision Française	
1966–1967	The Red Skelton Show	2 performances	
1967	The 39th Annual Academy Awards –	NBC: Performing Alfie	
1967	Tin Pan Alley Today	NBC Television Network Special – Star	
1967–1968	The Ed Sullivan Show	4 performances	
1968	The Carol Burnett Show	CBS: Performing (Theme from) Valley of the Dolls; Children Go Where I Send Thee	
1968	The Beautiful Phyllis Diller Show	NBC: Performing Promises, Promises and Do You Know the Way to San Jose	
1969	The Jose Feliciano Special	NBC – Performing What the World Needs Now and Alfie with Burt Bacharach	
1969	The Dick Cavett Show	ABC – Multiple performances	
1969	Dionne Warwick: Souled Out	CBS Television with Warwick's guests Burt Bacharach, Creedence Clearwater Revival and Glen Campbell	
1970	The Dean Martin Show	NBC – Performing Paper Mache	
1970	An Evening with Burt Bacharach: Special Guest Dionne Warwick	NBC	
1970	The Carol Burnett Show	CBS: Performing (There's) Always Something There to Remind Me and What the World Needs Now	
1974	The Dionne Warwick Special	Nationally syndicated	
1975	Dionne Warwick Live in Concert		
1975	Dionne Warwick: In Performance at Wolftrap	PBS	
1977	Dionne Warwick with the Edmonton Symphony	PBS	
1978	Dionne Warwick: Live at The Forum		
1978	Dionne Warwick -Live from DC- Dick Clark	ABC	
1980	Dionne Warwick: Live at the Park West	HBO	
1982	Dionne Warwick: Live from Lake Tahoe	HBO	
1982	I Love Liberty	performer	
1983	Dionne Warwick: Live at the Rialto	PBS	
1985	Dionne Warwick: Live at the Royal Albert Hall	ITV	
1986	Sisters in the Name of Love, with Patti LaBelle and Gladys Knight	HBO	
1987	Dionne Warwick: Live in Japan		
1988	Dionne Warwick with the Boston Pops	PBS	
1988	Dionne Warwick: That's What Friends Are For Benefit Concert	HBO	
1988	Dionne Warwick Live in London	BBC	
1989	Dionne Warwick: Live in Australia	ABC	
1989	Dionne Warwick: That's What Friends Are For Benefit Concert	HBO	
1990	Dionne Warwick and Friends: That's What Friends Are For Benefit Concert	HBO	
1995	Dionne Warwick and Burt Bacharach – Live from the Rainbow Room	A & E Network	
2002	A Tribute to Burt Bacharach & Hal David		
2005	Prime Concerts: In Concert with Edmonton Symphony	PBS	
2005	The 5th Dimension Travelling Sunshine Show		
2005	Straight from the Heart Live, Vol. 1		
2006	Flashbacks: Soul Sensations		
2006	Flashbacks: Pop Parade		
2007	Dionne Warwick – Live		
2008	Cabaret: Live in Cabaret July 18, 1975		
2008	Lost Concerts Series: Uptown Divas		

== Sources ==
- Harvey, Stephen: "What's It All About Dionne? Interview", The Independent on Sunday, February 23, 2003
- Ayres, Sabra: Dionne Warwick's Charges Dropped in Plea Bargain, Associated Press, June 5, 2002.
- McCann, Bob (2010). Encyclopedia of African American actresses in film and television. Jefferson, North Carolina: McFarland & Co. ISBN 978-0-7864-3790-0.
- Nathan, David (1999). The Soulful Divas: Personal Portraits of over a dozen divine divas from Nina Simone, Aretha Franklin, & Diana Ross, to Patti LaBelle, Whitney Houston, Mariah Carey, & Janet Jackson. Watson-Guptill Publications. ISBN 0-8230-8425-6.
- Current Biography. H. W. Wilson, Company. Current Biography Yearbook 1969. Subject: Dionne Warwick. 1969. H.W. Wilson Company, Chicago, Ill.
- Current Biography. H. W. Wilson, Company. Current Biography Yearbook 1971. Subject: Burt Bacharach. 1971. H.W. Wilson Company, Chicago, Ill.
- Hitmakers: The Teens Who Stole Popular Music: Dionne Warwick – Don't Make Me Over. Performers – Dionne Warwick main subject, Burt Bacharach, Dee Dee Warwick, Dick Clark, et al. A&E Entertainment Video. 2002.
- Hitmakers: Burt Bacharach. Performers-Burt Bacharach main subject, Dionne Warwick, Angie Dickinson, Steve Lawrence, et al. A&E Entertainment Video. 2002.
- Lifetime Television's Intimate Portrait: Dionne Warwick. Performers: Dionne Warwick, Lee Warrick, David Elliott, Damon Elliott, Cissy Houston, et al. Lifetime Entertainment Video. 2004.
- "Dionne Warwick Profile". People. October 15, 1979. Time-Warner, Inc.
- "Dionne Warwick". Rolling Stone, November 15, 1979. Rolling Stone Press.
- "Dionne the Universal Warwick". Ebony, May 1968. Johnson Publications.
- "The Sound of the Sixties". Time. May 21, 1965. Time, Inc.
- "Spreading the Faith". Time. July 14, 1967. Time, Inc.
- "Dionne Warwick Married". Time. September 8, 1967. Time, Inc.

== Bibliography ==
- Warwick, Dionne (2010). My Life, As I See It. With David Freeman Wooley. Atria Books. ISBN 978-1-4391-7134-9.
