= Hot! Live and Otherwise =

Live album / studio album by Dionne Warwick
- Released: May 20, 1981
- Recorded: 1981
- Venue: Harrah's Casino (Reno, Nevada)
- Studio: Wally Heider Recording and Motown/Hitsville U.S.A. Recording Studios (Los Angeles, California); Evergreen Studios (Burbank, California); United Western Recorders (Hollywood, California); Mastersound Studios (Atlanta, Georgia); Audio Media (Nashville, Tennessee)
- Genre: Pop
- Length: 77:42
- Label: Arista
- Producer: Steve Buckingham; Michael Masser

Dionne Warwick chronology
No Night So Long (1980)	Hot! Live and Otherwise (1981)	Friends in Love (1982)

Singles from Hot! Live and Otherwise
- 1. "Some Changes are Good" Released: June 1981; 2. "Now We're Starting Over Again" Released: August 1981; 3. "There's a Long Road Ahead of Us" Released: 1981

Professional ratings
Review scores
Source	Rating
Allmusic	2/5 stars

Hot! Live and Otherwise is a combination live and in-studio album by American singer Dionne Warwick, released in 1981 on Arista Records. The LP was originally issued as number A2L 8605 in the Arista Catalog.

An extended version of this album is available having been issued on CD in 2007.

== History ==
The live portion of the albums was recorded over several dates at Harrah's Casino in Reno, Nevada in the spring of 1981. The original 2-LP release featured three sides of live recordings, plus a fourth side of studio recordings, including the pop and AC hit "Some Changes Are for Good" and "Now We're Starting Over Again," which later became an Adult Contemporary hit for Natalie Cole in 1989 under the shortened title "Starting Over Again." Three of those studio recordings were produced by Michael Masser and the other two were produced by Steve Buckingham.

The album was reissued on CD in 2007 with new liner notes from David Nathan, a slightly amended track listing (missing the live track "We Never Said Goodbye" and one of the studio tracks "Dedicate This Heart"), and added two previously unissued studio bonus cuts, "When the Good Times Come Again" and "Right Back." The former song was written by Richard Kerr and Will Jennings – the same writing team that provided Warwick with her gold-selling comeback hit, "I'll Never Love This Way Again" in 1979.

== Track listing ==
Side one
No.	Title	Writer(s)	Length
1.	"What You Won't Do for Love" / "In the Stone" (medley)	Bobby Caldwell, Alphonse Kettner / Maurice White, David Foster, Allee Willis	6:53
2.	"Don't Make Me Over"	Burt Bacharach, Hal David	3:04
3.	"Alfie"	Bacharach, David	3:40
4.	"One in a Million You"	Sam Dees	4:30

Side two
No.	Title	Writer(s)	Length
5.	"Hit Record Medley" ("Walk On By / Anyone Who Had a Heart / You'll Never Get to Heaven / A House Is Not a Home / Message to Michael / Trains and Boats and Planes / The Look of Love / Close to You / Do You Know the Way to San Jose / Valley of the Dolls / There's Always Something There to Remind Me / Make It Easy on Yourself / Promises, Promises / What the World Needs Now / Then Came You")	Bacharach, David, André Previn, Phillip Pugh, Sherman Marshall	20:30

Side three
No.	Title	Writer(s)	Length
6.	"Déjà Vu"	Isaac Hayes, Adrienne Anderson	4:40
7.	"Easy Love"	Steve Dorff, Larry Herbstritt, Randy Cate	2:56
8.	"No Night So Long"	Richard Kerr, Will Jennings	3:43
9.	"We Never Said Goodbye"	Hayes, Anderson	3:44
10.	"I'll Never Love This Way Again"	Kerr, Jennings	5:46

Side four
No.	Title	Writer(s)	Length
11.	"There's a Long Road Ahead of Us"	Michael Masser, Gerry Goffin	3:48
12.	"Dedicate This Heart"	Michael McDonald, Paul Anka	4:04
13.	"Some Changes Are for Good"	Masser, Carole Bayer Sager	3:58
14.	"Even a Fool Would Let Go"	Kerry Chater, Tom Snow	3:18
15.	"Now We're Starting Over Again"	Masser, Goffin	3:08

== Personnel ==
- Dionne Warwick – vocals, backing vocals (12, 14)

Musicians (Tracks 1–10)

- Joe Kloess – keyboards, conductor, arrangements (1, 8, 9)
- Stewart Levin – keyboards
- Lee Valentine – guitars
- Ralf Rost – bass
- Mel Lee – drums
- Harold Alexander – percussion
- The John Carlton Orchestra – orchestra
- Larry Wilcox – arrangements (2, 4–7, 10)
- Burt Bacharach – arrangements (3)
- Darlene Love – backing vocals
- Eunice Peterson – backing vocals

Musicians (Tracks 11, 13 & 15)

- Randy Goodrum – Fender Rhodes
- Michael Masser – keyboards, rhythm arrangements
- Tim May – guitars
- Lee Ritenour – guitars
- Leland Sklar – bass
- Rick Shlosser – drums
- Gene Page – string arrangements, rhythm arrangements (11)
- Barry Fasman – rhythm arrangements (13, 15)

Musicians (Tracks 12 & 14)

- Randy McCormack – keyboards, synthesizers
- Steve Buckingham – guitars
- Larry Byrom – guitars
- JayDee Maness – steel guitar
- Tom Robb – bass
- Wade Short – bass
- James Stroud – drums
- Mickey Buckins – percussion
- Jerry Steinholtz – percussion
- Tom Scott – alto saxophone, tenor saxophone, Lyricon solo
- Plas Johnson – alto saxophone, soprano saxophone, tenor saxophone
- Ernie Watts – alto saxophone, soprano saxophone, tenor saxophone
- Dick Nash – trombone
- Chuck Findley – trumpet
- Jerry Hey – trumpet
- Steve Dorff – horn and string arrangements, conductor
- James Getzoff – concertmaster (Los Angeles)
- Sheldon Kurland – concertmaster (Nashville)
- Pat Henderson – additional backing vocals
- Myra Walker – additional backing vocals
- Julia Tillman Waters – additional backing vocals
- Maxine Waters Willard – additional backing vocals

== Production ==
- Steve Buckingham – producer (1–10, 12, 14)
- Michael Masser – producer (11, 13, 15)
- Larry Kelm – music coordinator (1–10, 12, 14)
- Kathy Andrews – production assistant (12, 14)
- Jan Birdwell – production assistant (12, 14)
- Clive Davis – liner notes

Technical credits

- Dick Bogert – engineer (1–11, 13, 15)
- Michael Leitz – engineer (1–11, 13, 15), mixing (11)
- Joe Neil – engineer (1–11, 13, 15), mixing (12, 14)
- Lenny Roberts – engineer (12, 14)
- Russ Terana – mixing (13, 15)
- Ray Dilfield – assistant engineer (1–11, 13, 15)
- Doug Field – assistant engineer (1–11, 13, 15)
- Dennis Mays – assistant engineer (1–11, 13, 15)
- Billy Youdelman – assistant engineer (1–11, 13, 15)
- David Ahlert – assistant engineer (12, 14)
- Chuck Britz – assistant engineer (12, 14)
- Mike Hatcher – assistant engineer (12, 14)
- Pat McMakin – assistant engineer (12, 14)

== Charts ==
Chart performance for Hot! Live and Otherwise
Chart (1981)	Peak position
US Top LPs & Tape (Billboard)	72
US Soul LPs (Billboard)	35
US Top 100 Albums (Cash Box)	81
US Top 75 Black Contemporary Albums (Cash Box)	24
US The Album Chart (Record World)	88
US Black Oriented Album Chart (Record World)	32
