= Melissa Manchester (album) =

Studio album by Melissa Manchester
- Released: October 1979
- Recorded: August–September 1979
- Studio: Web IV (Atlanta, Georgia); Record Plant (Sausalito, California); Davlen Sound Studios (North Hollywood, California); Britannia Studios (Hollywood, California; Sound City Studios (Van Nuys, California)
- Genre: Pop
- Length: 38:26 (Original release); 51:34 (Bonus Track release)
- Label: Arista
- Producer: Steve Buckingham

Melissa Manchester chronology
Don't Cry Out Loud (1978)	Melissa Manchester (1979)	For the Working Girl (1980)

Singles from Pretty Girls
- 1. "Pretty Girls" Released: September 1979; 2. "Fire in the Morning" Released: February 1980

Professional ratings
Review scores
Source	Rating
AllMusic	3/5 stars
Christgau's Record Guide	C−

Melissa Manchester is the eighth album by singer-songwriter Melissa Manchester, released in October 1979 on Arista Records.

== Writing and recording ==
Although it was reported in August 1979 that Manchester was recording a followup to her 1978 release Don't Cry Out Loud with the title cut's producer Harry Maslin at Cherokee Studios, the tracks on the Melissa Manchester album were all recorded at Web IV Studios in Atlanta in September 1979 with local producer Steve Buckingham, who had had massive success with the first single he'd produced: "I Love the Nightlife" by Alicia Bridges. Buckingham recalls that when the success of the Bridges single failed to secure him offers for further production work, he began cold calling record companies, and that Arista Records was the second label he called. As a result, Buckingham met with Arista president Clive Davis in New York City. After four hours of appraising tracks Davis played for him, Buckingham was told, "If you have a hit song, call us." After Buckingham sent Davis the demo for the song "Fire in the Morning", Davis assigned Buckingham to produce Manchester's eighth album.

Following Manchester's 1977 cover album, Singin'..., and the 1978 album, Don't Cry Out Loud, which was mostly original material (despite the Top Ten hit title cut not being written by Manchester), the Melissa Manchester album featured five Manchester originals and five tracks of outside material. The songs written by Manchester included two collaborations with Carole Bayer Sager, who had been Manchester's regular lyricist for over five years: the tracks "It's All in the Sky Above" and "How Does It Feel Right Now". "I Know Your Love Won't Let Me Down" reunited Manchester with lyricist Adrienne Anderson, a regular collaborator in the first phase of Manchester's recording career, while "Lights of Dawn" - written by solely by Manchester - featured a newly written lyric to the tune of a song written and set aside five years before. The Melissa Manchester album also featured Manchester's own version of the Kenny Loggins hit she'd co-written: "Whenever I Call You Friend", which Manchester recorded as a duet with Arnold McCuller.

== Release and promotion ==
Despite the favorable impression the track had made on Davis, "Fire in the Morning" was passed over for lead single with "Pretty Girls" being released three weeks prior in advance of the album. "Pretty Girls" was the first upbeat single to preview a Melissa Manchester album and besides its standard 7-inch 45 issue, the track served as Manchester's extended dance single debut. Although Manchester would have her biggest hit with the dance track "You Should Hear How She Talks About You" in 1982, her first foray into disco music with "Pretty Girls" barely translated into Top 40 success, as the single peaked at #39 on the Billboard Hot 100. "Fire in the Morning" was released as the second single and fared well in the easy listening market which had been the mainstay of Manchester's support. The track - featuring Paul Davis on harmony vocals - reached #8 on the A/C without significantly boosting Manchester's Top 40 profile, as its Hot 100 peak was #32.

Without producing a Top 30 single, the Melissa Manchester album evidenced a drop in the singer's popularity from the precedent Don't Cry Out Loud album, with Melissa Manchester peaking at #63 as opposed to #33. However Manchester would re-team with producer Steve Buckingham for the subsequent For the Working Girl album (1980) before scoring a 1982 comeback with the Hey Ricky album and the #5 single "You Should Hear How She Talks About You" produced by Arif Mardin. Neither of the singles from the Melissa Manchester album was featured on Manchester's 1983 Greatest Hits album, although it did feature the Melissa Manchester track "Whenever I Call You Friend".

The album was one of her most commercial efforts to date, with tracks all designed for radio play. Between the singles Pretty Girls and Fire In The Morning, some FM radio stations picked out other tracks like When We Loved, Don’t Want A Heartache and I Know Your Love Won’t Let Me Down while the beautiful Lights Of Dawn became a favorite of her fans.

The 2007 reissue of the Melissa Manchester album by Wounded Bird Records augmented the original track listing with three bonus tracks: the single mix of "O Heaven (How You've Changed Me)" (which was later re-recorded in a different style for the singer's 1974 album Bright Eyes), "We Had This Time" which was the B-side of the "Don't Cry Out Loud" single, and "Nice Girls" a Steve Buckingham composition introduced on Manchester's 1983 Greatest Hits album ("Nice Girls" had charted at #41).

== Track listing ==
Original LP release
No.	Title	Writer(s)	Length
1.	"Pretty Girls"	Lisa Dalbello	3:50
2.	"Fire in the Morning"	Steve Dorff; Larry Herbstritt; Gary Harju	3:49
3.	"Don't Want a Heartache"	Jason Darrow; Gerard Cohen	3:46
4.	"When We Loved"	Mickey Buckins; Randy McCormick	4:10
5.	"It's All in the Sky Above"	Melissa Manchester; Carole Bayer Sager	4:15
6.	"How Does It Feel Right Now"	Manchester; Sager	3:54
7.	"Whenever I Call You Friend"	Kenny Loggins; Manchester	4:42
8.	"Holdin' On to the Lovin'"	Manchester; Allee Willis; Deniece Williams	3:21
9.	"I Know Your Love Won't Let Me Down"	Manchester; Adrienne Anderson	2:49
10.	"Lights of Dawn"	Manchester	3:29

2007 CD reissue bonus tracks
No.	Title	Writer(s)	Length
11.	"We Had This Time"	Manchester; Larry Weiss	4:40
12.	"Nice Girls" (extended version)	Jan Buckingham; Steve Buckingham; Mark Grey	5:16
13.	"O Heaven (How You've Changed Me)" (single mix)	Manchester	3:12

== Charts ==
Chart (1979/80)	Position
United States (Billboard 200)	63
Australia (Kent Music Report)	93

== Personnel ==
- Melissa Manchester – lead vocals, additional backing vocals (2, 4, 5, 8), acoustic piano (10)
- Alan Feingold – keyboards
- Randy McCormick – keyboards, string arrangements (1)
- Larry Byrom – guitars
- Tom Robb – bass
- Steve Tischer – bass
- James Stroud – drums, percussion
- Mickey Buckins – percussion
- Jay Scott – alto sax solo
- David Manchester – bassoon (7)
- Steve Dorff – string arrangements (1, 2, 4)
- Barry Fasman – string arrangements (3)
- Gene Page – string arrangements (6, 8)
- Steve Cagen – string arrangements (7)
- Sid Sharp – concertmaster (1–4, 6–8)
- Tower of Power Horns (6)
  - Steve "Doc" Kupka – baritone saxophone
  - Lenny Pickett – alto saxophone, tenor saxophone
  - Emilio Castillo – tenor saxophone
  - Mic Gillette – trombone, trumpet
  - Greg Adams – trumpet, horn arrangements
- Charles Chalmers – backing vocals
- Donna Rhodes – backing vocals
- Sandra Rhodes – backing vocals
- Paul Davis – backing vocals (2)
- Arnold McCuller – lead and backing vocals (7)

=== Production ===
- Steve Buckingham – producer
- Ed Seay – recording, mixing, horn recording, string recording
- Alan Chinowsky – horn recording
- Alex Kashevaroff – horn recording
- Tim Boyle – string recording
- Lenny Roberts – string recording
- Tommy Cooper – assistant engineer
- Richard Wells – assistant engineer
- Glenn Meadows – mastering at Masterfonics (Nashville, Tennessee)
- Kay Steele – cover coordinator
- John Kosh – art direction, design
- Steve Schapiro – photography
- Wayne Massarelli – make-up
- José Eber – hair stylist
- Michael Lippman – management
