= Alicia Bridges (album) =

Studio album by Alicia Bridges
- Released: July 1978
- Recorded: 1977–1978
- Studio: Studio One, Doraville, Georgia; The Sound Pit, Atlanta, Georgia
- Genre: Disco
- Label: Polydor
- Producer: Steve Buckingham (for The Lowery Group)

Alicia Bridges chronology
Alicia Bridges (1978)	Play It as It Lays (1979)

Professional ratings
Review scores
Source	Rating
Allmusic	2/5 stars
Smash Hits	5/10

Alicia Bridges is the eponymous debut album from disco singer-songwriter Alicia Bridges, released in 1978 on Polydor Records. The album featured the smash hit single, "I Love the Nightlife (Disco Round)", which, when released as a 12" single (as remixed by producer Jim Burgess), reached a peak of number 5 on the Billboard, Cash Box & Record World charts in 1978 (quickly becoming an RIAA-certified gold record for sales of over one million copies; it would now be seen as a platinum record). Alicia Bridges peaked a number 52 on the Australian chart.

Bridges released a second single shortly thereafter; the rock-inflected "Body Heat", which had the same strong backbeat as her big hit, but also featured more prominent rhythm guitar. The song became a minor hit, but it was the success of the first single that drove the album, which climbed the charts quickly and remained there for a total of 35 weeks. Bridges would be nominated for a Grammy and performed the hit single as an opening act.

== Track listing ==
All songs written by Alicia Bridges and Susan Hutcheson, except where noted.

1. "Body Heat" – 3:02
2. "Break Away" – 3:27
3. "High Altitudes" – 5:01
4. "We Are One" – 4:20
5. "City Rhythm" – 3:38
6. "I Love the Nightlife (Disco 'Round)" – 5:37
7. "In the Name of Love" (Bridges) – 4:07
8. "Self Applause" – 3:22
9. "Diamond in the Rough" – 3:28
10. "Broken Woman" (Bridges) – 4:20

== Personnel ==
- Alicia Bridges - lead and backing vocal
- Bernardine Mitchell, Keith "Doc" Samuels, Vinni O'Neal - backing vocals
- Steve Buckingham, Ken Bell - guitars
- John Fristoe - guitars, backing vocals
- Randy McCormick - organ, piano, synthesizers, clavinet, melodica, string arrangements
- Alan Feingold, Steve McRay - organ
- Tom Robb - bass
- Roy Yeager - drums
- Mickey Buckins - percussion
- Jay Scott - saxophone

== Production ==
- Produced by Steve Buckingham for The Lowery Group
- Engineered by Pete Turbiville
- Mix & re-mixed Milan Bogdan, Pete Turbiville, Rodney Mills & Tad Bush
- Mastered by Bob Ludwig
- Rick Diamond - sleeve photography
