= The Saint (New York City) =

American gay superclub

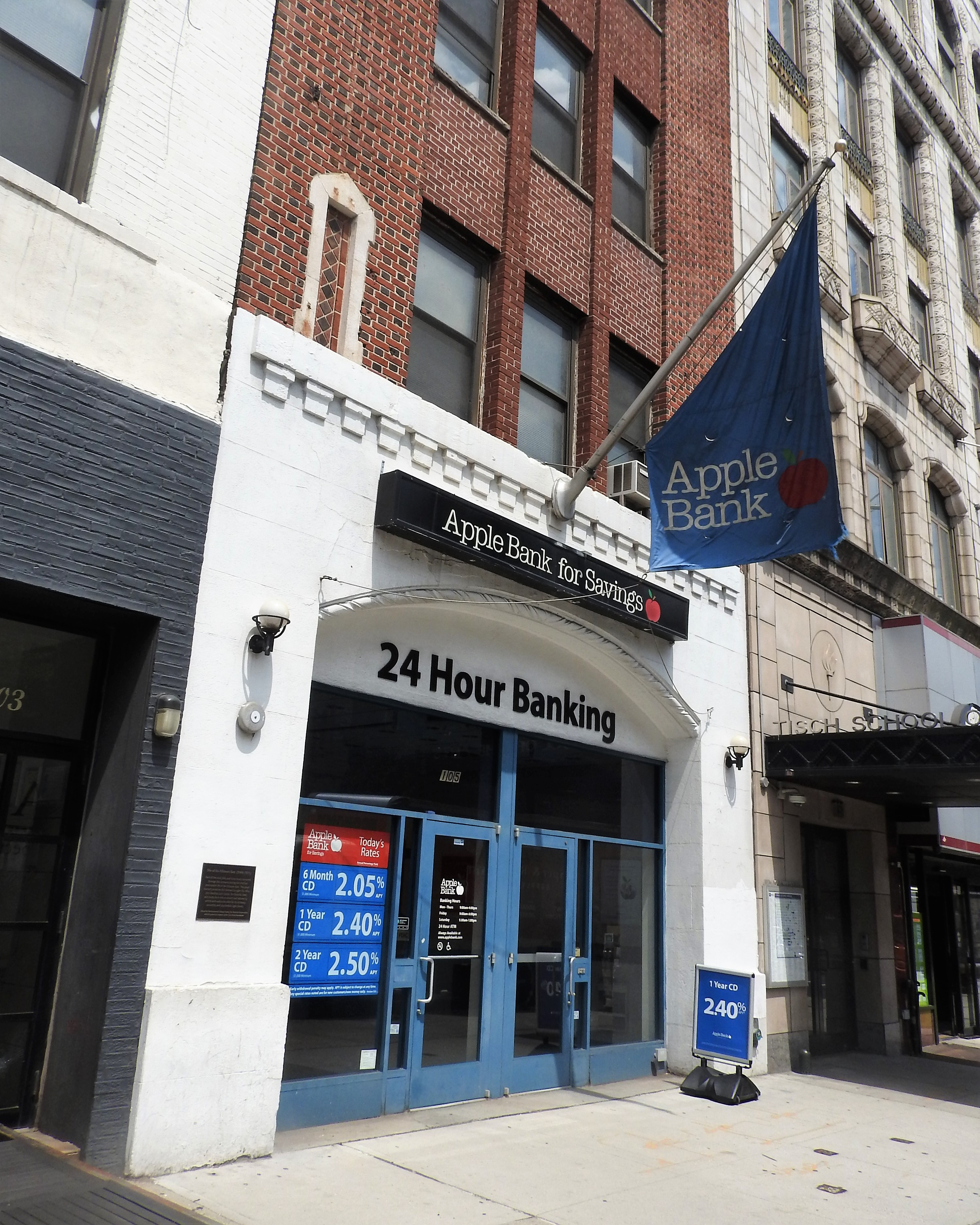
- Entrance to The Saint (entrance area later became a bank branch)
- Interactive map of The Saint
- Address: 105 Second Avenue (at 6th Street); Manhattan, New York, U.S.
- Coordinates: 40.7276°N 73.9886°W
- Owner: Bruce Mailman
- Capacity: 3,500–4,000
- Type: Nightclub
- Event: Discothèque

Construction
- Built: 1926 (100 years ago)
- Opened: 1980 (46 years ago)
- Closed: 1988 (38 years ago)

The Saint was an American gay nightclub, located in the East Village neighborhood of Manhattan, New York City. It operated from 1980 to 1988.

== History ==
It opened in the old premises of the Fillmore East, a 1926-built, former-theater-turned-classic-rock-and-roll venue of the late 1960s and early 1970s, at 105 Second Avenue at 6th Street. The Saint was opened by Bruce Mailman and his business partner and his architectural designer, Charles Terrell.

The original opening date was set for July 30, 1980, but construction delays forced a deferral to September 20, 1980, with Alan Dodd as disc jockey. The nightclub was a success even before it opened. Membership packs with floor plans were distributed and before the club opened 2,500 memberships had been sold at $150 each for the first 700 members and for $250 for the rest, with a waiting list established.

It was financed in large part by Mailman's other gay venture, the nearby New St. Marks Baths – a gay mecca at the time. The nightclub's renovation cost $4.5 million, being $2 million over budget ($17 million at 2017 prices). Money was spent repairing the roof, paying six years of back taxes to the city and fitting out the interior. It opened initially as a private membership gay nightclub (returning the idea of a club to "nightclub"), and set the standard for disco presentation, lighting, sound system, hydraulics and technical support.

However, by the end of its second season, AIDS had begun eating through the fabric of gay life in New York City and began to take a heavy and relentless toll on the Saint's membership. Change came quickly. Membership costs were lowered and the season extended into the summer so that the club was open almost all year round. By its seventh season, membership costs had fallen to $50. It also opened weekly for a straight crowd. Furthermore, by 1985, the Black Party performers were for the first time required to perform safe sex. By 1987, the performance emphasised masturbation, phone sex and mud wrestling, all a far cry from the club's early days which, on one celebrated occasion, a boa constrictor was used as a prop.

== Venue ==
The circular dance floor (5,000 square feet or 460 square meters) was topped by a perforated planetarium dome 76 feet (23 meters) in diameter and 38 feet (12 meters) high. In addition to hiding the speakers, the dome served as a spectacular palette for the lighting effects. A circular opening at the top of the dome could be automatically opened and closed to allow a large mirrored disco ball to be lowered into the space. The speaker cabinets were located on, and attached directly to, the outer surface of the dome, creating a very euphonic "surround sound" effect, the sound system in the club consisted of 500 speakers generating 26,000 watts. In the center of the dance floor was a circular light tree constructed on a hydraulic lift. It contained 1,500 lights and as its centerpiece was a rotating, dual Spitz Space System hemisphere star projector, ten times brighter than those used in planetariums. Mailman had initially approached Zeiss regarding the purchase of a star-projection system, but the company refused to sell one, believing its use in a gay club would be an inappropriate use for their system.

Directly underneath the dance-floor level was a large lounge with several juice bars. Beer on tap was sometimes served for free to avoid the licensing oversight of the New York State Liquor Authority. Above and outside the dome was what would become the controversial balcony, where patrons could see down to the dance floor, through the scrim of the dome. It was there that men relaxed and, according to the sexual mores of the times, could indulge in sexual activities. Several times during the year, themed parties such as the "Black Party" and the "White Party" attracted celebrities from around the world.

== DJs ==
The Saturday night DJs at the nightclub included Jim Burgess, Roy Thode, Alan Dodd, Robbie Leslie, Mark Thomas, Terry Sherman, Shaun Buchanan, Michael Fierman, Warren Gluck, Wayne Scott, Chuck Parsons, Michael Cavalone, Nao Nakamura and Sharon White. The lighting was operated by Marsha Stern, Richard Tucker, Mark Ackerman, Jorge Villardell, Richard Erskine, Tony DeVizia and Richard Sabala.

== Live performances ==
Musicians who performed at the nightclub include:

- Patti Austin
- Baltimora
- Claudja Barry
- Celi Bee
- Laura Branigan
- Jocelyn Brown
- Miquel Brown
- Betty Buckley
- Irene Cara
- Cerrone
- Linda Clifford
- Natalie Cole
- Company B
- The Cover Girls
- Tim Curry
- E.G. Daily
- Sarah Dash
- Taylor Dayne
- Dead or Alive
- Hazell Dean
- Kiki Dee
- Teri DeSario
- Divine
- Dominatrix
- Carol Douglas
- Erasure
- Exposé
- The Flirts
- Freeez
- Fun Fun
- Taana Gardner
- Gloria Gaynor
- Debbie Gibson
- Gwen Guthrie
- Sam Harris
- Debbie Harry
- Dan Hartman
- George Hearn
- Nona Hendryx
- Jennifer Holliday
- Loleatta Holloway
- Thelma Houston
- Rhetta Hughes
- Imagination
- Paul Jabara
- Debbie Jacobs
- France Joli
- Grace Jones
- Madleen Kane
- Chaka Khan
- Eartha Kitt
- Rose Laurens
- Amanda Lear
- Paul Lekakis
- Lime
- Dorothy Loudon
- Darlene Love
- Lorna Luft
- Patti LuPone
- Cheryl Lynn
- Kelly Marie
- Nancy Martinez
- Ullanda McCullough
- Maureen McGovern
- Stephanie Mills
- Liliane Montevecchi
- Jackie Moore
- Melba Moore
- Phyllis Nelson
- Noel Pagan
- Paul Parker
- Pepsi & Shirlie
- Pet Shop Boys
- Bonnie Pointer
- Fonda Rae
- Sheryl Lee Ralph
- Red Hot Chili Peppers
- Sharon Redd
- Helen Reddy
- Chita Rivera
- Louise Robey
- Vicki Sue Robinson
- Jimmy Ruffin
- RuPaul
- Seduction
- John Sex
- Shannon
- Dee Dee Sharp
- Marlena Shaw
- Sinitta
- Pamala Stanley
- Brenda K. Starr
- Amii Stewart
- Jermaine Stewart
- Jeff Stryker
- Swing Out Sister
- Sylvester
- Evelyn Thomas
- Tiffany
- Judy Torres
- Tina Turner
- Bonnie Tyler
- Leslie Uggams
- Luther Vandross
- Sarah Vaughan
- Tata Vega
- Shriekback
- Jody Watley
- The Weather Girls
- Deniece Williams
- Viola Wills
- Mary Wilson
- Betty Wright
- Val Young

== See also ==
- LGBT culture in New York City
- List of electronic dance music venues
- List of nightclubs in New York City
- Superclub
