= No Night So Long =

Studio album by Dionne Warwick
- Released: July 18, 1980
- Studios: Mastersound Studios (Atlanta, Georgia); Britannia Studios (Hollywood, California); Record Plant (Sausalito, California)
- Genres: Funk; soul; pop
- Length: 35:38
- Label: Arista
- Producer: Steve Buckingham

Dionne Warwick chronology
Dionne (1979)	No Night So Long (1980)	Hot! Live and Otherwise (1981)

Singles from No Night So Long
- 1. "No Night So Long" Released: July 1980; 2. "Easy Love" Released: November 1980

Professional ratings
Review scores
Source	Rating
AllMusic	2/5 stars

No Night So Long is a studio album by American singer Dionne Warwick. It was released by Arista Records on July 18, 1980, in the United States. Her second album for the label, Warwick worked with producer Steve Buckingham on the album, which was recorded during the spring of that year.

== Singles ==
The album's title track, "No Night So Long", was written by Richard Kerr and Will Jennings, the same team that wrote Warwick's 1979 comeback hit "I'll Never Love This Way Again". The title track is one of two US charting songs from the album, reaching number 23 on the Billboard Hot 100. The other single, "Easy Love," peaked at number 62 on the same chart. Both songs were also hits on the Adult Contemporary chart with "Easy Love" peaking at number 12 and "No Night So Long" spending three weeks at number 1.

== Track listing ==
All tracks produced by Steve Buckingham.

Side one
No.	Title	Writer(s)	Length
1.	"Easy Love"	Steve Dorff; Larry Herbstritt; Randy Cate	3:15
2.	"No Night So Long"	Richard Kerr; Will Jennings	3:26
3.	"It's the Falling in Love"	Carole Bayer Sager; David Foster	3:23
4.	"When the World Runs Out of Love"	Chris Christian; Robbie Patton	3:44
5.	"We Never Said Goodbye"	Isaac Hayes; Adrienne Anderson	3:41

Side two
No.	Title	Writer(s)	Length
6.	"How You Once Loved Me"	Allee Willis; Bruce Roberts	3:33
7.	"Reaching for the Sky"	Peabo Bryson	4:28
8.	"Sweetie Pie"	Eric Mercury; William Smith	2:30
9.	"Somebody's Angel"	David Lasley; Peter Allen	3:44
10.	"We Had This Time"	Melissa Manchester; Larry Weiss	3:44

Déjà Vu – The Arista Recordings (2020) bonus tracks
No.	Title	Writer(s)	Length
11.	"Even a Fool Would Let Go"	Kerry Chater; Tom Snow	3:13
12.	"Dedicate This Heart"	Michael McDonald; Paul Anka	4:03
13.	"Now That the Feeling’s Gone"	Mickey Buckins; Randy McCormick	3:24
14.	"Starting Tomorrow"	Steve Buckingham	2:49
15.	"This Time Is Ours"	Gerry Goffin; Michael Masser	3:47
16.	"Only Heaven Can Wait for Love"	Eric Mercury; Roberta Flack	2:58
17.	"Right Back"	Marti Sharron	2:58
18.	"When the Good Times Come Again"	Richard Kerr; Will Jennings	4:00
19.	"This Is What I’ve Wanted All My Life"	Melissa Manchester	4:16

== Personnel ==
Musicians

- Dionne Warwick – lead vocals, backing vocals
- Randy McCormick – keyboards, rhythm track arrangements
- Joe Neil – synthesizers
- Isaac Hayes – organ
- Steve Buckingham – guitars, rhythm track arrangements
- Larry Byrom – guitars
- Tom Robb – bass
- James Stroud – drums
- Mickey Buckins – percussion
- Steve Dorff – timpani, orchestra bells, string arrangements and conductor
- Jimmy Getzoff – concertmaster
- Jay Scott – alto saxophone solo
- Tower of Power Horn Section:
  - Greg Adams – horn arrangements
  - Emilio Castillo – tenor saxophone
  - Stephen Kupka – baritone saxophone
  - Lenny Pickett – alto saxophone, tenor saxophone
  - Mic Gillette – trombone, trumpet, flugelhorn
- Kim Carnes – additional backing vocals
- Mark Piscitelli – additional backing vocals
- Nick Uhrig – additional backing vocals
- Maxine Waters – additional backing vocals
- Julia Waters – additional backing vocals

Production

- Steve Buckingham – producer
- Joe Neil – recording engineer, mixing
- Alan Chinowsky – horn recording engineer
- Lenny Roberts – string recording engineer
- Russell Bracher – assistant string engineer
- Alex Kashevaroff – assistant horn engineer
- Glenn Meadows – mastering at Masterfonics (Nashville, Tennessee)
- Kathy Andrews – production assistant
- Jan Bidewell – production assistant
- Donn Davenport – art direction
- Harry Langdon – photography
- Clifford Peterson – hair stylist
- Lisa Pharren – make-up
- Wynona Price – make-up
- Suzy Creamcheese – gowns
- Dionne Warwick – jewelry, fur coat

== Charts ==
Chart performance for No Night So Long
Chart (1980)	Peak position
Australian Albums (Kent Music Report)	98
Canada Top 100 Albums (RPM)	73
US Top LPs & Tape (Billboard)	23
US Soul LPs (Billboard)	22
US Top 100 Albums (Cash Box)	24
US Top 75 Black Contemporary Albums (Cash Box)	19
US The Album Chart (Record World)	36
US Black Oriented Album Chart (Record World)	27
