= Tom Robb =

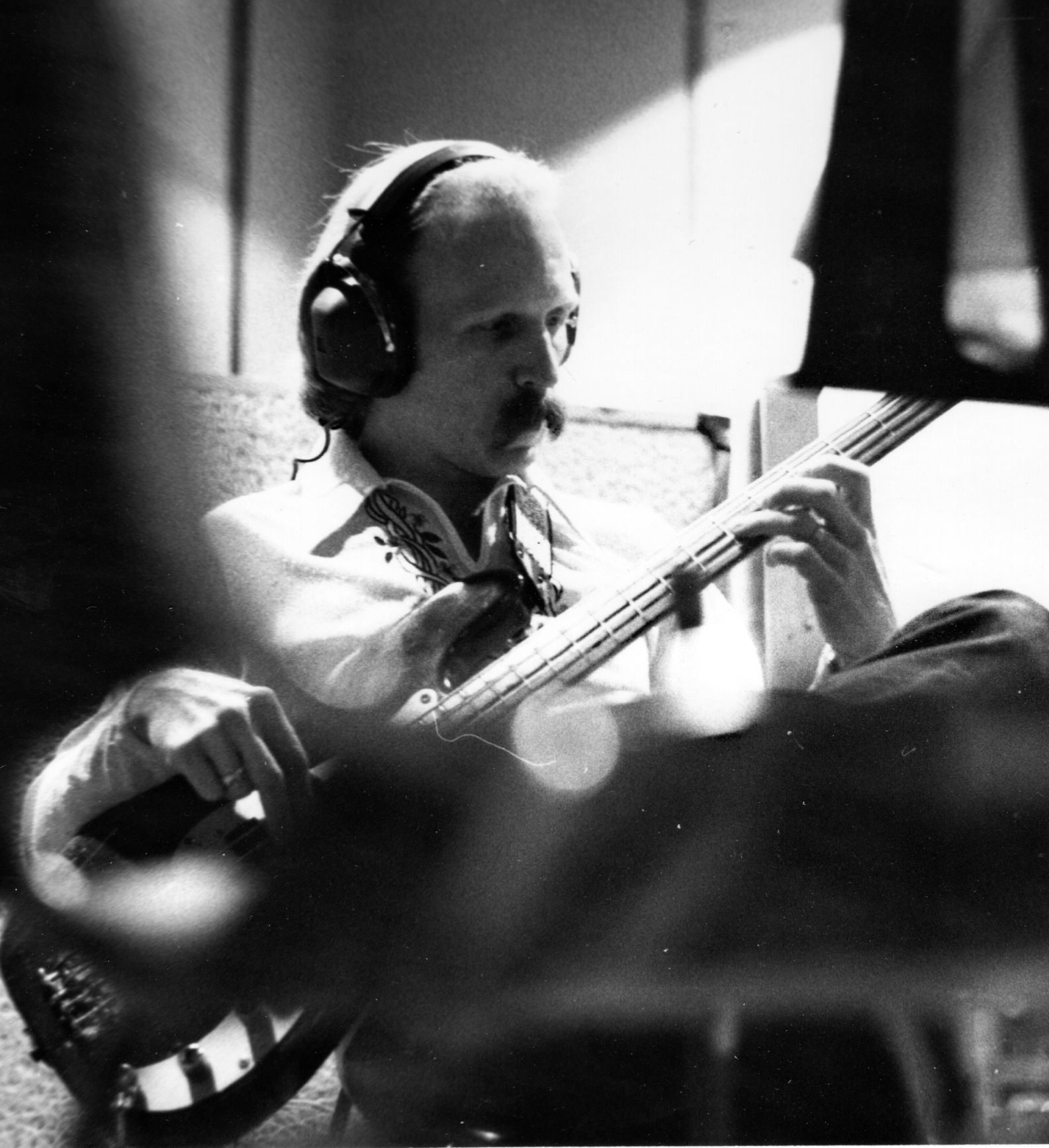

Background information
- Born: Thomas James Robb; July 12, 1948; Passaic, New Jersey
- Died: March 6, 2006 (aged 57) Nashville, Tennessee
- Genres: Rock; Blues; Gospel; Country; Jazz
- Occupation: Session musician
- Instrument: Bass
- Years active: 1965-2006

Tom Robb (July 12, 1948 – March 6, 2006) was an American session bassist who is best known for his work with acts like Dionne Warwick, Little Richard, Dolly Parton, The Marshall Tucker Band, and many others. He was also the featured bassist on Alicia Bridges' 1978 song, "I Love the Nightlife." Over the course of his career, he played bass on hundreds of records for a wide range of artists in Atlanta, Georgia and Nashville, Tennessee. He also helped create material for television shows, movies, and other publishing projects.

== Early life ==
Robb was born and grew up in Passaic, New Jersey. As a child, Robb experienced homelessness and lived with several foster families. In high school, he spent time at the Bonnie Brae Farm for Boys near Basking Ridge, New Jersey. There, he began playing drums and taught himself how to play the bass. In the late 1960s, Robb moved to Greenwich Village in New York where he began playing in bands and doing session work in studios.

== Career ==
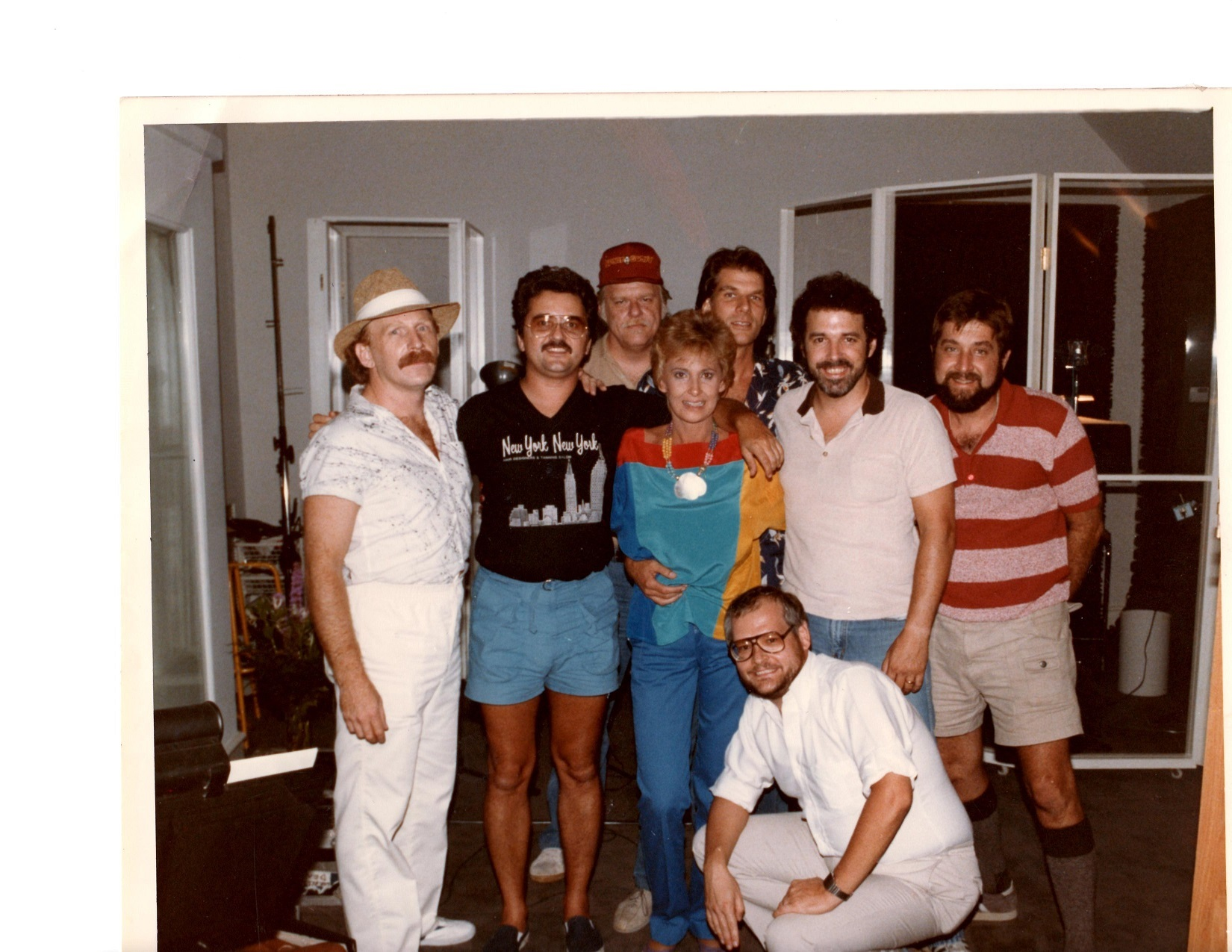
Tom Robb (left) with (left to right) Larry Byrum, Barry Beckett, Tammy Wynette, Steve Buckingham, Eddie Bayers, Gene Eichelberger, and Steve Gibson (kneeling)

In 1970, Robb moved to Atlanta, Georgia where he teamed up with Mylon LeFevre, a rock and gospel artist. LeFevre signed with Columbia Records, and formed the "Holy Smoke Doo Dah Band" with Auburn Burrell and J.P. Lauzon on guitar, drummer Marty Simon, Tom Robb on bass and keyboardist Lester Langdale. From 1970 through 1980, he performed alongside acts such as Eric Clapton, Elton John, Billy Joel, Duane Allman, Berry Oakley, Little Richard, and The Who among others. In 1973, Robb was recruited by Leslie West to join the Leslie West and the Wild West Show for a United States tour. He was filling in for regular bassist, Jack Bruce, who had fallen ill prior to the tour's start. From July to August 1973, the group toured the eastern and Midwestern United States alongside acts like Stevie Wonder, Humble Pie, Sly and the Family Stone, and Ted Nugent.

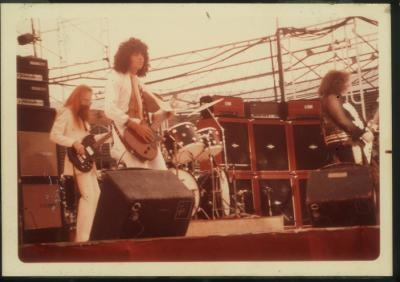
Tom Robb playing with Leslie West and the Wild West Show

While in Atlanta, Robb did session work with artists like Little Richard, Dionne Warwick, Frankie Miller, Allen Toussaint, Browning Bryant, and Melissa Manchester. In 1978, he was the featured bassist on Alicia Bridges' Grammy-nominated "I Love the Nightlife," which peaked at number 2 on Billboard's disco chart and at number 5 on the pop chart. The song was produced by Steve Buckingham who remained Robb's friends for more than 30 years till his death.

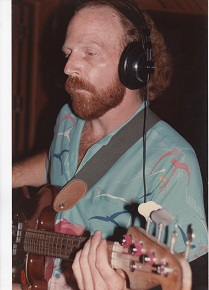
Tom Robb on bass

In 1980, Robb moved to Nashville, Tennessee where he worked in numerous studios. He did session work for a wide variety of artists, including Dolly Parton, Tammy Wynette, Sweethearts of the Rodeo, Eddie Rabbitt, The Winans, Aaron Tippin, Deborah Allen, Vern Gosdin, and many more. Robb was also a member of The Marshall Tucker Band from 1985 to 1987. Throughout his career, Robb played in hundreds of sessions and worked on television, film, and other publishing projects.

== Personal life ==
Robb married singer-songwriter, Melanie Dyer, in 1987, and the couple remained together for 19 years until Robb's death in 2006. The two had no children together. Robb was an avid New York Yankees fan and he enjoyed acquiring sports collectibles. He was also known to be fond of many different animals, especially dogs.

== Illness and death ==
In 2004, Robb was diagnosed with liver cancer. He died on March 6, 2006, from complications of the disease. On March 25, 2006, a memorial service for Robb was held in the Ford Theatre at the Country Music Hall of Fame and Museum in Nashville. In a June 2006 article in Bass Player Magazine, Robb's longtime friend and Nashville drummer Eddie Bayers noted, "I loved Tom Robb. He played right in the center of the beat. He wasn’t just in the pocket—he was the whole pair of pants!"

== Selected discography ==
Robb was a regular member of Mylon LeFevre's Holy Smoke Doo Dah Band, The Marshall Tucker Band, Sweethearts of the Rodeo, Paul Davis' backing band, and Shirley Eikhard's backing band. He was also the bassist in all of the following recordings:

Year	Artist/Band	Recording/Album	Record label	Notes
1971	Mylon Lefevre and the Holy Smoke Doo Dah Band	Holy Smoke	CBS Records International	Rock
1974	Frankie Miller	High Life	Chrysalis Records	Blues
1974	Paul Davis	Ride 'Em Cowboy	Bang Records	Pop
1977	Johnny Nash	What a Wonderful World	Epic Records	Pop
1977	Bobby Jones	Soul Set Free	Myrrh Records	Won a Grammy
1978	Alicia Bridges	"I Love the Nightlife"	Polydor Records	Grammy-nominated (funk, soul)
1978	Mylon LeFevre	"Play It as It Lays"	Warner Bros. Records	Rock
1979	Melissa Manchester	Melissa Manchester	Arista Records	Pop
1980	Dionne Warwick	No Night So Long	Arista Records	Pop
1980	Melissa Manchester	For the Working Girl	Arista Records	Pop
1981	Dionne Warwick	"Even a Fool Would Let Go"	Arista Records	Pop
1982	Crystal Gayle	True Love	Elektra Records	Country
1983	Shirley Caesar	Jesus, I Love Calling Your Name	Elektra Records	Gospel
1983	The Tams	Beach Music from The Tams	Compleat Records	Pop
1983	Melissa Manchester	"Whenever I Call You 'Friend'"	Arista Records	Pop
1984	Eddie Rabbitt	The Best Year of My Life	Warner Bros. Records	Country
1984	Deborah Allen	Let Me Be the First	RCA Records	Country
1985	Tammy Wynette	"Sometimes When We Touch"	Epic Records	Country
1985	John Schneider	Tryin' to Outrun the Wind	MCA Records	Country
1987	Ricky Van Shelton	Wild-Eyed Dream	Columbia Records	Country
1987	Tammy Wynette	Higher Ground	Columbia Records	Country
1988	John Barlow Jarvis	Whatever Works	MCA Records	Jazz
1989	Vern Gosdin	Alone	Columbia Records	Country
1990	Sweethearts of the Rodeo	Buffalo Zone	Columbia Records	Country
1993	Dolly Parton, Loretta Lynn, and Tammy Wynette	Honky Tonk Angels	Columbia Records	Country
1994	The Winans	All Out	Warner & Qwest	Gospel
1999	Michael Johnson	The Very Best of Michael Johnson: Bluer Than Blue (1978–1995)	Capitol Records	Pop/Rock
