= Dave O'Higgins =

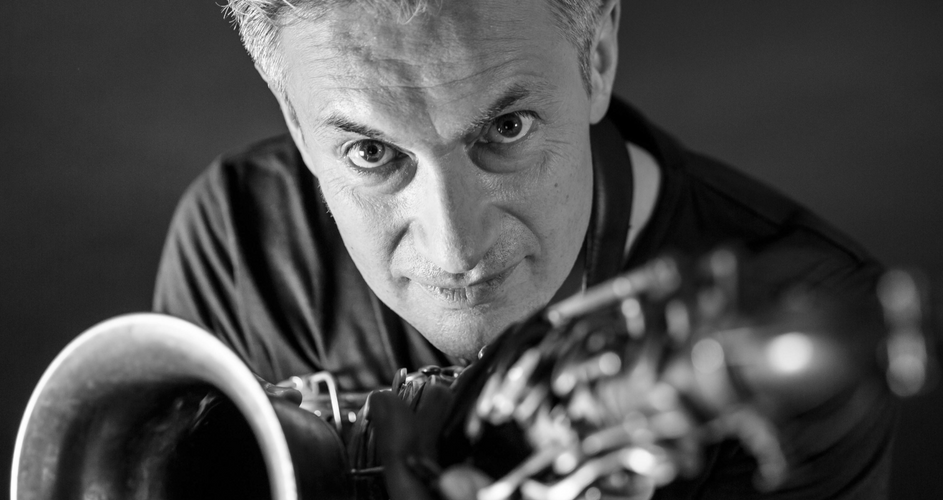

Background information
- Born: 1 September 1964 (age 61); Birmingham, England
- Genres: Jazz
- Occupations: Composer, educator, musician, producer
- Instrument: Saxophone
- Years active: 1980s–present
- Website: www.daveohiggins.com

Dave O'Higgins (born 1 September 1964) is an English jazz saxophonist, composer, arranger, educator and latterly recording engineer and producer.

O'Higgins first emerged on the British jazz scene in the 1980s. After playing in the National Youth Jazz Orchestra for three years O'Higgins joined the band of Jim Mullen before moving on to Martin Taylor's band.

His influences are drawn from Charlie Parker, Dexter Gordon, John Coltrane, Joe Henderson through to Stanley Turrentine and Michael Brecker. His current project is The Dave O'Higgins Quartet with Sebastiaan de Krom (drums), Geoff Gascoyne (bass) and Graham Harvey (piano). He also plays, tours and writes with Matt Bianco.

== Discography ==
=== As leader ===
- 1993 All Good Things (EFZ)
- 1994 Beats Working For A Living (recorded in New York) (EFZ)
- 1995 Under The Stone (EFZ) (jazz quintet plus string section)
- 1996 The Secret Ingredient (EFZ)
- 1999 The Grinder’s Monkey (Short Fuse)
- 2001 Big Shake Up by Dave O’Higgins’ Biggish Band (Candid)
- 2002 Fast Foot Shuffle (Candid)
- 2004 Push (Short Fuse)
- 2008 In the Zone (Jazzizit)
- 2009 Sketchbook
- 2010 Relaxin' at Mount Lavinia (JVG)
- 2011 The Devil's Interval (with Eric Alexander) (JVG)
- 2012 Got the Real Note (Jazzizit) with the Gascoyne/O'Higgins Quartet
- 2013 Two Minds Big Band (JVG)
- 2014 Standards (JVG)
- 2014 The Real Note Vol. 2 (Jazzizit) with the Gascoyne/O'Higgins Quartet
- 2015 Oh, Gee (Woodville)
- 2015 The Abstract Truth Big Band (JVG Productions)
- 2017 It's Always 9.30 In Zog (JVG Productions)

=== As sideman ===
With Martin Taylor

- 1994 Spirit of Django
- 1996 Years Apart
- 2000 Gypsy

With Others

- 1986 No Limits, Mezzoforte
- 1989 For Mad Men only, Roadside Picnic
- 1997 Sweet Surprise, Trudy Kerr
- 2001 An Ordinary Day in an Unusual Place, Us3
- 2003 Goodbye Swingtime, Matthew Herbert
- 2005 Ruby Blue, Róisín Murphy
- 2006 Now, Kyle Eastwood
- 2007 Rise Up, Nasio Fontaine
- 2008 There's Me and There's You, Matthew Herbert
- 2012 Upside Down, Jazzanova
