= For the Working Girl =

Studio album by Melissa Manchester
- Released: August 1980
- Recorded: 1980
- Studio: Northstar Studios (Boulder, Colorado); Web IV Studios (Atlanta, Georgia); Britannia Studios (Hollywood, California)
- Genre: Pop
- Length: 40:42
- Label: Arista
- Producer: Steve Buckingham

Melissa Manchester chronology
Melissa Manchester (1979)	For the Working Girl (1980)	Hey Ricky (1982)

Singles from For the Working Girl
- 1. "If This Is Love" Released: 1980; 2. "Lovers After All" Released: February 1981; 3. "Without You" Released: 1981

For the Working Girl is the ninth album by singer-songwriter Melissa Manchester, released by Arista Records.

Recorded at Northstar Studios in Boulder, Colorado, in the summer of 1980, For the Working Girl reteamed Manchester with Steve Buckingham, producer of the title cut of the singer's 1979 self-titled album release; as with the Melissa Manchester album, the track listing of For the Working Girl balanced Manchester originals (totaling five) with outside material (totaling six).

Released in September 1980, For the Working Girl received heavy promotion emphasizing Manchester's new streamlined image, the album's cover photograph being taken by glamor shot specialist George Hurrell. Also stressed in the album promotion was the album's title cut, Manchester's collaboration with Bernie Taupin famed as regular lyricist for Elton John during the first phase of the latter's career: Manchester and Taupin had met through having the same manager, and their musical collaboration "For the Working Girl" was touted as a feminist anthem in the tradition of Helen Reddy's "I Am Woman". It was announced in November 1980 that Pistol Productions, owned by Taupin and Michael Lippman, would produce a feature film entitled Working Girl based on the title cut of Manchester's current album with the singer in a starring role. However Manchester's acting career would prove to be occasional with her only starring roles onstage, her onscreen feature film credit being a small role in For the Boys (1991) as a backup singer to the lead character played by Bette Midler (Manchester had begun her performing career as a member of Midler's Harlettes backing group).

Despite the promo emphasis on the album's title cut, the choice for lead single fell to "If This Is Love" an easy listening ballad which charted on Billboard's A/C chart (#19) but failed to reach the Hot 100 stalling at #102. The album's second single release - in February 1981 - was "Lovers After All", a duet with Peabo Bryson, the first A-side release written by Manchester since the non-charting "Be Somebody" in early 1977. Written with Leon Ware, "Lovers After All" reached three Billboard charts - the Hot 100 (at #54), R&B chart (#35) and A/C (#25) without sufficient impact to be considered a comeback for Manchester. A third single: a remake of the 1972 #1 hit by Nilsson: "Without You", failed to chart.

Without the impetus of a major hit single, For the Working Girl maintained Manchester as a moderate presence on the Billboard album chart peaking at #68.

The personnel on For the Working Girl includes the singer's father David Manchester on bassoon.

== Track listing ==
1. "If This Is Love" (Kerry Chater, Robbie Patton) - 3:39
2. "Any Kind of Fool" (Don Stalker, Steve Berg, Steve Dorff) - 3:07
3. "(For the) Working Girl" (Bernie Taupin, Melissa Manchester) - 4:13
4. "Without You" (Pete Ham, Thomas Evans) - 3:26
5. "Boys in the Backroom" (Manchester) - 3:35
6. "You and Me" (Carole Bayer Sager, Peter Allen) - 3:52
7. "Talk" (Manchester, Allee Willis) - 3:46
8. "A Fool's Affair" (Richard Kerr, Troy Seals) - 3:41
9. "Lovers After All" (Manchester, Leon Ware) - 4:14; Duet with Peabo Bryson
10. "Tears of Joy" (Manchester, Alan and Marilyn Bergman) - 3:55
11. "Happier Than I've Ever Been" (Manchester) - 3:29

== Personnel ==
- Melissa Manchester – lead vocals
- Randy McCormick – keyboards, rhythm arrangements
- Alan Feingold – synthesizers
- Larry Byrom – guitars
- Steve Buckingham – guitars, rhythm arrangements
- Tom Robb – bass
- James Stroud – drums, percussion
- Tommy Cooper – glockenspiel
- Avtar Singh Khalsa – marimba, vibraphone
- Beth Cooper – French horn
- David Manchester – bassoon
- Barry Fasman – horn and string arrangements (1–9)
- Steve Cagen – horn and string arrangements (10, 11)
- Sid Sharp – concertmaster
- Patti Allinson – backing vocals
- Steve Carlisle – backing vocals
- Charles Chalmers – backing vocals
- Paul Davis – backing vocals
- Don Henley – backing vocals
- Kathleen Jackson – backing vocals
- Bernadine Mitchell – backing vocals
- Donna Rhodes – backing vocals
- Sandra Rhodes – backing vocals
- Ed Seay – backing vocals
- Peabo Bryson – lead vocals (9)

=== Production ===
- Steve Buckingham – producer
- Larry Roberts – engineer
- Ed Seay – engineer, mixing
- Russell Bracher – assistant engineer
- Tommy Cooper – assistant engineer
- Julian Stoll – assistant engineer
- Glenn Meadows – mastering at Masterfonics (Nashville, Tennessee)
- Ria Lewerke-Shapiro – art direction
- George Hurrell – photography
- Wayne Massarelli – make-up
- José Eber – hair stylist
- Michael Lippman – management
