= Déjà Vu (Dionne Warwick song) =

Single by Dionne Warwick

from the album Dionne
- B-side: "All the Time"
- Released: November 1979
- Genre: Pop; R&B
- Length: 5:06 (CD version); 4:06 (album version); 3:40 (single edit)
- Songwriters: Isaac Hayes; Adrienne Anderson
- Producer: Barry Manilow

Dionne Warwick singles chronology
"I'll Never Love This Way Again" (1979)	"Déjà Vu" (1979)	"After You" (1980)

"Déjà Vu" is a hit 1979 ballad written by Isaac Hayes with lyricist Adrienne Anderson, recorded by Dionne Warwick for her album Dionne which Barry Manilow produced. The song won Warwick a Grammy Award for Best Female R&B Vocal Performance at the 22nd Grammy Awards.

== Background ==
Isaac Hayes had written the tune for "Déjà Vu" in 1977 while touring with Warwick on the A Man and a Woman Tour: Warwick would recall then hearing Hayes play the tune – which he had entitled "Déjà Vu" without writing lyrics – and as she and Barry Manilow began preparing for the January 1979 recording sessions for the Dionne album, Warwick solicited a tape of "Déjà Vu" from Hayes to play for Manilow, who recruited his own regular lyricist Adrienne Anderson to write the words.

== Chart performance ==
Issued in November 1979 as the album's second single – following up Warwick's top five comeback hit "I'll Never Love This Way Again" – "Déjà Vu" rose to number 15 on the US Billboard Hot 100, number 25 on the Hot R&B/Hip-Hop Songs chart, and number one on the Adult Contemporary chart in early 1980. "Déjà Vu" was Warwick's fifth and last Top 40 single of her 1970s period and her second top 40 single following the release of "I'll Never Love This Way Again" in the five years since her number-one single, "Then Came You", featuring The Spinners.

== Track listing and formats ==
- US 7" Vinyl single

A. "Déjà Vu" – 3:40
B. "All The Time" – 4:06

== Charts ==
=== Weekly charts ===
Chart (1979–80)	Peak position
Australia (Kent Music Report)	69
Canadian Top Singles (RPM)	34
Canadian Adult Contemporary (RPM)	7
New Zealand (Recorded Music NZ)	45
US Billboard Hot 100	15
US Adult Contemporary (Billboard)	1
US Hot R&B/Hip-Hop Songs (Billboard)	25
US Cashbox Top 100	11

=== Year-end charts ===
Chart (1980)	Rank
US Billboard Hot 100	84
US Cashbox Top 100	73

== Other versions ==
The song has also been recorded by Ethel Ennis (album Live at the Maryland Inn/ 1980), Jack Jones (album Don't Stop Now/ 1980), Trudy Kerr (album Déjà Vu: Songs From My Past/ 2008), and by guitarist Peter White (album Playin' Favorites/ 2006) with vocalist Kiki Ebsen.

== See also ==
- List of number-one adult contemporary singles of 1980 (U.S.)
