= You Can =

Single by Madleen Kane

from the album Don't Wanna Lose You
- B-side: "Fire in My Heart"
- Released: 21 February 1981
- Recorded: 1980
- Genre: Pop, post-disco, new wave
- Length: 5:39
- Label: Prelude
- Songwriters: Giorgio Moroder, Pete Bellotte
- Producer: Giorgio Moroder

Madleen Kane singles chronology
"Boogie Talk" (1980)	"You Can" (1981)	"Fire in My Heart" (1981)

"You Can" is a 1981 single by Madleen Kane and produced by Giorgio Moroder. The song was written by Giorgio Moroder and Pete Bellotte. Along with the track, "Fire in My Heart", "You Can" was Kane's most successful single on the dance chart, spending three weeks at number one. The single was her only Hot 100 chart entry, peaking at #77.

== Charts ==
=== Weekly charts ===
Chart (1981)	Peak position
US Billboard Hot 100	77
US Dance Club Songs (Billboard)	1
