= Robbie Leslie =

Robbie Leslie was one of a small group of popular and influential disc jockeys working in the New York area, Florida, and The Coast in the 1970s, 1980s, and 1990s. Beginning his career at Fire Island's disco The Sandpiper, he moved to New York City in 1979. The list of clubs at which he regularly performed includes many well-known nightspots: Studio 54, Palladium, Underground, The Red Parrot, The Saint, and 12 West.

Leslie was one of the first major DJs to perform at multiple clubs weekly, at a time when management insisted on exclusive control of their artists. This freelance practice is still customary among DJs today.

He was also the prototype of the modern "circuit party DJ", travelling internationally to spin at special one-night party extravaganzas, events, and fund-raisers. He would continue as a circuit regular until 2002.

He was the last of 10 renowned disc jockeys performing at the marathon 40-hour closing party of New York's private club, The Saint, 30 April-2 May 1988.

In 2005, he celebrated thirty years in the night club business, and continues to perform in clubs around the country and internationally. He produces a weekly show on Sirius/XM Studio 54 Radio, "Robbie Leslie Presents" where he shares his classic recordings, current international shows, and legendary DJ showcases.
