= Sergio Mendes (1983 album) =

Studio album by Sérgio Mendes
- Released: 1983
- Recorded: 1983
- Studios: Kendun Recorders (Burbank, California); Redwing Studios (Tarzana, California)
- Genres: Pop; adult contemporary; soft rock
- Length: 34:30
- Label: A&M
- Producer: Sérgio Mendes (with Jose Quintana on track 9)

Sérgio Mendes chronology
Alegria (Sérgio Mendes album) (1980)	Sergio Mendes (1983)	Confetti (1984)

Singles from Sergio Mendes
- 1. "Never Gonna Let You Go" Released: April 1983; 2. "Rainbow's End" Released: August 1983

Sergio Mendes is an album by Brazilian keyboardist Sérgio Mendes, released in 1983 on A&M Records. It was his first top 40 album in nearly a decade and a half, his second self-titled album, and was accompanied by his biggest chart single ever, "Never Gonna Let You Go", a song written by Barry Mann and Cynthia Weil and with a lead vocal performed by Joe Pizzulo and Leeza Miller that reached No. 4 on the Billboard Hot 100. The album was released with Spanish-language versions of the songs as Picardía.

== Reception ==
Professional ratings
Review scores
Source	Rating
AllMusic	2/5 stars

Industry press reviews of the time were generally positive: Billboard magazine called it "a well-balanced mix of ballads and up-tempo Latin-tinged tracks", featuring "a more intense pop/r&b sound, not unlike Quincy Jones' work with James Ingram." Cashbox said the album's “wide variety of synthesizers, as well as horn and string sections on some numbers, give the foray a lush, full sound."

Alternatively, in his retrospective review of the album, AllMusic’s Richard S. Ginell gave it two stars (of a possible five). He took aim at the hit "Never Gonna Let You Go", calling it "a saccharine ballad, where Joe Pizzulo and Leza Miller sing their banalities while Sergio strums and comps on synthesizers". He was critical of the album as a whole too, saying "To say that anyone could have made this record may be overstating the case, but the fact is that there is no way of knowing that this is a Sergio Mendes record without looking at the jacket." While not reviewing the whole album, record producer and YouTube personality Rick Beato declared "Never Gonna Let You Go" "the most complicated hit song of all time".

== Track listing ==
1. "Voo Doo" (Douglas Brayfield, Ronaldo Monteiro De Souza, Ivan Lins, Vítor Martins) – 3:55
2. "Never Gonna Let You Go" (Barry Mann, Cynthia Weil) – 4:15
3. "My Summer Love" (Adrienne Anderson, Serge Gainsbourg, Alain Chamfort) – 4:00
4. "Carnaval Festa Do Interior" (Mary Ekler, Moraes Moreira, Abel Silva) – 3:50
5. "Rainbow's End" (Don Freeman, David Batteau) – 4:03
6. "Love Is Waiting" (David & Jenny Batteau, Don Freeman) – 3:47
7. "Dream Hunter" (Danny Sembello, Michael Sembello) – 3:02
8. "Life in the Movies" (Michael Sembello, Dennis Matkosky) – 3:52
9. "Sí Señor" (Juan Carlos Calderón) – 3:46

== Personnel ==
- Sérgio Mendes – keyboards (1, 4–6, 8), percussion (2–4, 6, 7, 9), acoustic piano (3, 7, 9), Fender Rhodes (3, 7, 9), synthesizers (3, 7, 9), arrangements (3, 7, 8), rhythm arrangements (4–6)
- Michael Boddicker – synthesizers (1, 8)
- Robbie Buchanan – acoustic piano (2, 5, 6), Fender Rhodes (2, 5, 6), synthesizers (2, 5, 6), arrangements (2), synthesizer horns and string arrangements (5, 6)
- Don Freeman – vocals (4), acoustic piano (5, 6), clavinet (5, 6), rhythm arrangements (5, 6)
- Ben Bridges – guitars (1, 4), rhythm arrangements (1)
- Michael Sembello – guitars (1, 4, 5–8), vocals, arrangements (3, 7, 8), rhythm arrangements (5, 6)
- Paul Jackson Jr. – guitars (2, 9)
- Michael Landau – guitar solo (2)
- John Pisano – guitars (9)
- Nathan Watts – bass (1, 3, 4, 9), rhythm arrangements (1)
- Nathan East – bass (2, 5, 6, 9)
- Louis Johnson – bass (7)
- Teo Lima – drums (1, 4, 7), percussion (7)
- John Robinson – drums (2, 3)
- Raymond Pounds – drums (5)
- Vinnie Colaiuta – drums (6)
- Carlos Vega – drums (8)
- Ed Greene – drums (9)
- Steve Forman – percussion (1, 2, 4, 6, 7, 9)
- Sebastiao Neto – percussion (1, 3, 4, 6, 7), "voo doo" man (1)
- Ron Powell – percussion (3)
- Edson Aparecido da Silva (AKA Cafe) – percussion (4)
- Ernie Watts – horns (1, 4), saxophone solo (1)
- Bill Reichenbach Jr. – horns (1, 4), tuba solo (4)
- Gary Grant – horns (1, 4)
- Jerry Hey – horns (1, 4), horn arrangements (1, 4)
- Juan Carlos Calderón – string arrangements (9)

Vocals

- Leeza Miller – vocal solo (1), vocals (1, 2, 4, 6, 8), backing vocals (5, 8)
- Carol Rogers – vocal solo (1), vocals (1, 4), backing vocals (5, 8)
- Gracinha Leporace – vocals (1, 3), backing vocals (5, 8)
- Geoff Lieb – vocals (1, 4)
- Bill Martin – vocals (1, 4)
- Robert Martin – vocals (1, 4)
- Suzanne Wallach – vocals (1, 4), backing vocals (5)
- Joe Pizzulo – vocals (2)
- Michael Sembello - vocals (3)
- Danny Sembello – vocals (5)
- Cruz Baca – backing vocals (8)

Production

- Sérgio Mendes – producer
- José Quintana – producer (9)
- Geoff Gillette – recording (1, 2, 4–7, 9)
- Larry Hinds – recording (3, 8)
- Tim Dennen – assistant engineer
- Benny Faccone – assistant engineer
- Bob Winard – assistant engineer
- Bruce Swedien – mixing
- Bernie Grundman – mastering at A&M Studios (Hollywood, California)
- Chuck Beeson – art direction
- Melanie Nissen – design
- Otto Stupakoff – photography

== Charts ==
Chart performance for Sergio Mendes
Chart (1983)	Peak position
US Billboard 200	27
US Billboard R&B Albums	22
US Cash Box Albums	33
