= Jim Burgess (producer) =

American DJ and record producer

James Michael Burgess (July 21, 1953 – January 18, 1993) was a disco record producer and New York DJ of the 1970s. He was openly gay.

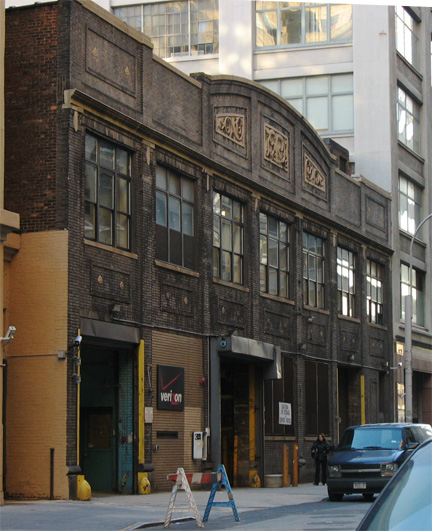
The former home of the Paradise Garage on King Street.

He remixed and produced numerous disco versions of popular songs, with a number of them being million sellers. His most successful and best known production was Alicia Bridges' I Love the Nightlife, which has become a "Disco standard". First released in 1978, it went to number five on the Billboard charts, and was given a new lease of life with its use in the 1994 film The Adventures of Priscilla, Queen of the Desert. Other successful productions included:

- Rod Stewart's Da Ya Think I'm Sexy?
- The Doobie Brothers' What a Fool Believes (12" disco remix version) and
- Madleen Kane's Fire In My Heart and Secret Love Affair

He was also a popular DJ at several New York clubs (including The Saint) and was "one of the most influential remixers for the disco era".

== Early years ==
Burgess was born on July 21, 1953, in Okeechobee, Florida. He trained as a classical tenor and opera singer, and was described as having "an amazing ear". He began his career as a DJ in Florida in the early-mid 1970s and then moved onto Limelight, a gay club in Atlanta, Georgia, where he was "discovered" by Tony Martino and Alan Harris, the owners of the New York club 12 West.

== New York ==
Burgess subsequently returned to New York where he played at "all the hottest clubs like 12 West, Infinity, the Saint, Underground, Studio 54, Paradise Garage, as well as playing the Ice Palace in Fire Island". He had been one of the initial three resident DJs at the Saint along with Alan Dodd and Roy Thode, from its opening on 20 September 1980.

Burgess's popularity was attributed not only to his style and technique, but a love for theatrical effects and elements, which developed from his love of opera. He would frequently create his own "sound scenes" by using the dialogue from well-known films over the break of a record - as well as accentuating the effect through long mixes and sophisticated blending.

Burgess chose to end his career at age 28 with a farewell party at The Saint on 31 January 1981. During the party, he walked out at the peak of the night and let the record run out. Nevertheless, he still did continue to perform in a few infrequent gigs in New York, and started playing regularly at The Saint again in 1986. His last gig according to his partner was at The Ice Palace in 1989.

== Philadelphia ==
After commuting back and forth from New York to Philadelphia, in 1987 he made a permanent move to pursue his first ambition, opera singing. In studied voice in Philadelphia at the Curtis Institute of Music, and sang with the Opera Company of Philadelphia and the Rittenhouse Opera Society - appearing as Florestan in Beethoven's "Fidelio" at the Lake George Opera Festival in New York and as Siegfried and Parsifal with the Liederkranz Society of New York, which awarded him first prize in its Wagner Competition in 1987.

== Death ==
Although he was never formally diagnosed with AIDS, Burgess took ill soon after Labor Day in 1992. It was then that he was informed of his HIV status. His illness progressed very quickly and he died of progressive multifocal leukoencephalopathy, an AIDS-related opportunistic infection four months after taking ill, on 18 January 1993 at his home in Philadelphia. He was survived by his partner, Martin Dillon, his sister, Dawn Burgess-Krop of Gainesville, Fl, and his brother, Jonathan, of Asheville, N.C.

== Discography ==
=== Remixes ===
Some of the more notable singles that Burgess was involved in the remixing and/or production of are:

Song title	Artist	Label	Released
"I love the nightlife"	Alicia Bridges	Polydor	1978
"Just As Long As We're Together"	Prince	Warner Brothers	1978
"Symphony of love"	Miquel Brown	Polydor	1978
"Da ya think I'm sexy"	Rod Stewart		1978
"I Was Made for Lovin' You"	KISS	Casablanca	1979
"Here comes that sound again"	Love De-Luxe		1979
"the Beat goes on and on"	Ripple	Canadian Unidisc	
"What a fool believes" (12" Disco mix)	The Doobie Brothers	Warner Bros	1979
"Rough Diamond"	Madleen Kane	Warner Bros	1978
"Forbidden Love"	Madleen Kane	Warner Bros	1979
"Night rider"	Venus Dodson		
"I've got the next dance"	Deniece Williams	Columbia	1979
"If there's love"	Amant		
"Crazy love"	Alton McClain & Destiny	Polydor	1979
"Lotta love"	Nicolette Larson	Warner Bros	1979
"Don't stop the train"	Phyliss Nelson		
"Runaway Love"	Linda Clifford	Curtom	1978
"A lover's holiday"	Change	Warner Bros RFC	1980
"Victim"	Candi Staton		1978
"No goodbyes"	Curtis Mayfield	Curtom	1978
"Party party"	Curtis Mayfield	Curtom	1978
"Try love"	Tony Wilson	US Bearsville	1979
"Lovemaker"	Wham	GRT records	1978
"Bring on the boys"	Karen Young		1978
