= Never Gonna Let You Go (Barry Mann and Cynthia Weil song) =

1982 song written by Barry Mann and Cynthia Weil

Song by Dionne Warwick

from the album Friends in Love
- Released: April 14, 1982
- Genre: R&B
- Length: 4:50
- Label: Arista
- Songwriters: Cynthia Weil, Barry Mann
- Producer: Jay Graydon

"Never Gonna Let You Go"

Song by Stevie Woods

from the album The Woman in My Life
- Released: 1982
- Genre: Soul, R&B
- Length: 4:54
- Label: Cotillion
- Songwriters: Cynthia Weil, Barry Mann
- Producer: Jack White

"Never Gonna Let You Go"

Single by Sérgio Mendes

from the album Sérgio Mendes
- B-side: "Carnaval"
- Released: April 1983
- Length: 4:15
- Label: A&M
- Songwriters: Cynthia Weil; Barry Mann
- Producer: Sérgio Mendes

Sérgio Mendes singles chronology
"Bridges" (1978)	"Never Gonna Let You Go" (1983)	"Voodoo" (1983)

"Never Gonna Let You Go" is a popular song from 1982, written by the husband-and-wife songwriting team of lyricist Cynthia Weil and composer Barry Mann. It was first recorded by Dionne Warwick for her 1982 album Friends in Love, and then by singer Stevie Woods for his 1982 album The Woman in My Life. The best known rendition, however, is sung by Joe Pizzulo and Leeza Miller on the 1983 self-titled album of Brazilian bandleader Sérgio Mendes.

Weil and Mann had originally submitted "Never Gonna Let You Go" to American funk band Earth, Wind & Fire, but they decided not to record the song.

Mendes, preparing for the release of his 1983 album, was quoted as saying, "All the other songs on the album were up and festive. I needed a ballad on the album, just to change the pace a bit." Mendes's version was a hit, matching the No. 4 peak of his previous best showing on the Billboard Hot 100 chart, Burt Bacharach's "The Look of Love", in 1968. It spent four weeks at No. 1 on the Billboard Adult Contemporary chart and peaked at No. 28 on the Billboard R&B chart.

On the Radio & Records airplay chart the Mendes single debuted at #26 in the May 13, 1983 issue; after six weeks it reached its peak at #7 for one week. It stayed in the top 10 for three weeks, remaining on the chart for twelve weeks. The song was successful, especially in Brazil, being played on Rede Globo's soap opera Final Feliz.

In a June 2021 video posted on YouTube, record producer Rick Beato called "Never Gonna Let You Go" "the most complex pop song of all time", due to its use of frequent key changes, inverted chords and unusual chord progressions. Beato's discussion includes a detailed harmonic analysis of the Sérgio Mendes arrangement.

== Chart performance ==
=== Weekly charts ===
Weekly chart performance for "Never Gonna Let You Go" by Sérgio Mendes
Chart (1983)	Peak position
Australia (Kent Music Report)	17
Belgium	35
Canada Top Singles (RPM)	5
Canada Adult Contemporary (RPM)	3
Ireland (IRMA)	14
Netherlands	26
South Africa (Springbok)	23
UK Singles (Official Charts)	45
US Billboard Hot 100	4
US Radio & Records CHR/Pop Airplay Chart	7
US Adult Contemporary (Billboard)	1
US Hot Black Singles (Billboard)	28
US Cash Box Top 100	3

=== Year-end charts ===
Year-end chart performance for "Never Gonna Let You Go" by Sérgio Mendes
Chart (1983)	Rank
Canada Top Singles (RPM)	52
US Billboard Hot 100	16
US Billboard Adult Contemporary	2

== See also ==
- List of Billboard Adult Contemporary number ones of 1983
