= Jay Scott (saxophonist) =

Jay Carrington Scott
- Born: March 13, 1952; Durham, North Carolina
- Died: September 3, 2009 (aged 57) Panama City, Florida
- Genres: southern rock; pop; disco
- Occupation: saxophonist

Jay Carrington Scott (1953–2009) was an American saxophone player whose solos were featured on many gold and platinum records of the late 1970s and early 1980s.

== Early life ==
Scott was born on March 13, 1952, in Durham, North Carolina, and in 1958, the family moved to East Point, Georgia, where his father worked a government job and moonlighted as an upright bass player. Scott's father honed in on Scott’s innate musical talent and ended up buying him a Music Minus One program for the saxophone. At nine years of age, Scott started playing saxophone. Scott's family relocated to St. Thomas, Virgin Islands for work and he continued to take in the music and culture of the Caribbean. His Anglican private school – All Saints – did not offer a full band for students. When Carnival time came and many of the other schools’ bands were featured in the annual parade, he ended up joining three other bands.

In 1968, the father moved the family to Dothan, Alabama. When young Jay tried to join the Dothan High School band, he was told “no” by the Band Director given his long hair. Jay found other avenues for musical expression. He connected with some of the young black musicians and they played various clubs in the Bottom, the predominantly black area of Dothan. They particularly found a home at Buier's Lounge. It was here where he found his sound which incorporated elements of funk, soul, rhythm and blues, and jazz. He was also known for intricate scale work which facilitated his solo playing.

== Career ==
After graduating from high school, Scott played saxophone with Mitch Goodson of MG and the K-PERS and they played Panama City beach on a regular basis. It was there that he was spotted by Sonny Turner. Sonny had recently left The Platters and was starting a solo career as Sonny Turner and Sound Unlimited; he hired Scott on the spot to go on tour and Scott traveled around the states. The band played Las Vegas a great deal and it was there that Scott was also hired to be in the house band for famous comedians like Rodney Dangerfield and Rich Little.

In the mid-'70s, Scott returned to Dothan. His sister Laura introduced him to musicians in the area. Scott was hired by the band Satyr.

In 1977, Scott decided to move to Atlanta to find session work. He played in the horn section on Lynyrd Skynyrd's song "What’s Your Name" (1977), produced by Tom Dowd.

Scott was then discovered by a young producer, Steve Buckingham, who enlisted him to play on a new disco record coming out on Polydor, featuring the 1978 single, Alicia Bridges’ “I Love the Nightlife.” Scott's solo on that song caught the attention of many musical admirers. His sister Linda, who was living in New York City at the time, remembers when Scott performed at the famous East Village club, The Bottom Line, backing Alicia Bridges. She explained that Scott had also struggled with Bells Palsy throughout his life and had learned how to play through muscle weakness on one side of his face. Despite this, Scott was able to learn to play two saxophones simultaneously through intentionally isolating his muscles. Scott featured this technique during The Bottom Line show, and according to Linda, the New York City audience leapt to their feet, cheering.

When the Grammys were held in 1978, “I Love the Nightlife” was nominated for best song and Alicia Bridges performed the song at the ceremony. After Scott’s success with Alicia Bridges, he soon garnered the attention of other music producers and recorded the featured sax solo on various gold and platinum records at this time: Melissa Manchester’s “Whenever I Call You Friend” (1979); Dione Warwick’s “Easy Love” (1980); Paul Davis’ “He Sang Our Love Songs” (1980); and Kansas.

Scott also recorded with other Dothan artists like John Rainey Adkins, David Adkins (sister Laura’s husband), and Rodney Justo who had gained commercial success in the late '70s with their band Beaverteeth. Scott was featured on their two albums: Beaverteeth ("I’m Callin", 1977) and Dam It ("Stop that River in Your Eye", 1978).

In the 1980s, Scott moved to Panama City Beach and played for more than two decades on the Emerald Coast. Using backing tracks, he played solo gigs and led other band configurations, as well as with the guitar player, Lowell Howell. He also began teaching and volunteered to teach children for free at the Martin Luther King Center. He married a local guitar-player/singer, Pat in 1993, while he continued his musical endeavors.

Besides his saxophone playing, Scott was a soul singer and also a multi-instrumentalist – playing flute, congas, and piano. He was plagued by various health problems, having been through a serious motorcycle accident which required a hip replacement.

== Death ==
On September 3, 2009, Scott died suddenly of a heart attack at the age of 57.
