= Friends in Love (Dionne Warwick album) =

Studio album by Dionne Warwick
- Released: April 14, 1982
- Studios: Garden Rake Studios (Sherman Oaks, California)
- Genres: Funk; soul; pop
- Length: 42:18
- Label: Arista
- Producer: Jay Graydon

Dionne Warwick chronology
Hot! Live and Otherwise (1981)	Friends in Love (1982)	Heartbreaker (1982)

Singles from Friends in Love
- 1. "Friends in Love" Released: April 1982; 2. "For You" Released: July 1982

Professional ratings
Review scores
Source	Rating
AllMusic	3/5 stars
The Rolling Stone Album Guide	3/5 stars

Friends in Love is a studio album by the American singer Dionne Warwick. It was released by Arista Records on April 14, 1982, in the United States. Her fourth album for the label, it was recorded during the winter of 1981-82, with production by Jay Graydon. It peaked at number 87 on the US Billboard Top LPs & Tape chart. Singles from the album include the title track, a duet with singer Johnny Mathis, which reached the top 40 on the US Billboard Hot 100 and follow-up "For You", which peaked at number 14 on the Adult Contemporary chart.

== Track listing ==
All tracks produced by Jay Graydon.

Side one
No.	Title	Writer(s)	Length
1.	"For You"	Jay Graydon; Richard Page; John Bettis	4:55
2.	"Friends in Love" (with Johnny Mathis)	Graydon; David Foster; Bill Champlin	4:02
3.	"Never Gonna Let You Go"	Barry Mann; Cynthia Weil	4:50
4.	"Can't Hide Love"	Skip Scarborough	4:50
5.	"Betcha by Golly Wow"	Thomas Bell; Linda Creed	3:28

Side two
No.	Title	Writer(s)	Length
6.	"More Than Fascination"	Tom Snow	4:02
7.	"Got You Where I Want You" (with Johnny Mathis)	Candy Parton; Jim Andron	3:38
8.	"With a Touch"	Stevie Wonder	4:40
9.	"What Is This"	Myra Waters; Graydon	3:58
10.	"A Love So Right"	Gloria Sklerov; Harry Lloyd	3:55

== Personnel and credits ==
Musicians

- Dionne Warwick – lead vocals
- David Foster – Rhodes electric piano (1, 4, 7), acoustic piano (2, 4, 7, 10), synthesizers (7)
- Steve Porcaro – Rhodes electric piano (1), synthesizers (1, 7)
- Jay Graydon – synthesizers (1, 6, 7), guitars (1–4, 6–8, 10), percussion (3)
- Robbie Buchanan – acoustic piano (3, 6), Rhodes electric piano (3, 5), synthesizers (5, 6)
- Michael Boddicker – synthesizers (5, 8, 9)
- Steve George – synthesizers (6, 8), Rhodes electric piano (8)
- Michael Omartian – synthesizers (8, 10), acoustic piano (9)
- Stevie Wonder – acoustic piano (8)
- Dean Parks – acoustic guitar (3)
- Steve Lukather – guitars (4)
- Larry Carlton – acoustic guitar (5)
- Marty Walsh – electric guitar (5)
- Michael Landau – guitars (9)
- Abraham Laboriel – bass (1, 4, 7, 10)
- Mike Porcaro – bass (2, 3, 5, 8, 9)
- Steve Gadd – drums (1, 4)
- Mike Baird – drums (2, 3, 5–8, 10)
- Jeff Porcaro – drums (9)
- Victor Feldman – percussion (2, 10)
- Charles Loper – trombone
- Chuck Findley – trumpet
- Gary Grant – trumpet
- Jerry Hey – trumpet, flugelhorn (3, 7)
- Assa Drori – string concertmaster (1–4, 9, 10)

Background vocalists

- Steve George – backing vocals (1)
- Richard Page – backing vocals (1–9)
- Johnny Mathis – lead vocals (2, 7)
- Bill Champlin – backing vocals (2–9)
- Venette Gloud – backing vocals (2–9)
- Carmen Twillie – backing vocals (6)

Music arrangements

- Jay Graydon – rhythm arrangements
- Jerry Hey – horn arrangements
- Johnny Mandel – string arrangements (1)
- David Foster – string arrangements (2, 4)
- Jeremy Lubbock – string arrangements (2–4)
- Robbie Buchanan – synthesizer arrangements (5)
- Michael Omartian – string arrangements (9, 10)

Production

- Jay Graydon – producer, engineer, mixing
- Ian Eales – engineer, mixing
- Al Schmitt – string recording at Capitol Studios (Hollywood, California)
- Donn Davenport – art direction
- David Vance – photography
- John Pinderhughes – inner sleeve photography
- Clifford Peterson – hair stylist

== Charts ==
Chart (1982)	Peak position
Australian Albums (Kent Music Report)	72
US Top LPs & Tape (Billboard)	83
US Soul LPs (Billboard)	33
US Top 100 Albums (Cash Box)	95
US Top 75 Black Contemporary Albums (Cash Box)	24
