= Dionne (1979 album) =

Studio album by Dionne Warwick
- Released: May 1979
- Studio: United Western Recorders (Hollywood, California)
- Genre: R&B, pop, disco
- Length: 39:24
- Label: Arista
- Producer: Barry Manilow

Dionne Warwick chronology
Love at First Sight (1977)	Dionne (1979)	No Night So Long (1980)

Singles from Dionne
- 1. "I'll Never Love This Way Again" Released: July 15, 1979; 2. "Deja Vu" Released: November 1979; 3. "After You" Released: March 1980

Professional ratings
Review scores
Source	Rating
AllMusic	2/5 stars
Christgau's Record Guide	C+
The Rolling Stone Album Guide	2.5/5 stars

Dionne is a studio album by American singer Dionne Warwick. It was released by Arista Records in May 1979 in the United States. Recorded during the winter of 1978–79, the album marked Warwick's debut with the label. Production on Dionne was helmed by Barry Manilow, who was paired with Warwick by Arista founder Clive Davis. Her highest-charting album since Soulful (1969), Dionne peaked at number 12 on the US Billboard 200 album chart and went platinum in the US.

Lead single "I'll Never Love This Way Again" became a major hit, reaching number five on the US Billboard Hot 100. The song was certified gold by the Recording Industry Association of America (RIAA), and both it and follow-up hit "Deja Vu" became Grammy Award winners at the 1980 ceremony. "After You," Dionne's's third top ten single and "Feeling Old Feelings" were also released as singles, with the latter receiving a Japanese release only. Her performance of the song earned Warwick the grand prize at the Tokyo Music Festival for Song of the Year.

== Track listing ==
All tracks produced by Barry Manilow.

Side one
No.	Title	Writer(s)	Length
1.	"Who, What, When, Where, Why"	Rupert Holmes	3:15
2.	"After You"	Doug Frank; Doug James	4:02
3.	"The Letter"	Wayne Carson Thompson	3:11
4.	"I'll Never Love This Way Again"	Richard Kerr; Will Jennings	3:33
5.	"Déjà Vu"	Isaac Hayes; Adrienne Anderson	4:06

Side two
No.	Title	Writer(s)	Length
6.	"Feeling Old Feelings"	Danny Hice; Chip Hardy	4:03
7.	"In Your Eyes"	Barry Manilow; Bruce Sussman; Jack Feldman	3:43
8.	"My Everlasting Love"	Rick Sandler; Jeanne FitzSimmons; Con Cowan	4:23
9.	"Out of My Hands"	Cissy Houston; Alvin Fields; Frank	3:17
10.	"All the Time"	Manilow; Marty Panzer	4:06

Déjà Vu – The Arista Recordings (2020) bonus tracks
No.	Title	Writer(s)	Length
11.	"Never Gonna Let You Get Away"	Manilow	3:38
12.	"The Last One to Be Loved"	Burt Bacharach; Hal David	2:58
13.	"Never Gonna Let You Get Away" (Duet Version featuring Barry Manilow)	Manilow	3:48

== Personnel and credits ==
Musicians

- Dionne Warwick – lead vocals, backing vocals (1, 3, 9)
- Barry Manilow – acoustic piano, rhythm track arrangements, backing vocals (2–6, 8, 10)
- Bill Mays – keyboards
- Mitch Holder – guitars
- Will Lee – bass
- Rick Shlosser – drums
- Alan Estes – percussion
- Sid Sharp – concertmaster
- Shaun Harris – contractor
- Greg Mathieson – orchestration (1, 6)
- Gene Page – orchestration (2, 5, 9, 10)
- Artie Butler – orchestration (3, 4)
- Jimmie Haskell – orchestration (7, 8)
- Ron Dante – backing vocals (2–6, 8, 10)

Production

- Barry Manilow – producer
- Michael DeLugg – engineer
- Peter Darmi – assistant engineer
- Paul Brownstein – production assistant
- Donn Davenport – art direction
- Harry Langdon – photography
- Jay Thompson – insert photography
- Clifford Peterson – hair stylist

== Charts ==
=== Weekly charts ===
Weekly chart performance for Dionne
Chart (1979)	Peak position
Australian Albums (Kent Music Report)	35
Canada Top 100 Albums (RPM)	33
US Top LPs & Tape (Billboard)	12
US Soul LPs (Billboard)	10
US Top 100 Albums (Cash Box)	14
US Top 75 Black Contemporary Albums (Cash Box)	12
US The Album Chart (Record World)	15
US Black Oriented Album Chart (Record World)	12

=== Year-end charts ===
1979 year-end chart performance for Dionne
Chart (1979)	Position
US Top LPs & Tape (Billboard)	93
US Top 100 Albums (Cash Box)	79
US Top 75 Black Contemporary Albums (Cash Box)	37

1980 year-end chart performance for Dionne
Chart (1980)	Position
US Top LPs & Tape (Billboard)	36
US Soul LPs (Billboard)	27

== Certifications and sales ==
Certifications for Dionne
Region	Certification	Certified units/sales
United States (RIAA)	Platinum	1,000,000^{^}
^{^} Shipments figures based on certification alone.
