= Bruce Mailman =

American theatre owner (1939–1994)

- Born: 1939
- Died: June 9, 1994 (aged 54–55)
- Education: Temple University (BA); New York University (MFA)

Bruce Mailman (1939-June 9, 1994) was an East Village entrepreneur, Off-Broadway theatre-owner and founder of The Saint and New St. Marks Baths.

He graduated from Temple University and received a master's degree in dramatic literature from New York University.

In 1965, Mailman bought two buildings on Astor Place and converted them into the Astor Place Theatre. He also established the Truck and Warehouse Theater on East Fourth Street, Manhattan, which now houses the New York Theatre Workshop.

In 1979, he bought the building that would become the New Saint Marks Baths at 6 St. Marks Place. He sought to provide a cleaner environment for a gay bathhouse than had been the case prior. He claimed it was the largest bathhouse in the world and in 1981 bought the neighboring 8 St. Marks with hopes of doubling the size.

In 1980, he bought the Fillmore East and converted it to The Saint club.

Both institutions would run into trouble with the advent of the AIDS crisis.

Mailman died of AIDS in 1994.
