= Now We're Starting Over Again =

Original song by Dionne Warwick, later popularized by Natalie Cole

Single by Dionne Warwick

from the album Hot! Live and Otherwise
- B-side: "Hit Record Medley (Anyone Who Had a Heart, The Look of Love, Make It Easy on Yourself)"
- Released: August 1981
- Recorded: 1981
- Genre: Pop; soul
- Length: 3:08
- Label: Arista
- Songwriters: Gerry Goffin; Michael Masser
- Producer: Michael Masser

"Starting Over Again"

Single by Natalie Cole

from the album Good to Be Back
- B-side: "I Do" (duet with Freddie Jackson)
- Released: 1989
- Genre: R&B; soul
- Length: 4:13
- Label: EMI
- Songwriters: Gerry Goffin; Michael Masser
- Producers: Michael Masser; Gerry Goffin

Natalie Cole singles chronology
"As a Matter of Fact" (1989)	"Starting Over Again" (1989)	"Wild Women Do" (1990)

"Now We're Starting Over Again" is a ballad composed by Michael Masser and lyricist Gerry Goffin and first recorded by Dionne Warwick in 1981. The song was most successful as a 1989 single release by Natalie Cole.

== Background ==
"Now We're Starting Over Again" was one of five studio recordings by Dionne Warwick to augment the concert tracks on her 1981 album Hot! Live and Otherwise: three of these studio tracks were produced and co-written by Michael Masser being – besides "Now We're Starting Over Again" – "There's a Long Road Ahead of Us" (also co-written with Gerry Goffin) and "Some Changes Are for Good" (co-written with Carole Bayer Sager), with the latter two tracks being chosen for single release in the US. Also, "Now We're Starting Over Again" was afforded a single release in some countries though without becoming a major hit, with its only evident chart showing being in the UK where it peaked at No. 76.

== Charts ==
Chart (1981)	Peak position
UK Singles Chart	76

== Natalie Cole version ==
Natalie Cole's version of "Now We're Starting Over Again" (simply titled as "Starting Over Again") was released in late 1989 in the UK and early 1990 in the U.S., being the fifth of five singles released from her 1989 album Good to Be Back, the first of which, "Miss You Like Crazy" (#7 on the Hot 100 / #1 R&B), also a Michael Masser production and co-write, becoming Cole's second major hit produced by Masser and written by Masser and Gerry Goffin, with the first being "Someone That I Used to Love" in 1980 (#21 Hot 100 / #21 R&B). "Starting Over Again" did not afford Cole a Hot 100 or R&B hit but did chart on Billboard magazine's Adult Contemporary chart at number five, while also reaching number 12 on the Canadian Adult Contemporary chart. "Starting Over Again" was also a minor hit in the UK (#56). The B-side of the single was Cole's duet with Freddie Jackson entitled "I Do" which in a previous release had been a top ten R&B chart hit.

=== Charts ===
Chart (1989–90)	Peak position
Canada Adult Contemporary (RPM)	12
US Adult Contemporary (Billboard)	5
UK Singles Chart	56

== Other versions ==
- Filipino singer Lani Misalucha recorded "Starting Over Again" for the 2014 film of the same name.
