= After You (Dionne Warwick song) =

Single by Dionne Warwick

from the album Dionne
- B-side: "Out of My Hands"
- Released: March 1980
- Length: 4:02 (album version); 3:37 (7" version)
- Label: Arista
- Songwriter(s): Doug Frank; Doug James
- Producer(s): Barry Manilow

Dionne Warwick singles chronology
"Déjà Vu" (1979)	"After You" (1980)	"No Night So Long" (1980)

Music video
- "After You" (1980 Solid Gold TV performance) on YouTube

"After You" is a song recorded by Dionne Warwick for her 1979 album Dionne: released as the album's third single in the spring of 1980, "After You" would peak at number 65 on the U.S. Billboard Hot 100. It also reached number 10 on the Adult Contemporary chart.

"After You" had first been recorded by Warwick's aunt Cissy Houston in 1978 for her album Think It Over, the song's composers: Doug Frank and Doug James, being staff writers for Love-Zager Productions, which firm produced Houston's album. However Frank and James had written "After You" in hopes of having Barry Manilow record it: receiving a demo of the song from its composers, Manilow—who was producing the Dionne album—had Warwick record the song.

The song was also recorded by the Manhattans for their 1979 album Love Talk, and by Chuck Jackson for his 1980 album I Wanna Give You Some Love.

== Charts ==
=== Weekly charts ===
Chart (1980)	Peak position
Canadian Top Singles (RPM)	85
US Billboard Hot 100	65
US Adult Contemporary (Billboard)	10
US Hot R&B/Hip-Hop Songs (Billboard)	33
US Cashbox Top 100	79
