= No Night So Long (song) =

Single by Dionne Warwick

from the album No Night So Long
- B-side: "Reaching for the Sky"
- Released: July 1980
- Recorded: 1980
- Genre: Easy Listening, Pop
- Length: 3:26
- Label: Arista Records
- Composer: Richard Kerr
- Lyricist: Will Jennings
- Producer: Steve Buckingham

Dionne Warwick singles chronology
"After You" (1980)	"No Night So Long" (1980)	"Easy Love" (1980)

"No Night So Long" is the title track of a 1980 album by Dionne Warwick, written by Richard Kerr and Will Jennings and produced by Steve Buckingham. "No Night So Long" peaked at number 23 on the Billboard Hot 100, number 19 on Hot Soul Singles and spent three weeks at number 1 on the Adult Contemporary chart. It was Warwick's third number one on the AC chart.

== Track listing and formats ==
- US 7" Vinyl single

A. "No Night So Long" – 3:26
B. "Reaching for the Sky" – 4:28

== Charts ==
=== Weekly charts ===
Chart (1980)	Peak position
Canadian Adult Contemporary (RPM)	3
US Billboard Hot 100	23
US Adult Contemporary (Billboard)	1
US Hot R&B/Hip-Hop Songs (Billboard)	19

== See also ==
- List of number-one adult contemporary singles of 1980 (U.S.)
