= New St. Marks Baths =

The New St. Marks Baths
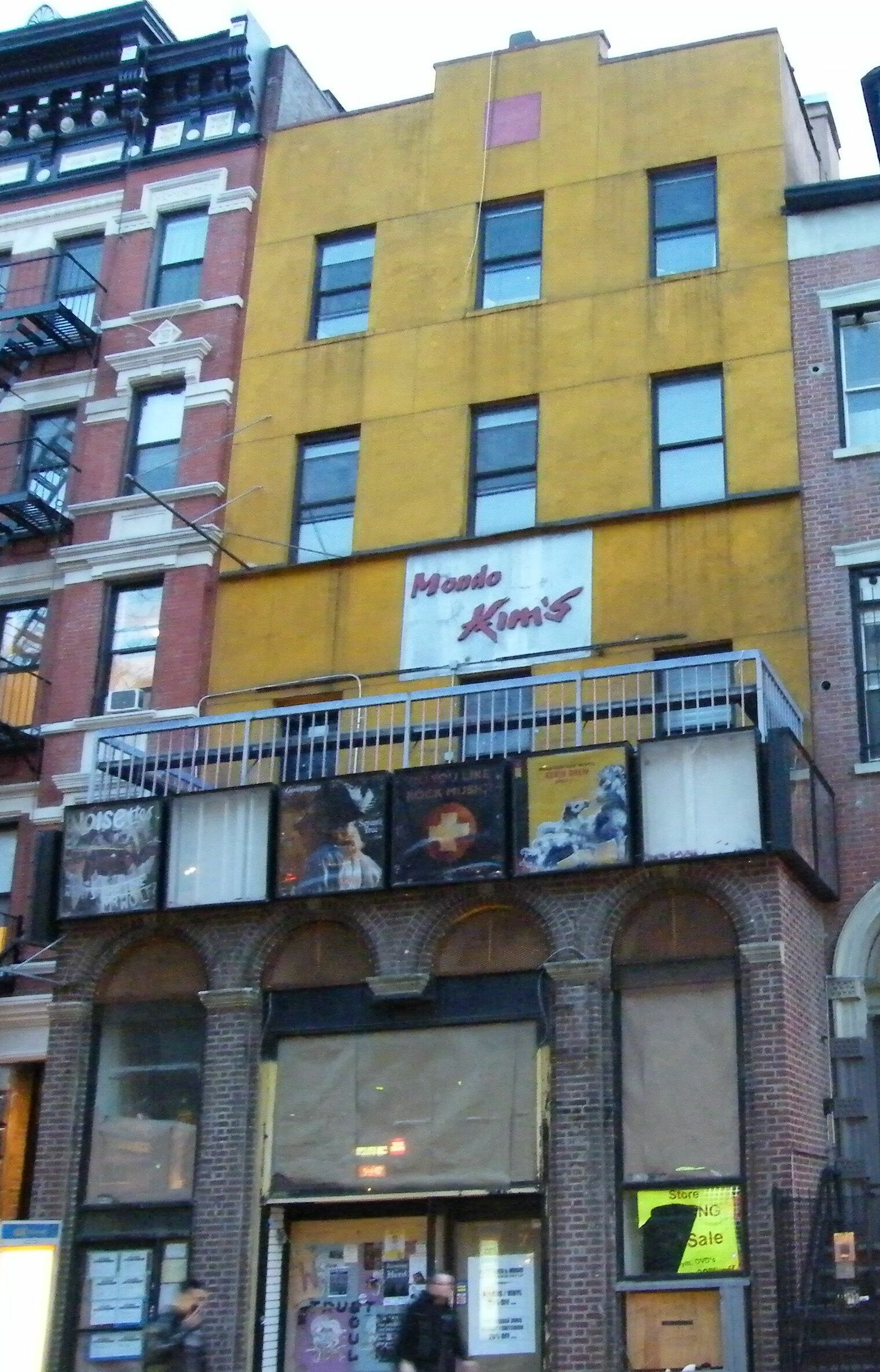
- Site of the bathhouse in 2009, then occupied by Kim's Video and Music
- Former names: The Saint Marks Baths

General information
- Type: Gay bathhouse
- Location: Manhattan, New York City, New York
- Address: 6 St. Marks Place
- Country: United States
- Coordinates: 40°43′45″N 73°59′22″W
- Opened: 1913
- Renovated: 1979
- Closed: December 9, 1985
- Owner: Bruce Mailman

Other information
- Facilities: private rooms, sauna

The New St. Marks Baths was a gay bathhouse at 6 St. Marks Place in the East Village of Manhattan, New York City from 1979 to 1985. It claimed to be the largest gay bath house in the world.

The Saint Marks Baths opened in the location in 1913. Through the 1950s, it operated as a Victorian-style Turkish bath catering to Russian-Jewish immigrants on New York's Lower East Side. In the 1950s, it began to have a homosexual clientele at night. In the 1960s, it became exclusively gay.

In 1979, the bathhouse was refurbished, and the name was changed to the New Saint Marks Baths. In 1981, the neighboring building was purchased, with plans to expand.

The AIDS epidemic caused some activists such as Larry Kramer to urge its closing.. In October 1985, an emergency resolution updating the New York Sanitary Code (10 NYCRR) § 24.2, authorized the New York City Department of Health to close any facilities "in which high risk sexual activity takes place." Despite providing information on AIDS and condoms to all patrons, the New St. Mark's Baths was closed permanently on December 7, 1985.
