= Even a Fool Would Let Go =

Song written by Tom Snow and Kerry Chater

Song
- Genre: Country
- Songwriter(s): Tom Snow; Kerry Chater

"Even a Fool Would Let Go" is a country and pop song by songwriters Tom Snow and Kerry Chater (a former member of Gary Puckett & The Union Gap). The song lyrics meditate on a tempting but imprudent and perhaps adulterous ("neither one of us is free") love affair. The first recording of the song was by Gayle McCormick (formerly of the band Smith) on her 1974 solo album One More Hour.

== Cover versions ==
In late 1976 Charlie Rich recorded the song at Columbia Recording Studio in Nashville with Billy Sherrill producing: the track was issued on Rich's final album for Epic Records Take Me (1977) and in March 1977 had a UK single release. Kerry Chater himself recorded the song for his 1977 Part Time Love album. In April 1980 Epic gave Rich's version a belated US single release (possibly due to recordings issued by Dolly Parton and Conway Twitty/Loretta Lynn as album cuts around that time - as well as the longstanding popularity of a 1978 Kenny Rogers album on which it was also featured), resulting in minor C&W hit status (number 61). The song had had a previous single release via an overlooked version by Ava Barber released June 1979.

Other versions of "Even a Fool Would Let Go" have been recorded by B. J. Thomas (album B. J. Thomas/ 1977), Kenny Rogers (album Love or Something Like It 1978), Conway Twitty and Loretta Lynn (album Diamond Duet 1980), Dolly Parton (album Dolly, Dolly, Dolly 1980), Debby Boone (album Love Has No Reason which takes its name from the song's lyrics, 1980), Frederick Knight (album Knight Time, 1981), Nana Mouskouri (album Nana 1981), Dionne Warwick (album Hot! Live and Otherwise 1981), Gloria Gaynor (album Gloria Gaynor 82 1982), Levon Helm (album Levon Helm 1982), The Marshall Tucker Band (album Tuckerized 1982), Joe Cocker (album Civilized Man 1984), John Anderson (album Tokyo, Oklahoma 1985), and Gregson & Collister (album Love is a Strange Hotel 1990).
