= Madleen Kane =

Swedish model and singer

- Born: 4 March 1958 (age 68)
- Genres: dance music
- Instrument: vocals
- Labels: CBS; Prelude Records

Madleen Kane (born Madeleine Flerkell, 4 March 1958), is a Swedish model and singer. A former Elite fashion model (height 180 cm / 5'11" - weight 47 kg / 103 lbs), she worked since age 17 for the German fashion magazine Burda Moden. She was published seminaked in two issues of Playboy magazine (in April 1978 for the French edition and in April 1979 for the Spanish edition). In addition, she had five top-ten hits on the US Hot Dance Music/Club Play chart in the late 1970s and early 1980s.

== Biography and career ==
Madleen Kane was born Madeleine Flerkell in Malmö, Sweden. At the age of 20, she was discovered by J. C. Friederich, owner of Boona Music productions. She became a popular singer working in 1978 with her album Rough Diamond, which became a global hit. After she released Cheri in 1979, her singing career took off. Kane's debut album Rough Diamond (1978) was originally released in France by CBS and soon after by Warner Bros. in North America. It became a hit on the Billboard Dance Chart. For this album, she recorded a disco version of C'est si bon. Paris-based production team Michaele, Lana & Paul Sébastian produced the album. They have also worked with Theo Vaness and on "Argentina Forever" by Pacific Blue.

Cheri (1979) was Kane's second CBS Disques/Warner Bros. release and featured "Forbidden Love", a dramatic "pop-opus" arranged by Thor Baldursson. The A-side suite of "Forbidden Love", the title track, its breakdown "Fire In My Heart" and "Secret Love Affair" gave her another club hit, which ran for over 15 minutes. Jim Burgess remixed it for a single, which was edited to just over eight minutes.

Unlike the North American albums, the French releases of Rough Diamond and Cheri had gatefold sleeves. In addition, the American mix of "Forbidden Love" is different from that released in other countries. The track "I Want You, Need You, Love You" was omitted from the North American release.

At the beginning of the 1980s, Kane moved to Chalet Records, part of Prelude Records, and released her third album, Sounds of Love (1980). It featured "Cherchez pas", which was more "electronic" as opposed to her usual symphonic disco songs, and peaked at No. 18 in Sweden. Kane later worked with producers Giorgio Moroder and Pete Bellotte. Nevertheless, Moroder appeared with his mixes in 1981 with "Don't Wanna Lose You" and helped her album sales via the clubs, but not radio airplay. "You Can" (1981), the Flashdance-esque lead single from those sessions spent three weeks atop the Billboard Dance charts. It also peaked at number 77 on the Billboard Hot 100 in February 1982 and was Kane's only entry on that chart. The album Don't Wanna Lose You followed. This was again released on Chalet Records, which was owned by her then-husband Jean-Claude Friederich and distributed by dance promoter Tom Hayden and his TSR Record Company, which was to be Madleen's next record label. Other hits were "Playing for Time," "You Can," "I'm No Angel," and "Fire in My Heart".

London's Ian Anthony Stephens and Megatone recording artist Paul Parker teamed up to provide Kane with "I'm No Angel", a Billboard dance hit from her 1985 album, Cover Girl. Madleen stopped her career as family life became her priority and she raised three children.

A collection of her hits, 12 Inches and More (1994) was her final release. 12 Inches and More does not feature any of the extended mixes from her early career. Album versions are used in place of the remixes, possibly due to licensing issues. In January 2010, Madleen's first two albums were reissued on the MP3 via Amazon.com.

In 2011, Gold Legion reissued her album Rough Diamond on CD.

In 2018 she self-published her memoir Rough Diamond through Mindstir Media.

== Discography ==
=== Albums ===
- Rough Diamond (1978) Warner Bros.
- Cheri (1979) Warner Bros.
- Sounds of Love (1980) Chalet
- Don't Wanna Lose You (1981) Chalet
- Cover Girl (1985) TSR
- 12 Inches and More (1994) TSR

=== Singles ===
- "Rough Diamond" (1978)
- "Fever" (1978)
- "Touch My Heart" (1979)
- "Forbidden Love" (1979)
- "You and I" (1979)
- "Secret Love Affair" (1979)
- "Cheri" (1979)
- "Cherchez Pas" (1980)
- "Boogie Talk" (1980)
- "You Can" (1981)
- "Fire In My Heart" (1981)
- "Playing For Time" (1982)
- "On Fire" (1985)
- "Ecstasy" (1985)
- "I'm No Angel" (1985)

== Charts ==
Year	Title	Peak chart positions				Album
Year	Title	SWE	AUS	CAN Dance	US Dance	Album
1978	"Rough Diamond / Fever / Touch My Heart"	—	—	—	3	Rough Diamond
1978	"Fever / Rough Diamond"	—	—	19	—	Rough Diamond
1978	"Rough Diamond / C'est si bon"	—	—	9	—	Rough Diamond
1979	"Forbidden Love / Secret Love Affair (Medley)"	—	93	—	3	Cheri
1980	"Cherchez pas / Boogie Talk"	18	—	—	9	Sounds of Love
1981	"You Can / Fire in My Heart"	—	—	—	1	Don't Wanna Lose You
1982	"Playing for Time"	—	—	—	10	Don't Wanna Lose You
1985	"I'm No Angel / Ecstacy"	—	—	—	21	Cover Girl
"—" denotes the single failed to chart or was not released.

== See also ==
- List of artists who reached number one on the US Dance chart
