= I'll Never Love This Way Again =

1978 song popularized by Dionne Warwick

Single by Dionne Warwick

from the album Dionne
- B-side: "In Your Eyes"
- Released: July 15, 1979
- Genre: Soul
- Length: 3:30
- Label: Arista
- Songwriters: Richard Kerr; Will Jennings
- Producer: Barry Manilow

Dionne Warwick singles chronology
"Only Love Can Break a Heart" (1977)	"I'll Never Love This Way Again" (1979)	"Déjà Vu" (1979)

Music video
- "I'll Never Love This Way Again" on YouTube

"I'll Never Love This Way Again" is a song written and composed by English musician Richard Kerr and American lyricist Will Jennings, and first recorded by Kerr himself for his album Welcome to the Club as "I Know I'll Never Love This Way Again", released in November 1978. A version by Cheryl Ladd was released first on her self-titled album in July 1978. The song became a hit for American singer Dionne Warwick the following year, which was produced by her labelmate Barry Manilow for Warwick's Arista Records debut, Dionne. It was also recorded by British singer Cherrill Rae Yates.

The song was released as the album's lead single on July 15, 1979, by Arista. Warwick's first single on the record label after an unsuccessful tenure at Warner Bros. Records, the song brought Warwick renewed popularity when it reached number 5 on the US Billboard Hot 100 and number 8 in Canada, also peaking at number 18 on the Hot Soul Singles chart. "I'll Never Love This Way Again" was eventually certified as gold by the RIAA for sales of over one million copies and won Warwick the 1980 Grammy Award for Best Female Pop Vocal Performance.

In 1992, the song was covered in Spanish as "Cómo te amé" by Mexican singer Yuri, from her album Obsesiones. This version peaked at number 34 on the Hot Latin Songs chart.

== Track listing and formats ==
- US 7" Vinyl single

A. "I'll Never Love This Way Again" – 3:28
B. "In Your Eyes" – 3:43

== Charts ==
=== Weekly charts ===
Chart (1979)	Peak position
Australia (Kent Music Report)	35
Belgium (Ultratop 50 Flanders)	20
Canadian Top Singles (RPM)	8
Canadian Adult Contemporary (RPM)	1
Netherlands (Single Top 100)	27
New Zealand (Recorded Music NZ)	24
South Africa (Springbok)	12
UK Singles (Official Charts)	62
US Billboard Hot 100	5
US Adult Contemporary (Billboard)	5
US Hot R&B/Hip-Hop Songs (Billboard)	18

=== Year-end charts ===
Chart (1979)	Rank
Canadian Top Singles (RPM)	51
US Billboard Hot 100	32
US Hot Soul Singles (Billboard)	35
US Adult Contemporary (Billboard)	12
US Cashbox Top 100	29

== Certifications ==
Region	Certification	Certified units/sales
United States (RIAA)	Gold	1,000,000^{^}
^{^} Shipments figures based on certification alone.
