= Michael Lippman =

American music manager (1946–2025)

- Born: Michael Bruce Lippman; August 8, 1946; Rochester, New York, U.S.
- Died: December 29, 2025 (aged 79); Santa Ynez, California, U.S.
- Occupation: Music manager
- Spouse: Nancy Harris (m. 1968)
- Children: 2

Michael Bruce Lippman (August 8, 1946 – December 29, 2025) was an American music manager. Over the course of his career he managed several major musicians and bands including David Bowie, George Michael, Matchbox Twenty (and its frontman Rob Thomas) and Melissa Manchester. Lippman worked with his artists through major milestones in their careers. He served as an attorney for entertainers before entering the management industry. He served as David Bowie's manager in the early 1970s and managed George Michael on two occasions: first in the late-1980s during his fame with his song "Faith", and then again in the mid-2000s.

== Early life ==
Lippman was born on August 8, 1946, in Rochester, New York, to Seymour Lippman and his wife Shirlie. He graduated from Ithaca College in New York before attending the American University Washington College of Law.

== Career ==
Once Lippman graduated, he began working for Creative Management Associates. He had become interested in the entertainment industry while on vacation in Los Angeles. After working with Hollywood stars, Lippman was tasked to work with rock musicians by his agency. He worked with artists such as Electric Light Orchestra and Bette Midler before parting ways with CMA to join the Cooper, Epstein, and Hurewitz law firm.

From 1971 until 1975, Lippman worked as David Bowie's attorney and manager. Described as his "breakthrough" in the music business, Lippman assisted Bowie through his release of the single Fame, his movie The Man Who Fell to Earth, and his guest appearance on the musical variety television show Soul Train. The two parted ways in December 1975, coming as a surprise to Lippman. In early-1976, Bowie filed a lawsuit against Lippman claiming he took a higher percentage of Bowie's earnings than what he was entitled. The two later reconciled their differences, and remained friends. Following his work with Bowie, Lippman joined Arista Records as Vice President of West Coast Operations, working under Clive Davis. While with Arista, he helped singer Melissa Manchester to her double nominations for Best Original Song at the 52nd Academy Awards.

Lippman went on to form Lippman Kahane Entertainment in 1986 with fellow talent manager Rob Kahane with the purpose of managing newly-solo talent George Michael. The partnership soon grew to include the management of other popular artists such as the bands Megadeth and Jane's Addiction. The pair split up in 1990, with Kahane retaining his position as Michael's manager and Lippman taking on the agency's other artists.

In 1996, Lippman became the manager for the band Matchbox Twenty. In addition to his work with the band, Lippman spent twenty years as manager for front man Rob Thomas's solo career, helping the star through label negotiations and career moments, including a 2016 holographic karaoke tour. Lippman continued his work with musicians as a part of Lippman Entertainment until his death, working alongside his brother Terry and son Nick.

== Personal life ==
Lippman married Nancy Harris in August 1968. The two were married for 57 years, and had two sons. His younger brother, Terry (1954–2021), also managed artists.

His son Nick served as a partner with Lippman Entertainment, while his other son Josh was the director of video content at iTunes.

Michael Lippman died at his home in Santa Ynez, California, on December 29, 2025, at the age of 79.
