= Easy Love (Dionne Warwick song) =

Single by Dionne Warwick

from the album No Night So Long
- B-side: "We Never Said Goodbye"
- Released: November 1980
- Recorded: 1980
- Genre: Pop, Adult Contemporary
- Length: 3:15
- Label: Arista
- Songwriters: Steve Dorff, Larry Herbstritt, Randy Cate
- Producer: Steve Buckingham

Dionne Warwick singles chronology
| "No Night So Long" (1980) | "Easy Love" (1980) | "Some Changes Are for Good" (1981) |

Professional ratings
Review scores
| Source | Rating |
|---|---|
| Billboard | (unrated) |

"Easy Love" is a song by Dionne Warwick from her 1980 album No Night So Long. It was the second of two charting singles from the LP.

"Easy Love" was released as a single in the fall of 1980, peaking at number 62 on the U.S. Billboard Hot 100. It was a bigger Adult Contemporary hit, reaching number 12 on the U.S. AC chart.

The B-side, "We Never Said Goodbye," was also a hit on the R&B chart, peaking at number 41.

== Track listing and formats ==
- US 7" Vinyl single

A. "Easy Love" – 3:15
B. "We Never Said Goodbye" – 3:33

== Charts ==
| Chart (1980–81) | Peak position |
|---|---|
| US Billboard Hot 100 | 62 |
| US Adult Contemporary (Billboard) | 12 |
| US Cashbox Top 100 | 77 |
