= Trudy Kerr =

Musical artist (born 1963)

- Born: 3 January 1963 (age 62)
- Origin: Brisbane, Queensland, Australia
- Genres: Jazz, adult contemporary
- Occupation(s): Musician, teacher, radio presenter, label owner
- Instrument: Vocals
- Years active: 1982–present
- Labels: Jazzizit
- Website: trudykerr.com

Trudy Kerr (born 3 January 1963) is an Australian-born jazz musician, teacher, radio presenter and label owner. Since 1997 she has released ten studio albums and a compilation album, Contemplation (January 2015). Kerr has performed concerts in the UK, continental Europe, East Asia and Australia. She resides in Malta with her husband, Geoff Gascoyne, a fellow jazz musician who plays double bass.

== Biography ==
Trudy Kerr's first gigs were in Brisbane clubs in 1980, at the age of 17, after she completed secondary schooling. Initially performing cover versions of adult contemporary music she adopted a jazz style after hearing Chaka Khan on the album, Echoes of an Era (January 1982). Kerr performed along the east coast of Australia and toured East Asia. In 1990 she moved to the United Kingdom to continue her music career. She completed a postgraduate jazz course at the Guildhall School of Music during 1994 to 1995. In 1995 Kerr met Geoff Gascoyne, a fellow jazz musician who plays various bass guitars (double bass, acoustic bass, electric bass) and is a sometime backing vocalist. The couple married in January 2002, and reside in Beckenham. In 1995 she started regularly appearing at Ronnie Scott's Jazz Club in London, including supporting Monty Alexander, which led to recording sessions in April 1997.

In October 1997 Kerr issued her debut album, Sweet Dreams, on FMR Records. It was produced by Trevor Taylor with session musicians including Mark Fletcher on drums and percussion, Andy Hamill on basses (acoustic, electric, double), Mark Johns on guitar, David O'Higgins on tenor saxophone and Phil Peskett on piano. AllMusic's Dave Nathan declared that Kerr "gives an honest and ardent rendition of all the tunes (both ballads and up-tempo numbers) she sings, showing great respect for the lyrics." Ian Carr, in The Rough Guide to Jazz, described her vocals "[she] is superbly versatile and can handle any kind of song with total conviction." By 1998 Kerr had performed at continental European concerts in Turkey and the Netherlands.

For her second album, Trudy (1998), Kerr was the first vocalist signed to Jazzizit Records: their "lack of experience in producing a vocal album is, regrettably, evident" according to Nathan. Other musicians used on Trudy include Acker Bilk on clarinet (and co-lead vocals on one track), Mornington Lockett on soprano saxophone and Nick Weldon on piano. Nathan finds the "result is a case of musical schizophrenia with performances divided into two categories. The first is where Kerr tries to be more than she is and thus her vocalizing seems unnatural and contrived... The second category proves the saving grace of this album... where Kerr is provided minimal accompaniment, both in terms of numbers of players and their style." Carr opined that the album was "even more confident and adventurous... [with] thirteen tracks in all and not one dull moment." Her record label, Jazzizit Records, had been set up in 1995 by Brian Nott and, in 2006, it was sold to Kerr and her label mate, Derek Nash.

Kerr released her third album, Day Dream, in 2000, using Gascoyne on double bass, Guy Barker on trumpet, Sebastian de Krom on drums and Mulgrew Miller on piano. Nathan, writing for All About Jazz, described her singing as showing "greater assurance, more sophisticated phrasing and interpretative qualities gained through experience." Her fourth studio effort was a tribute album, My Old Flame: Remembering Chet Baker (2001). Kerr performed cover versions of Baker's songs and added lyrics to some of his instrumental tracks.

In 2005 Kerr released Cloudburst to critical acclaim. Kerr took an instrumental approach adding lyrics to songs which were originally written instrumentally.

In 2007 Kerr asked Swedish piano star Jan Lundgren to work with her on her album Déjà vu. This album also featured US singer/songwriter Bob Dorough, Kerr and Dorough duetted on his Bebop classic “Up jumped a Bird”. Kerr toured the South of Sweden with Jan Lundgren to promote the CD as well as in the UK. The Jazz Man reviewed the release as "A typically classy offering from Kerr. A lovingly crafted selection of songs beautifully sung and flawlessly played"

In late 2007 Kerr toured the UK with her husband Geoff Gascoyne’s project “Keep it to yourself”. Bob Dorough performed with the band at the Cork Jazz festival and the piano player on that tour was Jamie Cullum.

After teaching on The Jazz Academy Summer Course run by Michael Garrick. Kerr went into the studio and recorded Like Minds with Michael in 2009. The music was a moving tribute to the music of Duke Ellington and to Garrick’s music also. The duo toured the UK and most notably there was a wonderful performance at the Southport Jazz Festival.

In 2010 Kerr and Ingrid James issued a duo album, Reunion, and John Fordham of The Guardian felt "James has the smoother, more stately delivery, with Kerr pushing the time-and-phrasing envelope more – but the contrast between them enhances what's fundamentally a down-the-line mainstream-to-bop set."

In 2012 a collaboration with Kerr's husband Geoff Gascoyne (Ted & Gladys) produced the album The Rhythm of Life. This album featured original compositions by Kerr and Gascoyne as well as some lesser known standards.

In 2015 Kerr released Contemplation, which is a compilation of some of Trudy’s Best work. London Jazz news stated "Delivering Contemplation with a sweet, poignant delicacy and wonderfully flexible sound, the singer demonstrates that she has always been a remarkable talent, and is still at the top of her game."

Kerr has collaborated with fellow jazz musicians including Jamie Cullum, Georgie Fame, Jan Lundgren, Bob Dorough, Michael Garrick, Tom Cawley and Jim Mullen.

== Early life ==
Kerr lived with her older sister Jane and younger brother Andrew in the western suburbs of Brisbane, where they were raised by their mother, Joy Seib. Kerr began singing lessons at age 10 with teacher Joy Mills and later with Colin Keats in St. Lucia.

Kerr was encouraged by her mother to perform and she entered many singing competitions. Trudy was a Grand Finalist in the Australian Talent TV Show “The Have a Go Show”. Trudy also played Nancy in the stage show Oliver in her Toowong High School Performance.

After leaving school Kerr began a two-year residency at “Neptunes in the Valley” a large Brisbane restaurant where she performed all genres of music but was introduced to jazz repertoire. Kerr continued to perform in bands around the Brisbane area most notably Mango Bop and the Pedestrians.

Trudy also held a residency in Port Vila, Vanuatu for a year in 1989.

== Voice coaching and teaching ==
As of 2004 Kerr taught a BA course in singing at Colchester Institute, Essex. She has held teaching positions at Trinity Laban, Guildhall School of Music and Drama, Chichester University and London Centre of Contemporary Music. She is a voice coach for young vocalists in various genres.

== Radio presenting ==
Trudy co-presents BBC Across the South’s Jazz Hour, on a Tuesday night with Roger Day where she plays the latest UK releases as well as classic jazz recordings.

== Discography ==
Year	Album details
1997	Sweet Surprise (FMR Records)
1998	Trudy (Jazzizit Records)
2000	Day Dream (Jazzizit Records)
2001	My Old Flame (Jazzizit Records)
2005	Cloudburst (Jazzizit Records)
2006	Jazz for Juniors (Jazzizit Records)
2007	Deja Vu (Jazzizit Records)
2009	Like Minds (Jazzizit Records)
2010	Reunion (by Trudy Kerr and Ingrid James) (Jazzizit Records)
2012	The Rhythm of Life (Jazzizit Records)
2015	Contemplation (compilation album) (Jazzizit Records)
