= Alicia Bridges =

American singer and songwriter

- Born: July 15, 1953 (age 73); Charlotte, North Carolina, U.S.
- Genres: R&B; disco; soul
- Occupations: Singer; songwriter
- Years active: 1977–present
- Website: www.aliciabridges.com

Alicia Bridges (born July 15, 1953) is an American singer and songwriter who co-wrote and performed her international hit "I Love the Nightlife (Disco 'Round)" in 1978.

== Early years ==
Born in Charlotte, North Carolina and raised in the small Cleveland County town of Lawndale, Bridges sang from a very young age, learning to play guitar at the age of 10. At the age of 12, she had her own radio program: The Alicia Bridges Show, broadcast every Saturday on station WADA in Shelby, North Carolina. From age thirteen, Bridges fronted bands that performed in local clubs: "They were pretty rough places ... but these were the only places I could get ... performing experience ... so I had to adjust to that rough environment and learn to survive in it."

== Discovery and fame (1970s) ==
Bridges first recorded for the Nashville-based Mega Records, with two 1973 single releases of her original material. Despite the lack of success of these releases, Bridges came to the attention of Bill Lowery, who became her manager, subsidizing Bridges over a roughly two-year period. During this time, he canvassed record labels on her behalf, which led to her signing with Polydor in 1977.

Bridges's self-titled debut album was the inaugural production by Steve Buckingham, who was assigned to produce Bridges after playing guitar on one of her earliest sessions. Bridges and her personal and songwriting partner Susan Hutcheson had written a song entitled "Disco 'Round", which, at Buckingham's suggestion, was recorded as "I Love the Nightlife", as Buckingham felt that the song was R&B rather than disco ("Disco 'Round" was retained as the song's subtitle): Bridges herself would later admit she had had hopes that the song would be received as a Memphis soul number, calling it "something Al Green might sing". However, club support was a key factor in the success of the track, which became a "sleeper" Top 40 hit, spending 27 weeks on the Billboard Hot 100 with a peak of number five, and also appearing on several international hit parades as evinced by the Billboard's "Hits of the World" chart. The song was also in the #7 position on the Record World charts and at #6 on the Cash Box charts. It was also a "crossover" hit, receiving play even on country music stations. The cover of the 1978 self-titled LP features an early skyline picture of Atlanta, Georgia.

In 1978, Bridges was a Grammy nominee and was the opening act, performing "I Love the Nightlife". Bridges' self-titled LP, Alicia Bridges, was also rising on the Billboard, Cash Box and Record World charts, and the LP remained on the charts for up to 35 weeks. Both the LP and the single release were international successes, and "I Love the Nightlife" went top-40 in the UK and Germany, Spain and other European countries. Bridges's music was especially popular in Japan. She received an RIAA Certified Gold Record for the sale of over one million copies of her hit single in the United States, as well as a gold record from Canada.

Contrary to the impression created by her success with "I Love the Nightlife", Bridges was primarily a singer of R&B, rock, blues and love songs. "I Love the Nightlife" has a definite back beat and organ similar to early 1970s R&B; the original intention was for "I Love the Nightlife" to be an R&B song, but when Bill Lowery first heard the song, he saw its disco potential: subsequently, a 12" single remix was created by Jim Burgess, ultimately becoming a worldwide club smash.

"I Love the Nightlife" has been featured in several movies, including Love at First Bite, The Last Days of Disco and The Adventures of Priscilla, Queen of the Desert.

Bridges's second single, "Body Heat", was a rock song with strong electric guitar rhythms. It was a "rock/dance" song released at a time when there was some rivalry between disco fans and rock fans; this time period began to see more songs that mixed the genres of rock and disco to create a "rock/disco" flavor.

In an interview, Bridges mentioned Elvis Presley as the singer who originally aroused her interest in rock music, but she has always considered herself an R&B singer. She cited Tina Turner, Aretha Franklin, Gladys Knight and Patti LaBelle as her 1970s influences. She said that she did not care for white female singers as a rule, with the exceptions being Joni Mitchell and Janis Joplin. She complained that white women sounded as though they were "sleepwalking" through their performances. "Yeah, I jump around a lot when I'm performing," she said.

=== Impostor ===
In 1983, a woman was arrested in Nashville, Tennessee for pretending to be Alicia Bridges during a country music convention. Bridges drove from her home in Atlanta to give evidence in the case. Bridges stated that she had been plagued by an impostor for five years.

== Recent years ==
After the 1984 release of the second of two consecutive unsuccessful album releases, Bridges began working as a disc jockey at Atlanta dance clubs. She was working at the Ponce de Leon Avenue venue the Atlanta Eagle when her disco classic "I Love the Nightlife" had its 1994 revival due to its inclusion on the soundtrack of the movie The Adventures of Priscilla, Queen of the Desert. This revival spurred Bridges to perform at retro disco shows for a number of years, before retiring to Charlotte, North Carolina.

Alicia Bridges Music Publications was founded in 2006 and has produced three albums.

In November 2006, Bridges released a remixed and remastered compilation of her songs titled This Girl Don't Care. In 2007, she released Say It Sister. Her third CD, Faux Diva, was released in 2008; this included a remix of "I Love The Nightlife".

Bridges is currently active in the music community as a producer and DJ. Her works, digital versions of her recordings, a blog and videos can be found on her official web sites.

In 2009, Bridges was inducted into the North Carolina Music Hall of Fame.

== Personal life ==
Bridges came out as a lesbian in 1998. In an interview with The Advocate, Bridges stated that, as a teenager, she realized she was "different from the rest".

== Discography ==
=== Albums ===
- 1978: Alicia Bridges (Polydor, 1978)
- 1979: Play It as It Lays
- 1984: Hocus Pocus
- 2002: The Collection: I Love the Nightlife (compilation)
- 2006: This Girl Don't Care (remixed and remastered compilation)
- 2007: Say It Sister (remastered compilation)
- 2008: Faux Diva (remixed and remastered compilation)

=== Singles ===
Year	Single	US	UK	AUS
1973	"Just a Little Lovin' (Just a Little Fun)"	—	—	—
1973	"Love Me Till the Morning"	—	—	—
1978	“I Love the Nightlife (Disco Round)”	5	32	9
1979	"Body Heat"	86	—	—
1979	“Rex the Robot”	—	—	—
1979	“Play It as It Lays”	—	—	—
1981	“If You Only Knew”	—	—	—
1984	“Under the Cover of Darkness”	—	—	—
1987	“Hungry Eyes”	—	—	—
1994	“I Love the Nightlife (Disco Round)”	—	61	11

=== EP ===
- 1978: The AOR Mini-Album

== See also ==
- List of 1970s one-hit wonders in the United States
