= I Love the Nightlife =

1978 single by Alicia Bridges

- Side A of the US single

Single by Alicia Bridges

from the album Alicia Bridges
- B-side: "Self Applause"
- Released: June 19, 1978
- Studio: Studio One (Doraville, Georgia)
- Genre: Disco
- Length: 5:37 (album version); 3:10 (7-inch edit)
- Label: Polydor
- Songwriters: Alicia Bridges; Susan Hutcheson
- Producer: Steve Buckingham

Alicia Bridges singles chronology
"I Love the Nightlife" (1978)	"Body Heat" (1979)

Audio
- "I Love the Nightlife (Disco 'Round)" (album ver.) on YouTube
- "I Love the Nightlife (Disco 'Round)" (edit) on YouTube

"I Love the Nightlife (Disco 'Round)" is a popular disco song recorded by American singer-songwriter Alicia Bridges in 1978. It was released as the first single from her debut album, Alicia Bridges (1978), and reached number two on the US Billboard National Disco Action Top 40 chart for two weeks. It became a crossover hit, peaking at number five on the Billboard Hot 100, and found worldwide success, reaching the top 10 in Australia, Belgium, Canada, the Netherlands and South Africa. A re-release in 1994 allowed the song to reach number four in New Zealand and number five in Iceland.

== Background ==
The song was co-written by Alicia Bridges and Susan Hutcheson in 1977 for Bill Lowery, founder of Southern Music. "I Love the Nightlife" was the first single produced by Steve Buckingham who was invited to produce the single's parent album entitled Alicia Bridges after he had played guitar on a session by the singer. Bridges suggested to Hutcheson that they write a song with either "disco" or "boogie" in the title after Bridges saw a current top-ten hit list featuring several songs with dance-oriented titles. The original title of the resultant song: "Disco 'Round", became the subtitle under the main title "I Love the Nightlife" as Buckingham considered it an R&B number and did not want it labeled disco. Bridges herself would later admit that she had hopes that the song would be received as a Memphis soul number, calling it "something Al Green might sing". However it is as a disco classic that the song is most remembered: in an August 26, 1998 MTV countdown of the Top 54 Dance Songs of the Disco Era, "I Love the Nightlife" was ranked at number 37.

== 1994 re-release ==
In 1994, the song gained renewed interest after being featured in the film The Adventures of Priscilla, Queen of the Desert. It was subsequently re-released and found the best success in New Zealand, where it reached number four in February 1995, 12 places higher than its original peak of number 16. The re-release also reached number five in Iceland and number 11 in Australia. Because of its association with the film (and also because Bridges herself is an open lesbian), the song is closely linked with gay culture. It was remixed for this release. Music critic Alan Jones of Music Week complimented it as "fab".

== Music video ==
A music video was directed by Bruce Gowers.

=== 1994 video ===
In 1994, a new video was produced featuring Hugo Weaving, star of the film The Adventures of Priscilla, Queen of the Desert. The new video splices together footage from the original video (1978) with new footage. You can watch the 1994 video: Here. It depicts Hugo Weaving returning home from a long work trip to a family uninterested in seeing him. He then enters a bedroom and sits at a vanity and slowly transforms from his work uniform to full make up and fancy dress. He then exits the house with a group of people also all dressed up and his family is shocked.

== Charts ==
=== Weekly charts ===
Chart (1978–1979)	Peak position
Australia (Kent Music Report)	9
Belgium (Ultratop 50 Flanders)	7
Canada Top Singles (RPM)	3
Canada Adult Contemporary (RPM)	1
Canada Dance/Urban (RPM)	3
Netherlands (Dutch Top 40)	9
Netherlands (Single Top 100)	11
New Zealand (Recorded Music NZ)	16
South Africa (Springbok Radio)	7
UK Singles (Official Charts)	32
US Billboard Hot 100	5
US Adult Contemporary (Billboard)	44
US Dance Club Songs (Billboard)	2
US Hot R&B/Hip-Hop Songs (Billboard)	31
US Cash Box Top 100	6
West Germany (GfK)	35

Chart (1988)	Peak position
New Zealand (Recorded Music NZ)	29

Chart (1994–1995)	Peak position
Australia (ARIA)	11
Iceland (Íslenski Listinn Topp 40)	5
New Zealand (Recorded Music NZ)	4
UK Singles (Official Charts)	61
UK Club Chart (Music Week)	59
US Maxi-Singles Sales (Billboard)	10

=== Year-end charts ===
Chart (1978)	Position
Canada Top Singles (RPM)	75
US Billboard Hot 100	88
US Cash Box Top 100	70

Chart (1979)	Position
Australia (Kent Music Report)	48
Belgium (Ultratop)	77
Canada Top Singles (RPM)	107
Netherlands (Single Top 100)	85
US Billboard Hot 100	64

Chart (1994)	Position
Australia (ARIA)	52

Chart (1995)	Position
New Zealand (RIANZ)	45

== Certifications ==
Region	Certification	Certified units/sales
Australia (ARIA)	Gold	35,000^{^}
Canada (Music Canada)	Gold	75,000^{^}
United States (RIAA)	Gold	1,000,000^{^}
^{^} Shipments figures based on certification alone.

== Cover versions ==
- Laura Branigan sang the song live on German television and it was included on the very rare compilation album Gut Gestimmt in 1980.
- In 1995 the song was released by the band Bronski Beat labeled "I Luv the Nightlife", which featured two remix versions of the original song and two remix versions of the alternate song "Hit That Perfect Beat Boy".
- It was re-recorded by Latin singer La India and Nuyorican Soul as a track on the soundtrack for the film The Last Days of Disco. This version peaked at number 12 on the Billboard Hot Dance Club Songs chart.
- In 2003 it was performed by Taylor Dayne in the television special The Disco Ball.

== See also ==
- List of 1970s one-hit wonders in the United States
