= Isaac Hayes discography =

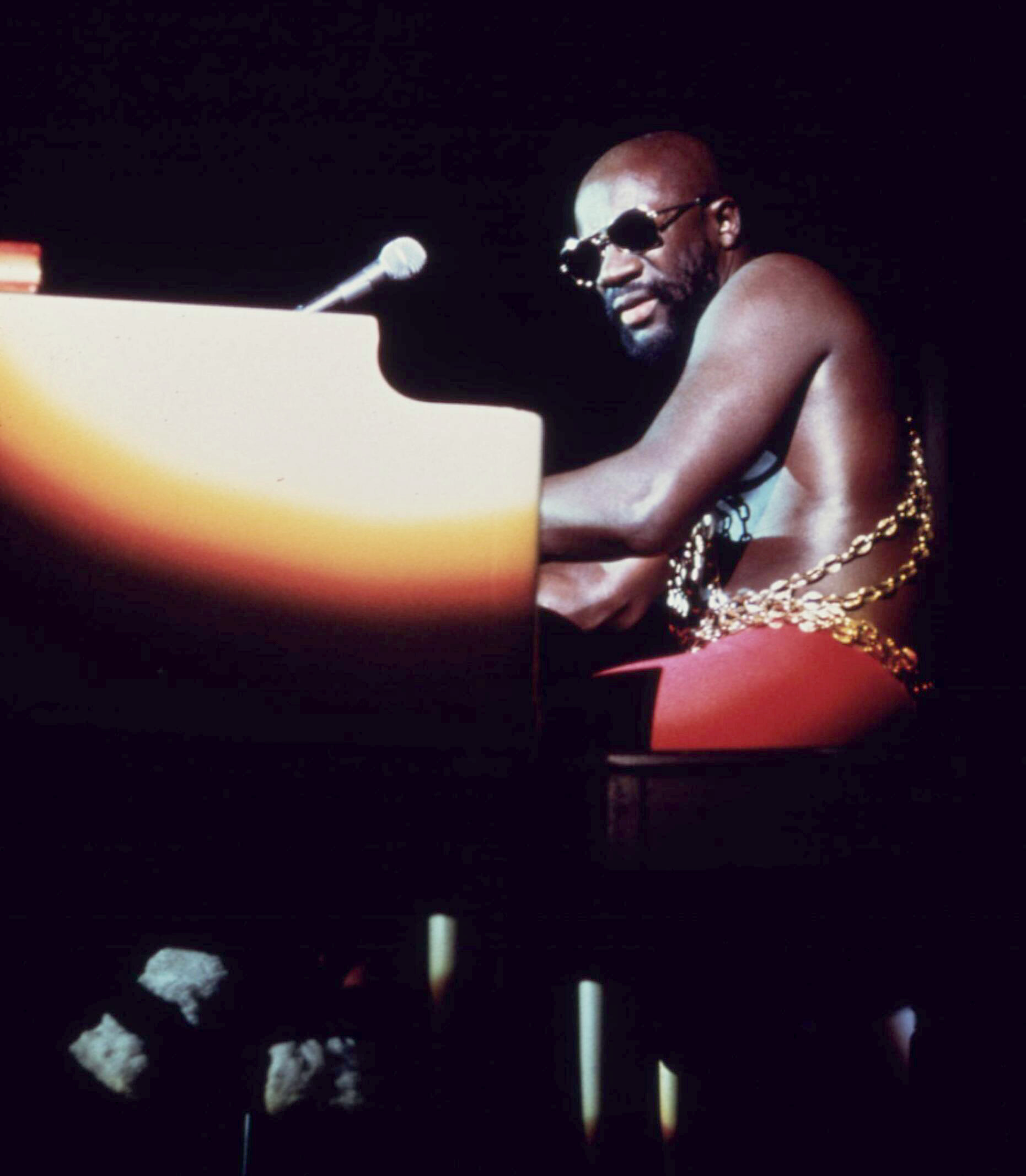
- Studio albums: 20
- Soundtrack albums: 3
- Live albums: 3
- Compilation albums: 11
- Singles: 44

This article contains a comprehensive collection of information related to recordings by American soul and funk musician, Isaac Hayes.

== Albums ==
=== Studio albums ===
==== 1960s–1970s ====
Title	Album details	Peak chart positions						Certifications
Title	Album details	US	US R&B	AUS	CAN	SWE	UK	Certifications
Presenting Isaac Hayes	Released: 1968; Reissued: 1972 as In the Beginning; Label: Enterprise, Atlantic	102	25	—	—	—	—	
Hot Buttered Soul	Released: 1969; Label: Enterprise	8	1	—	9	—	—	RIAA: Gold
The Isaac Hayes Movement	Released: 1970; Label: Enterprise	8	1	—	20	—	—	RIAA: Gold
...To Be Continued	Released: 1970; Label: Enterprise	11	1	—	42	—	—	
Black Moses	Released: 1971; Label: Enterprise	10	1	—	12	—	38	
Joy	Released: 1973; Label: Enterprise	16	2	—	42	—	—	RIAA: Gold
Chocolate Chip	Released: 1975; Label: Hot Buttered Soul, ABC	18	1	79	—	—	—	RIAA: Gold
Disco Connection	Released: 1975; Label: Hot Buttered Soul, ABC	85	19	—	—	—	—	
Groove-A-Thon	Released: 1976; Label: Hot Buttered Soul, ABC	45	11	—	—	42	—	
Juicy Fruit (Disco Freak)	Released: 1976; Label: Hot Buttered Soul, ABC	124	18	—	—	—	—	
New Horizon	Released: 1977; Label: Polydor	78	26	—	87	—	—	
For the Sake of Love	Released: 1978; Label: Polydor	75	15	—	72	—	—	
Hotbed	Released: 1978; Label: Fantasy	—	—	—	—	—	—	
Don't Let Go	Released: 1979; Label: Polydor	39	9	41	—	—	—	RIAA: Gold
Royal Rappin's (with Millie Jackson)	Released: 1979; Label: Polydor	80	17	—	—	—	—	

==== 1980s–1990s ====
Title	Album details	Peak chart positions	
Title	Album details	US	US R&B
And Once Again	Released: 1980; Label: Polydor	59	26
Lifetime Thing	Released: 1981; Label: Polydor	—	—
U-Turn	Released: 1986; Label: Columbia/CBS	—	32
Love Attack	Released: 1988; Label: Columbia/CBS	—	70
Raw & Refined	Released: 1995; Label: Pointblank/Virgin/EMI	—	—
Branded	Released: 1995; Label: Pointblank/Virgin/EMI	—	75

=== Live albums ===
Title	Album details	Peak chart positions				Certifications
Title	Album details	US	US R&B	AUS	CAN	Certifications
Live at the Sahara Tahoe	Released: 1973; Label: Enterprise	14	1	—	34	RIAA: Gold
A Man and a Woman (with Dionne Warwick)	Released: 1977; Label: ABC	49	20	66	77	
Isaac Hayes at Wattstax	Released: 2003; Label: Stax	—	—	—	—	

=== Compilation albums ===
Title	Album details	Peak chart positions		
Title	Album details	US	US R&B	SWE
The Best of Isaac Hayes	Released: 1975; Label: Enterprise	165	57	—
Wonderful	Released: 1994; Label: Fantasy	—	—	—
The Best of the Polydor Years	Released: 1996; Label: Polydor	—	—	—
Best of Isaac Hayes XL	Released: 2000; Label: Stax	—	—	46
Out of the Ghetto - The Polydor Years	Released: 2000; Label: Spectrum	—	—	—
Instrumentals	Released: 2003; Label: Stax	—	—	—
Ultimate Isaac Hayes: Can You Dig It?	Released: 2005; Label: Stax	171	53	—
The Very Best of Isaac Hayes	Released: 2007; Label: Concord	—	57	—
Forever Isaac Hayes	Released: 2007; Label: Madacy	—	87	—
Sings for Lovers	Released: 2009; Label: Concord	—	—	—
Hot Buttered Singles 1969–1972	Released: 2024; Label: Stax	—	—	—
Hot Buttered Singles Volume 2 1972–1976	Released: 2025; Label: Stax	—	—	—
The Best of Isaac Hayes	Released: 2025; Label: Stax	—	—	—

=== Box sets ===
Title	Album details
The Spirit of Memphis 1962–1976	Released: 2017; Label: Craft

=== Soundtrack albums ===
Title	Album details	Peak chart positions				Certifications
Title	Album details	US	US R&B	CAN	UK	Certifications
Shaft	Released: 1971; Label: Enterprise	1	1	5	17	RIAA: Gold
Tough Guys	Released: 1974; Label: Enterprise	146	—	—	—	
Truck Turner	Released: 1974; Label: Enterprise	156	17	—	—	

== Singles ==
=== 1960s–1970s ===
Title	Year	Peak chart positions							Certifications	Album
Title	Year	US	US R&B	BEL (FL)	BEL (WA)	GER	NL	UK	Certifications	Album
A-side: "Sweet Temptation'" B-side: "Laura (We're On Our Last Go-Round)"	1964	—	—	—	—	—	—	—		Non-album single
A-side: "Blue Groove" B-side: "Big Dipper" (both by 'Sir Issac and the Do-Dads')	1965	—	—	—	—	—	—	—		Non-album single
"Precious, Precious" "Going to Chicago Blues"	1968	—	—	—	—	—	—	—		Presenting Isaac Hayes
"Walk On By" "By the Time I Get to Phoenix"	1969	30	13	—	—	—	—	—		Hot Buttered Soul
"Walk On By" "By the Time I Get to Phoenix"	1969	37	37	—	—	—	—	—		Hot Buttered Soul
"The Mistletoe and Me" "Winter Snow"	1969	—	—	—	—	—	—	—		Non-album single
"I Stand Accused" "I Just Don't Know What to Do with Myself"	1970	42	23	—	—	—	—	—		The Isaac Hayes Movement
"The Look of Love"	1971	79	—	—	—	—	—	—		...To Be Continued
"Never Can Say Goodbye" "I Can't Help It (If I'm Still in Love with You)" (non-album track)	1971	22	5	—	—	—	—	—		Black Moses
"Theme from Shaft" "Cafe Regio's" (instrumental)	1971	1	2	3	3	35	12	4	RIAA: Gold	Shaft
"Do Your Thing" "Ellie's Love Theme" (instrumental)	1972	30	3	—	—	—	—	—		Shaft
"Let's Stay Together" (instrumental) "Soulsville" (from Shaft)	1972	48	25	—	—	—	—	—		Non-album singles
"Ain't That Loving You (For More Reasons Than One)" "Baby, I'm-a Want You" (both songs with David Porter)	1972	86	37	—	—	—	—	—		Non-album singles
"Theme from The Men" (instrumental) "Type Thang"	1972	38	19	—	—	—	—	—		Non-album singles
"Rolling Down a Mountainside" "(If Loving You Is Wrong) I Don't Want to Be Right"	1973	104	—	—	—	—	—	—		Non-album singles
"Joy, Part I" "Joy, Part II"	1973	30	7	—	—	—	—	—		Joy
"Wonderful" "Someone Made You for Me"	1974	71	18	—	—	—	—	—		Wonderful
"Title Theme" (from Tough Guys) "Hung Up on My Baby"	1974	—	72	—	—	—	—	—		Tough Guys
"Chocolate Chip"	1975	92	13	—	—	—	—	—		Chocolate Chip
"Come Live with Me" "Body Language"	1975	—	20	—	—	—	—	—		Chocolate Chip
"Disco Connection" "St. Thomas Square"	1975	—	60	—	—	—	—	10		Disco Connection
"Rock Me Easy Baby" (Part I) "Rock Me Easy Baby" (Part II)	1976	—	58	—	—	—	—	—		Groove-A-Thon
"Juicy Fruit (Disco Freak)" (Part I) "Juicy Fruit (Disco Freak)" (Part II)	1976	102	—	—	—	—	—	—		Juicy Fruit (Disco Freak)
"By the Time I Get to Phoenix" / "I Say a Little Prayer" "That's the Way I Like It" / "Get Down Tonight" (all songs with Dionne Warwick)	1977	—	65	—	—	—	—	—		A Man and a Woman
"Out of the Ghetto" "It's Heaven to Me"	1977	107	42	—	—	—	—	—		New Horizon
"Moonlight Lovin' (Ménage à Trois)" / "Stranger in Paradise"	1978	—	96	—	—	—	—	—		New Horizon
"Zeke the Freak" "If We Ever Needed Peace"	1978	—	19	—	—	—	—	—		For the Sake of Love
"Just the Way You Are" (Part I) "Just the Way You Are" (Part II)	1979	—	—	—	—	—	—	—		For the Sake of Love
"Don't Let Go" "You Can't Hold Your Woman"	1979	18	11	—	—	—	—	—		Don't Let Go
"Do You Wanna Make Love" "I Changed My Mind" (both songs with Millie Jackson)	1979	—	30	—	—	—	—	—		Royal Rappin's

=== 1980s–2000s ===
Title	Year	Peak chart positions								Certifications	Album
Title	Year	US R&B	AUS	BEL (FL)	FRA	NL	NOR	SWE	UK	Certifications	Album
"You Never Cross My Mind" "Feels Like the First Time" (both songs with Millie Jackson)	1980	78	—	—	—	—	—	—	—		Royal Rappin's
"A Few More Kisses to Go" "What Does It Take"	1980	89	—	—	—	—	—	—	—		Don't Let Go
"I Ain't Never" "Love Has Been Good to Us"	1980	49	—	—	—	—	—	—	—		And Once Again
"It's All in the Game" "Wherever You Are"	1980	86	—	—	—	—	—	—	—		And Once Again
"I'm Gonna Make You Love Me" "I'm So Proud"	1981	—	—	—	—	—	—	—	—		Lifetime Thing
"Fugitive" "Lifetime Thing"	1981	—	—	—	—	—	—	—	—		Lifetime Thing
"Ike's Rap VIII" / "Hey Girl"	1986	9	—	—	—	—	—	—	—		U-Turn
"Thing for You" "Thank God for Love"	1987	43	—	—	—	—	—	—	—		U-Turn
"Showdown"	1988	40	—	—	—	—	—	—	—		Love Attack
"Let Me Be Your Everything" "Curious"	1988	—	—	—	—	—	—	—	—		Love Attack
"Just Be My Lady" (with Kim Waters)	1990	71	—	—	—	—	—	—	—		All Because of You
"Dark and Lovely (You Over There)" (with Barry White)	1992	29	—	—	—	—	—	—	—		Put Me in Your Mix
"Fragile"	1995	—	—	—	—	—	—	—	77		Branded
"Chocolate Salty Balls" (as the animated character Chef)	1998	—	14	15	82	8	5	17	1		Chef Aid: The South Park Album
"Shaft 2000"	2000	—	—	—	—	—	—	—	53		Non-album single

== As sideman ==
With William Bell

- The Soul of a Bell (Stax, 1967)

With Donald Byrd and 125th Street, N.Y.C.

- Love Byrd (Elektra, 1981)
- Words, Sounds, Colors and Shapes (Elektra, 1982)

With Linda Clifford

- I'm Yours (RSO, 1980)

With Delaney & Bonnie

- Home (Stax Records, 1969)

With Eddie Floyd

- Knock on Wood (Stax, 1967)

With Albert King

- Born Under a Bad Sign (Stax, 1967)

With Wilson Pickett

- The Exciting Wilson Pickett (Atlantic, 1966)

With Otis Redding

- Otis Blue/Otis Redding Sings Soul (Stax, 1965)
- The Soul Album (Stax, 1966)
- Complete & Unbelievable: The Otis Redding Dictionary of Soul (Stax, 1966)
- King & Queen (Stax, 1967)
- The Dock of the Bay (Stax, 1968)

With Mavis Staples

- Mavis Staples (Volt Records, 1969)
- Only for the Lonely (Volt Records, 1970)

With Carla Thomas

- Memphis Queen (Stax Records, 1969)

With Rufus Thomas

- Do The Funky Chicken (Stax, 1970)

With Dionne Warwick

- No Night So Long (Arista, 1980)
