= List of Billboard number-one R&B albums of 1971 =

These are the Billboard R&B albums that reached number-one in 1971.

== Chart history ==
Issue date	Album	Artist(s)
January 2	...To Be Continued	Isaac Hayes
January 9	...To Be Continued	Isaac Hayes
January 16	...To Be Continued	Isaac Hayes
January 23	...To Be Continued	Isaac Hayes
January 30	...To Be Continued	Isaac Hayes
February 6	Curtis	Curtis Mayfield
February 13	Curtis	Curtis Mayfield
February 20	...To Be Continued	Isaac Hayes
February 27	...To Be Continued	Isaac Hayes
March 6	...To Be Continued	Isaac Hayes
March 13	Curtis	Curtis Mayfield
March 20	Curtis	Curtis Mayfield
March 27	...To Be Continued	Isaac Hayes
April 3	...To Be Continued	Isaac Hayes
April 10	Live in Cook County Jail	B.B. King
April 17	Live in Cook County Jail	B.B. King
April 24	Live in Cook County Jail	B.B. King
May 1	Curtis	Curtis Mayfield
May 8	Maybe Tomorrow	The Jackson 5
May 15	Maybe Tomorrow	The Jackson 5
May 22	Maybe Tomorrow	The Jackson 5
May 29	Maybe Tomorrow	The Jackson 5
June 5	Maybe Tomorrow	The Jackson 5
June 12	Maybe Tomorrow	The Jackson 5
June 19	Aretha Live at Fillmore West	Aretha Franklin
June 26	Aretha Live at Fillmore West	Aretha Franklin
July 3	Aretha Live at Fillmore West	Aretha Franklin
July 10	Aretha Live at Fillmore West	Aretha Franklin
July 17	Aretha Live at Fillmore West	Aretha Franklin
July 24	What's Going On	Marvin Gaye
July 31	What's Going On	Marvin Gaye
August 7	What's Going On	Marvin Gaye
August 14	What's Going On	Marvin Gaye
August 21	What's Going On	Marvin Gaye
August 28	What's Going On	Marvin Gaye
September 4	What's Going On	Marvin Gaye
September 11	What's Going On	Marvin Gaye
September 18	What's Going On	Marvin Gaye
September 25	Shaft	Soundtrack / Isaac Hayes
October 2	Shaft	Soundtrack / Isaac Hayes
October 9	Shaft	Soundtrack / Isaac Hayes
October 16	Shaft	Soundtrack / Isaac Hayes
October 23	Shaft	Soundtrack / Isaac Hayes
October 30	Shaft	Soundtrack / Isaac Hayes
November 6	Shaft	Soundtrack / Isaac Hayes
November 13	Shaft	Soundtrack / Isaac Hayes
November 20	Shaft	Soundtrack / Isaac Hayes
November 27	Shaft	Soundtrack / Isaac Hayes
December 4	Shaft	Soundtrack / Isaac Hayes
December 11	Shaft	Soundtrack / Isaac Hayes
December 18	Shaft	Soundtrack / Isaac Hayes
December 25	Shaft	Soundtrack / Isaac Hayes

== See also ==
- 1971 in music
- List of Best Selling Soul Singles number ones of 1971
- List of Billboard 200 number-one albums of 1971
