= A Man and a Woman (Isaac Hayes and Dionne Warwick album) =

Live album by Isaac Hayes and Dionne Warwick
- Released: 1977
- Venue: Fabulous Fox, Atlanta
- Genre: Soul
- Label: ABC
- Producer: Esmond Edwards

Isaac Hayes chronology
Juicy Fruit (Disco Freak) (1976)	A Man and a Woman (1977)	New Horizon (1977)

Dionne Warwick chronology
Track of the Cat (1975)	A Man and a Woman (1977)	Love at First Sight (1977)

Professional ratings
Review scores
Source	Rating
AllMusic	2.5/5 stars
The Encyclopedia of Popular Music	3/5 stars
The Rolling Stone Album Guide	3/5 stars

A Man and a Woman is a duet live album by American singers Isaac Hayes and Dionne Warwick, released in 1977 by ABC Records. The album was recorded during one of the concerts of the artists' 1976 joint tour. It was also able to get into the top twenty of Billboard's soul chart.

== Track listing ==
Side A

1. "Unity" (Kenneth Gamble, Leon Huff) – 7:08
2. Medley – 7:34
  - "I Just Don't Know What to Do with Myself" (Burt Bacharach, Hal David)
  - "Walk On By" (Burt Bacharach, Hal David)
3. "My Love" (Paul McCartney, Linda McCartney) – 4:42

Side B

1. Medley – 14:29
  - "The Way I Want to Touch You" (Toni Tennille)
  - "Have You Never Been Mellow" (John Farrar)
  - "Love Will Keep Us Together" (Howard Greenfield, Neil Sedaka)
  - "I Love Music" (Kenneth Gamble, Leon Huff)
  - "This Will Be (An Everlasting Love)" (Chuck Jackson, Marvin Yancy)
  - "That's the Way I Like It" (Harry Wayne Casey, Richard Finch)
  - "Get Down Tonight" (Harry Wayne Casey, Richard Finch)
2. Medley – 4:33
  - "By the Time I Get to Phoenix" (Jimmy Webb)
  - "I Say a Little Prayer" (Burt Bacharach, Hal David)

Side C

1. "Then Came You" (Phillip T. Pugh, Sherman Marshall) – 2:51
2. Medley – 8:42
  - "Feelings" (Morris Albert)
  - "My Eyes Adored You" (Bob Crewe, Kenny Nolan)
3. "Body Language" (Isaac Hayes) – 6:46

Side D

1. "Can't Hide Love" (Skip Scarborough) – 4:42
2. "Come Live with Me" (Isaac Hayes) – 5:16
3. "Once You Hit the Road" (Charles Simmons, Joseph Jefferson) – 2:58
4. "Chocolate Chip" (Isaac Hayes) – 8:56

== Charts ==
Chart performance for A Man and a Woman
Chart (1977)	Peak position
Australian Albums (Kent Music Report)	66
Canada Top 100 Albums (RPM)	71
US Top LPs & Tape (Billboard)	49
US Soul LPs (Billboard)	20
US Top 100 Albums (Cash Box)	88
US Top 75 R&B Albums (Cash Box)	31
US The Album Chart (Record World)	101
US The R&B LP Chart (Record World)	14
