= List of Billboard number-one R&B albums of 1970 =

These are the Billboard magazine R&B albums that reached number-one in 1970.

== Chart history ==
| Issue date | Album | Artist |
|---|---|---|
| January 3 | Puzzle People | The Temptations |
| January 10 | Puzzle People | The Temptations |
| January 17 | Puzzle People | The Temptations |
| January 24 | Puzzle People | The Temptations |
| January 31 | Puzzle People | The Temptations |
| February 7 | Puzzle People | The Temptations |
| February 14 | Diana Ross Presents The Jackson 5 | The Jackson 5 |
| February 21 | Diana Ross Presents The Jackson 5 | The Jackson 5 |
| February 28 | Diana Ross Presents The Jackson 5 | The Jackson 5 |
| March 7 | Diana Ross Presents The Jackson 5 | The Jackson 5 |
| March 14 | Diana Ross Presents The Jackson 5 | The Jackson 5 |
| March 21 | Diana Ross Presents The Jackson 5 | The Jackson 5 |
| March 28 | Diana Ross Presents The Jackson 5 | The Jackson 5 |
| April 4 | Diana Ross Presents The Jackson 5 | The Jackson 5 |
| April 11 | Diana Ross Presents The Jackson 5 | The Jackson 5 |
| April 18 | Psychedelic Shack | The Temptations |
| April 25 | Psychedelic Shack | The Temptations |
| May 2 | Psychedelic Shack | The Temptations |
| May 9 | Psychedelic Shack | The Temptations |
| May 16 | The Isaac Hayes Movement | Isaac Hayes |
| May 23 | The Isaac Hayes Movement | Isaac Hayes |
| May 30 | The Isaac Hayes Movement | Isaac Hayes |
| June 6 | The Isaac Hayes Movement | Isaac Hayes |
| June 13 | The Isaac Hayes Movement | Isaac Hayes |
| June 20 | ABC | The Jackson 5 |
| June 27 | ABC | The Jackson 5 |
| July 4 | ABC | The Jackson 5 |
| July 11 | ABC | The Jackson 5 |
| July 18 | ABC | The Jackson 5 |
| July 25 | ABC | The Jackson 5 |
| August 1 | ABC | The Jackson 5 |
| August 8 | The Isaac Hayes Movement | Isaac Hayes |
| August 15 | The Isaac Hayes Movement | Isaac Hayes |
| August 22 | ABC | The Jackson 5 |
| August 29 | ABC | The Jackson 5 |
| September 5 | ABC | The Jackson 5 |
| September 12 | ABC | The Jackson 5 |
| September 19 | ABC | The Jackson 5 |
| September 26 | Diana Ross | Diana Ross |
| October 3 | Diana Ross | Diana Ross |
| October 10 | Third Album | The Jackson 5 |
| October 17 | Third Album | The Jackson 5 |
| October 24 | Third Album | The Jackson 5 |
| October 31 | Third Album | The Jackson 5 |
| November 7 | Third Album | The Jackson 5 |
| November 14 | Third Album | The Jackson 5 |
| November 21 | Third Album | The Jackson 5 |
| November 28 | Third Album | The Jackson 5 |
| December 5 | Third Album | The Jackson 5 |
| December 12 | Third Album | The Jackson 5 |
| December 19 | Greatest Hits | Sly and the Family Stone |
| December 26 | ...To Be Continued | Isaac Hayes |

== See also ==
- 1970 in music
- R&B number-one hits of 1970 (USA)
