= Track of the Cat =

Track of the Cat may refer to:

- Track of the Cat (film), a 1954 American Western film
- Track of the Cat (album), a 1975 album by Dionne Warwick
- Track of the Cat (novel), a 1993 novel by Nevada Barr
- The Track of the Cat, a 1949 novel by Walter Van Tilburg Clark, adapted into the 1954 film
