= Presenting Isaac Hayes =

Studio album by Isaac Hayes
- Released: March 1968
- Recorded: January 15–17, 1968
- Studio: Stax (Memphis, Tennessee)
- Genre: Soul; jazz
- Length: 33:32
- Label: Enterprise; Atlantic
- Producer: Alvertis Isbell; Al Jackson Jr.; Donald "Duck" Dunn

Isaac Hayes chronology
Presenting Isaac Hayes (1968)	Hot Buttered Soul (1969)

Reissue cover
- Atlantic reissued Presenting Isaac Hayes as In the Beginning in 1972.

Professional ratings
Review scores
Source	Rating
AllMusic	4/5 stars

Presenting Isaac Hayes is the debut studio album by American soul musician Isaac Hayes. The album was released in 1968, by Enterprise and distributed by Atlantic Records. The LP was the first release on Stax Records' Enterprise label; Hayes had for several years served as one of Stax's key songwriters, producers, and studio musicians.

Recorded to appease Stax vice president Alvertis Isbell (Al Bell), Presenting features Hayes recording with Booker T. & the MGs members Al Jackson, Jr. and Donald "Duck" Dunn as a jazz trio. No material was prepared for the sessions, so the three musicians improvised an album's worth of material. It has thus been described as a jam session album. According to the author Christopher R. Weingarten, the record is "little more than an alcohol-fuelled jam session edited down to album format." The album was a commercial failure.

"Precious, Precious", recorded as a 19-minute jazz piece, was edited to under three minutes for release as a single. Both the 45 and the album under-performed, and Hayes would only continue his recording career after Stax lost its entire back catalog to Atlantic Records during the process of breaking away from Atlantic. The lack of material necessitated all Stax artists — Hayes included — to record albums for release, resulting in Hayes' successful and groundbreaking Hot Buttered Soul (1969).

Following Hayes' success with Hot Buttered Soul, in 1971 Black Moses and the Shaft soundtrack, Atlantic reissued Presenting Isaac Hayes under the title In the Beginning.

== Critical reception ==
In The Rolling Stone Album Guide (1992), Presenting Isaac Hayes is described as a "bluesy after-hours jam session".

== Track listing ==
Side one
No.	Title	Writer(s)	Length
1.	"Precious, Precious"	Isaac Hayes	2:45
2.	"When I Fall in Love" (Victor Young cover)	Edward Heyman, Victor Young	3:28
3.	"Medley: "I Just Want to Make Love to You" / "Rock Me Baby" (Muddy Waters cover / B.B. King cover)	Willie Dixon, Riley B. King, Joe Josea	9:04

Side two
No.	Title	Writer(s)	Length
4.	"Medley: "I'm Going to Chicago Blues" / "Misty" (Johnny Mathis cover)	Count Basie, Jimmy Rushing, Erroll Garner, Johnny Burke	6:45
5.	"You Don't Know Like I Know"	Isaac Hayes, David Porter	8:30

1995 CD reissue bonus track
No.	Title	Writer(s)	Length
6.	"Precious, Precious" (long version)	Isaac Hayes	19:07

== Personnel ==
- Isaac Hayes - vocals, piano
- Donald "Duck" Dunn - bass guitar
- Al Jackson Jr. - drums

Technical

- Arif Mardin, Steve Cropper - mixing
- Alvertis Isbell - supervision
- Bill Kington, API Photographers - photography
- Loring Eutemey - cover design
- Stanislaw Zagórski - reissue cover design
