= Love at First Sight (Dionne Warwick album) =

Studio album by Dionne Warwick
- Released: 1977
- Recorded: 1977
- Studio: Kendun (Burbank, California)
- Genre: Soul
- Length: 35:34
- Label: Warner Bros.
- Producers: Michael Omartian; Steve Barri

Dionne Warwick chronology
| A Man and a Woman (1977) | Love at First Sight (1977) | Dionne (1979) |

Singles from Love at First Sight
- 1. "Do You Believe in Love at First Sight" Released: 1977; 2. "Keepin' My Head Above Water" Released: 1977; 3. "Don't Ever Take Your Love Away" Released: 1978

Love at First Sight is a studio album by American singer Dionne Warwick, released in 1977 by Warner Bros. Records.

== Overview ==
The album was produced by Michael Omartian and Steve Barri. The sound of the longplay resembled the previous works of the artist in the Scepter Records period. The track “Early Morning Strangers," was co-written by Hal David, who co-wrote Warwick's '60s and early-'70s hit classics with Burt Bacharach. “Early Morning Strangers” had music by Barry Manilow who would produce her first Arista album in 1979.

The album failed to chart and was Warwick's last album with Warner Bros. The next album would be released on Arista Records.

== Critical reception ==
Professional ratings
Review scores
| Source | Rating |
|---|---|
| AllMusic | 3/5 stars |
| The Encyclopedia of Popular Music | 2/5 stars |
| The Rolling Stone Album Guide | 2.5/5 stars |

The Globe and Mail wrote that Warwick "is floundering right now, wasting her talents on humdrum material, still looking for the challenge Bacharach offered with his slinky, tricky melodies."

== Track listing ==
Side one
| No. | Title | Writer(s) | Length |
|---|---|---|---|
| 1. | "Keepin' My Head Above Water" | Dennis Lambert; Brian Potter | 3:20 |
| 2. | "Love in the Afternoon" | Richard Germinaro; Evie Sands; Ben Weisman | 3:12 |
| 3. | "A Long Way to Go" | Barry Mann; Cynthia Weil | 3:25 |
| 4. | "Do I Have to Cry" | James David; Lenny Stack | 3:01 |
| 5. | "Don't Ever Take Your Love Away" | Isaac Hayes; Lee W. Jones | 5:40 |

Side two
| No. | Title | Writer(s) | Length |
|---|---|---|---|
| 1. | "One Thing on My Mind" | Germinaro; Sands | 3:25 |
| 2. | "Early Morning Strangers" | Hal David; Barry Manilow | 3:48 |
| 3. | "Livin' It Up Is Starting to Get Me Down" | Peter Larson; Josh Rubins | 3:40 |
| 4. | "Since You Stayed Here" | Larson; Rubins | 2:41 |
| 5. | "Do You Believe in Love at First Sight" | Chris Rae; Ron Roker; Gerry Shury; Frank McDonald | 3:06 |

== Personnel ==
- Dionne Warwick – vocals, backing vocals
- Michael Omartian – all keyboards, arrangements and conductor
- Peter Larson – acoustic piano (9)
- Ben Benay – guitars
- Jay Graydon – guitars
- Ray Parker Jr. – guitars
- Scott Edwards – bass
- Ed Greene – drums
- Steve Barri – percussion
- Victor Feldman – percussion
- Fred Selden – horns (saxophones)
- Ernie Watts – horns (saxophones)
- Dick Hyde – horns (trombone)
- Lew McCreary – horns (trombone)
- Chuck Findley – horns (trumpet)
- Steve Madaio – horns (trumpet)
- Sid Sharp – string section, concertmaster
- Darlene Love – backing vocals
- Myrna Matthews – backing vocals
- Marti McCall – backing vocals
- Stormie Omartian – backing vocals
- Eunice Peterson – backing vocals
- Ann White – backing vocals

Production

- Steve Barri – producer
- Michael Omartian – producer
- Phil Kaye – sound engineer
- Rick Heenan – assistant engineer
- Joe Laux – assistant engineer
- Karen White – production coordinator
- John Cabalka – art direction
- Harry Langdon – photography
