= And Once Again =

And Once Again may refer to:

- ...And Once Again, a 2010 Indian family drama film
- And Once Again (album), a 1980 album by Isaac Hayes
