= Love Attack (album) =

Studio album by Isaac Hayes
- Released: September 20, 1988
- Recorded: 1988
- Genre: Soul, funk
- Length: 45:44
- Label: Columbia/CBS
- Producer: Isaac Hayes

Isaac Hayes chronology
U-Turn (1986)	Love Attack (1988)	Raw & Refined (1995)

Professional ratings
Review scores
Source	Rating
AllMusic	3/5 stars

Love Attack is the eighteenth studio album by American soul musician Isaac Hayes. The album was released on September 20, 1988, by Columbia/CBS Records. It features a new version of Jerry Butler's "I Stand Accused", which Hayes already covered on his 1970 album The Isaac Hayes Movement and a cover of Billy Joel’s "She's Got a Way". Like the previous album U-Turn, Love Attack features mainly synthesizers and drum machines, and the same team of musicians including Gerald Jackson and Bill Mueller.

== Track listing ==
No.	Title	Writer(s)	Length
1.	"Love Attack"	Isaac Hayes	5:35
2.	"Let Me Be Your Everything"	Isaac Hayes	6:41
3.	"Showdown"	Isaac Hayes	6:24
4.	"Eye of the Storm"	Isaac Hayes	4:25
5.	"Accused Rap"	Isaac Hayes	4:46
6.	"I Stand Accused '88" (featuring Brenda Jones Williams)	Jerry Butler, William Butler	5:40
7.	"She's Got a Way"	Billy Joel	4:28
8.	"Foreplay Rap"	Isaac Hayes	1:59
9.	"Love Won't Let Me Wait" (featuring Yasmin Jones)	Bobby Eli, Vinnie Barrett	5:41

== Personnel ==
- Isaac Hayes – vocal, synthesizers, acoustic piano, computer programming
- Gerald Jackson – synthesizers, drum machine programming
- Bill Mueller – guitar
- Ronnie Garrett – bass guitar
- Myra Walker and Brenda Jones Williams – backing vocals
- Produced and arranged by Isaac Hayes
- Recorded and mixed by Ron Christopher
- Mastered by Glen Meadows
- Cover design & photos Allen Weinberg and William Coupon
