= ...To Be Continued (Isaac Hayes album) =

Studio album by Isaac Hayes
- Released: November 28, 1970
- Recorded: Summer 1970
- Genre: Soul; jazz; funk
- Length: 42:03
- Label: Enterprise
- Producer: Isaac Hayes

Isaac Hayes chronology
The Isaac Hayes Movement (1970)	...To Be Continued (1970)	Shaft (1971)

Singles from ...To Be Continued
- 1. "The Look of Love / Ike's Mood I" Released: January 1971

...To Be Continued is the fourth studio album by American soul musician Isaac Hayes, issued in 1970 on Stax Records' Enterprise label. The LP includes Hayes' cover of the Burt Bacharach/Hal David composition "The Look of Love", which was issued as a single in an edited form, peaking at #79 on the Billboard Hot 100. Hayes had covered Bacharach/David songs on his previous albums Hot Buttered Soul ("Walk On By") and The Isaac Hayes Movement ("I Just Don't Know What to Do With Myself").

The ...To Be Continued album as a whole peaked at #1 on the Billboard Black Albums and Jazz Albums charts, and at #11 on the Billboard 200.

Professional ratings
Review scores
Source	Rating
AllMusic	4/5 stars

== Track listing ==
Side one
No.	Title	Writer(s)	Length
1.	"Ike's Rap I"	Isaac Hayes	3:59
2.	"Our Day Will Come"	Bob Hilliard, Mort Garson	5:27
3.	"The Look of Love"	Burt Bacharach, Hal David	11:13

Side two
No.	Title	Writer(s)	Length
1.	"Medley: "Ike's Mood I" / "You've Lost That Lovin' Feelin'"	Hayes/Phil Spector, Barry Mann, Cynthia Weil	15:33
2.	"Runnin' Out of Fools"	Kay Rogers, Richard Ahlert	5:52

== Personnel ==
- Isaac Hayes - vocals, producer, arranger, piano, electric piano, bongos, timpani, vibraphone
- Dale Warren - arranger
- Pat Lewis - backing vocal arranger
- The Bar-Kays: instrumentation
  - James Alexander - bass guitar
  - Cliff Acred - bass guitar
  - Ben Cauley - trumpet
  - Michael Toles - guitar
  - Ronnie Gordon - keyboards
  - Harvey Henderson - saxophone
  - Roy Cunningham - drums
  - Willie Hall - drums
- Hot Buttered Soul Unlimited - backing vocals
- William Brown, Henry Bush, Ron Capone - engineers
- Joe Tarantino - mastering
- David Krieger - art direction
- Herb Kole - art supervisor
- Joel Brodsky - photography
- The Memphis Horns and the Memphis Symphony Orchestra: instrumentation
  - Richard "Johnny" Davis - trumpet
  - Bill Bell - trombone
  - Ernie Bernhardt - trumpet
  - Jackie Thomas - trombone
  - Edwin Hubbard - flute
  - Robert Snyder - violin
  - Ann Spurbeck - violin
  - James Terry - flute
  - Nick Vergos - English horn, oboe
  - John Wehlan - violin
  - Vincent de Frank - cello
  - Joe De'Gerolamo - French horn
  - Ed Freudberg - violin
  - Gloria Hendricks - violin
  - Nino Ravarino - viola
  - Hal Saunders - violin
  - Joan Gilbert - violin
  - John Davis - trumpet
  - Jack Fonville - flute
  - D'Gerolamo - French horn
  - Richard Dolph - French horn
  - Noel Gilbert - violin

== Certifications ==
Region	Certification	Certified units/sales
United States (RIAA)	Gold	500,000^{^}
^{^} Shipments figures based on certification alone.

== See also ==
- List of number-one R&B albums of 1970 (U.S.)
- List of number-one R&B albums of 1971 (U.S.)
