= List of Billboard 200 number-one albums of 1971 =

These are the Billboard number-one pop albums of 1971.

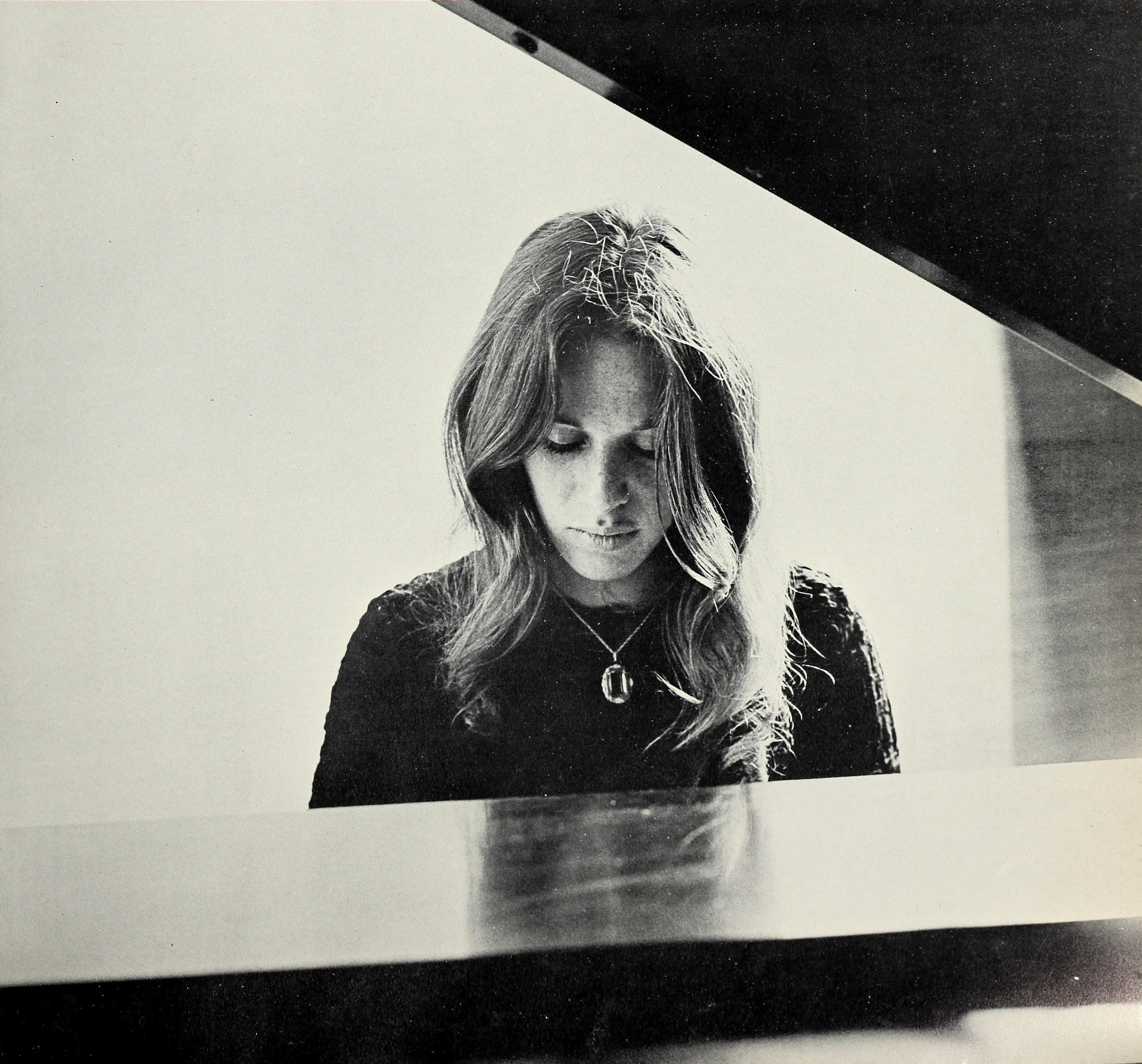
Tapestry by Carole King spent 15 weeks at number one, the most of any album in 1971.

== Chart history ==
Key
†	Indicates best performing album of 1971

Issue date	Album	Artist(s)	Label	Ref.
January 2	All Things Must Pass	George Harrison	Apple	
January 9	All Things Must Pass	George Harrison	Apple	
January 16	All Things Must Pass	George Harrison	Apple	
January 23	All Things Must Pass	George Harrison	Apple	
January 30	All Things Must Pass	George Harrison	Apple	
February 6	All Things Must Pass	George Harrison	Apple	
February 13	All Things Must Pass	George Harrison	Apple	
February 20	Jesus Christ Superstar †	Various Artists	Decca	
February 27	Pearl	Janis Joplin	Columbia	
March 6	Pearl	Janis Joplin	Columbia	
March 13	Pearl	Janis Joplin	Columbia	
March 20	Pearl	Janis Joplin	Columbia	
March 27	Pearl	Janis Joplin	Columbia	
April 3	Pearl	Janis Joplin	Columbia	
April 10	Pearl	Janis Joplin	Columbia	
April 17	Pearl	Janis Joplin	Columbia	
April 24	Pearl	Janis Joplin	Columbia	
May 1	Jesus Christ Superstar †	Various Artists	Decca	
May 8	Jesus Christ Superstar †	Various Artists	Decca	
May 15	4 Way Street	Crosby, Stills, Nash & Young	Atlantic	
May 22	Sticky Fingers	The Rolling Stones	Rolling Stones	
May 29	Sticky Fingers	The Rolling Stones	Rolling Stones	
June 5	Sticky Fingers	The Rolling Stones	Rolling Stones	
June 12	Sticky Fingers	The Rolling Stones	Rolling Stones	
June 19	Tapestry	Carole King	Ode 70	
June 26	Tapestry	Carole King	Ode 70	
July 3	Tapestry	Carole King	Ode 70	
July 10	Tapestry	Carole King	Ode 70	
July 17	Tapestry	Carole King	Ode 70	
July 24	Tapestry	Carole King	Ode 70	
July 31	Tapestry	Carole King	Ode 70	
August 7	Tapestry	Carole King	Ode 70	
August 14	Tapestry	Carole King	Ode 70	
August 21	Tapestry	Carole King	Ode 70	
August 28	Tapestry	Carole King	Ode 70	
September 4	Tapestry	Carole King	Ode 70	
September 11	Tapestry	Carole King	Ode 70	
September 18	Tapestry	Carole King	Ode 70	
September 25	Tapestry	Carole King	Ode 70	
October 2	Every Picture Tells a Story	Rod Stewart	Mercury	
October 9	Every Picture Tells a Story	Rod Stewart	Mercury	
October 16	Every Picture Tells a Story	Rod Stewart	Mercury	
October 23	Every Picture Tells a Story	Rod Stewart	Mercury	
October 30	Imagine	John Lennon	Apple	
November 6	Shaft	Isaac Hayes / Soundtrack	Enterprise	
November 13	Santana III	Santana	Columbia	
November 20	Santana III	Santana	Columbia	
November 27	Santana III	Santana	Columbia	
December 4	Santana III	Santana	Columbia	
December 11	Santana III	Santana	Columbia	
December 18	There's a Riot Goin' On	Sly & the Family Stone	Epic	
December 25	There's a Riot Goin' On	Sly & the Family Stone	Epic	

== See also ==
- 1971 in music
- List of number-one albums (United States)
