= Branded (Isaac Hayes album) =

Studio album by Isaac Hayes
- Released: May 23, 1995
- Recorded: 1995
- Genre: Funk
- Length: 64:11
- Label: Pointblank/Virgin/EMI
- Producer: Isaac Hayes

Isaac Hayes chronology
Raw & Refined (1995)	Branded (1995)

Professional ratings
Review scores
Source	Rating
AllMusic	4/5 stars
Christgau's Consumer Guide	(neither)
Entertainment Weekly	B+
Muzik	4.5/5 stars
NME	9/10
Select	3/5 medals

Branded is the twentieth and final studio album by the American soul musician Isaac Hayes. It was released on May 23, 1995, by Pointblank/Virgin/EMI Records.

== Track listing ==
All tracks are written by Isaac Hayes, except where indicated.

No.	Title	Writer(s)	Length
1.	"Ike's Plea"		1:19
2.	"Life's Mood"		2:52
3.	"Fragile"	Sting	6:21
4.	"Life's Mood II"		3:21
5.	"Summer in the City"	John Sebastian, Mark Sebastian, Steve Boone	6:55
6.	"Let Me Love You"		4:42
7.	"I'll Do Anything (To Turn You On)"		7:45
8.	"Thanks to the Fool"	Hayes, David Porter	7:40
9.	"Branded"		7:02
10.	"Soulsville"		4:09
11.	"Hyperbolicsyllabicsesquedalymistic"	Hayes, Alvertis Isbell	12:00
