= Joy (Isaac Hayes album) =

Studio album by Isaac Hayes
- Released: October 1973
- Recorded: April – May 1973
- Genre: Funk
- Length: 47:28
- Label: Enterprise; EQS-5007
- Producer: Isaac Hayes

Isaac Hayes chronology
Live at the Sahara Tahoe (1973)	Joy (1973)	Tough Guys (1974)

Professional ratings
Review scores
Source	Rating
AllMusic	4/5 stars
The Encyclopedia of Popular Music	2/5 stars
The Rolling Stone Album Guide	2.5/5 stars

Joy is the sixth studio album by American soul musician Isaac Hayes. The album was released in October 1973 by Stax Records' Enterprise imprint.

The album peaked at No. 16 on the Billboard 200.

== Critical reception ==
In its obituary of Hayes, the Los Angeles Times called the title track "epic" and "maybe the most sensual outing he ever recorded."

== Track listing ==
All tracks composed by Isaac Hayes, except where indicated

No.	Title	Writer(s)	Length
1.	"Joy"		15:55
2.	"I Love You That's All"	Isaac Hayes, Randall Stewart, Willie Hall	6:13
3.	"A Man Will Be a Man"		7:20
4.	"The Feeling Keeps On Coming"		6:48
5.	"I'm Gonna Make It (Without You)"		11:11

== Personnel ==
- Isaac Hayes - vocals, male vocals arrangements
- Isaac Hayes Movement, the Memphis Strings, the Movement Horns - accompaniment
- Hot Buttered Soul Unlimited - backing vocals
- Pat Lewis - female vocals arrangements
- Johnny Allen - arrangements
