= U-Turn (Isaac Hayes album) =

Studio album by Isaac Hayes
- Released: 1986
- Recorded: 1986
- Genre: Funk
- Length: 44:07
- Label: Columbia/CBS
- Producer: Isaac Hayes

Isaac Hayes chronology
Lifetime Thing (1981)	U-Turn (1986)	Love Attack (1988)

U-Turn is a studio album by the American musician Isaac Hayes, released in 1986 on Columbia Records. It was his first album in five years. "Ike's Rap VIII" was a minor radio hit.

== Critical reception ==
The Chicago Tribune called the album "slickly funky to the point of self-parody." The Atlanta Journal-Constitution deemed it "a solid collection of dance-oriented tunes and bedroom-bound ballads." Nick Coleman of NME said, "The pulse is slowly reduced to bellycrawl and the voice heaves like a dopey mastodon in a swamp, but all the tunes save "Doesn't Rain In London" lack the narrative/poetic extravagance which made his cover versions such essential listening back when trousers were trousers."

== Track listing ==
No.	Title	Writer(s)	Length
1.	"If You Want My Lovin', Do Me Right"	Bernard Jackson, David Conley, David Townsend	4:30
2.	"Flash Backs"	Jackson, Conley, Townsend	4:29
3.	"You Turn Me On"	Jackson, Conley, Townsend	4:43
4.	"Ike's Rap VIII"	Isaac Hayes	3:22
5.	"Hey Girl"	Carole King, Gerry Goffin	5:45
6.	"Doesn't Rain in London"	Hayes	5:29
7.	"Can't Take My Eyes Off You"	Bob Gaudio, Bob Crewe	6:17
8.	"Thing for You"	Hayes	5:28
9.	"Thank God for Love"	Hayes, Pamela Phillips Oland	4:04
