= Lifetime Thing =

Studio album by Isaac Hayes
- Released: 1981
- Recorded: 1981
- Genre: Soul, disco
- Length: 36:25
- Label: Polydor
- Producer: Isaac Hayes

Isaac Hayes chronology
And Once Again (1980)	Lifetime Thing (1981)	U-Turn (1986)

Lifetime Thing is the sixteenth studio album by American soul musician Isaac Hayes. The album was released in 1981, by Polydor Records.

== Track listing ==
All tracks composed by Isaac Hayes; except where indicated

No.	Title	Writer(s)	Length
1.	"I'm Gonna Make You Love Me"	Jerry Ross, Jerry Williams, Jr., Kenneth Gamble	7:32
2.	"Three Times a Lady"	Lionel Richie	8:03
3.	"Fugitive"		4:00
4.	"Lifetime Thing"		5:37
5.	"Summer"		5:36
6.	"I'm So Proud"	Curtis Mayfield	5:37
