= Groove-A-Thon =

Studio album by Isaac Hayes
- Released: 1976
- Recorded: 1976
- Studio: Hot Buttered Soul, Memphis, Tennessee
- Genre: Disco, soul, funk
- Length: 41:44
- Label: Hot Buttered Soul/ABC
- Producer: Isaac Hayes

Isaac Hayes chronology
Disco Connection (1975)	Groove-A-Thon (1976)	Juicy Fruit (Disco Freak) (1976)

Professional ratings
Review scores
Source	Rating
AllMusic	2/5 stars

Groove-A-Thon is the ninth studio album by American soul musician Isaac Hayes. The album was released in 1976. The album debuted at number 45 on the Billboard 200.

== Track listing ==
All tracks composed by Isaac Hayes

No.	Title	Length
1.	"Groove-A-Thon"	9:47
2.	"Your Loving Is Much Too Strong"	5:39
3.	"Rock Me Easy Baby"	8:14
4.	"We've Got a Whole Lot of Love"	5:38
5.	"Wish You Were Here (You Ought to Be Here)"	5:52
6.	"Make a Little Love to Me"	6:19
