= Hot Buttered Soul =

1969 studio album by Isaac Hayes

Studio album by Isaac Hayes
- Released: June 1969
- Recorded: March – May 1969
- Studios: Ardent (Memphis, Tennessee); Tera Shirma (Detroit, Michigan)
- Genres: Progressive soul; psychedelic soul
- Length: 45:24
- Label: Enterprise
- Producers: Al Bell; Marvell Thomas; Allen Jones

Isaac Hayes chronology
Presenting Isaac Hayes (1968)	Hot Buttered Soul (1969)	The Isaac Hayes Movement (1970)

Singles from Hot Buttered Soul
- 1. "Walk On By" / "By the Time I Get to Phoenix" Released: July 1969

Hot Buttered Soul is the second studio album by American soul musician Isaac Hayes. Released in June 1969, it is recognized as a landmark recording in soul music. Recorded with the Bar-Kays, the album features four lengthy tracks, including a 12-minute version of the Burt Bacharach/Hal David song "Walk On By" and an almost 19-minute long version of Jimmy Webb's "By the Time I Get to Phoenix;" both songs were edited significantly and released as a double A-side single in July 1969.

== Background ==
Hayes' 1968 solo debut, Presenting Isaac Hayes, had been a poor seller for the record label Stax Records, and Hayes was about to return to his behind-the-scenes role as a producer and songwriter, when the label suddenly lost its entire back catalog after splitting with Atlantic Records in May 1968.

Stax executive Al Bell decided to release an almost-instant back catalog of 27 albums and 30 singles at once, and ordered all of Stax's artists to record new material, encouraging some of Stax's prominent creative staff, including Hayes and guitarist Steve Cropper, to record solo albums.

After feeling burned by the retail and creative flop of his first album, Hayes told Bell that he would not record a follow-up or any other album unless he was granted complete creative control. Since Bell had encouraged Hayes to record Presenting... in the first place, he readily agreed.

== Production ==
Produced by Al Bell with Allen Jones and Marvell Thomas, the record was tracked by engineer Terry Manning at the Ardent Studios location on National Street in Memphis. The Bar-Kays were the tracking band, supplemented by pianist and co-producer Marvell Thomas (son of Rufus Thomas). Isaac Hayes played Hammond organ and sang the vocals live while conducting the tracking band at the same time. Much of the later production was done as part of the package of products brought to Detroit by producer Don Davis to expedite the production process. The strings and horns were arranged by Detroit arranger Johnny Allen and were recorded at United Sound Studios by engineer Ed Wolfrum with vocals and final mix at Tera Shirma by engineer Russ Terrana. The producers were looking for a sweeping orchestral sound that would enhance the rhythm tracks. The pre-delay reverberation technique, recorded in part by Terry Manning on the tracking session, had been used at Artie Fields productions in Detroit in late 1950s, and at Columbia Records; it was also used by Wolfrum and others for numerous productions and commercials previous and after the release of this project including Marvin Gaye's What's Going On project, with orchestration also recorded at United. Russ Terrana went on to the engineering staff of Motown Records and was responsible for the recording and mixing of many hits on that label.

== Critical reception ==
Professional ratings
Review scores
Source	Rating
AllMusic	5/5 stars
BBC	(favourable)
Robert Christgau	C
MusicHound Lounge	5/5 stars
Paste	9.7/10
Pitchfork	9.2/10
Rhapsody	favorable
Rolling Stone	4/5 stars
Stereo Review	(favourable)

The album was released in June 1969 and peaked at number 1 on the top R&B chart, and at number 8 on the Billboard 200. The edited single version of "Walk On By" reached No. 30 on the Billboard Hot 100, and the edited single version of "By the Time I Get to Phoenix" reached No. 37 on the same chart.

Contemporary and retrospective reviews of the album were highly positive. AllMusic ranks Hot Buttered Soul as one of the best records of Hayes's career, perhaps second only to 1971's Black Moses, and said the album pioneered new developments in R&B music for the 1970s. In 2020, Rolling Stone ranked the album at number 373 on its list of the 500 Greatest Albums of All Time.

American punk rock musician Henry Rollins has frequently referred to Hot Buttered Soul as one of his favorite albums. Rollins interviewed Hayes in 1995 for Details magazine, and the interview was reprinted in the 1998 book Do I Come Here Often? Black Coffee Blues, Part 2.

Evan Minsker of Pitchfork wrote in 2017: "Hayes didn’t have any grand sales ambitions for Hot Buttered Soul, but his long cuts and high drama made him a star, one who pried the creative doors open for the artists who followed."

== Track listing ==
Side one
No.	Title	Writer(s)	Length
1.	"Walk On By"	Burt Bacharach, Hal David	12:03
2.	"Hyperbolicsyllabicsesquedalymistic"	Isaac Hayes, Alvertis Isbell	9:38

Side two
No.	Title	Writer(s)	Length
1.	"One Woman"	Charles Chalmers, Sandra Rhodes	5:10
2.	"By the Time I Get to Phoenix"	Jimmy Webb	18:42

== Personnel ==
- Isaac Hayes – vocals, keyboards
- Marvell Thomas – producer, keyboards
- Harold Beane – guitar solo on "Walk On By"

The Bar-Kays:

- Willie Hall – drums
- James Alexander – bass
- Michael Toles – guitar

Technical

- Al Bell – producer, supervising producer
- Bill Dahl – liner notes
- Kate Hoddinott – package redesign
- Allen Jones – producer
- Johnny Allen – arranger
- Terry Manning – engineer
- Bob Smith – photography
- Joe Tarantino – mastering
- Russ Terrana – remixing
- Honeya Thompson – art direction
- Christopher Whorf – cover design
- Ed Wolfrum – engineer, mixing

== Charts ==
=== Weekly charts ===
Weekly chart performance for Hot Buttered Soul
Chart (1969)	Peak position
US Billboard Top LPs	8
US Hot R&B LPs (Billboard)	1

== Certifications ==
Region	Certification	Certified units/sales
United States (RIAA)	Gold	500,000^{^}
^{^} Shipments figures based on certification alone.

== See also ==
- Album era
- List of number-one R&B albums of 1969 (U.S.)
