= Three Tough Guys =

1974 film

- Directed by: Duccio Tessari
- Screenplay by: Luciano Vincenzoni; Nicola Badalucco
- Story by: Luciano Vincenzoni; Nicola Badalucco
- Produced by: Dino De Laurentiis
- Starring: Lino Ventura; Isaac Hayes; Fred Williamson; Vittorio Sanipoli
- Cinematography: Aldo Tonti
- Edited by: Mario Morra
- Music by: Isaac Hayes
- Production companies: Produzioni Cinematografiche Inter. Ma. Co.; Columbia Film
- Distributed by: Titanus
- Release dates: 15 March 1974 (New York); 29 May 1974 (France); 13 August 1974 (Italy)
- Running time: 92 minutes
- Countries: Italy; France
- Box office: ₤761.271 million

Three Tough Guys (also known as Tough Guys) is a 1974 crime-action film directed by Duccio Tessari. It stars Lino Ventura, Fred Williamson and Isaac Hayes, who also composed the soundtrack. It is a coproduction between United States, Italy (where it was released titled Uomini duri) and France (where it is known as Les Durs). The film was shot in Chicago.

== Plot ==
Roman Catholic priest Father Charlie and former police officer Lee solve a bank robbery mystery that stretches across the city. After Lee is removed from the force due to $1,000,000 being stolen from the bank, Father Charlie helps him to gain revenge for the loss of one of his friends.

== Cast ==
- Lino Ventura as Father Charlie
- Isaac Hayes as Lee Samuels
- Fred Williamson as Joe "Snake" Marshall
- Paula Kelly as Fay
- William Berger as Captain Ryan
- Vittorio Sanipoli as Mike Petralia
- Lorella De Luca as Anne Lombardo
- Mario Erpichini as Gene Lombardo
- Jess Hahn as The Bartender
- Jacques Herlin as Mike Petralia
- Guido Leontini as Sergeant Sam
- Luciano Salce as The Bishop
- Nazzareno Zamperla as Snake's Henchman

== Production ==
Three Tough Guys was filmed in Rome and on location in Chicago between September 4 and October 1973. The film was Isaac Hayes' acting debut.

== Release ==
Three Tough Guys opened in New York on March 15, 1974. was released in France under the title Les durs on May 29, 1974. It was released in Italy under the title Uomini duri where it was distributed by Titanus. It grossed a total of 761.271 million Italian lire. Italian film historian and critic Roberto Curti said this gross was "moderate, but not outstanding success" as it had grossed less than half of Enzo G. Castellari's Street Law.

== Soundtrack ==
Tough Guys

Soundtrack album by Isaac Hayes
- Released: March 12, 1974
- Recorded: 1974
- Genre: Progressive soul, funk
- Length: 33:27
- Label: Enterprise; ENS-7504
- Producer: Isaac Hayes

Isaac Hayes chronology
Joy (1973)	Tough Guys (1974)	Truck Turner (1974)

Professional ratings
Review scores
Source	Rating
AllMusic	2/5 stars

The soundtrack was composed, conducted and performed by Isaac Hayes, with string arrangements performed by the Memphis Symphony Orchestra and rhythm tracks performed by Isaac Hayes' band the Movement. The original LP record, Tough Guys, was released by Enterprise Records, an imprint of Stax Records.

The main theme of Three Tough Guys would be used in Quentin Tarantino's Kill Bill Vol. 2. "Hung Up on My Baby" was sampled in the Geto Boys song "Mind Playing Tricks on Me."

=== Original track listing ===
Side one

1. "Title Theme" - 2:32
2. "Randolph & Dearborn" - 4:24
3. "The Red Rooster" - 4:04
4. "Joe Bell" - 4:57

Side two

1. "Hung Up On My Baby" - 6:15
2. "Kidnapped" - 2:40
3. "Run Fay Run" - 2:45
4. "Buns O' Plenty" - 4:37
5. "The End Theme" - 1:13

== Notes ==
=== References ===
- Curti, Roberto (2013). Italian Crime Filmography, 1968-1980. McFarland. ISBN 978-0786469765.
