= Chocolate Chip (album) =

Studio album by Isaac Hayes
- Released: June 1975
- Recorded: Spring 1975
- Studio: Hot Buttered Soul, Memphis, Tennessee
- Genre: Disco, funk, soul
- Length: 40:32
- Label: Hot Buttered Soul/ABC
- Producer: Isaac Hayes

Isaac Hayes chronology
Truck Turner (1974)	Chocolate Chip (1975)	Disco Connection (1975)

Professional ratings
Review scores
Source	Rating
AllMusic	3/5 stars

Chocolate Chip is the seventh studio album by American soul musician Isaac Hayes. It was released in 1975 by ABC Records through Hayes' own imprint, Hot Buttered Soul Records, marking Hayes' first release after leaving the then-financially troubled Stax label. The album was Hayes's segue into the emerging disco scene and featured horns and layered beats, while maintaining his traditional soulful vocals. “Chocolate Chip” was certified Gold by the RIAA for sales of over 500,000 copies. It reached number one on the Billboard R&B Albums chart the week ending August 9, 1975, and stayed in the top position for two weeks. It was his seventh and final number one album.

== Track listing ==
All songs written by Isaac Hayes except where noted.

No.	Title	Length
1.	"That Loving Feeling" (Tony Joe White)	6:36
2.	"Body Language"	5:32
3.	"Chocolate Chip"	5:32
4.	"Chocolate Chip" (instrumental)	5:32
5.	"I Want to Make Love to You So Bad"	4:17
6.	"Come Live with Me"	6:32
7.	"I Can't Turn Around"	6:31

== Personnel ==
- Isaac Hayes - producer, arranger, vocals, acoustic piano, Fender Rhodes, RMI keyboard computer, concert bells
- Emerson Able - flute, alto saxophone
- Ben Cauley - trumpet
- Lewis Collins - flute, tenor saxophone
- Bill Easley - flute, alto saxophone
- Roosevelt "Head" Green - engineer
- Jack Hale - trombone
- Willie Hall - drums
- The Movement - guest artist
- Floyd Newman - flute, baritone saxophone
- Darrell Smith - flute, Tenor saxophone
- Lester Snell - Fender Rhodes
- Errol Thomas - guitar, bass
- Jackie Thomas - trombone
- Fred Valentine - photography

=== Charts ===
Chart (1975)	Peak position
Australian Albums (Kent Music Report)	47
US Billboard 200	18
US Top R&B/Hip-Hop Albums (Billboard)	1

== See also ==
- List of number-one R&B albums of 1975 (U.S.)
