= For the Sake of Love =

Studio album by Isaac Hayes
- Released: 1978
- Recorded: 1978
- Studio: Mastersound, Atlanta, Georgia
- Genre: Disco
- Length: 41:06
- Label: Polydor
- Producer: Isaac Hayes

Isaac Hayes chronology
New Horizon (1977)	For the Sake of Love (1978)	HotBed (1978)

For the Sake of Love is the twelfth studio album by the American musician Isaac Hayes, released in 1978 by Polydor Records. The album peaked at number 75 on the Billboard 200.

== Critical reception ==
Professional ratings
Review scores
Source	Rating
AllMusic	3/5 stars
The Virgin Encyclopedia of R&B and Soul	1/5 stars

Music Week wrote that Hayes delivers "a couple of his lengthy trademark covers, funky disco fare including an update of his masterpiece 'Shaft', and some more reflective, slower rap-infused pieces of his own."

== Track listing ==
All tracks composed by Isaac Hayes; except where indicated

No.	Title	Writer(s)	Length
1.	"Just the Way You Are"	Billy Joel	9:17
2.	"Believe in Me"		5:20
3.	"If We Ever Needed Peace"		5:17
4.	"Shaft II"		9:51
5.	"Zeke the Freak"		4:31
6.	"Don't Let Me Be Lonely Tonight"	James Taylor	6:50
