= Live at the Sahara Tahoe =

Live album by Isaac Hayes
- Released: April 1973
- Recorded: November 26, 1972
- Venue: The Sahara Tahoe, Stateline, Nevada
- Genre: Funk; soul
- Label: Enterprise; ENS-2-5005
- Producer: Isaac Hayes

Isaac Hayes chronology
Black Moses (1971)	Live at the Sahara Tahoe (1973)	Joy (1973)

Professional ratings
Review scores
Source	Rating
AllMusic	2/5 stars
Christgau's Record Guide	B−
The Rolling Stone Album Guide	2.5/5 stars

Live at the Sahara Tahoe is the first live album by American soul musician Isaac Hayes, released in 1973 by Stax Records' Enterprise imprint. It was recorded live at the Sahara Hotel & Casino in Stateline, Nevada. The performance was arranged and orchestrated by Onzie Horne.

== Track listing ==
Side one
No.	Title	Writer(s)	Length
1.	"Theme from Shaft"	Isaac Hayes	4:43
2.	"The Come On/Light My Fire"	Hayes/Jim Morrison, Ray Manzarek, John Densmore, Robby Krieger	7:50
3.	"Ike's Rap V/Never Can Say Goodbye"	Hayes/Clifton Davis	8:00
4.	"Windows of the World"	Burt Bacharach, Hal David	7:44

Side two
No.	Title	Writer(s)	Length
1.	"The Look of Love"	Burt Bacharach, Hal David	4:14
2.	"Ellie's Love Theme"	Isaac Hayes	3:18
3.	"Use Me"	Bill Withers	5:10
4.	"Do Your Thing"	Isaac Hayes	7:21
5.	"Theme from The Men"	Isaac Hayes	3:27

Side three
No.	Title	Writer(s)	Length
1.	"It's Too Late"	Carole King, Toni Stern	5:39
2.	"Rock Me Baby"	B.B. King, Joe Josea	5:30
3.	"Stormy Monday Blues"	Aaron Walker	3:05
4.	"Type Thang"	Isaac Hayes	3:29
5.	"The First Time Ever I Saw Your Face"	Ewan MacColl	4:52

Side four
No.	Title	Writer(s)	Length
1.	"Ike's Rap VI/Ain't No Sunshine"	Hayes/Bill Withers	17:05
2.	"Feelin' Alright"	Dave Mason	5:32
