= Track of the Cat (album) =

Studio album by Dionne Warwick
- Released: November 1975
- Studio: Sigma Sound, Philadelphia, Pennsylvania
- Length: 34:34
- Label: Warner Bros.
- Producer: Thom Bell

Dionne Warwick chronology
| Then Came You (1975) | Track of the Cat (1975) | A Man and a Woman (1977) |

Singles from Track of the Cat
- 1. "Once You Hit the Road" Released: October 1975; 2. "His House and Me" Released: March 1976

Track of the Cat is a studio album by the American singer Dionne Warwick. It was released by Warner Bros. Records in 1975 in the United States. Her second album to be released that year, it peaked at number 137 on the US Top LPs & Tape chart.

== Critical reception ==
Professional ratings
Review scores
| Source | Rating |
|---|---|
| AllMusic | 3/5 stars |
| The Rolling Stone Album Guide | 2.5/5 stars |

AllMusic editor Ron Wynn found that Warwick "didn't get it on this 1975 release, as songs like 'Love Me One More Time' and 'Jealousy' were tentatively sung, burdened with unimpressive lyrics, or poorly produced."

== Track listing ==
All tracks produced by Thom Bell. All tracks written by Thom Bell and Linda Creed, except where noted.

Side one
| No. | Title | Length |
|---|---|---|
| 1. | "Track of the Cat" | 6:54 |
| 2. | "His House and Me" | 4:50 |
| 3. | "Ronnie Lee" | 3:39 |
| 4. | "World of My Dreams" | 3:59 |

Side two
| No. | Title | Writer(s) | Length |
|---|---|---|---|
| 5. | "Jealousy" | Sherman Marshall; Ted Wortham; Vinnie Barrett | 3:24 |
| 6. | "This Is Love" | Marshall; Bell | 3:30 |
| 7. | "Love Me One More Time" | | 4:11 |
| 8. | "Once You Hit the Road" | Charles Simmons; Joseph Jefferson | 4:03 |

== Personnel and credits ==
Credits adapted from the liner notes of Track of the Cat.

Musicians

- Dionne Warwick – vocals
- Bobby Eli – guitar
- Bob Babbitt – bass
- Thom Bell – keyboards, arrangements, conductor
- Tony Bell – guitar
- Carla Benson – backing vocals
- Evette Benton – backing vocals
- Charles Collins – drums
- Bruce Hawes – backing vocals
- Carl Helm – backing vocals
- Barbara Ingram – backing vocals
- Joseph Jefferson – backing vocals
- MFSB – horns, strings
- Andrew Smith – drums
- Larry Washington – percussion, congas

Technical

- Don Murray – chief engineer
- Albert Watson – front cover photography

== Charts ==
Chart performance for Track of the Cat
| Chart (1976) | Peak position |
|---|---|
| US Top LP's & Tape (Billboard) | 137 |
| US Soul LP's (Billboard) | 15 |
| US Top 101 to 200 Albums (Cash Box) | 170 |
| US Top 50 R&B Albums (Cash Box) | 18 |
| US The Album Chart (Record World) | 159 |
| US The R&B LP Chart (Record World) | 15 |
