= Disco Connection =

Studio album by Isaac Hayes
- Released: 1975
- Recorded: 1975
- Studio: Hot Buttered Soul, Memphis, Tennessee
- Genre: Funk, disco
- Length: 44:57
- Label: Hot Buttered Soul/ABC
- Producer: Isaac Hayes

Isaac Hayes chronology
Chocolate Chip (1975)	Disco Connection (1975)	Groove-A-Thon (1976)

Professional ratings
Review scores
Source	Rating
AllMusic	3/5 stars

Disco Connection is the eighth studio album by American soul musician Isaac Hayes. The album, credited to his backing band, the Isaac Hayes Movement, was released in 1975. The album debuted at number 85 on the Billboard 200.

== Track listing ==
All tracks composed and arranged by Isaac Hayes

No.	Title	Length
1.	"The First Day of Forever"	4:38
2.	"St. Thomas Square"	5:52
3.	"Vykkii"	4:56
4.	"Disco Connection"	6:14
5.	"Disco Shuffle"	8:12
6.	"Choppers"	4:30
7.	"After Five"	5:00
8.	"Aruba"	5:32

== Personnel ==
- Isaac Hayes - vocals, keyboards, synthesizer
- Charles Pitts, Michael Toles, William Vaughn, Anthony Shinault - guitar
- Errol Thomas - bass guitar
- Lester Snell - keyboards, arrangements
- Sidney Kirk - keyboards
- Willie Hall, Willie Coles - drums, tambourine
- Jimmy Lee Thompson - congas
- Darnell Smith, Tommy Williams - tenor saxophone
- Bill Easely, Emerson Able - alto saxophone
- Floyd Newman - baritone saxophone
- Ben Cauley, Edgar Matthews, Johnny Davis, William Taylor - trumpet, flugelhorn
- Bill Flores, Jackie Thomas - trombone
- Gary Russell - bass trombone
- Bryant Munch, Richard Dolph - French horn
- The Memphis Strings - strings
