= New Horizon (Isaac Hayes album) =

Studio album by Isaac Hayes
- Released: November 1977
- Recorded: 1977
- Genre: Disco, funk, soul
- Length: 37:47
- Label: Polydor
- Producer: Isaac Hayes

Isaac Hayes chronology
Juicy Fruit (Disco Freak) (1976)	New Horizon (1977)	For the Sake of Love (1978)

Professional ratings
Review scores
Source	Rating
AllMusic	3/5 stars

New Horizon is the eleventh studio album by American soul musician Isaac Hayes. The album was released in 1977, by Polydor Records. The album debuted at number 78 on the Billboard 200.

== Track listing ==
All tracks composed by Isaac Hayes; except where indicated

No.	Title	Writer(s)	Length
1.	"Stranger in Paradise"	George Forrest, Robert Craig Wright	10:08
2.	"Moonlight Lovin' (Mènage a Trois)"		10:02
3.	"Don't Take Your Love Away"	Hayes, Lee Hatim	7:33
4.	"Out of the Ghetto"		5:45
5.	"It's Heaven to Me"		4:19
