= Black Moses (album) =

Studio album by Isaac Hayes
- Released: November 1, 1971
- Recorded: March – October 1971
- Genre: Progressive soul
- Length: 93:38
- Label: Enterprise
- Producer: Isaac Hayes

Isaac Hayes chronology
Shaft (1971)	Black Moses (1971)	Live at the Sahara Tahoe (1973)

Singles from Black Moses
- 1. "Never Can Say Goodbye" Released: April 1971

Original LP
- The LP's cover unfolds a poster-sized image of Hayes as "Black Moses". photo by Joel Brodsky

Professional ratings
Review scores
Source	Rating
AllMusic	3.5/5 stars
Clash	(favorable)
Paste	88/100
Pitchfork Media	8.7/10
Record Collector	5/5 stars
Rolling Stone	(unfavorable) 1972
Rolling Stone	2008
Spin	9/10
Uncut	3/5 stars

Black Moses is the fifth studio album by American soul musician Isaac Hayes. It is a double album released on Stax Records' Enterprise label in 1971. The follow-up to Hayes' successful soundtrack for Shaft (also a double album), Black Moses features Hayes' version of the Jackson 5's hit single "Never Can Say Goodbye". Hayes' version became a hit in its own right, peaking at number 22 on the Billboard Hot 100. The album reached number one on the Billboard R&B album chart on January 15, 1972.

Ike's Rap II became a popular track to sample, most notably by Portishead in their song "Glory Box"; other artists who have also sampled the track include Tricky, Alessia Cara, Snoh Aalegra, and Racionais MC's.

== Background ==
In addition to "Never Can Say Goodbye", other selections on Black Moses include covers of songs made popular by The Carpenters ("(They Long to Be) Close to You"), Toussaint McCall ("Nothing Takes the Place of You"), The Friends of Distinction ("Going in Circles"), Dionne Warwick ("I'll Never Fall in Love Again"), and Little Johnny Taylor ("Part Time Love"). Hayes named Black Moses as one of his most personal works.

The album's title derives from Stax executive Dino Woodward's nickname for Hayes, which he bestowed upon the musician after comparing the effects of his music on Black audiences to the leadership of the biblical figure Moses. The then-deeply Christian Hayes shied away from the nickname, finding it "sacrilegious", although journalist Chester Higgins popularized the "Black Moses" nickname in an article he wrote on Hayes for Jet. Hayes came to see "Black Moses" as a symbol of Black pride:

Black men could finally stand up and be men because here's Black Moses; he's the epitome of black masculinity. Chains that once represented bondage and slavery now can be a sign of power and strength and sexuality and virility.

Larry Shaw, head of marketing and publicity at Stax, came up with the idea to title Hayes' LP Black Moses. He also devised, with the assistance of Bar-Kays member Ron Gordon, a gatefold album cover design that unfolded into a poster-sized image of Hayes, dressed in biblical-inspired attire as "Black Moses".

== Track listing ==
Side one
No.	Title	Writer(s)	Length
1.	"Never Can Say Goodbye"	Clifton Davis	5:07
2.	"(They Long to Be) Close to You"	Burt Bacharach, Hal David	8:58
3.	"Nothing Takes the Place of You"	Toussaint McCall, Alan Robinson	5:29
4.	"Man's Temptation"	Curtis Mayfield	4:59
Total length:			24:33

Side two
No.	Title	Writer(s)	Length
5.	"Never Gonna Give You Up"	Kenneth Gamble, Leon Huff, Jerry Butler	5:47
6.	"Medley: 'Ike's Rap II' / 'Help Me Love'"	Hayes, Johnny Baylor, Mickey Gregory, Luther Ingram, Tommy Tate	7:31
7.	"Need to Belong to Someone"	Curtis Mayfield	5:15
8.	"Good Love 6-9969"	Gregory, Hayes	5:15
Total length:			23:48

Side three
No.	Title	Writer(s)	Length
9.	"Medley: 'Ike's Rap III' / 'Your Love is So Doggone Good'"	Hayes, Difosco Ervin, Rudy Love	9:15
10.	"For the Good Times"	Kris Kristofferson	5:20
11.	"I'll Never Fall in Love Again"	Burt Bacharach, Hal David	5:02
Total length:			19:37

Side four
No.	Title	Writer(s)	Length
12.	"Part-Time Love"	Clay Hammond	8:30
13.	"Medley: 'Ike's Rap IV' / 'A Brand New Me'"	Isaac Hayes, Kenneth Gamble, Thom Bell, Jerry Butler	9:40
14.	"Going in Circles"	Jerry Peters, Anita Poree	7:02
Total length:			25:12

Note: Some of the vinyl pressings (and all CD releases) have a non-standard arrangement of the sides: sides 1 and 4 are pressed on one disc along with sides 2 and 3 on the other. This practice, known as "automatic sequence", was intentional on vinyl.

== Personnel ==
- Isaac Hayes - lead and background vocals
- "Hot", "Buttered", and "Soul": backing vocals
- The Bar-Kays, instrumentation: "(They Long to Be) Close to You" and "Going in Circles"
- Instrumentation on all other tracks by The Isaac Hayes Movement:
  - Piano, vibraphone, organ, electric piano - Isaac Hayes
  - Bass - Ronnie Hudson
  - Bongos, congas - Gary Jones
  - Drums, tambourine - Willie Hall
  - Electric piano - Lester Snell
  - Guitar - Charles "Skip" Pitts
  - Piano - Sidney Kirk
- Arranged by Isaac Hayes & Johnny Allen, except "(They Long To Be) Close to You" by Isaac Hayes & Dale Warren
- Engineers: Ron Capone, William Brown, Henry Bush, Eddie Marion, Dave Purple
- Remix engineers: Ron Capone, Dave Purple and Isaac Hayes

== See also ==
- List of number-one R&B albums of 1972 (U.S.)

== Notes ==
- Bowman, Rob (1997). Soulsville U.S.A.: The Story of Stax Records. New York: Schirmer Trade. ISBN 0-8256-7284-8
