= Raw & Refined =

Studio album by Isaac Hayes
- Released: May 23, 1995
- Recorded: 1995
- Genre: Funk
- Length: 66:32
- Label: Pointblank/Virgin/EMI
- Producer: Isaac Hayes, Benny Mabone

Isaac Hayes chronology
| Wonderful (1994) | Raw & Refined (1995) | Branded (1995) |

Raw & Refined is the nineteenth studio album by American soul musician Isaac Hayes. The album was released on May 23, 1995, by Virgin Records.

== Track listing ==
All tracks composed and arranged by Isaac Hayes

| No. | Title | Length |
|---|---|---|
| 1. | "Birth of Shaft" | 3:30 |
| 2. | "Urban Nights" | 4:30 |
| 3. | "Funkalicious" | 5:37 |
| 4. | "Tahoe Spring" | 4:27 |
| 5. | "The Night Before" | 4:41 |
| 6. | "Memphis Trax" | 3:38 |
| 7. | "Soul Fiddle" | 6:35 |
| 8. | "Funky Junky" | 7:02 |
| 9. | "You Make Me Live" | 3:45 |
| 10. | "Making Love At the Ocean" | 5:42 |
| 11. | "Southern Breeze" | 5:55 |
| 12. | "Didn't Know Love Was So Good" | 3:50 |
| 13. | "The 405" | 6:42 |
