= Juicy Fruit (Disco Freak) =

Studio album by Isaac Hayes
- Released: 1976
- Recorded: 1976
- Studios: Hot Buttered Soul, Memphis, Tennessee
- Genres: Disco, soul
- Length: 41:28
- Label: Hot Buttered Soul/ABC
- Producer: Isaac Hayes

Isaac Hayes chronology
Groove-A-Thon (1976)	Juicy Fruit (Disco Freak) (1976)	New Horizon (1977)

Professional ratings
Review scores
Source	Rating
AllMusic	2.5/5 stars
Paste	67/100
Pitchfork Media	5.0/10

Juicy Fruit (Disco Freak) is the tenth studio album by American soul musician Isaac Hayes. The album was released in 1976. The album debuted at number 124 on the Billboard 200.

== Track listing ==
All tracks composed by Isaac Hayes

No.	Title	Length
1.	"Juicy Fruit (Disco Freak)"	6:17
2.	"Let's Don't Ever Blow Our Thing"	6:07
3.	"The Storm Is Over"	4:44
4.	"Music to Make Love By"	6:26
5.	"Thank You Love"	4:50
6.	"Lady of the Night"	4:09
7.	"Love Me or Lose Me"	5:33
