= And Once Again (album) =

Studio album by Isaac Hayes
- Released: 1980
- Recorded: 1980
- Genre: Soul, disco
- Length: 39:10
- Label: Polydor
- Producer: Isaac Hayes

Isaac Hayes chronology
Don't Let Go (1979)	And Once Again (1980)	Lifetime Thing (1981)

Professional ratings
Review scores
Source	Rating
AllMusic	3/5 stars

And Once Again is the fifteenth studio album by American soul musician Isaac Hayes. The album was released in 1980, by Polydor Records. The album debuted at number 164 and reached number 59 on the Billboard 200.

== Track listing ==
All tracks composed by Isaac Hayes; except where indicated

No.	Title	Writer(s)	Length
1.	"It's All in the Game"	Carl Sigman, Charles G. Dawes	5:34
2.	"Ike's Rap VII / This Time I'll Be Sweeter"	Hayes / Gwen Guthrie, Patrick Grant	13:34
3.	"I Ain't Never"		7:23
4.	"Wherever You Are"		5:40
5.	"Love Has Been Good to Us"		6:59
