= Shaft (Isaac Hayes album) =

Soundtrack album by Isaac Hayes
- Released: July 23, 1971
- Recorded: 1971
- Studio: Stax, Memphis, Tennessee
- Genre: Progressive soul; psychedelic soul
- Length: 69:29
- Label: Enterprise; ENS-2-5002
- Producer: Isaac Hayes

Isaac Hayes chronology
...To Be Continued (1970)	Shaft (1971)	Black Moses (1971)

Singles from Shaft
- 1. "Theme from Shaft" Released: September 30, 1971; 2. "Do Your Thing" Released: January 1972

Shaft is a double album by Isaac Hayes, recorded for Stax Records' Enterprise label as the soundtrack LP for Metro-Goldwyn-Mayer's 1971 blaxploitation film Shaft. The album mostly consists of instrumentals composed by Hayes as score for the film. Three vocal selections are included: "Soulsville", "Do Your Thing", and "Theme from Shaft". A commercial and critical success, Shaft is Hayes' best-known work and the best-selling LP ever released on a Stax label.

In 2014, the album was added to the National Recording Registry by the Library of Congress for being "culturally, historically, or aesthetically significant."

== Conception ==
Hayes initially became involved with Shaft in hopes of having director Gordon Parks cast him in the title role, because he was not aware that Richard Roundtree had already been cast as John Shaft. Hayes did appear in the film in a cameo role, but, more significantly, composed the film's score. While the film was still in production, Parks sent Hayes raw footage of some of the film's scenes, and Hayes wrote three pieces for the scenes: "Theme from Shaft" for the opening title sequence, "Soulsville" for a scene in which Shaft walks through Harlem, and "Ellie's Love Theme" for a love scene.

Pleased with the results, MGM hired Hayes to compose the rest of the score, and Hayes spent two months working between tour dates on the score at the MGM studio. Once the score was composed and arranged, Hayes recorded the rhythm tracks with Stax band The Bar-Kays in one day. The orchestral tracks were recorded the next day, and the vocals the day after that. The songs were later re-recorded for the album at Stax Studios and slightly rearranged from their film versions: MGM's recording facility was based upon a three-track system, and Hayes wanted a richer sound for the album.

== Reception ==
Professional ratings
Review scores
Source	Rating
AllMusic	4.5/5 stars
Christgau's Record Guide	C+
Pitchfork Media	8.5/10
Q	4/5 stars

Upon its release in the summer of 1971, Shaft became the first double album of original studio material released by an R&B artist. The album peaked at number one on The Billboard 200 chart, and spent sixty weeks on the chart. It took the top position on the Top R&B Albums chart for 14 weeks. It achieved Platinum status within a month of its release. Both "Theme from Shaft" and "Do Your Thing" became Top 40 singles on the Billboard Hot 100 chart, with the former peaking at number one.

At the 1972 Grammy Awards, "Theme from Shaft" won the awards for Best Engineered Recording, Non-Classical and Best Instrumental Arrangement. The film score as a whole won for Best Instrumental Composition Written Specifically For A Motion Picture or for Television. The National Association of Television and Radio Announcers gave Shaft its Album of the Year award. At the Academy Awards that year, Hayes became the first African-American to win an Oscar for a non-acting category when "Theme from Shaft" won the award for Best Original Song. Isaac Hayes was nominated for Original Dramatic Score as well, losing to Michel Legrand for the score to Summer of '42.

In a 2020 retrospective on the Shaft franchise, RetroFan stated that "Hayes' score helped change the way music was used in film, bringing in a more contemporary, funk/soul-driven sound. It had an especially significant impact on the coming wave of black films, setting the standard for how R&B music would be used in films, and marketed alongside of individual movies."

The 2009 re-release of the soundtrack on CD by Stax Records added an additional track, "Theme from Shaft" (2009 Mix), timed at 4:45.

The 2019 re-release on 2 CDs by Craft Recordings includes remastered Original Soundtrack and 22 bonus tracks from the Original Score.

== Track listing ==
All songs written and produced by Isaac Hayes.

=== Side one ===
1. "Theme from Shaft" (Vocal Version) – 4:39
2. "Bumpy's Lament" – 1:51
3. "Walk from Regio's" – 2:24
4. "Ellie's Love Theme" – 3:18
5. "Shaft's Cab Ride" – 1:10

=== Side two ===
1. "Cafe Regio's" – 6:10
2. "Early Sunday Morning" – 3:49
3. "Be Yourself" – 4:30
4. "A Friend's Place" – 3:24

=== Side three ===
1. "Soulsville" (Vocal Version) – 3:48
2. "No Name Bar" – 6:11
3. "Bumpy's Blues" – 4:04
4. "Shaft Strikes Again" – 3:04

=== Side four ===
1. "Do Your Thing" (Vocal Version) – 19:30
2. "The End Theme" – 1:56

== Personnel ==
- Lead vocals (tracks A1, C1, D1), keyboards (All tracks), and lyrics (A1, C1, D1): Isaac Hayes
- Rhythm, horn and string arrangements by Johnny Allen (tracks A1–A2, A4–D2), J. J. Johnson (A3), and Isaac Hayes (All tracks)
- Backing vocals by Pat Lewis, Rose Williams and Telma Hopkins (tracks A1, C1, D1)
- Instrumentation by The Bar-Kays and The Isaac Hayes Movement
  - Electric piano: Lester Snell
  - Guitars: Charles Pitts and Michael Toles
  - Bass guitar: James Alexander
  - Drums: Willie Hall
  - Congas, bongos and other percussion: Gary Jones
  - Lead Trumpet: Richard "Johnny" Davis
  - Flute: John Fonville
- Engineers: Ron Capone, Henry Bush, Bobby Manuel
- Recorded and mixed at Stax Studio A, Memphis TN

== Charts ==
=== Billboard charts ===
==== Album ====
Chart	Position
Billboard 200	1
Black Albums	1
Jazz Albums	1

==== Singles ====
Single	Chart	Position
"Theme from Shaft"	Billboard Hot 100	1
"Theme from Shaft"	Black Singles	2
"Theme from Shaft"	Adult Contemporary Singles	6

- "Do Your Thing" was also a Top 40 Pop Single

== Certifications ==
Region	Certification	Certified units/sales
United States (RIAA)	Gold	500,000^{^}
^{^} Shipments figures based on certification alone.

== Awards and nominations ==
Award	Category	Nominee(s)	Result	Ref.
Academy Awards	Best Original Dramatic Score	Isaac Hayes	Nominated	
Academy Awards	Best Song – Original for the Picture	"Theme from Shaft"; Music and Lyrics by Isaac Hayes	Won	
British Academy Film Awards	Best Original Music	Isaac Hayes	Nominated	
Golden Globe Awards	Best Original Score – Motion Picture	Isaac Hayes	Won	
Golden Globe Awards	Best Original Song – Motion Picture	"Theme from Shaft"; Music and Lyrics by Isaac Hayes	Nominated	
Grammy Awards	Album of the Year	Shaft – Isaac Hayes	Nominated	
Grammy Awards	Record of the Year	"Theme from Shaft" – Isaac Hayes	Nominated	
Grammy Awards	Best R&B Vocal Performance by a Group	"Theme from Shaft" (Instrumental) – Isaac Hayes	Nominated	
Grammy Awards	Best Instrumental Arrangement	"Theme from Shaft" – Isaac Hayes and Johnny Allen	Won	
Grammy Awards	Best Instrumental Composition	"Theme from Shaft" – Isaac Hayes	Nominated	
Grammy Awards	Best Original Score Written for a Motion Picture or a Television Special	Shaft – Isaac Hayes	Won	
Grammy Awards	Best Engineered Recording – Non-Classical	"Theme from Shaft" – Henry Bush, Ron Capone, and Dave Purple	Won	

== See also ==
- List of Billboard 200 number-one albums of 1971
- List of Billboard number-one R&B albums of 1971
