= The Isaac Hayes Movement =

Studio album by Isaac Hayes
- Released: April 1970
- Genre: Progressive soul
- Length: 36:18
- Label: Enterprise Records
- Producer: Isaac Hayes

Isaac Hayes chronology
Hot Buttered Soul (1969)	The Isaac Hayes Movement (1970)	...To Be Continued (1970)

Singles from The Isaac Hayes Movement
- 1. "I Stand Accused / I Just Don't Know What To Do With Myself" Released: August 1970

The Isaac Hayes Movement is the third studio album by the American soul musician Isaac Hayes. Released in 1970, it was the follow-up to Hot Buttered Soul, Hayes' landmark 1969 album. Marvell Thomas had come up with "The Isaac Hayes Movement" as a name for Hayes' backup ensemble. He modeled the name after the Jimi Hendrix Experience. Similar in structure to Hot Buttered Soul, The Isaac Hayes Movement features only four long tracks, all with meticulous, complex and heavily orchestrated arrangements. However, unlike the previous album, this time all four songs are reworked covers of others' material. This includes Jerry Butler's "I Stand Accused", which features a nearly five-minute long spoken intro that precedes the actual song, and The Beatles' "Something", which features violin soloing by John Blair. The other two songs included on the album were the Bacharach-David song "I Just Don't Know What to Do with Myself" and Chalmers and Rhodes' "One Big Unhappy Family".

Released in April 1970, The Isaac Hayes Movement spent a total of seven weeks at #1 on Billboard's Soul Albums chart and remained in the top ten until the last week of November in that year. The album also reached #1 on the Jazz Albums chart and spent 75 weeks on the Billboard 200 chart, peaking at #8. An edited version of "I Stand Accused" was released as a single in July 1970. It reached #23 on the Soul Singles chart and #42 on the Pop chart.

Stax Records reissued The Isaac Hayes Movement in SACD format in 2004.

Professional ratings
Review scores
Source	Rating
AllMusic	4.5/5 stars
Christgau's Record Guide	C
The Rolling Stone Album Guide	2.5/5 stars

== Track listing ==
Side one
No.	Title	Writer(s)	Length
1.	"I Stand Accused"	Jerry Butler, William Butler	11:39
2.	"One Big Unhappy Family"	Charles Chalmers, Sandra Rhodes	5:54

Side two
No.	Title	Writer(s)	Length
3.	"I Just Don't Know What to Do with Myself"	Burt Bacharach, Hal David	7:05
4.	"Something"	George Harrison	11:45

== Personnel ==
- Isaac Hayes – arrangements, keyboards, vocals, producer
- The Bar-Kays – rhythm section
- Dale Warren – arrangements
- Pat Lewis – vocal arrangements

Technical

- Joel Brodsky – photography
- Henry Bush – engineer
- Ron Capone – engineer, remixing, remix engineer
- George Horn – mastering
- Herb Kole – art supervisor
- David Krieger – art direction
- Joe Tarantino – mastering
- Ed Wolfrum – engineer

== Certifications ==
Region	Certification	Certified units/sales
United States (RIAA)	Gold	500,000^{^}
^{^} Shipments figures based on certification alone.

== See also ==
- List of number-one R&B albums of 1970 (U.S.)
