= Isaac Hayes =

American musician and actor (1942–2008)

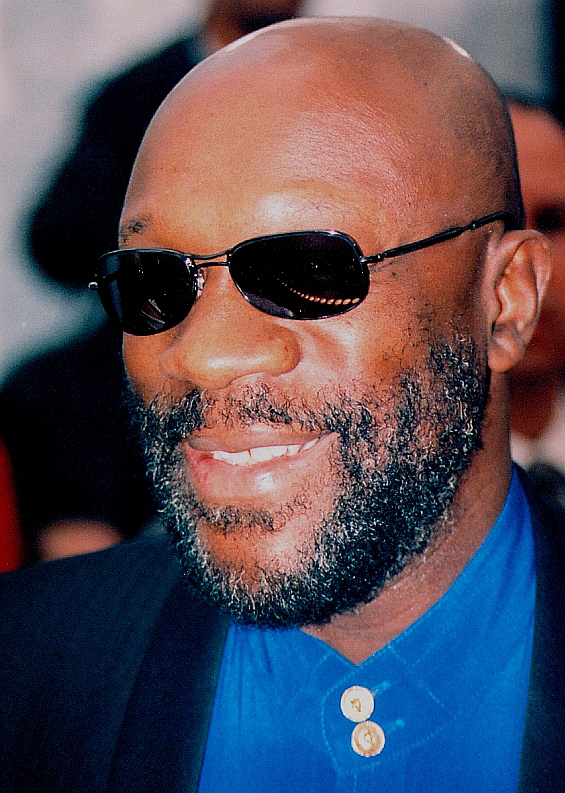
- Hayes in 1998
- Born: Isaac Lee Hayes Jr. August 20, 1942; Covington, Tennessee, U.S.
- Died: August 10, 2008 (aged 65); Memphis, Tennessee, U.S.
- Burial place: Memorial Park Cemetery
- Occupations: Singer; songwriter; record producer; actor; activist
- Years active: 1961–2008
- Spouses: Dancy Hayes (m. 1960, divorced) Emily Ruth Watson (m. 1965; div. 1972) Mignon Harley (m. 1973; div. 1986) Adjowa Hayes (m. 2005)
- Children: 11, including Isaac III
- Musical career
- Genres: Progressive soul; funk; psychedelic soul; disco
- Instruments: Vocals; keyboards; saxophone; percussion
- Labels: Enterprise; Stax; ABC; Polydor; PolyGram; Columbia; CBS; Pointblank; Virgin; EMI; HBS

Isaac Lee Hayes Jr. (August 20, 1942 – August 10, 2008) was an American singer, songwriter, composer, and actor. He was one of the creative forces behind the Southern soul music label Stax Records in the 1960s, serving as an in-house songwriter with his partner David Porter, as well as a session musician and record producer. Hayes and Porter were inducted into the Songwriters Hall of Fame in 2005 in recognition of writing scores of songs for themselves, the duo Sam & Dave, Carla Thomas, and others. In 2002, Hayes was inducted into the Rock and Roll Hall of Fame.

During the late 1960s, Hayes also began a career as a recording artist. He released several successful soul albums such as Hot Buttered Soul (1969) and Black Moses (1971). In addition to his work in popular music, Hayes worked as a film composer.

Hayes wrote the musical score for the film Shaft (1971). For the "Theme from Shaft", he was awarded the Academy Award for Best Original Song in 1972, making him the third black person, after Hattie McDaniel and Sidney Poitier, to win an Academy Award in any competitive field covered by the Academy of Motion Picture Arts and Sciences. Hayes also won two Grammy Awards that same year. Later, he won his third Grammy for his album Black Moses.

In 1992, Hayes was crowned honorary king of the Ada region of Ghana in recognition of his humanitarian work there. He acted in films and television, such as in the movies Truck Turner (1974), Escape from New York (1981) and I'm Gonna Git You Sucka (1988), and as Gandolf "Gandy" Fitch in the TV series The Rockford Files (1974–1980). Hayes also voiced the character Chef in the Comedy Central animated series South Park from its debut in 1997 until his controversial departure in 2006.

On August 5, 2003, Hayes was honored as a BMI Icon at the 2003 BMI Urban Awards for his enduring influence on generations of musicians. Throughout his songwriting career, Hayes received five BMI R&B Awards, two BMI Pop Awards, two BMI Urban Awards and six Million-Air citations.

== Early life ==
Isaac Lee Hayes Jr. was born on August 20, 1942, in Covington, Tennessee, the second child of Eula (née Wade) and Isaac Hayes Sr. After his mother died young and his father abandoned his family, Hayes was raised by his maternal grandparents, Mr. and Mrs. Willie Wade Sr. The child of a sharecropper family, Hayes grew up working on farms in the Tennessee counties of Shelby and Tipton. At age five, Hayes began singing at his local church and he taught himself to play the piano, Hammond organ, flute, and saxophone.

Hayes dropped out of high school, but his former teachers at Manassas High School in Memphis encouraged him to complete his diploma, which he did at the age of 21. After graduating from high school, Hayes was offered several music scholarships from colleges and universities. He turned down all of them to provide for his immediate family, working at a meat-packing plant in Memphis by day and playing nightclubs and juke joints several evenings a week in Memphis and nearby northern Mississippi. Hayes's first professional gigs, in the late 1950s, were as a singer at Curry's Club in North Memphis, backed by Ben Branch's houseband.

== Career ==
=== 1963–1974: Stax Records and Shaft ===
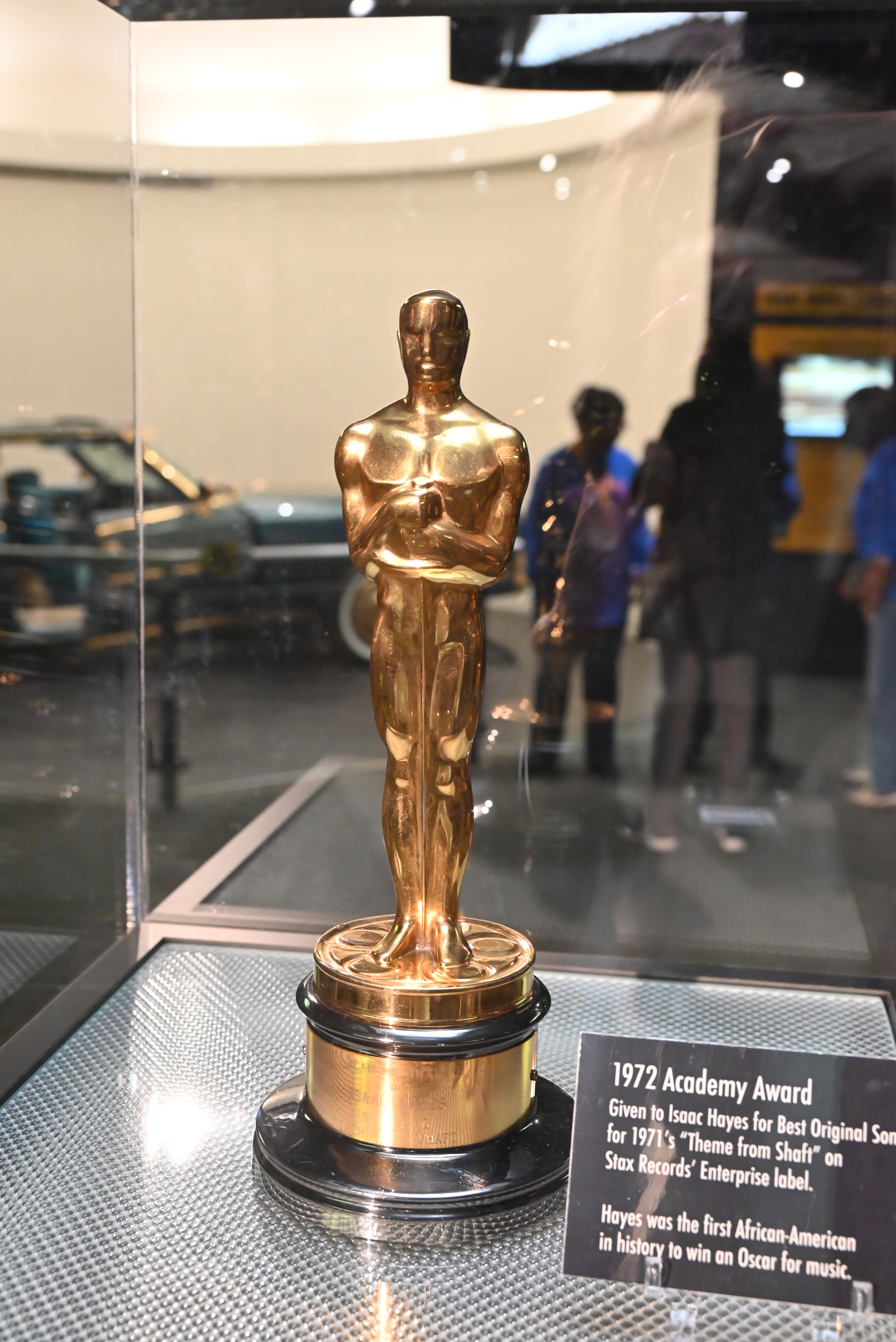
1972 Academy award for "Theme from Shaft"

Hayes began his recording career in the early 1960s, as a session musician for acts recorded by the Memphis-based Stax Records. He later wrote a string of hit songs with songwriting partner David Porter, including "You Don't Know Like I Know", "Soul Man", "When Something Is Wrong with My Baby" and "Hold On, I'm Comin'" for Sam & Dave. Hayes, Porter and Stax studio band Booker T. & the M.G.'s were also the producers for Sam & Dave, Carla Thomas and other Stax artists during the mid-1960s. One of the first Stax records Hayes played on was "Winter Snow" by Booker T. and The M.G.s (Stax 45–236), which indicates "Introducing Isaac Hayes on piano" on the label.

Hayes-Porter contributed to the Stax sound of this period, and Sam & Dave credited Hayes for helping develop both their sound and style. In 1968, Hayes released his debut album, Presenting Isaac Hayes, a jazzy, largely improvised effort that was commercially unsuccessful.

Stax then went through a major upheaval, losing its biggest star when Otis Redding died in a plane crash in December 1967, and then losing its back catalog to Atlantic Records in May 1968. As a result, Stax executive vice president Al Bell called for 27 new albums to be completed in mid-1969; Hayes's second album, Hot Buttered Soul was the most successful of these releases.

On Hot Buttered Soul, Hayes reinterpreted "Walk On By" (previously recorded by Dionne Warwick) into a 12-minute exploration. "By the Time I Get to Phoenix" starts with an eight-minute-long monologue before breaking into song, and the lone original number, the funky "Hyperbolicsyllabicsesquedalymistic" runs nearly ten minutes, a significant break from the standard three-minute soul/pop songs. "Walk On By" would be the first of many times Hayes would take a Burt Bacharach standard, generally known as three-minute pop songs by Dionne Warwick or Dusty Springfield, and transform it into a soulful, lengthy and almost gospel number.

In 1970, Hayes released two albums, The Isaac Hayes Movement and ...To Be Continued. The former stuck to the four-song template of his previous album. Jerry Butler's "I Stand Accused" begins with a trademark spoken word monologue, and Bacharach's "I Just Don't Know What to Do with Myself" is re-worked. The latter album included "The Look of Love", another Bacharach song transformed into an 11-minute epic of lush orchestral rhythm (mid-way it breaks into a rhythm guitar jam for a couple of minutes before suddenly resuming the slow love song). An edited three-minute version was issued as a single. The album featured the instrumental "Ike's Mood", which segues into a version of "You've Lost That Loving Feeling". Hayes released a Christmas single, "The Mistletoe and Me" (with "Winter Snow" as a B-side).

In early 1971, Hayes composed music for the soundtrack of the blaxploitation film Shaft (he appeared in a cameo role as a bartender). The title theme, with its wah-wah guitar and multi-layered symphonic arrangement, would become a worldwide hit single, and spent two weeks at number one in the Billboard Hot 100 in November. The remainder of the album was mostly instrumentals covering big beat jazz, bluesy funk, and hard Stax-styled soul. The other two vocal songs, the social commentary "Soulsville" and the 19-minute jam "Do Your Thing", would be edited down to hit singles. He won an "Academy Award for Best Original Song" for the "Theme from Shaft", and in addition was nominated for Best Original Dramatic Score. Later in the year, Hayes released a double album, Black Moses, that expanded on his earlier sounds and featured The Jackson 5's song "Never Can Say Goodbye". Another single, "I Can't Help It", was not featured on the album.

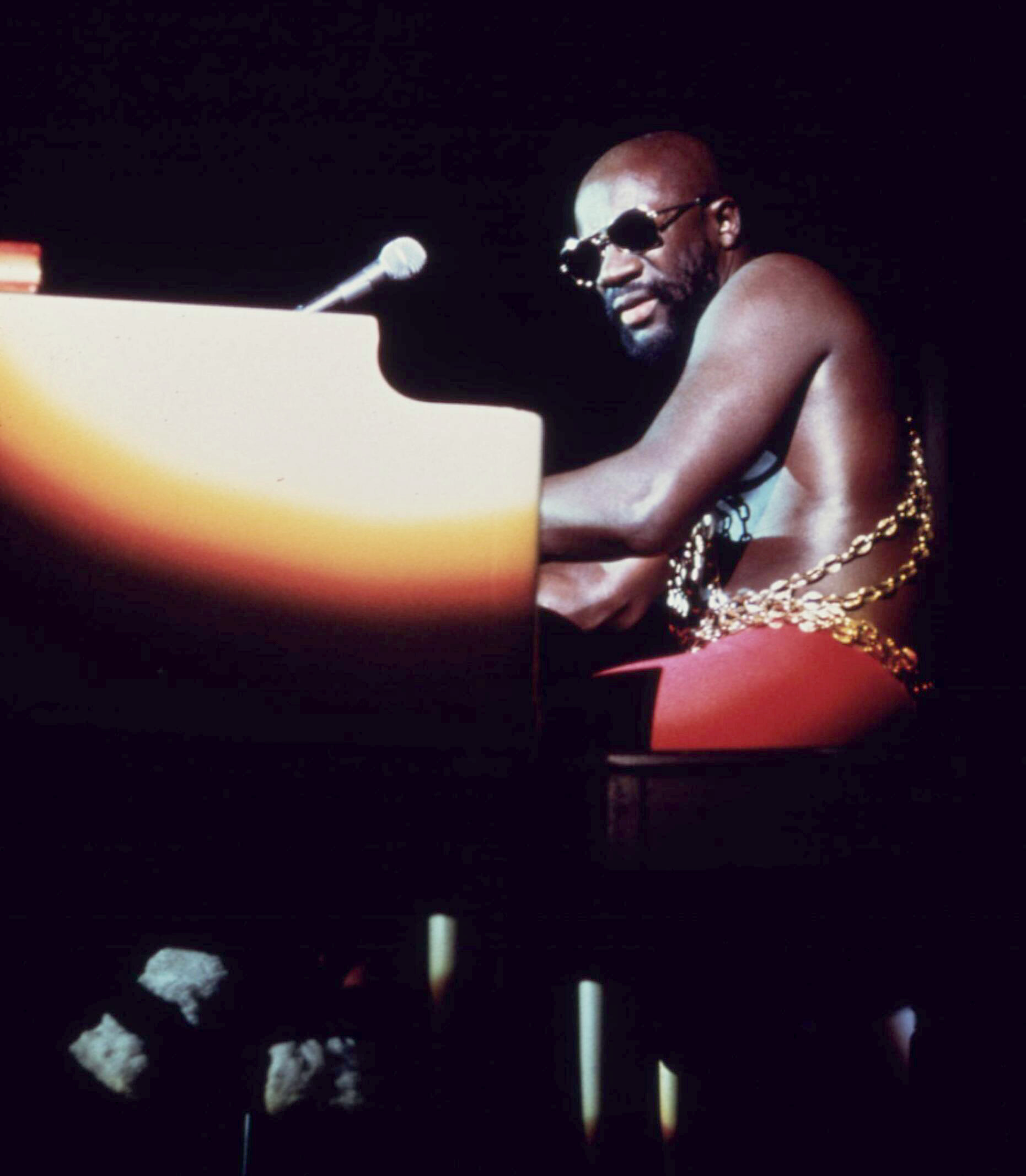
1973 photo of Hayes taken by John H. White

In 1972, Hayes would record the theme tune for the television series The Men and release a hit single (with "Type Thang" as a B-side). He released a couple of other non-album singles during the year, such as "If Loving You Is Wrong (I Don't Want to Be Right)" and "Rolling Down a Mountainside". Atlantic would re-release Hayes's debut album this year with the new title In The Beginning.

Hayes was back in 1973 with an acclaimed live double album, Live at the Sahara Tahoe, and followed it up with the album Joy. He moved away from cover songs with this album. An edited version of the title track would be a hit single.

In 1974, Hayes was featured in the blaxploitation films Three Tough Guys and Truck Turner, and he recorded soundtracks for both. Tough Guys was almost devoid of vocals and Truck Turner yielded a single with the title theme. The soundtrack score of Truck Turner was eventually used by filmmaker Quentin Tarantino in the Kill Bill film series, and has been used for over 30 years as the opening score of Brazilian radio show Jornal de Esportes on the Jovem Pan station.

Unlike most African American musicians of the period, Hayes did not sport an Afro haircut; his bald head became one of his defining characteristics.

=== 1974–1977: HBS, basketball team ownership, and bankruptcy ===
By 1974, Stax Records was having serious financial problems, stemming from problems with overextension and limited record sales and distribution. Hayes himself was deep in debt to Union Planters Bank, which administered loans for the Stax label and many of its other key employees. In September of that year, Hayes sued Stax for $5.3 million. As Stax was in deep debt and could not pay, the label made an arrangement with Hayes and Union Planters: Stax released Hayes from his recording and production contracts, and Union Planters would collect all of Hayes's income and apply it towards his debts.

Hayes formed his own label, Hot Buttered Soul, which released its product through ABC Records. His new album, 1975's Chocolate Chip, saw Hayes embrace the disco sound with the title track and lead single. "I Can't Turn Around" would prove a popular song as time went on. This would be Hayes's last album to chart in the top 40 for many years. Later in the year, the all-instrumental Disco Connection album fully embraced disco.

On July 17, 1974, Hayes, along with Mike Storen, Avron Fogelman, and Kemmons Wilson, took over ownership of the American Basketball Association team the Memphis Tams. The prior owner was Charles O. Finley, the owner of the Oakland A's baseball team. Hayes's group renamed the team the Memphis Sounds. Despite a 66% increase in home attendance, hiring well regarded coach Joe Mullaney and, unlike in the prior three seasons, making the 1975 ABA Playoffs (losing to the eventual champion Kentucky Colonels in the Eastern Division semi-finals), the team's financial problems continued. The group was given a deadline of June 1, 1975, to sell 4,000 season tickets, obtain new investors and arrange a more favorable lease for the team at the Mid-South Coliseum. However, the group did not come through and the ABA took over the team, selling it to a group in Maryland that renamed the team the Baltimore Hustlers and then the Baltimore Claws before the club finally folded during preseason play for the 1975–1976 season.

In 1976, the Groove-A-Thon album featured the single "Rock Me Easy Baby" and the title track. Later the same year, the album cover of Juicy Fruit (Disco Freak) featured Hayes in a pool with naked women, and spawned the title track single and the classic "The Storm Is Over". However, while all these albums were regarded as solid efforts, Hayes was no longer selling large numbers. He and his wife were forced into bankruptcy in 1976, as they owed over $6 million. By the end of the bankruptcy proceedings in 1977, Hayes had lost his home, much of his personal property, and the rights to all future royalties earned from the music he had written, performed, and produced.

=== 1977–1995: Polydor, hiatus, and film work ===
In 1977, Hayes was back with a new deal with Polydor Records, a live album of duets with Dionne Warwick did moderately well, and his comeback studio album New Horizon sold better and enjoyed a hit single "Out the Ghetto", and also featured the popular "It's Heaven to Me". 1978's For the Sake of Love saw Hayes record a sequel to "Theme from Shaft" ("Shaft II"), but was best known for the single "Zeke the Freak", a song that would have a shelf life of decades and be a major part of the House movement in the UK. The same year, Fantasy Records, which had bought out Stax Records, released an album of Hayes's non-album singles and archived recordings as a "new" album, Hotbed, in 1978. In 1979, Hayes returned to the Top 40 with Don't Let Go and its disco-styled title track that became a hit single (U.S. number 18), and also featured the classic "A Few More Kisses to Go". Later in the year he added vocals and worked on Millie Jackson's album Royal Rappin's, and a song he co-wrote, "Deja Vu", became a hit for Dionne Warwick and won her a Grammy for best female R&B vocal. Neither 1980s And Once Again or 1981's Lifetime Thing produced notable songs or big sales, and Hayes chose to take a break from music to pursue acting.

In the 1970s, Hayes was featured in the films Shaft (1971) and Truck Turner (1974); he also had a recurring role in the TV series The Rockford Files as an old cellmate of Rockford's, Gandolph Fitch (who always referred to Rockford as "Rockfish" much to his annoyance), including one episode alongside duet-partner Dionne Warwick. In the 1980s and 1990s, he appeared in numerous films, notably Escape from New York (1981), I'm Gonna Git You Sucka (1988), Prime Target (1991), and Robin Hood: Men in Tights (1993), as well as in episodes of The A-Team and Miami Vice. He also attempted a musical comeback, embracing the style of drum machines and synth for 1986s U-Turn and 1988s Love Attack, though neither proved successful. In 1991, he was featured in a duet with fellow soul singer Barry White on White's ballad "Dark and Lovely (You Over There)".

=== 1995–2006: Return to prominence and South Park ===
In 1995, Hayes appeared as a Las Vegas minister impersonating himself in the comedy series The Fresh Prince of Bel-Air. He launched a comeback on the Virgin label in May 1995 with Branded, an album of new material that earned impressive sales figures as well as positive reviews from critics who proclaimed it a return to form. A companion album released around the same time, Raw & Refined, featured a collection of previously unreleased instrumentals, both old and new. For the 1996 film Beavis and Butt-Head Do America, he wrote a version of the Beavis and Butt-Head theme in the style of the Shaft theme.

Hayes joined the founding cast of Comedy Central's animated TV series South Park. He provided the voice for the character of "Chef", the amorous elementary-school lunchroom cook, from the show's debut on August 13, 1997, through the end of its ninth season in 2006. The role of Chef combined his work both as an actor and as a singer, thanks to the character's penchant for making conversational points in the form of crudely suggestive soul songs. A song from the series performed by Chef, "Chocolate Salty Balls (P.S. I Love You)", received international radio airplay in 1999. It reached number one on the UK singles chart and also on the Irish singles chart. The track also appeared on the album Chef Aid: The South Park Album in 1998.

In 2000, Hayes appeared on the soundtrack of the French movie The Magnet on the song "Is It Really Home" written and composed by rapper Akhenaton (IAM) and composer Bruno Coulais. In 2002, Hayes was inducted into the Rock and Roll Hall of Fame. After he played a set at the 2002 Glastonbury Festival, a documentary highlighting Isaac's career and his impact on many of the Memphis artists in the 1960s onwards was produced, Only The Strong Survive. In 2004, Hayes appeared in a recurring minor role as the Jaffa Tolok on the television series Stargate SG-1. The following year, he appeared in the critically acclaimed independent film Hustle & Flow. He also had a brief recurring role in UPN/The CW's Girlfriends as Eugene Childs (father of Toni).

==== Departure from South Park ====
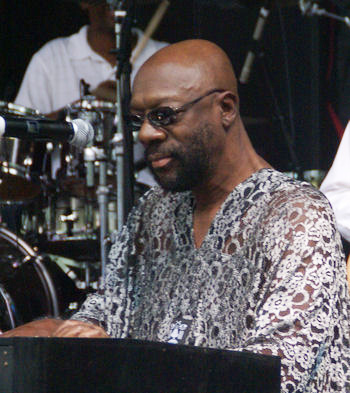
Hayes performing in 2007

In the South Park episode "Trapped in the Closet", a satire of Scientology that aired on November 16, 2005, Hayes did not appear in his role as Chef. In an interview for The A.V. Club, Hayes said that he was not pleased with the show's treatment of Scientology, but said that he "understands what Matt and Trey are doing".

On March 13, 2006, a statement was issued in Hayes's name, indicating that he was asking to be released from his contract with Comedy Central, calling recent episodes that satirized religious beliefs intolerant. "There is a place in this world for satire, but there is a time when satire ends and intolerance and bigotry towards religious beliefs of others begins", he was quoted as saying in the press-statement. However, the statement did not directly mention Scientology. A response from Stone said that Hayes's complaints stemmed from the show's criticism of Scientology and that he "has no problem—and he's cashed plenty of checks—with our show making fun of Christians, Muslims, Mormons, or Jews."

On March 20, 2006, two days before the episode "The Return of Chef" aired, Roger Friedman of Fox News reported having been told that the March 13 statement was made in Hayes's name, but not by Hayes himself. He wrote: "Isaac Hayes did not quit South Park. My sources say that someone quit it for him. ... Friends in Memphis tell me that Hayes did not issue any statements on his own about South Park. They are mystified." In a 2016 oral history of South Park in The Hollywood Reporter, Hayes's son Isaac Hayes III said the decision to leave the show was made by his father's entourage, all of whom were ardent Scientologists, and that it was made after Hayes suffered a stroke, leaving him vulnerable to outside influence and unable to make such decisions on his own. Despite later alleging that he supported the belief that Hayes' departure from South Park was conjured up by members of the Church of Scientology, with his agent Christina Kimball supposedly writing the statement regarding his departure, Matt Stone had previously conceded in March 2006 that the South Park's decision to take aim at Scientology was indeed connected to his personal decision to depart from the show, "This is 100 percent having to do with his faith of Scientology. ... He has no problem ... with our show making fun of Christians." Trey Parker "never heard a peep out of Isaac in any way until we did Scientology. He wants a different standard for religions other than his own, and to me, that is where intolerance and bigotry begin."

=== 2006–2008: Final years ===
Hayes's income was sharply reduced as a result of leaving South Park. There followed announcements that he would be touring and performing. A Fox News reporter present at a January 2007 show in New York City, who had known Hayes fairly well, reported that "Isaac was plunked down at a keyboard, where he pretended to front his band. He spoke-sang, and his words were halting. He was not the Isaac Hayes of the past."

In April 2008, while a guest on The Adam Carolla Show, Hayes stumbled in his responses to questions, possibly as a result of health problems. A caller questioned whether Hayes was under the influence of a substance, and Carolla and co-host Teresa Strasser asked Hayes if he had ever used marijuana. After some confusion on what was being asked, Hayes replied that he had only ever tried it once. During the interview the radio hosts made light of Hayes's awkward answers, and replayed snippets of earlier ones to simulate conversation with his co-hosts. Hayes stated during this interview that he was no longer on good terms with Parker and Stone.

During the spring of 2008, Hayes shot scenes for Soul Men, a comedy inspired by the history of Stax Records, in which he appears as himself in a supporting role. The film was released in November 2008, after both Hayes and his costar, Bernie Mac, had died.

== Health problems and death ==
On March 20, 2006, Roger Friedman of Fox News reported that Hayes had suffered a minor stroke in January. Hayes's spokeswoman, Amy Harnell, denied this, but on October 26, 2006, Hayes confirmed he had suffered a stroke.

On August 10, 2008, Hayes was found unresponsive in his home, just east of Memphis, as reported by the Shelby County, Tennessee Sheriff's Office. A Shelby County Sheriff's deputy and an ambulance from Rural Metro responded to his home after three family members found his body on the floor next to a still-operating treadmill. Hayes was taken to Baptist Memorial Hospital in Memphis, where he was pronounced dead at 2:08 p.m, ten days from what would have been his 66th birthday. The cause of death was not immediately clear, although the area medical examiners later listed a recurrence of stroke as the cause of death. A private funeral was held with actors Tom Cruise and Denzel Washington in attendance. Hayes was buried at Memorial Park Cemetery, in Memphis, Tennessee.

=== Legacy ===
The Tennessee General Assembly enacted legislation in 2010 to honor Hayes by naming a section of Interstate 40 the "Isaac Hayes Memorial Highway". The name was applied to the stretch of highway in Shelby County from Sam Cooper Boulevard in Memphis east to the Fayette County line. The naming was made official at a ceremony held on Hayes's birthday in August 2010.

== Personal life ==
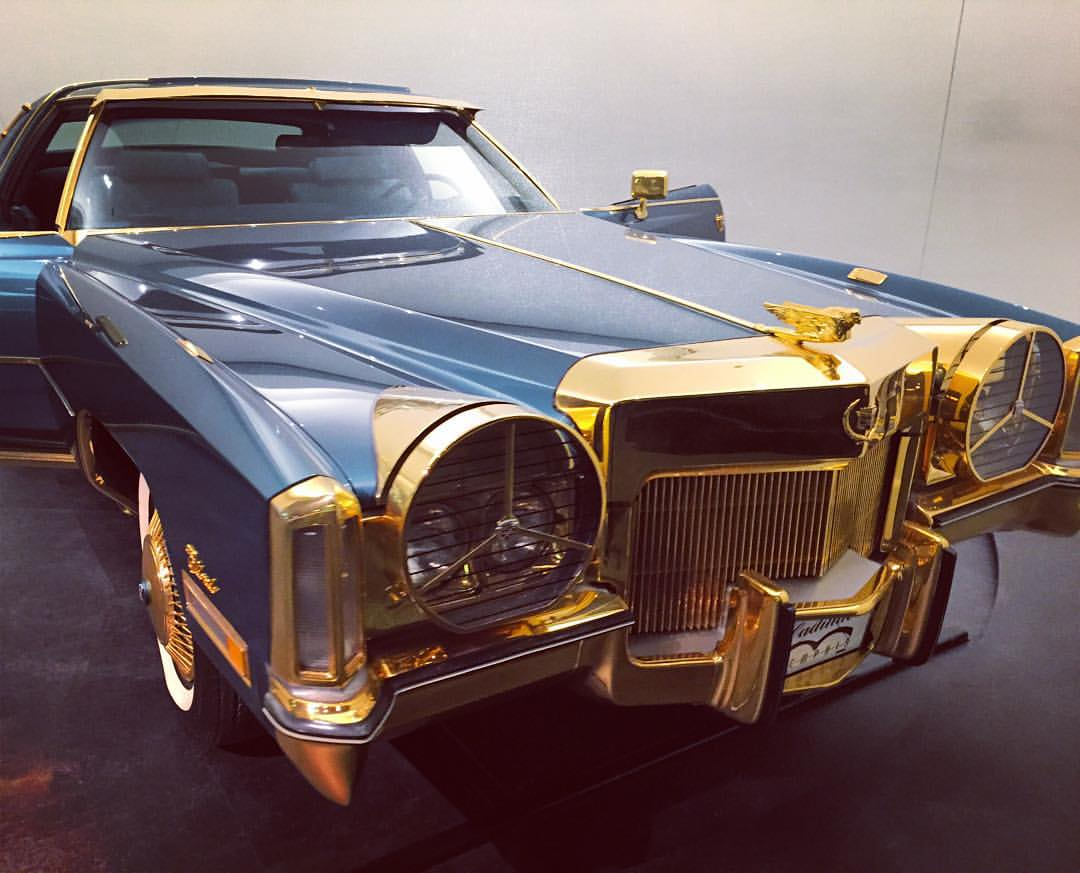
Hayes's Cadillac at the Stax Museum of American Soul Music in Memphis, Tennessee

=== Family ===
Hayes had 11 children, 14 grandchildren, and three great-grandchildren. His first marriage was to Dancy Hayes in 1960 and ended in divorce. His second marriage was to Emily Ruth Watson on November 24, 1965, and they divorced in 1972. Children from this marriage included Vincent Eric Hayes, Melanie Mia Hayes, and Nicole A. Hayes (Murrell). He married bank teller Mignon Harley on April 18, 1973, and they divorced in 1986; they had two children. Hayes and his wife were eventually forced into bankruptcy, owing over $6 million. Over the years, Isaac Hayes was able to recover financially.

Hayes's fourth wife, Adjowa, gave birth to a son named Nana Kwadjo Hayes on April 10, 2006. He also had one son to whom he gave his name, Isaac Hayes III, known as rap producer Ike Dirty. Hayes's eldest daughter is named Jackie, also named co-executor of his estate, and other children include Veronica, Felicia, Melanie, Nikki, Lili, Darius, Vincent and Heather.

=== Scientology ===
Hayes took his first Scientology course in 1993, later contributing endorsement blurbs for many Scientology books over the ensuing years. In 1996, Hayes began hosting The Isaac Hayes and Friends Radio Show on WRKS in New York City. While there, Hayes became a client of the vegan raw food chef Elijah Joy and his company Organic Soul Inc. Hayes also appears in the 1996 Scientology film Orientation. In 1997, he and Lisa Marie Presley opened a Church of Scientology mission in Memphis. In 1998, Hayes and fellow Scientologist entertainers Anne Archer, Chick Corea and Haywood Nelson attended the 30th anniversary of Freedom Magazine, the Church of Scientology's self-described investigative news journal, at the National Press Club in Washington, D.C., to honor eleven activists. In 2001, Hayes and Doug E. Fresh, another Scientologist musician, recorded a Scientology-inspired album called The Joy of Creating – The Golden Era Musicians and Friends Play L. Ron Hubbard. In February 2006, Hayes appeared in a music video called "United" for Youth for Human Rights International, a human rights group founded by the Church of Scientology-backed non-profit United for Human Rights.

=== Charitable work ===
The Isaac Hayes Foundation was founded in 1999 by Hayes. He was also involved in other human rights related groups such as the One Campaign. Isaac Hayes was crowned a chief in Ghana for his humanitarian work and economic efforts on the country's behalf.

== Discography ==
- Presenting Isaac Hayes (1968)
- Hot Buttered Soul (1969)
- The Isaac Hayes Movement (1970)
- ...To Be Continued (1970)
- Shaft (1971)
- Black Moses (1971)
- Live at the Sahara Tahoe (1973)
- Joy (1973)
- Tough Guys (1974)
- Chocolate Chip (1975)
- Disco Connection (1975)
- Groove-A-Thon (1976)
- Juicy Fruit (Disco Freak) (1976)
- New Horizon (1977)
- Hotbed (1978)
- For the Sake of Love (1978)
- Don't Let Go (1979)
- Royal Rappin's (1979) (with Millie Jackson)
- And Once Again (1980)
- Lifetime Thing (1981)
- U-Turn (1986)
- Love Attack (1988)
- Raw & Refined (1995)
- Branded (1995)

== Collaborations ==
=== With Otis Redding ===
- Otis Blue: Otis Redding Sings Soul (Volt, 1965)
- The Soul Album (Volt, 1966)
- Complete & Unbelievable: The Otis Redding Dictionary of Soul (Volt, 1966)
- King & Queen (Stax, 1967)
- The Dock of the Bay (Volt, 1968)

=== With Wilson Pickett ===
- The Exciting Wilson Pickett (Atlantic, 1966)

=== With Donald Byrd and 125th Street, N.Y.C. ===
- Love Byrd (Elektra, 1981)
- Words, Sounds, Colors and Shapes (Elektra, 1982)

=== With Linda Clifford ===
- I'm Yours (Curtom/RSO, 1980)

=== With Albert King ===
- Born Under a Bad Sign (Stax, 1967)

=== With William Bell ===
- The Soul of a Bell (Stax, 1967)

=== With Dionne Warwick ===
- No Night So Long (Arista, 1980)

=== With Rufus Thomas ===
- Do The Funky Chicken (Stax, 1970)

=== With Eddie Floyd ===
- Knock on Wood (Stax, 1967)

== Filmography ==
=== Films ===
Year	Title	Role	Notes
1971	Shaft	Bartender	
1973	Wattstax	Himself	
1973	Save the Children	Himself	
1974	Three Tough Guys	Lee	
1974	Truck Turner	Mac "Truck" Turner	
1976	It Seemed Like a Good Idea at the Time	Moriarty	
1981	Escape from New York	The Duke	
1988	I'm Gonna Git You Sucka	Hammer	
1990	Fire, Ice and Dynamite	Hitek Leader/Himself	Alternative title: Feuer, Eis und Dynamit
1991	Guilty as Charged	Aloysius	
1993	CB4	Owner	
1993	Posse	Cable	
1993	Robin Hood: Men in Tights	Asneeze	
1993	Acting on Impulse	Cameo role	
1994	It Could Happen to You	Angel Dupree	
1996	Flipper	Sheriff Buck Cowan	
1997	Uncle Sam	Jed Crowley	
1998	Blues Brothers 2000	Member of The Louisiana Gator Boys	
1999	South Park: Bigger, Longer & Uncut	Chef (voice)	
2000	Reindeer Games	Zook	
2000	Shaft	Mr. P	Uncredited
2001	Dr. Dolittle 2	Possum (voice)	
2003	Dream Warrior	Zo	
2004	Anonymous Rex	Elegant Man	
2005	Hustle & Flow	Arnel	
2008	Kill Switch	Coroner	Released posthumously
2008	Return to Sleepaway Camp	"The Chef"	Filmed in 2003, Released posthumously
2008	Soul Men	Himself	Released posthumously

=== Television ===
Year	Title	Role	Notes
1972	Rowan & Martin's Laugh-In	Self	Episode: "John Wayne"
1976–1977	The Rockford Files	Gandolph Fitch	3 episodes
1985	The A-Team	C.J. Mack	Episode: "The Heart of Rock N' Roll"
1986	Hunter	Jerome "Typhoon" Thompson	Episode: "The Return of Typhoon Thompson"
1987	Miami Vice	Holiday	Episode: "Child's Play"
1993	American Playhouse	Prophet	Episode: "Hallelujah"
1994	Tales from the Crypt	Samuel	Episode: "Revenge is the Nuts"
1995	The Fresh Prince of Bel-Air	Minister Hayes	Episode: "The Wedding Show (Psyche!)"
1995	Soul Survivors	Vernon Holland	TV film
1996	The Dana Carvey Show	Kim	1 episode (uncredited)
1996	Sliders	The Prime Oracle	Episode: "Obsession"
1997–2006	South Park	Chef (voice)	Seasons 1–10
1999	Veronica's Closet	Himself	Episode: "Veronica's New Year"
1999	The Hughleys	The Man	2 episodes
2002	The Education of Max Bickford	"Night Train" Raymond	Episode: "Save the Country"
2002	Fastlane	Detective Marcus	Pilot
2003	Book of Days	Jonah	TV film
2003	Girlfriends	Eugene Childs	2 episodes
2005–2006	Stargate SG-1	Tolok/Teal'c PI Announcer	4 episodes
2005	The Bernie Mac Show	Himself	Episode: "The Music Mac"
2006	That '70s Show	Himself	Episode: "Spread Your Wings"

=== Video games ===
Year	Title	Role	Notes
1998	South Park	Chef	
1999	South Park: Chef's Luv Shack	Chef	
2000	South Park Rally	Chef	
2014	South Park: The Stick of Truth	Chef	Archival Recordings

=== Music video guest appearances ===
Year	Title	Artist
1995	"Temptations"	Tupac Shakur

== Awards and nominations ==
Year	Award	Category	Nominated work	Result	Ref.
1971	Academy Awards	Best Original Dramatic Score	Shaft	Nominated	
1971	Academy Awards	Best Song – Original for the Picture	"Theme from Shaft" (from Shaft)	Won	
1978	American Music Awards	Favorite Disco Male Artist		Won	
1997	BMI Film & TV Awards	BMI TV Music Award	Soul Man (shared with David Porter)	Won	
1971	British Academy Film Awards	Anthony Asquith Memorial Award	Shaft	Nominated	
1971	Golden Globe Awards	Best Original Score – Motion Picture	Shaft	Won	
1971	Golden Globe Awards	Best Original Song – Motion Picture	"Theme from Shaft" (from Shaft)	Nominated	
1968	Grammy Awards	Best Rhythm & Blues Recording	"Soul Man" (shared with Sam & Dave)	Nominated	
1972	Grammy Awards	Album of the Year	Shaft	Nominated	
1972	Grammy Awards	Record of the Year	"Theme from Shaft"	Nominated	
1972	Grammy Awards	Best R&B Vocal Performance, Male	"Never Can Say Goodbye"	Nominated	
1972	Grammy Awards	Best R&B Vocal Performance by a Group	"Theme from Shaft" (Instrumental)	Nominated	
1972	Grammy Awards	Best Instrumental Arrangement	"Theme from Shaft" (shared with Johnny Allen)	Won	
1972	Grammy Awards	Best Instrumental Composition	"Theme from Shaft"	Nominated	
1972	Grammy Awards	Best Original Score Written for a Motion Picture or a Television Special	Shaft	Won	
1973	Grammy Awards	Best Pop Instrumental Performance by an Arranger, Composer, Orchestra and/or Choral Leader	Black Moses	Won	
1973	Grammy Awards	Best R&B Instrumental Performance	"Let's Stay Together"	Nominated	
1976	Grammy Awards	Best R&B Vocal Performance, Male	"Chocolate Chip"	Nominated	
1980	Grammy Awards	Best R&B Vocal Performance, Male	"Don't Let Go"	Nominated	
1980	Grammy Awards	Best Rhythm & Blues Song	"Déjà Vu" (shared with Adrienne Anderson)	Nominated	
1998	NAACP Image Awards	Outstanding Lead Actor in a Comedy Series	South Park	Nominated	
2021	Online Film & Television Association Awards	Film Hall of Fame: Scores	Shaft (shared with J. J. Johnson)	Inducted	
2005	Screen Actors Guild Awards	Outstanding Performance by a Cast in a Motion Picture	Hustle & Flow (shared with the cast)	Nominated	

== Bibliography ==
- Bowman, Rob (1997). Soulsville U.S.A.: The Story of Stax Records. New York: Schirmer Trade. ISBN 978-0-8256-7284-2. OCLC 36824884. Google Books.
