= No Frills Friend =

Studio album by Amy Allison
- Released: July 1, 2003
- Recorded: Scotland
- Genre: Alternative country
- Length: 38:51
- Label: Diesel Only
- Producer: David Scott

Amy Allison chronology
Sad Girl (2001)	No Frills Friend (2003)	Everything and Nothing Too (2006)

No Frills Friend is Amy Allison's third solo album. It was released on July 1, 2003 on Diesel Only Records. It was recorded in Scotland and produced by David Scott of the Pearlfishers.

== Critical reception ==
Professional ratings
Review scores
Source	Rating
AllMusic	4/5 stars
CMJ	(favorable)
Drowned in Sound	(8/10)
No Depression	(favorable)
Robert Christgau	(A−)
Chicago Tribune	(favorable)

No Frills Friend was described by Mark Keresman of SF Weekly as "a gem of despondent, shimmering pop/folk/rock balladry". Keresman also wrote that it "retains her distinctively mournful, somewhat nasal warble and her gift for simple yet sturdy melodies" found on her previous albums. Neil Jones of Drowned in Sound described No Frills Friend as "a vocally driven record dripping with melodic richness."

== Track listing ==
1. What's the Deal?
2. No Frills Friend
3. Baby, You're the One
4. Hell to Pay
5. Pretty Things to Buy
6. Don't String Me Along
7. Say It Isn't So
8. Dreaming's Killing Me
9. Thank God for the Wine
10. Beautiful Night
11. Completely Yours
12. Hanging on a Moment
13. Moonlight on the Mountains

== Personnel ==
- Amy Allison—Composer, Guitar (Acoustic), Primary Artist, Vocals
- Gina R. Binkley—Design
- Avy Carroli—Sleigh Bells
- Jim Gash—Drums, Percussion
- Paul McGeechan—Mastering
- David Scott—Bass, Engineer, Guitar, Keyboards, Primary Artist, Producer, Vocals
- Derek Star—Percussion
