= No Way There from Here =

Studio album by Laura Cantrell
- Released: January 28, 2014
- Genre: Americana, country
- Length: 38:10
- Label: Thrift Shop Recordings

Laura Cantrell chronology
| Kitty Wells Dresses: Songs of the Queen of Country Music (2011) | No Way There from Here (2014) |

No Way There from Here is an album by American country musician Laura Cantrell, released on January 28, 2014, by Thrift Shop Recordings. It is her first album of original material in nine years, since Humming by the Flowered Vine was released in 2005.

== Critical reception ==
Professional ratings
Aggregate scores
| Source | Rating |
|---|---|
| Metacritic | 82/100 |
Review scores
| Source | Rating |
| AllMusic | 4/5 stars |
| American Songwriter | 4/5 stars |
| Blurt | 5/5 stars |
| Cuepoint (Expert Witness) | A− |
| Exclaim! | 8/10 |
| PopMatters | 9/10 |
| Rolling Stone | 3/5 stars |
| Tom Hull | A− |
| Uncut | 8/10 |

According to Metacritic, No Way There from Here has a score of 82, based on 8 critic reviews, indicating "universal acclaim". Among the critics who reviewed the album favorably was Ann Powers of NPR, who described the twelve songs on the album as "deceptively lovely". Powers also wrote that on the album, Cantrell "...finds the most telling private moments in the days and nights of her characters and lays them out simply, with love." Robert Christgau gave the album an A− grade, writing that "two [of Cantrell's] cowrites [on the album] with the darker and sharper Amy Allison are intensely flavorful: the pan-feminist "All the Girls Are Complicated" and the pining-for-my-guy "Can't Wait.""

== Track listing ==
| No. | Title | Writer(s) | Length |
|---|---|---|---|
| 1. | "All the Girls Are Complicated" | Amy Allison; Laura Cantrell | 3:03 |
| 2. | "Starry Skies" | Cantrell | 3:29 |
| 3. | "Letter She Sent" | Cantrell | 3:04 |
| 4. | "No Way There from Here" | Franklin Bruno; Cantrell | 4:37 |
| 5. | "Glass Armour" | Cantrell; Tracyanne Campbell | 3:06 |
| 6. | "Beg or Borrow Days" | Jennifer Connor | 2:49 |
| 7. | "Driving Down Your Street" | Cantrell | 2:21 |
| 8. | "When It Comes to You" | Cantrell; Sam Bisbee | 2:38 |
| 9. | "Can't Wait" | Amy Allison; Cantrell | 3:13 |
| 10. | "Barely Said a Thing" | Cantrell | 2:41 |
| 11. | "Washday Blues" | Cantrell | 3:33 |
| 12. | "Someday Sparrow" | Franklin Bruno; Cantrell | 3:44 |
| Total length: | | | 38:10 |
