= Everybody Ought to Know =

Everybody Ought to Know may refer to:

- "Everybody Ought to Know", a Christian folk song about who Jesus is
- "Everybody Ought to Know", a song by Stephanie Mills from Personal Inspirations, 1994
- "Everybody Ought to Know", a song by London Parris
- "Everybody Ought to Know", a song by Take 6 from So Cool, 1998
- "Everybody Ought to Know", a song by Amy Allison recorded with the Maudlins from The Maudlin Years, 1996
- "Everybody Ought to Know", a song by Wolfie from Awful Mess Mystery, 1999
