= Trains and Boats and Planes (EP) =

EP by Laura Cantrell
- Released: April 15, 2008
- Recorded: 2007
- Studio: The Tape Kitchen, Brooklyn
- Genre: Country music
- Length: 34:30
- Label: Diesel Only
- Producer: Laura Cantrell, Mark Spencer

Laura Cantrell chronology
Humming by the Flowered Vine (2005)	Trains and Boats and Planes (2008)	Kitty Wells Dresses: Songs of the Queen of Country Music (2011)

Trains and Boats and Planes is an EP released on Diesel Only Records by Laura Cantrell on April 15, 2008. It is a concept EP centered on the theme of traveling, as exemplified by the title track (a cover of the song of the same name by Burt Bacharach and Hal David). In total, six songs (out of nine) on this EP are covers, including the title track.

Professional ratings
Review scores
Source	Rating
Blurt	(mixed)
PopMatters	8/10 stars
Prefix	7.5/10 stars
Robert Christgau	(choice cut)

== Track listing ==
1. "Trains and Boats and Planes" (Burt Bacharach, Hal David) – 4:14
2. "Train of Life" (Robert S. Riley, Roger Miller) – 2:49
3. "The Wreck of the Edmund Fitzgerald" (Gordon Lightfoot) – 6:25
4. "Howard Hughes Blues" (John Hartford) – 3:37
5. "Love Vigilantes" (Bernard Sumner, Gillian Gilbert, Peter Hook, Stephen Morris) – 4:18
6. "Silver Wings" – 4:22
7. "Roll Truck Roll" (Roy Pennington) – 2:38
8. "Big Wheel" (Laura Cantrell) – 2:30
9. "Yonder Comes a Freight Train" (Jay Sherman-Godfrey, Jeremy Tepper) – 3:21
