= The Songs of Bacharach & Costello =

Compilation album by Burt Bacharach and Elvis Costello
- Released: March 3, 2023
- Recorded: 1995–2022, intermittently
- Genre: Baroque pop; orchestral pop
- Length: 179:50
- Language: English
- Label: UMe
- Producer: Burt Bacharach; Elvis Costello

Burt Bacharach and Elvis Costello chronology
Painted from Memory (1998)	The Songs of Bacharach & Costello (2023)

Burt Bacharach chronology
At This Time (2005)	The Songs of Bacharach & Costello (2023)

Elvis Costello chronology
The Resurrection of Rust (2022)	The Songs of Bacharach & Costello (2023)	The Coward Brothers (2024)

The Songs of Bacharach & Costello is a box set of recordings from American pop musician Burt Bacharach and British rock musician Elvis Costello, released in 2023. Recorded in the 1990s, it also includes miscellaneous recordings of the duo's compositions by other artists and a few new tracks. Costello called the compilation "a love letter to Burt".

== Critical reception ==
Professional ratings
Aggregate scores
Source	Rating
Metacritic	87 (7 reviews)
Review scores
Source	Rating
AllMusic	4/5 stars
Clash Music	8/10
Mojo	4/5 stars
Paste	8.0/10
Pitchfork	8.4/10
Uncut	4.5/5 stars

The Songs of Bacharach & Costello received positive reviews from critics noted at review aggregator Metacritic. It has a weighted average score of 87 out of 100, based on seven reviews.

Editors at AllMusic rated this album 4 out of 5 stars, with critic Mark Deming writing that while "this collection wasn't intended to be a memorial" being released weeks after Bacharach's death, "the deep dive into one of his last major collaborations pays worthy homage to his skill and dedication to craft, and every moment testifies to Costello's towering respect for the great man". Lee Zimmerman of American Songwriter characterizes this as "a sumptuous box set and one that's mined with obvious depth and devotion". Emma Harrison of Clash Music rated this an 8 out of 10, calling it "a thoughtful and sensitively crafted project showcasing an awe-inspiring collection of carefully-crafted tracks" as well as "a touching tribute" to Bacharach. Writing for Louder Than War, Angela Joenck Watt called this compilation "a stunning tribute to the partnership between two of popular music's greatest songwriters". In Mojo, John Aizlewood rated this compilation 4 out of 5 stars, praising the Taken from Life disc in particular and summing up that it is "a treasure trove within a set that defines how well collaborations can work". musicOMH's Ian Wade wrote an overview of compilations and reissues released at the time, and called The Songs of Bacharach & Costello an "exhaustive and gorgeous release" that is "beautiful".

Saby Reyes-Kulkarni of Paste gave the box set an 8.0 out of 10, highlighting Costello's "wit and humor" and writing that the bonus material as well as the remaster of Painted from Memory justify this release, which she calls "a historic pairing of musical minds". Editors at Pitchfork chose this as Best New Reissue of the week and critic Stephen M. Deusner rated it an 8.4 out of 10, for showing "just how durable these songs are, precisely because they're so malleable, so open to whatever Costello or Wilson or you might bring to them" and calling it "a heartfelt eulogy" for Bacharach. In Uncut Deusner gave a second review, with this album getting 4.5 out of 5 stars, writing that the Taken from Life collection "offer[s] a fascinating new perspective on the collaboration". Marc Myers of The Wall Street Journal writes that Bacharach's death makes "the new box take on fresh import" and speculates that this music "may turn out to be both artists' most significant and heartfelt work".

Stuart Monroe of The Boston Globe listed this among the nine best album reissues of 2023.

== Track listing ==
All songs written by Burt Bacharach and Elvis Costello, except where noted.

Disc one: Painted from Memory (2023 remaster) by Bacharach and Costello

1. "In the Darkest Place" – 4:20
2. "Toledo" – 4:33
3. "I Still Have That Other Girl" – 2:48
4. "This House Is Empty Now" – 5:09
5. "Tears at the Birthday Party" – 4:39
6. "Such Unlikely Lovers" – 3:27
7. "My Thief" – 4:18
8. "The Long Division" – 4:12
9. "Painted from Memory" – 4:12
10. "The Sweetest Punch" – 4:09
11. "What's Her Name Today?" – 4:07
12. "God Give Me Strength" – 6:10

Some editions include the first track from disc two as the 13th track of disc one.

Disc two: Taken from Life, compositions by Bacharach and Costello recorded by various artists

1. "You Can Have Her" by Elvis Costello – 5:08
2. "Painted from Memory" by Bill Frisell and Cassandra Wilson – 4:11
3. "Don't Look Now" by Burt Bacharach and Elvis Costello & The Imposters – 2:31
4. "Everyone's Playing House" by Elvis Costello & The Imposters – 3:06
5. "I Looked Away" by Audra Mae – 2:38
6. "Taken from Life" by Elvis Costello & The Imposters – 4:21
7. "My Thief" by Don Byron by Bill Frisell – 4:32
8. "Shameless" by Jenni Muldaur – 4:32
9. "Photographs Can Lie" by Burt Bacharach and Elvis Costello & The Imposters – 3:40
10. "In the Darkest Place" by Audra Mae – 3:30
11. "Why Won't Heaven Help Me?" by Elvis Costello & The Imposters – 3:23
12. "Stripping Paper" by Jenni Muldaur – 3:36
13. "He's Given Me Things" by Elvis Costello & The Imposters – 4:13
14. "What's Her Name Today?" by Audra Mae – 3:45
15. "Look Up Again" by Elvis Costello – 5:18
16. "Lie Back & Think of England" by Burt Bacharach – 2:08

Disc three: Because It's a Lonely World – Live, live recordings by Elvis Costello

1. "Toledo" by Elvis Costello and Steve Nieve (live in Tokyo, Japan, Nakano Sunplaza Hall, February 8, 1999) – 5:05
2. "In the Darkest Place" by Elvis Costello and Steve Nieve (live in Melbourne, Australia, Athenaeum Theatre, February 16, 1999) – 4:43
3. "My Thief" by Elvis Costello and Steve Nieve (live in Tokyo, Japan, Nakano Sunplaza Hall, February 8, 1999) – 5:20
4. "I Still Have That Other Girl" by Elvis Costello and Steve Nieve (live in Tokyo, Japan, Shibuya Hall, February 10, 1999) – 3:16
5. "I'll Never Fall in Love Again" (Bacharach and Hal David) by Elvis Costello and Steve Nieve (live in Toronto, Ontario, Massey Hall, June 16, 1999) – 3:42
6. "God Give Me Strength" by Elvis Costello and Steve Nieve (live in Toronto, Ontario, Massey Hall, June 16, 1999) – 5:08
7. "Painted from Memory" by Elvis Costello, Steve Nieve, and the Swedish Radio Symphony Orchestra (live in Stockholm, Sweden, Berwaldhallen, January 5, 1999) – 4:12
8. "What's Her Name Today?" by Elvis Costello, Steve Nieve, and the Swedish Radio Symphony Orchestra (live in Stockholm, Sweden, Berwaldhallen, January 5, 1999) – 4:29
9. "This House Is Empty Now" by Burt Bacharach and Elvis Costello (live in New York City, Late Night with Conan O'Brien, November 27, 1998) – 4:13

Disc four: Costello Sings Bacharach / David, Costello performing songs by Bacharach and Hal David

1. "I Just Don't Know What to Do with Myself" by Elvis Costello & The Attractions (live at University of East Anglia, Norwich, United Kingdom, October 17, 1977) – 2:18
2. "Baby It's You" by Elvis Costello and Nick Lowe – 3:16
3. "Please Stay" by Elvis Costello – 4:51
4. "I'll Never Fall in Love Again" by Burt Bacharach and Elvis Costello (live in Toronto, Ontario at Massey Hall, June 16, 1999) – 3:21
5. "Make It Easy on Yourself" by Burt Bacharach and Elvis Costello (live in London at Royal Festival Hall, October 29, 1998) – 3:19
6. "My Little Red Book" by Burt Bacharach and Elvis Costello (live in London at Royal Festival Hall, October 29, 1998) – 2:49
7. "Anyone Who Had a Heart" by Burt Bacharach and Elvis Costello (live in London at Royal Festival Hall, October 29, 1998) – 4:07
8. "I Just Don't Know What to Do with Myself" by Burt Bacharach and Elvis Costello (live in New York City, Sessions at West 54th, October 18, 1998) – 3:05

== Personnel ==
- Burt Bacharach – piano, conducting, production
- Elvis Costello – vocals, production, liner notes

Additional personnel

- Julien Barber – viola
- Elena Barere – violin
- David Carey – vibraphone
- Dave Coy – bass
- Paulinho Da Costa – percussion
- Earle Dumler – oboe solo
- Lawrence Feldman – flute
- Barry Finclair – violin
- Rick Giovinazzo – orchestra
- Gary Grant – flugelhorn
- Jerry Hey – flugelhorn
- Dan Higgins – baritone saxophone
- Eddie Karam – string conducting
- Randy Kerber – keyboards
- Steve Kujala – flute
- Joe Lizzi – engineering
- Richard Locker – cello
- Johnny Mandel – orchestra
- Frank Marocco – accordion
- Rob Mounsey – keyboards
- Jan Mullen – violin
- David Nadien – violin
- Steve Nieve – piano
- Chris Parker – drums
- Dean Parks – guitar solo
- Paul Peabody – violin
- Greg Phillinganes – keyboards, synthesizer
- John Pintavalle – violin
- Sue Pray – viola
- Rob Schrock – keyboards
- Laura Seaton – violin
- Mark Shuman – cello
- Lew Soloff* – flugelhorn
- Richard Sortomme – violin
- David Spinozza – guitar
- Lloyd Stripling – flugelhorn
- Marti Sweet – violin
- Lisa Taylor – vocal solo
- Donna Tocco – violin
- Belinda Whitney-Barratt – violin solo
- T-Bone Wolk – bass

== See also ==
- List of 2023 albums
