= Bricks (band) =

American indie rock band

- Origin: New York City
- Genres: Indie rock, lo-fi
- Years active: 1988–1990; 1994
- Labels: Merge Records, Simple Machines
- Past members: Mac McCaughan; Laura Cantrell; Andrew Webster; Josh Phillips

Bricks were an indie rock band founded in New York City in the late 1980s. The group was formed by Merge Records co-founder Mac McCaughan while he was studying at Columbia University, along with Nashville-born singer-songwriter Laura Cantrell, plus classmates Andrew Webster and Josh Phillips. The foursome recorded at least 18 lo-fi songs between 1988 and 1990, which they released on a cassette and two 7-inch singles before disbanding. Their first single, "Girl With The Carrot Skin", enjoyed college radio airplay and was also made into a music video. Shot on super-8 film, the video featured the band eating and playing with copious amounts of carrots.

== History ==
Bricks was started by Mac McCaughan and Andrew Webster in 1988 while the two were roommates on 108th Street in Manhattan. McCaughan has just returned to Columbia University from a year off and began recording songs on a four-track cassette tape recorder. One night while recording with headphones on, McCaughan heard a loud noise and, thinking it was a gunshot, hit the floor. It turned out to be a brick that a neighbor had thrown through their apartment window, and thus the band named themselves "Bricks" in tribute to the event.

Because McCaughan and Webster had no space for a drumkit in their apartment, percussion sounds were made with household objects, such as empty juice bottles hit with sticks, or Tupperware containers filled with dried grains and shaken. The duo soon recruited Josh Phillips because he was taking drum lessons, and then Laura Cantrell to help keep time and sing. Many of the band's songs were about life in the apartment, where the band continued to practice. The group also recorded a set of Albanian Christmas songs.

Between his junior and senior years at Columbia, McCaughan drove across country to visit Sub Pop Records during the week that Mudhoney's first single was released. Seeing the operations of the label at the onset of Seattle's grunge music scene inspired McCaughan to found Merge Records, among whose first releases were Bricks' Winterspring cassette (MRG001, featuring the first seven songs recorded by the McCaughan/Webster duo) and "The Girl With The Carrot Skin" single (MRG005, featuring all four members), both released in 1989. By 1990 Bricks were playing shows with well-known indie bands, such as Fugazi, and at punk rock venues, like CBGB's in New York and the Cat's Cradle in Chapel Hill, NC, before disbanding when members finished at Columbia.

== Member activity post-Bricks ==
After her time deejaying on Columbia's radio station WKCR, Cantrell hosted Radio Thrift Shop, a country music show on freeform radio station WFMU that aired from 1993 to 2005. In 1996 she began recording and releasing her own country music records, with her first full-length album Not the Tremblin' Kind launching in 2000.

McCaughan moved to Chapel Hill, North Carolina and co-founded the band Superchunk in 1989, releasing the group's first singles on Merge Records, the label he launched and continues to run with Superchunk bassist Laura Ballance. In 1992 McCaughan started Portastatic as a solo recording project, which later became a full-fledged band.

Webster went on to play bass in the Arlington, Virginia band Tsunami while working in documentary film production. He has also appeared in the bands Geek, Piper Club and the Strugglers.

Phillips is currently the chair of the English department at the University of Memphis.

== Reissues and reunions ==
Bricks' original sessions were later compiled on the 1992 CD A Microphone And A Box Of Dirt, named for a line in the song "Spy Kitty". Through an accounting error, each band member was paid $1,000 for the album's sales. The band reunited in 1994 and were recorded live by Bob Weston at the Black Cat in Washington, D.C. for an appearance on Simple Machines' Working Holiday! compilation album. Two more songs from Bricks' Albanian Christmas set—"Don't Hog The Nog, Zog" and "Abanian Magi"—surfaced on Simple Machines’ 7-inch singles series that same year.

== Discography ==
- Winterspring cassette album (Merge Records, 1989)
- "The Girl With The Carrot Skin" 7-inch single (Merge Records, 1989)
- "The Getting Wet Part" 7-inch single (Merge Records, 1992)
- A Microphone And A Box Of Dirt compact disc compilation (Merge Records, 1992)
- Welcome To The Working Holiday Party 7-inch EP (Simple Machines, 1994)

=== Compilation appearances ===
- "You Shouldn't Have Smashed Your Guitar" on the Rows Of Teeth CD (Merge Records, 1994)
- "Girl With The Carrot Skin" (live) on the Working Holiday! double CD (Simple Machines, 1994)
- "History of Lies" on the Old Enough To Know Better 3-CD set (Merge Records, 2002)
