= Sad Girl (album) =

Studio album by Amy Allison
- Released: September 25, 2001
- Genre: Alternative country
- Length: 40:23
- Label: Diesel Only, Glitterhouse Records

Amy Allison chronology
The Maudlin Years (1996)	Sad Girl (2001)	No Frills Friend (2003)

Sad Girl is the second solo album by alternative country musician Amy Allison. It was released on September 25, 2001 on Diesel Only Records in the United States, following its earlier release on Glitterhouse Records in Europe. It features contributions from Greg Leisz, Mike Daly (Whiskeytown), Will Rigby (dB's, Steve Earle), and Neal Casal.

== Reception ==
Professional ratings
Review scores
Source	Rating
AllMusic	3/5 stars
Lakeland Ledger	3.5/4 stars
Robert Christgau	(A−)
Sacramento News & Review	(positive)

No Depression wrote that the album's 12 songs "exhibit a directness of expression, a simple universality clearly achieved with considerable composing and life experience." A more mixed review in the New York Post criticized Allison's voice on the album as "a stuffed nasal style that makes every song sound like she should see a doctor."

== Track listing ==
1. Listless and Lonesome
2. One Thing in Mind
3. Sad Girl
4. Everybody Thinks You're an Angel
5. It's Not Wrong
6. Family
7. Shadow of a Man
8. Sad State of Affairs
9. Where Did You Go?
10. Lost on You
11. Do I Miss You?
12. New Year's Eve
