= The Other Side (T Bone Burnett album) =

Studio album by T Bone Burnett
- Released: April 19, 2024
- Recorded: Pinhead Recorders (Nashville); The Village (Los Angeles)
- Genre: Country blues
- Length: 39:55
- Label: Verve
- Producer: T Bone Burnett; Colin Linden; Mike Piersante

T Bone Burnett chronology
The Invisible Light: Spells (2022)	The Other Side (2024)	The Coward Brothers (2024)

The Other Side is an album by American musician T Bone Burnett, released on April 19, 2024, through Verve Records. It includes collaborations with Rosanne Cash, Steven Soles, and the band Lucius. The album received positive reviews from critics and was nominated for Best Americana Album at the 2025 Grammy Awards.

== Background ==
Burnett wrote and recorded the tracks in a three-week period after purchasing several new guitars while working on the final chapter of the intended trilogy of albums that began with The Invisible Light: Acoustic Space (2019) and The Invisible Light: Spells (2022).

== Critical reception ==
Professional ratings
Aggregate scores
Source	Rating
Metacritic	87/100
Review scores
Source	Rating
AllMusic	4/5 stars
Mojo	4/5 stars
Uncut	9/10

The Other Side received a score of 87 out of 100 on review aggregator Metacritic based on reviews from four critics, which the website categorized as "universal acclaim". Mojo called the album "probably the most honest reflection of himself he's ever made", and Uncut described it as "supremely inviting, warm and ruefully radiant" and "a crown on a career still going strong".

Jim Hynes of Glide Magazine found it to be a "return" to Burnett's "roots" as a singer-songwriter and noted that it is "simple on the surface, basically a country blues effort" with "a sneaky quality. It will grow on you after a few listens." Mark Deming of AllMusic characterized the album as "a collection of 12 songs of uncluttered eloquence informed by Burnett's belief in the human spirit, while the arrangements are almost exclusively taken up by acoustic instruments and vocals".

== Track listing ==
All tracks are written by T Bone Burnett, with additional writers noted.

The Other Side track listing
No.	Title	Writer(s)	Length
1.	"He Came Down"		4:33
2.	"Come Back (When You Go Away)"		2:56
3.	"(I'm Gonna Get Over This) Some Day" (featuring Rosanne Cash)		3:15
4.	"Waiting for You" (featuring Lucius)	Colin Linden	2:58
5.	"The Pain of Love" (featuring Lucius)		2:27
6.	"The Race Is Won" (featuring Lucius)		3:17
7.	"Sometimes I Wonder"	Linden	3:45
8.	"Hawaiian Blue Song" (featuring Steven Soles)	Bob Neuwirth; Steven Soles	3:35
9.	"The First Light of Day"	Soles	2:51
10.	"Everything and Nothing"	Gary Nicholson	2:45
11.	"The Town That Time Forgot" (featuring Lucius)	Peter More	4:04
12.	"Little Darling" (featuring Lucius)		3:29
Total length:			39:55

== Personnel ==
Musicians

- T Bone Burnett – vocals (all tracks), acoustic guitar (tracks 2–9, 11, 12), electric guitar (3, 4, 7–12)
- Colin Linden – Dobro (tracks 1–4, 8, 11), acoustic guitar (2, 6–8, 10–12), electric guitar (3–5, 7, 9, 11, 12), Kalamazoo guitar (4), National guitar (6), 12-string acoustic guitar (6, 9, 10)
- Dennis Crouch – string bass (tracks 3, 5, 6, 8–12)
- Rosanne Cash – harmony vocals (track 3)
- Lucius – harmony vocals (tracks 4–6, 11, 12)
- Rory Hoffman – Dobro, Claviola (track 6); clarinet, cuatro, acoustic guitar (10)
- Stuart Duncan – mandolin (tracks 6, 10), violin (8, 10)
- Peter More – harmony vocals (tracks 6, 11)
- Mike Piersante – tambourine (tracks 7, 9), handclaps (7)
- Jay Bellerose – handclaps, tambourine (track 7)
- Weyes Blood – harmony vocals (track 7)
- Steven Soles – harmony vocals, hi-strung acoustic guitar (track 8)

Technical

- Colin Linden – production (all tracks), engineering (tracks 6, 8, 11)
- Mike Piersante – production, mixing (all tracks); engineering (tracks 2–5, 7, 8, 10, 11)
- T Bone Burnett – production
- Gavin Lurssen – mastering
- Reuben Cohen – mastering
- Mike Stankiewicz – engineering (tracks 1, 2, 5, 6, 9, 12)

Visuals

- Kyledidthis – creative direction, design
- Dan Winters – photography
- Tai Linzie – art coordination

== Charts ==
Chart performance for The Other Side
Chart (2024)	Peak position
Swiss Albums (Schweizer Hitparade)	95
