= When the Roses Bloom Again =

Studio album by Laura Cantrell
- Released: September 23, 2002 (UK); September 24, 2002 (US)
- Recorded: 2002
- Genre: Country
- Length: 41:56
- Label: Spit and Polish (UK); Diesel Only (US)
- Producer: Jay Sherman-Godfrey

Laura Cantrell chronology
Not the Tremblin' Kind (2000)	When the Roses Bloom Again (2002)	Humming by the Flowered Vine (2005)

Professional ratings
Review scores
Source	Rating
Allmusic	link
Rolling Stone	4/5 stars
Robert Christgau	link

When the Roses Bloom Again is the second album by Laura Cantrell, originally released in 2002.

== Track listing ==
1. "Too Late for Tonight" (Cantrell, Francis MacDonald) – 2:30
2. "All the Same to You" (Joe Flood) – 3:06
3. "Early Years" (Cantrell) – 3:38
4. "Don't Break the Heart" (Amy Rigby) – 3:47
5. "Wait" (Jay Sherman-Godfrey) – 3:23
6. "Mountain Fern" (Cantrell) – 4:15
7. "Vaguest Idea" (Dan Prater) – 3:06
8. "Yonder Comes a Freight Train" (Ray Pennington) – 3:21
9. "Broken Again" (Cantrell) – 3:43
10. "When the Roses Bloom Again" (Cobb/Edwards, arranged by Wilco) – 4:05
11. "Conqueror's Song" (Dave Schramm) – 3:52
12. "Oh So Many Years" (Frankie Bailes) – 3:10

== Personnel ==
- Laura Cantrell - vocals
- Jay Sherman-Godfrey - acoustic guitar, electric guitar, organ, piano, backing vocals
- Jon Graboff - pedal steel guitar, mandolin, electric guitar, acoustic guitar, autoharp
- Jeremy Chatzky - bass guitar
- Doug Wygal - drums
- Robin Goldwasser - backing vocals
- Mary Lee Kortes - backing vocals
- Dan Prater - backing vocals
- Kenny Kosek - violin
