= Trains and Boats and Planes =

1965 song by Burt Bacharach and Hal David

Single by Burt Bacharach and his Orchestra & Chorus

from the album Hit Maker!: Burt Bacharach Plays the Burt Bacharach Hits
- A-side: "Trains and Boats and Planes"
- B-side: "Wives and Lovers"
- Released: May 1965
- Genre: Traditional pop
- Label: Kapp / London
- Songwriters: Burt Bacharach, Hal David

"Trains and Boats and Planes" is a song written by composer Burt Bacharach and lyricist Hal David. Hit versions were recorded by Bacharach in 1965, by Billy J. Kramer and the Dakotas in the same year, and by Dionne Warwick in 1966.

== Original 1965 recordings ==
Bacharach and David wrote the song at a time when they had achieved great popular success. Bacharach, in particular, was traveling widely to record and promote his songs. The pair intended the song to be recorded by Gene Pitney, who had had several hits with earlier Bacharach and David songs, including "Only Love Can Break a Heart" and "Twenty Four Hours from Tulsa". However, Pitney declined to record it, telling Bacharach, "it's not one of your better ones". Bacharach then recorded it in London, with an orchestra, chorus, and uncredited vocals by female session singers The Breakaways. His version was issued on the 1965 album Hit Maker!: Burt Bacharach Plays the Burt Bacharach Hits and as a single. According to writer Serene Dominic,

[the Breakaways'] dispassionate delivery blends perfectly with Hal David's haunted verses, which give all the responsibility for coming and going to the transportation and not the passengers ... Trains and boats and planes are capable of bringing back someone they took away, if the person they left behind prays hard enough for their return.

While a special show was being recorded by Bacharach at the Granada Television studios in Manchester, producer Johnnie Hamp heard the song and arranged for it to be offered to a group who also recorded there, the Four Just Men (who later recorded as Wimple Winch). They turned it down, and the song then came to the attention of Brian Epstein, who suggested that Billy J. Kramer record it. Kramer's recording was released at about the same time as Bacharach's own version, and both recordings entered the UK Singles Chart in the same week in May 1965. Other, less commercially successful, versions were issued in the UK around the same time by Anita Harris and Alma Cogan, and recordings were made in French by Claude François and Renée Martel ("Quand un bateau passe"). Within the same year, a German language version, ("Frag doch nur dein Herz") was recorded by Die Five Tops.

Bacharach's version reached No. 4 on the UK chart in 1965, while Kramer's recording reached No. 12 in the UK, becoming his final chart hit. When released in North America, Kramer's version reached No. 47 on the Billboard Hot 100, No. 10 on Billboard's Easy Listening chart, and No. 13 for 2 weeks on Canada's CHUM Chart co-charting with Bacharach's version.

== Dionne Warwick version ==
"Trains and Boats and Planes"

Single by Dionne Warwick

from the album Here Where There Is Love
- B-side: "Don't Go Breaking My Heart"
- Released: June 5, 1966
- Recorded: 1966
- Studio: Bell Sound (New York City)
- Genre: Pop; soul
- Length: 2:46
- Label: Scepter
- Songwriters: Burt Bacharach; Hal David
- Producers: Burt Bacharach; Hal David

Dionne Warwick singles chronology
"Message to Michael" (1966)	"Trains and Boats and Planes" (1966)	"I Just Don't Know What to Do with Myself" (1966)

Dionne Warwick recorded the song in 1966. Her version was arranged and conducted by Bacharach, and produced by Bacharach and David. The track was released as the first single from her album, Here Where There Is Love on Scepter Records. It spent seven weeks on the Billboard Hot 100 chart, and reached No. 22 on August 6, 1966. Warwick's version also reached No. 37 on Billboard's Easy Listening chart and No. 49 on Billboard's Hot Rhythm & Blues Singles chart.

=== Track listing ===
- US, 7" Vinyl single

A1: "Trains and Boats and Planes" – 2:46
B1: "Don't Go Breaking My Heart" – 2:21

- UK, 7" Vinyl single

A1: "Trains and Boats and Planes" – 2:46
B1: "Don't Go Breaking My Heart" – 2:20

- Australia, 7" Vinyl single

A1: "Trains and Boats and Planes" – 2:47
B1: "Don't Go Breaking My Heart" – 2:20

=== Charts ===
Chart (1966)	Peak position
Canada Top Singles (RPM)	18
US Billboard Hot 100	22
US Adult Contemporary (Billboard)	37
US Hot R&B/Hip-Hop Songs (Billboard)	49

== Other recordings ==
Other recordings include those by Chet Baker (1966), The Everly Brothers, the Box Tops, The Shadows (instrumental), Joanie Sommers, Dinah Shore (all in 1967), Astrud Gilberto (1969), Fred Frith (1997), Fountains of Wayne (2003), Gwyneth Herbert and Will Rutter on their 2003 album First Songs, Dwight Yoakam (2003), Laura Cantrell on her 2008 EP Trains and Boats and Planes and Stacey Kent on her 2006 album A Time For Love.
