= The Coward Brothers (album) =

2024 album by Elvis Costello and T Bone Burnett

Soundtrack album by Elvis Costello and T Bone Burnett (as The Coward Brothers)
- Released: 21 November 2024
- Studios: Electric Lady (New York); East Iris (Nashville); Blackbird (Nashville); The Village (Los Angeles); Brown's Hotel (London); 12th Street Sound (New York); Peabody Hotel (Memphis)
- Genre: Rock
- Length: 57:27
- Label: New West
- Producers: T Bone Burnett; Elvis Costello (as Henry and Howard Coward)

Elvis Costello chronology
| The Songs of Bacharach & Costello (2023) | The Coward Brothers (2024) |

T Bone Burnett chronology
| The Other Side (2024) | The Coward Brothers (2024) |

Singles from The Coward Brothers
- 1. "Always" Released: 8 October 2024

The Coward Brothers is a collaborative album by English musician Elvis Costello and American musician T Bone Burnett, released on 21 November 2024 through New West Records. It serves as the soundtrack to the duo's audio comedy (described as a "wireless drama" by Costello), entitled The True Story of the Coward Brothers. Its plot sees Costello and Burnett, as Howard and Henry Coward, respectively, playing "a trans-Atlantic pair of con men who may or may not be blood relatives."

== Background ==
Costello and Burnett have a history of collaboration, dating back to the 1985 single "The People's Limousine", the first release to be credited to "The Coward Brothers". The Coward Brothers were also the credited producers of Costello's 1987 single "Blue Chair". Without using the "Coward Brothers" identity, Costello and Burnett also collaborated on the production of Costello's albums King of America (1986) and Spike (1989), and Burnett has produced Costello's albums Secret, Profane & Sugarcane (2009) and National Ransom (2010), as well as producing work by The New Basement Tapes which featured Costello as a member. Costello has also contributed to Burnett's albums as a co-songwriter of selected tracks.

The album was released in tandem with the radio play The True Story of the Coward Brothers on Audible. In addition to Burnett and Costello, the play features Christopher Guest, Rhea Seehorn, and Harry Shearer, among others.

== Track listing ==
The Coward Brothers track listing
| No. | Title | Writer(s) | Length |
|---|---|---|---|
| 1. | "Always" | T Bone Burnett; Elvis Costello | 2:26 |
| 2. | "Like Licorice" | Costello | 1:58 |
| 3. | "My Baby Just Squeals (You Heel)" | Costello | 3:08 |
| 4. | "The Devil's Wife" | Burnett; Costello | 4:43 |
| 5. | "Tipsy Woman" | Costello | 4:26 |
| 6. | "My Baby Just Purrs (You're Mine, Not Hers)" | Costello | 2:32 |
| 7. | "My Baby Just Whistles (Here Comes the Missiles)" | Costello | 1:50 |
| 8. | "World Serious" | Burnett; Costello | 3:00 |
| 9. | "Early Shirley" | Costello | 2:34 |
| 10. | "Yesteryear Is Near" | Costello | 1:43 |
| 11. | "Birkenhead Girl" | Costello | 3:16 |
| 12. | "Smoke-Ring Angel" | Costello; Christopher Guest | 1:55 |
| 13. | "Wooden Woman" | Burnett; Costello | 2:33 |
| 14. | "(I Don't Want Your) Lyndon Johnson" | Costello | 2:24 |
| 15. | "Lotta Money" | Burnett; Costello; Guest | 4:34 |
| 16. | "Pure Bubblegum" | Costello | 3:29 |
| 17. | "Cathy Come Home" | Costello | 3:11 |
| 18. | "Bygones" | Burnett | 1:41 |
| 19. | "Row Me Once" | Burnett; Costello; Guest | 2:41 |
| 20. | "Clown Around Town" | Costello | 3:22 |
| Total length: | | | 57:27 |

Note: Writing credits refer to Burnett and Costello by their character names (Henry and Howard Coward, respectively). Christopher Guest is credited as "Christopher Guest-Coward".

== Personnel ==
Adapted from the album's liner notes:

=== Musicians ===
- Elvis Costello (as Howard Coward) – vocals (all tracks), acoustic guitar (2, 6, 9, 19), upright piano (2, 10, 15, 19), organ (2), electric guitar (3–7, 11, 12, 14, 20), sounds (4), electric bass (5, 7, 10, 11, 14, 16), tambourine (6, 7, 10, 11, 15), drums (7, 10, 11, 15), whistle (7), bass drum (9), handclaps (14); drum machine, Moog synthesizer (16); grand piano (17); congas, percussion (19)
- T Bone Burnett (as Henry Coward) – vocals (tracks 1, 4, 5, 7, 8, 10–13, 15, 17–19), electric guitar (1, 4, 5, 7, 8, 12, 13, 18, 20), electric bass (1, 2, 8), six-string bass (3, 6, 9, 12, 13, 15, 17, 19, 20), electric sitar (5)
- Christopher Guest (as Christopher Guest-Coward) – "missiles" (track 7), vocals (9, 15, 19), acoustic guitar (12, 15, 19)
- Colin Linden – electric sitar (track 1), electric guitar (8), slide Dobro (18)
- Dennis Crouch – double bass (tracks 8, 18)
- Russell Pahl – pedal steel (8)
- Jay Bellerose – drums, percussion (tracks 4, 8, 18)
- Paul Kowert – arco bass (track 1)
- Diana Krall (as Jean Coward) – upright piano (track 2), grand piano (3)
- "Peter Coward" – military drum (track 17)
- "Dexter Coward" – gunshots (track 17)
- "Concepta Collins" – heels (track 3)

=== Technical ===
- Elvis Costello (as Howard Coward) – production
- T Bone Burnett (as Henry Coward) – production
- Rachael Moore – mixing, recording
- Michael Piersante – mixing, recording
- Gavin Larssen – mastering
- Reuben Cohen – matsering
- Jeff Powell – vinyl mastering
- Billy Theriot – additional engineering
- Miek Stankiewicz – additional engineering
- Collin Bryson – engineering assistance
- Austin Brown – engineering assistance
- Karl Wingate – engineering assistance
- Eddie Roberts – engineering assistance
- Ivy Skoff – production coordination

=== Artwork ===
- Drew Christie – illustrations
- Tom Bejgrowicz – design, layout
