= Not the Tremblin' Kind =

Studio album by Laura Cantrell
- Released: October 24, 2000 (US)
- Recorded: Studio G Jolly Roger; Hank's 'Hey Now' Studio
- Genre: Country
- Label: Diesel Only (US); Spit and Polish (UK)
- Producer: Jay Sherman-Godfrey

Laura Cantrell chronology
Not the Tremblin' Kind (2000)	When the Roses Bloom Again (2002)

Professional ratings
Review scores
Source	Rating
AllMusic	4/5 stars
The Encyclopedia of Popular Music	4/5 stars
Pitchfork	7.4/10
Rolling Stone	4/5 stars
Uncut	2/5 stars
USA Today	3/4 stars

Not the Tremblin' Kind is the debut studio album by the American singer-songwriter Laura Cantrell. It was released in 2000 on Diesel Only Records. The album bears a dedication to "the original Beverly Hillbilly", Zeke Manners.

== Critical reception ==
Pitchfork wrote: "Although not a flawless album, Not the Tremblin' Kind can still measure up pretty well to most of the revered alt-country releases of the last decade: albums such as Freakwater's Old Paint, the Blood Oranges' Corn River, and Victoria Williams' Loose." The Record praised Cantrell's "winning urban honky-tonk-angel sensibility."

Shortly after its release, John Peel named the album as possibly one of the favorites of his life.

== Track listing ==
1. "Not the Tremblin' Kind" (George Usher) – 3:37
2. "Little Bit of You" (Jay Sherman-Godfrey) – 4:19
3. "Queen of the Coast" (Laura Cantrell) – 4:59
4. "Pile of Woe" (Joe Flood) – 3:34
5. "Two Seconds" (Robert McCreedy) – 3:58
6. "Churches off the Interstate" (Laura Cantrell) – 2:59
7. "The Whiskey Makes You Sweeter" (Amy Allison) – 5:07
8. "Do You Ever Think of Me" (Dan Prater) – 2:44
9. "Big Wheel" (Jay Sherman-Godfrey, Jeremy Tepper) – 2:30
10. "My Heart Goes Out to You" (Laura Cantrell) – 4:06
11. "Somewhere, Some Night" (Carl Montgomery) – 3:24
12. "The Way It Is" (Laura Cantrell) – 3:48

== Personnel ==
- Laura Cantrell – lead vocals
- Will Rigby – drums, percussion
- Jeremy Chatzky – electric bass, acoustic bass
- Jon Graboff – mandolin, acoustic guitar, 12-string electric guitar, pedal steel guitar
- Robin Goldwasser – harmony vocals, melodica
- Mary Lee Kortes – harmony vocals
- Jay Sherman-Godfrey – acoustic guitar, electric guitar, organ, harmony vocals
