= Painted from Memory =

Studio album by Burt Bacharach and Elvis Costello
- Released: 29 September 1998
- Recorded: 1995–1998
- Venue: Ocean Way Recording
- Genres: Pop, orchestral pop
- Length: 52:07
- Label: Mercury
- Producers: Burt Bacharach and Elvis Costello

Elvis Costello chronology
Extreme Honey (1997)	Painted from Memory (1998)	The Very Best of Elvis Costello (1999)

Burt Bacharach chronology
Woman (1979)	Painted from Memory (1998)	The Sweetest Punch (1999)

Professional ratings
Review scores
Source	Rating
AllMusic	4.5/5 stars
The Baltimore Sun	3.5/4 stars
Encyclopedia of Popular Music	3/5 stars
Entertainment Weekly	B+
Los Angeles Times	3.5/4 stars
NME	8/10
Pitchfork	7.0/10
Q	4/5 stars
Rolling Stone	4/5 stars
The Rolling Stone Album Guide	4/5 stars
Spin	8/10

Painted from Memory is a collaboration album by Elvis Costello and Burt Bacharach, released on 29 September 1998 through Mercury Records, a division of Universal Music Group.

== Background ==
Costello had long been a Bacharach fan, and had recorded several Bacharach songs, beginning with "I Just Don't Know What to Do with Myself," released on a 1978 Stiff Records compilation Live Stiffs Live. Costello would also cover "I'll Never Fall in Love Again" for the soundtrack to Austin Powers: The Spy Who Shagged Me, with both he and Bacharach performing it in the film – a callback to Bacharach's cameo appearance in the first film.

The songwriting collaboration between Bacharach and Costello commenced with "God Give Me Strength," a commission for the 1996 film Grace of My Heart, directed by Allison Anders, starring Illeana Douglas, with lead vocals by Kristen Vigard. Pleased with the result, the pair expanded the project to this full album, the first for Costello after an absence of two years, and for Bacharach after an absence of 21 years. Lyrics and music are co-credited to both Bacharach and Costello. In his 2015 autobiography, Unfaithful Music and Disappearing Ink, Costello wrote, "To have written a song like "God Give Me Strength" and simply stopped would have been ridiculous, so about a year later we began a series of writing sessions."

A companion album, The Sweetest Punch, was made concurrently by jazz guitarist Bill Frisell, released in 1999 on another Universal label, Decca Records. It consists of jazz arrangements of the Painted From Memory songs done by Frisell and his studio group. Frisell was working from demos of the songs, and arranged his versions independently of those on the Costello-Bacharach album. Frisell's album features vocals by Costello on two songs, and by jazz singer Cassandra Wilson on two songs, one of which is a duet employing both.

"I Still Have That Other Girl" won a Grammy Award in 1998 for "Best Pop Collaboration with Vocals" for Bacharach and Costello. Costello later wrote, "One day, while writing "I Still Have that Other Girl", we reached an impasse as to how to get to the full chorus. I was looking out of the window for inspiration when Burt began to play something I'd never heard before. It sounded beautiful, sort of Viennese. We were running a digital recorder to catch our working sketches, but when the recording was played back it was mostly obscured by me yelling, "That's it, you've got it, [...] Fortunately my overexcited babble didn't completely cover the invention, and we were able to decode the recording and complete the song". The album was recorded and mixed by Kevin Killen.

Following the album's release, Costello and Bacharach performed songs from the album together at only a limited number of venues. One of these comprised a second-season episode of the American public television program Sessions at West 54th, later released on VHS. Also at this time, however, Costello began playing a different style of live concerts, accompanied by only longtime keyboardist Steve Nieve on piano. In 1999, Costello subsequently embarked on the Lonely World Tour, performed in this style with Nieve receiving equal billing; songs from Painted from Memory were a prominent part of the setlists on this tour.

Songs from the album remain in Costello's live repertoire. A rendition of "God Give Me Strength" closes Costello's 2004 orchestrated live album My Flame Burns Blue, while some of Bacharach's later concerts with regular singer John Pagano also incorporated "God Give Me Strength".

== Track listing ==
All tracks are written by Elvis Costello & Burt Bacharach.

Side one
No.	Title	Length
1.	"In the Darkest Place"	4:19
2.	"Toledo"	4:35
3.	"I Still Have That Other Girl"	2:46
4.	"This House Is Empty Now"	5:10
5.	"Tears at the Birthday Party"	4:38
6.	"Such Unlikely Lovers"	3:24

Side two
No.	Title	Length
7.	"My Thief"	4:20
8.	"The Long Division"	4:15
9.	"Painted from Memory"	4:12
10.	"The Sweetest Punch"	4:09
11.	"What's Her Name Today?"	4:08
12.	"God Give Me Strength"	6:11
Total length:		52:07

1999 limited edition bonus disc
No.	Title	Length
1.	"This House Is Empty Now" (live on Late Night with Conan O'Brien, 27 November 1998)	4:12
2.	"I Still Have That Other Girl" (live at Shibuya Public Hall, Tokyo, 10 February 1999)	3:18
3.	"In the Darkest Place" (live at the Melbourne Athenaeum, 16 February 1999)	4:40
4.	"Painted from Memory" (live at the Melbourne Athenaeum, 16 February 1999)	4:26
5.	"What's Her Name Today?" (live at Shibuya Hall, Tokyo, 10 February 1999)	4:31

== Charts ==
Chart (1998)	Peak position
Australian Albums (ARIA)	26
Dutch Albums (Album Top 100)	33
New Zealand Albums (RMNZ)	38
Norwegian Albums (VG-lista)	29
Swedish Albums (Sverigetopplistan)	18
UK Albums (Official Charts)	32
US Billboard 200	78

== Documentary ==
Prior to the recording of the album, Irish film producer Phillip King proposed to Costello that a film should be made to document the process. The resulting film, Because It's a Lonely World, was produced by King's company, Hummingbird Productions; the title, taken from the lyrics of "What's Her Name Today?", was also originally a working title for the album itself and part of a promotional tagline for the album. The hour-long documentary originally aired in the UK on Channel 4 on 26 December 1998, and in the U.S., Bravo, which was then expanding its original programming lineup during the midst of a major advertising campaign, aired it on 20 October 1999.

== 2014 musical ==
On 24 September 2014, the album was performed by Australian musical theatre stars Michael Falzon and Bobby Fox at Sydney's City Recital Hall. Falzon approached Fox in 2014 with a view to recreate the iconic 1998 album because, according to him,

"It's very much written from the heart and experience and it resonates so deeply with people. Because of the lyrics and because you can hear that hurt, you get all the emotions. And with Bacharach and Costello it's not just the lyrics; there are the clever arrangements that take you there anyway."

The concert version featured popular hits by Bacharach and Costello during the first act, with a retelling of the album by Fox and Falzon in the second featuring Laura Bunting. It was produced by City Recital Hall and directed by Jonathan Biggins with musical director Isaac Hayward.
