= Parlor James =

American alt country duo

- Origin: New York City, New York
- Genres: Alternative country
- Years active: 1994–1998
- Labels: Discovery, Sire
- Past members: Amy Allison, Ryan Hedgecock

Parlor James was a short-lived American alternative country duo active in the 1990s. The group's members were Amy Allison and Lone Justice's Ryan Hedgecock, who first met each other at a Mercury Lounge songwriter's night. Allison came up with the name "Parlor James" on a whim, after spontaneously encountering the words in a dream. Originally formed in 1994, they released their debut EP, Dreadful Sorry, on Discovery Records in 1996. It was produced by Malcolm Burn, primarily on home recording equipment. Their full-length debut, Old Dreams, was released on Sire Records in 1998. It was also produced by Burn. By 2001, it was considered very unlikely that the duo would release any more music.

== Reviews ==
In a favorable review of Dreadful Sorry in No Depression, Rob Bleetstein wrote that "Parlor James displays all the promise and passion Lone Justice lost after their first album, and the prospect of great musical growth is there for the taking." The Chicago Tribune's Greg Dretzka gave Dreadful Sorry 3 out of 4 stars, writing that Parlor James' "...strange blend of vocal styles should interest the same folks who found Emmylou Harris' format-bending "Wrecking Ball" to their liking." In his review of Old Dreams, Bill Friskics-Warren wrote that "When judiciously applied, the dots and loops on Old Dreams enable Parlor James to breathe new life into the mountain ballad tradition. And yet...the duo's close harmony singing, the thing that brought them together in the first place, is ultimately what makes their collaboration work." Greg Jerrett gave Old Dreams 4 out of 5 stars, comparing the album to "a big old stew made out of influences from every conceivable source in modern music", adding, "...if you want something which represents the last few years of the millennium, "Old Dreams" will fit the bill, just you wait and see."

== Discography ==
- Dreadful Sorry (Discovery, 1996)
- Old Dreams (Sire, 1998)
