= The Invisible Light: Spells =

Studio album by T Bone Burnett, Jay Bellerose and Keefus Ciancia
- Released: August 5, 2022
- Length: 44:50
- Label: Verve Forecast
- Producer: T Bone Burnett

T Bone Burnett chronology
| The Invisible Light: Acoustic Space (2019) | The Invisible Light: Spells (2022) | The Other Side (2024) |

The Invisible Light: Spells is a collaborative album by American musician T Bone Burnett, drummer Jay Bellerose and keyboardist Keefus Ciancia, released on August 5, 2022, through Verve Forecast Records. It is the second installment in The Invisible Light series, following The Invisible Light: Acoustic Space (2019). The album received positive reviews from critics.

== Critical reception ==
Professional ratings
Aggregate scores
| Source | Rating |
|---|---|
| Metacritic | 70/100 |
Review scores
| Source | Rating |
| AllMusic | 3.5/5 stars |
| American Songwriter | 3/5 stars |
| PopMatters | 7/10 |
| Uncut | 7/10 |

The Invisible Light: Spells received a score of 70 out of 100 on review aggregator Metacritic based on reviews from five critics, which the website categorized as "generally favorable" reception. Uncut felt that "The likes of 'Casting a Spell' and 'You May Leave But This Will Bring You Back' reassure that Burnett's formidable facility for waspish wordplay remains intact." Mark Deming of AllMusic found it to be similar to Acoustic Space in that it is "built around the percussion of Burnett's longtime associate Jay Bellerose and the clouds of sound conjured by keyboardist Keefus Ciancia, generating slowly roiling sonic backdrops of rhythm and carefully sculpted noise, with Burnett chanting his verse over it all". Lee Zimmerman of American Songwriter said that it "veers sharply" from Acoustic Space as it "consists almost entirely of songs marked by didactic rhythms and ominous overtones" and a "heady fusion of trance, electronica, tribal and global music".

PopMatters' Steve Horowitz wrote that "Burnett and company go high tech to attack high tech" as "the lyrics offer whip-smart criticisms of technology and its users" and "the instrumentation and arrangements can be primal, martial, or formal then mixed with more contemporary electronic effects". Shawn Donohue of Glide Magazine commented that Burnett "continu[es] his avant-garde style, furthering his sense of desolation, end of times despair, and unflinching pessimism" with an album that "feels as if it was sonically inspired by the Talking Heads' Remain in Light track 'The Overload' with humming uncertainty, bleak windswept soundscapes, and a sense of percolating anxiety".

== Track listing ==
All tracks are written by T Bone Burnett, Jay Bellerose, and Keefus Ciancia.

The Invisible Light: Spells track listing
| No. | Title | Length |
|---|---|---|
| 1. | "Realities.com" | 4:50 |
| 2. | "I'm Starting a New Life Today" | 6:47 |
| 3. | "Mother Cross (We Think We Think)" | 3:25 |
| 4. | "A Better Day" | 7:47 |
| 5. | "Casting a Spell" | 6:17 |
| 6. | "You May Leave But This Will Bring You Back" | 5:35 |
| 7. | "Mother Cross (We Think We Think) (Reprise)" | 5:33 |
| 8. | "Itopia Chant" | 0:49 |
| 9. | "A Better Day (Reprise)" | 3:47 |
| Total length: | | 44:50 |
