= At This Time =

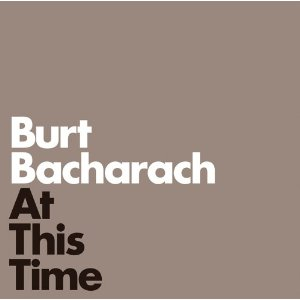

Studio album by Burt Bacharach
- Released: November 1, 2005
- Genres: Pop, rock
- Length: 53:12
- Label: Columbia
- Producer: Burt Bacharach

Burt Bacharach chronology
The Sweetest Punch (1999)	At This Time (2005)	The Songs of Bacharach & Costello (2023)

At This Time is an album by American pianist, composer and music producer Burt Bacharach, released in 2005 through Columbia Records. Guests include Elvis Costello and Rufus Wainwright. In 2006, it won a Grammy Award for Best Pop Instrumental Album.

== Reception ==
Professional ratings
Review scores
Source	Rating
AllMusic	2.5/5 stars
Robert Christgau	C−
Record Collector	4/5 stars
Slant	3.5/5 stars

== Track listing ==
1. "Please Explain" (Bacharach, Porter, Tonio K.) – 4:22
2. "Where Did It Go?" (Bacharach, Board, Tonio K.) – 4:21
3. "In Our Time" (Bacharach) – 4:09
4. "Who Are These People?" (Bacharach, Tonio K.) – 4:17
5. "Is Love Enough?" (Bacharach, Tonio K.) – 6:08
6. "Can't Give It Up" (Bacharach, Tonio K.) – 4:39
7. "Go Ask Shakespeare" (Bacharach, Tonio K.) – 5:45
8. "Dreams" (Bacharach, Chris Botti, Tonio) – 4:13
9. "Danger" (Bacharach) – 4:31
10. "Fade Away" (Bacharach) – 3:52
11. "Always Taking Aim" (Bacharach, Tonio K.) – 6:54

== Personnel ==
- Burt Bacharach – synthesizer, piano, arranger, composer, flugelhorn, keyboards, vocals, producer, Fender Rhodes, oberheim, audio production
- Dr. Dre – drum and bass loop
- Karen Elaine Bakunin – principal
- Charlie Bisharat – violin, concertmaster
- Printz Board – composer, drum loop
- Chris Botti – composer
- Denyse Buffum – principal
- Greg Burns – engineer
- Jeff Burns – engineer
- Mark Cargill – concertmaster
- Daniel Chase – percussion, digital editing
- Susan Chatman – concertmaster
- Billy Childs Trio – Wurlitzer
- Terry Christiansen – double bass
- Vinnie Colaiuta – drums
- Elvis Costello – vocals
- Jim Cox – piano, keyboards
- Paulinho da Costa – percussion
- John Daversa – trumpet, flugelhorn
- Mario Diaz de Leon – concertmaster
- Joel Derouin – violin, concertmaster
- Andrew Duckles – principal
- Earl Dumler – oboe
- John Eidsvoog – music preparation
- Mike Elizondo – bass programming
- Jerry Epstein – principal
- Michael Fisher – percussion
- Ron Folsom – concertmaster
- Armen Garabedian – concertmaster
- Berj Garabedian – concertmaster
- Grant Geissman – guitar
- Terry Glenny – concertmaster
- Gary Grant – trumpet, flugelhorn
- Dan Greco – percussion
- Andrew Hale – executive producer
- Olaf Heine – cover photo
- Dan Higgins – clarinet, saxophone, sax (alto)
- Josie James – vocals
- Suzie Katayama – music Preparation, principal
- Peter Kent – concertmaster
- Dmitri Kourka – principal
- Gina Kronstadt – concertmaster
- Warren Luening – trumpet, flugelhorn
- Sue Main – assistant
- Miguel Martinez – principal
- Darrin McCann – principal
- Dave O'Donnell – engineer
- John Pagano – vocals
- Don Palmer – concertmaster
- Cameron Patrick – concertmaster
- Mike Pela – engineer
- Ted Perlman – synthesizer, bass, programming, synthesizer programming
- Barbara Porter – concertmaster
- Denaun Porter – composer, loops, drum loop, bass programming
- Michele Richards – concertmaster
- John Robinson – drums
- Jimbo Ross – principal
- Rob Shrock – synthesizer
- Allen Sides – engineer, mixing, audio engineer
- Dan Tobin Smith – principal
- Sally Stevens – vocals
- Robert Stringer – executive producer
- Neil Stubenhaus – bass (electric)
- Donna Taylor – vocals
- JoAnn Tominaga – production coordination, strings contractor
- Tonio K. – composer
- Mari Tsumura – concertmaster
- Rufus Wainwright – vocals
- Evan Wilson – viola
- Margaret Wooten – concertmaster
- Alan Yoshida – mixing
- Shari Zippert – concertmaster
