= Where's Wolfie? =

Studio album by Wolfie
- Released: 1999
- Genre: indie rock
- Label: Parasol Records

Wolfie chronology
Awful Mess Mystery (1998)	Where's Wolfie? (1999)	Wolfie and the Coat and Hat (2000)

Professional ratings
Review scores
Source	Rating
Allmusic	4/5 stars
Pitchfork	(0.2/10)

Where's Wolfie is the second album by indie rock band Wolfie. It was released in 1999 via Parasol Records.

The album received some notoriety due to a review by Pitchfork. Giving the album a 0.2 rating, the review said that "after seeing Wolfie pound on a drumset and keyboard they obviously just got for Christmas from Service Merchandise, I proclaimed to a friend, 'My lord, that's total junk.'" Lead singer-songwriter Joe Ziemba responded with an irate letter to the reviewer, causing a stir.

== Track listing ==
1. "Little Bee Is Dancin'"
2. "Steely Dan"
3. "Mr. and Mrs. Season"
4. "Busy Busy Busy"
5. "I'm an Engineer"
6. "Forget About Friday"
7. "Ain't No Good News"
8. "On Loan to Satellite"
9. "Knew It Knew It"
10. "Buying an Engine"
11. "It's Thursday, Not Sunday (Thank Goodness)"
12. "Ambulances East"
13. "So Brother"
14. "You're Lucky I'm Skinny"
15. "You're Gonna Fall Back into It, but I'll Always Love You"
