= Wolfie and the Coat and Hat =

EP by Wolfie
- Released: 2000
- Genre: Indie rock
- Label: Kindercore Records

Wolfie chronology
Where's Wolfie? (1999)	Wolfie and the Coat and Hat (2000)	Tall Dark Hill (2001)

Professional ratings
Review scores
Source	Rating
Allmusic	4/5 stars
Popmatters	Favourable
Pitchfork Media	(4.9/10)

Wolfie and the Coat and Hat was an EP by indie rock band Wolfie. It was released in 2000 via Kindercore Records.

== Track listing ==
No.	Title	Length
1.	"They Call Me Leaves"	2:16
2.	"It's Hard Luck Being Me"	4:05
3.	"The All Good People"	3:01
4.	"Rachel Carson"	2:11
5.	"Calvin Grove"	2:23
6.	"Two Birds"	2:34
