= Wolfie =

American musical group

Wolfie was an indie rock band from Champaign, Illinois. The band was active from 1996 to 2001 and toured nationally. They released three albums, an EP, and some singles before dissolving.

Members went on to form The Like Young, Beaujolais, The National Splits, The New Constitution, and Mathlete, and Wolfie members Joe and Amanda Ziemba also had a side project, Busytoby.

== Discography ==
- Necessary Sailing (CS) – Self Released – 1997
- Don't Turn It Off (7") – Grand Theft Autumn – 1997
- Mock House (7") – Mud Records – 1998
- Awful Mess Mystery (CD/LP) – Mud Records – 1999
- You're Lucky I'm Skinny (7") – Parasol Records – 1999
- Heavy Lady (7") – Kittridge Records – 1999
- Wolfie and the Coat and Hat (CD) – Kindercore Records – 2000
- Split w/ Kincaid (7") – Kindercore Records – 2000
- Where's Wolfie? (CD/LP) – Parasol Records – 2000
- Tall Dark Hill (CD/LP) – March Records – 2001
- 4-Track Rarities (MP3) – Self Released – 2003
