= Hit Maker!: Burt Bacharach Plays the Burt Bacharach Hits =

Hit Maker!

Studio album by Burt Bacharach
- Released: c. April 1965
- Genre: Easy listening
- Length: 34:07
- Label: Kapp
- Producer: Burt Bacharach

Burt Bacharach chronology
Hit Maker! (1965)	What's New Pussycat? (1965)

Hit Maker!: Burt Bacharach Plays the Burt Bacharach Hits is the debut album by the American composer Burt Bacharach. The album was recorded in London, with uncredited vocals by the Breakaways, and the musicians included Jimmy Page, John Paul Jones, Big Jim Sullivan, and members of the Ted Heath band.

Kapp Records first released the album around April 1965. That October, the label reissued the album as The Man!, adding "What's New Pussycat?" and "My Little Red Book" to the track listing. In 1969, the label reissued the album again, re-titling it Burt Bacharach Plays His Hits. This reissue, with a woman on a red cover, featured in Austin Powers: International Man of Mystery.

== Track listing ==
All tracks composed by Burt Bacharach and Hal David.

Side one

1. "Don't Make Me Over" – 2:57
2. "Walk On By" – 2:52
3. "Don't Go Breaking My Heart" – 2:26
4. "Blue On Blue" – 2:01
5. "The Last One to Be Loved" – 3:27
6. "(There's) Always Something There to Remind Me" – 2:58

Side two

1. "Twenty Four Hours from Tulsa" – 2:34
2. "Trains and Boats and Planes" – 2:43
3. "Wives and Lovers" – 2:50
4. "Saturday Sunshine" – 2:10
5. "A House Is Not a Home" – 3:31
6. "Anyone Who Had a Heart" – 3:30

== Sources ==
- Dominic, Serene (2003). Burt Bacharach: Song by Song: The Ultimate Burt Bacharach Reference for Fans, Serious Record Collectors, and Music Critics. New York City: Schirmer Trade Books. ISBN 978-0-8256-7280-4.
