= Tall Dark Hill =

Studio album by Wolfie
- Released: 2001
- Genre: indie rock
- Label: March Records

Wolfie chronology
Wolfie and the Coat and Hat (2000)	Tall Dark Hill (2001)

Professional ratings
Review scores
Source	Rating
Allmusic	4/5 stars
Pitchfork	2.1/10
Popmatters	(favourable)

Tall Dark Hill was the final album by indie rock band Wolfie. It was released in 2001 by March Records.

== Track listing ==
1. "What I Want From the World"
2. "A Checkered Begonia"
3. "Waiting For the Night to End"
4. "Everybody Knows How to Cry"
5. "Gwendolyn"
6. "Crab and the Beach"
7. "Living Island Is Real"
8. "Slip of a Shingle"
9. "You Are a Woman"
10. "Happy State of Mr. Bubbins"
