= Small Factory =

American indie rock band (1991-1995)

- Origin: Providence, Rhode Island, U.S.
- Genres: Indie rock Indie pop
- Years active: 1991 – 1995
- Labels: Vernon Yard, spinART, Pop Narcotic
- Members: Alex Kemp; Dave Auchenbach; Phoebe Summersquash

Small Factory was an American indie rock band formed in 1991 and based in Providence, Rhode Island. The group was regarded as an exemplar of 1990s indie rock although they never achieved great success or influence. They were especially noted for the exuberance and charming banter of their live shows. The band broke up in 1995, and guitarist Dave Auchenbach formed Flora Street, while the other two members continued working together as The Godrays. Drummer Phoebe Summersquash later voiced a character on the TV series Downtown and appeared in Sarah Silverman's 2005 film Jesus Is Magic. Bassist Alex Kemp moved to Chicago and formed the band Assassins with Joe Cassidy, Aaron Miller, Merritt Lear and David Golitko. The Assassins signed with the major label Arista Records, but their debut album was ultimately never released, because the label's president, L.A. Reid, was fired and its holding company, BMG, briefly closed the label.

Auchenbach later engineered for the seminal Providence noise rock band Lightning Bolt.

Small Factory played a short series of reunion concerts in New York and Providence in April 2012.

== Members ==
- Alex Kemp - bass, vocals
- Dave Auchenbach - guitar, vocals
- Phoebe Summersquash - drums, vocals

== Discography ==
=== LPs ===
- The Industrial Evolution (1991 - Pop Narcotic)
- I Do Not Love You (1993 - spinART)
- For If You Cannot Fly (1994 - Vernon Yard)

=== Singles ===
- Suggestions (1991 - 7")
- What To Want (1992 - 7")
- August (1993 - split with Tsunami - If You Hurt Me" Simple Machines (appeared later on Working Holiday! (1994))
- So What About Love (1993 - 7")
- Lose Your Way (1994 - 7")
- The Last Time That We Talked (1994 - 7")

=== Appearances ===
- ...One Last Kiss (1992 - "Hey Lucille")
- Something Pretty Beautiful (1993 - "Hopefully")
- Why Do You Think They Call It Pop - The Pop Narcotic Compilation (1994 - "Yeah")

=== Compilations ===
- Industrial Evolution (1996) Pop Narcotic (compilation of singles and miscellany)
