= Libby Titus =

American singer (1947–2024)

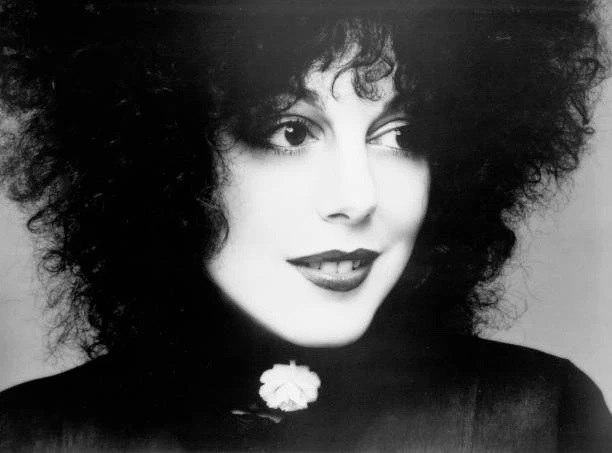
- Titus in 1977

Background information
- Born: Elizabeth Jurist; July 6, 1947; Woodstock, New York, U.S.
- Died: October 13, 2024 (aged 77)
- Genres: Pop, folk
- Occupations: Singer, songwriter
- Instrument: Vocals
- Years active: 1968–2024
- Spouses: Barry Titus (m. 1966; div. 1968) Donald Fagen (m. 1993)
- Partner: Levon Helm (1969–1978)

Elizabeth Titus (nee Jurist; July 6, 1947 – October 13, 2024) was an American singer and songwriter.

== Early life ==
Titus was born in Woodstock, New York, on July 6, 1947. Her studies at Bard College in Annandale-on-Hudson, New York, were cut short by pregnancy and marriage at the age of 21.

== Career ==
In 1968, Titus released Libby Titus, an album of folk-rock and pop music covers, on Hot Biscuit. She continued her career, providing backing vocals for Martin Mull's debut album Martin Mull (1972), among others. At the same time she was developing her songwriting skills.

Her second album, confusingly also called Libby Titus, had four high-profile producers, Phil Ramone, Robbie Robertson, Paul Simon, and Carly Simon; the last also contributed to the songwriting. The album was released by Columbia Records in 1977. It contained four songs co-written by Titus, including the one for which she is best known, "Love Has No Pride", which she wrote with Eric Kaz. It had already been recorded several times – most notably by Bonnie Raitt on Give It Up (1972), Linda Ronstadt on Don't Cry Now (1973), and Tracy Nelson on "Tracy Nelson" (1974), as well as Daryl Braithwaite, whose version was a top 5 hit in Australia in early 1977.

In the late 1970s, Titus collaborated with Burt Bacharach. They wrote at least five songs together, two of them ("Riverboat" and "I Live in the Woods") appearing on Bacharach's album Woman, and one ("In Tune") on his soundtrack for the film Together? (Amo non amo), both released in 1979. Titus also sang "Riverboat" and "In Tune" on these recordings. Carly Simon's 1979 album Spy included "Love You By Heart", a song Simon wrote with Titus and Jacob Brackman. Titus later wrote "The Sailor and the Mermaid" with Brackman and sang it with Dr. John on the Sesame Street album In Harmony (1980).

Titus and Dr. John wrote the music for Robert Frank's short film Energy and How to Get It (1981), and performed some of it on screen. As an actor, Titus had small parts in Mike Nichols's Heartburn (1986) and Penny Marshall's Awakenings (1990), in which she appeared as a club singer.

Titus still performed occasionally at venues around New York in the mid-1980s. Never a powerful singer, she was admired at this stage of her career for her "feeling for style, especially in jazzier numbers" and her "appealingly sultry insouciance". In the second half of the 1980s, Titus began producing "rock-and-roll musicales featuring well-known musicians ... in New York restaurants and clubs". She later recalled that her "horrid little evenings" started "at this little Italian restaurant on Thirty-ninth Street that had room for thirty people. One night it would be, say, Dr. John plus Carly Simon, and it was by invitation only."

These sessions led to the "informal concert" at the Lone Star Roadhouse on September 20, 1989 featuring Dr. John, Donald Fagen, Phoebe Snow, Jevetta Steele, and Bonnie Raitt that gave birth to the New York Rock and Soul Revue, which Titus produced with Fagen until the beginning of 1992. Fagen credits Titus with rekindling his interest in live performance, on which he had turned his back in 1974. The Rock and Soul Revue also brought Walter Becker to New York, and so played a part in the 1993 reformation of Steely Dan, which Fagen and Becker had put on hold while Becker recovered from heroin addiction in 1981.

Titus went on to write songs with Fagen, including "Florida Room" on Kamakiriad (1993). In 1996, Pony Canyon Records anthologised three previously unissued songs that Titus recorded for Bearsville in 1971, two by Eric Kaz and one by Kaz and Titus. Other recordings from this period remain unissued.

== Tributes and depictions ==
Titus was described as "glamorous and compelling" and a "formidable singer-scenester". Her large personality prompted several musical tributes. She is the subject of Carly Simon's song "Libby" from the album Another Passenger (1976), to which Titus also contributed vocals. She inspired Dr. John's piano composition "Pretty Libby" from the 1983 album The Brightest Smile in Town. Singer-songwriter Wendy Waldman wrote about their friendship in "Long Hot Summer Nights" on the album Strange Company (1978). "The Great Pagoda of Funn", from Donald Fagen's 2006 Morph the Cat album, "rhapsodizes on Fagen’s marriage to songwriter Libby Titus".

== Personal life ==
Titus's mother, Julia Irene Jurist née Mooney (December 29, 1911 – January 27, 1989), was an Earl Carroll dancer. In 1966, Titus married novelist Barry Titus (born 1938), grandson of Helena Rubinstein (1870–1965); they separated in 1968. The couple had a son, writer Ezra Titus (July 23, 1966 – July 30, 2009).

From 1969 and through much of the 1970s, Titus's partner was musician Levon Helm (1940–2012). Their daughter is singer Amy Helm (born December 3, 1970).

In 1987, Titus met musician Donald Fagen (born 1948), a contemporary at Bard College who remembered his sighting of her "from a distance" on campus two decades earlier. They married in 1993.

On January 4, 2016, Titus was reported to have sustained injuries after Fagen allegedly shoved her against a marble window frame at their Upper East Side apartment. Titus informed the New York Post that she was divorcing her husband. The two later reconciled. Following the alleged event, a statement was released by Fagen and Titus: “Despite misleading reports in the press, we’re happily married. Now, in our 23rd year of marriage, we’re looking forward to many, many more."

Titus died October 13, 2024, at age 77.
