= Working Holiday! =

Compilation album
- Released: 12 December 1994
- Recorded: 1992–1993 (disc one) and 1994 (disc two)
- Genre: Indie rock
- Language: English
- Label: Simple Machines
- Compiler: Jenny Toomey, Kristin Thomson

Professional ratings
Review scores
Source	Rating
Allmusic	4/5 stars

Working Holiday! is a compilation album released on the Simple Machines label in 1994. It is a collection of tracks by American indie bands which were originally released on a series of 12 7" singles by Simple Machines as part of the Working Holiday monthly record club starting in December 1992. Each song was intended to commemorate a holiday in the month it was released. Subscribers to the record club were also sent a calendar showing the holidays and a specially made 7" single-carrying box.

A limited edition of the Working Holiday! album contained a second disc of live performances from a three-day live music festival held in January 1994 at The Black Cat in Washington D.C. to celebrate the completion of the Working Holiday series. The 20-page CD booklet with all album editions contains a detailed and illustrated account of the record club project and the live music festival.

== Track listing ==
Disc 1 - 7"s on Holiday!

1. 11:59 It's January - Scrawl
2. Tin Foil Star - Versus
3. Abraham Lincoln - Lungfish
4. James Brown - The Tinklers
5. Ides - Codeine
6. Working Holiday - The Coctails
7. Roll Away the Stone - Eggs
8. Christmas Trees Everywhere - Jonny Cohen
9. Saints Above - Veronica Lake
10. Where Is Our Reason - My Dad Is Dead
11. Kiss Me - Rastro!
12. Another Child Bride - Nothing Painted Blue
13. Indie - Lois
14. If You Hurt Me - Small Factory
15. Kidding on the Square - Tsunami
16. Falk - Jawbox
17. Back to School - Crackerbash
18. Under the Ground - Grifters
19. Coalmine #666 - Crain
20. A Penny for the Guy - Pitchblende
21. Night of the Chill Blue - Superchunk
22. Winter's Come - Caterpillar

Disc 2 - Live tracks from the Working Holiday Weekend with MC Jason Noble

1. Hello!
2. Big Puffy Girl Handwriting - Danielle Howle
3. Fun Fun Fun in the Sun Sun Sun - The Tinklers
4. Not Coe - David Greenberger
5. Whoopsy Daisy - The Coctails
6. Broken Heart of a Neutron Star - Crain
7. Flax - Pitchblende
8. Why am I so tired all the time? - Eggs
9. Might - Archers of Loaf
10. From the Curve - Superchunk
11. Newspaper - Tsunami
12. Rubberman - Jonny Cohen
13. The Girl with the Carrot Skin - Bricks
14. Lady Putney - Caterpillar
15. Big Things, Little Things - Rodan
16. Sleeping through the Jane Pratt Show - Franklin Bruno
17. Hacienda - Versus

Artwork by Archer Prewitt. Disc 2 recorded January 7, 8, 9 1994 at The Black Cat by Bob Weston, Geoff Turner and Charles Bennington.
