= Amy Allison =

American singer-songwriter

Amy Allison is an American country music artist and the daughter of jazz-blues musician Mose Allison. She became interested in country music as a kid growing up on Long Island, and first began making music as the lead singer of Amy Allison and the Maudlins. She then joined Ryan Hedgecock to form the country duo Parlor James in 1994, before embarking on a solo career in 1996.

== Early life ==
Allison grew up on Long Island, where she was raised by her parents, Mose and Audre Allison. She is the second of their four children. She has recalled to American Songwriter that, as a child, she felt she was the only one in Long Island who listened to country music. She has cited Billie Holiday and Loretta Lynn as some of her musical influences.

== Musical career ==
Allison began her musical career as the frontwoman of "Amy Allison and the Maudlins", a band that performed at Dixon Place in New York City's East Village. She also teamed up with Ryan Hedgecock (the founder of country group Lone Justice) to form the musical duo Parlor James in 1994. In 2010, she performed the Buddy Johnson song "This New Situation" as a duet with her father, which appeared on his album "The Way of the World". She has also performed on albums by the Silos, They Might Be Giants, and Mudhoney's album Under a Billion Suns. In 2000, fellow Diesel Only Records artist Laura Cantrell included her cover of Allison's song, "The Whiskey Makes You Sweeter," which originally appeared on the Maudlin Years, on her album Not the Tremblin' Kind. Allison later became well known in the United Kingdom from her performances opening for Cantrell on tour in 2002. Since then, she co-written tracks on Cantrell's albums No Way There From Here, and "Kitty Wells Dresses: Songs of the Queen of Country Music." In 2014 her song "Her Hair Was Red" was included on Emmylou Harris and Rodney Crowell's album "The Traveling Kind" produced by Joe Henry.

=== Solo career ===
Allison released her solo debut album, The Maudlin Years, in 1996 on Koch Records. It compiled songs she recorded with the Maudlins, as well as some songs she had originally recorded as demos. Elvis Costello later ranked it as one of his "500 essential albums" in Vanity Fair. She followed it up with 2001's Sad Girl, which was described by Peter Margasak as "an elegant, detailed mix of pedal-steel-soaked country and blue-eyed soul". Her next three albums were No Frills Friend (2003), Everything and Nothing Too (2006), and Sheffield Streets (2009). In 2011, Allison released a duet album with David Scott of the Pearlfishers, entitled Turn Like the World Does. In 2021 Allison completed her latest collection of songs, Pop Tunes and the Setting Sun, with tracks produced by Don Heffington, Lee Feldman and David Scott.

== Reception ==
Erik Hage is Allmusic described Allison as: "..far from any kind of spotlight she has continued to carve out a career as an extraordinary songwriter, and singular performer". Allison's voice has often been described by critics as nasal and high-pitched, and as an "acquired taste" that seems off-putting at first but becomes more attractive after repeated listens, or which may drive some listeners away entirely on its own. Her voice has also led critics to compare her to a wide variety of well-known country artists, including Neil Young, Jimmie Dale Gilmore, Iris Dement, and "a less urbane Victoria Williams." Jad Fair has described her as one of his favorite songwriters.

Many critics have also noted that Allison's music often focuses on very depressing topics. In response to critics making this observation, Allison said, "Maybe I do tend to concentrate on the more miserable aspects of life in my work, but it's a thrill when you have a good idea for a song, and you're doing it, and communicating. I have really good experiences performing live, with people really responding. And my songs always include humor."

Critics' comparisons of Allison's music to that of her father have varied. Mark Keresman noted that while Allison's music is a different genre than her father's, they nevertheless share "a similar succinctness, wry humor, and keen eye for the perils of the human condition." Billboard also highlighted the shared succinctness of her and her father's music in its review of the Maudlin Years.

== Discography ==
- The Maudlin Years (Koch, 1996)
- Sad Girl (Glitterhouse/Diesel Only, 2001)
- No Frills Friend (Diesel Only, 2003)
- Everything and Nothing Too (Shoeshine, 2006)
- Sheffield Streets (Urban Myth, 2009)
- (with David Scott) Turn Like The World Does (My Dark Star, 2012)
- Pop Tunes and the Setting Sun (2021)
