= The Invisible Light: Acoustic Space =

Studio album by Jay Bellerose, T Bone Burnett, and Keefus Ciancia
- Released: April 12, 2019
- Genre: Experimental music
- Length: 44:08
- Label: Verve Forecast

T Bone Burnett chronology
The True False Identity (2008)	The Invisible Light: Acoustic Space (2019)	The Invisible Light: Spells (2022)

The Invisible Light: Acoustic Space is a 2019 studio album by Jay Bellerose, T Bone Burnett, and Keefus Ciancia, released by Verve Forecast.

== Recording ==
The album is an experimental departure from the roots rock that Burnett typically performs. The electronic backing tracks include spoken word pieces on top, inspired by Beat poetry. The album is the first in a planned trilogy about technology and its impact on humanity. The recordings accompany a 5,000-line poem that Burnett has been writing for years on the theme of humanity's ability to become deluded due to technology. The original inspiration was a nightmare Burnett had decades prior where he was in an Episcopalian church and saw men in dark suits who were cutting off the right hands of the masses and inserting electronic tracking devices in their place. Around 2008, he was reminded of the dream with the proliferation of smartphones and began to write the poem to express his concerns about technology.

== Reception ==
Andy Crump of Paste gave the album eight out of 10, emphasizing the dark tone of the lyrics and summing up, "Maybe not being afraid is enough. Maybe being there is enough. Maybe Burnett's advisements have come too late. If so, they're at least a marvel to listen to." In American Songwriter, Hal Horowitz gave the album a three out of five, criticizing the lack of focus and ending his review, "The Invisible Light is meant to be disruptive, make you think, react and reflect on how our lives have been changed, not for the better, with the technological boom from which there seems to be no slowing down... Proceed with caution." Thom Jurek of AllMusic gave the album 3.5 out of five stars, calling the release, "outrageously transgressive—even for Burnett—creative, labyrinthine, and assertive".

== Track listing ==
All songs written by Jay Bellerose, T Bone Burnett, and Keefus Ciancia

1. "High John" – 9:00
2. "A Man Without a Country (All Data Are Compromised)" – 8:12
3. "To Beat the Devil" – 8:09
4. "Anti Cyclone" – 6:31
5. "The Secret in Their Eyes" – 5:53
6. "Being There" – 6:11
7. "Itopia Chant" – 0:12
