= Jeremy Tepper =

American journalist and record industry executive (1963–2024)

Jeremy Evan Tepper (November 18, 1963 – June 14, 2024) was an American musician, journalist, and record industry executive. The former frontman of the band World Famous Blue Jays, he founded the record label Diesel Only Records in 1990, along with Jay Sherman-Godfrey and Albert Caiati. Along with Caiati, Tepper subsequently became the "head honcho" of Diesel Only. He was also the managing editor of the magazine Vending Times prior to 1992, and later became the publisher and editor-in-chief of the jukebox industry trade journal Street Beat. Prior to becoming format manager for Sirius Satellite Radio's Outlaw Country channel in 2004, he had also worked for CDuctive and eMusic.com, and had served as the editor of the Journal of Country Music and as a country music critic for Pulse!.

== Personal life ==
Tepper was born in Poughkeepsie, New York. He graduated from New York University. His father, Noel Tepper, was a lawyer in Poughkeepsie, New York, and his mother, Elly Tepper, was a third-grade teacher at Keolu Elementary School in Kailua, Honolulu County, Hawaii. In 1997, he married Laura Cantrell. With Cantrell, he had a daughter named Bella. He died after a heart attack on June 14, 2024, at the age of 60.
