= The Maudlin Years =

Studio album by Amy Allison
- Released: 1996
- Genre: Country
- Producer: Jordan Chassan

Amy Allison chronology
The Maudlin Years (1996)	Sad Girl (2001)

The Maudlin Years is a 1996 album by country artist Amy Allison. It compiled songs she recorded with a group called "the Maudlins", as well as some of her solo songs she had originally recorded as demos. Elvis Costello later ranked it as one of his "500 essential albums" in Vanity Fair.

== Track listing ==
1. Cheaters World - 3:14
2. Hate at First Sight - 3:06
3. The Whiskey Makes You Sweeter - 4:40
4. Put it in a Box - 2:06
5. Garden State Mall - 3:41
6. Another Day to Cry - 3:15
7. You Just Don't Know What It's Like - 4:08
8. This Misery - 2:43
9. Everybody Ought To Know - 2:20
10. Holding The Baby - 2:41
11. My World Ain't So Blue - 2:55
12. Walking To The End Of The World - 4:38
13. Shady Streets - 3:25
