= Humming by the Flowered Vine =

Studio album by Laura Cantrell
- Released: June 21, 2005
- Recorded: 2005
- Genre: Country
- Length: 39:55
- Label: Matador
- Producer: JD Foster

Laura Cantrell chronology
| When the Roses Bloom Again (2002) | Humming by the Flowered Vine (2005) | Trains and Boats and Planes (2008) |

Professional ratings
Aggregate scores
| Source | Rating |
|---|---|
| Metacritic | 80/100 |
Review scores
| Source | Rating |
| AllMusic | 4.5/5 stars |
| Blender | 3/5 stars |
| Entertainment Weekly | A− |
| Pitchfork | 7.6/10 |
| PopMatters | 8/10 |
| Q | 3.5/5 stars |
| Rolling Stone | 3.5/5 stars |
| Stylus | A− |
| Uncut | 8/10 |
| Under the Radar | 7/10 |

Humming by the Flowered Vine is the third album by Laura Cantrell, originally released in 2005. This album was chosen as one of Amazon.com's Top 100 Editor's Picks of 2005. The song "Bees" is dedicated to the memory of John Peel, who was a great supporter of the artist.

== Track listing ==
All tracks composed by Laura Cantrell; except where noted.

1. "14th Street" (Emily Spray) – 3:19
2. "What You Said" (Jenifer Jackson) – 2:55
3. "And Still" (Dave Schramm) – 3:59
4. "Khaki & Corduroy" – 4:30
5. "Letters" (Lucinda Williams) – 4:54
6. "California Rose" – 2:54
7. "Wishful Thinking" (Wynn Stewart) – 2:55
8. "Poor Ellen Smith" (Traditional; arranged by Laura Cantrell) – 4:02
9. "Bees" (Laura Cantrell, Jay Sherman-Godfrey) – 4:12
10. "Old Downtown" – 6:12

== Personnel ==
- Laura Cantrell - vocals, acoustic guitar
- Dave Schramm
- Joey Burns
- John Convertino
- Kenny Kosek
- Mark Spencer
- Amy Helm
- Paul Niehaus
- Steve Goulding
- Ted Reichman
- Mary Lee Kortes
- Jon Graboff
- Jeremy Chatzky
- Fiona McBain
- Patrick Matera
- JD Foster
