= Awful Mess Mystery =

Studio album by Wolfie
- Released: 1998
- Genre: indie rock
- Label: Mud Records

Wolfie chronology
Awful Mess Mystery (1998)	Where's Wolfie? (1999)

Professional ratings
Review scores
Source	Rating
AllMusic	4/5 stars

Awful Mess Mystery is the debut album by indie rock band Wolfie, released in 1998 via Mud Records. In a 2005 article on indie pop, Pitchfork Media's Nitsuh Abebe referred to it as "an insanely good record that hardly anyone likes" and "one of the best albums of the nineties."

== Track listing ==
1. "I Know I Know I Know"
2. "Mockhouse"
3. "Hey It's Finally Yay"
4. "Yeah Yeah You"
5. "Subroutine The Reward"
6. "Ikat Me"
7. "Lazy Weekend, Stormy Season"
8. "Getting The Reach That I Need"
9. "Live Saver Socks"
10. "Everybody Ought To Know"
11. "I Gotta, U Gotta"
12. "Iron Orange, Iron Blue"
13. "Want To Practice (You Do)"
