= Burt Bacharach =

American composer and songwriter (1928–2023)

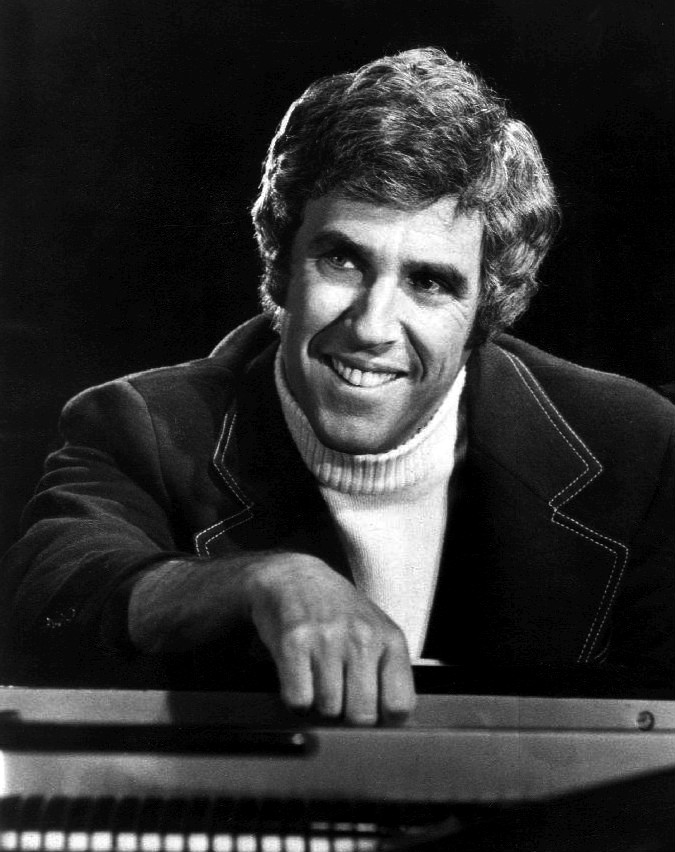
- Bacharach in 1972

Background information
- Born: Burt Freeman Bacharach; May 12, 1928; Kansas City, Missouri, U.S.
- Died: February 8, 2023 (aged 94) Los Angeles, California, U.S.
- Genres: Orchestral pop; easy listening; lounge pop
- Occupations: Composer; songwriter; record producer; pianist; singer; conductor
- Instruments: Keyboards; vocals
- Years active: 1950–2023
- Labels: Kapp; A&M; DJM; Varèse Sarabande; Columbia
- Spouses: Paula Stewart (m. 1953; div. 1958); Angie Dickinson (m. 1965; div. 1981); Carole Bayer Sager (m. 1982; div. 1991); Jane Hansen (m. 1993)
- Website: burtbacharachofficial.com

Burt Freeman Bacharach (/ˈbækəræk/ BAK-ə-rak; May 12, 1928 – February 8, 2023) was an American composer, songwriter, record producer, and pianist, widely regarded as one of the most important and influential figures of 20th-century popular music. A significant figure in orchestral pop and easy listening, he composed hundreds of songs, many in collaboration with lyricist Hal David, and arranged, conducted, and produced much of his recorded output. His music often contained atypical chord progressions and time signature changes, influenced by his background in jazz, and uncommon selections of instruments for small orchestras.

Bacharach and David formed their partnership in 1956 and had their first major hits with Marty Robbins' "The Story of My Life" (1957) and Perry Como's "Magic Moments" (1958). Most of their songs were tailored for Dionne Warwick from 1961 to 1972. Beginning with Jerry Butler's "Make It Easy on Yourself" (1962), Bacharach fully directed the recordings of his songs and, following the success of these collaborations, co-authored hits for singers such as Gene Pitney, Cilla Black, Dusty Springfield, Tom Jones and B. J. Thomas. He expanded into film and stage work with songs and scores for What's New Pussycat? (1965), Butch Cassidy and the Sundance Kid (1968), and the Broadway musical Promises, Promises (1968). After the commercial failure of Lost Horizon (1973), his partnership with David ended, and his collaboration with Warwick was interrupted by lawsuits. He later returned to prominence through work with Carole Bayer Sager and Elvis Costello.

Over a thousand musicians have recorded Bacharach's songs and their recordings have featured in the soundtracks of numerous major feature films. He received six Grammy Awards, three Academy Awards, and one Emmy Award, and his work informed the development of later music styles such as sunshine pop/soft rock, chamber pop, and Shibuya-kei. (Note: Attributed to multiple references:) In total, he composed fifty-two U.S. Top 40 hits between 1957 and 1987, including six chart-toppers: "This Guy's in Love with You" (Herb Alpert, 1968), "Raindrops Keep Fallin' on My Head" (Thomas, 1969), "(They Long to Be) Close to You" (the Carpenters, 1970), "Arthur's Theme (Best That You Can Do)" (Christopher Cross, 1981), "That's What Friends Are For" (Warwick, 1986), and "On My Own" (Bayer Sager, 1986). In 2012, Bacharach and David were the first songwriting team to receive the Library of Congress Gershwin Prize for Popular Song. They were ranked at number 32 on Rolling Stone's 2015 list of the "100 Greatest Songwriters of All Time".

== Early life and education ==
Bacharach was born in Kansas City, Missouri, and grew up in Forest Hills, Queens, New York City, graduating from Forest Hills High School in 1946. He was the son of Irma M. (née Freeman) and Mark Bertram "Bert" Bacharach, a well-known syndicated newspaper columnist. His mother was an amateur painter and songwriter and encouraged Bacharach to practice piano, drums and cello during his childhood. His family was Jewish, but he said that they did not practice or give much attention to Judaism. "But the kids I knew were Catholic," he added. "I was Jewish, but I didn't want anybody to know about it."

Bacharach showed a keen interest in jazz as a teenager, disliking his classical piano lessons, and often used a fake ID to gain admission into 52nd Street nightclubs. He got to hear bebop musicians such as Dizzy Gillespie and Charlie Parker, whose style influenced his songwriting.

Bacharach studied music (Associate of Music, 1948) at McGill University in Montreal, under Helmut Blume, at the Mannes School of Music in New York City, and at the Music Academy of the West in Montecito, California. During this period he studied a range of music, including jazz, whose sophisticated harmony is a distinctive feature of many of his compositions. His composition teachers included Darius Milhaud, Henry Cowell, and Bohuslav Martinů. Bacharach cited Milhaud, under whose guidance he wrote a "Sonatina for Violin, Oboe and Piano", as his greatest influence.

== Career ==
=== 1950s ===
Bacharach was drafted into the U.S. Army in the late 1940s and served for two years. He was stationed in Germany and played piano in officers' clubs there, and at Fort Dix and Governors Island. During this time, he arranged and played music for dance bands.

Bacharach met the popular singer Vic Damone while they were both serving in the army in Germany. Following his discharge, Bacharach spent the next three years as a pianist and conductor for Damone, who recalled, "Burt was clearly bound to go out on his own. He was an exceptionally talented, classically trained pianist, with very clear ideas on the musicality of songs, how they should be played, and what they should sound like. I appreciated his musical gifts." He later worked in a similar capacity for various other singers, including Polly Bergen, Steve Lawrence, the Ames Brothers, and Paula Stewart (who became his first wife). When he was unable to find better jobs, Bacharach worked at resorts in the Catskill Mountains of New York, where he accompanied singers such as Joel Grey.

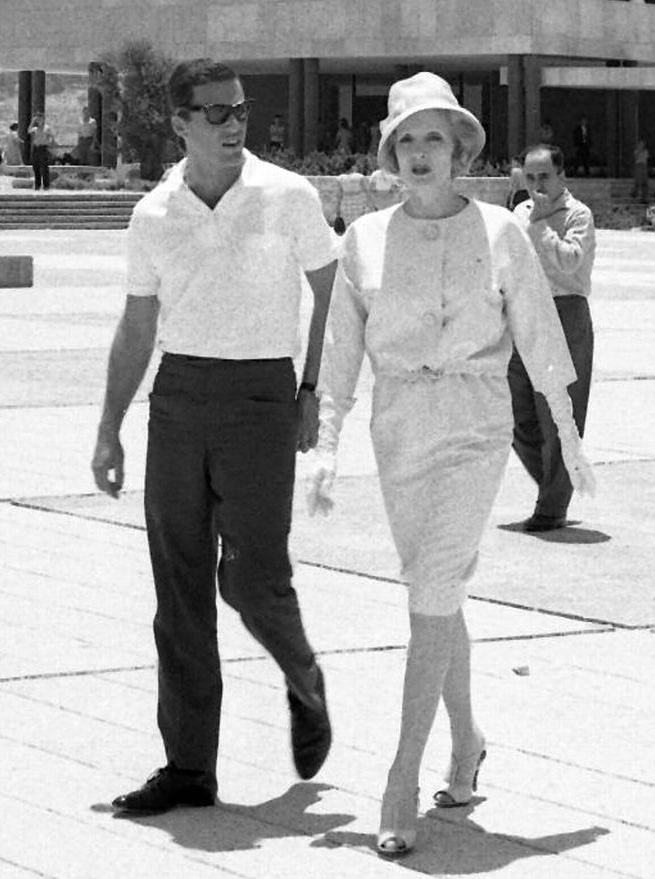
Bacharach with Marlene Dietrich in Jerusalem, 1960

In 1956, at the age of 28, Bacharach's productivity increased when composer Peter Matz recommended him to Marlene Dietrich, who needed an arranger and conductor for her nightclub shows. He then became a part-time music director for Dietrich, the actress and singer who had been an international screen star during the golden age of Hollywood. They toured worldwide off and on until the early 1960s. When they were not touring, he wrote songs. As a result of his collaboration with Dietrich, he gained his first major recognition as a conductor and arranger.

In her autobiography, Dietrich wrote that Bacharach particularly loved touring in Russia and Poland, because he thought very highly of the violinists performing there, and appreciated the public's reaction. According to Dietrich, he also liked Edinburgh and Paris, along with the Scandinavian countries, and "he also felt at home in Israel", she wrote, "where music was similarly much revered". In the early 1960s, after about five years with Dietrich, their working relationship ceased, with Bacharach telling Dietrich that he wanted to devote himself full-time to songwriting. She thought of her time with him as "seventh heaven ... As a man, he embodied everything a woman could wish for ... How many such men are there? For me he was the only one."

Also in 1956, Bacharach and lyricist Hal David, who were both working in the Brill Building in New York City for Famous Music, published their first songs as co-writers. The songs published in 1956 included "I Cry More" (featured in the motion picture Don't Knock the Rock), "The Morning Mail", and "Peggy's In The Pantry". The two received a career breakthrough when their song "The Story of My Life" was recorded by Marty Robbins, becoming a No. 1 hit on the Billboard Country Chart in 1957. Soon afterward, "Magic Moments" was recorded by Perry Como for RCA Records, and reached No. 4 on the Most Played by Disc Jockeys chart. These two songs were also the first singles by a songwriting duo to ever reach back-to-back No. 1 in the UK (The British chart-topping "The Story of My Life" version was sung by Michael Holliday). Between 1956 and the dissolution of their partnership in the mid-1970s, Bacharach and David wrote over 230 songs together for the pop market, motion pictures, television, and Broadway.

=== 1960s ===
Despite Bacharach's early success with Hal David, he spent several years in the early 1960s writing songs with several other lyricists in addition to continuing his work with David. During this period, Bacharach found the most success with songs written with lyricist Bob Hilliard, including "Please Stay" (The Drifters, 1961), "Tower of Strength" (Gene McDaniels, 1961), "Any Day Now (My Wild Beautiful Bird)" (Chuck Jackson, 1962), and "Mexican Divorce" (The Drifters, 1962). In 1961, Bacharach was credited as arranger and producer, for the first time on both label and sleeve, for the song "Three Wheels on My Wagon", written jointly with Hilliard for Dick Van Dyke.

Bacharach's career received a boost when singer Jerry Butler asked to record "Make It Easy on Yourself" and also wanted him to direct the recording sessions. It became the first time Bacharach managed the entire recording process for one of his own songs.

In 1961 Bacharach discovered singer Dionne Warwick, who was working as a session backup singer at the time. That year the two, along with Dionne's sister Dee Dee Warwick, released the single "Move It on the Backbeat" under the name Burt and the Backbeats. The lyrics for this Bacharach composition were provided by Hal David's brother Mack David.

Bacharach and Hal David were both excited by Warwick's singing and decided to form a production company, Blue JAC Productions, so they could write for Warwick and produce her recordings. Warwick signed with Bacharach and David's new company, and the team subsequently secured a recording contract with Scepter Records for Warwick's recordings. Warwick made her solo recording debut in 1962 with "Don't Make Me Over", which also became her first hit. As business partners, Bacharach and David began writing almost exclusively with each other from 1962 until the dissolution of their partnership in the mid-1970s.

Bacharach and David's partnership with Warwick became one of the most successful teams in popular music history. Over the next 20 years, Warwick's recordings of Bacharach and David songs sold over 12 million copies, with 38 singles making the charts and 22 in the Top 40. Among the hits were "Walk On By", "Anyone Who Had a Heart", "Alfie", "I Say a Little Prayer", "I'll Never Fall in Love Again", and "Do You Know the Way to San Jose".

Bacharach released his first solo album in 1965 on the Kapp Records label. Hit Maker!: Burt Bacharach Plays the Burt Bacharach Hits was largely ignored in the U.S. but rose to No. 3 on the UK album charts, where his version of "Trains and Boats and Planes" had become a top five single. In 1967, he signed with A&M Records both as an artist and a producer, recording several solo albums (all consisting in a mix of new material and rearrangements of his best-known songs) until 1978.

In addition to having his work recorded by pop and R&B acts, Bacharach's songs were occasionally recorded during these years by jazz and rock acts. The Bacharach/David composition "My Little Red Book", originally recorded by Manfred Mann for the film What's New Pussycat?, was also recorded by the psychedelic rock band Love and released as the band's first single. The Love version of the song went to number 52 on the U.S. Billboard Hot 100 pop singles chart and is considered by some writers to be a 1960s rock classic. In 1968, jazz musician Stan Getz recorded twelve Bacharach and David songs for What the World Needs Now: Stan Getz Plays Burt Bacharach and Hal David. Bacharach expressed delight and surprise for this choice, saying quote, "I've sometimes felt that my songs are restrictive for a jazz artist. I was excited when [Stan] Getz did a whole album of my music". His songs were also adapted by several other jazz artists of the time, such as Grant Green, Wes Montgomery, Bill Evans, and Cal Tjader.

Bacharach also continued to get commissions for film scores, including those for the 1966 heist comedy After the Fox and the 1967 James Bond spy parody Casino Royale. The music for Casino Royale included "The Look of Love", performed by Dusty Springfield, and the instrumental title song, which was a Top 40 single for Herb Alpert and the Tijuana Brass. The soundtrack album is widely considered to be one of the finest engineered vinyl recordings of all time, and is much sought after by audiophile collectors.

Bacharach and David also collaborated with Broadway producer David Merrick on the 1968 musical Promises, Promises, which yielded two hits, including the title tune and "I'll Never Fall in Love Again". Bacharach and David wrote the latter song when the producer realized the play urgently needed another before its opening the next evening. Bacharach, who had just been released from the hospital after contracting pneumonia, was still sick, but worked with David's lyrics to write the song which was performed for the show's opening. It was later recorded by Dionne Warwick and was on the charts for several weeks. Promises, Promises was the second musical created by Bacharach and David who had earlier written the 1966 television musical On the Flip Side for the anthology program ABC Stage 67; a work which starred Ricky Nelson and Joanie Sommers.

Also in 1968, the duo's song "This Guy's in Love with You" was recorded by Herb Alpert, who was best known at the time as a fellow songwriter and a trumpet player as the leader of the Tijuana Brass. The song went on to reach the top spot on the U.S. Billboard Hot 100 pop singles chart later that year, becoming the first No. 1 hit for Alpert and his label, A&M Records.

The year 1969 marked, perhaps, the most successful Bacharach-David collaboration, the Oscar-winning "Raindrops Keep Fallin' on My Head", written for and prominently featured in the acclaimed film Butch Cassidy and the Sundance Kid. The two were also awarded a Grammy for Best Cast album of the year for Promises, Promises; the score was nominated for a Tony Award, as well.

Bacharach and David's other Oscar nominations for Best Song in the latter half of the 1960s were for "The Look of Love", "What's New Pussycat?", and "Alfie".

=== 1970s and 1980s ===
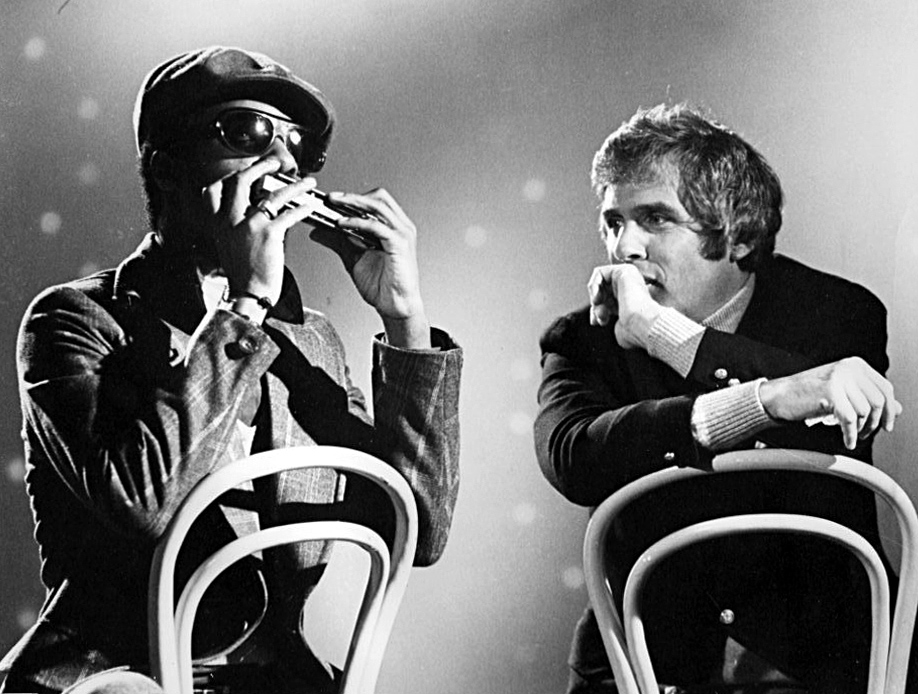
Bacharach with Stevie Wonder in the 1970s

He swings. He jumps. He socks imaginary tennis balls from his conductor's podium. He's a hurricane that knows where it's heading.

— Rex Reed, American film critic

Throughout the late 1960s and early 1970s, Bacharach continued to write and produce for artists, compose for stage, TV, and film, and release his own albums. He enjoyed a great deal of visibility in the public spotlight, appearing frequently on TV and performing live in concert. Between November 1969 and January 1974, Bacharach and his music were the focus of nine U.S. network television specials, including five on NBC, three on ABC, and one on CBS. Newsweek magazine gave him a lengthy cover story entitled "The Music Man 1970".

In 1971, Barbra Streisand appeared on the special Singer Presents Burt Bacharach, where they discussed their careers and favorite songs and performed songs together. The other guests on the television special were dancers Rudolph Nureyev and Bettie de Jong, and singer Tom Jones.

In 1973, Bacharach and David wrote the songs for Lost Horizon, a film-musical remake of the 1937 dramatic adventure film of the same title. A conflict arose between the two songwriters during the film's production, and strained their professional relationship to the point that they stopped working together regularly. As Bacharach explained the situation in his 2013 memoir, he grew dissatisfied with his share of the potential film profits, because, in addition to providing the music for the songs, he was also doing underscore music for the film, which he felt he was not being fairly paid for. Bacharach asked David for a larger share of the profits, and David refused to renegotiate. When the film was released, it was poorly received and lost an estimated $9 million, but by that point, Bacharach was refusing to work on additional projects with David. Dionne Warwick, whose lucrative 1971 Warner Bros. Records contract was based on having Bacharach and David as her production team, sued the songwriters because they could not fulfill the terms of their agreement with her, putting her relationship with Warner Bros. Records in jeopardy. David in turn sued Bacharach for abandoning their legal partnership, and the lawsuits among the three parties took many years to resolve.

Despite the ongoing lawsuits, Bacharach and Warwick reunited in the studio in 1974 to record three new Bacharach songs for Warner Brothers, though the songs remained unreleased until 2013. Bacharach and David also reunited briefly, in 1975, to write and produce Stephanie Mills' second album, For The First Time, released by Motown.

Following the Stephanie Mills album, the Bacharach & David partnership was effectively over, and both songwriters began working with other collaborators. During the 1990s, they briefly reunited on two occasions, in 1993 to write a song for a Warwick album, and in 1999, to write two songs for the soundtrack of the film Isn't She Great. Bacharach eventually expressed regret over his actions during the Lost Horizon production, and wrote in his autobiography:

It was all my fault, and I can't imagine how many great songs I could have written with Hal in the years we were apart. So I now know that on every level, it was a very bad mistake."

Bacharach also suggested in interviews he gave to promote his autobiography that he and David were out of inspiration by the time they stopped working together. Discussing the breakup of their artistic partnership in a 2013 interview with author Mitch Albom, Bacharach said:

That's just vanity and saying 'yeah, I'll write with someone else'. Then the other question is what could we have written if we hadn't split up. I don't know what we would have written. Had we 'run out' a little bit? Had we been depleted and robbed of creativity?

From 1975 to 1980, Bacharach wrote songs with a number of lyricists including Paul Anka, James J. Kavanaugh, Norman Gimbel, Libby Titus, Anthony Newley, and playwright Neil Simon. His solo albums from the late 1970s, including Futures and Woman, failed to yield hits.

By the early 1980s, Bacharach's marriage to Angie Dickinson had ended, but a new partnership with lyricist Carole Bayer Sager proved rewarding, both commercially and personally. The first song they collaborated on was "Where Did the Time Go" by The Pointer Sisters, released as a single in 1980. Bacharach and Bayer Sager co-wrote 11 of the songs on Bayer Sager's 1981 album Sometimes Late at Night, and Bacharach produced the album. Music critic Joe Viglione called the album "the Sgt. Pepper of singer/songwriter recordings" and "the epitome of '70s and '80s adult contemporary....a classic of the genre."

The two married and collaborated on several major hits during the decade, including "Arthur's Theme (Best That You Can Do)" (Christopher Cross), co-written with Christopher Cross and Peter Allen, which won an Academy Award for Best Song; "Heartlight" (Neil Diamond); "Making Love" (Roberta Flack); and "On My Own" (Patti LaBelle with Michael McDonald).

Another of their hits, "That's What Friends Are For" in 1985, reunited Bacharach and Warwick. When asked about their coming together again, she explained:

We realized we were more than just friends. We were family. Time has a way of giving people the opportunity to grow and understand ... Working with Burt is not a bit different from how it used to be. He expects me to deliver and I can. He knows what I'm going to do before I do it, and the same with me. That's how intertwined we've been.

Other artists continued to revive Bacharach's earlier hits in the 1980s and 1990s. Examples included Luther Vandross's recording of "A House Is Not a Home", Naked Eyes' 1983 pop hit version of "(There's) Always Something There to Remind Me", and Ronnie Milsap's 1982 country version of "Any Day Now". Bacharach continued a concert career, appearing at auditoriums throughout the world, often with large orchestras. He occasionally joined Warwick for sold-out concerts in Las Vegas, Los Angeles, and New York City, where they performed at the Rainbow Room in 1996.

=== 1990s and beyond ===
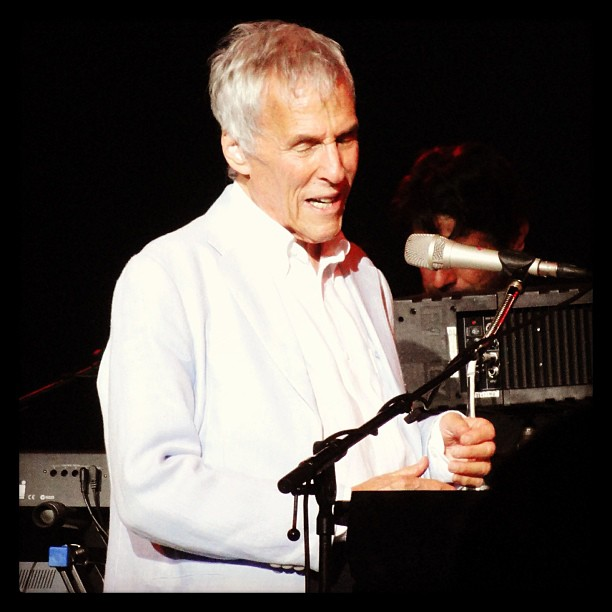
Bacharach performing in 2013

Bacharach's visibility increased in the second half of the 1990s due to his appearances as himself in the Austin Powers films, a U.S. box set release of his music and a new songwriting partnership that produced a Grammy-winning album. Bacharach formed his songwriting partnership with Elvis Costello initially to write one song, "God Give Me Strength", for the 1996 film Grace of My Heart. The film told the story of a fictional 1960s female Brill Building songwriter and was inspired by songwriters like Carole King and Bacharach.

In 1998, Bacharach and Costello released the album Painted from Memory, on which the pair continued to work in the 1960s and 1970s pop style that they used for their initial collaboration. The album's song "I Still Have That Other Girl" won a Grammy for Best Pop Collaboration with Vocals. The duo would later reunite for Costello's 2018 album, Look Now, working on several tracks together. Also in 1998, Rhino Records released a 3-CD box set, The Look of Love, that licensed the original recordings of most of his best-known songs. Music writer Richie Unterberger called the set "the best representation of [Bacharach's] music likely to ever be assembled."

In 2003, he arranged and produced Ronald Isley's album Here I Am, on which Isley sang a program of Bacharach songs mostly drawn from Bacharach's 1960s-era hits. Bacharach's 2005 solo album At This Time was a departure from past works in that Bacharach penned his own lyrics, some of which dealt with political themes. Guest stars on the album included Elvis Costello, Rufus Wainwright, and hip-hop producer Dr. Dre.

In 2008, Bacharach opened the BBC Electric Proms at The Roundhouse in London, performing with the BBC Concert Orchestra accompanied by guest vocalists Adele, Beth Rowley, and Jamie Cullum. The concert was a retrospective look back at his six-decade career. In early 2009, Bacharach worked with Italian soul singer Karima Ammar and produced her debut single "Come In Ogni Ora".

Bacharach's autobiography, Anyone Who Had a Heart, was ghostwritten by Robert Greenfield and published in 2013. It incorporated the (not always positive) recollections of many of his close friends, colleagues and relatives.

In June 2015, Bacharach performed in the UK at the Glastonbury Festival, and a few weeks later appeared on stage at the Menier Chocolate Factory in Southwark, South London, to launch What's It All About? Bacharach Reimagined, a 90-minute live arrangement of his hits.

In 2016, Bacharach, at 88 years old, composed and arranged his first original score in 16 years for the film A Boy Called Po (along with composer Joseph Bauer). The score was released on September 1, 2017. The entire 30-minute score was recorded in just two days at Capitol Studios. The theme song, "Dancing with Your Shadow", was composed by Bacharach, with lyrics by Billy Mann, and performed by Sheryl Crow. After seeing the film, a true story about a child with autism, Bacharach decided he wanted to write a score for it, as well as a theme song, in tribute to his daughter Nikki—who had gone undiagnosed with Asperger syndrome, and who died by suicide because of depression at the age of 40. "It touched me very much", the composer said. "I had gone through this with Nikki. Sometimes you do things that make you feel. It's not about money or rewards."

In 2018, Bacharach released "Live to See Another Day", co-written with Rudy Pérez and featuring the Miami Symphony Orchestra; the song was dedicated to survivors of gun violence in schools, as the proceeds from the release went to the charity Sandy Hook Promise, a non-profit organization founded and led by several family members whose children had been killed in the 2012 Sandy Hook Elementary School shooting.

In July 2020, Bacharach collaborated with songwriter and multi-instrumentalist Daniel Tashian on the EP Blue Umbrella, Bacharach's first new material in 15 years. It earned Bacharach and Tashian a Grammy Award nomination for Best Traditional Pop Vocal Album at the 63rd Annual Grammy Awards.

In March 2023, a collection of Bacharach's collaborations with Elvis Costello, The Songs of Bacharach & Costello, was released. The collection includes 16 tracks from the proposed stage musical Taken From Life.

== Film and television ==
Throughout the 1960s and 1970s, Bacharach was featured in a dozen television musical and variety specials videotaped in the UK for ITC; several were nominated for Emmy Awards for direction (by Dwight Hemion). The guests included artists such as Joel Grey, Dusty Springfield, Dionne Warwick, and Barbra Streisand. Bacharach and David did the score for an original musical for ABC-TV titled On the Flip Side, broadcast on ABC Stage 67, starring Ricky Nelson as a faded pop star trying for a comeback.

In 1969, Harry Betts arranged Bacharach's instrumental composition "Nikki" (named for Bacharach's daughter) into a new theme for the ABC Movie of the Week, a television series that ran on the U.S. network until 1976.

During the 1970s, Bacharach and then-wife Angie Dickinson appeared in several television commercials for Martini & Rossi beverages, and Bacharach even penned a short jingle ("Say Yes") for the spots. He also occasionally appeared on television/variety shows such as The Merv Griffin Show, The Tonight Show Starring Johnny Carson, and others.

In the 1990s and 2000s Bacharach had cameo roles in Hollywood movies, including all three Austin Powers movies, inspired by his score for the 1967 James Bond parody film Casino Royale. Mike Myers said the first film in the series, Austin Powers: International Man of Mystery (1997), was partially inspired by the song "The Look of Love". After hearing the song on the radio, Myers began reminiscing about the 1960s, which helped him conceive the film. Myers later said of Bacharach's appearance in the movie: "It was amazing working with Burt. His song "The Look of Love" was the inspiration for this film. It was like having Gershwin appear in your movie."

Bacharach appeared as a celebrity performer and guest vocal coach for contestants on the television show American Idol during its 2006 season, during which an entire episode was dedicated to his music. In 2008, Bacharach was featured in the BBC Electric Proms at The Roundhouse with the BBC Concert Orchestra. He performed similar shows the same year at the Walt Disney Concert Hall and with the Sydney Symphony.

== Musical style ==
The whole room would come to life with his conducting — the way he would look over at the drummer and with just a flick of his finger, things could happen. Once the groove was happening in the room, forget it; there was nothing like it. And everything, including the strings, responded to the kind of body movement that Burt had. He brings an incredible amount of life to the studio. He's probably one of the most amazing musicians in the world.

— Record producer Phil Ramone

Bacharach's music is characterized by unusual chord progressions, influenced by jazz harmony, with striking syncopated rhythmic patterns, irregular phrasing, frequent modulation, and odd, changing meters. He arranged, conducted, and produced much of his recorded output. Though his style is sometimes called easy listening, he expressed apprehension regarding that label, as some of his frequent collaborators did. According to NJ.com contributor Mark Voger, "It may be easy on the ears, but it's anything but easy. The precise arrangements, the on-a-dime shifts in meter, and the mouthfuls of lyrics required to service all those notes have, over the years, proven challenging to singers and musicians." Bacharach's selection of instruments included flugelhorns, bossa nova sidesticks, breezy flutes, tack piano, molto fortissimo strings, and cooing female voices. According to editors of The Mojo Collection, it led to what became known as the "Bacharach Sound". Bacharach explained:

I didn't want to make the songs the same way as they'd been done, so I'd split vocals and instrumentals and try to make it interesting ... For me, it's about the peaks and valleys of where a record can take you. You can tell a story and be able to be explosive one minute, then get quiet as kind of a satisfying resolution.

While he did not mind singing during live performances, he sought mostly to avoid it on records. When he did sing, he explains, "I [tried] to sing the songs not as a singer, but just interpreting it as a composer and interpreting a great lyric that Hal [David] wrote." When performing in front of live audiences, he often conducted while playing piano, as he did during a televised performance on The Hollywood Palace.

Bacharach wrote fifty-two US Top 40 hits.

== Other business interests ==
Bacharach once owned the Dover House restaurant, which was located across the street from Roosevelt Raceway in Westbury, New York. It was the site of a press conference in which the New York Islanders unveiled their name and logo and introduced Bill Torrey as their first general manager.

== Personal life ==
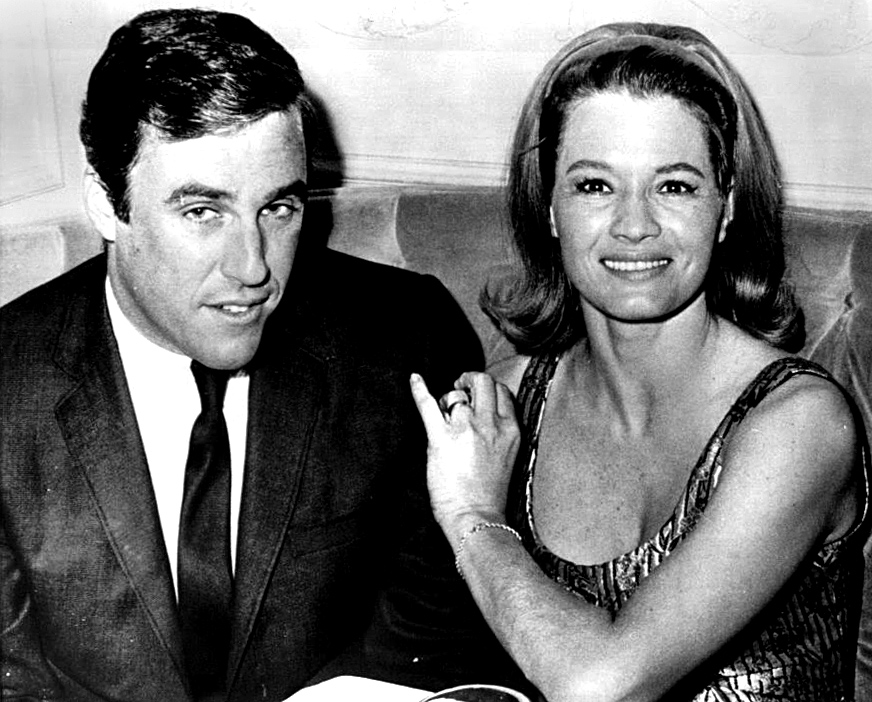
With his second wife, actress Angie Dickinson, in 1965

Bacharach married four times.

- to Paula Stewart for 5 years (1953–1958).
- to actress Angie Dickinson, for 16 years (1965–1981), though they were separated the last five. Dickinson believed Bacharach had affairs. They had one daughter, Lea Nikki Bacharach, who was born prematurely in 1966, weighing 1 lb 10 oz, and then being isolated from human touch for 3 months. She had eyesight problems and Asperger syndrome. She died by suicide in 2007, at age 40, after struggling with depression for many years.
- to lyricist Carole Bayer Sager for 9 years (1982–1991). The duo collaborated on a number of musical pieces and adopted a son, Cristopher Elton Bacharach, in 1985.
- to Jane Hansen, in 1993. They had two children, son Oliver, born the year before their marriage, and daughter Raleigh, born in 1995.

Bacharach died of natural causes at his home in Los Angeles, California, on February 8, 2023, at the age of 94.

== Television and film appearances ==
- An Evening with Marlene Dietrich
- Austin Powers: International Man of Mystery
- Austin Powers: The Spy Who Shagged Me
- Austin Powers in Goldmember
- Marlene Dietrich: Her Own Song
- Nip/Tuck
- The Nanny
- Jake in Progress
- Oasis: Don't Look Back in Anger

== Discography ==
=== Solo albums ===
| Year | Title | Peak chart positions | Role(s) | Awards |
| Year | Title | US 200 | Role(s) | Awards |
|---|---|---|---|---|
| 1965 | Hit Maker!: Burt Bacharach Plays the Burt Bacharach Hits | — | Director (orchestra and chorus), arrangement, producer, songwriter | — |
| 1967 | Reach Out | 96 | Producer, composer, arrangement, conductor, co-writer (Hal David) | Gold (solo, standard), July 21, 1971 |
| 1969 | Make it Easy on Yourself | 51 | Arrangement, producer | Gold (solo, standard), November 13, 1970 |
| 1970 | Butch Cassidy & the Sundance Kid | — | Score, composer, co-writer (Hal David) | Gold (solo, standard), May 22, 1970 |
| 1971 | Burt Bacharach | 18 | Arrangement, conductor, co-producer (Phil Ramone), co-writer (Hal David) | Gold (solo, standard), July 21, 1971 |
| 1973 | Living Together | — | Arrangement, conductor, producer, piano, co-writer, (Hal David) | — |
| 1977 | Futures | — | Producer, keyboard, arrangement | — |
| 1979 | Woman | — | Composed, arrangement, conductor | — |
| 2005 | At This Time | — | Producer, arrangement, conductor, lyrics, music | — |

=== Collaboration projects ===
==== With Elvis Costello ====
- Painted from Memory (1998)

==== With Ronald Isley ====
- Isley Meets Bacharach: Here I Am (2003)

==== With Daniel Tashian ====
- Blue Umbrella (2020)

=== Live albums ===
- Burt Bacharach in Concert (1974)
- One Amazing Night (1998)
- Marlene Dietrich with the Burt Bacharach Orchestra (2007)
- Burt Bacharach: Live at the Sydney Opera House with the Sydney Symphony Orchestra (2008)

=== Soundtracks ===
==== Films ====
- What's New Pussycat? (1965)
- After the Fox (1966)
- Alfie
- Casino Royale (1967)
- Butch Cassidy and the Sundance Kid (1969) (US: Gold)
- Lost Horizon (1973)
- Together? (1979)
- Arthur (1981)
- Night Shift (1982)
- Arthur 2: On the Rocks (1988)
- Isn't She Great (2000)
- A Boy Called Po (2016)

==== TV ====
- On the Flip Side (1967)

=== Theatrical works ===
- Marlene Dietrich (1968): concert – music arranger and conductor
- Promises, Promises (1968): musical – composer (Tony Nomination for Best Musical)
- André DeShield's Haarlem Nocturne (1984): revue – featured songwriter
- The Look of Love (2003): revue – composer
- The Boy from Oz (2003): musical – additional composer
- Some Lovers (2011) – composer with Steven Sater
- My Best Friend's Wedding (2021) – composer with Hal David

=== Compilations ===
- Portrait in Music (1971)
- Portrait in Music Vol. II (1973)
- Burt Bacharach's Greatest Hits (1973)
- The Best of Burt Bacharach (1999)
- The Look of Love: The Burt Bacharach Collection (U.S. edition 1998)
- Motown Salutes Bacharach (2002)
- Blue Note Plays Burt Bacharach (2004)
- The Definitive Burt Bacharach Songbook (2006)
- Burt Bacharach & Friends Gold (2006)
- Colour Collection (2007)
- Magic Moments: The Definitive Burt Bacharach Collection (2008)
- Anyone Who Had a Heart – The Art of the Songwriter (2013)
- The Songs of Bacharach & Costello (2023)

=== Production credits ===
==== For Marlene Dietrich ====
- Live at the Café de Paris (1954)
- Dietrich in Rio (1959)
- Wiedersehen mit Marlene (1960)
- Dietrich in London (1964)
- Мари = Marie–Marie (1964)

==== For Neil Diamond ====
- Heartlight (1982)
- Primitive (1984)
- Headed for the Future (1986)

==== For Dionne Warwick ====
- Reservations for Two (1987)
- Friends Can Be Lovers (1993)

==== For others ====
- Carole Bayer Sager – Sometimes Late at Night (1981)
- Roberta Flack – I'm the One (1982)
- Patti LaBelle – Winner in You (1986)
- Natalie Cole – Everlasting (1987)
- Ray Parker Jr. – After Dark (1987)
- Barbra Streisand – Till I Loved You (1988)
- Aretha Franklin – What You See Is What You Sweat (1991)
- Carly Simon – Christmas Is Almost Here (2002)
- Ronan Keating – When Ronan Met Burt (2011)
- Elvis Costello – Look Now (2018)
