= Pearlfishers (band) =

Glasgow-based rock band

The Pearlfishers are a Scottish, Glasgow-based rock band, fronted by the singer and songwriter David Scott, who have been described by acclaim.ca as "one of Scotland's best-kept musical secrets". Other contributors include drummer Jim Gash, Dee Bahl, Brian McAlpine, Mil Stricevic and Duglas T. Stewart, also of the BMX Bandits. The band's 2007 album, Up With the Larks, was named one of the top albums of 2007 by the Sunday Mail music critic, Billy Sloan. and their 2014 release "Open Up your Colouring Book" drew favourable comparisons to the work of Paul Simon and the Beach Boys.

Scott has been the main songwriter, producer and vocalist of Pearlfishers since their inception. Scott also was a member of BMX Bandits. He has produced recordings and played with a wide range of artists including Amy Allison, Alex Chilton, Yeon Gene Wang, Ricky Ross, Maher Shalal Hash Baz and Bill Wells. Scott also works as a broadcaster on BBC Radio fronting music documentaries and also has contributed music to many theatre productions in Scotland and co-organised all star tribute shows to Brian Wilson, Ennio Morricone and Serge Gainsbourg. David is a Senior Lecturer in the School of Creative and Cultural Industries at the University of the West of Scotland and is the Programme Leader for their MA in Songwriting and Performance.

== Selected discography ==
- Sacred EP (My Dark Star, 1991)
- Hurt EP (My Dark Star, 1991)
- Woodenwire EP (My Dark Star, 1991)
- Saint Francis Songs EP (Iona Gold, 1993)
- Za Za's Garden (Iona Gold, 1993)
- Living in a Foreign Country EP (Iona Gold, 1994)
- The Strange Underworld of the Tall Poppies (Marina, 1997)
- Even on a Sunday Afternoon EP (Marina, 1997)
- Banana Sandwich EP (Marina, 1998)
- The Young Picnickers (Marina, 1999)
- Across The Milky Way (Marina, 2001)
- Sky Meadows (Marina, 2003)
- A Sunflower at Christmas EP (Marina, 2004)
- Up with the Larks (Marina, 2007)
- The Umbrellas of Shibuya 7" vinyl single (Marina, 2007)
- Open Up Your Colouring Book (Marina, 2014)
- Love and Other Hopeless Things (Marina, 2019)
- Making Tapes for Girls (Marina, 2024)
