= Laura Cantrell =

American singer-songwriter (born 1967)

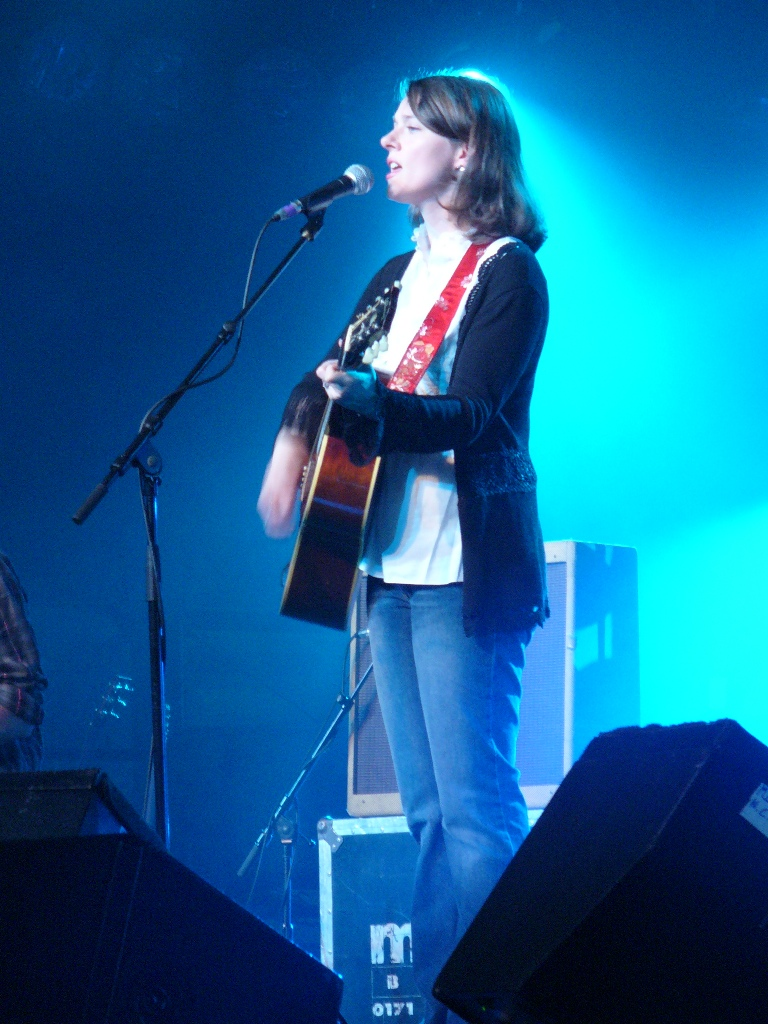

Background information
- Born: Laura Rose Cantrell; July 16, 1967 (age 59); Nashville, Tennessee, U.S.
- Genres: Alt Country, Indie
- Occupations: Songwriter, singer, radio dj
- Instruments: Guitar, piano
- Years active: 1996–present
- Labels: Diesel Only, Shoeshine, Matador
- Website: www.lauracantrell.com

Laura Rose Cantrell (born July 16, 1967) is a country singer-songwriter and DJ from Nashville, Tennessee.

== Biography ==
Cantrell moved to New York City from her native Nashville to study English at Columbia University. She briefly recorded songs with future Superchunk guitarist Mac McCaughan and others in a lo-fi band called Bricks and deejaying on the university's radio station, WKCR, until joining WFMU after her graduation in 1993.

Her singing career began when she was at college, performing with various local groups. She later befriended John Flansburgh of They Might Be Giants, with whom she sings on the band's "The Guitar (The Lion Sleeps Tonight)" (1992). Flansburgh also released her first solo material: an EP on his "Hello CD of the Month Club" in June 1996, which was reissued in 2004 as The Hello Recordings.

Cantrell married Jeremy Tepper, the founder of Diesel Only Records and later programming director of Sirius XM radio station Outlaw Country, in 1997. They have one daughter. Cantrell went on to release all but one of her studio albums on Diesel Only.

Cantrell reached wider recognition in 2000 with her debut album, Not the Tremblin' Kind. The album reached the attention of legendary UK DJ John Peel, who wrote of it, "[It is] my favourite record of the last ten years and possibly my life". She went on to record five sessions for Peel and dedicated her 2005 album, Humming by the Flowered Vine, to his memory.

In the spring of 2011, Cantrell released Kitty Wells Dresses: Songs Of the Queen of Country Music, "a recording she made in honor of one of her heroines, the great Kitty Wells", taking its title from an original song of Cantrell's written in tribute to Wells.

Her 4th album of original material, No Way There From Here, was released in the UK in September 2013, on Shoeshine/ Spit and Polish Records. The release preceded a tour of the UK.

Cantrell's music has been celebrated in the press including features in The New York Times. In recent years, she has been a contributor to The New York Times and VanityFair.com.

Cantrell used to present a weekly country and old-time music radio show on WFMU called The Radio Thrift Shop. Since October 2005 she has only made occasional appearances on the station. In August 2017, she began hosting Dark Horse Radio, a weekly 30-minute program on SiriusXM featuring the music of George Harrison.

In June 2024, Jeremy Tepper, Cantrell's husband of 27 years, died.

== Career outside music ==
In the early part of her career, Cantrell combined her musical activities with a day job as a vice-president in the equity research department of Bank of America. She left this position in 2003. In 2011 she began working as a recruiter for AllianceBernstein.

== Discography ==
=== Albums ===
- Not the Tremblin' Kind (2000)
- When the Roses Bloom Again (2002)
- Humming by the Flowered Vine (2005)
- Kitty Wells Dresses: Songs of the Queen of Country Music (2011) (UK chart peak: No. 138)
- No Way There from Here (2014)
- Just Like a Rose (2023)

=== EPs ===
- Laura Cantrell (1996) (Hello Records 67)
- All the Same to You (2002)
- The Hello Recordings (2004) – Reissue of 1996 EP
- Humming Songs: Acoustic Performances from the Flowered Vine (2006) (download only)
- Trains and Boats and Planes (2008)

=== Other releases ===
- This Is Next Year: A Brooklyn-Based Compilation (2001) – (Arena Rock Recording Co.)
- Ojo (album by Vince Bell) (2018)
