= Outlaw Country (SiriusXM) =

- Broadcast area: United States; Canada
- Frequencies: Sirius XM Radio 60; DISH Network 6060

Programming
- Format: Outlaw country

Ownership
- Owner: Sirius XM Radio

Technical information
- Class: Satellite Radio Station

Links
- Website: SiriusXM: Outlaw Country

Outlaw Country is a Sirius XM Radio channel devoted to outlaw country music, along with various related genres including classic honky tonk, alternative country and roots rock. It is carried on Sirius XM Radio channel 62 and DISH Network channel 6060.

== Programming ==
Launched in May 2004 by Steven Van Zandt, Sirius XM Outlaw Country is "a sanctuary for the freaks, misfits, outcasts, rebels and renegades of country music." In 2010, Outlaw Country became the only country music channel to carry the XL label for explicit language. On June 14, 2024, Jeremy Tepper, who served as Sirius XM Outlaw Country's program manager since its inception, died.

Current show hosts include:

- Hillbilly Jim ("Hillbilly Jim's Moonshine Matinee")
- Shooter Jennings ("Electric Rodeo")
- Johnny Knoxville and Roger Alan Wade ("The Big Ass Happy Family Jubilee")
- Elizabeth Cook ("Elizabeth Cook's Apron Strings")
- Dallas Wayne ("Dallas Wayne in Outlaw Country")
- Alamo Jones ("The Alamo Jones Show". Formerly "The Cowboy Jack Clement Show")
- Paula Nelson (Daughter of Willie Nelson) ("Outlaw Country With Paula Nelson")
- Buddy Miller and Jim Lauderdale ("The Buddy & Jim Show")

Former hosts include:

- Mojo Nixon ("The Loon in the Afternoon", Mojo died February 7th 2024)
- Fred Imus ("Fred's Trailer Park Bash", Imus died August 2011)
- Steve Earle ("Hardcore Troubadour Radio")
- Don Was ("The Motor City Hayride")
- Jack Clement ("The 'Cowyboy' Jack Clement Show", Clement's sidekick, Alamo Jones, took over the time slot with "The Alamo Jones Show" after Clement died in 2013)

== Outlaw Country Cruise ==
The Outlaw Country Cruise is an annual seven-day cruise aboard Norwegian Cruise Line ships, typically sailing from Miami in the late winter or early spring. The cruise features live performances and autograph signings by various artists and is hosted by SiriusXM Outlaw Country on-air personalities.

Lineups from the cruise's first ten voyages included The Mavericks, OId Crow Medicine Show, Blackberry Smoke, Emmylou Harris, John Anderson, Lucinda Williams, Steve Earle, Ray Wylie Hubbard, Old 97's, Kathleen Edwards, Carlene Carter, Elizabeth Cook, The Waco Brothers, Mike and the Moonpies, Jesse Dayton, The Supersuckers, Vandoliers, Bill Kirchen, Redd Volkaert, Dallas Wayne, Tommy McLain, C.C. Adcock, Linda Gail Lewis, Joe Carrasco, Augie Meyers, Rosie Flores, Slim Jim Phantom, Warner E. Hodges, Sarah Borges, The Mastersons, Roger Alan Wade, Mary Lee's Corvette, Andrew Leahey, and Mojo Nixon.

== Core artists ==
- Lucinda Williams
- Dwight Yoakam
- Merle Haggard
- Willie Nelson
- Johnny Cash
- Waylon Jennings
- Steve Earle
- Emmylou Harris
- Jamey Johnson
- Jason Isbell
- Sturgill Simpson
- Todd Snider
- Band of Heathens
- John Prine
- The Cactus Blossoms
- Chris Stapleton

== See also ==
- List of Sirius Satellite Radio stations
