= Woman (Burt Bacharach album) =

Live album by Burt Bacharach
- Released: 1979
- Recorded: 2 November 1978
- Venue: Jones Hall, Houston, Texas
- Label: A&M
- Producer: Michael Woolcock, Armin Steiner

Burt Bacharach chronology
Futures (1977)	Woman (1979)	Arthur; Film soundtrack (1981)

Professional ratings
Review scores
Source	Rating
The Encyclopedia of Popular Music	2/5 stars
The Rolling Stone Album Guide	3/5 stars

Woman is an album by Burt Bacharach in collaboration with the Houston Symphony Orchestra, released in 1979 on A&M Records. It was recorded live by Bacharach and the orchestra during a four-hour recording session on November 2, 1978, at Jones Hall in Houston, Texas. The project was originally conceived by Bacharach and Michael Woolcock. Guest vocalists included Carly Simon on the song "I Live In The Woods", Libby Titus on the song "Riverboat", and Sally Stevens on the song "There Is Time".

== Critical reception ==
The Washington Post called the album "an ambitious but mostly ignored collection of jazzlike orchestra music performed by the Houston Symphony." The Rolling Stone Album Guide called it a "semi-classical epic" and Bacharach's "most ambitious work."

== Track listing ==
All tracks composed by Burt Bacharach; except where indicated

1. "Summer of '77" – 3:55
2. "Woman" – 7:07
3. "Riverboat" (Bacharach, Libby Titus) – 3:26
4. "Magdalena" – 6:54
5. "New York Lady" – 6:31
6. "There Is Time" (Bacharach, Sally Stevens) – 6:36
7. "The Dancing Fool" (Bacharach, Anthony Newley) – 2:12
8. "I Live in the Woods" (Bacharach, Carly Simon, Libby Titus) – 6:04

== Personnel ==
- Burt Bacharach - vocals, arrangements, conductor, keyboards
- Micheal Woolcock, Armin Steiner - producers
- Libby Titus - vocals on "Riverboat"
- Carly Simon - vocals on "I Live in the Woods"
- Sally Stevens - vocals on "There is Time"
- Houston Symphony Orchestra - musicians
- Ronald Patterson - concertmaster

=== Guest Instrumentalists ===
- Mayuto Correa - percussion
- Robben Ford - guitar
- Arthur Munson - guitar
- Richard Greene - electric violin
- Erno Neufeld - solo violin on "There is Time"
- Milcho Levien - keyboards
- Warren Luening - first solo trumpet
- Bobby Shew - second solo trumpet
- David Parlato - fender bass
- John Phillips - alto saxophone, tenor saxophone, flute and oboe
- Grady Tate - drums
- Ann White, Marti McCall, Sally Stevens - backing vocals

Technical

- Armin Steiner, Linda Tyler - engineer
- Jack Crimes - chief engineer
- Mark Eshelman, Ricky Sanchez - assistant engineers
- Michael Reese - mastering engineer
