= Diesel Only Records =

American record label

- Founded: 1990
- Founder: Jeremy Tepper
- Genre: Country music
- Location: Brooklyn, NY

Diesel Only Records is a Brooklyn-based country music record label established in 1990 by musician and journalist Jeremy Tepper, then also the lead singer of the World Famous Blue Jays.

== History ==
Tepper, along with Diesel Only's cofounders, Jay Sherman-Godfrey and Albert Caiati, originally started the label with the goal of releasing vinyl 45s for use in jukeboxes at truck stops. Tepper also started the label with the goal of releasing his own band's music, as well as tracks by other artists from New York City. The first non-vinyl release by the label was 1992's Rig Rock Jukebox, which was also their first singles compilation. Also that year, the label released a single by Mark Brine entitled "New Blue Yodel," which, after Brine sent it to Hank Snow, landed him a gig at the Grand Ole Opry that July. By the end of 1993, Diesel Only had released more than 30 records by artists from across the United States.

Following a second singles compilation, Rig Rock Truck Stop, the label finally gained wider recognition in 1996 with its third, Rig Rock Deluxe, which was released as part of a deal with Upstart Records. The album included songs by Buck Owens, Steve Earle, and Marty Stuart, and won Americana Album of the Year from the National Association of Independent Record Distributors. Tepper recalled that after Owens agreed to contribute "Will There Be Big Rigs in Heaven?" to the album, they merely had to mention that he had signed on to the project, after which "we [Diesel Only] got anybody we wanted." Rig Rock Deluxe received a favorable review from Billboard, which described it as the label's best compilation yet.

In 1996, Peter Blackstock wrote in No Depression that through his work with Diesel Only, "Jeremy Tepper has established himself as a unique and indispensable cog in the alt-country underground." In 1997, Tepper married fellow musician Laura Cantrell. The label first diverged from its pattern of releasing trucking songs and related thematic compilations in 2000, with the release of Cantrell's debut album, Not the Tremblin' Kind. Cantrell and Tepper later became the co-owners and co-operators of Diesel Only. Cantrell has released all but one of her albums on Diesel Only (as of 2011).

== Artists ==
Artists who have released albums on Diesel Only include:

- Dale Watson
- World Famous Blue Jays
- Amy Allison
- Laura Cantrell
- Will Rigby
- Joe Flood
- Tammy Faye Starlite
- Ween
