= T Bone Burnett production discography =

T-Bone Burnett has won Grammy Awards for his work on the albums O Brother, Where Art Thou? (2000), Down from the Mountain (2001), A Wonderful World (2002), Cold Mountain (2004), Walk the Line (2006), Crazy Heart (2010), Raising Sand (2007), and One Kind Favor (2008). He won the Grammy Award for Producer of the Year (Non-Classical) in 2001 and 2004. Burnett produced music for the television programs Nashville and True Detective.

== 1960s and 1970s ==
- Whistler, Chaucer, Detroit, and Greenhill: The Unwritten Works of Geoffrey, Etc.— (1968)
- T-Bone Burnett: The B-52 Band & the Fabulous Skylarks (1972)
- Delbert McClinton: Delbert and Glen (1972)

== 1980s ==
- T Bone Burnett: Truth Decay (1980), Trap Door (1982) Behind the Trap Door (1984), T-Bone Burnett (1986), The Talking Animals (1987)
- BoDeans: Love & Hope & Sex & Dreams (1986)
- Peter Case: Peter Case (1986)
- Elvis Costello: King of America (1986), Out of Our Idiot (1987), Spike (1989)
- Marshall Crenshaw: Downtown (1985)
- Willie Dixon: Hidden Charms (1988)
- Tonio K: Romeo Unchained (1986), Notes from the Lost Civilization (1988)
- Tommy Keene: Run Now (1986), Songs from the Film (1986)
- Leo Kottke: Time Step (1983), My Father's Face (1989)
- Los Lobos: ...And a Time to Dance (1983) How Will the Wolf Survive? (1984), By the Light of the Moon (1987), La Pistola y El Corazon (1988)
- Roy Orbison: Mystery Girl (1989), A Black & White Night Live (1989),
- Sam Phillips: The Turning (1987), The Indescribable Wow (1988)

Soundtracks

- Great Balls of Fire (1989)

== 1990s ==
- T Bone Burnett: The Criminal Under My Own Hat (1992)
- Joseph Arthur: Vacancy (1999)
- BoDeans: Go Slow Down (1993)
- Bruce Cockburn Nothing but a Burning Light (1991), Dart to the Heart (1994)
- Counting Crows: August and Everything After (1993)
- A.J. Croce: A.J. Croce (1993)
- Dirty Looks: Five Easy Pieces (1991)
- Jackopierce: Bringing on the Weather (1994)
- Freedy Johnston: Blue Days Black Nights (1999)
- Joe Henry: Shuffletown (1990)
- Tonio K: Olé (1997)
- Wendy Matthews: Lily (1992) and The Witness Tree (1994)
- Nitty Gritty Dirt Band: Live Two Five (1991)
- Roy Orbison: King of Hearts (1992)
- Michael Petak: Pretty Little Lonely (1994)
- Sam Phillips: Cruel Inventions (1991), Martinis and Bikinis (1994), Omnipop (It's Only A Flesh Wound Lambchop) (1996), Zero Zero Zero (1998)
- David Poe: David Poe (1997)
- Seven Stories: Everything You Want (Nothing That You Need) (1993)
- Spinal Tap: Break Like the Wind (1992)
- The Surfers: Songs from the Pipe (1998)
- Daniel Tashian: Sweetie (1996)
- The Wallflowers: Bringing Down the Horse (1996)
- Gillian Welch: Revival (1996), Hell Among the Yearlings (1998)

Soundtracks

- The Big Lebowski (1998)
- Prêt-à-Porter (1995)
- Stealing Beauty (1996)
- Until the End of the World (1991)

== 2000–2009 ==
- T-Bone Burnett: The True False Identity (2006), Tooth of Crime (2008)
- Joseph Arthur: Come to Where I'm From (2000)
- Autolux: Future Perfect
- Tony Bennett & k.d. lang: A Wonderful World (2002)
- BoDeans: Still (2008)
- Brandi Carlile: The Story (2007)
- Bruce Cockburn: Speechless (2005)
- Elvis Costello: Secret, Profane & Sugarcane (2009)
- Evan and Jaron: Evan and Jaron
- Adam Freeland: Back to Mine (2005)
- B.B. King: One Kind Favor (2008)
- John Mellencamp: Life, Death, Love and Freedom (2008)
- Natalie Merchant: Motherland (2001)
- Minibar: Road Movies (2001)
- Moonalice: Moonalice (2009)
- Ollabelle: Ollabelle (2004)
- Sam Phillips: Fan Dance (2001), A Boot and a Shoe (2004)
- Robert Plant and Alison Krauss: Raising Sand (2007)
- Ralph Stanley: Ralph Stanley (2002), A Distant Land to Roam (2006)
- Rusty Truck: Broken Promises (2003), Limited Parking (2008)
- Gillian Welch: Time (The Revelator) (2001)
- Cassandra Wilson: Thunderbird (2006)
- Akiko Yano: akiko (2008)

Soundtracks

- O Brother, Where Art Thou? (2000)
- Cold Mountain (2003)
- Divine Secrets of the Ya-Ya Sisterhood (2002)
- Down from the Mountain (2001)
- The Ladykillers (2004)
- A Mighty Wind (2003)
- Walk the Line (2005)

== 2010–present ==
- Gregg Allman: Low Country Blues (2011)
- Sara Bareilles: Amidst the Chaos (2019)
- Ryan Bingham: Junky Star (2010)
- Jeff Bridges: Jeff Bridges (2011)
- Betty Buckley: Ghostlight (2014)
- The Chieftains: Voice of Ages (2012)
- Jack Clement: For Once and for All (2014)
- Bruce Cockburn: Rumours of Glory (2014)
- Elvis Costello: National Ransom (2010), In Motion Pictures (2012), Unfaithful Music (2015)
- Jakob Dylan: Women + Country (2010)
- Steve Earle: I'll Never Get Out of This World Alive (2011)
- Rhiannon Giddens: Tomorrow Is My Turn (2015) Factory Girl (2015)
- Elton John & Leon Russell: The Union (2010)
- Elton John: The Diving Board (2013), Wonderful Crazy Night (2016)
- Diana Krall: Glad Rag Doll (2012)
- John Mellencamp: No Better Than This (2010), Plain Spoken (2014)
- Mini Mansions: The Great Pretenders (2015)
- The New Basement Tapes: Lost on the River (2014)
- Willie Nelson: Country Music (2010)
- Lisa Marie Presley: Storm & Grace (2012)
- Punch Brothers: The Phosphorescent Blues (2015), The Wireless (2015)
- Robert Randolph and the Family Band: We Walk This Road (2010)
- The Secret Sisters: The Secret Sisters (2010), Put Your Needle Down (2014)
- Striking Matches: Nothing but the Silence (2015)
- Zucchero Fornaciari: Black Cat (2016)
- Imelda May: Life Love Flesh Blood (2017)
- The Corrs: Jupiter Calling (2017)
- Ilse Delange: Gravel & Dust (2019)
- Robert Plant and Alison Krauss: Raise the Roof (2021)
- Ringo Starr: Look Up (2025)
- Ringo Starr: Long Long Road (2026)

Soundtracks and concerts

- Another Day, Another Time: Celebrating the Music of Inside Llewyn Davis (2013)
- Crazy Heart (2010)
- Ghost Brothers of Darkland County (2013)
- The Hunger Games: Songs from District 12 and Beyond (2012)
- Inside Llewyn Davis (2013)
- The Music of Nashville: Season 1, Volume 1 (2012)
- The Music of Nashville: Season 1, Volume 2 (2013)
- A Place at the Table (2013)
- The Speaking Clock Revue: Live from the Beacon Theatre (2011)
- True Detective (2015)
