= BoDeans discography =

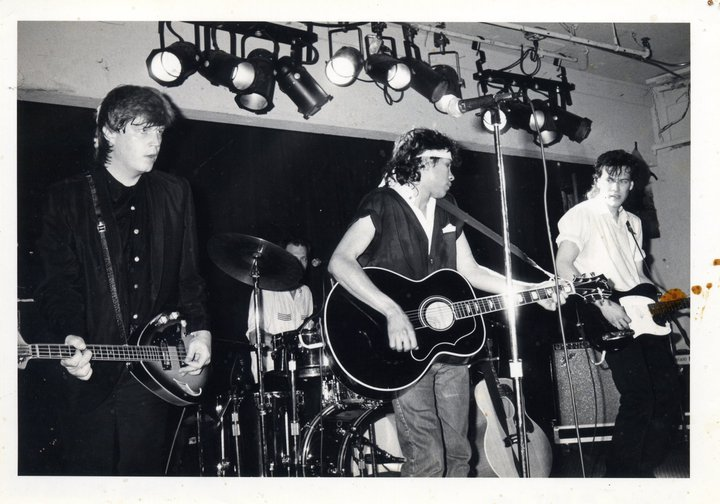
- Studio albums: 15
- Live albums: 4
- Compilation albums: 2
- Singles: 7
- B-sides: 2
- Video albums: 3
- Music videos: 11

BoDeans is an American rock band. The band has released 15 studio albums, four live albums, seven singles, and two compilation albums.

== Albums ==
=== Studio albums ===
Year	Album	US	AUS
1986	Love & Hope & Sex & Dreams	115	97
1987	Outside Looking In	86	72
1989	Home	94	-
1991	Black and White	105	101
1993	Go Slow Down	127	204
1996	Blend	132	-
2004	Resolution	194	-
2008	Still	194	-
2010	Mr. Sad Clown	172	-
2011	Indigo Dreams	—	-
2012	American Made	—	-
2015	I Cant Stop	—	-
2017	Thirteen	—	-
2020	2020 Vision	—	-
2022	4 The Last Time	—	-

=== Compilations and live albums ===
Year	Album	US
1995	Joe Dirt Car	161
2001	Slash and Burn	—
2003	The Leftovers	—
2005	Homebrewed: Live from the Pabst	—
2012	Amped Across America	—

== Singles ==
Year	Title	Chart positions						Album
Year	Title	US	US Mod. Rock	US Main. Rock	US Adult	US Main. Top 40	AUS	Album
1986	"Fadeaway"	—	—	—	—	—	76	Love & Hope & Sex & Dreams
1987	"Only Love"	—	—	16	—	—	95	Outside Looking In
1988	"Dreams"	—	—	32	—	—	—	Outside Looking In
1989	"You Don't Get Much"	—	15	20	—	—	—	Home
1990	"Good Things"	—	—	—	—	—	148	Black and White
1991	"Black, White, and Blood Red"	—	—	34	—	—	196	Black and White
1993	"Feed the Fire"	—	—	34	—	—	—	Go Slow Down
1993	"Closer to Free"	16	—	—	3	6	11	Go Slow Down
1996	"Hurt by Love"	—	—	—	33	39	—	Blend
2022	"Ya Gotta Go Crazy"	—	—	—	—	—	—	4 The Last Time

=== Promotional singles ===
Year	Title	Album
1986	"She's a Runaway"	Love & Hope & Sex & Dreams
1986	"Angels"	Love & Hope & Sex & Dreams

== Videography ==
- Homebrewed: Live from the Pabst (2005, DVD)

== Music videos ==
- "She's a Runaway" (1986)
- "Fadeaway" (1986)
- "Only Love" (1987)
- "Dreams" (1988)
- "Good Work" (1989)
- "You Don't Get Much" (1989)
- "Good Things" (1991)
- "Black White & Blood Red" (1991)
- "Closer to Free" (1996)
- "All the World" (2012)
- "American" (2012)
