= Flyer (album) =

Studio album by Nanci Griffith
- Released: September 13, 1994
- Recorded: February – June 1994
- Genre: Country folk
- Length: 56:09
- Label: Elektra
- Producers: Peter Collins, Peter Buck

Nanci Griffith chronology
The Best of Nanci Griffith (1993)	Flyer (1994)	Country Gold (1997)

Flyer was the 11th studio album released by singer-songwriter Nanci Griffith. Released in 1994, it contained 15 tracks, mostly of original material. It was nominated for the Grammy Award for Best Contemporary Folk Album at the 37th Annual Grammy Awards. The album had contributions from Peter Buck, Mark Knopfler, Emmylou Harris, Larry Mullen Jr., Adam Clayton, Adam Duritz, the Chieftains, and the Indigo Girls.

Griffith wrote or co-wrote all of the tracks except "Southbound Train". She said that while much of her writing had been fiction, the songs on this album were more autobiographical. "This album is of songs that came internally from my life with no delays or fiction. They are of immediate reaction and inspiration."

== Reception ==
Professional ratings
Review scores
Source	Rating
AllMusic	4/5 stars
Chicago Tribune	3/4 stars
Entertainment Weekly	C
Los Angeles Times	3/4 stars
Music Week	3/5 stars
Q	4/5 stars
Rolling Stone	4/5 stars

Writing for AllMusic, critic Vik Iyengar wrote of the album, "Although she falters a bit when choosing to tackle politics ("Time of Inconvenience"), this is her most consistent album of original songs in almost a decade."

== Track listing ==
All tracks composed by Nanci Griffith except where indicated.

1. "The Flyer" – 4:23
2. "Nobody's Angel" – 4:13
3. "Say It Isn't So" (Griffith, Harlan Howard) – 3:18
4. "Southbound Train" (Julie Gold) – 4:32
5. "These Days in an Open Book" – 3:33
6. "Time of Inconvenience" – 3:48
7. "Don't Forget About Me" (Griffith, James Hooker) – 3:00
8. "Always Will" – 2:42
9. "Going Back to Georgia" (Griffith, Adam Duritz, Brian Claflin) – 4:15
10. "Talk to Me While I'm Listening" – 4:12
11. "Fragile" – 3:26
12. "On Grafton Street" (Griffith, Fred Koller) – 3:58
13. "Anything You Need but Me" – 3:08
14. "Goodnight to Mother's Dream" – 4:03
15. "This Heart" – 3:26

== Personnel ==
Adapted from liner notes

=== Principal musicians ===
- Nanci Griffith - lead vocals (throughout), harmony vocals (except 11), guitar (throughout)
- Al Anderson – acoustic guitar (13, 15), electric guitar (1, 2, 9, 14, 15)
- Fran Breen – drums (1, 2, 6, 8, 9, 13, 15)
- Bill Dillon – acoustic guitar (3), electric guitar (3, 7, 10, 15), mandolin (5, 12), guitar (unspecified) (5, 12), "Low 6-string Star Fire Guild electric guitar" (13)
- James Hooker – keyboards (1, 4, 10, 13), Hammond B3 (3, 5), piano (3, 5, 7, 9, 12, 14), harmonium and Wurlitzer piano (2), harpsichord (11), harmony vocal (4)
- David Mansfield – dobro (5), electric guitar (7), mandocello (3, 11), mandolin (7, 9), violin (9, 10, 14)
- Pat McInerney – percussion (1, 2, 6, 8–10, 13, 14), tom tom (15)
- John Painter – electric guitar (7), electric slide guitar (3), electric baritone guitar (5), string arrangements (2, 14), accordion (13), flugelhorn (11)
- Michael Rhodes – bass guitar (1–5, 9, 10, 13–15)

=== Other contributors ===
- David Angell – violin (4, 14)
- Eddie Bayers – "famous kick drum" (3)
- Derek Bell (The Chieftains) – harp (12)
- Byrd Burton – acoustic guitar, electric guitar (5)
- Andy Carlson – violin (8)
- John Catchings – cello (2, 4, 14)
- Frank Christian – acoustic guitar (1, 2, 9, 14), electric guitar (15), guitar (unspecified) (10)
- Adam Clayton (U2) – bass guitar (5, 7, 12), bass pedals (12)
- Sonny Curtis – supporting vocals, "rhythm Stratocaster electric guitar" (15)
- David Davidson – violin (2, 4, 14)
- Ron de la Vega – cello (8)
- Adam Duritz – duet vocal (9), harmony vocal (2, 10)
- Ramm Eberhard – French horn (4)
- Martin Fay (The Chieftains) – high fiddle (12)
- Emmylou Harris – backing vocals (11)
- John Hedgecoth – jug (1)
- John Keane – electric guitar (6), steel guitar (8)
- Seán Keane (The Chieftains) – low fiddle
- Mary Ann Kennedy – percussion (3), backing vocals (7, 11)
- Jennifer Kimball – backing vocals (11)
- Mark Knopfler – electric guitar (7)
- Tony Levin – didjeridu and bubble bass (2), bass guitar (11), Chapman stick (1, 10, 15)
- Sam Llanas – harmony vocals (15)
- Jerry Marotta – drums, percussion (3)
- Pat McLaughlin – mandola (13), supporting vocals (7, 12)
- Matt Molloy (The Chieftains) – flute (12)
- Paddy Moloney (The Chieftains) – whistle (2), penny-whistle (12)
- Larry Mullen, Jr. (U2) – drums and percussion (5, 7, 12), "leg & boot" (5), "bongos, cowbells, percussion and closing drumstick toss" (15)
- Kurt Neumann – backing vocals (15)
- Mickey Raphael – bass harmonica (1, 3), harmonica (3, 5, 9, 10)
- Amy Ray (Indigo Girls) – supporting vocals (5), "accidental a cappella intro 'Time'" (6)
- Pam Rose – backing vocals (11)
- Emily Saliers (Indigo Girls) – supporting vocals (5), "accidental a cappella intro 'Time'" (6)
- Lee Satterfield – backing vocals, choir arrangement (11)
- Dave Schools – bass guitar (6, 8)
- Holly Tashian – backing vocals (11)
- Tim White – Hammond B3 (6)
- Kathi Whitley – backing vocals (11)
- Kristin Wilkinson – viola (2, 4, 14)

== Charts ==
Chart (1994)	Peak position
European Albums (Eurotipsheet)	67
Irish Albums (IFPI)	9
Scottish Albums (Official Charts)	11
UK Albums (Official Charts)	20
UK Country Albums (Official Charts)	1
US Billboard 200	48
