= The Alpha Band (album) =

Studio album by the Alpha Band
- Released: 1976
- Recorded: by Larry Hirsch on August 19, 20 and 21, 1976
- Studio: Paramount, Los Angeles
- Genre: Rock
- Label: Arista

The Alpha Band chronology
The Alpha Band (1976)	Spark in the Dark (1977)

Professional ratings
Review scores
Source	Rating
AllMusic	4.5/5 stars
Christgau's Record Guide	B+

The Alpha Band is the debut album by the rock group the Alpha Band, released in 1976. The band was formed in 1976 from the remnants of Bob Dylan's Rolling Thunder Revue. The core band members were T-Bone Burnett, Steven Soles and David Mansfield.

== Track listing ==
Side one

1. "Interviews" (T-Bone Burnett, Bob Neuwirth, Larry Poons)
2. "Cheap Perfume" (Burnett, Neuwirth, J. Steven Soles)
3. "Keep It in the Family" (Soles)
4. "Ten Figures" (Burnett, Fleming)
5. "Wouldn't You Know" (Soles)

Side two

1. "Madman" (Burnett, Soles)
2. "The Dogs" (Burnett, Fleming, Phil Taylor)
3. "Arizona Telegram" (Soles)
4. "Dark Eyes" (Burnett, Fleming)
5. "Last Chance to Dance" (Burnett, Carson)

== Personnel ==
- T-Bone Burnett – vocals, guitar, piano
- David Jackson – bass
- David Mansfield – violin, mandolin, guitar
- Matt Betton – drums
- Steven Soles – vocals, guitar
- K.O. Thomas – keyboards on "Keep it in the Family"
- Rosanna Taplin – background vocals, vocal on "The Dogs"
- Roscoe West – background vocals, vocals on "Interviews"
