= Blend (album) =

Studio album by BoDeans
- Released: 1996
- Genre: Alternative
- Label: Slash
- Producer: BoDeans, Greg Goldman

BoDeans chronology
Joe Dirt Car (1995)	Blend (1996)	Resolution (2004)

Professional ratings
Review scores
Source	Rating
AllMusic	3/5 stars
Entertainment Weekly	C

Blend is the BoDeans sixth studio album, and was released in 1996. It peaked at number 132 on the Billboard 200 chart.

== Overview ==
After the band achieved fame and a new audience with '"Closer to Free", they resisted the pressure to duplicate the single's success and wanted to avoid rehashing the same formula. Like Go Slow Down, the band chose to record their next album at Hacksville, their studio in a rented storefront, and self-produced the album with the assistance of producer/engineer Greg Goldman. Recording took place over a two-year period during the time in between tours. Bob Clearmountain was hired to mix "The Understanding" and "Hurt By Love", while Tchad Blake mixed the uptempo "Hey Pretty Girl". The result was a more rock-oriented sound than their previous album, though it continued along a similar direction.

== Reception ==
Despite not matching the success of "Closer to Free", "Hurt By Love" saw minor chart success and critics commented on the album's consistency. Music critic Rick Anderson, writing for AllMusic, praised the songwriting though he criticized the lyrics. He said, "'Hurt By Love' is what the BoDeans are trying for throughout this whole album, but they only get there once or twice." However, Chuck Eddy of Entertainment Weekly gave it a mixed review, stating: "Having finally achieved pop stardom via their Party of Five theme song, this long-suffering Wisconsin bar band now tries to preserve their meager integrity by acting as un-Hollywood as possible. With its timid, muffled harmonies over numbing guitar thrumming, Blend has enough forlorn corn to fill every silo in the heartland."

== Track listing ==
All songs written by Kurt Neumann and Sam Llanas.

1. "The Understanding" – 4:10
2. "Heart of a Miracle" – 4:11
3. "Count On Me" – 3:48
4. "Can't Stop Thinking" – 3:20
5. "Hurt By Love" – 3:58
6. "Hey Pretty Girl" – 2:44
7. "All I Ever Wanted" – 5:04
8. "Do What You Want" – 3:15
9. "Red Roses" – 4:08
10. "Lullabye" – 4:02

== Personnel ==
BoDeans

- Kurt Neumann – vocals, electric and acoustic guitars
- Sam Llanas – vocals, acoustic guitar
- Bob Griffin – bass guitar
- Nick Kitsos – drums, percussion

Additional personnel

- Danny Federici – accordion
- Alex Acuña – percussion
- Bob Clearmountain – mixing (tracks #1, #5)
- Tchad Blake – mixing (track #6)
