= Spark in the Dark =

Studio album by the Alpha Band
- Released: 1977
- Genre: Rock and roll
- Label: Arista

The Alpha Band chronology
The Alpha Band (1976)	Spark in the Dark (1977)	The Statue Makers of Hollywood (1978)

Professional ratings
Review scores
Source	Rating
AllMusic	2.5/5 stars
Christgau's Record Guide	B+

Spark in the Dark is the second album by the rock band the Alpha Band, released in 1977. The core band members remained T-Bone Burnett, Steven Soles and David Mansfield. Five drummers performed for the recording sessions, including guest Ringo Starr.

== Track listing ==
Side 1

1. "East of East" (T-Bone Burnett, Bob Neuwirth, Steven Soles)
2. "Born in Captivity" (Arthur Buster Stahr)
3. "Blue Lonely Night" (Soles)
4. "Silver Mantis" (Burnett, John Fleming)
5. "Honey Run" (K. O. Thomas)

Side 2

1. "Adrenalin" (Burnett, Soles, Jim Ganzer)
2. "You Angel You" (Bob Dylan)
3. "Not Everything Has a Price" (Burnett, Soles)
4. "Love and Romance" (Soles)
5. "Mystified" (Burnett)
6. "Spark in the Dark (On the Moody Existentialist)" (Burnett)
7. "Jazz Hymn" (W. M. Ham)

== Personnel ==
- T-Bone Burnett – vocals, guitar, piano
- David Mansfield – guitar, mandolin, violin, dobro, pedal steel guitar, percussion, cello, viola, violin
- Steven Soles – vocals, guitar, piano
- David Miner – bass
- Matt Betton – drums
- Bill Maxwell – drums
- Joe Correro – drums
- Geoffrey Hales – drums
- Ringo Starr – drums ("Born in Captivity" and "You Angel You")
- K.O. Thomas – keyboards
- Mike Utley – keyboards
- Osamu Kitajima – koto
- Cindy Bullens – background vocals
