= Truth Decay (T Bone Burnett album) =

Studio album by T Bone Burnett
- Released: 1980
- Genre: Rock
- Label: Takoma
- Producer: Reggie Fisher

T Bone Burnett chronology
| The B-52 Band & the Fabulous Skylarks (1972) | Truth Decay (1980) | Trap Door (1982) |

Alternative Cover

Truth Decay is an album by T Bone Burnett, released in 1980. It was his first solo release since 1972 and his first as T Bone Burnett.

== Reception ==
Professional ratings
Review scores
| Source | Rating |
|---|---|
| AllMusic | 4.5/5 stars |

In The Boston Phoenix, Mark Moses wrote that with Truth Decay, Burnett became "a cult figure who deserves his cult" and that the album "shed the Alpha Band’s exoticism for the coarse, slapped-down feel of rockabilly and C&W." In his review, music critic Brett Hartenbach of AllMusic called the album a "modest, passionate gem." and wrote "Burnett delivers a collection of parables, tales, and personal struggles propelled by his strong beliefs and some captivating roots rock."

== Track listing ==
All tracks composed by T Bone Burnett; except where indicated

1. "Quicksand" – 4:01
2. "Talk Talk Talk Talk Talk" – 3:44
3. "Boomerang" (Burnett, David Mansfield, Steven Soles) – 4:19
4. "Love At First Sight" – 4:15
5. "Madison Avenue" – 2:38
6. "Driving Wheel" – 3:19
7. "Come Home" (Burnett, Mansfield) – 4:33
8. "Power Of Love" – 2:55
9. "House Of Mirrors" – 3:34
10. "Tears Tears Tears" – 2:36
11. "Pretty Girls" – 4:08
12. "I'm Coming Home" – 4:04

== Personnel ==
=== Musicians ===
- T Bone Burnett – vocals, guitar
- Steven Soles – guitar, vocals
- Turner Stephen Bruton – guitar
- David Mansfield – guitar
- Jerry McGee – guitar, bass
- David Miner – bass
- Billy Swan – vocals
- K.O. Thomas – piano
- David Kemper – drums

=== Production ===
- Produced by Reggie Fisher
- Engineered by Geoff Gillette and Reggie Fisher
- Mixed by Larry Hirsch and Reggie Fisher
- Mastered by Bernie Grunman and Reggie Fisher
