= Proof Through the Night =

Studio album by T Bone Burnett
- Released: 1983
- Genre: Rock
- Label: Warner Bros.
- Producer: Jeff Eyrich

T Bone Burnett chronology
Trap Door (1982)	Proof Through the Night (1983)	Behind the Trap Door (1984)

Alternative Cover
- Cover of the reissue with The Complete Trap Door

Proof Through the Night is a 1983 album by T Bone Burnett, produced by Jeff Eyrich. Proof Through the Night was unavailable on CD for many years. Then some tracks, radically remixed with new vocals if not re-recorded entirely, appeared on the 20/20 career compilation in May 2006. Rhino Handmade issued a CD version of the album on March 27, 2007, which also includes the Trap Door and Beyond the Trap Door EPs. The double CD was issued in a numbered limited edition of 5,000. A cover of the Hank Williams (as Luke the Drifter) song "Be Careful of Stones that You Throw", recorded during an early session for the album, is also included on the CD.

== Reception ==
Professional ratings
Review scores
Source	Rating
Allmusic	4/5 stars

Music critic Brett Hartenbach of Allmusic called the album "smart, tight, [and] insightful" and wrote "To some, his persistent morality may come across as being a bit cold or even self-righteous, but further investigation reveals an underlying empathy for the individuals, even if a cynicism for the times in which they live is expressed. And if Burnett may seem tough, don't think he excludes himself from the same scrutiny."

== Track listing ==
All songs written by T Bone Burnett, except where noted.

=== Side one ===
1. "The Murder Weapon" (featuring Masakazu Yoshizawa & Mick Ronson)
2. "Fatally Beautiful" (featuring Pete Townshend)
3. "After All These Years"
4. "Baby Fall Down" (featuring Steven Soles)
5. "The Sixties" (featuring Mick Ronson & Pete Townshend)

=== Side two ===
1. "Stunned" (featuring Andy Williams & Stan Lynch)
2. "Pressure" (featuring Mick Ronson)
3. "Hula Hoop" (Written by T-Bone Burnett/John Fleming/Roscoe West)
4. "When the Night Falls" (featuring Ry Cooder)
5. "Hefner and Disney" (featuring Masakazu Yoshizawa & Pete Townshend)
6. "Shut it Tight" (featuring Richard Thompson)

== Personnel ==
- T Bone Burnett – vocals, guitar
- David Mansfield – guitar
- David Miner – bass
- Jerry Marotta – drums
- Ry Cooder on "When the Night Falls" – guitar
- Stan Lynch – drums, percussion, keyboards, vocals
- Mick Ronson – guitar
- Richard Thompson – guitar, mandolin
- Pete Townshend – guitar
- Masakazu Yoshizawa
- The Williams Brothers – vocals
- Jeff Eyrich – producer

== Chart positions ==
Year	Chart	Position
1983	Billboard Pop Albums	188
