= Gave Proof Through the Night =

Gave Proof Through the Night and similar phrases could refer to:

- "...Gave Proof Through the Night... ", a phrase from the national anthem of the United States, "The Star-Spangled Banner"
- Proof Through the Night, a 1983 album by T Bone Burnett
- "Proof Through the Night", a 1984 episode of the American television series Airwolf
