= Outside Looking In (album) =

Studio album by BoDeans
- Released: October 1987
- Genre: Alternative
- Length: 48:54
- Label: Slash
- Producer: Jerry Harrison

BoDeans chronology
Love & Hope & Sex & Dreams (1986)	Outside Looking In (1987)	Home (1989)

Singles from Outside Looking In
- 1. "Only Love" Released: 1987; 2. "Dreams" Released: 1988

Outside Looking In is the BoDeans second studio album, and was released in 1987. It was produced by Jerry Harrison of Talking Heads. It reached number 86 on the Billboard 200 chart.

== Overview ==
Following the success of Love & Hope & Sex & Dreams and having been voted Best New American Band by Rolling Stone, the band wished to expand their sound and shed the "roots" label, which they believed categorized their music unfairly. They returned to Los Angeles to work with producer Mike Campbell, but the sessions were shelved after disagreement arose over the album's sound. Campbell wished for the album to resemble Tom Petty's brand of 1960's rock and wanted Kurt Neumann to alter his guitar-playing style accordingly. The band, however, felt that this style did not fit their music and instead wanted a state-of-the-art production. Jerry Harrison had previously expressed interest in working with the band, an offer which they accepted after returning to Wisconsin. Drummer Guy Hoffman had taken some time off from the band to be with his newborn baby, so session drummer Rick Jaegar filled in on the album. Hoffman left the band for good shortly thereafter.

== Reception ==
Professional ratings
Review scores
Source	Rating
AllMusic	2/5 stars
New Musical Express	4/10
Rolling Stone	(unfavorable)

Music critic William Ruhlmann, writing for AllMusic, wrote of the album: "The songwriting wasn't as impressive, and the de-emphasis on such signature sounds as Sammy Llanas' nasal voice inclined the album toward anonymity."

== Track listing ==
All songs by Kurt Neumann and Sam Llanas.

1. "Dreams" - 3:34
2. "Pick Up the Pieces" – 3:24
3. "Take It Tomorrow" – 3:55
4. "Say About Love" – 4:12
5. "Don't Be Lonely" – 3:51
6. "Runaway Love" – 3:50
7. "Only Love" – 3:08
8. "What It Feels Like" – 2:31
9. "The Ballad of Jenny Rae" – 3:50
10. "Forever Young (The Wild Ones)" – 3:56
11. "Someday" – 3:31
12. "Fool" – 4:30
13. "I'm in Trouble Again" – 4:26

== Personnel ==
BoDeans

- Kurt Neumann – vocals, acoustic and electric guitar
- Sam Llanas – vocals, acoustic guitar
- Bob Griffin – bass guitar

Additional Personnel

- Rick Jaegar – drums
- Jayrase Snyder – drums
- Junior Brantley – keyboards
- Jerry Harrison – synthesizers, drum programming
- Arlene Newson – background vocals
- Shirley Sims – background vocals
