= T-Bone Burnett (album) =

T Bone Burnett

Studio album by T Bone Burnett
- Released: 1986
- Genre: Country
- Length: 45:16
- Label: Dot
- Producer: David Miner

T Bone Burnett chronology
Behind the Trap Door (1984)	T Bone Burnett (1986)	The Talking Animals (1987)

Professional ratings
Review scores
Source	Rating
AllMusic	3.5/5 stars
Christgau's Record Guide: The '80s	B+
Tom Hull – on the Web	B+

T Bone Burnett is an album by T Bone Burnett, released in 1986. It was his only release on the Dot label.

T Bone Burnett was reissued in 1995 by Universal Special.

== Track listing ==
All tracks written by T Bone Burnett; except where indicated

1. "River of Love" – 3:30
2. "Poison Love" (Elmer Laird) – 2:33
3. "Shake Yourself Loose" – 3:00
4. "No Love at All" (David Mansfield, Billy Swan) – 2:54
5. "Annabelle Lee" (Bob Neuwirth) – 5:01
6. "I Remember" (instrumental) – 2:21
7. "I Remember" – 3:39
8. "Little Daughter" – 3:29
9. "Oh No Darling" – 3:49
10. "Time" (Tom Waits) – 3:59
11. "Little Daughter" (instrumental) – 3:23
12. "Song to a Dead Man" (Burnett, Larry Poons) – 3:34
13. "The Bird That I Held in My Hand" (Burnett, Neuwirth, Swan) – 3:04

== Personnel ==
- T Bone Burnett – vocals, guitar
- Jerry Douglas – dobro, lap steel guitar
- Byron Berline – fiddle
- Steve Duncan – drums
- David Hidalgo – guitar, accordion, vocals, 8-String Bass
- Jerry Scheff – bass
- Billy Swan – vocals
