= Go Slow Down =

Studio album by BoDeans
- Released: October 12, 1993
- Recorded: 1992–1993
- Genre: Alternative
- Label: Slash
- Producers: T-Bone Burnett (exec.), BoDeans

BoDeans chronology
Black and White (1991)	Go Slow Down (1993)	Joe Dirt Car (1995)

Singles from Go Slow Down
- 1. "Feed the Fire" Released: 1993; 2. "Closer to Free" Released: 1993

Professional ratings
Review scores
Source	Rating
AllMusic	4.5/5 stars
Rolling Stone	3.5/5 stars

Go Slow Down is the BoDeans' fifth studio album, and was released on October 12, 1993. It peaked at number 127 on the Billboard 200 chart.

== Overview ==
After taking a more pop approach to Black and White, the band wished to return to a simpler sound and record an album that they were truly happy with. They began setting up a studio in a rented storefront and called upon T-Bone Burnett (producer of their debut album) to work with them once again, this time in an executive producer role. They originally tracked 30 songs live as a full band, but under the advice of their record label, all except for "Closer to Free" were re-recorded with Kurt Neumann playing most of the instruments himself. The resulting album was more acoustic and laid-back. In 1994, "Closer to Free" was selected as the theme song to the TV series Party of Five. It was subsequently re-released as a single and became the band's biggest hit.

== Reception ==
Music critic William Ruhlmann, writing for AllMusic, wrote that the album "may have been the statement of a band that had been through a lot and reached a point of emotional exhaustion, but the BoDeans used their experience to craft their most deeply felt and satisfying music." Likewise, Thom Jurek of Rolling Stone stated: "Go Slow Down reveals the BoDeans in firm control of their musical vision" and "is perhaps the finest album to date by a band that keeps on growing. With any justice, it should make the BoDeans more than critics' favorites."

== Track listing ==
All songs written by Kurt Neumann and Sam Llanas.

1. "Closer to Free" - 3:08
2. "Save a Little" - 4:03
3. "In Trow / Texas Ride Song" - 5:18
4. "Go Slow Down" - 3:37
5. "Idaho" - 4:39
6. "Freedom" - 4:34
7. "The Other Side" - 3:02
8. "Stay On" - 5:40
9. "Feed the Fire" - 3:43
10. "Cold Winter's Day" - 4:21
11. "Something's Telling Me" - 5:57
12. "So Fine" - 2:39

== Personnel ==
BoDeans

- Kurt Neumann - vocals, electric guitar, acoustic guitar, drums, slide guitar, mandolin, 6-string bass, tambourine, hand claps, sandpaper
- Sam Llanas - vocals, acoustic guitar, harmonica, howling
- Michael Ramos - keyboards, piano, organ, accordion
- Bob Griffin - bass guitar, acoustic bass, fretless bass

Additional personnel

- Kenny Aronoff - drums on tracks #1, #7
