= Still (BoDeans album) =

Studio album by BoDeans
- Released: March 4, 2008
- Genre: Alternative
- Labels: He and He Records
- Producer: T-Bone Burnett

BoDeans chronology
Resolution (2004)	Still (2008)	Mr. Sad Clown (2010)

Professional ratings
Review scores
Source	Rating
AllMusic	3/5 stars

Still is a full-length studio album by the BoDeans, released in 2008. It peaked at number 194 on the Billboard 200. It peaked at number 30 on the Top Independent Albums chart.

== Reception ==
Mark Deming, writing for AllMusic, stated: "The scrappy enthusiasm that fueled the BoDeans' best music has given way to a more measured and mature sound in the 21st century, but Sam Llanas and Kurt Neuman are still capable of rocking a bit when they feel like it (cue up 'Lucille' for a taste), and the emotional ardor that's always made itself known in their songwriting is as clear and present as ever... Still is well worth a listen for BoDeans fans, but it falls a few notches short of what these guys can do when they're hitting their stride." The Austin Chronicle called the album "a dozen inimitable tracks that veer from suburban psychedelia to folk-rock, taking off on 'Pretty Ghost', a swirling, guitar-based meditation on celebrity and fantasy." Paste wrote that the BoDeans "settle into the durable, sometimes predictable bar rock they do best."

== Track listing ==
All songs by Kurt Neumann and Sam Llanas

1. "Pretty Ghost"
2. "Round Here Somewhere"
3. "Willin'"
4. "Lucille"
5. "The First Time"
6. "Everyday"
7. "Waste a Lifetime"
8. "Breathe"
9. "Wonder Wonder"
10. "Hearing"
11. "Found Me a Reason"
12. "Arms"

== Personnel ==
BoDeans

- Kurt Neumann – vocals, electric and acoustic guitars, bass, percussion, bongos on "Arms"
- Sam Llanas – vocals, acoustic guitar

Additional personnel

- Kenny Aronoff - drums, bongos on "Pretty Ghost"
- Noah Levy - drums (tracks #5, #8, #9, #10)
- Jay Bellerose - drums and percussion (tracks #8, #12)
- Bukka Allen - accordion, Hammond B3, harmonium
- Eric Holden - bass
- T Bone Burnett - guitar (track #10)
