= The Statue Makers of Hollywood =

Studio album by the Alpha Band
- Released: 1978
- Genre: Rock
- Label: Arista
- Producer: Larry Hirsch

The Alpha Band chronology
Spark in the Dark (1977)	The Statue Makers of Hollywood (1978)	The Arista Albums (2005)

The Statue Makers of Hollywood is the third and final album by the rock band the Alpha Band, released in 1978.

== Critical reception ==
Professional ratings
Review scores
Source	Rating
AllMusic	4/5 stars
Christgau's Record Guide	B+
The Rolling Stone Record Guide	3/5 stars

The Los Angeles Times noted that, "although the exotic instrumental approach is sometimes overly sterile, it is usually redeemed by David Mansfield's exceptional violin and mandolin playing."

== Track listing ==
1. "Tick Tock" (T-Bone Burnett, David Mansfield, Steven Soles)
2. "Rich Man" (Burnett)
3. "Mighty Man" (Burnett)
4. "Perverse Generation" (Burnett)
5. "Two Sisters" (Soles, David Carson)
6. "Two People in the Modern World" (Soles)
7. "Back in My Baby's Arms Again" (Burnett)
8. "Thank God" (Hank Williams)

== Personnel ==
- T-Bone Burnett – vocals, guitar, piano
- David Mansfield – guitar, mandolin, organ, dobro, background vocals
- Steven Soles – vocals, guitar, piano
- Stephen Bruton – vocals, guitar
- Bill Maxwell – drums
- Everett Bryson – percussion
- Lee Pastora – percussion, conga
- David Miner – bass
- Rob Stoner – bass, background vocals
- Bill Thedford – background vocals
- James Felix – background vocals
- Daniel Moore – background vocals
- Perry Morgan – background vocals
- Cindy Bullens – background vocals
- Christ Memorial Church of God in Christ Radio Choir – background vocals
- Andraé Crouch – background vocals
- Jessy Dixon – background vocals
- Scott Page – Saxophone
- David Duke – French horn
- Larry Ford – trumpet
- Jim Gordon – saxophone
- David Hungate – trombone
- Jerry Jumonville – saxophone
- Jerry Peterson – saxophone
- Roy Poper – trumpet
- Jim Price – trombone
- Jay Pruitt – trumpet
- Alan Robinson – French horn
