= Resolution (BoDeans album) =

Studio album by BoDeans
- Released: June 22, 2004
- Genre: Alternative
- Label: Zoë Records
- Producer: Kurt Neumann

BoDeans chronology
Blend (1996)	Resolution (2004)	Still (2008)

Professional ratings
Review scores
Source	Rating
AllMusic	3/5 stars

Resolution is the BoDeans' 7th full-length studio album. It was released on June 22, 2004 and was the first album of new material from the band in 8 years.

== Reception ==
Music critic Ronnie D. Lankford, Jr., writing for AllMusic, said the album "finds the BoDeans in good form as the band revisits its distinct brand of Americana, and will be eagerly sought after by fans."

== Track listing ==
1. "If It Makes You" – 3:24
2. "Marianne" – 3:43
3. "(We Can) Live" – 4:30
4. "Wild World" – 3:47
5. "Nobody Loves Me" – 4:51
6. "Crazy" – 4:06
7. "Two Souls" – 3:35
8. "Said Hello" – 3:34
9. "Sleep" – 5:50
10. "617" – 3:52
11. "Heaven" – 3:51
12. "All Better Days" – 3:03
13. "Slipping Into You" – 3:03
14. "Once in a While" – 5:27

== Personnel ==
BoDeans

- Kurt Neumann – vocals, electric and acoustic guitars, keyboards
- Sam Llanas – vocals, acoustic guitar
- Bob Griffin – bass guitar

Additional personnel

- Michael Ramos – accordion, Hammond B3
- Kevin Leahy - drums, vibraphone
- Nick Kitsos - drums (tracks #7, #12, #13)
