= Behind the Trap Door =

EP by T Bone Burnett
- Released: 1984
- Genre: Rock
- Label: Demon
- Producer: T Bone Burnett, Reggie Fisher, Stephen Bruton, David Miner

T Bone Burnett chronology
| Proof Through the Night (1983) | Behind the Trap Door (1984) | T-Bone Burnett (1986) |

Behind the Trap Door is an EP by T Bone Burnett, released in 1984.

== History ==
Behind the Trap Door features collaborations with Bono, Bob Neuwirth, and Richard Thompson. In the liner notes, Burnett states: "I was just starting to come out of a dark personal time, and was working these things out of my system. My original title was Beneath The Trap Door. That's how it felt."

Although the EP is out of print, all the songs were reissued on CD by Rhino Handmade on March 27, 2007. The double CD also includes the Trap Door EP and Proof Through the Night. The double CD was issued in a numbered limited edition of 5,000. A cover of the Hank Williams (as Luke the Drifter) song "Be Careful of Stones That You Throw," recorded during an early session for the album, is also included on the CD.

== Reception ==
Professional ratings
Review scores
| Source | Rating |
|---|---|
| Allmusic | 2.5/5 stars |

Music critic Brett Hartenbach of Allmusic wrote "Fans of T Bone Burnett's work will find pleasures throughout Behind the Trap Door, although it's by no means an essential piece of his catalog."

== Track listing ==
1. "Strange Combination" (Burnett) – 3:51
2. "Amnesia and Jealousy (Oh! Lana)" (Burnett, Larry Poons) – 4:51
3. "Having a Wonderful Time Wish You Were Her" (Burnett, Bono) – 4:02
4. "The Law of Average" (Burnett, Fleming, Mankiewicz) – 2:32
5. "My Life and the Women Who Lived It (No. 1)" (Burnett, Lebensohn, Bob Neuwirth) – 5:19
6. "Welcome Home, Mr. Lewis" (Burnett, Richard Thompson) – 3:34

== Personnel ==
- T Bone Burnett – vocals, guitar
- David Kemper – drums
- David Mansfield – guitar
- David Miner – bass
- Alex Acuña – percussion
- Steve Berlin –
- Billy Swan – vocals
