= Joe Dirt Car =

Live album by BoDeans
- Released: 1995
- Genre: Alternative
- Label: Slash
- Producer: The BoDeans

BoDeans chronology
| Go Slow Down (1993) | Joe Dirt Car (1995) | Blend (1996) |

Joe Dirt Car is a live two-CD album released in 1995 by the BoDeans. It was recorded in various places throughout Illinois, Wisconsin and California, among other places, between 1989 and 1994.

== Track listing ==
=== Disc 1 ===
1. "Idaho"
2. "Say About Love"
3. "Fadeaway"
4. "Paradise"
5. "Still the Night"
6. "Feed the Fire"
7. "The Ballad of Jenny Rae"
8. "Naked"
9. "Closer to Free"
10. "Good Things"
11. "You Don't Get Much"
12. "Lookin' For Me Somewhere"

=== Disc 2 ===
1. "Ooh She's My Baby" (soundcheck)
2. "Far Far Away From My Heart"
3. "Black, White, and Blood Red"
4. "She's A Runaway"
5. "Going Home"
6. "Texas Ride Song"
7. "True Devotion"
8. "Go Slow Down"
9. "Misery"
10. "I'm In Trouble Again"
11. "Walking After Midnight" (Alan Block, Donn Hecht)
12. "Good Work"

== Recording Information ==
- "Ooh (She's My Baby) recorded by Jim Scott at Summerfest, Milwaukee, WI (September 2, 1989)
- "Still The Night", "Misery", and "I'm In Trouble Again" recorded by Timothy Powell at the Riviera Theatre, Chicago, IL (September 16–17, 1989)
- "You Don't Get Much" and "Walking After Midnight" recorded by Mark McCraw at the Park West, Chicago, IL (February 24, 1992)
- "The Ballad of Jenny Rae" recorded by Timothy Powell at Maritime Days, Milwaukee, WI (September 3, 1992)
- "True Devotion" recorded by Timothy Powell at the Aragon Ballroom, Chicago, IL (November 26, 1993)
- "Say About Love", "Feed The Fire", "Closer To Free", "Good Things", "Black, White and Blood Red", and "Go Slow Down" recorded by Timothy Powell on Clinton Street, Chicago, IL (September 8, 1994)
- "Idaho", "Fadeaway", "Paradise", "Naked", "Lookin' For Me Somewhere", "Far Far Away From My Heart", "She's a Runaway", "Texas Ride Song", and "Good Work" recorded by Phil Edwards at Noe Valley Ministry, San Francisco, CA (May 28, 1994)

== Personnel ==
- Kurt Neumann - vocals, electric guitar, acoustic guitar, mixing
- Sam Llanas - vocals, acoustic guitar, harmonica
- Michael Ramos - keyboards, piano, organ, accordion
- Bob Griffin - bass guitar
- Nick Kitsos - drums, percussion
- Rafael Gayol - drums on tracks #5 (disc 1), #1 and #9 (disc 2)
- Kenny Aronoff - drums on track #7 (disc 1)
