= Mr. Sad Clown =

Studio album by BoDeans
- Released: April 6, 2010
- Genre: Alternative rock
- Label: 429
- Producer: Kurt Neumann

BoDeans chronology
Still (2008)	Mr. Sad Clown (2010)	Indigo Dreams (2011)

Professional ratings
Review scores
Source	Rating
AllMusic	3.5/5 stars

Mr. Sad Clown is a music album by the BoDeans, released on April 6, 2010. It peaked at number 172 on the Billboard 200 chart and number 26 on the Top Independent Albums chart.

== Track listing ==
1. "Stay"
2. "Shine"
3. "If..."
4. "Say Goodbye"
5. "Don't Fall Down"
6. "Cheesecake Pan"
7. "Easy Love"
8. "Today"
9. "Headed for the End of the World"
10. "Let It Ride"
11. "All the Blues"
12. "Feel Lil' Love"
13. "Almost Ready"
14. "Back Then"
15. "Gone X3"

== Personnel ==
BoDeans

- Kurt Neumann – vocals, acoustic guitar, electric guitar, keyboards, bass, drums, percussion
- Sam Llanas – vocals, acoustic guitar

Additional personnel

- Joseph Serrato - saxophone
- Michael Ramos - trumpet, Hammond B3
