= Quacky Duck and His Barnyard Friends =

- Origin: New Jersey, United States
- Genres: Country rock Pop rock
- Labels: Warner Bros. Records
- Past members: D'Andrea (Danny) Bennett; Daegal (Dae) Bennett; Curtis Fried; Gordon Javna; Jon Yaffee; David Mansfield

Quacky Duck and His Barnyard Friends was an American country rock band of the early 1970s.

It was founded by D'Andrea (Danny) Bennett and Daegal (Dae) Bennett, both sons of legendary singer Tony Bennett; they comprised the rhythm section. Other members included Curtis Fried, Gordon Javna, Jon Yaffee, and guitarist/violinist David Mansfield. The band had a modest local following in northern New Jersey and was the opening act for Gram Parsons at Max's Kansas City in New York. Their music was oriented towards lighthearted, catchy songs. The group's name evoked, as People magazine commented, "a line of bathtub toys".

The band was signed by Warner Bros. Records for $75,000 and released the album Media Push in 1974. The single "The Barnyard Song" received a smattering of airplay on WNEW-FM and the band had a national television appearance on The Mike Douglas Show. Nevertheless, they failed to gain a substantial audience and were dropped by Warner Bros.

Mansfield went on to a very successful career with Bob Dylan, The Alpha Band, and as a session musician and composer. The failure of Quacky Duck helped convince Danny Bennett that his talents lay more in business than in being a musician; as a result he later became Tony Bennett's manager and played a key role in resurrecting his father's commercial career in the 1980s and early 1990s. Dae Bennett went on to become a recording engineer. Gordon Javna became a writer and editor and oversees the popular Uncle John's Bathroom Reader series of trivia books. Fried plays bass in the Austin, Texas rock band, Cole Fried Fish.

== Members ==
- D'Andrea (Danny) Bennett
- Daegal (Dae) Bennett
- Curtis Fried
- Gordon Javna
- Jon Yaffee
- David Mansfield - guitar/violin
