= Kurt Neumann =

Kurt Neumann may refer to:

- Kurt Neumann (director) (1908–1958), film director who specialized in science fiction movies
- Kurt Neumann (musician) (born 1961), singer, guitarist, and songwriter of the roots-rock band BoDeans
