= Trap Door (EP) =

EP by T Bone Burnett
- Released: 1982
- Genre: Rock
- Label: Warner Bros.
- Producer: T Bone Burnett, Reggie Fisher

T Bone Burnett chronology
Truth Decay (1980)	Trap Door (1982)	Proof Through the Night (1983)

Trap Door is an EP by T Bone Burnett, released in 1982. It was his first release on the Warner Bros. label after leaving Takoma Records.

Although the EP is out of print, all the songs were reissued on CD by Rhino Handmade on March 27, 2007. The double CD also includes the Behind the Trap Door EP and Proof Through the Night, and was issued in a numbered limited edition of 5,000.

== Reception ==
Professional ratings
Review scores
Source	Rating
AllMusic	4.5/5 stars
Christgau's Record Guide: The '80s	A−
Tom Hull – on the Web	B+

In The Boston Phoenix, Mark Moses said that Trap Door contained Burnett's "most driving work yet," and made him "a, watch your mouth, respected singer-songwriter." "In his review, music critic Brett Hartenbach of AllMusic called the EP "Intelligent and compelling... well worth hunting down."

== Track listing ==
All tracks composed by T Bone Burnett; except where indicated.

1. "Hold on Tight"
2. "Diamonds Are a Girl's Best Friend" (Jule Styne, Leo Robin)
3. "I Wish You Could Have Seen Her Dance"
4. "A Ridiculous Man"
5. "Poetry"
6. "Trap Door"

== Personnel ==
=== Musicians ===
- T Bone Burnett – vocals, guitar
- David Kemper – drums
- David Mansfield – guitar
- David Miner – bass
- Mark Saffan – vocals
- Charles Duncan – vocals
- Tommy Funderburk – vocals
- Steven Soles – vocals
- Billy Swan – vocals

=== Production ===
- Produced by Reggie Fisher and T Bone Burnett
- Mixed and engineered by Reggie Fisher and Geoff Gillette
- Mastered by Bernie Grunman
