= Black and White (BoDeans album) =

Studio album by BoDeans
- Released: March 12, 1991
- Recorded: 1990
- Studio: Paisley Park, Chanhassen, Minnesota, US
- Genre: Alternative
- Label: Slash
- Producer: David Z

BoDeans chronology
Home (1989)	Black and White (1991)	Go Slow Down (1993)

Singles from Black and White
- 1. "Good Things" Released: 1990; 2. "Black, White and Blood Red" Released: 1991

Black and White is the fourth studio album released by the rock band BoDeans. Released in 1991, the album peaked at number 105 on the Billboard 200 chart.

== Overview ==
Despite the critical success and cult following generated by their first three albums, the band had yet to score a high-charting single and was prompted by their record label to work with a more mainstream producer. After taking a more stripped-down approach to Home, the band was ready to try a new direction and recruited David Z., best known for his work with Prince and Fine Young Cannibals, to produce their next record. In 1990, they traveled to Prince's Paisley Park Studios in Chanhassen, MN to begin tracking live on the soundstage. Rafael "Danny" Gayol, their session drummer on the Home tour, provided drums on the album and subsequently became a full member of the band. The resulting album was more synthesized and accessible than their previous releases, though it did not chart as high as expected. Nonetheless, it received mostly positive reviews and "Good Things", "True Devotion", "Paradise", and "Naked" all became staples in their live set. At the time of its release, "Good Things" received significant radio airplay and remains one of their most popular songs.

== Reception ==
Professional ratings
Review scores
Source	Rating
AllMusic	3/5 stars
Entertainment Weekly	A

Music critic Brian Mansfield, writing for AllMusic, wrote of the album: "The band hardly sounds like the roots-oriented band of their previous efforts, and Sam Llanas and Kurt Neumann sound more ambitious as songwriters... Black and White is about using individual problems as analogies to social ones. It's also about loneliness and hardship. It also didn't sell that much better (if any) than the first albums." Elysa Gardner of Entertainment Weekly, however, praised the album and wrote: "There's nothing flamboyant or ground-breaking on this fourth album from the BoDeans — just hearty, guitar-based rock & roll, fueled by hook-ridden songwriting and achingly lovely harmonies you can feel in your bones. It's a sound well suited to the lyrics on Black and White, which, though haunted by images of loneliness and desperation, are never devoid of courage or hope. [...] [T]he soulful blend of their voices — layered over instrumental arrangements that are at once tough and tender — has a wistful resonance that's probably best enjoyed in silence."

== Track listing ==
All songs written by Kurt Neumann and Sam Llanas

1. "Good Things" – 4:35
2. "True Devotion" – 4:34
3. "Black, White and Blood Red" – 4:31
4. "Paradise" – 3:40
5. "Any Given Day" – 3:51
6. "Forever on My Mind" – 4:22
7. "Naked" – 3:39
8. "Long Hard Day" – 3:25
9. "Do I Do" – 4:12
10. "Hell of a Chance" – 4:41
11. "Bad For You" – 3:59
12. "Going Home" – 3:40

== Personnel ==
BoDeans

- Kurt Neumann – vocals, electric guitar, acoustic guitar
- Sam Llanas – vocals, acoustic guitar
- Michael Ramos – piano, organ, keyboards, accordion
- Bob Griffin – bass guitar
- Rafael "Danny" Gayol – drums, percussion

Additional personnel

- The Steeles – backing vocals on track #3
