= Home (BoDeans album) =

Studio album by BoDeans
- Released: June 19, 1989
- Recorded: 1988–1989
- Genre: Alternative
- Label: Slash
- Producer: Jim Scott

BoDeans chronology
Outside Looking In (1987)	Home (1989)	Black and White (1991)

Singles from Home
- 1. "You Don't Get Much" Released: 1989

Home is the BoDeans' third studio album, and was released in 1989. It peaked at number 94 on the Billboard 200 chart.

The album's sixth track, "You Don't Get Much" appears in the 1989 movie The Wizard during the opening scene.

== Overview ==
In 1987, the band met producer/engineer Jim Scott while recording with Robbie Robertson on his debut album. They began recording with him in 1988. Following the mixed reception of Outside Looking In, the band wished to approach their next album differently. They added keyboardist Michael Ramos to their lineup and recruited Kenny Aronoff, known for his work with John Mellencamp, to record drums. Most of the tracking was done live in an abandoned shoe factory in downtown Milwaukee, a space that they had previously rented for rehearsals. Over 22 songs were recorded during this time, several of which can be found on the Leftovers rarities collection.

== Reception ==
Professional ratings
Review scores
Source	Rating
AllMusic	3.5/5 stars
Rolling Stone	3/5 stars

Music critic William Ruhlmann, writing for AllMusic, wrote of the album: "Things had changed for this band over three albums: initially, they sounded so style-bound that you wondered if any growth was possible, but with this album they were charging off in half-a -dozen directions at once." Likewise, Fred Goodman of Rolling Stone said, "That the BoDeans are able to rise above the song's one-from-column-A, one-from-column-B structure and create a deeply moving and personal piece of music bodes well for their future. Someday soon the BoDeans are gonna get to that place where they really wanna go and they'll walk in the sun."

== Track listing ==
All songs written by Kurt Neumann and Sam Llanas.

1. "When the Love is Goob (I Mean Good)" – 4:02
2. "Beautiful Rain" – 4:17
3. "Fire in the Hole" – 0:22
4. "Good Work" – 2:53
5. "No One" – 4:02
6. "You Don't Get Much" – 4:46
7. "Hand in Hand" – 4:01
8. "Worlds Away" – 3:44
9. "Far Far Away from My Heart" – 4:24
10. "Brand New" – 4:06
11. "Red River" – 4:05
12. "Beaujolais" – 4:36
13. "Sylvia" – 3:44
14. "I'll Be There (Voodoo)" – 4:03
15. "Tied Down and Chained" – 3:37

== Personnel ==
BoDeans

- Kurt Neumann – vocals, guitar, acoustic guitar, electric guitar, cello, omnichord, tambourine, percussion, bells, sound effects, background vocals
- Sam Llanas – vocals, acoustic guitar, harmonica, sound effects
- Bob Griffin – bass guitar
- Michael Ramos – strings, accordion, piano, electric piano, Clavinet, organ, keyboards

Additional personnel

- Kenny Aronoff – drums, percussion (tracks 1, 2, 4, 5, 6, 7, 15)
- Rick Jaegar – drums (10, 11)
- Bo Conlon – drums (8, 13)
- Susan Julian – piano, organ, strings (1, 2, 4, 5, 6, 7, 8, 10, 11, 15)
- Marshall Crenshaw – vocals (10)
- Bobbyzio Moore – saxophone (1)
- Derek Nakamoto – strings, cello (6, 14)
- Jim Scott – white noise (9)
