= 99 Monkeys =

Studio album by Bob Neuwirth
- Released: 1991
- Genre: Folk rock
- Length: 49:25
- Label: Gold Castle
- Producer: Steven Soles

Bob Neuwirth chronology
Back to the Front (1988)	99 Monkeys (1991)	Last Day on Earth (1994)

Professional ratings
Review scores
Source	Rating
AllMusic	4/5 stars
New Musical Express	9/10

99 Monkeys is a studio album by American singer-songwriter Bob Neuwirth. It was released in 1991 by Gold Castle Records. It was produced by Steven Soles and it features guests Katy Moffatt, Billy Swan and Peter Case. It was his first album since 1988's Back to the Front.

== Track listing ==
1. "Great Spirit" (Bob Neuwirth, Robby Romero) – 3:30
2. "Biggest Bordertown" (Neuwirth, Tom Russell) – 4:37
3. "The First Time" (Neuwirth) – 4:17
4. "Good Intentions" (Neuwirth, Lyle Lovett) – 5:39
5. "Biding Her Time" (Neuwirth) – 4:00
6. "Life Is for the Living" (Neuwirth) – 4:43
7. "Dazzled by Diamonds" (Neuwirth) – 4:06
8. "Ancient Questions (War & Peace)" (Neuwirth) – 7:52
9. "Winter in Berlin" (Neuwirth) – 3:55
10. "Cloudy Day" (Neuwirth) – 3:32 (bonus)
11. "Busted Bottle" (Neuwirth, Kris Kristofferson) – 3:14 (bonus)

== Personnel ==
- Bob Neuwirth – vocals; guitar (tracks 1–8), harmonica (track 9), cover painting

with:

- Billy Swan – guitar (tracks 2, 4), vocals (tracks 2, 4)
- Katy Moffatt – guitar (track 3), vocals (tracks 3, 6)
- David Mansfield – guitar (track 5), vocals (track 5)
- Steve Young – guitar (tracks 2, 4)
- Steven Soles – trombone (track 2), guitar (tracks 3, 6), vocals (track 4), mandolin (track 7), bass (track 9)
- Peter Case – guitar (track 8), percussion (track 9)
- Jack Sherman – bass (tracks 1, 7), guitar (track 6)
- Lisa Maxwell – tenor saxophone (track 6)
- John Bilezikjian – oud (track 8)
- Cindy & Holly – backing vocals (track 5)
- David Kemper – percussion (tracks 1, 7)
