= A Good Day to Die (album) =

Studio album by Sam Llanas
- Released: October 31, 1998
- Recorded: October 1997 – May 1998
- Studios: Hacksville, Milwaukee
- Genre: Roots rock
- Label: Llanas Music
- Producers: Sam Llanas, Gary Tanin

Sam Llanas chronology
| A Good Day to Die (1998) | A.M. (The Way Home) (2011) |

A Good Day to Die is the debut album by the American band Absinthe, released on October 31, 1998. It was promoted as the solo debut of BoDeans member Sam Llanas, who chose in part to release it under a band name due to constant mispronunciations of his last name. The band promoted the album with a North American tour.

== Production ==
Produced by Llanas and Gary Tanin, the album was recorded from October 1997 to May 1998 at the BoDeans' studio, Hacksville. Llanas was backed by Guy Hoffman on drums and Jim Eannelli on bass. He enjoyed the recording sessions, as he did not have to deal with record label interference. Llanas wrote the songs over a period of ten years. "Still Alone" was influenced by the music of Roy Orbison. The title track is about the suicide of Llanas's older brother, when Llanas was a teenager. "Bully on the Corner" recounts Llanas's experiences with a childhood bully.

== Critical reception ==
Professional ratings
Review scores
| Source | Rating |
|---|---|
| AllMusic | 3/5 stars |
| Robert Christgau | (dud) |
| The Grand Rapids Press | 2/4 stars |
| The Star-Ledger | 3/4 stars |

The Philadelphia Inquirer said, "Its bitter, downcast songs use gut-wrenchingly simple melodies to ponder commitment, brotherhood and (mostly) death." The Washington Post noted that "nearly everything on this album is overstated." Playboy stated that Llanas "has a penchant for melody that makes his songs attractive, no matter how deep he delves into psychopathology."

The Star-Ledger called the album "carefully textured roots-rock". The Daily Herald listed A Good Day to Die as the twentieth best album of 1998. The Grand Rapids Press panned the "ultra-personal, soul-cleansing melodrama". AllMusic opined that "there are a few too many slow, dark tracks to keep the listener's attention throughout the album."

== Track listing ==
| No. | Title | Length |
|---|---|---|
| 1. | "Intro" |
| 2. | "Bully on the Corner" |
| 3. | "Defeat" |
| 4. | "A Good Day to Die" |
| 5. | "Spanish Waltz" |
| 6. | "It Don't Bother Me" |
| 7. | "Messed Up Likes of Us" |
| 8. | "Still Alone" |
| 9. | "Angelina" |
| 10. | "Dying in My Dreams" |
| 11. | "What I Don't Feel" |
| 12. | "A Little Bit of Hell" |
| 13. | "Time for Us" |
