= Last Day on Earth (album) =

Studio album by John Cale and Bob Neuwirth
- Released: April 26, 1994
- Recorded: Skyline, New York City
- Genre: Art rock
- Length: 68:45
- Label: MCA
- Producers: John Cale, Bob Neuwirth

John Cale chronology
Wrong Way Up (1990)	Last Day on Earth (1994)	Walking on Locusts (1996)

Bob Neuwirth chronology
99 Monkeys (1990)	Last Day on Earth (1994)	Look Up (1996)

Professional ratings
Review scores
Source	Rating
Allmusic	4/5 stars
Rolling Stone	2/5 stars
Trouser Press	unfavourable

Last Day on Earth is a collaborative album by Welsh rock multi-instrumentalist John Cale, and American singer-songwriter Bob Neuwirth. It was released in 1994 on MCA Records. Recording of the album was completed in February 1994.

Cale later said, "Superficially, I was thinking of it as a kind of Brechtian landscape, and there were also elements of Blade Runner in it. There's a contradiction between all the longing that's going on - the lonesome kind of qualities – and the fact that it's a crowded piece, all the songs are sung by different characters."

== Track listing ==
All songs written by John Cale and Bob Neuwirth.

No.	Title	Length
1.	"Overture"	8:06
2.	"Café Shabu"	5:37
3.	"Pastoral Angst"	2:29
4.	"Who's in Charge?"	2:53
5.	"Short of Time"	3:08
6.	"Angel of Death"	4:19
7.	"Paradise Nevada"	5:33
8.	"Old China"	3:13
9.	"Ocean Life"	4:48
10.	"Instrumental"	1:57
11.	"Modern World"	5:53
12.	"Streets Come Alive"	3:22
13.	"Secrets"	4:19
14.	"Maps of the World"	4:52
15.	"Broken Hearts"	3:03
16.	"The High and Mighty Road"	5:03
Total length:		68:45

== Personnel ==
- John Cale − vocals, keyboard, viola
- Bob Neuwirth − vocals, banjo, harmonica
- Michael Brook − infinite guitar
- David Tronzo − guitar
- Eric Sanko − bass
- Gerry Hemingway − percussions, sampling
- Ben Perowsky − drums
- Jenni Muldaur − guest vocals
- Soldier String Quartet
  - Dave Soldier − violin, string arrangements
  - Lisa R. Gutkin − violin
  - Alicia A. Svigals − violin
  - Dawn M. Buckholz − cello

Technical

- Roger Moutenot – engineer, mixing
- Andy Green – production assistance
- Taki Ono, Ayako Nagano – cover design
- Tanadori Yokoo – cover art
