= The Criminal Under My Own Hat =

Studio album by T Bone Burnett
- Released: July 14, 1992
- Studio: Kiva West, Los Angeles; Ocean Way, Hollywood; Sunset Sound, Hollywood; Music Row Audio, Nashville; Sound Emporium, Nashville
- Genre: Rock
- Length: 38:14
- Label: Columbia
- Producer: T Bone Burnett, Bob Neuwirth

T Bone Burnett chronology
The Talking Animals (1987)	The Criminal Under My Own Hat (1992)	The True False Identity (2006)

The Criminal Under My Own Hat is an album by T Bone Burnett that was released in 1992. It received a Grammy Award nomination for Best Contemporary Folk Album.

== Reception ==
Professional ratings
Review scores
Source	Rating
AllMusic	4.5/5 stars

Music critic Mark Deming of AllMusic said the album was "easily T-Bone Burnett's strongest album since Proof Through the Night, and a rare pleasure for thinking music fans". Trouser Press critic Ira Robbins called the album a "huge improvement" over Burnett's previous one, observing that "The Criminal Under My Own Hat largely abandons the slick pretensions of The Talking Animals and returns to the modest rootsiness of [his 1986 self-titled album]." Despite a few weak tracks, Robbins hailed it as "Burnett’s best album or at least his most underrated one."

== Track listing ==
All tracks written by T Bone Burnett; except where indicated

1. "Over You" – 2:20
2. "Tear This Building Down" – 4:37
3. "It's Not Too Late" (Burnett, Elvis Costello, Bob Neuwirth) – 4:26
4. "Humans from Earth" – 2:48
5. "Primitives" – 3:15
6. "Criminals" – 3:44
7. "Every Little Thing" (Burnette, Neuwirth) – 2:53
8. "I Can Explain Everything" – 1:53
9. "Any Time at All" – 3:03
10. "I Can Explain Everything (Reprise)" – 3:19
11. "The Long Time Now" (Burnett, Neuwirth) – 3:00
12. "Kill Switch" – 2:55

== Personnel ==
- T Bone Burnett – vocals
- Jerry Douglas – dobro
- Edgar Meyer – bowed bass
- Van Dyke Parks – accordion
- Marc Ribot – guitar
- Billy Swan – background vocals
- Jim Keltner – drums
- David Jackson – bowed bass
- Mark O'Connor – mandolin, violin
- Dean Parks – slide guitar
- Jerry Scheff – bass
- Harry Stinson – bass drums
- Andrea Zonn – viola
- Roy Huskey, Jr. – bass
