= The B-52 Band & the Fabulous Skylarks =

Studio album by T Bone Burnett
- Released: 1972
- Genre: Rock
- Label: UNI
- Producer: T Bone Burnett, Danny Moore

T Bone Burnett chronology
The B-52 Band & the Fabulous Skylarks (1972)	Truth Decay (1980)

Professional ratings
Review scores
Source	Rating
AllMusic	2.5/5 stars
Christgau's Record Guide	C+

The B-52 Band & the Fabulous Skylarks is the first album by T Bone Burnett, released in 1972 as J. Henry Burnett. It would be eight years before he released his first solo album as T Bone Burnett. Burnett would next go on to play with Bob Dylan's Rolling Thunder Revue and then release three albums with the Alpha Band.

It was reissued in 1994 on the One Way label.

== Track listing ==
1. "We Have All Got a Past"
2. "Bring Me Back Again"
3. "Now I Don't Mind No Light Sermon"
4. "Wouldn't You Think I'd Know by Now"
5. "You Been Away for So Long"
6. "Sliding By"
7. "Hot Rod Banjo"
8. "Mama, Please Don't You Lie"
9. "Clarification Blues"
10. "Money Changer"
  1994 reissue bonus tracks:
11. "I Don't Want to Hear You Cry No More"
12. "Linda Lu"

== Personnel ==
- T Bone Burnett – vocals, guitar
- David Jackson – bass
- Matt Betton – drums
- The Fabulous Skylarks – backing vocals
- Tom Canning – piano, keyboards
- Dean Parks – guitar, saxophone
