= Twenty Twenty – The Essential T Bone Burnett =

Compilation album by T Bone Burnett
- Released: 2006
- Genre: Rock
- Label: Sony
- Producer: T Bone Burnett

T Bone Burnett chronology
The True False Identity (2006)	Twenty Twenty – The Essential T Bone Burnett (2006)	Tooth of Crime (2008)

Professional ratings
Review scores
Source	Rating
About.com	5/5 stars

Twenty Twenty is a 2006 compilation album by T Bone Burnett, chronicling Burnett's entire career, including recordings by The Coward Brothers (Burnett's collaboration with Elvis Costello) and The Alpha Band.

== Track listing ==
=== Disc 1 ===
1. "Humans from Earth" – 2:49
2. "Born in Captivity" (The Alpha Band) – 4:06
3. "Primitives" – 3:14
4. "Power of Love" – 2:55
5. "Fatally Beautiful" – 4:33
6. "Monkey Dance" – 4:25
7. "The Long Time Now" – 2:59
8. "River of Love" – 3:34
9. "Shut It Tight" – 2:56
10. "Tear This Building Down" – 4:35
11. "The Murder Weapon" – 5:14
12. "Image" – 4:02
13. "Kill Zone" – 4:05
14. "Hula Hoop" – 3:25
15. "Criminals" – 3:44
16. "Diamonds Are a Girl's Best Friend" – 3:04
17. "No Love at All" – 2:57
18. "When the Night Falls" – 4:23
19. "Over You" – 2:21
20. "The Bird That I Held in My Hand" – 3:10

=== Disc 2 ===
1. "Every Little Thing" – 2:56
2. "House of Mirrors" – 3:34
3. "The Dogs" (The Alpha Band) – 4:21
4. "Shake Yourself Loose" – 3:04
5. "Kill Switch" – 2:56
6. "I Wish You Could Have Seen Her Dance" – 3:48
7. "Hefner and Disney" – 3:53
8. "Drivin Wheel" – 3:13
9. "Boomerang" – 4:19
10. "Euromad" – 4:12
11. "Strange Combination" – 3:50
12. "East of East" (The Alpha Band) – 3:11
13. "The People's Limousine" (The Coward Brothers) – 3:41
14. "Trap Door" – 4:11
15. "I'm Coming Home" – 4:02
16. "It's Not Too Late" – 4:27
17. "Song to a Dead Man" – 4:09
18. "After All These Years" – 3:12
19. "Man, Don't Dog Your Woman" – 3:44
20. "Bon Temps Rouler" – 4:58
