= Closer to Free =

1993 single by BoDeans

Single by BoDeans

from the album Go Slow Down
- Released: 1993
- Length: 3:09
- Label: Slash; Reprise
- Songwriters: Kurt Neumann; Sam Llanas
- Producer: T-Bone Burnett

BoDeans singles chronology
"Feed the Fire" (1993)	"Closer to Free" (1993)	"Hurt by Love" (1996)

"Closer to Free" is a song by American rock band BoDeans from their fifth studio album, Go Slow Down (1993). It is the band's biggest hit, peaking at number 16 on the US Billboard Hot 100, number 11 in Australia, and number one in Canada after its re-release in 1995. It was featured as the theme of the TV series Party of Five.

== Track listings ==
US 7-inch, CD, and cassette single (1995, 1996)

1. "Closer to Free" (studio album version) – 3:09
2. "Closer to Free" (live album version) – 3:54

Australian CD single (1994)

1. "Closer to Free"
2. "Texas Ride Song"
3. "Idaho"

European and Australian CD single (1996)

1. "Closer to Free"
2. "She's a Runaway"
3. "Don't Be Lonely"

== Charts ==
=== Weekly charts ===
Chart (1996)	Peak position
Australia (ARIA)	11
Canada Top Singles (RPM)	1
Canada Adult Contemporary (RPM)	16
US Billboard Hot 100	16
US Adult Contemporary (Billboard)	31
US Adult Top 40 (Billboard)	3
US Top 40/Mainstream (Billboard)	6
US Cash Box Top 100	11

=== Year-end charts ===
Chart (1996)	Position
Australia (ARIA)	85
Canada Top Singles (RPM)	35
US Billboard Hot 100	67
US Adult Top 40 (Billboard)	23
US Top 40/Mainstream (Billboard)	26

== Release history ==
Region	Date	Format(s)	Label(s)	Ref.
United States	1993	Radio	Slash; Reprise	
United States (re-release)	November 28, 1995	Contemporary hit radio	Slash; Reprise	

== In popular culture ==
"Closer to Free" was featured as the theme of the TV series Party of Five and was featured on the show's accompanying soundtrack. The song was also played in the 1994 film Milk Money and during the opening credits of the 1995 film Heavyweights. The song was also used in the TV series Melrose Place in episode "St. Valentine's Day Massacre" and Riverdale in episode "Chapter Seventy-Seven: Climax".
