= The True False Identity =

Studio album by T Bone Burnett
- Released: May 16, 2006
- Genre: Rock
- Length: 59:30
- Label: DMZ/Columbia
- Producer: T Bone Burnett

T Bone Burnett chronology
The Criminal Under My Own Hat (1992)	The True False Identity (2006)	Twenty Twenty – The Essential T Bone Burnett (2006)

The True False Identity is the sixth studio album by T Bone Burnett, released in 2006.

Professional ratings
Review scores
Source	Rating
Allmusic	3.5/5 stars
Being There	4/5 stars
Music Box	4.5/5 stars

== Track listing ==
All tracks composed by T Bone Burnett, except where indicated.

1. "Zombieland" (Burnett, Turner Stephen Bruton) - 5:57
2. "Palestine Texas" - 4:47
3. "Seven Times Hotter Than Fire" - 4:41
4. "There Would Be Hell to Pay" - 5:10
5. "Every Time I Feel the Shift" - 6:52
6. "I'm Going On a Long Journey Never to Return" – 5:21
7. "Hollywood Mecca of the Movies" (Burnett, Marc Ribot) - 3:26
8. "Fear Country" (Burnett, Bob Neuwirth, Donnie Fritts) - 6:15
9. "Baby Don't You Say You Love Me" - 4:08
10. "Earlier Baghdad (The Bounce)" - 4:55
11. "Blinded by the Darkness" - 5:18
12. "Shaken Rattled and Rolled" - 2:40

== Personnel ==
- T Bone Burnett – vocals, guitar, six–string bass
- Marc Ribot – guitars
- Dennis Crouch – bass guitar
- Keith Ciancia – piano, keyboards
- Jim Keltner – drums
- Carla Azar – drums
- Bill Maxwell – drums
- Jay Bellerose – drums
- Sam Phillips – backing vocals
- Daniel Moore – backing vocals
- Buzz Clifford – backing vocals
- Reese Clifford - backing vocals
