= Love & Hope & Sex & Dreams =

Studio album by BoDeans
- Released: April 16, 1986
- Recorded: November 1 – December 31, 1985
- Genre: Rock
- Length: 41:40
- Label: Slash/Warner Bros.
- Producer: T Bone Burnett

BoDeans chronology
Love & Hope & Sex & Dreams (1986)	Outside Looking In (1987)

Singles from Love & Hope & Sex & Dreams
- 1. "Fadeaway" Released: 1986

Love & Hope & Sex & Dreams is the debut studio album by the American rock band BoDeans, released on April 16, 1986, on Slash/Warner Bros. The album was produced by T Bone Burnett. The album title comes from the lyrics to the Rolling Stones song "Shattered." It reached number 115 on the Billboard 200 chart.

== Overview ==
In 1985, the band was signed to Slash/Warner Bros and traveled to Los Angeles to begin work on their debut record shortly thereafter. The album was recorded at Sunset Sound with T Bone Burnett along with engineers David Tickle and Tchad Blake. Due to his in-demand role as a producer, Burnett was often absent for days at a time during tracking and would return to check the band's progress and give direction. There was some tension during the sessions over how elaborate the production should be. Burnett believed that some of the band's ideas did not fit the simplicity of their songs. In addition, the band were running up high studio costs and was forced to complete the album before they felt it was finished. Despite this, the band were happy with the album and it has often been regarded as their finest work.

== Reception ==
Professional ratings
Review scores
Source	Rating
AllMusic	4.5/5 stars
Christgau's Record Guide	B−
Rolling Stone	(average)

AllMusic critic Mark Deming wrote: "While this music was simple at heart, the BoDeans' passion and sincerity gave it strength, and T Bone Burnett's production allowed this band to sound as big as all outdoors. The BoDeans would enjoy greater success down the road, but they never made an album as powerful and satisfying as Love & Hope & Sex & Dreams, where their hearts and their guitars were in perfect sync."

== Track listing ==
All songs by Kurt Neumann and Sam Llanas unless otherwise noted

=== Original release ===
Side One:

1. "She's a Runaway" – 3:36
2. "Fadeaway" – 4:25
3. "Still the Night" (Neumann, Llanas, Guy Hoffman) – 4:02
4. "Rickshaw Riding" – 4:55
5. "Angels" – 3:35

Side Two:

1. "Misery" – 4:38
2. "The Strangest Kind" (Neumann, Llanas, John Sieger) – 3:40
3. "Say You Will" – 4:04
4. "Ultimately Fine" – 2:18
5. "That's All" – 3:25
6. "Lookin' for Me Somewhere" – 3:02

=== 2009 deluxe edition additional tracks ===
1. "Try and Try"
2. "Sail Away" (Demo)
3. "Amen" (Demo)
4. "Small Town Ways" (Demo)
5. "Janey" (New Recording)
6. "Turn Your Radio On" (Demo)

=== Disc 2: DVD ===
Live at First Avenue, Minneapolis, MN (7/15/85)

1. "Small Town Ways"
2. "The Strangest Kind"
3. "Oh Stella"
4. "Don't You Just Know"
5. "Rickshaw Riding"
6. "Still the Night"
7. "Amen"
8. "Janey"
9. "Be My Girl"
10. "Say You Will"
11. "Heart of America"
12. "Misery"
13. "Not So Long Ago"
14. "She's a Runaway"
15. "Try and Try"
16. "Cella"
17. "Home Again"

== Personnel ==
BoDeans

- Kurt Neumann – vocals, guitars
- Sam Llanas – vocals, acoustic guitar
- Guy Hoffman – drums, (vocal-track 3)
- Bob Griffin – bass

Additional musicians

- T Bone Burnett – acoustic guitar (tracks 3 and 10)
- Alex Acuña – percussion
- Mitchell Froom – organ

Technical

- Matt Mahurin - cover photography
