= The Talking Animals =

Studio album by T Bone Burnett
- Released: 1988
- Studio: Sunset Sound; Sounset Sound Factory
- Genre: Rock and Roll
- Length: 40:31
- Label: Columbia
- Producer: David Rhodes; T Bone Burnett

T Bone Burnett chronology
T-Bone Burnett (1986)	The Talking Animals (1988)	The Criminal Under My Own Hat (1992)

Professional ratings
Review scores
Source	Rating
AllMusic	3/5 stars
Robert Christgau	B−
The Encyclopedia of Popular Music	3/5 stars
MusicHound Rock: The Essential Album Guide	2.5/5 stars
The Rolling Stone Album Guide	4/5 stars

The Talking Animals is an album by T Bone Burnett, released in 1988.

The guest musicians include Peter Case, Bono, and Tonio K, among others.

== Reception ==
Brett Hartenbach of AllMusic thought that "even with a few less than stellar songs, The Talking Animals is a strong, inspired record." Trouser Press called the album "all in all, worth hearing, though one wishes this talented jerk weren’t so impressed with himself." Robert Christgau wrote: "I hate to let the cat out of the bag, but this guy is pretentious."

== Track listing ==
All songs by T Bone Burnett unless otherwise noted.

=== Side one ===
1. "The Wild Truth" – 3:38
2. "Monkey Dance" – 4:43
3. "Image" – 4:02
4. "Dance, Dance, Dance" – 2:45
5. "The Killer Moon" (Burnett, M. Burnett, Peter Case) – 5:00

=== Side two ===
1. "Relentless" – 3:24
2. "Euromad" – 4:21
3. "Purple Heart" (Bono, Burnett) – 4:36
4. "You Could Look It Up" – 2:41
5. "The Strange Case of Frank Cash and the Morning Paper" (Burnett, Tonio K) – 5:25

== Personnel ==
=== Musicians ===
- T Bone Burnett – guitar
- David Rhodes – guitar
- Mickey Curry – drums
- Tony Levin – bass
- Jerry Scheff – bass
- Tom "T-Bone" Wolk – bass
- Mitchell Froom – harmonium, electric piano, clavinet
- Tom Canning – piano
- Sexteto Mayor

Singers:

- T Bone Burnett
- Cait O'Riordan
- Ruben Blades
- Ludmilla
- Peter Case
- Bono
- Tonio K
- David Rhodes

=== Production ===
- Produced by David Rhodes and T Bone Burnett
- Recorded by Tchad Blake at Sunset Sound and Sunset Sound Factory with Mike Kloster
- Mastered by Bob Ludwig
