= Tooth of Crime =

Studio album by T Bone Burnett
- Released: May 13, 2008
- Genre: Rock
- Length: 39:23
- Label: Nonesuch
- Producer: T Bone Burnett

T Bone Burnett chronology
Twenty Twenty - The Essential T Bone Burnett (2006)	Tooth of Crime (2008)

Tooth of Crime is an album by T Bone Burnett. The album is a selection of music written by Burnett for the 1996 production of Sam Shepard's play The Tooth of Crime.

== Reception ==
Professional ratings
Review scores
Source	Rating
Allmusic	4/5 stars
Boston Phoenix	3.5/4 stars

Music critic Mark Deming of Allmusic praised the album and wrote "Tooth of Crime is a smart, absorbing, and beautifully disquieting collection of songs that could have come from no one else but T Bone Burnett, and it shows that one of America's best songwriters may be working at a very deliberate pace but he still has some remarkable things left to tell us."

== Track listing ==
1. "Anything I Say Can and Will Be Used Against You" – 4:02
2. "Dope Island" – 4:16
3. "The Slowdown" – 4:43
4. "Blind Man" – 1:22
5. "Kill Zone" – 4:19
6. "The Rat Age" – 5:30
7. "Swizzle Stick" – 5:10
8. "Telepresence (Make the Metal Scream)" – 3:06
9. "Here Come the Philistines" – 3:33
10. "Sweet Lullaby" – 3:24

== Personnel ==
- T-Bone Burnett – vocals, guitar, six-string bass, piano
- Sam Phillips – vocals, backing vocals
- Marc Ribot – banjo, guitar
- Greg Leisz – steel guitar
- Jon Brion – Chamberlin, baritone guitar
- J. D. Foster – bass
- John E. Abbey – bass
- Sim Cain – drums
- Jagoda – drums
- Jim Keltner – drums, percussion
- Joe Sublett – tenor saxophone
- Greg Smith – baritone saxophone, bass saxophone
- Ken Kugler – trombone, bass trombone, tuba
- Darrell Leonard – trombonium, pocket trumpet
- Les Lovitt – flugelhorn
- Dan Kelly – French horn
- Suzette Moriarty – French horn
- Kurt Snyder – French horn
- Miguel Ferrer – backing vocals
- Leslie Kahn – backing vocals
- David Poe – backing vocals

Production

- T-Bone Burnett – producer
- Mike Piersante – engineer, mixing
- Susan Rogers – engineer, mixing
- Cappy Japange – assistant engineer
- Emile Kelman – assistant engineer
- Gavin Lurssen – mastering
