= BoDeans =

American rock band

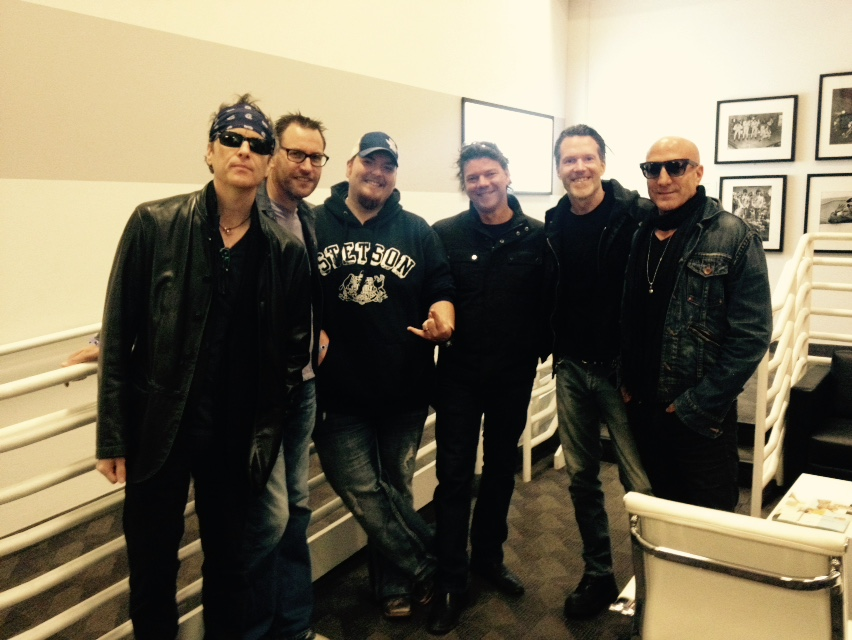
- BoDeans in 2014

Background information
- Origin: Waukesha, Wisconsin, U.S.
- Genres: Roots rock; heartland rock; alternative rock; pop rock
- Years active: 1983–present
- Labels: F&A Slash; 429; Zoë; He & He; Megaforce/MRI
- Members: Kurt Neumann; Stefano Intelisano; James Hertless; Brian Ferguson; Kenny Aronoff; Glenn Fukunaga; Bukka Allen
- Past members: See Member Section for former members.
- Website: bodeans.com

BoDeans is an American rock band formed in Waukesha, Wisconsin, in 1983. The band's sound encompasses multiple rock genres, including roots rock, heartland rock, and alternative rock. The band's biggest hit is "Closer to Free" (1993), which became the theme song to Party of Five. BoDeans has been described as "one of the most successful, and best known, bands to come out of the Milwaukee area". The band is included in a permanent installation on artists from the Midwest at the Rock and Roll Hall of Fame.

== History ==
=== 1980s ===
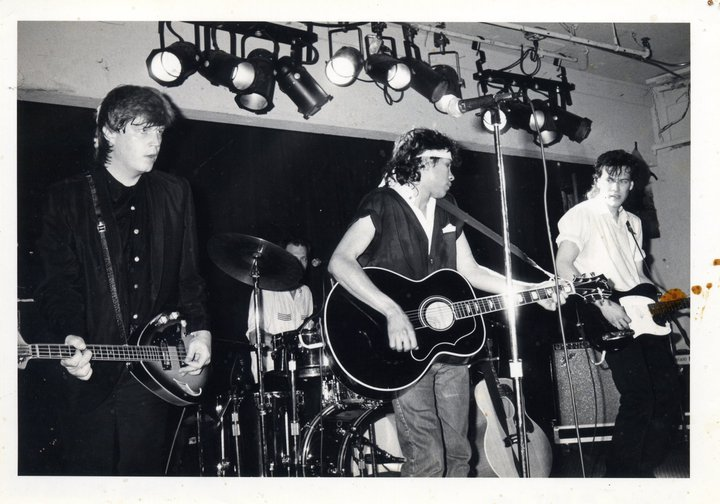
BoDeans in 1986 (left to right: Bob Griffin, Guy Hoffman, Sam Llanas, Kurt Neumann)

Kurt Neumann and Sam Llanas met at Waukesha South High School in 1977. After discovering that they had similar music interests, they began writing songs together. Llanas entered college, but eventually left after Neumann convinced him to pursue a music career together. At this time Neumann did not sing much, and considered himself to be primarily a drummer, while Llanas had little experience as a guitar player. However, the two decided to get serious about music and both began to sing and play guitar under the name Da BoDeans in 1980.

The BoDeans formed in 1983 in Waukesha, Wisconsin. In April 1983, the BoDeans began playing around Milwaukee's East Side music scene, with a hired drummer and bass player. The band practiced in the garage of Mark McCraw, a mutual friend who soon became their manager and provided financial support during their early years. The band lost its rhythm section later that year, but continued to perform live as a duo and used the recording studio at McCraw's university to record demos on which Llanas and Neumann played all the instruments. In 1984, drummer Guy Hoffman joined the band. The trio's first recorded song, "Sally", appeared on the first volume of the Milwaukee Sampler compilation released by Breezeway Records. To compensate for the lack of a bass player, Neumann modified his Fender Esquire with two additional pickups intended to capture solid low-end frequencies. After the trio became popular around Milwaukee, they added bassist Bob Griffin in 1985.

Later in 1985, the quartet received interest from multiple major labels and chose to sign a contract with Slash/Warner Records. After signing, the label suggested that they shorten their name to simply BoDeans. Under the guidance of producer T Bone Burnett, they entered Hollywood's Sunset Sound Factory in October to record their first album. Burnett focused on capturing the band's natural sound without many additional overdubs. The band later expressed their regret of not being able to spend more time on the production, but high studio costs kept the sessions concise. Love & Hope & Sex & Dreams, the band's critically acclaimed debut album, was released in 1986.

In January 1987, a Rolling Stone reader poll voted BoDeans the Best New American Band. Early that year, they traveled to Los Angeles to work with producer Mike Campbell, but the sessions were shelved after disagreement arose over the album's sound. Campbell wished for the album to resemble Tom Petty's brand of 1960's rock. The band, however, felt that this style did not fit their music and instead wanted a state-of-the-art production.

Instead, they got Talking Heads member Jerry Harrison to produce their second album. Outside Looking In was released in October 1987 and featured a more modern 80's-rock sound than its roots-influenced predecessor. At the time, the band wished to break past the "roots" label with a state-of-the-art production, but in retrospect, they felt that the album was not able to capture the true essence of the band. The album's lead single, "Only Love", peaked at number 16 on the US Mainstream Rock charts. In support of the album, the band toured extensively with U2 on The Joshua Tree Tour. That year, the band also contributed to Robbie Robertson's debut solo album alongside U2 and Peter Gabriel.

In 1989, the band's third album, titled Home, was released. It was more reminiscent of their rootsy debut, but showed a diverse range of influences including Motown, U2-inspired arena rock, and heartland rock. The songs “You Don’t Get Much” and “Red River” were used in the movie The Wizard that same year.

=== 1990s ===
In 1991, in search of a different take on their music, the band began recording with David Z (producer and sideman of Prince) at Paisley Park Studios. The band released its fourth studio album, Black and White, that year. The album's electronic-influenced sound was a sharp departure from most of their previous efforts, with more emphasis on synthesizers, drum machines, and processed guitar tones. The album also explored darker and grander lyrical themes. Although not a single, the album's first track, "Good Things," achieved some success and became one of the band's best-known songs. The rebellious and political "Black, White, and Blood Red" was the only single released from the album; it did not perform well in comparison to the band's previous songs that made the charts.

After Black & White, the band decided to shift their focus to making the album that pleased them instead of searching for a hit. For their 1993 album Go Slow Down, the band reunited with T-Bone Burnett and took a more homemade approach, with Neumann playing many of the instruments himself. Unlike their previous album, Go Slow Down was more acoustic and marked their transition into '90s alternative rock.

The first song from the album, "Closer to Free," brought Bodeans to a much larger audience after it was selected as the theme song to the television series Party of Five in 1994. (In 1999, the band would perform a cover of The Beatles' "I've Just Seen a Face" as the theme song for the show's short-lived spinoff, Time of Your Life.) Due to the newfound exposure, "Closer to Free" became the group's biggest pop hit, peaking at number 16 on the U.S. Billboard Hot 100 in 1996.

In 1995, Joe Dirt Car, a two-CD live set, was released. The album included live tracks recorded between 1989 and 1995, some of which were acoustic. In 1996, the band released Blend, produced by Greg Goldman. The single "Hurt By Love" achieved minor chart success, while the song "Hey Pretty Girl" was used in an episode of Dawson's Creek.

Around this time, the band became entangled in legal battles with longtime manager Mark McCraw, who had gone on strike stating that he was entitled to partial copyright ownership of the band's first two albums.

=== 2000s ===
In 2001, the 17-song compilation The Best Of BoDeans—Slash and Burn was released on London/Slash/Rhino.

In 2003, the band terminated their former management contract and signed with Rounder Records. The following year, the band released their seventh album, Resolution, on Rounder/Zoe. BoDeans released an album entitled Still in March 2008.

=== 2010s ===
The band's ninth studio album, Mr. Sad Clown, was released on April 6, 2010. Similar to their 1993 release, Neumann produced and played most of the instruments on the album in his home studio. Though critics lauded the album for its homemade approach, reviews were mixed due to the overall melancholy theme. The album features some of Neumann's most personal songwriting.

The band released its tenth studio album, titled Indigo Dreams, on July 26, 2011.

In August 2011, Llanas failed to arrive in Colorado for BoDeans performances in Denver, Boulder, and Winter Park, CO and instead sent a text message to several band and crew members notifying them of his departure from the band. The band stated that it would continue without Llanas, with the band's guitar technician Jake Owen filling in. In June 2018, Kurt Neumann's stepdaughter, Tessa Neumann, accused Llanas of sexually abusing her from 2001 though 2007 while she was a minor. Llanas denied the allegations.

The band's eleventh studio album, entitled American Made, was released in June 2012. On March 26, the album's first single, "All The World", was released.

In November 2012, the band announced the upcoming release of Amped Across America, a double live album recorded at several venues from the American Made tour.

In October 2014, Neumann announced the release of the band's 12th studio album, entitled I Cant Stop.

In June 2016, the band released the single "My Hometown" from their upcoming 13th studio album, Thirteen. The song was one of several songs by the BoDeans to be used in the sitcom The Ranch, produced by Netflix.

The Milwaukee County Historical Society opened a BoDeans exhibit to celebrate the release of the album.

The band also released BoDeans Original Ginger Brew, a beer made by Sprecher Brewery in celebration of the 30th anniversary of their debut album.

In November 2016, the band released a Christmas record, “The Night Divine”.

In April 2017, the band released Thirteen.

== Legacy ==
BoDeans' biggest hit is "Closer to Free" (1993), which was used as the theme song to the television show Party of Five.

The music of BoDeans spans multiple rock genres, including roots rock, heartland rock, and alternative rock. The band has been described as "one of the most successful, and best known, bands to come out of the Milwaukee area".

BoDeans is included in a permanent installation on artists from the Midwest at the Rock and Roll Hall of Fame.

== Discography ==
- Love & Hope & Sex & Dreams (1986)
- Outside Looking In (1987)
- Home (1989)
- Black and White (1991)
- Go Slow Down (1993)
- Joe Dirt Car (1995)
- Blend (1996)
- The Leftovers (2003)
- Resolution (2004)
- Homebrewed - Live from the Pabst (2005)
- Still (2008)
- Mr. Sad Clown (2010)
- Indigo Dreams (2011)
- American Made (2012)
- Amped Across America (2013)
- I Cant Stop (2015)
- Thirteen (2017)
- 2020 Vision (2020)
- 4 the Last Time (2022)

== Tours ==
- American Made (2012)
- 40th anniversary tour (2026)
