= The Alpha Band =

American rock band (1976–1979)

- Origin: United States
- Genres: Rock
- Years active: 1976–1979
- Label: Arista Records
- Spinoff of: Rolling Thunder Revue
- Past members: T-Bone Burnett; Steven Soles; David Mansfield

The Alpha Band was an American rock band, formed in July 1976 from the remnants of Bob Dylan's Rolling Thunder Revue.

Band members were T-Bone Burnett, Steven Soles, and David Mansfield, plus sidemen who differed from record to record and included: David Kemper (later drummer for Bob Dylan and Jerry Garcia Band); gospel musician Andraé Crouch; and former Beatle Ringo Starr.

The band produced three albums, particularly notable for their intelligent cultural critique. The members of the band, especially Burnett and Mansfield, are known for their important roles as producers of other people's albums subsequently.

== Discography ==
=== Albums ===
- The Alpha Band, 1976
- Spark in the Dark, 1977
- The Statue Makers of Hollywood, 1978
- The Arista Albums, 2005, two-CD set compiling all three LPs
