= Steven Soles =

American musician

Steven Soles is an American singer-songwriter, record producer, and guitarist.

Known also as J. Steven Soles, he was asked by Bob Dylan to join the band for his 1975–1976 "Rolling Thunder Revue" tour, he appeared on Dylan's album "Desire" and he also played with Dylan on Street Legal and the following tour, including the live album Bob Dylan at Budokan. When that tour ended, Soles and two other members of Dylan's band, T Bone Burnett and David Mansfield, formed The Alpha Band.

Like most of the musicians in The Rolling Thunder Revue, Soles appeared in the 1978 film, Renaldo and Clara, in which he played the rôle of Ramon.

During its time, The Alpha Band released three albums, The Alpha Band in 1977, Spark in the Dark in the same year and The Statue Makers of Hollywood in 1978.

After its breakup, Steven Soles went on to a distinguished production career, working with artists such as Roy Orbison, Lisa Marie Presley, John Mellencamp, Counting Crows, Elton John, Elvis Costello and k.d. lang. He won two Grammy Awards and an Academy Award.

Steven Soles released two solo albums of original material, The Promise in 1980, and 1982's Walk By Love. Allmusic gave the first an album rating of three stars and the second four stars, commenting of Walk By Love that, "more commercial than The Promise, this second solo album features catchier songs and fuller pop arrangements." Allmusic pointed out that the albums had both been critically acclaimed, "if little heard".

Soles went on to produce or perform on albums by Dylan, Burnett, The Washington Squares, Bob Neuwirth, Steve Poltz, Peter Case, Elvis Costello, Roger McGuinn, Don McLean, The Monkees, The 77s, Olivia Newton-John, Roy Orbison, Tonio K, Victoria Williams, Steve Scott and others.

He was part of the highly acclaimed Cinemax special Roy Orbison and Friends, A Black and White Night. As J. Steven Soles, he is credited as "Music Supervisor" in the movie Space Truckers (Stuart Gordon, 1996).

Soles was married to actress P. J. Soles from 1973 to 1975.
