= David Mansfield =

American musician and composer (born 1956)

- Born: September 13, 1956 (age 70)
- Occupations: Musician, composer
- Instruments: Violin, guitar, mandolin
- Years active: 1974–present
- Spouse: Maggie Greenwald (m. 1994)
- Past members: Bob Dylan, The Alpha Band, Bruce Hornsby and the Range, Quacky Duck and His Barnyard Friends

David Mansfield (born September 13, 1956) is an American musician and composer.

Mansfield was raised in Leonia, New Jersey. His father, Newton Mansfield was a first violinist in the New York Philharmonic. David played guitar, pedal steel guitar and fiddle in his first band, called Quacky Duck and His Barnyard Friends, which also included two sons of Tony Bennett.

Bob Dylan asked Mansfield to tour with him on his 1975 Rolling Thunder Revue tour; he remained in Dylan's band through their 1978 world tour.

After the Revue ended in 1976, Mansfield and two other members of Dylan's band, T-Bone Burnett and Steven Soles, formed The Alpha Band. The band released three albums, The Alpha Band in 1977, Spark in the Dark in 1977, and The Statue Makers of Hollywood in 1978. While Mansfield in 1978 was working on the album, The Statue Makers of Hollywood with The Alpha Band, he appeared as a guitarist on Desire Wire by a struggling pop/rock artist Cindy Bullens that same year.

Since The Alpha Band broke up, Mansfield has continued to work as a musician in sessions for Dylan, Burnett, Johnny Cash, Roger McGuinn, The Roches, Loudon Wainwright III, Rufus Wainwright and others. In 1986, he was an initial member of Bruce Hornsby and the Range,

Mansfield composed the music for the 1980 film Heaven's Gate – he appeared in the movie, playing the fiddle on roller skates – and has since gone on to write scores for a number of other films, including others directed by Heaven's Gate's Michael Cimino. Mansfield cobbled together the soundtrack album for Songcatcher. He won the Golden Osella for Deep Crimson. He also composed the music for the soundtrack to The Ballad of Little Jo (1993), a movie written and directed by Maggie Greenwald, whom he married in 1994. Together they adopted two children. Maisie Mansfield-Greenwald (1997) and Lulu Mansfield-Greenwald (2000). He also composed the score with Van Dyke Parks for Walter Hill's Broken Trail (2006), and they were nominated for a Primetime Emmy Award for Outstanding Music Composition for a Miniseries, Movie or a Special (Original Dramatic Score).

== Filmography ==
- 1980 Heaven's Gate
- 1985 Year of the Dragon
- 1986 Club Paradise
- 1987 The Sicilian
- 1989 Miss Firecracker
- 1990 Desperate Hours
- 1991 Late for Dinner
- 1992 Me and Veronica
- 1993 The Ballad of Little Jo
- 1995 Outlaws: The Legend of O.B. Taggart
- 1996 Deep Crimson
- 1997 Floating
- 1997 Road Ends
- 1997 The Apostle
- 1998 El evangelio de las maravillas
- 1998 Dark Harbor
- 1999 Tumbleweeds
- 1999 No One Writes to the Colonel
- 2000 Such Is Life
- 2000 Ropewalk
- 2000 A Good Baby
- 2000 Songcatcher
- 2002 Divine Secrets of the Ya-Ya Sisterhood
- 2003 Flora's Garment Bursting Into Bloom
- 2005 Transamerica
- 2006 Stephanie Daley
- 2006 Diggers
- 2006 El carnaval de Sodoma
- 2007 Then She Found Me
- 2008 The Guitar
- 2011 Certainty
- 2011 The Reasons of the Heart
- 2013 The Last Keepers
- 2016 Sophie and the Rising Sun
- 2019 Devil Between the Legs
- 2023 Killers of the Flower Moon
