= Bob Neuwirth =

American folk singer (1939–2022)

Background information
- Born: Robert John Neuwirth; June 20, 1939; Akron, Ohio, U.S.
- Died: May 18, 2022 (aged 82) Santa Monica, California, U.S.
- Occupations: Singer-songwriter record producer
- Instruments: Vocals, guitar, banjo
- Years active: 1960s–2022
- Labels: Asylum; Gold Castle; Watermelon; Dreamsville
- Website: www.bobneuwirth.com

Robert John Neuwirth (June 20, 1939 – May 18, 2022) was an American folk singer, songwriter, record producer and visual artist. He was noted for being the road manager and associate of Bob Dylan as well as the co-writer of Janis Joplin's hit song "Mercedes Benz".

Neuwirth was portrayed by Will Harrison in the 2024 film A Complete Unknown.

== Early life ==
Neuwirth was born in Akron, Ohio on June 20, 1939. His father, Robert, was employed as an engineer; his mother, Clara Irene (Fischer), worked as a design engineer. Neuwirth first started painting when he was seven years old. He initially studied at Ohio University, before moving to Boston in 1959 when he was awarded an arts scholarship to study at the School of the Museum of Fine Arts at Tufts. After dropping out of college, he briefly relocated to Paris and took up the banjo, guitar, and harmonica during this time. This eventually paved the way to the folk scene of the early 1960s in Cambridge, Massachusetts. He also went busking with Ramblin' Jack Elliott during his sojourn in the French capital. Neuwirth later went back to Boston and was employed at an art supply store.

== Career ==
Neuwirth first met Bob Dylan in 1961, at the inaugural Indian Neck Folk Festival held in Branford, Connecticut. He soon became Dylan's friend and associate, as well as his road manager. Neuwirth consequently accompanied Dylan on his England tour in 1965, the Newport Folk Festival that same year that saw the Electric Dylan controversy, and featured alongside him in D. A. Pennebaker's documentary Dont Look Back (1967).

According to Neuwirth, Dylan planned to collaborate on a film with Warhol superstar Edie Sedgwick, who had signed with Dylan's manager, Albert Grossman. Neuwirth also took part in the Andy Warhol, Up-Tight multimedia event, which later evolved into the Exploding Plastic Inevitable. After Sedgwick left Warhol's circle, Neuwirth made a short "Chaplinesque, satirical movie" with her on Easter Sunday in 1966.

Neuwirth pulled back from Dylan's circle after the latter's motorcycle accident in 1966 and subsequent withdrawal from public life. However, he returned in time to help assemble the backing band for the Rolling Thunder Revue tour ten years later. He also appeared in Dylan's own self-referential romantic fantasy/tour film Renaldo and Clara (1978). The lower half of him appears behind Dylan in Daniel Kramer's front cover photo for the album Highway 61 Revisited.

With Janis Joplin and poet Michael McClure, Neuwirth co-wrote the song "Mercedes Benz" in August 1970, while improvising during a drinking session at a bar in Port Chester, New York. He scribbled the lyrics onto a napkin, which Joplin sang at her Capitol Theatre show that same night and then recorded a cappella just three days before she died. Neuwirth also introduced Kris Kristofferson to Joplin, who would have a major posthumous hit single with Kristofferson's song "Me and Bobby McGee", which Neuwirth first played for Joplin. Colin Irwin wrote:

Painter, road manager, sidekick, confidante, henchman, poet, underground cult hero, womanizer, party organizer, self-appointed king of cool, and baiter-in-chief of Baez, Donovan, and any other unfortunate who wound up in the line of fire of his sledgehammer jibes, Neuwirth went on to become a film-maker and a credible singer-songwriter in his own right, co-writing the wonderful "Mercedes Benz" with his friend Janis Joplin.

After moving to Los Angeles during the 1970s, Neuwirth released his debut album Bob Neuwirth (1974) with Asylum Records. It included guest artists such as Kris Kristofferson, Booker T. Jones, Rita Coolidge, Chris Hillman, Cass Elliot, Dusty Springfield, Don Everly, Richie Furay, and Iain Matthews. It was not commercially successful, in part because he declined to publicize it extensively. The album eventually became a cult favorite and a proposal to reissue it was in place at the time of Neuwirth's death. Fourteen years later, he released his second album, Back to the Front, which was received more positively by critics. His third album, a collaboration with John Cale titled Last Day on Earth (1994), was described by The Daily Telegraph as "ambitious, experimental and doom-laden". While embarking on a national tour of the U.S., he recorded his fourth solo album, Look Up (1996), at the residences of friends such as Patti Smith, Bernie Leadon, and Elliott Murphy. He subsequently travelled to Havana to collaborate with José María Vitier on Havana Midnight (1999), which was characterized as a wholehearted effort at fusion between folk and blues with Cuban music.

Neuwirth was involved in concerts at a church in Brooklyn and the Royal Festival Hall in 1999, which were organized by Hal Willner as a tribute to the Anthology of American Folk Music released almost 50 years before. A year later, Neuwirth produced the documentary Down from the Mountain, with Pennebaker as one of the directors and highlighting artists whose music was included in O Brother, Where Art Thou? by the Coen brothers. He also took part in music projects involving various artists at the turn of the millennium, namely Por Vida: A Tribute to the Songs of Alejandro Escovedo and Rogue's Gallery: Pirate Ballads, Sea Songs, and Chanteys. He was interviewed by Martin Scorsese for No Direction Home (2005), and featured in Rolling Thunder Revue: A Bob Dylan Story by Martin Scorsese fourteen years later.

== Personal life ==
Neuwirth dated socialite Edie Sedgwick from 1966 to 1967. Reflecting on their relationship, he later said they drifted apart as she descended into drug addiction, explaining: "I couldn't believe that a person of such intelligence would mistreat herself to that extent," attributing her behavior to "desperation and a lack of outlet for that incredible energy."

Neuwirth was in a domestic partnership with Paula Batson until his death. He lived in Santa Monica, California, during his later years. He carried on painting throughout this time at a studio in the Meatpacking District in New York, and identified Jackson Pollock as his main inspiration that guided Neuwirth's colourful and abstract style. His artwork was displayed at Track 16 Gallery in a 2011 exhibition titled "Overs & Unders: Paintings by Bob Neuwirth, 1964–2009".

Known for being supportive and defensive of artists he believed in, Neuwirth was also known for being a provocateur and fan of instigation during the 60s and 70s.

He got sober in the later 1970s and this was a subject matter discussed by Neuwirth's his longtime partner, music executive Paula Batson in a Rolling Stone article.

Neuwirth died on the evening of May 18, 2022, in Santa Monica. He was 82, and had heart failure before his death.

== Discography ==
=== Solo ===
- 1974: Bob Neuwirth (Asylum)
- 1988: Back to the Front (Gold Castle)
- 1990: 99 Monkeys (Gold Castle)
- 1996: Look Up (Watermelon)
- 1999: Havana Midnight (Dreamsville Records)

=== With John Cale ===
- 1994: Last Day on Earth (MCA)

=== Other contributions ===
- The Band of Blacky Ranchette – Still Lookin' Good to Me (Thrill Jockey, 2003)
- Por Vida: A Tribute to the Songs of Alejandro Escovedo – "Rosalie" (Independent release, 2004)
- Rogue's Gallery: Pirate Ballads, Sea Songs, and Chanteys – Various Artists, 2006
- The Kropotkins – Portents of Love, producer, 2015
- Vince Bell – Ojo, producer, 2018

== Bibliography ==
- Baby, Let Me Follow You Down: The Illustrated Story of the Cambridge Folk Years, by Eric von Schmidt and Jim Rooney ISBN 0-385-14456-3
