= T Bone Burnett =

American guitarist and producer (born 1948)

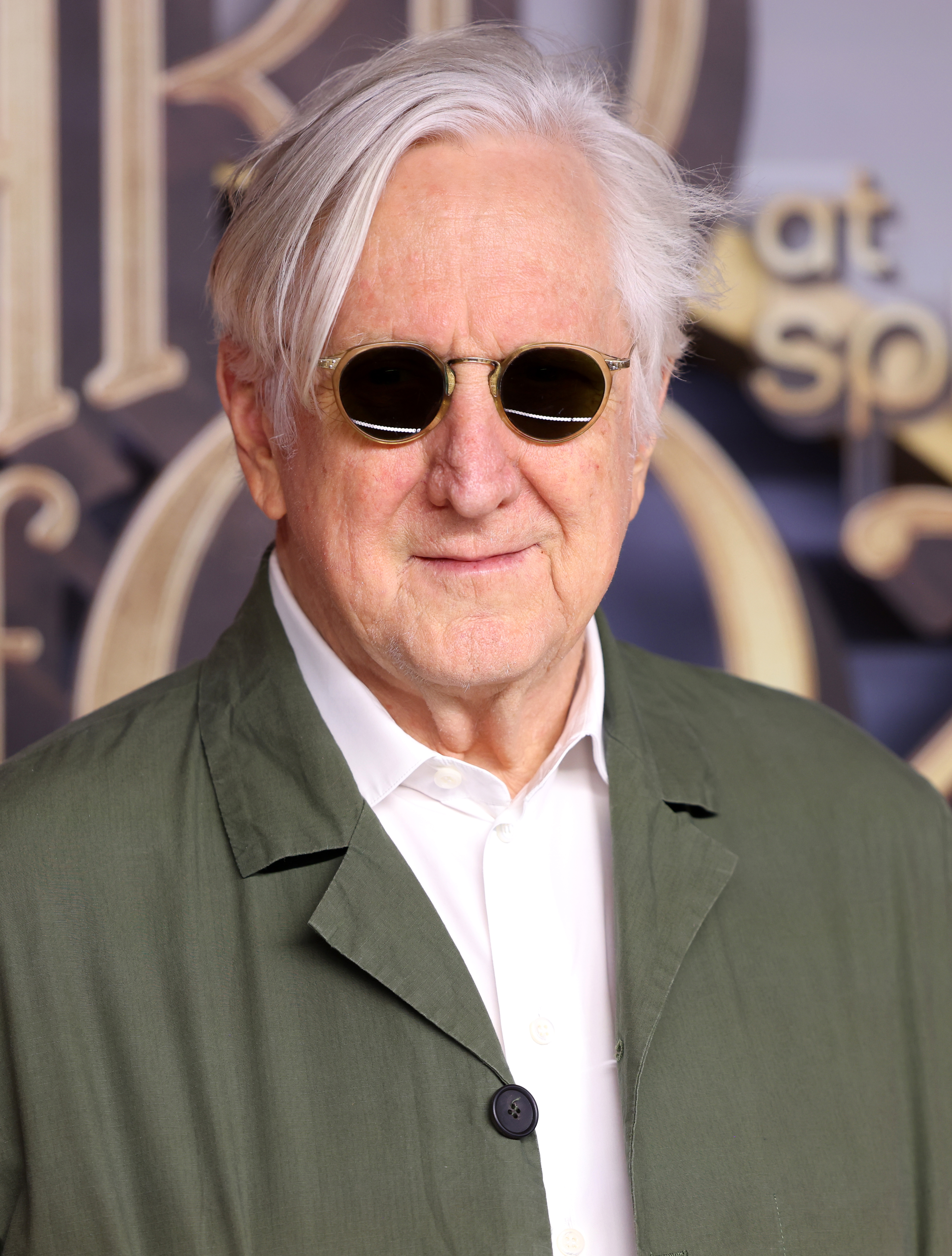
- Burnett in 2025

Background information
- Born: Joseph Henry Burnett III; January 14, 1948 (age 78); St. Louis, Missouri, U.S.
- Origin: Fort Worth, Texas, U.S.
- Genres: Americana; roots rock; country
- Occupations: Record producer; guitarist; songwriter; record executive
- Instruments: Guitar; vocals; bass guitar
- Years active: 1972–present
- Labels: Universal; Arista; Takoma; Warner Bros.; Demon; Columbia; DMZ
- Spouses: Sam Phillips (m. 1989; div. 2004) Callie Khouri (m. 2006)
- Website: tboneburnett.com

Joseph Henry "T Bone" Burnett III (born January 14, 1948) is an American record producer, guitarist, singer, and songwriter. He was a guitarist in Bob Dylan's band during the 1970s. Burnett has won several Grammy Awards for his work on film soundtracks, including O Brother, Where Art Thou? (2000), Cold Mountain (2004), Walk the Line (2005), and Crazy Heart (2010). He won another Grammy for producing the album Raising Sand (2007), in which he merged the contemporary bluegrass of Alison Krauss with the blues rock sound of Led Zeppelin's lead vocalist Robert Plant.

As a producer, Burnett has worked on formative or breakthrough albums by artists including Los Lobos, Counting Crows, Sam Phillips, and Gillian Welch, and later produced albums by Gregg Allman, Robert Plant and Alison Krauss, John Mellencamp, Elton John, Sara Bareilles, and Ringo Starr. He produced music for television programs including Nashville and True Detective. He has released several solo studio albums as a producer, including Tooth of Crime (2008), which he wrote for a revival of the 1972 musical play The Tooth of Crime (by Sam Shepard).

== Early life ==
The only child of Joseph Henry Burnett Jr. and Hazel Perkins Burnett, Burnett was born in St. Louis, Missouri, in 1948, and raised in Fort Worth, Texas. His grandfather worked as secretary for the Southern Baptist Convention. His father wanted to be a pro athlete and was courted by the Brooklyn Dodgers, but instead, he got a job in Fort Worth with the Tandy Corporation. Burnett was brought up in the Episcopal Church of his mother.

Burnett learned golf at an early age. When he was seven years old, he played at the Texas Christian University course. He idolized golf pro Ben Hogan, who was from Fort Worth. Burnett and the other boys occasionally watched him practice at the driving range. Burnett was on the golf team at Paschal High School. In 2014 he participated in the professional tournament at Pebble Beach.

== Burnett's musical roots ==
Burnett discovered music through his parents' 78 RPM phonograph records of Louis Armstrong, Count Basie, Duke Ellington, Ella Fitzgerald, Mahalia Jackson, Dinah Washington, and the songs of Cole Porter. He was drawn to music that took him to unconventional places, and he felt no compulsion to stick to one genre. He heard Peggy Lee, Hank Williams, and the Beatles on the radio, was influenced by Buddy Holly, and revered Johnny Cash. He was smitten by the music of Howlin' Wolf, Skip James, the Stanley Brothers, and Jimmy Reed.

He also learned about music through his friend, Stephen Bruton. Bruton's father was a jazz drummer who owned a music store on the Texas Christian University campus, where the boys spent many weekends. Bruton, a banjoist, revealed his interest in bluegrass music and field recordings from the 1920s and 1930s. Burnett was enamored with the live version of the song "Wrought Iron Rag" by the Dixieland revival band Wilbur de Paris and His New New Orleans Jazz. The boys would sneak into clubs to hear bands.

At around the same age, Burnett picked up the guitar. Overwhelmed by seeing the Beatles on The Ed Sullivan Show, he started garage bands with Bruton. After graduating from high school in 1965, they spent most of their time at Sound City, a recording studio in the basement of a radio station where Burnett became fascinated by recording. Forming the band The Loose Ends and adopting the stage name Jon T. Bone, Burnett wrote and recorded a 1966 single "Free Soul"/"He's A Nobody". The b-side briefly charted on local Fort Worth radio station KFJZ, and the single was picked up for national distribution by Mala Records, though it made no national chart listings. A second Loose Ends single ("Dead End Kid"/"Verses") appeared on Bell Records in 1967, but didn't chart regionally or nationally. This 1967 single was written and co-produced by Burnett (still using the alias "Jon T. Bone"), and was his first production credit. Still working as "Jon T. Bone", Burnett also produced or co-produced a handful of fairly obscure singles for other local acts in 1967/68.

Burnett's parents had divorced when he was in high school, and his father, with whom he was living, died in 1967. He attended Texas Christian University briefly, then dropped out to work as an artists and repertoire (A&R) agent.

== Pursuing music ==
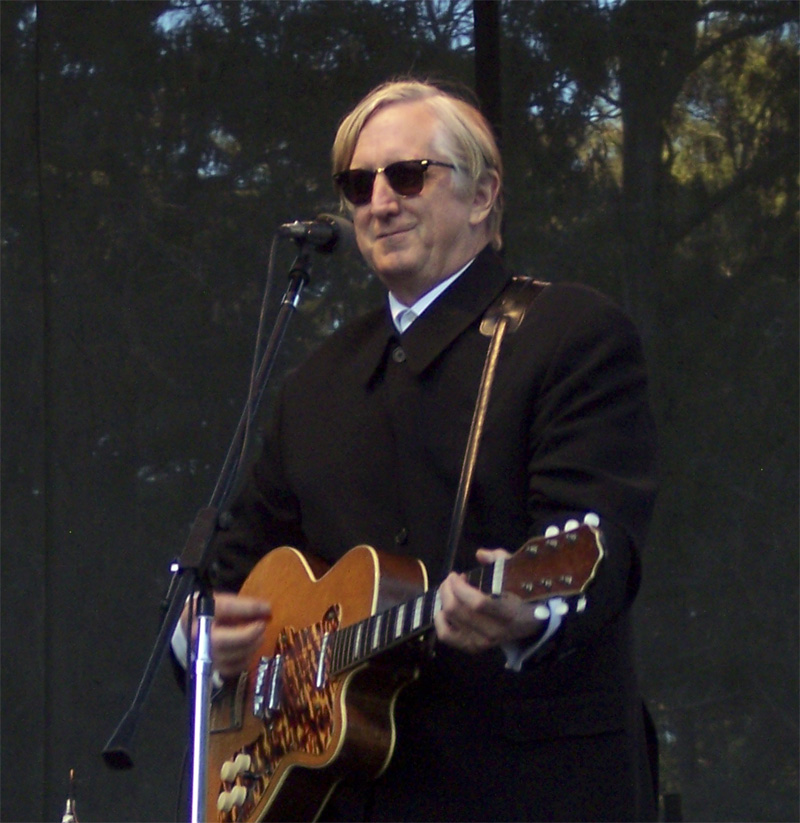
Burnett in 2007

Burnett (as J. Henry Burnett) produced and played drums on "Paralyzed", the novelty hit by the Legendary Stardust Cowboy. He also worked as producer on other work by LSC as "Jay Burnett", and on an early single by John Nitzinger as "J. Burnett". As "Joseph Burnett", he then produced the only album by the pseudonymous group Whistler, Chaucer, Detroit, and Greenhill (The Unwritten Works of Geoffrey, Etc.). Though he was not a group member, Burnett contributed four songs to the album as a writer, and also appeared as a musician. (Uni, 1968). Fairly consistently billed as J. Henry Burnett from mid-1968, he also continued to work as a producer for other local acts such as Crowd + 1 and The Third Avenue Blues Band.

Burnett moved to Los Angeles where he recorded and released (again as J. Henry Burnett) The B-52 Band & the Fabulous Skylarks (Uni, 1972), which had minimal commercial impact. He continued producing the work of other artists, notably Delbert McClinton. In 1975 and 1976, he toured with Bob Dylan's Rolling Thunder Revue. By then, he was billed as T-Bone Burnett: the hyphen in T-Bone would be used though the 1970s into the mid-1980s, until Burnett decided on the spelling "T Bone".

When the Revue ended, Burnett and two other members of Dylan's band, David Mansfield and Steven Soles, formed The Alpha Band, which released three albums: The Alpha Band (1976), Spark in the Dark (1977), and The Statue Makers of Hollywood (1978).

Burnett and singer-songwriter Sam Phillips were married in 1989 and divorced in 2004. He produced many of her albums, including Martinis & Bikinis and Cruel Inventions.

== Solo work ==
Burnett released several solo albums, although he did not score any major Hot 100 hits. In 1980, Burnett released his first post-Alpha Band solo album, Truth Decay, produced by Reggie Fisher, on the Takoma Records label. Truth Decay was a roots rock album described by the Rolling Stone Record Guide as "mystic Christian blues". In 1982, his Trap Door EP (also produced by Reggie Fisher), released on Warner Bros. Records, yielded the song "I Wish You Could Have Seen Her Dance". Burnett toured after the release of Trap Door, opening several dates for The Who, leading a band that featured Mick Ronson on guitar. His 1983 album Proof Through the Night, whose song "When the Night Falls" got some FM airplay, and his 1987 album The Talking Animals were more in the vein of 1980s new wave music, while his self-titled 1986 album was an album of acoustic country music. His 1992 album The Criminal Under My Own Hat tended toward adult album alternative music.

Proof Through the Night was reissued by Rhino Records' Handmade Music in a limited edition of 5,000 on May 29, 2007, in an expanded version. The double CD also included the EPs Trap Door and Behind the Trap Door. In 2006, he released two albums. The True False Identity was his first album of new songs since 1992, and Twenty Twenty – The Essential T Bone Burnett was a 40-song career retrospective.

In 2019, he released The Invisible Light: Acoustic Space with Jay Bellerose and Keefus Ciancia, which was followed in 2022 by The Invisible Light: Spells again with Bellerose and Ciancia, and in 2024 by The Other Side, featuring Lucius, Steven Soles, and Rosanne Cash.

== Production and other professional activities ==
=== Producing ===
Burnett's production credits include How Will the Wolf Survive? (Slash/Warner Bros., 1984) by Los Lobos, King of America (Columbia, 1986) by Elvis Costello, Martinis & Bikinis (Virgin, 1994) and Fan Dance (Nonesuch, 2001) by Sam Phillips, Raising Sand (Rounder, 2007) by Robert Plant and Alison Krauss, Life, Death, Love and Freedom (Hear Music, 2008) by John Mellencamp, The Diving Board (Capitol, 2013) by Elton John, and the soundtracks The Big Lebowski, O Brother, Where Art Thou?, Cold Mountain, and Crazy Heart.

In 1985, Burnett collaborated with Elvis Costello on the single "The People's Limousine", using the moniker "The Coward Brothers". (Burnett was identified in the credits as "Henry Coward"; the Coward Brothers personas would be very occasionally revived over the following decades, culminating in a full-length Coward Brothers studio album in 2024.) In 1987, he produced Roy Orbison's two-record album, In Dreams: The Greatest Hits and two songs of Mystery Girl. Also in 1997, he wrote songs for the Sam Shepard play The Tooth of Crime: Second Dance, which premiered off-Broadway in New York City with Vincent D'Onofrio and Kirk Acevedo. An album of these songs, Tooth of Crime, was released in May 2008, featuring guitarist Marc Ribot, Sam Phillips and David Poe, whose self-titled debut Burnett also produced that year. According to Burnett, he was inspired by the music of Skip James while composing songs for the updated version of Shepard's play.

In April 2006, he announced that his first concert tour in nearly two decades would begin on May 16 in Chicago at The Vic Theatre. Around the same time, jazz singer Cassandra Wilson released an album of blues songs, Thunderbird (2006), which was produced by Burnett. He wrote one of the album's songs and co-wrote another with Ethan Coen. He produced music for the remake of the film All the King's Men.

In 2006, he produced Brandi Carlile's The Story album, the title song of which became a minor hit and was featured on a special broadcast of ABC-TV's Grey's Anatomy. Carlile's guitarist and bassist, twins Tim and Phil Hanseroth, respectively, used instruments from Burnett's private collection during the "live" recordings in Vancouver, British Columbia.

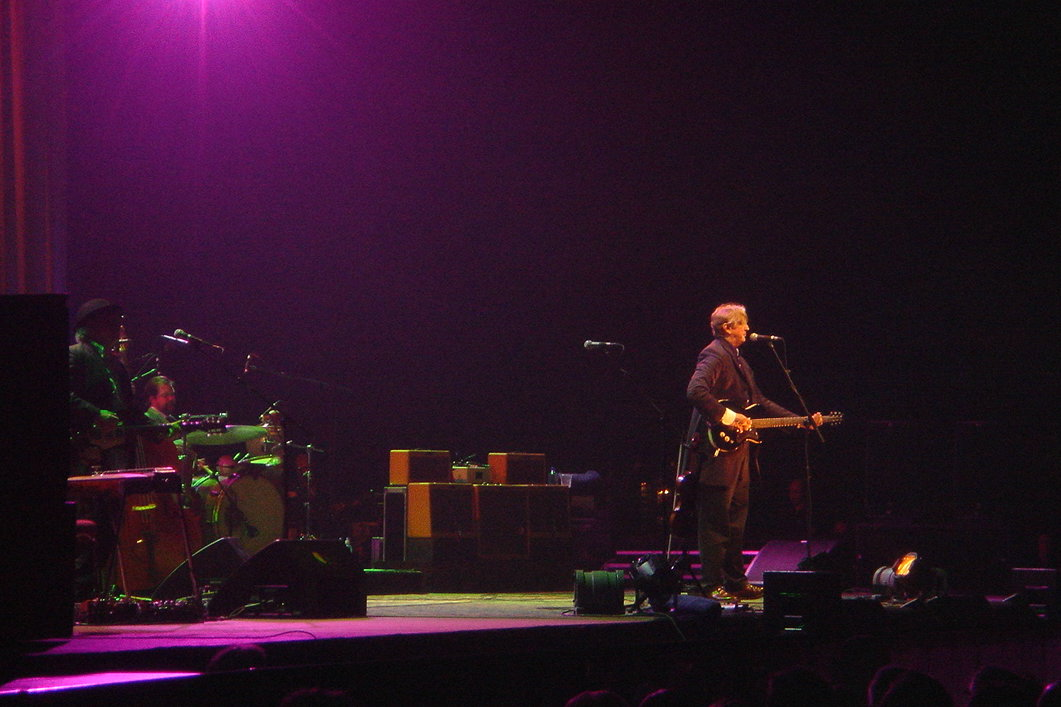
T Bone Burnett on stage at Birmingham's NIA, May 5, 2008, with Alison Krauss and Robert Plant

In early 2008, Pete Townshend announced that Burnett was to go into the studio that fall to help produce an all-covers album for The Who. However, on a May 15, 2008, episode of the NPR radio show All Songs Considered, Burnett threw that project into question. He stated that Townshend had indicated in a blog that he was putting all his projects on hold.

In 2009, Burnett produced albums for Moonalice and Grace Potter and the Nocturnals. In that same year, he also produced Elvis Costello's album Secret, Profane & Sugarcane as well as co-writing the song "Sulfur to Sugarcane" with Costello.

Burnett produced a collaboration album by Elton John and Leon Russell. John, Russell, and Bernie Taupin (John's lyricist) wrote songs together in late 2009. The album, The Union, was recorded in January 2010 and released in October 2010.

In 2010, Burnett produced Gregg Allman's album Low Country Blues, released in January 2011.

From 2010 to 2012 Burnett produced Lisa Marie Presley's album Storm & Grace, released May 15, 2012.

In 2014, Burnett produced Punch Brothers' fourth studio album, The Phosphorescent Blues, which was released in January 2015.

In 2016, he produced the Italian bluesman Zucchero Fornaciari's album Black Cat.

In 2016, T Bone produced Jupiter Calling by the Corrs; a record that received mixed reviews, but encapsulated the core of their sound and songwriting ability.

In July 2018, he produced Sara Bareilles' Amidst the Chaos in Los Angeles.

Burnett played electric guitar on and produced six mid-2021 Bob Dylan recordings of "Blowin' in the Wind," "Masters of War," "The Times They Are A-Changin' (song)," "Simple Twist of Fate," "Gotta Serve Somebody," and "Not Dark Yet" intended to be auctioned or sold as unique Ionic Original recordings. A newly recorded version of "Blowin' in the Wind" was auctioned by Christie's in 2022 for almost $1.8 million. "Masters of War," "Simple Twist of Fate," and "Gotta Serve Somebody" were to be sold by Christie's through private sale in late 2023.

Burnett also produced and co-wrote Ringo Starr's January 2025 country music album Look Up.

=== Code ===
In 2008, it was reported that Burnett "started a new venture called Code, which aims to do for music what THX did for movie-theater sound: set standards that ensure the best possible quality." He is opposed to the trend of brighter and more compressed processing to such an extent that he largely retired from the music business around 1995–1996 and pursued an opportunity to work in theater with Sam Shepard, which led to his work on several films.

The audio format known as Code involves the simultaneous release of multiple sound formats, thus avoiding much of the processing which happens when sound is converted from one format to another. The first album produced with Code was Life, Death, Love and Freedom (2008) by John Mellencamp.

== Work in films ==
In 1992, Burnett worked on some songs with his friend River Phoenix for the movie The Thing Called Love. He was the coach of Samantha Mathis.

In 2000, Burnett produced the soundtrack and wrote the score for the Coen Brothers film O Brother, Where Art Thou?. The award-winning soundtrack featured music from Emmylou Harris, Alison Krauss, Ralph Stanley, Gillian Welch, and others performing traditional American folk music, blues and bluegrass—reminiscent of Burnett's 1986 self-titled release. The album was a hit, garnering numerous industry awards from the Grammys, the Academy of Country Music, and the Country Music Association. The album was a commercial success and sold almost eight million copies, according to Billboard.

A documentary film, Down from the Mountain, was made of a benefit concert of the soundtrack performed by the artists on the album; Burnett figures prominently in the film. For producing the soundtrack albums for these two films, and for his wife Sam Phillips's album Fan Dance, Burnett won the 2002 Grammy Award for Producer of the Year, Non-Classical. Burnett went on to produce the less popular gospel soundtrack to the Coens' The Ladykillers.

In 2004, under the name "Henry Burnett", he arranged "I Wish My Baby Was Born" and wrote "Like a Songbird That Has Fallen" and "The Scarlet Tide" for the movie Cold Mountain. "Scarlet Tide", co-written with Elvis Costello and performed by Alison Krauss, was nominated for an Academy Award for Best Song and won BAFTA's Anthony Asquith Award for Achievement in Film Music.

In 2005, he composed the score for Wim Wenders' film Don't Come Knocking.

In 2005, he worked with actors Joaquin Phoenix and Reese Witherspoon for their singing roles as Johnny Cash and June Carter Cash in the film Walk the Line. Witherspoon won the Academy Award for Best Actress for her role in the film, giving special thanks to Burnett in her speech for "helping her realize her lifelong dream of being a country music singer". He also produced that film's soundtrack album and wrote its score.

In 2009, Burnett collaborated on music for the movie Crazy Heart, winning a Golden Globe, an Academy Award, and a Grammy Award for the song "The Weary Kind", which he composed with Ryan Bingham. Burnett was also a producer of the film, along with Jeff Bridges and Robert Duvall.

In 2012, he was the executive music producer for The Hunger Games soundtrack, and wrote the track "Safe and Sound" himself. In 2013, he was the executive music producer for the Coen brothers' film Inside Llewyn Davis.

== Personal life ==
Burnett and female singer-songwriter Sam Phillips were married in 1989 and divorced in 2004. He married Callie Khouri, the Oscar-winning screenwriter of Thelma & Louise and the creator of the television show Nashville in 2006. He has two daughters.

== Real estate development ==
With Bert Mathews, Burnett is the co-founder of Cloud Hill Partnership, a company that planned to redevelop Herschel Greer Stadium in Nashville, Tennessee. The proposed redevelopment of the 21-acre (8.5 ha) site included music and art space, a community center, open park space and affordable housing. The Cloud Hill proposal was abandoned in January 2018 after archaeologists determined that undisturbed areas on the edge of the Greer property, but not part of the stadium itself, were the unmarked burial sites of slaves forced to build the adjacent Fort Negley.

== Awards and honors ==
=== Grammy Awards ===
- Producer of the Year, Non-Classical (2001, 2004)
- Record of the Year: "Please Read the Letter" (2008)
- Album of the Year: O Brother, Where Art Thou? (2001), Raising Sand (2008)
- Best Compilation Soundtrack Album for a Motion Picture, Television or Other Visual Media: O Brother, Where Art Thou? (2001), Cold Mountain (2004), Walk the Line (2006), Crazy Heart (2010)
- Best Contemporary Folk/Americana Album: Raising Sand (2008)
- Best Traditional Folk Album: Down from the Mountain (2001)
- Best Traditional Pop Vocal Album: A Wonderful World (2004)
- Best Traditional Blues Album: One Kind Favor (2008)
- Best Song Written for a Motion Picture, Television or Other Visual Media: "The Scarlet Tide" (2004), "The Weary Kind" (2010)
- Best Song Written for Visual Media: "Safe & Sound" (2012)

=== Other awards ===
In 2010, Burnett won several awards for the movie Crazy Heart. He and Ryan Bingham shared the Academy Award for Best Original Song and the Golden Globe Award for Best Song for "The Weary Kind". The song won them a Critics' Choice Award and won Burnett a Satellite Award from the International Press Academy. For the score, Burnett and Stephen Bruton won an award from Los Angeles Film Critics Association and Burnett won the Frederick Loewe award. He shared the award for Best First Feature at the Independent Spirit Awards with the producers (Robert Duvall, Rob Carliner and Judy Cairo) and director Scott Cooper. He was awarded an honorary doctorate in performing arts from the University of North Carolina at Chapel Hill in May 2019.

== Solo discography ==
Album	Release date
The B-52 Band & the Fabulous Skylarks	1972
Truth Decay	1980
Trap Door	1982
Proof Through the Night	1983
Behind the Trap Door	1984
T-Bone Burnett	1986
The Talking Animals	1987
The Criminal Under My Own Hat	1992
The True False Identity	2006
Tooth of Crime	2008
T-Bone Burnett Presents The Speaking Clock Revue: Live from the Beacon Theatre	2011
A Place at the Table	2013
The Invisible Light: Acoustic Space with Jay Bellerose and Keefus Ciancia	2019
The Invisible Light: Spells with Jay Bellerose and Keefus Ciancia	2022
The Other Side	2024

=== Compilations ===
Album	Song	Release date
Where the Pyramid Meets the Eye: A Tribute to Roky Erickson	Nothing in Return	1990
Until the End of the World	Humans from Earth	1991
Twenty Twenty – The Essential T Bone Burnett		2006

== Alpha Band discography ==
Album	Release date
The Statue Makers of Hollywood	1978
Spark in the Dark	1977
Alpha Band	1976

== Film and television discography ==
Project	Medium	Credit	Release date
Music from The American Epic Sessions	Television	Producer	2017
True Detective	Television	Producer	2014
Another Day, Another Time: Celebrating the Music of Inside Llewyn Davis	Television	Producer	2013
Inside Llewyn Davis	Film	Executive Music Producer	2013
Nashville	Television	Executive Music Producer	2012–2013
The Hunger Games film score	Film	Executive Music Producer	March 26, 2012
Tough Trade	Television	Executive producer, Music Producer, composer	2010
Crazy Heart	Film	Producer, songwriter, composer	December 19, 2009
Across The Universe	Film	Music Producer	December 10, 2007
All the King's Men	Film	Executive Music Producer	September 22, 2006
Walk the Line	Film	Executive Music Producer, composer	November 18, 2005
Don't Come Knocking	Film	Executive Music Producer, composer	August 25, 2005
The Ladykillers	Film	Executive Music Producer	March 26, 2004
Cold Mountain	Film	Executive Music Producer	December 25, 2003
The Divine Secrets of the Ya-Ya Sisterhood	Film	Composer	July 6, 2002
O Brother, Where Art Thou?	Film	Music Producer, Original Music	December 22, 2000
The Big Lebowski	Film	Musical Archivist	June 3, 1998
Great Balls of Fire!	Film	Music producer, composer	June 29, 1989
Roy Orbison and Friends: A Black and White Night	TV special	Musical Director	March 1, 1988
Heaven's Gate	Film	Heaven's Gate Band (as T-Bone Burnett)	November 18, 1980
