= Sam Llanas =

American singer-songwriter

- Born: Samuel J. Llanas; February 6, 1961 (age 65); United States
- Occupations: Songwriter, singer, guitarist
- Instrument: Guitar

Samuel J. Llanas (born February 6, 1961) is an American singer, acoustic guitarist, and songwriter in several rock and roots rock bands active from the 1980s to the 2000s, including BoDeans and Absinthe.

== Career ==
Llanas was one of the founding members of the roots rock band BoDeans, which he formed with high school friend Kurt Neumann in Waukesha, Wisconsin. In 1985, after adding Guy Hoffman (drums) in 1984 and Bob Griffin (bass), the quartet signed a contract with Slash/Warner Records and shortened their name from Da BoDeans to the BoDeans.

Under the guidance of producer T Bone Burnett, Bodeans entered Hollywood's Sunset Sound Factory in October to record their first album. The critically acclaimed debut Love & Hope & Sex & Dreams was released in 1986. In the late 1980s and early 1990s, the band had several singles in the top 40 "mainstream rock" charts. In the mid-1990s, the band had two top 10 songs in the "Adult contemporary" charts.

Llanas provided backing vocals on three tracks from Robbie Robertson's self-titled 1987 solo album. He and Neumann, credited as BoDeans, performed on "Showdown at Big Sky" and "American Roulette". Llanas is credited individually on "Somewhere Down the Crazy River".

BoDeans took some time off in the late 1990s so Neumann and Llanas could record solo albums. Llanas founded Absinthe, with the help of Milwaukee musicians Jim Eannelli (guitars and bass) and Guy Hoffman (formerly of Oil Tasters and Violent Femmes, currently of Radio Romeo). They have released one album, 1998's A Good Day to Die.

In 2011, Llanas announced that he would release his second solo album, titled 4 A.M., on October 25. On August 18, he left BoDeans for unknown reasons.

== Personal life ==
In June 2018, Neumann's stepdaughter told interviewers that Llanas had subjected her to repeated acts of sexual abuse from 2001 though 2007 while she was a minor. Llanas has denied the allegations. As of March 7, 2019, no police report or criminal charges had been filed.

== Discography ==
- A Good Day to Die (1998) (Absinthe/Sam Llanas solo project) – Llanas Music
- 4 A.M. (The Way Home) (2011) Inner Knot Records
- Four / Five Live – Volume I (2013) Llanas Music
- The Whole Night Thru (2014) Daystorm/Sam Llanas Music
- Return of the Goya – Part 1 (Llanas Music 2018, CD)
