= Kurt Neumann (musician) =

American singer-songwriter

- Kurt Neumann (right) in 1988

Background information
- Born: Kurt Robert Neumann; October 9, 1961 (age 64); Milwaukee, Wisconsin, U.S.
- Genres: Roots rock, heartland rock, alternative rock
- Occupations: Singer, guitarist, songwriter

Kurt Robert Neumann (born October 9, 1961) is an American singer, guitarist, and songwriter. He is a co-founder of the roots-rock band BoDeans.

== History ==
Neumann co-founded BoDeans in Wisconsin in the 1980s. The band's style encompasses multiple rock genres, including roots rock, heartland rock, and alternative rock. In January 1987, a Rolling Stone reader poll voted BoDeans the Best New American Band. The band's biggest hit to date is "Closer to Free", which was used as the theme song to the hit TV series Party of Five. BoDeans has a permanent installation at the Rock and Roll Hall of Fame Museum in Cleveland, Ohio.

In 1997, Neumann recorded a cover of Bruce Springsteen's "Atlantic City" for the compilation One Step Up/Two Steps Back: The Songs of Bruce Springsteen.

In 2000, Neumann released a solo album entitled Shy Dog. He played all the instruments on the album.

Neumann builds and plays custom "Bastard" guitars, which are made from unique parts from other guitars and feature hand-painted tung oil finishes. The guitars are mostly built in the form of Stratocasters, but have rear-routed bodies.

== Discography ==
- Shy Dog (2000)
