= Alison Sudol discography =

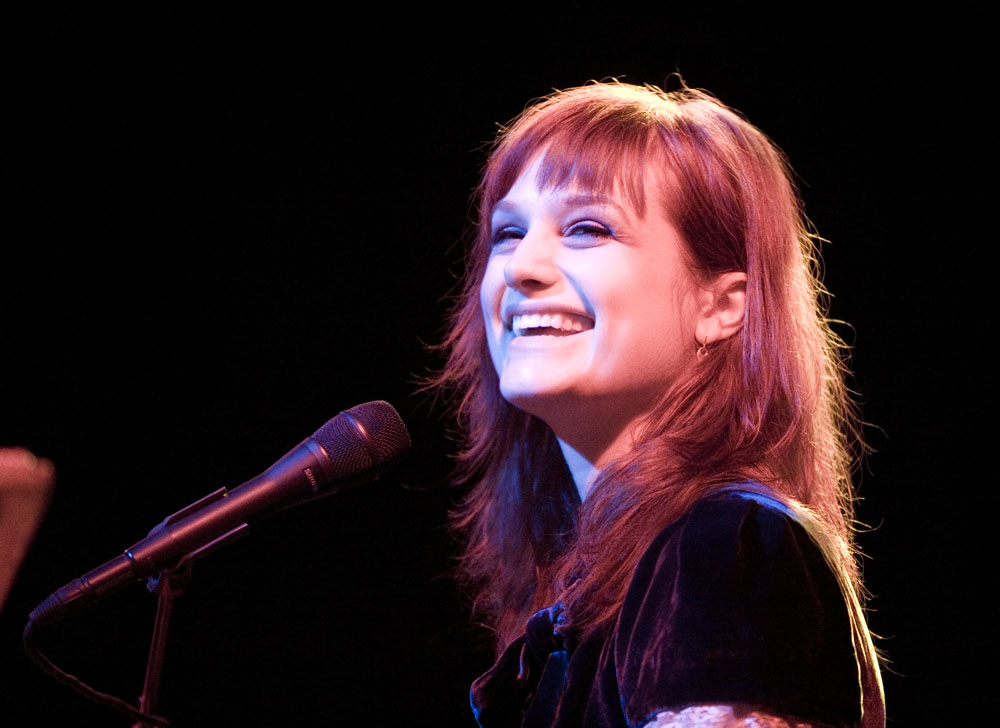
- Alison Sudol performing live in Salt Lake City Utah, in 2008.
- Studio albums: 4
- EPs: 7
- Live albums: 1
- Singles: 9
- Music videos: 8

American recording artist Alison Sudol, as moniker A Fine Frenzy, has released three studio albums, five extended plays (EPs), one live album and fifteen singles. The first single, "Almost Lover", peaked at number 25 on Billboard's Hot Adult Contemporary Tracks chart. In mid-2007, she secured another opening spot, this time for Rufus Wainwright on his tour. The debut album, One Cell in the Sea was released on July 17, 2007. Sudol's second album, Bomb in a Birdcage, was released September 8, 2009. The first single, "Blow Away," was released on July 17, 2009, followed by two more singles, "Happier" and "Electric Twist."

On November 23, 2009, a live album and concert film recorded in 2007, A Fine Frenzy Live at the House of Blues Chicago, was released on iTunes. The third album, Pines, was released on October 9, 2012. In June 2015 Sudol stated that she will no longer perform as A Fine Frenzy. "A few years ago I put A Fine Frenzy to bed.” Although choosing acting she continues to write songs.

== Albums ==
=== Studio albums ===
List of albums, with selected chart positions and certifications
Title	Album details	Peak chart positions							Certifications	Sales
Title	Album details	US	US Alt.	US Rock	AUT	CAN	GER	SWI	Certifications	Sales
One Cell in the Sea	Released: July 17, 2007; Label: Virgin; Format: CD, digital download	91	20	—	6	—	20	11	BVMI: Gold; IFPI AUT: Gold	US: 300,000
Bomb in a Birdcage	Released: August 28, 2009; Label: Virgin; Format: CD, digital download	28	—	10	35	80	33	15		
Pines	Released: October 9, 2012; Label: Virgin; Format: CD, digital download	62	—	28	—	—	—	49		
Still Come the Night	Released: September 30, 2022; Label: Format: CD, digital Download	—	—	—	—	—	—	—		
"—" denotes releases that did not chart or were not released in that territory.

=== Live albums ===
List of live albums
Title	Album details
A Fine Frenzy Live at the House of Blues Chicago	Released: November 23, 2009; Label: Virgin; Format: CD, digital download

== Extended plays ==
List of extended plays, with selected chart positions
Title	Details	Peak chart positions	
Title	Details	US	US Rock
Demo	Released: December 12, 2006; Label: Virgin; Format: CD, digital download	—	—
Live in 2007	Released: July 15, 2007; Label: Virgin; Format: CD, digital download	—	—
Live Session	Released: November 20, 2007; Label: Virgin; Format: CD, digital download	—	—
Come On, Come Out	Released: August 12, 2008; Label: Virgin; Format: CD, digital download	—	—
Oh Blue Christmas	Released: November 3, 2009; Label: Virgin; Format: CD, digital download	87	28
Moon	Released: November 2, 2018; Label: We Are Hearth	—	—
Moonlite	Released: August 2, 2019; Label: We Are Hearth	—	—
"—" denotes releases that did not chart or were not released in that territory.

== Singles ==
List of singles, with selected chart positions and certifications
Title	Year	Peak chart positions							Certifications	Album
Title	Year	US	US A/C	US Adult	AUT	CZE	GER	SWI	Certifications	Album
"Rangers"	2006	—	—	—	—	—	—	—		Demo
"Lifesize"	2007	—	—	—	—	—	—	—		One Cell in the Sea
"Almost Lover"	2007	— (Note: "Almost Lover" did not enter the Billboard Hot 100, but peaked at number 9 on the Bubbling Under Hot 100 Singles chart.)	23	—	5	35	8	10	BVMI: Gold; IFPI SWI: Gold	One Cell in the Sea
"Come On, Come Out"	2008	—	—	—	—	—	—	—		One Cell in the Sea
"The Things We Did Last Summer"	2009	—	—	—	—	—	—	—		His Way, Our Way
"Blow Away"	2009	—	—	38	—	—	—	—		Bomb in a Birdcage
"Happier"	2010	—	—	—	—	—	—	—		Bomb in a Birdcage
"Electric Twist"	2010	—	—	—	—	—	—	—		Bomb in a Birdcage
"Now is the Start"	2012	—	—	—	—	—	—	—		Pines
"—" denotes releases that did not chart or were not released in that territory.

=== Promotional singles ===
List of singles
Title	Year	Album
"Near to You"	2007	One Cell in the Sea
"Hope for the Hopeless"	2007	One Cell in the Sea

== Other appearances ==
Title	Year	Other artist(s)	Album
"Fever"	2007	—N/a	'Dan in Real Life
"Let it Snow"	2007	—N/a	Stockings by the Fire
"Last of Days"	2007	—N/a	Tough Love & Broken Hearts
"You Picked Me"	2008	—N/a	'Now That's What I Call Music! 19
"Ride Goldrush"	2009	—N/a	Powder Blue
"New Heights"	2010	—N/a	Now Hear This! 85
"All You Wanted"	2010	Sounds Under Radio	The Vampire Diaries
"Times Moves Slow"	2010	Aqualung	Magnetic North
"What I Wouldn't Do"	2012	—N/a	The Lucky One

== Music videos ==
List of music videos, showing year released and director
Title	Year	Director
"Rangers"	2006	Caitlin Dahl
"Almost Lover"	2007	Laurent Briet
"Almost Lover" (version 2)	2007	Brothers Nee
"Come On, Come Out"	2008	unknown
"Blow Away"	2009	Jim Hosking
"Lost Things"	2009	Angela Kolher & Ithyle Griffiths
"Happier"	2010	Brothers Nee
"Electric Twist"	2010	Justin Purser
"Now is the Start"	2012	Julian Acosta
"It's Really Raining"	2019	Marlene Marino
