= Keefus Ciancia =

American musician

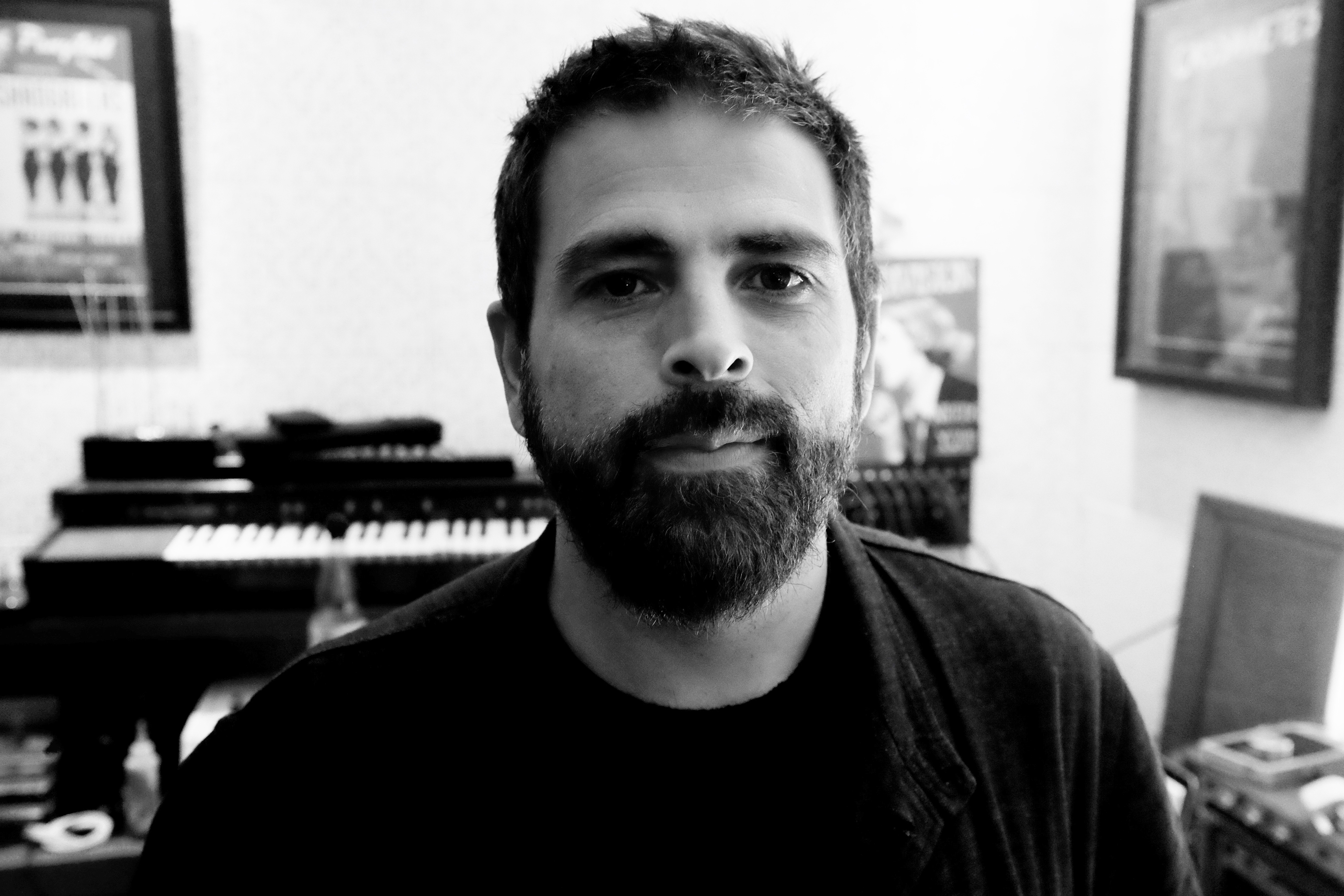

Background information
- Also known as: Keefus Ciancia; Keefus Green
- Born: Denver, Colorado, U.S.
- Genres: Rock; pop; hip hop; ambient; experimental
- Occupations: Musician; producer; composer
- Instruments: Keyboards, synthesizers, bass, drums
- Years active: 1991–present
- Website: keefusciancia.com

Keefus Ciancia is an American film and television composer, music producer, and musician. He has won an Ivor Novello Award, BAFTA, and a BMI Film & TV Award. He has composed and produced music for True Detective, Killing Eve, London Spy, The Fall, and Spider-Man 2.

He has produced albums for such artists as Benji Hughes, Kimbra, Everlast, A Fine Frenzy, and Étienne Daho. As a keyboardist and pianist he has performed with Elton John, Mike Patton, Iggy Pop, T Bone Burnett, and Everlast. Ciancia has worked extensively with T Bone Burnett as a film and TV composer, co-producer, and as a band member of The Invisible Light. He is currently a member of the musical groups Unloved, Vincent & Mr. Green, and The Invisible Light.

== Early life and career ==
Ciancia was born in Denver, Colorado. He played classical piano as child, and as a teenager played in various bands including his high school band. His band teacher sent a musical piece that Ciancia composed to various colleges and he was awarded scholarships to University of North Texas and USC. After moving to Los Angeles in the early 1990s Ciancia began working as a hip-hop session musician, recording with Ice Cube, Dr. Dre, South Central Cartel, and E-40. During that same period, he began working with Lonnie Marshall and they formed the band Weapon of Choice.

== Career ==
Ciancia is a multi-instrumentalist, film and television composer, music producer, and recording artist. He has composed music for the TV series True Detective, which earned him an Emmy nomination. He also won a BAFTA Award for composing music for the TV series Killing Eve, and an Ivor Novello Award for his music in London Spy. Ciancia produced the Emmy award-winning theme song for the TV series Saving Grace, titled "Saving Grace", by Everlast.

He has worked on numerous recording projects with T Bone Burnett dating back to 1997, when Burnett heard Ciancia's music on a local radio station (KRCW) in Los Angeles and began a working relationship with him as a session musician. Ciancia co-produced and co-composed music on The Ladykillers and the HBO series True Detective. He teamed up with Burnett as an artist on The Invisible Light: Spells and The Invisible Light: Acoustic Space.

He also co-produced and co-wrote Sleeping Tapes with Jeff Bridges.

Ciancia has performed live with Elton John, Mike Patton, Iggy Pop, T Bone Burnett, and Everlast. He has produced albums for such artists as Kimbra (Vows, The Golden Echo), Everlast, Nikka Costa (Pro Whoa), Cassandra Wilson (Thunderbird, Closer to You: The Pop Side), and Unloved.

Ciancia was a keyboardist and co-producer for Everlast (1998–2007) whom he toured with extensively and recorded on albums Whitey Ford Sings the Blues, Eat at Whitey's, and White Trash Beautiful. He later co-produced Love, War and the Ghost of Whitey Ford as well as producing Everlast's Emmy Award-winning theme song, "Saving Grace", for the TV series Saving Grace.

He has been a member of musical groups The Invisible Light, Unloved, Vincent & Mr. Green, The Jade Vincent Experiment, and Weapon of Choice.

== Musician and recording artist ==
- The Invisible Light

Ciancia teamed up with T Bone Burnett on the albums The Invisible Light: Spells and The Invisible Light: Acoustic Space.

- Unloved

Unloved was formed in 2013 in Los Angeles, and is composed of Jade Vincent, Keefus Green (Ciancia), and David Holmes. Holmes met Ciancia and Vincent during the time when the duo had started a regular Tuesday night residency at the Rotary Room in Los Feliz. The band has released four albums – 2016's Guilty of Love, 2019's Heartbreak, 2022's The Pink Album, and 2023's Polychrome and Killing Eve'r Ode To The Lovers (Killing Eve Unloved release soundtrack, seasons 1, 2, 3, & 4).

- Vincent & Mister Green / The Jade Vincent Experiment

Singer-songwriter Jade Vincent and Ciancia formed Vincent & Mr. Green as an offshoot of their first musical project, the Jade Vincent Experiment, an experimental, film-noir band who played the Los Angeles club scene in the mid- to late 1990s. They have been collaborating since 1993. Film credits for the duo include True Detective, Killing Eve, Baby Driver, and Divine Secrets of the Ya-Ya Sisterhood. They have released two albums as Vincent & Mr. Green, 2004's Vincent & Mr. Green and 2010's Smash Up. They have also released one album, 1998's Moy, as the Jade Vincent Experiment.

- Weapon of Choice

Keefus Ciancia was a founding member of Weapon of Choice in 1992. They played a mixture of experimental, rock, alternative, funk, hip hop, jazz, and reggae, which frontman Lonnie Marshall dubbed Nutmeg. The group shared the stage with the Red Hot Chili Peppers, Jane's Addiction, Fishbone, and the P-Funk All Stars, and were known for selling out venues in Seattle. Ciancia recorded four albums with the band, Nut-Meg Sez "Bozo the Town" (1994), Highperspice (1996), Nutmeg Phantasy (1998), and Color Me Funky (2004).

== Awards ==
Year	Nominated work	Category	Award	Result
2019	True Detective	Outstanding Music Composition for a Limited Series, Movie or Special	Emmy Award	Nominated
2019	Killing Eve	Original Music	BAFTA	Won
2016	London Spy	Best TV Soundtrack	Ivor Novello Award	Won
2013	The Fall	Original Score	RTS Craft & Design Award	Nominated
2010	Saving Grace	Music Scoring	BMI Film & TV Award	Won

== Selected discography ==
Year	Album	Artist	Credit
2023	Killing Eve'r Ode to the Lovers (vinyl release)	Unloved	Band member, producer, arranger, synthesizers, bass, programming
2023	Great Expectations Soundtrack	Keefus Ciancia	Producer, composer, arranger, keyboards, bass, drums, programming
2023	Polychrome	Unloved	Band member, producer, arranger, synthesizers, bass, programming
2022	The Pink Album	Unloved	Band member, producer, arranger, synthesizers, bass, programming
2022	The Invisible Light - Spells	T Bone Burnett	Keyboards
2022	Made for Love - Season 2 Soundtrack	Keefus Ciancia	Composer
2022	Alegoría	Gaby Moreno	Keyboards, synthesizer, engineer
2021	The Virus X Experience	Étienne Daho	Producer, arranger, keyboards, programming
2021	Made for Love - Season 1 Soundtrack	Keefus Ciancia	Composer
2019	The Invisible Light: Acoustic Space	T Bone Burnett, Keefus Ciancia, and Jay Bellerose	Keyboards
2019	Heartbreak	Unloved	Band member, producer, arranger, synthesizers, bass, programming
2017	Lust for Life	Lana Del Rey	Keyboards (interludes)
2017	Who Built the Moon?	Noel Gallagher's High Flying Birds	Keyboards
2016	Now	Shania Twain	Producer, keyboards
2016	Pure Comedy	Father John Misty	Keyboards, samples
2015	I Love You, Honeybear	Father John Misty	Performer
2015	Sleeping Tapes	Jeff Bridges	Co-producer, keyboards
2014	Blitz	Étienne Daho	Co-producer, composer
2014	True Romance	Charli XCX	Keyboards
2014	You Only Live Forever	John Gold	Producer, keyboards, programming
2014	This Is Where We Are	Priscilla Ahn	Composer
2014	The Golden Echo	Kimbra	Producer
2013	The Diving Board	Elton John	Keyboards
2013	More Light	Primal Scream	Piano, bells
2013	The Great Pretenders	Mini Mansions	Keyboards, sampling
2013	Your Turn	Marc Ribot's Cermanic Dog	Keyboards, sampling
2013	Fanfare	Jonathan Wilson	Moog synthesizer
2013	This Is Where We Are	Priscilla Ahn	Producer, keyboards, sampling
2013	Tanita Tikaram	Tanita Tikaram	Keyboards, piano, synthesizer
2012	Storm & Grace	Lisa Marie Presley	Keyboards
2012	The Hunger Games	Secret Sisters	Keyboards, piano
2012	Fear Fun	Father John Misty	Piano, synthesizers, mellotron
2012	Pines	A Fine Frenzy	Producer, keyboards, piano, pump organ, vibraphone, programming
2011	Jeff Bridges	Jeff Bridges	Keyboards, piano
2011	Vows	Kimbra	Producer
2011	T-Bone Burnett Presents The Speaking Clock Revue: Live from the Beacon Theatre	T Bone Burnett	Keyboards
2011	I'll Never Get Out of This World Alive	Steve Earle	Mellotron
2011	Reverie	Joe Henry	Keyboards, piano
2010	The Union	Elton John and Leon Russell	Keyboards
2010	Women + Country	Jakob Dylan	Keyboards
2010	The Long Surrender	Over the Rhine	Keyboards
2010	Silent Movies	Marc Ribot	Keyboards, soundscape
2010	Smash Up	Vincent & Mr. Green	Band member, producer, musician
2010	We Walk This Road	Robert Randolph & the Family Band	Keyboards
2010	Pro Whoa	Nikka Costa	Producer, keyboards, piano
2009	A Stranger Here	Ramblin' Jack Elliott	Keyboards, piano
2009	Blood From Stars	Joe Henry	Keyboards, piano, vibraphone
2008	A Love Extreme	Benji Hughes	Co-producer, composer
2008	Pebble to a Pearl	Nikka Costa	Clavinet, Moog synthesizer, voice box
2008	Saving Grace theme song	Everlast	Producer
2008	Legend of Kung Folk, Pt. 1	Ben Taylor	Producer, keyboards, Moog, drum programming
2008	Pain Language	DJ Muggs vs Planet Asia	Keyboards
2007	The Story	Brandi Carlile	Keyboards
2007	A Hundred Miles or More: A Collection	Alison Krauss	Piano
2007	Love, War and the Ghost of Whitey Ford	Everlast	Producer, composer, keyboards, piano, bass, drums, programming, engineer
2007	Saving Grace theme song	Everlast	Producer
2006	The True False Identity	T Bone Burnett	Keyboards, piano
2006	Thunderbird	Cassandra Wilson	Co-producer (with T Bone Burnett), arranger, keyboards, piano, synthesizer strings, electric bass, programming, engineer
2006	Slimkid3's Cafe	Tre Hardson	Producer, composer
2005	Extraordinary Machine	Fiona Apple	Keyboards
2005	Retrospective: 1995–2005	Natalie Merchant	Hammond B3
2005	Hell Yes remix	Beck	Producer, re-mix
2005	E-Pro remix	Beck	Producer, re-mix
2004	White Trash Beautiful	Everlast	Keyboards
2004	Shamrocks & Shenanigans	House of Pain	Keyboards, bass
2004	Unfinished Symphony	daKAH	Moog synthesizer, claves
2004	Vincent & Mr. Green	Vincent & Mr. Green	Band member, producer, composer, musician
2004	Color Me Funky	Weapon of Choice	Band member, keyboards
2002	C'mon, C'mon	Sheryl Crow	Keyboards, organ, clavinet, string samples
2001	The ID	Macy Gray	Composer, synthesizer, Farfisa organ
2000	Eat at Whitey's	Everlast	Keyboards
1998	Whitey Ford Sings the Blues	Everlast	Keyboards
1998	Nutmeg Phantasy	Weapon of Choice	Band member, keyboards
1996	Highperspice	Weapon of Choice	Band member, keyboards, vocals
1996	Moy	The Jade Vincent Experiment	Band member, producer, composer, musician
1996	I Am L.V.	L.V	Band member, producer, composer, musician
1995	Foe Life (featuring Ice Cube)	Mack 10	Keyboards
1994	'N Gatz We Truss	South Central Cartel	Keyboards, Moog synthesizer, claves
1994	Nut-Meg Sez "Bozo the Town"	Weapon of Choice	Band member, keyboards
1993	Bop Gun (One Nation)	Ice Cube	Keyboards

== Film and TV music ==
Title	Credits	Year
Eric	Composer	2024
Great Expectations	Composer	2023
He's Watching	Composer	2022
Limitless with Chris Hemsworth	Composer	2022
Killing Eve - Season 1, 2, 3 & 4	Composer	2021
Made for Love - Season 1 & 2	Composer	2021
Living in the Future's Past	Composer	2018
Baby Driver	Recording artist	2017
Devil's Gate	Composer	2017
Eyewitness	Composer	2016
Mindhorn	Composer	2016
Criminal Activities	Composer	2015
Strangerland	Composer	2015
London Spy	Composer	2015 - 2016
As Above, So Below	Composer	2014
True Detective – Season 1, 2, & 3	Composer	2014, 2015, 2019
A Place at the Table	Composer	2014 - 2015
The Fall - Season 1, 2 & 3	Composer, music producer	2013 - 2016
Diana	Composer, music producer	2013
Nashville– Season 1	Composer, music producer	2012 - 2013
The Hunger Games	Keyboards	2011
Good Vibrations	Composer	2011
Motel Life	Composer	2011
Brandon Generator	Composer, music producer	2011
Saving Grace - Season 1, 2, 3 & 4	Composer (theme song: "Saving Grace")	2008 - 2010
K7	Composer	2006
The Poughkeepsie Tapes	Composer	2007
Superbad	Keyboards, farfisa organ	2007
Across the Universe	Musician	2007
Shadowboxer	Composer	2005
Don't Come Knocking	Composer/performer	2005
Spider-Man 2	Composer (featured song)	2004
The Lady Killers	Music producer	2004
Divine Secrets of the Ya-Ya Sisterhood	Music producer	2002
Ali	Composer	2001
