= A Fine Frenzy Live at the House of Blues Chicago =

Live album by A Fine Frenzy
- Released: November 23, 2009
- Recorded: September 14, 2009
- Venue: House of Blues
- Genre: Adult alternative; indie rock
- Label: Virgin

A Fine Frenzy chronology
Bomb in a Birdcage (2009)	A Fine Frenzy Live at the House of Blues Chicago (2009)	Pines (2012)

A Fine Frenzy Live at the House of Blues Chicago is a live album by A Fine Frenzy (the musical moniker for Alison Sudol), released on November 23, 2009 by Virgin Records.

== Background and composition ==
The album features ten songs, nine of which are from her 2007 debut album One Cell in the Sea: "Come On, Come Out", "You Picked Me", "Rangers", "Near to You", "The Minnow and the Trout", "Ashes and Wine", "Last of Days", "Borrowed Time", and "Almost Lover". The album also includes a cover version of "Fever" (Eddie Cooley, Otis Blackwell), which was originally recorded by American singer Little Willie John in 1956.

== Track listing ==
No.	Title	Writer(s)	Length
1.	"Come On, Come Out"	Alison Sudol, Lukas Burton, Hal Cragin	4:27
2.	"You Picked Me"	Burton, Cragin, Sudol	4:47
3.	"Last of Days"	Sudol	4:13
4.	"Near to You"	Sudol	5:43
5.	"The Minnow and the Trout"	Sudol	5:21
6.	"Ashes and Wine"	Sudol, Burton, Cragin	5:27
7.	"Fever"	Eddie Cooley, Otis Blackwell	1:29
8.	"Borrowed Time"	Sudol, Gus Black	3:45
9.	"Almost Lover"	Sudol	5:23
10.	"Rangers"	Sudol, Burton, Cragin	4:22

Track listing adapted from iTunes.
