= Extreme Love =

Extreme Love may refer to:

- "Extreme Love", a song by Holly Herndon from her 2019 album Proto
- Extreme Love: Autism, a 2012 documentary by Louis Theroux
- Extreme Love: Dementia, a 2012 documentary by Louis Theroux
- Extreme Love, a 2018 unscripted TV series on We TV channel

== See also ==
- A Love Extreme, the first studio album by musician Benji Hughes
