= Home: My Song Diary =

Home ~ My Song Diary

Studio album by Priscilla Ahn
- Released: October 31, 2012
- Genre: Indie pop
- Length: 49:52
- Label: EMI Music Japan

Priscilla Ahn chronology
Natural Colors (2012)	Home ~ My Song Diary (2012)	This Is Where We Are (2014)

Home ~ My Song Diary is a compilation album by Priscilla Ahn. It was released in Japan on October 31, 2012.

== Track listing ==
No.	Title	Writer(s)	Length
1.	"I'll Be Here"	Priscilla Ahn	2:42
2.	"In A Tree" (from In A Tree EP)	Priscilla Ahn	2:28
3.	"Song Of Hope" (from Natural Colors)	Priscilla Ahn	3:25
4.	"Sukiyaki"		3:26
5.	"Dream" (from A Good Day)	Priscilla Ahn	3:31
6.	"I Don't Have Time To Be In Love" (from When You Grow Up)	Priscilla Ahn, Charles Wadhams	3:24
7.	"Are We Different" (from In A Tree EP)	Priscilla Ahn	2:29
8.	"I Don't Think So" (from A Good Day)	Priscilla Ahn	2:18
9.	"Find My Way Back Home" (from A Good Day)	Priscilla Ahn	2:27
10.	"Country Roads (Acoustic)" (When You Grow Up Japan Bonus Track)	John Denver, Bill Danoff, Taffy Nivert	2:50
11.	"I'll Be Here (English Acoustic Version)"	Priscilla Ahn	3:14
