= Slow Magic: 1977-1978 =

Studio album by Jeff Bridges
- Released: April 12, 2025
- Label: Light in the Attic Records
- Producers: Jeff Bridges, Ken Lauber

Jeff Bridges chronology
Sleeping Tapes (2015)	Slow Magic: 1977-1978 (2025)

Professional ratings
Review scores
Source	Rating
Far Out Magazine	4.5/5

Slow Magic: 1977-1978 is an album by American actor and singer-songwriter Jeff Bridges. Previously unreleased, the album was recorded in the late 1970s.

== Background ==
In the 1970s, Bridges would host jam sessions with old high school friends including Stan Ayeroff and David Greenwalt, bassist Matthew Bright, and drummer Steve Baim.

There were rules to the jam, the main one being that no songs were allowed. Even songs that we were writing weren't allowed. It was just a free-form jam, playing instruments that you don't know how to play - a saxophone, just hanging from the rafters by a piano string - and anybody could go just, (vocalizing), you know, wail on it.

Over time, songs were written and eventually they decided to record a few on a TEAC four track recorder. The session included new personnel including Burgess Meredith and members of Oingo Boingo. The tape was later forgotten and decades later Bridges rediscovered the tape and began working on preparing it for release with the assistance of friend Keefus Ciancia and Matt Sullivan of Light in the Attic Records. The album was mastered by John Baldwin. In April 2025, Light in the Attic Records released the album.

== Track listing ==
Slow Magic: 1977-1978 track listing
No.	Title	Length
1.	"He's Here"	00:45
2.	"Obnoxious"	5:02
3.	"Attitude"	3:03
4.	"Space #1"	1:57
5.	"Slow Magic"	3:12
6.	"Here On This Island"	3:54
7.	"Light Blues"	2:58
8.	"This Is The One"	3:27
9.	"Space #2"	2:50
10.	"You Could Be Ready"	2:34
11.	"Kong"	8:10
