= Oh Blue Christmas =

2009 EP by A Fine Frenzy

EP by A Fine Frenzy
- Released: November 3, 2009
- Recorded: Dave's Room, Los Angeles
- Genre: Pop rock
- Length: 21:49
- Label: Virgin
- Producer: David Bianco; Alison Sudol

A Fine Frenzy chronology
Bomb in a Birdcage (2009)	Oh Blue Christmas (2009)	Pines (2012)

Oh Blue Christmas is an EP by the American band A Fine Frenzy that was released in November 2009 in the United States by Virgin Records. It was initially released exclusively through Target two months after the release of the band's previous studio album Bomb in a Birdcage. The EP contains cover versions of three popular holiday songs—"Blue Christmas", "Winter Wonderland" and "Christmas Time Is Here" from A Charlie Brown Christmas—as well as three original tracks. According to Alison Sudol, A Fine Frenzy's leader, the collection of songs was recorded in five days at record producer David Bianco's studio in Los Angeles.

The EP—and "Christmas Time Is Here" in particular—received positive critical reception overall. In the United States, Oh Blue Christmas peaked at number 87 on the Billboard 200, at number three on Billboard's Top Holiday Albums chart and at number 28 on the Top Rock Albums chart. A Fine Frenzy was touring the United States when Bomb in a Birdcage and Oh Blue Christmas were released.

== Composition ==
Oh Blue Christmas has a duration of approximately 22 minutes and includes renditions of three popular holiday songs: "Blue Christmas" (Billy Hayes, Jay W. Johnson), "Winter Wonderland" (Felix Bernard, Richard B. Smith), and "Christmas Time Is Here" (Vince Guaraldi, Lee Mendelson). The latter originally appeared on the 1965 television special A Charlie Brown Christmas and the soundtrack of the same name. The EP also includes three original tracks; "Redribbon Foxes", "Winter White" and "Wish You Well". Of "Redribbon Foxes", Sudol stated:

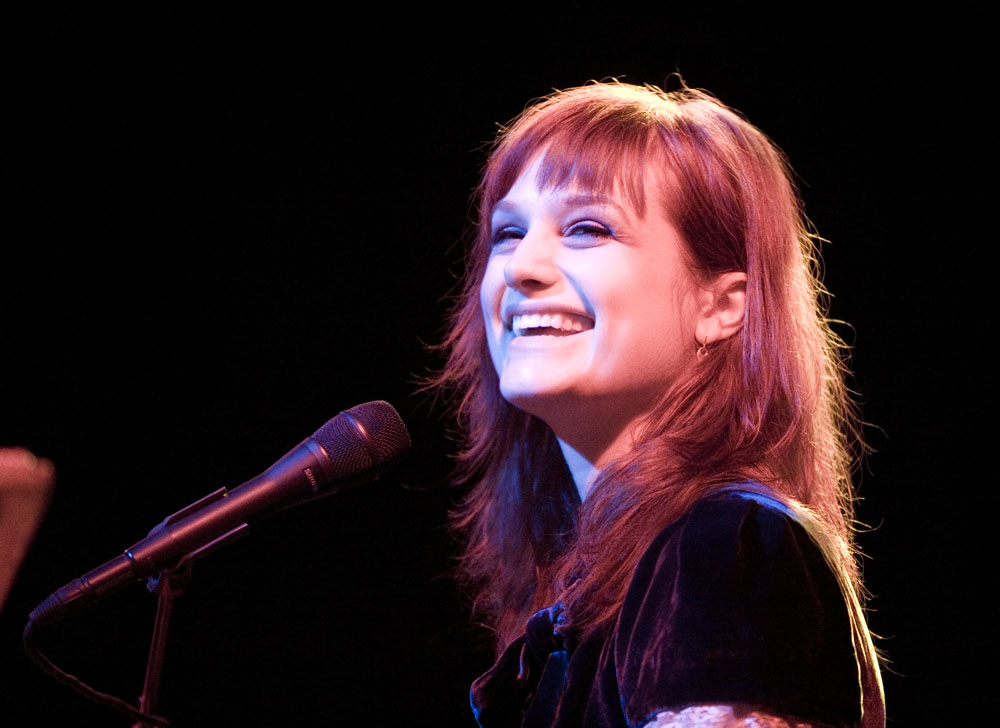
Alison Sudol in 2008

...when I was writing it, I was in a cabin covered with snow and it was very quiet outside. This was all in my head, of course. Down a hill there's a little town, all lit up, carolers singing. It's a little bit sad, although it's very beautiful. There's a little fox creeping through the snow, a fox that's very hard to catch.

Sudol said "Winter White" was the "first genuinely heart-achy song" she had ever written and that "Wish You Well" is about a family member. According to Sudol, the group "expand[ed] its sound" by incorporating horns, mandolins and pedal steel guitars. The EP was recorded in five days at record producer David Bianco's studio Dave's Room, in Los Angeles. She said of the recording process:

We all holed up in (producer) David Bianco's lovely studio, which was built in the '70s and hasn't changed much since then—and though it was the sticky, hot LA summer outside, inside, it was snowy, delightful Christmastime. We..[recorded] everything together around an invisible campfire; everyone picking up different instruments and playing them on a moment's notice. There was definitely some holiday magic in the air that week.

== Reception ==
Professional ratings
Review scores
Source	Rating
Albany Democrat-Herald	(positive)
AllMusic	3/5 stars
RedEye	(positive)

Cory Frye of the Albany Democrat-Herald described Sudol's overall performance as "sultry" and called "Redribbon Foxes" a standout original track. In his review for AllMusic, Andrew Leahey wrote that the cover songs are "perfectly pleasant" and that Sudol's original songs are the highlight of the collection. Leahey complimented Sudol's "lilting, whimsical" performance and said the song "Redribbon Foxes" has a broader appeal. Brian Moore of RedEye, a Chicago Tribune publication, said the EP contained both traditional and indie qualities and described Sudol's voice as "smooth, velvety and well-suited for holiday music". OffBeat's Alex Rawls said the EP was more "wintry" than "Christmas-y", more melancholic than celebratory, and only "Wish You Well" evoked a warm, joyous tone. One reviewer for Skope Magazine described the collection as "whimsical".

"Christmas Time Is Here" in particular received positive critical reception. Moore and Rawls called the song the best track on the EP. Rawls called it the collection's "finest moment", having "evocative sounds that swell and recede". Frye described the track as "bone-chilling", and Brandon Ferguson of OC Weekly called it "nostalgia-inducing".

== Track listing ==
No.	Title	Writer(s)	Length
1.	"Blue Christmas"	Billy Hayes, Jay W. Johnson	3:20
2.	"Winter Wonderland"	Felix Bernard, Richard B. Smith	3:43
3.	"Redribbon Foxes"	Alison Sudol	5:01
4.	"Winter White"	Alison Sudol	2:55
5.	"Wish You Well"	Alison Sudol	3:53
6.	"Christmas Time Is Here"	Vince Guaraldi, Lee Mendelson	2:57

Track listing adapted from AllMusic.

== Personnel ==
- Felix Bernard – composer
- David Bianco – engineer, mixing, producer
- C. J. Camerieri – backing vocals, cornet, French horn, handclapping, trumpet
- Omar Cowan – acoustic bass, acoustic guitar, backing vocals, bass, electric bass, guitar, handclapping, mandolin
- Cole Gerst – design, illustrations
- Vince Guaraldi – composer
- Billy Hayes – composer
- Ted Jensen – mastering
- Jay W. Johnson – composer
- Stephen LeBlanc – backing vocals, chimes, Hammond B3, handclapping, harmonium, piano, Wurlitzer
- Ryan Lerman – acoustic guitar, backing vocals, double bass, electric guitar, handclapping
- Lee Mendelson – composer
- Joshua Sarubin – A&R
- Jesse Siebenberg – backing vocals, drums, electric guitar, handclapping, percussion
- Richard B. Smith – composer
- Alison Sudol – composer, handclapping, piano, producer, vocals

Credits adapted from AllMusic.

== Chart performance ==
Oh Blue Christmas charted in the United States, peaking at number 87 on the Billboard 200, at number three on Billboard's Top Holiday Albums chart and at number 28 on the Top Rock Albums chart.

Chart (2010)	Peak position
U.S. Billboard 200	87
Top Holiday Albums	3
Top Rock Albums	28
