= Unloved (band) =

American band

Unloved is an alternative music trio formed in Los Angeles in 2015, by American musicians Jade Vincent and Keefus Ciancia, and Northern Irish musician David Holmes. Songs from their 2016 debut album Guilty of Love and 2019 follow-up album Heartbreak were used as the basis of the soundtrack to the BBC America television series Killing Eve (2018–2022). Ciancia and Holmes also provided original material for the soundtrack, for which they won the 2019 BAFTA TV Craft Award for Original Music.

== Discography ==
=== Studio albums ===
- Guilty of Love (2016)
- Heartbreak (2019)
- The Pink Album (2022)
- Polychrome (2023)

=== Singles and EPs ===
- "Guilty of Love" (2015)
- "When a Woman Is Around" (2016)
- "This Is the Time" (2016)
- "Heartbreak" (2018)
- "Strange Effect" (2020)
