= Natural Colors =

Studio album by Priscilla Ahn
- Released: June 27, 2012
- Genre: Indie pop
- Length: 49:52
- Label: EMI Music Japan

Priscilla Ahn chronology
When You Grow Up (2011)	Natural Colors (2012)	Home ~ My Song Diary (2012)

Natural Colors is a covers album by Priscilla Ahn, sung in both English and Japanese. It was released in Japan on June 27, 2012 and reached a peak position of 186 on the Oricon Albums Chart. Ahn explained that the idea for the album started with her desire to record a collection of songs used in Studio Ghibli films before expanding to include other songs that she enjoyed.

== Track listing ==
No.	Title	Writer(s)	Length
1.	"Daydream Believer" (originally recorded by The Monkees)	John Stewart	4:04
2.	"Kaze No Tani No Nausica" (originally recorded by Narumi Yasuda)	Takashi Matsumoto, Haruomi Hosono	4:47
3.	"Sayonara COLOR (English Version)" (originally recorded by Super Butter Dog)	Takashi Nagazumi	4:49
4.	"Bara No Hana" (originally recorded by Quruli)	Shigeru Kishida	5:03
5.	"Norwegian Wood (The Bird Has Flown)" (originally recorded by The Beatles)	John Lennon, Paul McCartney	2:20
6.	"Yasashisa Ni Tsutsumaretanara" (originally recorded by Yumi Matsutoya)	Yumi Matsutoya	4:12
7.	"Kaerenai Futari" (originally recorded by Yosui Inoue)	Yosui Inoue, Kiyoshiro Imawano	4:40
8.	"T'en va pas" (originally recorded by Elsa Lunghini)	Catherine Levy, Regis Marie Wagnier	3:46
9.	"Kaze Wo Atsumete" (originally recorded by Happy End)	Takashi Matsumoto, Haruomi Hosono	4:10
10.	"Song Of Hope (with Japanese lyrics)"	Priscilla Ahn	3:28
11.	"Dream (with Japanese lyrics)"	Priscilla Ahn	3:44
12.	"Sayonara COLOR" (originally recorded by Super Butter Dog)	Takashi Nagazumi	4:49
