= Songs in the Key of Animals =

Studio album by Benji Hughes
- Released: January 29, 2016
- Genre: Rock
- Length: 41:24
- Label: Merge

Benji Hughes chronology
A Love Extreme (2008)	Songs in the Key of Animals (2016)

Professional ratings
Aggregate scores
Source	Rating
Metacritic	57/100
Review scores
Source	Rating
AllMusic	3/5 stars
Pitchfork	4.8/10
The Skinny	3/5 stars

Songs in the Key of Animals is the second studio album by American musician Benji Hughes. It was released in 2016 under Merge Records.

== Critical reception ==
Relix called the album "12 deliciously weird, lo-fi keyboard pop tunes, with Hughes’ restrained vocals occasionally adorned by soulful backup vocals or muted horns." PopMatters wrote that "Hughes’ vast spectrum of music knowledge is showcased all over this sound safari."

== Track listing ==
Disc one (Sal)
No.	Title	Length
1.	"Peacockin' Party"	2:39
2.	"Girls Love Shoes"	2:52
3.	"Shark Attack!!!!!!!!!!"	2:24
4.	"Zebra"	4:06
5.	"Fall Me in Love"	3:28
6.	"Sugartree"	1:58
7.	"Freaky Feedback Blues"	3:44

Disc two (Mon)
No.	Title	Length
1.	"Magic Summertime"	3:52
2.	"Picnic"	3:06
3.	"Longshot"	3:50
4.	"Song for Nancy"	5:49
5.	"Take You Home"	3:36

An older version of the album with a different track order, minor differences to track intros/outros and one additional song was released in 2014 simultaneously with the albums XXOXOXX and OXOXOXOXOX as a 4 disc set.

== Original track listing ==
Disc one (Sal)
No.	Title	Length
1.	"Magic Summertime"	3:54
2.	"Shark Attack"	2:25
3.	"Boom Shaka La"	1:58
4.	"Fall Me in Love"	3:32
5.	"Girls Love Shoes"	2:56
6.	"Peacockin' Party"	2:42

Disc two (Mon)
No.	Title	Length
1.	"? Take You Home"	3:37
2.	"Chablis"	3:17
3.	"Freaky Feedback Blues"	3:44
4.	"Picnic"	3:08
5.	"Longshot"	3:54
6.	"Song for Nancy"	5:50
7.	"Zebra"	4:24
