= Blitz (Étienne Daho album) =

2017 album by Étienne Daho

Studio album by Étienne Daho
- Released: November 17, 2017
- Label: Capitol Records
- Producers: Etienne Daho, Fabien Waltmann, Jade Vincent, Jean-Louis Piérot, Keefus Ciancia

Blitz is the 11th studio album of French singer Étienne Daho, released on November 17, 2017.

== Background ==
The psychedelically-inspired album was written and recorded in London, with the "Blitz" of the title referring the city's climate after the Brexit vote and terrorist attacks. In addition to long-time collaborators Fabien Waltmann and Jean-Louis Piérot, Daho recorded with musicians from The Unloved (composer/producers David Holmes and Keefus Ciancia and singer Jade Vincent), whom he had met upon the release of their first album.

== Themes ==
The album's touchpoints are both personal and public: "Le jardin" (The Garden) is a tribute to his sister Jeanne, who died in 2016, while "Chambre 29" (Room 29) is dedicated to Pink Floyd founder Syd Barrett. "Les flocons de l'été" (The Flakes of Summer) evokes the month of August 2013, which Daho spent in a hospital room, nearly dying of peritonitis. The album's cover photo, where he appears dressed in leather and cap, surrounded by scrolls of smoke, was inspired by the Marlon Brando's performance in The Wild One and Charlotte Rampling in The Night Porter.

All tracks are written by Étienne Daho and Fabien Waltmann except where noted.

No.	Title	Writer(s)	Length
1.	"Les Filles du canyon"		5:36
2.	"Chambre 29"		4:20
3.	"Le Jardin"		3:55
4.	"Les Baisers rouges"	Étienne Daho, Fabien Waltmann, and Henry Levine	3:51
5.	"Les Cordages de la nuit"		4:08
6.	"Les Flocons de l'été"		3:35
7.	"Voodoo Voodoo"		3:13
8.	"L'Étincelle"	Étienne Daho and Jean-Louis Piérot	5:04
9.	"The Deep End"	David Holmes, Jade Vincent, and Keefus Ciancia	3:51
10.	"Hôtel des infidèles"		3:55
11.	"Après le blitz"	Étienne Daho and Jean-Louis Piérot	6:41
12.	"Nocturne"	Étienne Daho, Jade Vincent, and Keefus Ciancia	4:28
