= Jeff Bridges (album) =

Studio album by Jeff Bridges
- Released: August 16, 2011
- Recorded: Brooklyn, New York; Los Angeles, California
- Genre: Country
- Length: 40:11
- Label: Blue Note/EMI
- Producer: T-Bone Burnett

Jeff Bridges chronology
Be Here Soon (2000)	Jeff Bridges (2011)	Sleeping Tapes (2015)

Singles from Jeff Bridges
- 1. "What a Little Bit of Love Can Do" Released: August 15, 2011

Jeff Bridges is the self-titled second studio album of American actor and singer-songwriter Jeff Bridges. It was released on August 16, 2011, via Blue Note Records and EMI Records. On April 19, 2011, it was announced through CMT that Bridges had signed a recording contract with Blue Note Records and would work with producer T-Bone Burnett.

The song "What a Little Bit of Love Can Do" was released as the first single on August 15, 2011.

== Background ==
Bridges starred in the film Crazy Heart in 2009, where he portrayed a fallen country music singer. On the soundtrack to the film, Bridges sang five of the sixteen songs. In 2011, he signed with jazz music label Blue Note Records, where they announced Bridges would record and release his debut album later that year.

On May 23, 2011, the official track listing and other information regarding the album was released. Ryan Bingham, Rosanne Cash, Sam Phillips and Benji Hughes appear as guest vocalists on the album.

The opening track, "What a Little Bit of Love Can Do", was released as the lead-off single on August 15, 2011. It was released to Triple A radio format.

== Reception ==
=== Commercial ===
The album was expected to debut on the Billboard 200 within the Top 40, and did indeed debut at number 25 as well at number 10 on the Top Country Albums, number two on Folk Albums and number 5 on the Top Rock Albums chart. It has sold 345,000 copies.

=== Critical ===
Professional ratings
Review scores
Source	Rating
Allmusic	2.5/5 stars
Cinema Blend	3/5 stars
Engine145	3.5/5 stars
Rolling Stone	3/5 stars
Slant Magazine	3/5 stars
Taste of Country	1.5/5 stars
Spin	5/10

Sam Gazdziak, of Engine145, reviewed the album and gave the album three-and-a-half stars out of five. Gazdziak praised the album for its custom sound, along with each songwriter and guest vocalists. He described the album as "slow", noting that Bridges "growls" through the slower songs. Gazdziak also noted that "Tumbling Vine" and "Falling Short", songs Bridges wrote himself, are nicely sung and arranged, though they tend to be a little too dense and esoteric.

Spin gave the album a score of 5/10, writing, "Bridges' country-fried drawl gets wonky (see the shuffling 'Blue Car'), but when the pieces come together – as on laid-back, folksy charmers like 'Everything but Love' and 'Maybe I Missed the Point' – the result is as comfortable and unpretentious as the Dude's bathrobe."

Taste of Country reviewer Billy Dukes gave the album a one-and-half out of five-star rating. Dukes criticized the album for being too slow, and compared the album to teenagers at a bowling alley playing a game. Dukes closed his review by saying that "if [Bridges] wants his music career to take off, [Bridges] may be wise to ask Bad Blake, Bridges' character in Crazy Heart, how he'd sing these songs."

Stephen Thomas Erlewine, of Allmusic, rated the album two-and-a-half stars out of five. He criticized T-Bone Burnett for making the album "artificially authentic" and "drowsy Americana mythology". He also said that Bridges is trying to be cool, and that the production of the album resembled a "shuffling snail".

Rolling Stone gave the album three stars out of five. Reviewer Will Hermes pointed out that "What a Little Bit of Love Can Do" is the highlight of the album. Hermes also praised Bridges' leathery voice, which makes the music sound "lived-in".

== Track listing ==
Jeff Bridges track listing
No.	Title	Writer(s)	Length
1.	"What a Little Bit of Love Can Do"	Stephen Bruton, Gary Nicholson	3:38
2.	"Falling Short"	Jeff Bridges	3:19
3.	"Everything But Love"	John Goodwin	4:26
4.	"Tumbling Vine"	Bridges	2:29
5.	"Nothing Yet"	Bruton	4:28
6.	"Blue Car"	Greg Brown	4:24
7.	"Maybe I Missed the Point"	Goodwin	3:31
8.	"Slow Boat"	Bridges, Burnett, Thomas Cobb	6:01
9.	"Either Way"	Robert Franklin Ramsey	4:53
10.	"The Quest"	Goodwin	2:56

== Personnel ==
- Jay Bellerose – drums
- Ryan Bingham – background vocals
- Jeff Bridges – vocals, background vocals
- T Bone Burnett electric bass, acoustic guitar, electric guitar, tremolo guitar
- Rosanne Cash – background vocals
- Keefus Ciancia – keyboards, piano
- Dennis Crouch – bass
- Benji Hughes – background vocals
- Blake Mills – electric baritone guitar
- Russ Pahl – acoustic guitar, electric guitar, pedal steel guitar
- Sam Phillips – background vocals
- Marc Ribot – acoustic guitar, electric guitar, electric baritone guitar, hi-string acoustic guitar
- Jackson Smith – electric baritone guitar, electric guitar

== Chart performance ==
Chart performance for Jeff Bridges
Chart (2011)	Peak
US Billboard 200	25
US Billboard Top Country Albums	10
US Billboard Top Folk Albums	2
US Billboard Top Rock Albums	5
