= When You Grow Up =

Studio album by Priscilla Ahn
- Released: May 3, 2011
- Recorded: Fall of 2010, Los Angeles
- Length: 44:56
- Label: Blue Note
- Producer: Ethan Johns

Priscilla Ahn chronology
A Good Day (2008)	When You Grow Up (2011)	Natural Colors (2012)

Professional ratings
Review scores
Source	Rating
AllMusic	3.5/5 stars
PopMatters	8/10

When You Grow Up is the second studio album by American singer–songwriter Priscilla Ahn. The album was released May 3, 2011 on Blue Note Records.

== Critical reception ==
In a review for AllMusic, critic reviewer Andrew Leahey wrote: "Despite the heavy guest list, When You Grow Up still feels more personal than Ahn’s 2008 debut, which found her dabbling in indie pop, torch songs, and Norah Jones-styled jazz. She focuses on folk this time around, consolidating her strengths while exploring every quirky corner of the genre."

== Track listing ==
When You Grow Up track listing
No.	Title	Writer(s)	Length
1.	"When You Grow Up"	Priscilla Ahn; Jake Blanton	3:02
2.	"One Day I Will Do"	Ahn	4:16
3.	"Oo La La"	Ahn; Eleni Mandell	3:22
4.	"Vibe So Hot"	Benji Hughes	3:12
5.	"City Lights (Pretty Lights)"	Ahn; Inara George	3:23
6.	"I Don’t Have Time To Be In Love"	Ahn; Charlie Wadhams	3:26
7.	"Cry Baby"	Ahn	3:14
8.	"Lost Cause"	Ahn	4:09
9.	"Empty House"	Ahn	4:26
10.	"I Will Get Over You"	Ahn; Sia Furler	3:42
11.	"Elf Song"	Ahn	4:16
12.	"Torch Song"	Ahn	5:37

iTunes Japan bonus tracks
No.	Title	Writer(s)	Length
13.	"Love"	John Lennon	2:33
14.	"Take Me Home, Country Roads" (acoustic)	John Denver; Bill Danoff; Catherine Danoff	2:50
15.	"Thank God"		4:06
