= Just Know That I Love You =

Studio album by Priscilla Ahn
- Released: 16 July 2014
- Genre: Indie pop
- Length: 35:59
- Label: Yamaha Music Communications

Priscilla Ahn chronology
This Is Where We Are (2014)	Just Know That I Love You (2014)

Singles from Just Know That I Love You
- 1. "Fine on the Outside" Released: 2 July 2014

Just Know That I Love You, known as Anata no Koto ga Daisuki (あなたのことが大好き, , lit. "I Love You") in Japan, is an album by American recording artist and musician Priscilla Ahn. The album was inspired by the Joan G. Robinson novel When Marnie Was There and written for the anime film adaptation of the novel, released by Studio Ghibli in 2014.

== Release ==
The album was released on CD in Japan, and in 113 countries worldwide (including Japan) as a digital download on the iTunes Store on 16 July 2014. It reached #58 on the Oricon charts during the week of 28 July 2014 and remained on them for 10 weeks.

== Track listing ==
All tracks are written by Priscilla Ahn.

No.	Title	Length
1.	"Fine on the Outside"	4:12
2.	"Deep Inside My Heart"	3:43
3.	"Pretty Dress"	2:23
4.	"I See You"	3:58
5.	"Marnie"	3:07
6.	"This Old House"	3:19
7.	"With You"	3:45
8.	"You're a Star"	3:45
9.	"Waltzing Memories"	3:31
10.	"I Am Not Alone"	4:12
Total length:		35:54
