= His Way, Our Way =

Compilation album by Various artists
- Released: July 7, 2009
- Recorded: 2009

His Way, Our Way is a Frank Sinatra tribute album project released exclusively through iTunes on July 7, 2009. It contains 13 new tracks by contemporary performers covering songs recorded by Sinatra.

== Reception ==
The Irish Times gave a four-star rating to the track "Willow Weep for Me" by The Kills, calling it a "surprisingly stripped-back version". NME also recommended The Kills track, but called the ones by Maroon 5 and The Kooks "dubious homages".

== Track listing ==
1. "The Way You Look Tonight" (Maroon 5)
2. "One More For My Baby (and One More for the Road)" (John Rich)
3. "The Things We Did Last Summer" (A Fine Frenzy)
4. "Stormy Weather" (The Kooks)
5. "Fly Me to the Moon (In Other Words)" (Joshua Radin)
6. "I'll Never Smile Again" (Priscilla Ahn)
7. "I've Got You Under My Skin" (Seether)
8. "Something Stupid" (The Fashion)
9. "London By Night" (Greg Laswell)
10. "Strangers In the Night" (The Morning Benders)
11. "All of Me" (Meiko)
12. "The Impossible Dream" (Republic Tigers)
13. "Willow Weep for Me" (The Kills)
