= This Is Where We Are =

Studio album by Priscilla Ahn
- Released: 19 July 2013 (Japan); 25 July 2013 (Korea); 15 February 2014 (USA)
- Genre: Synthpop, Indie pop
- Length: 38:42
- Label: SQE Music, Universal Music LLC

Priscilla Ahn chronology
Home ~ My Song Diary (2012)	This Is Where We Are (2013)	Just Know That I Love You (2014)

Priscilla Ahn's album This Is Where We Are was released in the US on 15 February 2014. It was released in Japan on 19 July 2013 and later in Korea and Taiwan. All songs on the album were performed by Priscilla Ahn.

== Track listing ==
No.	Title	Writer(s)	Length
1.	"Diana"	Priscilla Ahn and Keefus Ciancia	4:33
2.	"Remember How I Broke Your Heart"	Ahn	2:35
3.	"This Is Where We Are"	Ahn	3:12
4.	"Home"	Ahn	3:40
5.	"I Can't Fall Asleep"	Ahn	3:47
6.	"Loop"	Ahn	3:06
7.	"Your Name"	Ahn	1:06
8.	"Wedding March"	Ahn	3:13
9.	"Ooooooo"	Ahn	2:55
10.	"Closetlude"	Keefus Ciancia	0:58
11.	"In a Closet in the Middle of the Night"	Ahn	3:43
12.	"You and Me"	Ahn	2:25
13.	"I Think I'm Ready to Love You"	Ahn	3:29
14.	"Stop, Look, Lie (Japan release)"	Ahn	3:09
15.	"I'll Be Here -English Version- (Japan release)"	Ahn	2:43
16.	"Kaze (Japan release)"	Hashida Norihiko	3:35
17.	"It Began With a Fallen Leaf (Taiwan release)"	Ahn, Greeny Wu	3:35

== Tour ==
Ahn toured Japan, South Korea, and Taiwan in July and August 2013 to support her album. She toured the US in May 2014.

== Reception ==
SQE Music released "Diana," the first track from the album, on 11 December 2013, about which Filter Magazine commented "The verses showcase her airy vocals before they harmonize with layers of synths, beats and strings that, together, evoke an ethereal, dreamy sound."

Jacqueline Caruso, writing for The Deli, said that "Diana" "has all the sweetness, euphoria, and mystery of paragliding across a rainbow."
