= Priscilla Ahn =

American musician (born 1984)

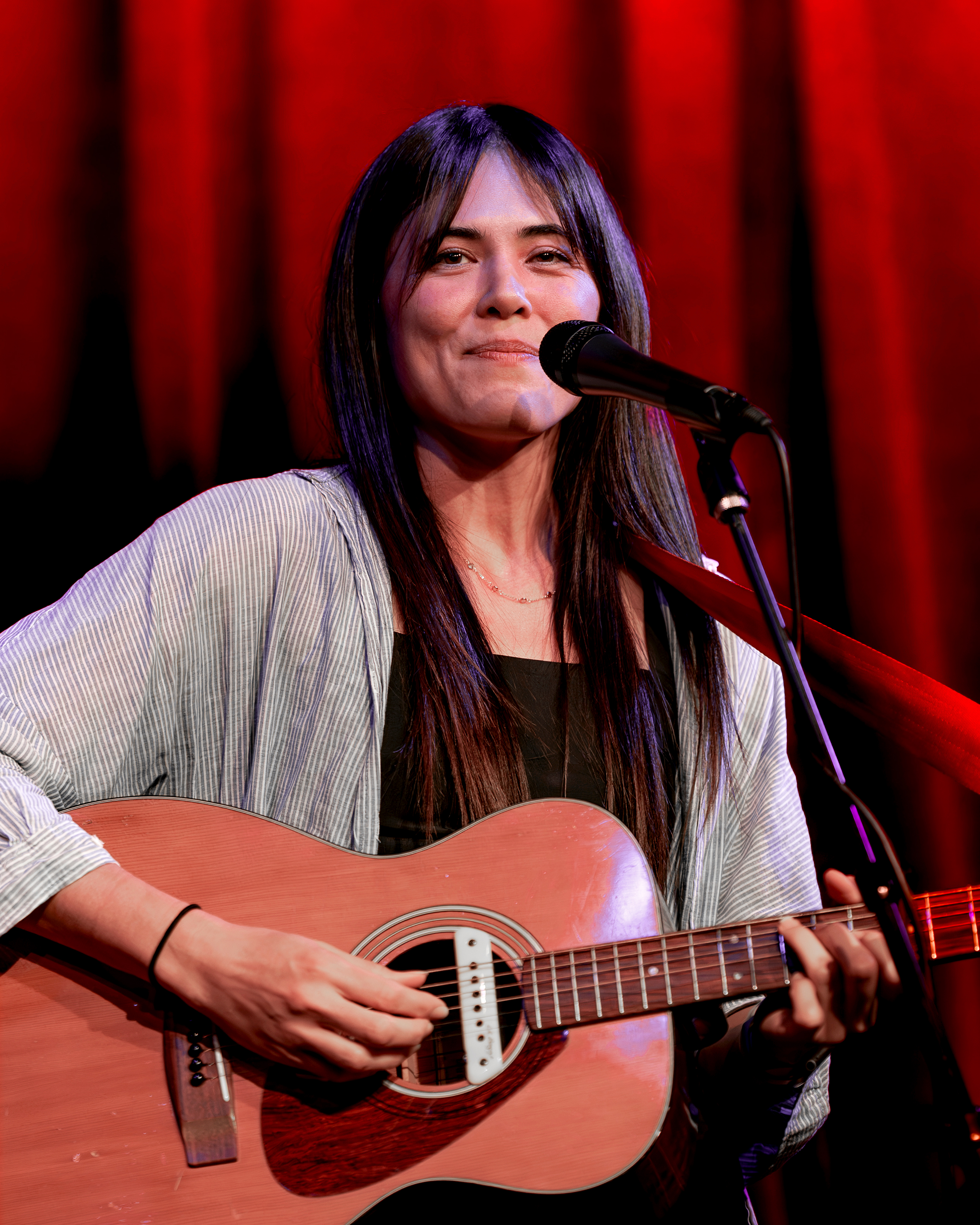
- Ahn in 2026

Background information
- Born: Priscilla Natalie Hartranft; 1984 (age 41–42); Fort Stewart, Georgia, U.S.
- Genres: Acoustic; folk; indie folk
- Instruments: Vocals; guitar; piano; melodica; harmonica; ukulele; banjo
- Years active: 2003–present
- Label: Blue Note
- Spouse: Michael Weston (m. 2010)
- Website: www.priscillaahn.world

Priscilla Ahn (born Priscilla Natalie Hartranft; 1984) is an American singer, songwriter and multi-instrumentalist. She released her single "Dream" from her debut album, A Good Day, produced by Joey Waronker for EMI's Blue Note Records, in 2008. After growing up in Pennsylvania and graduating from high school, Ahn moved to Los Angeles, California, adopted her mother's Korean maiden name, and began to pursue a music career.

Ahn has toured with Willie Nelson, Amos Lee (for whom she sang backup vocals), Ray LaMontagne, Devotchka and Joshua Radin. Her collaborative efforts include Tiësto's "I Am Strong", Cary Brothers' "Maps" and Ashtar Command's "The Breakup Song".

Ahn has released several albums, including A Good Day, When You Grow Up, and This Is Where We Are. She has toured internationally, including tours in Japan, China, Korea and the US.

== Early life ==
Priscilla Natalie Hartranft was born in Fort Stewart, Georgia, to Kay (née Ahn) and Harry Hartranft. Her family visited South Korea, where her mother is from, several times. Her parents met when her father was stationed there while in the military.

Ahn spent her childhood growing up in Berks County, Pennsylvania, and attended Tulpehocken Area High School. She started playing guitar and harmonica at the age of 14 and performed in choirs and musical productions throughout high school. After graduation her music professors Charles Eckhart and Douglas Crowder encouraged her to pursue her music career full-time. She soon moved to Los Angeles.

She took her mother's maiden name as her stage name, saying, "Ahn is so much prettier and simpler. It’s also an ode to my Korean background, which is where I get my musical genes from.”

== Career ==
After years of performing at open mic nights, Priscilla Ahn played a showcase in New York City for Blue Note Records and was signed to the label. In 2008, Blue Note Records released her full-length debut album, A Good Day, produced by Joey Waronker. The following June, Ahn went on a national tour. Her album, A Good Day included musical contributions by keyboardists Greg Kurstin, Keefus Ciancia, guitarist Mike Andrews, musical saw player Ursula Knudsun, cellist and string arranger Oliver Kraus, keyboardist Larry Goldings and singers Jim Gilstrap and Orin Waters.

Ahn has toured with Joshua Radin, Amos Lee, Willie Nelson and Ray Lamontagne and contributed vocals to the albums Supply and Demand, Mission Bell and Kaleidoscope. She was selected as Artist of the Week in Paste magazine in June 2008.

Ahn's songs have appeared on the television shows Grey's Anatomy, Knight Rider, Make It Or Break It, Married Single Other, several episodes of the Ghost Whisperer, and in the films Disturbia, Bride Wars, Love Happens, My Sister's Keeper, Free Willy: Escape from Pirate's Cove and Moms' Night Out.

After contributing to the compilations album, His Way, Our Way, Priscilla Ahn collaborated with Inara George, Sia, Eleni Mandell, Charlie Wadhams and Jake Blanton on her album When You Grow Up which was produced by Ethan Johns.

Ahn appeared on The Tonight Show with Jay Leno in May 2011 and ABC's Dancing with the Stars, performing songs from her debut A Good Day and the title track from When You Grow Up.

After a period of writer's block, Ahn isolated herself in a remote desert hotel to create new music for the album This is Where We Are. "I found the whole thing really inspiring, and suddenly, all these songs came pouring out. I just needed a little isolation and focus, some new sounds to play with, and a carefree, 'this is just an experiment' attitude to begin writing again." This Is Where We Are was released in Japan on 19 July 2013 and later in Korea and Taiwan and was released in the US on 15 February 2014.

She also composed and performed music for the Ghibli film When Marnie Was There directed by Hiromasa Yonebayashi including the soundtrack in the credit sequence Fine on the Outside, as well as nine other songs based on the film which were published in an album When Marnie Was There Song Album - Just Know That I Love You.

Ahn's music is described as grounded in folk, country, and pop. Ahn explored electropop music in the album This Is Where We Are. Of the album's stylistic departure, she said, "I like to let things naturally flow out when I’m writing, and be whatever they’ll be. I think the biggest reason why this album ended up sounding so different from my previous two is because I wrote most of these songs on a keyboard, instead of my guitar. I bought a keyboard, learned how to use Logic Pro, and used their basic audio samples as a songwriting tool. It opened up a whole new world to me sonically, and all these new songs just came pouring out."

== Personal life ==
Ahn married actor Michael Weston in May 2010. They have two children.

== Discography ==
=== Albums ===
Title	Album details	Peak chart positions	
Title	Album details	USA	JPN
A Good Day	Released: June 10, 2008; Label: Blue Note Records	147	51
When You Grow Up	Released: May 3, 2011; Label: Blue Note Records	-	-
Natural Colors	Released: June 27, 2012; Label: EMI Music Japan	-	186
Home ~ My Song Diary	Released: October 31, 2012; Label: EMI Music Japan	-	270
This Is Where We Are	Released: July 25, 2013; Label: SQE Music	-	238
Just Know That I Love You	Released: July 16, 2014; Label: Yamaha Music Communications	-	58
Priscilla Ahn Best	Released: July 23, 2014; Label: Universal Music	-	193
La La La	Released: Oct 28, 2016; Label: In a Tree Inc.	-	-

=== EPs ===
- Priscilla Ahn (2007, self-released)
- Live Session (2008, iTunes)
- In A Tree (2009)
- Sweet Hearts (2012, With Charlie Wadhams)
- Waiting (2021)

=== Singles ===
- "Dream" (2008, Blue Note)
- "I'll Never Smile Again" (2009)
- "I Am Strong" by Tiësto featuring vocals by Priscilla Ahn (2009)
- "Where The Leaf Starts To Fall" featuring Taiwanese music band Sodagreen (English) (2013)
- "從一片落葉開始" (Starting With a Fallen Leaf) by Sodagreen featuring vocals by Priscilla Ahn (Mandarin and English) from their 9th studio album Autumn: Stories (2013)

=== Music videos ===
- "Dream"
- "Red Cape"
- "Vibe So Hot"
- "I Don't Have Time To Love"
- "When You Grow Up"
- "Torch Song"
- "Home"
- "Remember How I Broke Your Heart"
- "Leave It Open"

=== Compilation appearances ===
- His Way, Our Way (Sinatra Tribute)
- The Hotel Café presents Winter Songs- Silent Night featured on ER

=== Contributions ===
- Vocals and Piano on Joshua Radin's We Were Here, Columbia, 2006 (as Priscilla Hartranft)
- Vocals on Amos Lee's Supply and Demand, Blue Note Records, 2006
- Vocals on Joshua Radin's EP Unclear Sky: "The Fear You Won't Fall", 2006
- Vocals on Joshua Radin's Underwater: "Let It Go", "The Greenest Grass", 2012.
- Vocals on William Fitzsimmons' The Sparrow and the Crow, Mercer Street, 2008
- Vocals on Cary Brothers' Vol. 1 EP Maps, 2012
- Vocals on Ashtar Command American Sunshine: "The Breakup Song", "Rosa", "All the Stars in Heaven", 2011
- Vocals on TV on the Radio's Nine Types of Light: "Will Do", 2011
- Vocals on Amos Lee's Mission Bell: "Stay With Me", 2011

== Filmography ==
Credits of Priscilla Ahn as a vocalist and/or songwriter

Year	Film	Recording Title	Notes
2009	Bride Wars	"Dream"	Twentieth Century Fox Film Corporation
	Loving Leah	"Dream"	Hallmark Hall of Fame
2010	My Sister's Keeper	"Find My Way Back Home"	Warner Bros. Pictures
	Brand New Day (f/k/a Traveling)	"Dream"	Universal City Studios Productions LLLP
	Legends of the Canyon	"Dream"	Impact film Sales LTD
	Free Willy: Escape from Pirate's Cove	"Find My Way Back Home"	Warner Bros. Pictures
2011	An Invisible Sign of My Own	"In a Tree"	Invisible Indelible
	Red Flag	"Find My Way Back Home"	Hands On Productions, Inc.
2012	Chasing Maverics		vocalist
2013	Missing Pieces	"Find My Way Back Home"	Contraction Entertainment
	The Goats	"Wallflower"	The Goats, LLC
	Pacific Rim	"Mako"	Warner Bros. Pictures & Legendary Pictures
2014	When Marnie Was There	"Fine on the Outside"	Studio Ghibli
	Moms' Night Out	"Dream"	Affirm Films
2016	La La Land		additional vocals
	American Pastoral (film)	"Moon River"	Lionsgate

=== Television ===
Credits of Priscilla Ahn as a vocalist and/or songwriter

- 2009: Men in Trees – Leave the Light On (Warner Bros. Television)
- 2009: Grey's Anatomy – Dream (ABC Studios)
- 2009: Psych – A Good Day (Morning Song) (NBC Studios, Inc.)
- 2009: Knight Rider-I Don't Think So (NBC Studios, Inc)
- 2009: Ghost Whisperer – Dream (ABC Studios)
- 2009: Eli Stone – Dream (ABC Studios)
- 2009: ER Promos – Silent Night (NBC Studios, Inc)
- 2010: Jeep Wrangler "We Build" – In a Tree (commercials – BBDO)
- 2010: So You Think You Can Dance – Dream (DanceNation Productions, Inc.)
- 2010: Life – Dream (NBC Universal Television)
- 2010: The Biggest Loser – Red Cape (BL4 Productions, Inc)
- 2010: Brothers And Sisters – Dream (ABC Studios)
- 2010: Grey's Anatomy – Christmas Time Is Here (American Broadcasting Company)
- 2010: Kansai Electric Power – Leave The Light On (EMI Music Japan)
- 2011: So You Think You Can Dance Season 7 – Dream (Dick Clark Productions, Inc.)
- 2011: Psych – Christmas Time Is Here (GEP)
- 2011: Kansai Electric Power – Leave The Light On (EMI Japan)
- 2011: "Married, Single, Other" BBC – Find My Way Back Home (EMI UK)
- 2011: "Married, Single, Other" ITV – Find My Way Back Home (EMI UK)
- 2012: ABC Family: Make It or Break It – Dream (ABC Studios)
- 2012: United States: In Plain Sight – Season 4 – Wallflower (NBC Universal Television Music)
- 2012: WB: Men in Trees (ET Upgrade) – Leave The Light On (Warner Bros. Television)
- 2012: RIS – Dream (EMI Music France)
- 2012: NHK: Soko wo Nantoka – I'll Be Here (EMI Music Japan)
- 2014: NHK: Soko wo Nantoka 2 – Best I can ベスト・アイ・キャン (Universal Music Japan)

==== Television appearances ====
- 2008: The Tonight Show with Jay Leno – (Ep. 16.107 – NBC Studios)
- 2008: The Late Late Show with Craig Ferguson – (Ep. 5.1 – CBS)
- 2009: Later with Jools Holland – (Ep. 34.4 – BBC)
- 2011: The Tonight Show with Jay Leno – (Ep. 19.140 – NBC Studios)
- 2011: Dancing with the Stars – (Ep. 12.13 – CBS)
