= Extreme Love: Dementia =

2012 film

- Directed by: Dan Child
- Starring: Louis Theroux
- Narrated by: Louis Theroux
- Country of origin: Phoenix Arizona
- Original language: English

Production
- Producer: Dan Child
- Running time: 60 minutes

Original release
- Release: 26 April 2012

Related
- Extreme Love: Autism; Twilight of the Porn Stars

Extreme Love: Dementia is a 2012 British documentary film by Louis Theroux.

The documentary is the second part of Theroux's Extreme Love, following Extreme Love: Autism.

Theroux travels to the city of Phoenix, Arizona, considered the capital of dementia care, spending time at Beatitudes, a residential institution for those with dementia. Theroux also meets individuals in the Phoenix area who are trying to keep relationships alive with loved ones with dementia as their disease progresses. Theroux also addresses the case of Early-onset Alzheimer's, presenting the case of Selinda Hope Border, a 49-year-old mother who had been diagnosed with dementia. Selinda died on 24 January 2018 at the age of 56 as a result of such illness.
