= A Love Extreme =

Studio album by Benji Hughes
- Released: July 22, 2008
- Genre: Rock, pop
- Length: 1:08:08
- Label: New West
- Producer: Keefus Ciancia, David Susskind, Gus Seyffert

Benji Hughes chronology
A Love Extreme (2008)	Songs in the Key of Animals (2016)

Professional ratings
Aggregate scores
Source	Rating
Metacritic	68/100
Review scores
Source	Rating
AllMusic	3.5/5 stars

A Love Extreme is the first studio album by the American musician Benji Hughes. It was released on July 22, 2008, with Keefus Ciancia, David Susskind and Gus Seyffert producing. The album was recorded at The Green Room Studios in Los Feliz, California and Sargent Studios in Echo Park, California. The album was released on compact disc and on 180-gram vinyl pressing by New West Records.

== Track listing ==
All tracks by Keith Ciancia & Benji Hughes except where noted

Disc one
No.	Title	Length
1.	"I Am You, You Are Me, We Are One" (Fred Karlin cover)	1:20
2.	"Tight Tee Shirt"	2:49
3.	"You Stood Me Up"	3:32
4.	"Neighbor Down the Hall"	2:35
5.	"Waiting for an Invitation"	4:15
6.	"Cornfields"	1:13
7.	"Why Do These Parties Always End the Same Way?"	3:44
8.	"Where Do Old Lovers Go?"	4:22
9.	"Do You Think They Would Tell You?"	3:34
10.	"All You've Got to Do Is Fall in Love"	2:13
11.	"Mmmmmmm"	0:37

Disc two
No.	Title	Length
1.	"Even If"	3:28
2.	"Girl in the Tower"	2:57
3.	"Vibe So Hot"	2:07
4.	"So Well"	3:02
5.	"The Mummy"	1:38
6.	"Love Is a Razor"	3:17
7.	"I Went with Some Friends to See the Flaming Lips"	2:12
8.	"Coyotes"	2:21
9.	"Ladies on Parade"	3:02
10.	"Jubalee"	3:06
11.	"So Much Better"	3:11
12.	"Love on a Budget"	2:59
13.	"Lyegue"	0:37
14.	"Baby, It's Your Life!"	3:57

== Personnel ==
Benji Hughes and Keefus Ciancia, all performed music except:

- Gus Seyffert – bass on Disc 1, tracks 5, 7, and 10; Disc 2, tracks 3, 5, 6, 7, 10, 11; drums and vocals on Disc 2, track 5; drums Disc 2, track 10
- Jonathan Wilson – guitar on Disc 2, track 3
- Bobby Gruska – drums on Disc 2, tracks 3 and 14
- Bram Inscore – keyboards on Disc 2, track 6
- Jade Vincent – vocals on Disc 1, track 9
- Joey Waronker – drums on Disc 1, tracks 2, 3, 5 and 10
- Mike Andrews – guitar on Disc 1, tracks 5 and 10
- Morgan Nagler – vocals on Disc 1, track 8 and Disc 2, track 14
- Jay Bellerose – drums on Disc 2, tracks 7 and 11
- Aaron Robinson – acoustic guitar on Disc 2, track 6
