= Étienne Daho =

French singer (born 1956)

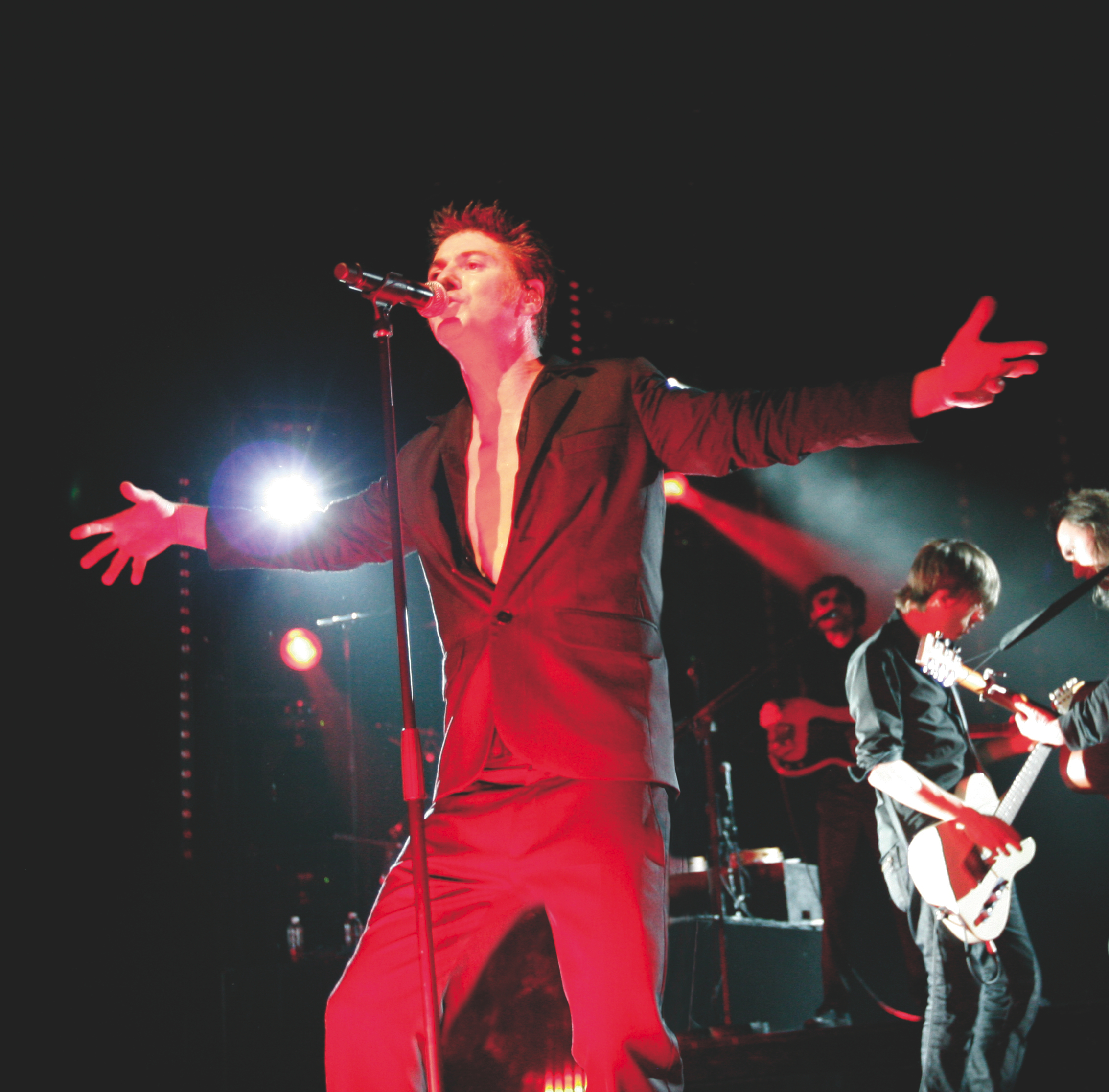
- Daho at the Olympia, Paris in 2008

Background information
- Born: Étienne Daho; 14 January 1956 (age 70); Oran, French Algeria (current-day Algeria)
- Origin: France
- Genres: Chanson, French pop, new wave
- Occupations: Singer, songwriter
- Years active: 1980s–present
- Labels: Virgin, Capitol
- Website: etiennedaho.com

Étienne Daho (/daʊ/; French: [etjɛn dao]; born 14 January 1956) is a French singer-songwriter. He has released a number of synth-driven and rock-surf influenced pop hit singles since 1981.

== Career ==
Daho was born in Oran, French Algeria. He sings in a low, whispery voice somewhat akin to Leonard Cohen or Chet Baker and his music established him as a pop cult hero. He cites Serge Gainsbourg, The Velvet Underground, The Beach Boys and Syd Barrett as his musical influences. All his albums have been certified at least gold or platinum, including "Mythomane" in 1981, "La notte, la notte" in 1984, "Pop satori" in 1986, produced with a young William Orbit, "Pour nos vies martiennes" in 1988 and the double platinum "Paris ailleurs" in 1991, recorded in New York.

A best-selling recording artist in his own right in France, Daho is best known in Britain for his appearance on the number 11 Saint Etienne hit single "He's on the Phone", which is an English-language adaptation of his 1984 French-language big hit "Weekend à Rome". He also collaborated with Saint Etienne on the Reserection EP, his album Eden, and his single hit Le Premier Jour.

Daho's collaborations and productions both on stage and in the studio with other artists have been extensive. He has worked with Brigitte Fontaine, Arthur Baker, Air, Working Week, '80's new wave bands OMD and Comateens, Jane Birkin, Marianne Faithfull, Françoise Hardy, Charlotte Gainsbourg, Vanessa Paradis, Dani and more. His music has also been remixed, among others, by Air, Fischerspooner, Amon Tobin and William Orbit.

Daho's 1996 album Eden displayed a diverse array of electronic-oriented songs that included downtempo ballads, drum and bass-influenced tracks, and Hi-NRG dance. He duetted with Astrud Gilberto ("Les bords de Seine") and was accompanied by The Swingle Singers on "Timide intimité". Backing vocals on several songs were provided by Lyn Byrd of the Comateens, Sarah Cracknell (who co-wrote "Les passagers"), and Elli Medeiros.

Eden was subsequently re-released for the anglophone market with great reviews with the song "A New World", which was an English-language version of "Au Commencement". Daho performed in a sold out Institute of Contemporary Arts. He also sang at the Marquee in 1989.

After a double platinum greatest hits compilation Best of Singles in 1998, the number one Corps & armes in 2000 saw Daho eschewing electronics in favour of a more orchestral sound fuelled by traditional instruments: piano, acoustic guitar, horns, directed by Wil Malone. One of the tracks included an English-language duet with Vanessa Daou ("Make Believe"). It includes also "Le brasier", "La baie" and "Ouverture".

Daho shifted gears once again for his dark and moody 2004 album Réévolution, which featured a guitar-heavy rock sound. He released the single hit "If" with Charlotte Gainsbourg as well as the Phil Spector influenced "Retour à toi" and "Les liens d'Eros" with Marianne Faithfull, reading her great-uncle Leopold von Sacher-Masoch's Venus in furs.

In 2005, Daho released a live album Sortir Ce Soir, which featured many of his greatest hits performed in concert.

In 2007, his new album, L'Invitation, which was created with Edith Fambuena, was released to good press reviews. In 2008, a compilation of covers was released, called Tombés pour Daho (after Daho's single, Tombé pour la France). The recording artists include Benjamin Biolay, Doriand, Elli Medeiros, Daniel Darc, and Arnold Turboust. In the same year, on 8 March, Daho received a Victoire de la Musique award in the category Album Pop / Rock of the Year.

Les Chansons de l'innocence retrouvée was released in 2013 and was a critical success in France, being included in several best end-of-year lists, including Les Inrockuptibles and Télérama.

For record sleeves and music videos, Daho has collaborated with Pierre et Gilles, Michel Gondry, Nick Knight, Doug Nichol, Jean-Pierre Jeunet, M/M, Abake, Inez van Lamsweerde and Guy Peellaert among others.

In 2016, Daho was invited by John Cale to sing "I'll Be Your Mirror" at the 50th anniversary celebration of The Velvet Underground and Nico at the Philharmonie de Paris.

== Translations and covers ==
- Daho re-recorded the song "Au Commencement" in English as "A New World" for the Anglophone market.
- In the '90s, dance mixes by remixers such as William Orbit were released of some of Daho's '80s singles, such as "Épaule Tattoo".
- Spanish singer Luz Casal recorded a cover version of "Duel au soleil" in Spanish called "Un Nuevo Dia Brillara".
- Saint Etienne's single "He's on the Phone" is heavily based on Daho's "Week-end à Rome". Daho also collaborated with the band on several other songs.
- Daho also recorded a cover of "My Girl Has Gone", a 1965 hit originally written and recorded by The Miracles.
- A fan of Pink Floyd, Daho has recorded versions of "Arnold Layne" and "Cirrus Minor".
- Nouvelle Vague recorded a cover version of "Week-end à Rome" with Vanessa Paradis.
- Daho's 1998 single "Le Premier Jour du reste de ta vie" is an adaptation of Sarah Cracknell (Saint Etienne's lead singer)'s "Ready or Not" from her first solo album Lipslide (1997).

== Discography ==
=== Albums ===
(All albums until 2003 under Virgin Records, from 2005 onwards, on Capitol Records )

- 1981: Mythomane
- 1984: La notte, la notte
- 1985: Tombé pour la France (mini album)
- 1986: Pop satori
- 1988: Pour nos vies martiennes
- 1989: Live ED
- 1991: Paris ailleurs
- 1993: DahOlympia
- 1995: Réserection (EP with St. Etienne)
- 1996: Eden
- 1998: Singles
- 2000: Corps & armes
- 2001: Daho Live
- 2002: Dans la peau de Daho (long box)
- 2003: Réévolution
- 2005: Sortir ce soir (best of live)
- 2006: Pop satori Deluxe (boxset)
- 2007: L'invitation
- 2009: Daho Pleyel Paris (Live)
- 2010: Le Condamné à mort (with Jeanne Moreau)
- 2013: Les chansons de l'innocence retrouvée
- 2014: Diskönoir
- 2015: L'homme qui marche
- 2017: Blitz
- 2023: Tirer la nuit sur les étoiles

=== Videos ===
- 1986: Une Nuit Satori à l'Olympia – VHS – Virgin
- 1991: Paris Ailleurs – VHS – Virgin
- 1993: Daholympia – VHS – Virgin
- 1998: Intégrale des Clips – VHS/DVD – Virgin
- 2001: Daho Live – VHS/DVD – Virgin
- 2005: Sortir Ce Soir – DVD – Capitol – Dvd de platine
- 2008: An Evening with Daho – DVD – Capitol
- 2009: Daho Pleyel Paris – DVD – Capitol
- 2015: Etienne Daho KOKO Theater of London – Arte TV

== Honours ==
- Knight of the Legion of Honour (2025)
- Officer of the Ordre national du Mérite (2011)
- Commander of the Ordre des Arts et des Lettres (2022)

== Bibliography ==
- Frédérique Veysset, Daho dans tous ses états, Les Humanoïdes associés, 1989
- Eric Chemouny et Pierre Fageolle, Étienne Daho, Presses de la Cité, 2001
- David Sanson, Étienne Daho de A à Z, Express Prelude & Fugue, 2002
- Antoine Giacomoni, Daho par Giacomoni, The mirror sessions parties photographies, Horizons illimités, 2004
- Carole Vernier " Sensibilité et passion" Éd. Rouchon, 2006
- Aurélie Christa, " Du passé compliqué au présent simple", Éd. Thélès, 2007
- Benoît Cachin " Portraits et entretiens" Éd. Tournon, 2007
- Christophe Conte " Une histoire d'Etienne Daho" Éd. Flammarion/ Pop culture, 2008
- Benoît Cachin, Dahodisco, Éd. Gründ, 2013
- Alfred et David Chauvel, L'Homme Qui Chante, Éd. Delcourt 2015
