= Sleeping Tapes =

Studio album by Jeff Bridges
- Released: January 29, 2015
- Recorded: Playback Studios, Santa Barbara, California
- Genre: Spoken word, ambient
- Length: 43:13

Jeff Bridges chronology
Jeff Bridges (2011)	Sleeping Tapes (2015)

Sleeping Tapes is a 2015 spoken word/ambient album by actor Jeff Bridges, with music by Keefus Ciancia.

The album was released by web hosting service Squarespace as part of its 2015 Super Bowl advertising campaign, with all proceeds from album sales going to Share Our Strength's No Kid Hungry campaign.

== Reception ==
Professional ratings
Review scores
Source	Rating
Consequence of Sound	B−
Pitchfork	7.8/10

Pitchfork gave the album 7.8 out of a possible 10, noting, "Way beyond sleep aids, you get the sense that Bridges would be a hell of a life coach."

== Track listing ==
Sleeping Tapes track listing
No.	Title	Length
1.	"Introduction (Good Evening)"	2:14
2.	"Sleep. Dream. Wakeup."	2:09
3.	"Chimes for Dreams"	1:25
4.	"Hummmmmm"	2:53
5.	"Goodmorning, Sweetheart"	1:30
6.	"See You at the Dreaming Tree"	3:06
7.	"A Glass of Water"	0:54
8.	"The Raven"	0:55
9.	"The Hen"	1:06
10.	"Ikea"	1:03
11.	"The Sea"	2:25
12.	"Temescal Canyon"	11:04
13.	"Feeling Good"	3:27
14.	"Seeing With My Eyes Closed"	5:18
15.	"Goodnight (We're All in This Together)"	3:44
