= Benji Hughes =

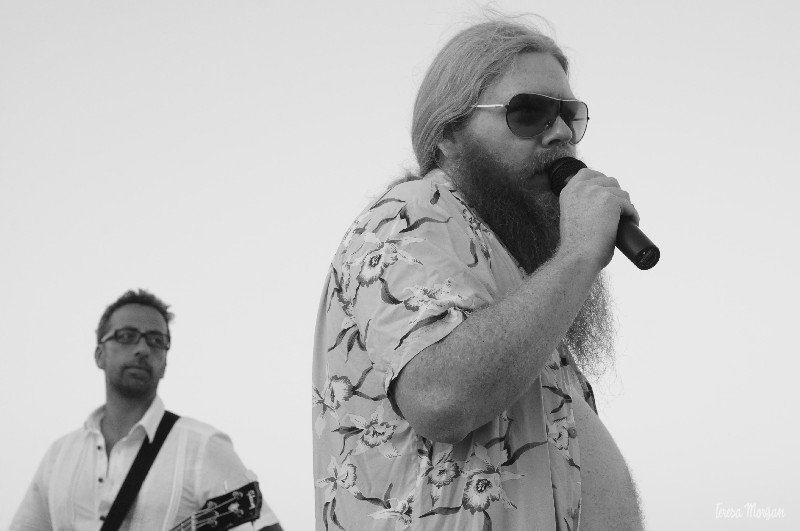
- Official New West Records Photo

Background information
- Origin: Charlotte, North Carolina, United States
- Genres: Rock, pop
- Labels: New West, Merge
- Website: www.benjihughesmusic.com

Benji Hughes is an American musical artist from Charlotte, North Carolina. His first album, A Love Extreme, was released in 2008.

== A Love Extreme ==
On July 22, 2008, Benji Hughes released his debut album, entitled A Love Extreme on New West Records. A Love Extreme is a double-disc album containing 25 songs. It was recorded with producer and Los Angeles session musician Keefus Ciancia. Hughes' live band during this period contained a rotating cast of members, including Barbara Gruska (of Jenny Lewis and The Belle Brigade) on drums; two of Hughes' former Muscadine bandmates; solo-artist and producer Jonathan Wilson on guitar and backing vocals, and Stacy Leazer on bass and backing vocals; Ciancia on keyboards; solo artist and producer Jon Lindsay on keyboards and vocals, and veteran Charlotte musicians Peter Gray (guitar) and David Kim (drums), among others. The album received favorable reviews from some prominent critics, including Jon Pareles of The New York Times and Chuck Klosterman of Esquire, but it sold few copies.

== Other work ==
Hughes has had several songs featured in television shows, including Beverly Hills, 90210, Chuck, How I Met Your Mother and Eastbound & Down (the song, "Kenny", was released as a single on April 12, 2012). Hughes was also a contributing songwriter for the 2007 film Walk Hard: The Dewey Cox Story.

Hughes made a cameo appearance in the 2009 film Gentlemen Broncos as Benjamin Purvis' father, only ever depicted in a photograph.

In 2011 Hughes appeared on Jeff Bridges's self-titled country album. He also appeared on Meshell Ndegeocello's album Weather, contributing vocals on two songs and receiving writing credit on three.

Hughes released four new albums via his website in November 2014. XXOXOXX, Songs in the Key of Animals, and OXOXOXOXOX are bundled as a set on 4 CDs or a flash drive. LILILIL is a children's concept album set in outer space available as a separate purchase on Compact Disc only. XXOXOXX and OXOXOXOXOX were later re-released under the names Another Extreme and A Lover's Extreme (not to be confused with 2008's A Love Extreme) respectively on May 8, 2020.

In August 2015, it was announced that Hughes signed to Merge Records and would release a new full-length album in 2016. The album, Songs in the Key of Animals, was released in 2016.

On May 8, 2020, alongside re-releases of XXOXOXX and OXOXOXOXOX, Hughes released "Spirit Guide", a 47-minute long single.

== Reception ==
Hughes' work has received critical praise. Los Angeles Times critic Mikael Wood called him "something of a cult hero thanks to his brilliant and demented pop records." A 2009 profile of Hughes in The Believer called Hughes "one of the best pop songwriters in America, a musical autodidact and a heavy-hearted leonine balladeer whose confessions from the world off 277 will break your heart." A lengthy 2014 profile by New York music critic Jody Rosen commented that Hughes's extensive following among other musicians and other celebrities was such that "[h]e may have as many famous admirers as civilian ones", and praised his songs for "the way they toss together zingy pop-culture references and traditionalist songcraft; their blend of hepcat shagginess and poetic precision; and especially the mix of wry and lavishly romantic, of tongue-in-cheek and heart-on-sleeve."

== Discography ==
=== Studio albums ===
- A Love Extreme (2008)
- OXOXOXOXOX (renamed A Lover's Extreme for 2020 reissue) (2014)
- XXOXOXX (renamed Another Extreme for 2020 reissue) (2014)
- LILILIL (2014)
- Songs in the Key of Animals (2016)

=== Singles ===
- "Spirit Guide" (2020)
