= A Good Day (Priscilla Ahn album) =

Studio album by Priscilla Ahn
- Released: June 10, 2008
- Recorded: 2008
- Genres: Acoustic, folk
- Label: Blue Note
- Producer: Joey Waronker

Priscilla Ahn chronology
A Good Day (2008)	When You Grow Up (2011)

Professional ratings
Review scores
Source	Rating
Allmusic	4/5 stars
Planet Sound	5/10

A Good Day is the major label debut album by American singer–songwriter Priscilla Ahn. The album was released June 10, 2008 on Blue Note Records.

== Track listing ==
All songs written by Priscilla Ahn except where noted.

1. "Dream" – 3:32
2. "Wallflower" – 3:00
3. "I Don't Think So" – 2:18
4. "Masters in China" (Benji Hughes) – 3:20
5. "Leave the Light On" – 3:15
6. "Red Cape" – 2:55
7. "Astronaut" (G. Seyffert, Priscilla Ahn) – 3:32
8. "Lullaby" – 4:44
9. "Find My Way Back Home" – 2:26
10. "Opportunity To Cry" (Willie Nelson) – 3:26
11. "A Good Day (Morning Song)" – 3:24

iTunes bonus track

12. "We Were Free" – 2:42

Japan bonus track

12. "Moonbeam Song" (Harry Nilson) – 3:36

Vinyl bonus tracks

12. "In A Tree" – 2:30
13. "We Were Free" – 2:42
14. "Mine Is Fine" – 2:17
