= Living in the Future's Past =

- Directed by: Susan Kucera
- Produced by: Jeff Bridges; Jim Swift; Susan Kucera
- Production company: Rangeland Productions
- Distributed by: Vision Films
- Release date: October 5, 2018 (United States)
- Running time: 84 minutes
- Country: United States
- Language: English

Living in the Future's Past is a 2018 American documentary film directed by Susan Kucera, and produced and narrated by Jeff Bridges. The film features Bridges and several scientists and intellectuals discussing how biology, physics, economics, and politics have contributed to the ongoing crises such as climate change and resource depletion. The film features interviews with Bruce Hood, Wesley Clark, Daniel Goleman, Bob Inglis, Oren Lyons, Leonard Mlodinow, Timothy Morton, Mark Plotkin, Ian Robertson, Piers Sellers, and others.

== Reception ==
The Los Angeles Times praised the film for avoiding scare tactics and instead providing a sobering account of climate change saying "While the outlook often seems bleak, the message is to take the future into our own hands — to change our behavior and change the world." The Hollywood Reporter criticized the execution as "glossed-up and edited for viewers with ADHD" but said the filmmakers had "good intentions." Film Threat gave the film 5.5/10 and said the film was like "something that could have been commissioned for a science museum or an edutainment IMAX feature."

=== Awards ===
- UNDPI Gold Award for Outstanding Achievement in International Communications which best exemplifies the ideals and goals of the United Nations from the United Nations
- Gold World Medal for Climate Change and Sustainability from the United Nations
- Best Documentary Award from the Garden State Film Festival
