= Extreme Love: Autism =

2012 British documentary

- Directed by: Jamie Pickup
- Starring: Louis Theroux
- Narrated by: Louis Theroux
- Country of origin: United Kingdom
- Original language: English

Production
- Executive producer: Nick Mirsky
- Producer: Jamie Pickup
- Editor: Anne Price
- Running time: 60 minutes
- Production company: BBC Productions

Original release
- Release: 19 April 2012

Related
- Louis Theroux: America's Most Dangerous Pets; Extreme Love: Dementia

Extreme Love: Autism is a 2012 British documentary film by Louis Theroux.

The documentary is the first part of Theroux's Extreme Love and is followed by Extreme Love: Dementia.

Theroux visits the DLC Warren school in New Jersey, one of the best schools in the United States for autism. There he meets the students and their families to get a glimpse of what life is like for them, and to experience the pleasures and the challenges faced by autistic children.
