= Almost Lover =

Single by A Fine Frenzy

from the album One Cell in the Sea
- Released: May 22, 2007
- Genre: Piano pop; adult alternative
- Length: 4:30
- Label: Virgin
- Songwriter: Alison Sudol
- Producers: Hal Cragin; Lukas Burton

A Fine Frenzy singles chronology
"Lifesize" (2007)	"Almost Lover" (2007)	"Come On, Come Out" (2008)

"Almost Lover" is a song written and recorded by A Fine Frenzy, the stage name of American singer-songwriter Alison Sudol. It was released May 22, 2007 through Virgin Records as the second single from her debut studio album, One Cell in the Sea (2007). The single failed to enter the US Billboard Hot 100, but experienced success in Europe, reaching the top 10 in the singles charts of Austria, Germany, and Switzerland.

== Composition ==
"Almost Lover" is a piano-driven pop ballad with elements of alternative rock written and composed by Alison Sudol. According to the digital sheet music published at Musicnotes.com by Alfred Publishing Co., Inc., the song was originally composed in the key of A minor and set in common time to a slow tempo of 63 BPM, with a vocal range spanning from G_{3} through C_{5}.

== Critical reception ==
Susan Visakowitz of Billboard wrote that, although Sudol "tackles a well-worn subject" on the song, "she does so with poetic turns of phrase and a lovely, unassuming vocal" that result in "Almost Lover" creating a "lasting first impression." In a review of One Cell in the Sea, Shirley Halperin of Entertainment Weekly wrote that "attention to the dramatic works wonders" on "Almost Lover" by showcasing Sudol's vocals.

== Formats and track listings ==
Digital download – single
No.	Title	Writer(s)	Length
1.	"Almost Lover"	Alison Sudol	4:30

2008 CD single
No.	Title	Writer(s)	Length
1.	"Almost Lover" (radio edit)	Alison Sudol	4:17

2008 CD maxi single
No.	Title	Writer(s)	Length
1.	"Almost Lover" (radio edit)	Alison Sudol	4:17
2.	"Almost Lover" (instrumental)	Sudol	4:33
3.	"Whisper"	Sudol; Lukas Burton	4:56
Total length:			13:46

2009 CD single
No.	Title	Writer(s)	Length
1.	"Almost Lover" (radio mix)	Alison Sudol	3:38
2.	"Almost Lover" (remix)	Sudol	3:57
3.	"Almost Lover" (radio edit)	Sudol	4:17
4.	"Almost Lover" (instrumental)	Sudol	4:33
5.	"Whisper"	Sudol; Burton	4:56
Total length:			21:21

== Versions ==
1. "Almost Lover" (Album version)
2. "Almost Lover" (2nd Version)
3. "Almost Lover" (Radio Edit)
4. "Almost Lover" (Radio Mix)
5. "Almost Lover" (Video Mix)
6. "Almost Lover" (Instrumental)
7. "Almost Lover" (Eric Ivan Rosse Remix)

== Music video ==
There are two music videos made for the single. The first one was directed by Laurent Briet, and sees A Fine Frenzy playing a piano in the forest, sitting in the middle of a stream. Suddenly rocks start to fly up to the sky. Later, it can be seen that parts of the piano start to detach from each other. The second video was directed by the Nee Brothers. In this version, A Fine Frenzy is behind glass doors. She plays a dirty piano as she recalls her almost lover from the past. Flashbacks can be seen of the pair on the beach. The video was later edited to feature a revised "domestic remix" of the song.

Chloe Lukasiak, a 13-year-old dancer from the television show Dance Moms, filmed a solo dance video to Almost Lover, using a cover version recorded by Jasmine Thompson in 2013. The video was directed by Director Brazil and choreographed by Brittany Pent, and it has over 3 million views (as of 2017).

== Usage in popular culture ==
"Almost Lover" was featured on a season three episode of American reality television series, The Hills titled, "A Night at the Opera" and a season four episode of American legal comedy-drama, Suits titled, "Fork in the Road". Rolling Stone listed the Hills feature as one of the series' 15 best musical moments. The song was also used as the backing music for a performance by Courtney Galiano on season four of American reality competition program, So You Think You Can Dance, and for performances by Lisa Auguste and Corynne Barron on the first and second seasons, respectively, of the Canadian counterpart, So You Think You Can Dance Canada.

== Charts and certifications ==
=== Weekly charts ===
Chart (2007–08)	Peak position
Austria (Ö3 Austria Top 40)	5
Czech Republic Airplay (ČNS IFPI)	35
Germany (GfK)	8
Germany Airplay (BVMI)	4
Switzerland (Schweizer Hitparade)	10
US Bubbling Under Hot 100 (Billboard)	9
US Adult Contemporary (Billboard)	23
US Digital Song Sales (Billboard)	62

=== Year-end charts ===
Chart (2008)	Position
Austria (Ö3 Austria Top 40)	20
Germany (Official German Charts)	28
Switzerland (Schweizer Hitparade)	27

=== Certifications ===
Region	Certification	Certified units/sales
Germany (BVMI)	Gold	150,000^{^}
Switzerland (IFPI Switzerland)	Gold	15,000^{^}
^{^} Shipments figures based on certification alone.

== Release history ==
Country	Date	Format	Label	Catalog No.	Ref.
Worldwide	May 22, 2007	Digital download	Virgin	—N/a	
United States	August 20, 2007	Hot Adult Contemporary Radio	Virgin	—N/a	
Europe	January 11, 2008	Maxi single	Capitol	5198502	
Europe	March 7, 2008	CD single	Virgin	2087332; 2087352	
United States	January 20, 2009	CD single	Virgin		
