= Bomb in a Birdcage =

Studio album by A Fine Frenzy
- Released: August 28, 2009
- Length: 46:34
- Label: Virgin

A Fine Frenzy chronology
One Cell in the Sea (2007)	Bomb in a Birdcage (2009)	Pines (2012)

Singles from Bomb in a Birdcage
- 1. "Blow Away" Released: July 17, 2009; 2. "Happier" Released: February 2, 2010; 3. "Electric Twist" Released: April 6, 2010

Professional ratings
Review scores
Source	Rating
AllMusic	4/5 stars

Bomb in a Birdcage is the second studio album by A Fine Frenzy, the stage name of American singer-songwriter Alison Sudol. The album was released on August 28, 2009 in Germany and on September 8, 2009 in the United States.

== Background and release ==
Bomb in a Birdcage debuted at #28 on the US Billboard 200, a career high for Sudol. The album's singles were digitally released via iTunes: "Blow Away" in July 2009, followed by "Happier" and "Electric Twist" in 2010. Two bonus tracks were also included with exclusive editions of the album on iTunes and Amazon MP3 respectively: "Coming Around" and "Silent War". The album's title is taken from the end of the LP's first song, "What I Wouldn't Do", where Sudol sings: "It was now and we were both in the same place / Didn't know how to say the words / With my heart ticking like a bomb in a birdcage / I left before someone got hurt." In an iTunes podcast about "The World Without," Sudol revealed that she felt Bomb in a Birdcage is about "two totally messed up people trying to stay afloat despite all the odds."

== Critical reception ==
Bomb in a Birdcage received generally positive reviews, with most reviewers praising Sudol's songwriting but divided on Sudol's success at broadening her musical horizons beyond One Cell in the Sea. Kerri Mason of Billboard gave the album a favorable review. Mason was impressed with Sudol's musical growth, noting that she "builds on the more ethereal qualities" of One Cell in the Sea, concluding that Bomb in a Birdcage "shows there's much more up [Sudol's] billowy sleeve." Andrew Leahey of AllMusic gave the album four of five stars, calling it "a lively piece of work" and concluded that Bomb in a Birdcage is "a fitting display of the explosives this songbird now has in her arsenal." Mackenzie Wilson of Bust magazine noted that "simple pop moments such as "What I Wouldn't Do" and "Happier" showcase [Sudol's] songwriting chops as well as her artistic confidence." Matthew Tsai of Decoy Music was less impressed with the album, giving it three stars, but noted that "overall, the album sheds a joyful radiance" and conceded, "it may be intricate, but it is undoubtedly not forgettable." James Shotwell of Under the Gun Review called the album "beautiful and moving" and praised Sudol's ability to "[walk] the fine line between simplistic and lush." On mxdwn.com, Charlee Redman called Bomb in a Birdcage "pretty pop with an edge" and "a pleasant listen, and maybe a sign of new directions to come."

== Track listing ==
No.	Title	Writer(s)	Length
1.	"What I Wouldn't Do"	Alison Sudol	2:57
2.	"New Heights"	Sudol, Jesse Siebenberg	4:12
3.	"Electric Twist"	Sudol	4:31
4.	"Blow Away"	Sudol, Lukas Burton	4:09
5.	"Happier"	Sudol, Burton	3:30
6.	"Swan Song"	Sudol	3:43
7.	"Elements"	Sudol	3:24
8.	"The World Without"	Sudol, Burton	4:15
9.	"Bird of the Summer"	Sudol	3:18
10.	"Stood Up"	Sudol, Burton	4:48
11.	"The Beacon"	Sudol	3:22

Amazon Music bonus track
No.	Title	Writer(s)	Length
12.	"Silent War"	Sudol	4:25

iTunes bonus track
No.	Title	Writer(s)	Length
13.	"Coming Around"	Sudol	4:23

== Charts ==
Chart performance for Bomb in a Birdcage
Chart (2009)	Peak position
Austrian Albums (Ö3 Austria)	35
Canadian Albums (Nielsen SoundScan)	80
German Albums (Offizielle Top 100)	33
Swiss Albums (Schweizer Hitparade)	15
US Billboard 200	28
US Top Rock Albums (Billboard)	10
