= One Cell in the Sea =

Studio album by A Fine Frenzy
- Released: July 17, 2007
- Genres: Indie rock; adult alternative
- Length: 61:44
- Label: Virgin
- Producers: Lukas Burton, Hal Cragin

A Fine Frenzy chronology
One Cell in the Sea (2007)	Bomb in a Birdcage (2009)

Singles from One Cell in the Sea
- 1. "Lifesize" Released: April 3, 2007; 2. "Almost Lover" Released: May 22, 2007; 3. "Come On, Come Out" Released: April 29, 2008

Alternative cover
- International version

One Cell in the Sea is the debut studio album by A Fine Frenzy, the stage name of American singer-songwriter Alison Sudol, released under Virgin Records on July 17, 2007. The album debuted at #158 on the Billboard 200 and later peaked at #91.

== Development ==
Sudol made a demo tape consisting of songs on One Cell in the Sea, which eventually fell into the hands of the CEO of Virgin Records. After listening to the tape, the CEO flew to Sudol's mother's home in Los Angeles to listen to her play. According to Sudol, he responded most positively to "Rangers," a track she considers "obscure and weird," so she found the label to be understanding.

The album title comes from a lyric in "The Minnow and the Trout" because Sudol felt the phrase "summed up everything." During a March 2008 interview with The Ledger, she stated the following of the title:

It's the beginning of something, it's the loneliness that I felt when I was making this album, because a lot of the writing of it was done late at night when everyone else was out doing their own thing. I wouldn't have wanted to be out, but it was a feeling of everybody being someone else, and you're lonely. And also it's the unity that we all have from basic human emotions and we all came from somewhere, so we're all connected. And that's how I tied everything together.

== Promotion ==
=== Singles ===
"Lifesize" was released as the lead single from One Cell in the Sea on April 3, 2007 via iTunes. The second single was "Almost Lover", released on May 22. In the United States, the song reached peak positions of #23 on Billboard's Hot Adult Contemporary Tracks chart, #62 on the Hot Digital Songs chart, #76 on the Pop 100 chart, and #9 on the Bubbling Under Hot 100 Singles chart. The single peaked at #5 in Austria, #8 in Germany, and #10 in Switzerland. Two music videos were created for the song. The first video, directed by Laurent Briet, shows Sudol playing a piano in the forest, sitting in the middle of a stream. Later, rocks start to fly up into the sky, and viewers see parts of the piano detach from each other. In the second video, which was directed by the Nee Brothers, viewers see Sudol behind glass doors, with Sudol playing a dirty piano as she recalls her 'almost lover' from the past. The video was later edited to fit a new video mix ("Almost Lover Remix Domestic"). "Come On, Come Out" was released as third single on April 29, 2008.

Other songs

The music video for "Rangers," directed by Caitlin Dahl, features Sudol playing the piano in a natural setting along with shots of her and a lover gathering stuffed animals while avoiding being seen by an older man that follows the couple. "You Picked Me" was featured on iTunes as the "Free Single of the Week" for August 14, 2007, and VH1 featured Sudol as one of their "You Oughta Know" artists.

=== Tour ===
Following the release of their album, A Fine Frenzy toured with Sean Lennon and Rufus Wainwright during late–July and early–August 2007, mostly along the West Coast. During August 9–31, the band opened for Wainwright throughout the South, New England, Midwest, and Canada. A Fine Frenzy then joined fellow Washington native Brandi Carlile for VH1's "You Oughta Know" tour, featuring acts that the channel previously has deemed "You Oughta Know" artists. On February 6, 2008, Sudol performed "Come On, Come Out" on Late Show with David Letterman. Following an appearance on CBS' The Early Show on February 23, 2008 to perform "Almost Lover" and "Come On, Come Out", Sudol headlined her own tour in the U.S. and Canada throughout March and early–April, and toured France, Belgium, the Netherlands, Germany, Switzerland, and the United Kingdom during the rest of the month. The band returned to Germany, Switzerland, and Austria on a headline tour in November 2008.

== Reception ==
Professional ratings
Review scores
Source	Rating
AbsolutePunk.net	(77%)
Allmusic	3/5 stars
Entertainment Weekly	(B)
Paste	(favorable)
The Phoenix	2/4 stars

Overall, reception of One Cell in the Sea was positive. In her review for Entertainment Weekly, Shirley Halperin wrote that Sudol conjured up a "musical wonderland" in creating the album, describing it as a "colorful world of bemusement and sentimentality". Halperin calls the songs presented "breathless", complimenting those where Sudol's voice takes center stage, such as "Almost Lover". Paste's David Mead described the album as pretty and mysterious enough to draw plenty of admirers, but that Sudol's work stands out among her peers with its "completely ingenuous correlations between love and nature in her lyrics". Music on the album has been compared to Coldplay, Tori Amos and Rufus Wainwright.

However, the album did receive some criticism. Mikael Wood of The Phoenix compliments "You Picked Me", but claims the rest of the album "bogs down in a minor-key rut that's the opposite of a frenzy". USA Today's Elysa Gardner wrote that One Cell in the Sea had some compelling moments, citing "The Minnow and the Trout" as a track readers should download, but admitted that Sudol needs to develop her songcraft if she wants to be "more than another quirky 'it' girl". In her review for Allmusic, Marisa Brown characterized Sudol as a decent lyricist, but believes the "heavily affected piano, the guitars and strings, force a kind of poignancy into the songs that ruins any kind of actual power they might have". Furthermore, Brown considers the album "boring, with melodies that go nowhere", claiming the choruses and verses blend into one another. Brown concluded: "She certainly tries hard, and nothing ever comes out awfully, but she never takes off, never does anything memorable, and so despite her attempts, A Fine Frenzy ends up being unremarkably dull."

== Chart performance ==
One Cell in the Sea peaked at #91 on the Billboard 200 on October 20, 2007, and A Fine Frenzy reached #1 on Billboard's Top Heatseekers chart. The album reached peak positions of #6 in Austria, #20 in Germany, and #11 in Switzerland. In the United States, "Almost Lover" reached #23 on the Hot Adult Contemporary Tracks chart, #62 on the Hot Digital Songs chart, #76 on the Pop 100 chart, and #9 on the Bubbling Under Hot 100 Singles chart. The single peaked at #5 in Austria, #8 in Germany, and #10 in Switzerland.

== Track listing ==
No.	Title	Writer(s)	Length
1.	"Come On, Come Out"	Alison Sudol, Hal Cragin, Lukas Burton	3:35
2.	"The Minnow & the Trout"	Sudol	4:28
3.	"Whisper"	Sudol, Cragin, Burton	4:56
4.	"You Picked Me"	Sudol	4:23
5.	"Rangers"	Sudol, Cragin, Burton	4:33
6.	"Almost Lover"	Sudol	4:28
7.	"Think of You"	Sudol	4:06
8.	"Ashes and Wine"	Sudol, Cragin, Burton	4:20
9.	"Liar, Liar"	Sudol	5:55
10.	"Last of Days"	Sudol	4:12
11.	"Lifesize"	Sudol, Cragin, Burton	3:44
12.	"Near to You"	Nicklas Sample, Sudol	4:35
13.	"Hope for the Hopeless"	Sudol, Cragin, Burton	4:17
14.	"Borrowed Time"	Sudol, Gus Black	4:13

== Charts ==
=== Weekly charts ===
Chart (2007–08)	Peak position
Austrian Albums (Ö3 Austria)	6
German Albums (Offizielle Top 100)	20
Swiss Albums (Schweizer Hitparade)	11
US Billboard 200	91
US Top Alternative Albums (Billboard)	20
US Heatseekers Albums (Billboard)	1

=== Weekly charts ===
Year End Chart (2008)	Position
Austrian Albums (Ö3 Austria)	55
German Albums (Offizielle Top 100)	73
Swiss Albums (Schweizer Hitparade)	59

=== Certifications ===
Region	Certification	Certified units/sales
Austria (IFPI Austria)	Gold	10,000^{*}
Germany (BVMI)	Gold	100,000^{^}
^{*} Sales figures based on certification alone.^{^} Shipments figures based on certification alone.

== Personnel ==
- Peter Bradley Adams – piano
- Jeff Blue – A&R
- Mick Bolger – accordion, horn, mellophonium
- Michael Brauer – mixing
- Hal Y. Burton – keyboards, programming, backing vocalist, engineer, mixing
- Lukas Burton – keyboards, programming, producer
- David Campbell – string arrangements
- Michael Chaves – guitar
- Larry Corbett – cello, soloist
- Hal Cragin – bass, guitar, producer
- Melinda Dahl – photography
- Joel Derouin – concert master
- Chris Fuhrman – mixing
- Darren Gilmore – management
- William Paden Hensley – digital editing, mixing assistant
- Danny Kalb – keyboards, programming, mixing
- Suzie Katayama – string contractor
- Stephen LeBlanc – piano, keyboards, vibraphone
- David Levita – acoustic guitar, balance engineer
- Paul Livingstone – sitar
- Stephen Marcussen – mastering
- Kevin McKeever – piano, keyboards
- Sean Mosher-Smith – creative director
- Chris Murphy – electric violin
- Daxx Nielsen – drums, backing vocalist
- Jimmy Paxson – percussion, drums
- Brian Scheuble – engineer
- Jessica St. Peter – animal sounds
- Chris Steffen – engineer
- Alison Sudol – piano, keyboards, vocals, backing vocalist, creative director
- Michael Valerio – engineer, double bass, string arrangements
- Joey Waronker – percussion, drums
- Stewart Whitmore – digital editing
- Sean Woolstenhulme – guitar
- Lyle Workman – guitar
