= Pines (album) =

Studio album by A Fine Frenzy
- Released: October 9, 2012
- Genre: indie rock
- Length: 67:42
- Label: Virgin
- Producer: Keefus Green

A Fine Frenzy chronology
A Fine Frenzy Live at the House of Blues Chicago (2009)	Pines (2012)

Singles from Pines
- 1. "Now is the Start" Released: July 30, 2012

Pines is the third and final studio album by A Fine Frenzy, the former stage name for American singer-songwriter Alison Sudol. The album was released in the United States on October 9, 2012, and in the United Kingdom on January 28, 2013, through Virgin Records. Pines is accompanied by a companion book and short animated film, 'The Story of Pines,' which premiered on TakePartTV on October 2.

To support the album, Sudol co-headlined the "Live and In Concert" tour throughout the United States and western Canada in October and November 2012 with musician Joshua Radin.

== Composition ==
Pines contains thirteen original tracks, each written or co-written by Sudol, and totals 67 minutes, 47 seconds in length. In an interview with Anthropologie, Sudol stated that "the entire record is a story, and each song is a chapter that leads into the next".

== Promotion ==
=== Singles ===
The song "Now Is the Start" was released as the lead single for "Pines" on July 30, 2012. Sudol performed the song live on The Tonight Show with Jay Leno on October 3, 2012. The accompanying music video was released on November 15, 2012.

Other songs

In addition, a music video for "Avalanches", a promotional single for "Pines", was released on October 9 to coincide with the album's release date. To date, lyric videos for both "Now Is The Start" and "Avalanches" have been posted to A Fine Frenzy's official YouTube account.

== Critical response ==
Professional ratings
Review scores
Source	Rating
Consequence of Sound	3/5 stars
AllMusic	4/5 stars
EY Magazine	4/5 stars

Reviews for Pines have been generally positive. Maggie Levin of mxdwn.com praised the quality of Sudol's writing and commented that "aptly, there is as much forest as longing in this record", concluding that "the journey is as diverse as it is exquisite, with moments of solemn austerity cleverly offset by felicitous rapture". Caitlin White of Spinner.com also gave the album a favorable review in her interview of Sudol, writing "Pines manages to combine the real world with the world of imagination in a very tangible way." Consequence of Sound awarded the album three out of five stars, asserting that Pines is "double-edged walk through the woods", and the album reflects "the sound of growing up". James Christopher Monger of AllMusic gave Pines four stars out of five, praising Sudol's successful integration of natural themes and emphasizing that "Sudol is a masterful architect of atmosphere" and her songs "all benefit from her ability to balance musicality with austerity, and like the rivers she draws much of her inspiration from, blissfully follow a course to the ocean of their own design". EY Magazine also awarded Pines four stars out of five, calling the album "authentic music" and remarking that "A Fine Frenzy releases the kind of music you're not only compelled to listen but dared to feel in your soul."

== Track listing ==
No.	Title	Writer(s)	Length
1.	"Pinesong"	Alison Sudol, Omar Velasco	7:43
2.	"Winds of Wander"	Sudol	6:05
3.	"Avalanches (Culla's Song)"	Sudol	3:31
4.	"Riversong"	Sudol	7:46
5.	"The Sighting"	Sudol, Velasco	4:59
6.	"Dream in the Dark"	Sudol, Jonathon Wilson	3:20
7.	"Sailingsong"	Sudol	4:25
8.	"Sadseasong"	Sudol, Jesse Siebenberg	6:10
9.	"They Can't If You Don't Let Them"	Sudol	4:57
10.	"Dance of the Gray Whales"	Sudol	2:50
11.	"It's Alive"	Sudol	3:45
12.	"Now Is the Start"	Sudol	4:46
13.	"Untitled (Grasses Grow)"	Sudol	7:25

Track listing adapted from Allmusic.

== Charts ==
Charts	Peak position
US Billboard 200	62
US Billboard Digital Albums	20
US Billboard Rock Albums	28

== Tour ==
Date	City	Country	Venue
October 11, 2012	Santa Rosa	United States	Wells Fargo Center
October 12, 2012	San Francisco	United States	Warfield Theatre
October 13, 2012	Newport Beach	United States	Balboa Beach Fest
October 16, 2012	Portland	United States	Crystal Ballroom
October 17, 2012	Vancouver	Canada	Vogue Theatre
October 18, 2012	Seattle	United States	City Arts Festival
October 20, 2012	Edmonton	Canada	McDougall United Church
October 21, 2012	Calgary	Canada	Knox United Church
October 23, 2012	Winnipeg	Canada	Garrick Center
October 25, 2012	Minneapolis	United States	Mill City Nights
October 26, 2012	Chicago	United States	The Vic Theatre
October 27, 2012	Detroit	United States	Majestic Theater
October 29, 2012	New York City	United States	Best Buy Theater
October 30, 2012	Philadelphia	United States	Electric Factory
November 1, 2012	Toronto	Canada	Danforth Music Hall
November 2, 2012	Montreal	Canada	Corona Theatre
November 3, 2012	Boston	United States	Orpheum Theatre
November 5, 2012	Charlottesville	United States	Paramount Theater
November 7, 2012	Durham	United States	Carolina Theatre
November 8, 2012	Atlanta	United States	Buckhead Theatre
November 9, 2012	Nashville	United States	Marathon Music Works
November 10, 2012	Birmingham	United States	Workplay Soundstage
November 12, 2012	Houston	United States	House of Blues
November 13, 2012	Austin	United States	Paramount Theatre
November 14, 2012	Dallas	United States	House of Blues
November 16, 2012	Los Angeles	United States	Wiltern Theatre

Tour listing adapted from A Fine Frenzy's official live page.

== Personnel ==
- Alison Sudol – composer, percussion, piano, programming, vocals
- Jon Brion – bass, guitar, instrumentation, keyboards, pump organ
- Matt Chamberlain – drums, percussion
- Omar Cowan – guitar, programming, vocals (background)
- Keefus Green – keyboards, piano, producer, programming, pump organ, vibraphone
- Gabe Noel – bass, bass (upright), bowed bass, cello
- Martin Tillman – cello, electric cello
- Peter Bradley Adams – piano
- Jonathan Wilson – composer, drums, ukulele
- Jesse Siebenberg – composer
- Omar Velasco – composer
- Paul Ackling – guitar technician
- Ronette Bowie – A&R
- Dan McCarroll – A&R
- Eric Caudieux – engineer, Pro-Tools
- Greg Koller – engineer, mixing
- Hugo Nicholson – engineer
- Paul Smith – second engineer
- Patricia Sullivan Fourstar – mastering
- Nicole Frantz – Creative director
- Bob Semanovich – Product manager
- Abby Weintraub – Design

Personnel adapted from Allmusic.
