= Alison Sudol =

American actress and musician (born 1984)

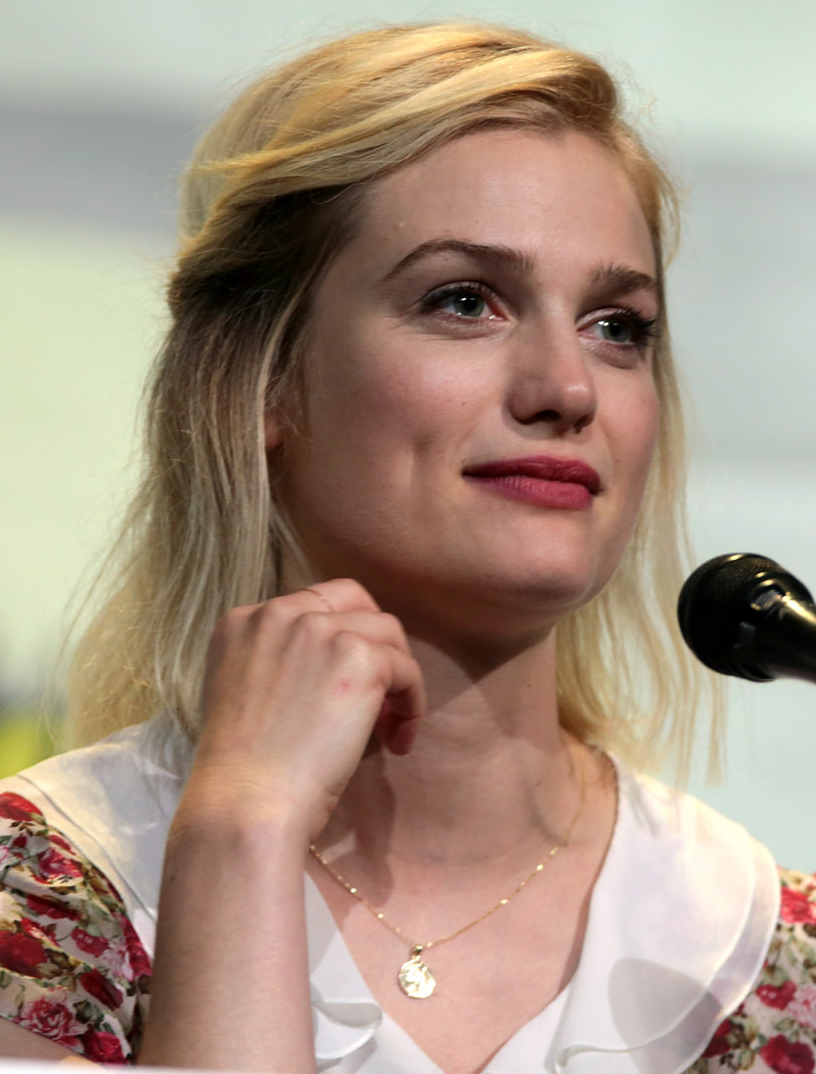
- Sudol at the 2016 San Diego Comic-Con
- Born: December 23, 1984 (age 41); Seattle, Washington, U.S.
- Other names: A Fine Frenzy; Alison Monro
- Occupations: Actress; singer; songwriter
- Years active: 1997–present
- Musical career
- Genres: Adult alternative; indie rock
- Instruments: Vocals; piano; guitar
- Label: Virgin
- Website: alisonsudol.com

Alison Sudol (born December 23, 1984) is an American actress, singer and songwriter. She was formerly known as the singer A Fine Frenzy, and is known for her role as Queenie Goldstein in Fantastic Beasts and Where to Find Them (2016), as well as its sequels The Crimes of Grindelwald (2018) and The Secrets of Dumbledore (2022). Her music has been featured in numerous television shows and movies.

== Early life ==
Sudol was born in Seattle, Washington, to dramatic arts teacher Sondra (Fraser) West-Moore and acting coach John Sudol. She and both parents moved to Los Angeles after their divorce, when she was five. She grew up listening to a wide range of music, including Aretha Franklin, and Ella Fitzgerald and other swing artists. She cites Bob Dylan, Johnny Cash and Simon and Garfunkel as some of her biggest musical influences.

She graduated from high school at 16. She considered herself "nerdy and quiet", and did not "drink or smoke or do anything like that". She told an interviewer, "I was so nervous about going into college like that and super young. I figured I would take two years and try to find out what I was doing with music. And when I was 18, I was just so deep into it that I didn't want to stop."

Sudol had a passion for literature, immersing herself in the works of C. S. Lewis, E. B. White, Lewis Carroll, Anthony Trollope and Charles Dickens. Her stage name, A Fine Frenzy, is taken from a verse in William Shakespeare's A Midsummer Night's Dream: "The poet's eye, in a fine frenzy rolling, doth glance from heaven to earth, from earth to heaven" (Act 5, Scene 1). After teaching herself to play the piano, she began writing songs.

A short demo she sent out received attention from EMI's Jason Flom, who signed her after visiting her house and "listening to her play".

== Career ==
=== 2007–2013: Music releases ===
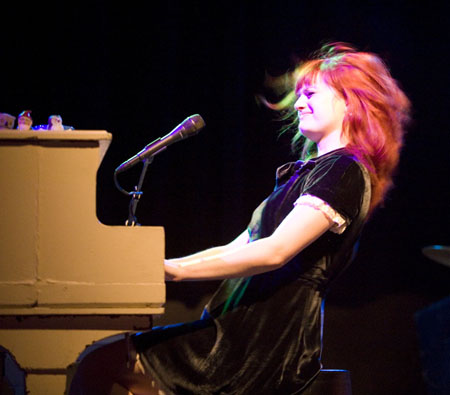
Sudol playing the piano, Salt Lake City, 2008

In March 2007, she appeared at the South by Southwest (SXSW) conference, opening for The Stooges. Shortly after, her debut album, One Cell in the Sea, was released to generally positive reviews, and its first single, "Almost Lover", peaked at No. 25 on Billboard's Hot Adult Contemporary Tracks chart. In mid-2007, she secured another opening spot, for Rufus Wainwright on his tour. In March and April 2008, she headlined her own tour in the US and Canada; and in April toured France, Belgium, Germany and Switzerland. In September 2008, she was the star act on the opening night of the New Pop Festival organized by the German broadcaster SWR3. She returned to Germany, Austria and Switzerland on a headline tour in November 2008 and played in the Super Bock em Stock festival in Portugal in December 2008.

Her song "You Picked Me" was featured on iTunes as one of the "Free Singles of the Week" for August 14, 2007, and VH1 featured her as one of their "You Oughta Know" artists. In October 2008, "You Picked Me" was chosen as a network theme by SIC, a Portuguese television network. To date, One Cell in the Sea has sold 300,000 copies. In 2008 it was released in Germany, Austria, Switzerland and Poland. In each of those countries, the album peaked within the top 30, with the first single, "Almost Lover," reaching No. 8 in Germany, No. 10 on the Swiss charts, and No. 5 in Austria. Sudol's second album, Bomb in a Birdcage, was released September 8, 2009. The first single, "Blow Away," was released on July 17, 2009, followed by two more, "Happier" and "Electric Twist". On November 23, 2009, a live album and concert film recorded in 2007, A Fine Frenzy Live at the House of Blues Chicago, was released on iTunes.

On October 31, 2011, Sudol stated via Twitter that the band was mastering their new record. Several songs, including "Avalanches" and "Riversong", were confirmed during her appearance at the Sundance Film Festival. In the March 2012 issue of Lucky magazine, she revealed the third album's title, Pines. Previously scheduled for release in September 2012, its release date was pushed back to October 9. Along with Pines, Sudol released an animated short film and a companion book illustrated by Jen Lobo. In September 2012, A Fine Frenzy was featured in a campaign called "30 Songs / 30 Days" to support Half the Sky: Turning Oppression into Opportunity for Women Worldwide, a multi-platform media project inspired by Nicholas Kristof and Sheryl WuDunn's book. Afterwards, Sudol stated that she would no longer perform as A Fine Frenzy, although she continues to write songs: "I put A Fine Frenzy to bed".

=== 2014–present: Acting and return to music ===
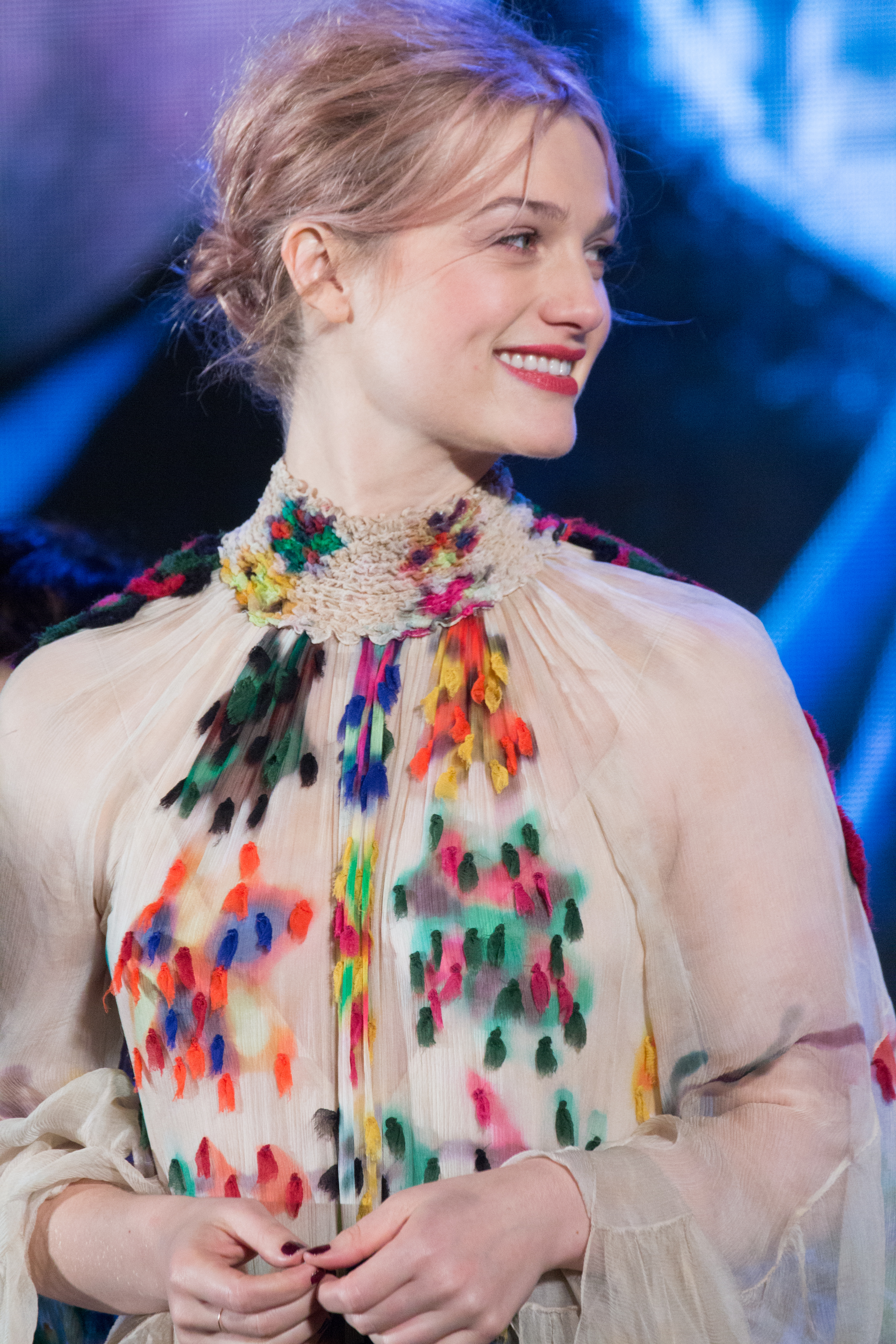
Sudol at the 2016 Japan premiere of Fantastic Beasts and Where to Find Them

In 2014, Sudol focused on her acting career. She starred as Kaya in the recurring cast of the first season of the Amazon Video series Transparent, as a singer and love interest of Jay Duplass' character Josh. Sudol and fellow cast member Clementine Creevy recorded a cover of Jim Croce's song "Operator (That's Not The Way It Feels)" under the band name Glitterish. A full version of the song was included on the Transparent soundtrack album released in December 2014. She also starred in the television series Dig as the archeologist Emma Wilson. Elle named Sudol one of "The 7 Most Exciting Newcomers on TV this Season" in January 2015.

In 2016, Sudol co-starred in the film Fantastic Beasts and Where to Find Them, the first in a series of three Harry Potter prequel films written by J. K. Rowling. Sudol plays Queenie Goldstein, the younger sister of Tina (Katherine Waterston). The film, set in New York 65 years before Harry Potter's story starts, is based on the Hogwarts textbook of the same name, and follows the adventures of its author, "magizoologist" Newt Scamander (played by Eddie Redmayne). Sudol reprised the role in the sequels Fantastic Beasts: The Crimes of Grindelwald and Fantastic Beasts: The Secrets of Dumbledore. After a hiatus from music, on November 24, 2017, Sudol released the single "Enough Honey" under her own name. In 2018 and 2019, she released two EPs titled Moon and Moonlite, respectively, and went on a short tour of shows to promote both. Sudol began to release music again throughout 2022, including the singles ″Peaches″ and ″Meteor Shower″. On July 8, 2022, she announced her first album under her own name entitled Still Come the Night, set for release on September 30. The album was released to positive reviews.

== Charities and conservation ==
Since 2011, Sudol has been a goodwill ambassador for the International Union for Conservation of Nature. She designed three t-shirts for Alternative Apparel in support for IUCN. She is also Greenpeace's first Arctic Ambassador.

== Filmography ==
Film roles
Year	Title	Role	Notes
1997	Here Dies Another Day	Girl No. 1	As Alison Monro
2002	The Gray in Between	21 Yr. Old	As Alison Monro
2004	Little Black Boot	Singer	Short film
2012	The Story of Pines	Pines	Short film
2015	Other People's Children	Winter	
2016	Fantastic Beasts and Where to Find Them	Queenie Goldstein	
2016	Between Us	Nadia	
2018	Fantastic Beasts: The Crimes of Grindelwald	Queenie Goldstein	
2019	The Last Full Measure	Tara Huffman	
2022	Fantastic Beasts: The Secrets of Dumbledore	Queenie Goldstein	
2023	Bonus Track	Julia	

Television roles
Year	Title	Role	Notes
2007	CSI:NY	Nova Kent	Episode: "Can You Hear Me Now?"
2014	Transparent	Kaya	Recurring role (season 1)
2015	Dig	Emma Wilson	Main role

Video Game roles
Year	Title	Role
2016	Lego Dimensions	Queenie Goldstein (voice)

== Discography ==
- One Cell in the Sea (2007)
- Bomb in a Birdcage (2009)
- Pines (2012)
- Still Come the Night (2022)

== Tours ==
- One Cell in the Sea Tour (2007–2008)
- Birdcage Tour (2009–2010)
- Pines Tour (2012)
- Moon/Moonlite tour (2019)
