= Crazy Heart (soundtrack) =

Crazy Heart: Original Motion Picture Soundtrack

Soundtrack album by Various artists
- Released: January 19, 2010
- Length: 48:43
- Label: New West Records
- Producers: T Bone Burnett, Stephen Bruton, Jeff Bridges (executive)

Crazy Heart: Original Motion Picture Soundtrack is a 2010 film soundtrack album to accompany the film Crazy Heart directed by Scott Cooper starring Jeff Bridges and Maggie Gyllenhaal.

== Songwriters ==
The album was released January 19, 2010 to accompany the film. The 16-track album contains several songs written by T Bone Burnett, Stephen Bruton, and Ryan Bingham, with some by John Goodwin, Bob Neuwirth, Sam Hopkins, Gary Nicholson, Townes Van Zandt, Sam Phillips, Greg Brown, Billy Joe Shaver, and Eddy Shaver.

== Performers ==
The songs are performed by various artists including actors Jeff Bridges, Colin Farrell, and Robert Duvall, as well as singers Ryan Bingham (who also sings the theme song "The Weary Kind"), Buck Owens, The Louvin Brothers, Lightnin' Hopkins, Waylon Jennings, Townes Van Zandt, and Sam Phillips.

== Awards and nominations ==
On January 17, 2010, the theme song "The Weary Kind", written by Ryan Bingham and T-Bone Burnett, was awarded the Golden Globe for Best Original Song at the 67th Golden Globe Awards. The song also won the Academy Award for Best Original Song at the 82nd Academy Awards and a Grammy for Best Song Written For Motion Picture, Television Or Other Visual Media at the 53rd Grammy Awards. The soundtrack also won a Grammy for Best Compilation Soundtrack Album For Motion Picture, Television Or Other Visual Media at the same ceremony.

== Track listing ==
No.	Title	Writer(s)	Performer	Length
1.	"Hold On You"	Stephen Bruton, T-Bone Burnett, John Goodwin, Bob Neuwirth	Jeff Bridges	2:53
2.	"Hello Trouble"	Orville Couch, Eddie McDuff	Buck Owens	1:52
3.	"My Baby's Gone"	Hazel Houser	The Louvin Brothers	2:46
4.	"Somebody Else"	Bruton, Burnett	Jeff Bridges	4:38
5.	"I Don't Know"	Bruton, Burnett	Ryan Bingham	2:23
6.	"Fallin' & Flyin'"	Bruton, Gary Nicholson	Jeff Bridges	3:02
7.	"I Don't Know"	Bruton, Burnett	Jeff Bridges	2:15
8.	"Once a Gambler"	Sam Hopkins	Lightnin' Hopkins	4:55
9.	"Are You Sure Hank Done It This Way"	Waylon Jennings	Waylon Jennings	2:55
10.	"Fallin' & Flyin'"	Bruton, Nicholson	Colin Farrell, Jeff Bridges	2:42
11.	"Gone, Gone, Gone"	Ryan Bingham, Burnett	Colin Farrell	2:39
12.	"If I Needed You"	Townes Van Zandt	Townes Van Zandt	3:26
13.	"Reflecting Light"	Sam Phillips	Sam Phillips	3:21
14.	"Live Forever"	Billy Joe Shaver, Eddy Shaver	Robert Duvall	0:50
15.	"Brand New Angel"	Greg Brown	Jeff Bridges	3:48
16.	"The Weary Kind" (Theme from Crazy Heart)	Bingham, Burnett	Ryan Bingham	4:18
Total length:				48:43

=== Limited Deluxe Edition ===
1. "Hold On You" 2:53
2. "Hello Trouble" 1:52
3. "My Baby's Gone" 2:46
4. "Somebody Else (Instrumental)" 1:56
  - Performed by Stephen Bruton
5. "Somebody Else" 4:38
6. "I Don't Know" 2:23
7. "Wesley's Piano" 1:24
  - Performed by Thomas Canning
8. "Fallin' & Flyin'" 3:02
9. "Searching (For Someone Like You)" 2:38
  - Performed by Kitty Wells
10. "I Don't Know" 2:16
11. "Once a Gambler" 4:56
12. "Are You Sure Hank Done It This Way" 2:55
13. "I Let the Freight Train Carry Me On" 2:34
  - Performed by The Delmore Brothers
14. "Color of the Blues" 2:52
  - Performed by George Jones
15. "Joy" 4:07
  - Performed by Lucinda Williams
16. "Fallin' & Flyin'" 2:43
17. "Gone, Gone, Gone" 2:39
18. "If I Needed You" 3:36
19. "Reflecting Light" 3:21
20. "Mal Hombre" 3:31
  - Performed by Lydia Mendoza
21. "Live Forever" :50
22. "Brand New Angel" 3:49
23. "The Weary Kind (Theme From Crazy Heart)" 4:16

== Charts ==
=== Weekly charts ===
Chart (2010)	Peak position
Belgian Albums (Ultratop Flanders)	79
New Zealand Albums (RMNZ)	39
US Billboard 200	18
US Top Country Albums (Billboard)	6
US Independent Albums (Billboard)	1
US Soundtrack Albums (Billboard)	2

=== Year-end charts ===
Chart (2010)	Position
US Billboard 200	120
US Top Country Albums (Billboard)	17
US Soundtrack Albums (Billboard)	12
