= 14th Satellite Awards =

US awards ceremony for film and television

- Date: December 20, 2009

Highlights
- Best drama film: The Hurt Locker
- Best comedy/musical film: Nine
- Best television drama: Breaking Bad
- Best television musical/comedy: Glee
- Best director: Kathryn Bigelow for The Hurt Locker

The 14th Satellite Awards is an award ceremony honoring the year's outstanding performers, films, television shows, home videos and interactive media, presented by the International Press Academy at the InterContinental Hotel in Los Angeles.

The nominations were announced on November 30, 2009. The winners were announced on December 20, 2009.

== Special achievement awards ==
Auteur Award (for his trademark style of imaginative special effects and plots) – Roger Corman

Mary Pickford Award (for outstanding contribution to the entertainment industry) – Michael York

Nikola Tesla Award (for his creative cinematography in films) – Roger Deakins

Outstanding Guest Star – Kristin Chenoweth (Glee)

Outstanding New Talent – Gabourey Sidibe (Precious)

== Motion picture winners and nominees ==
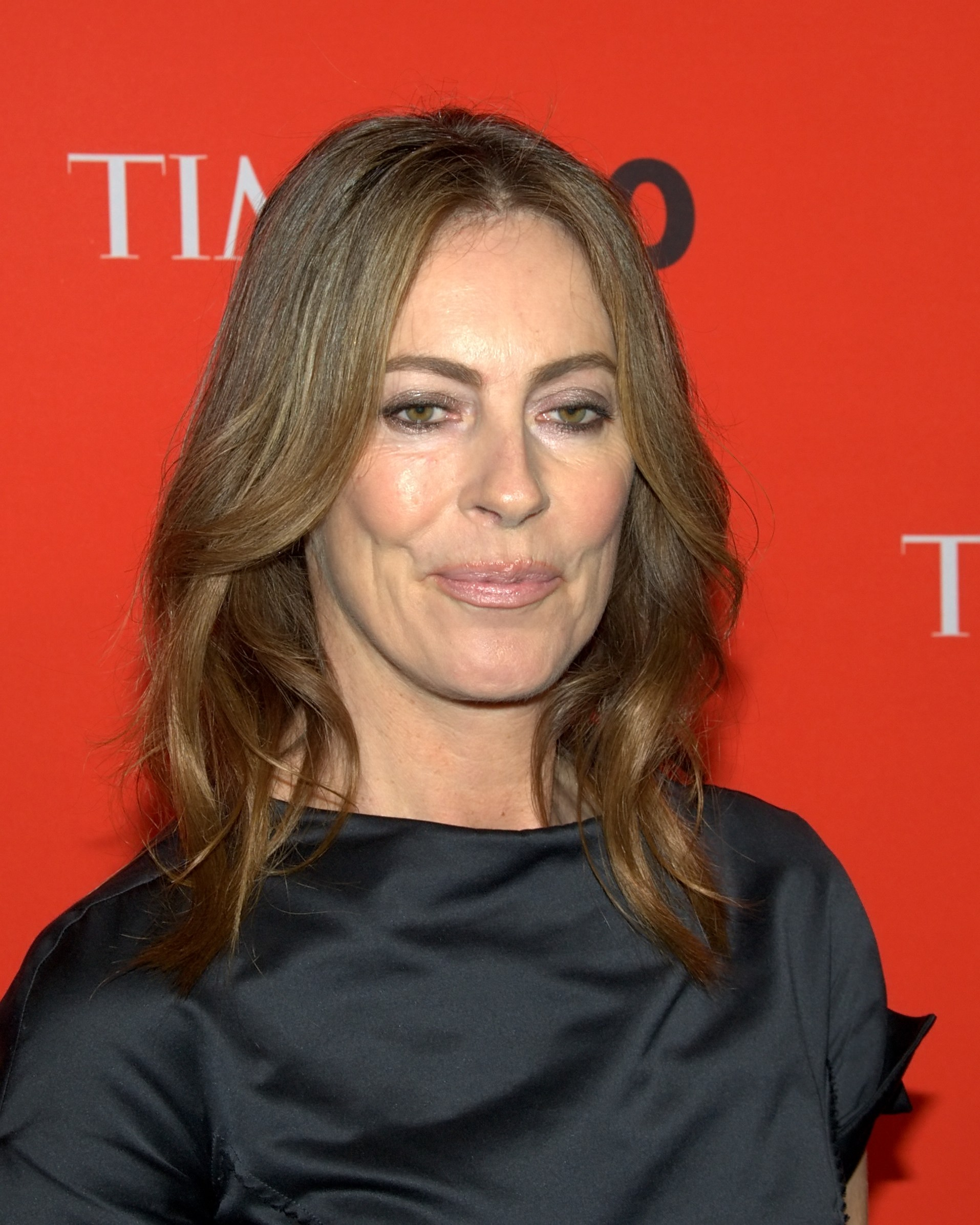
Kathryn Bigelow, Best Director winner

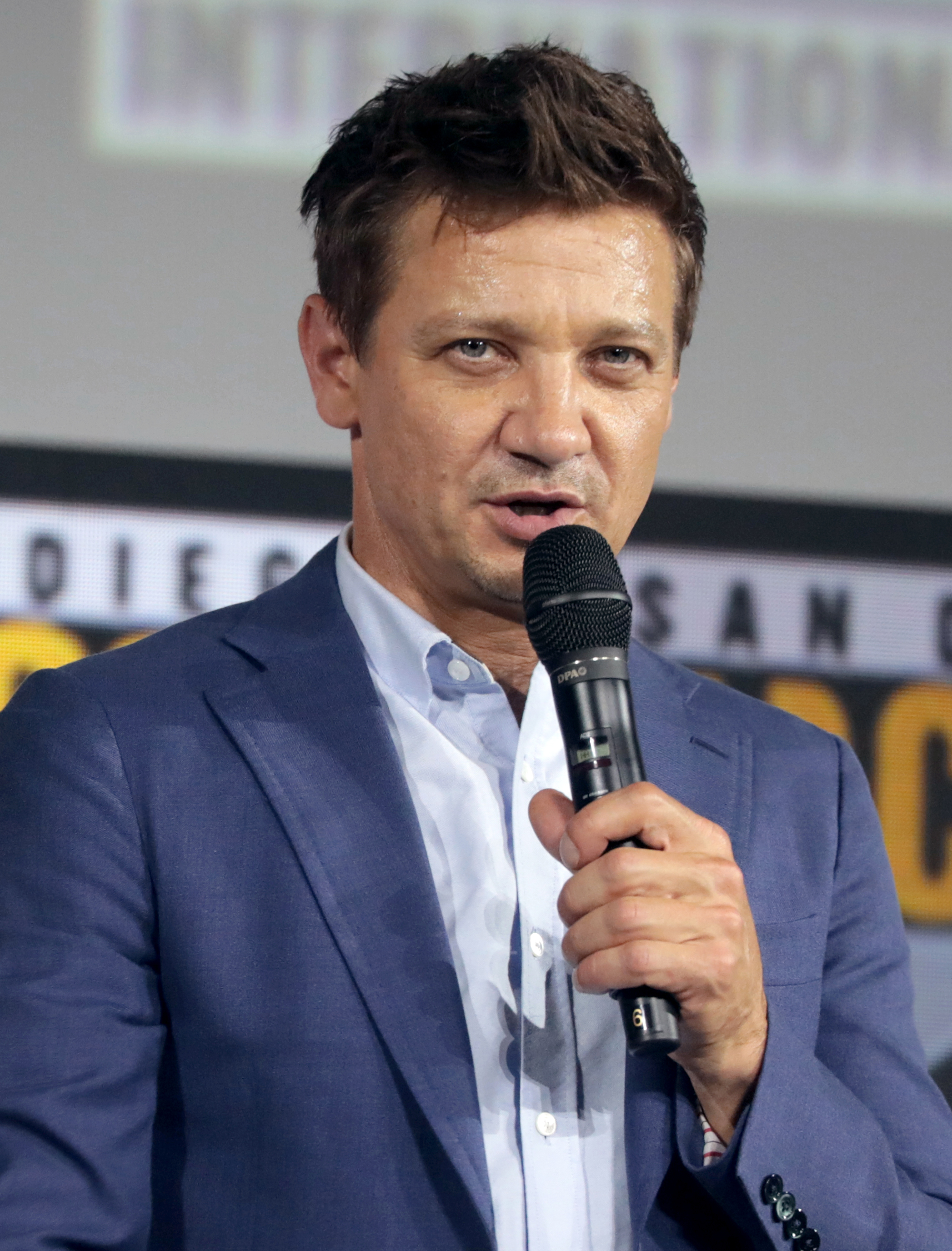
Jeremy Renner, Best Actor in a Motion Picture – Drama winner

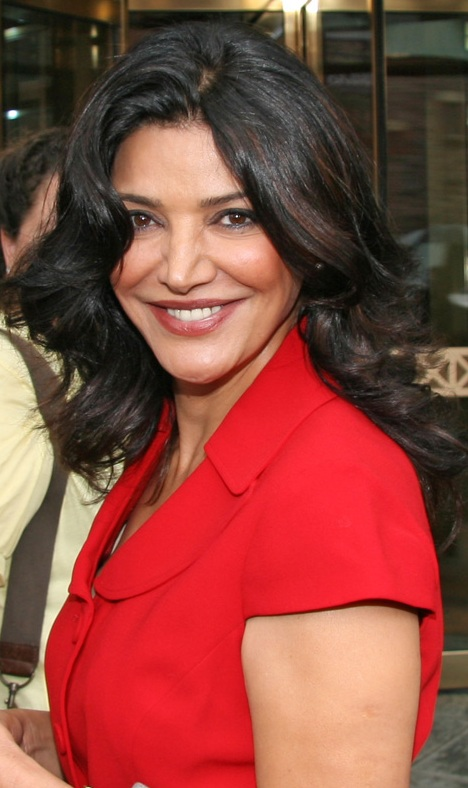
Shohreh Aghdashloo, Best Actress in a Motion Picture – Drama winner

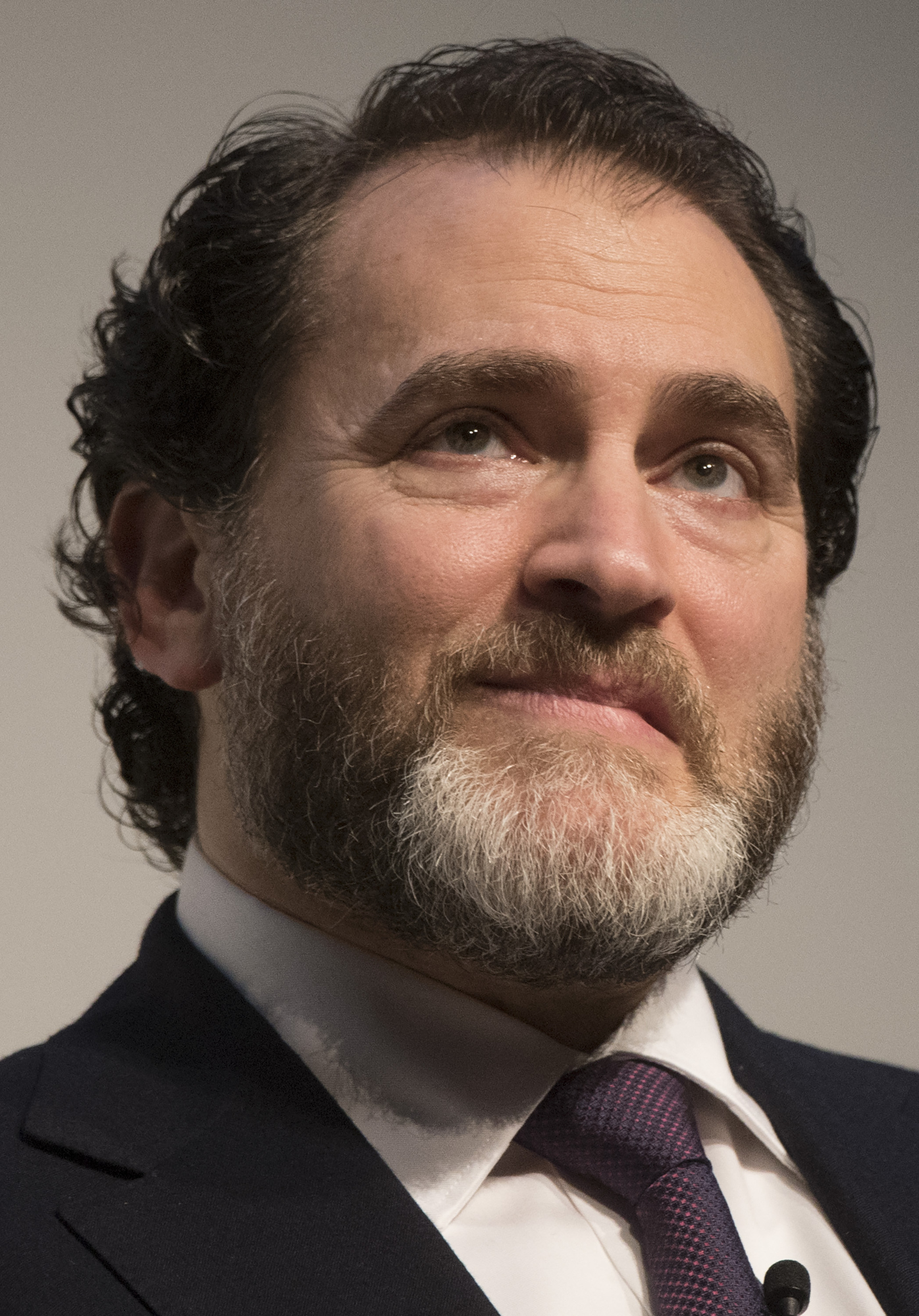
Michael Stuhlbarg, Best Actor in a Motion Picture – Comedy or Musical winner

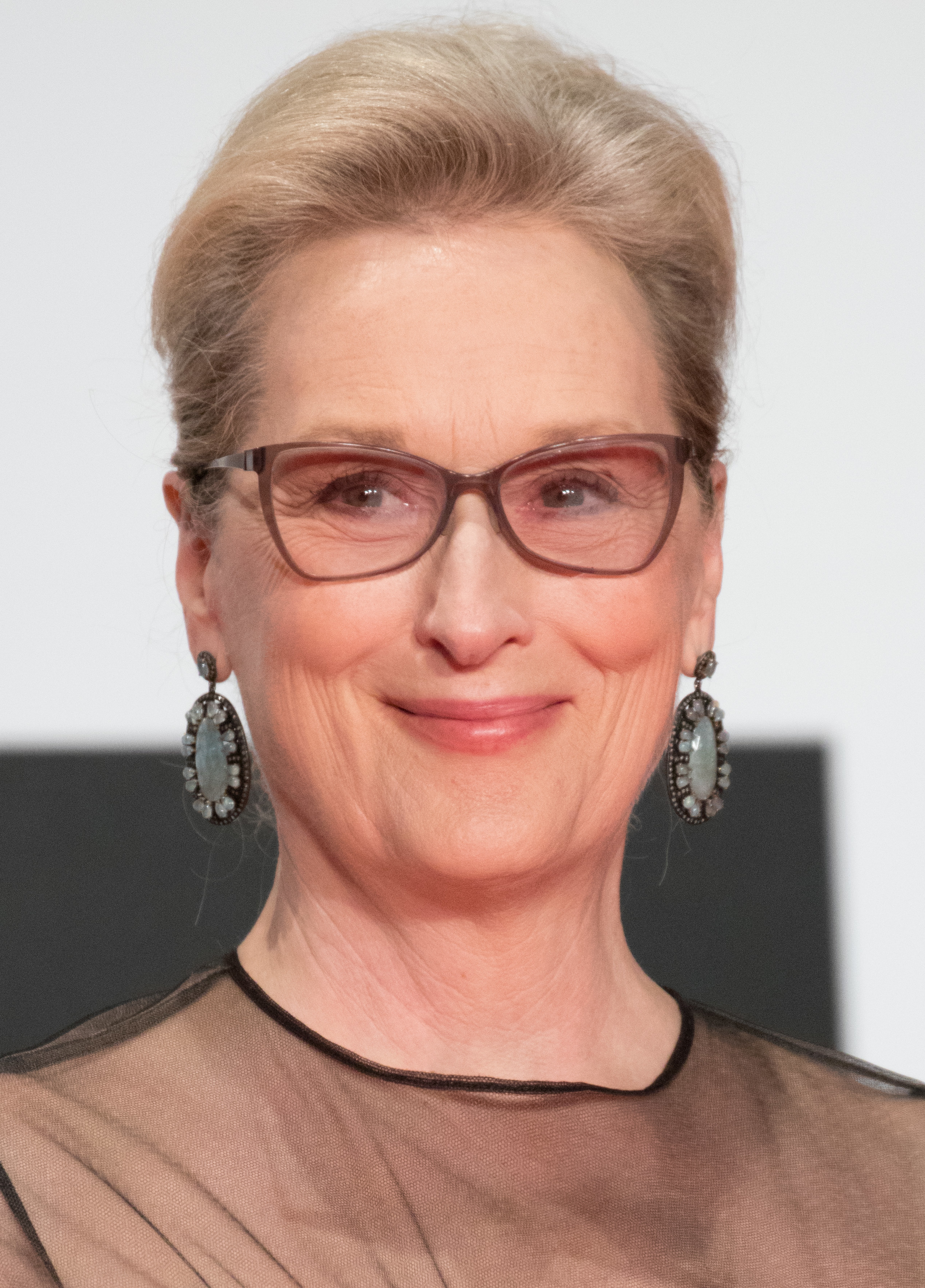
Meryl Streep, Best Actress in a Motion Picture – Comedy or Musical winner

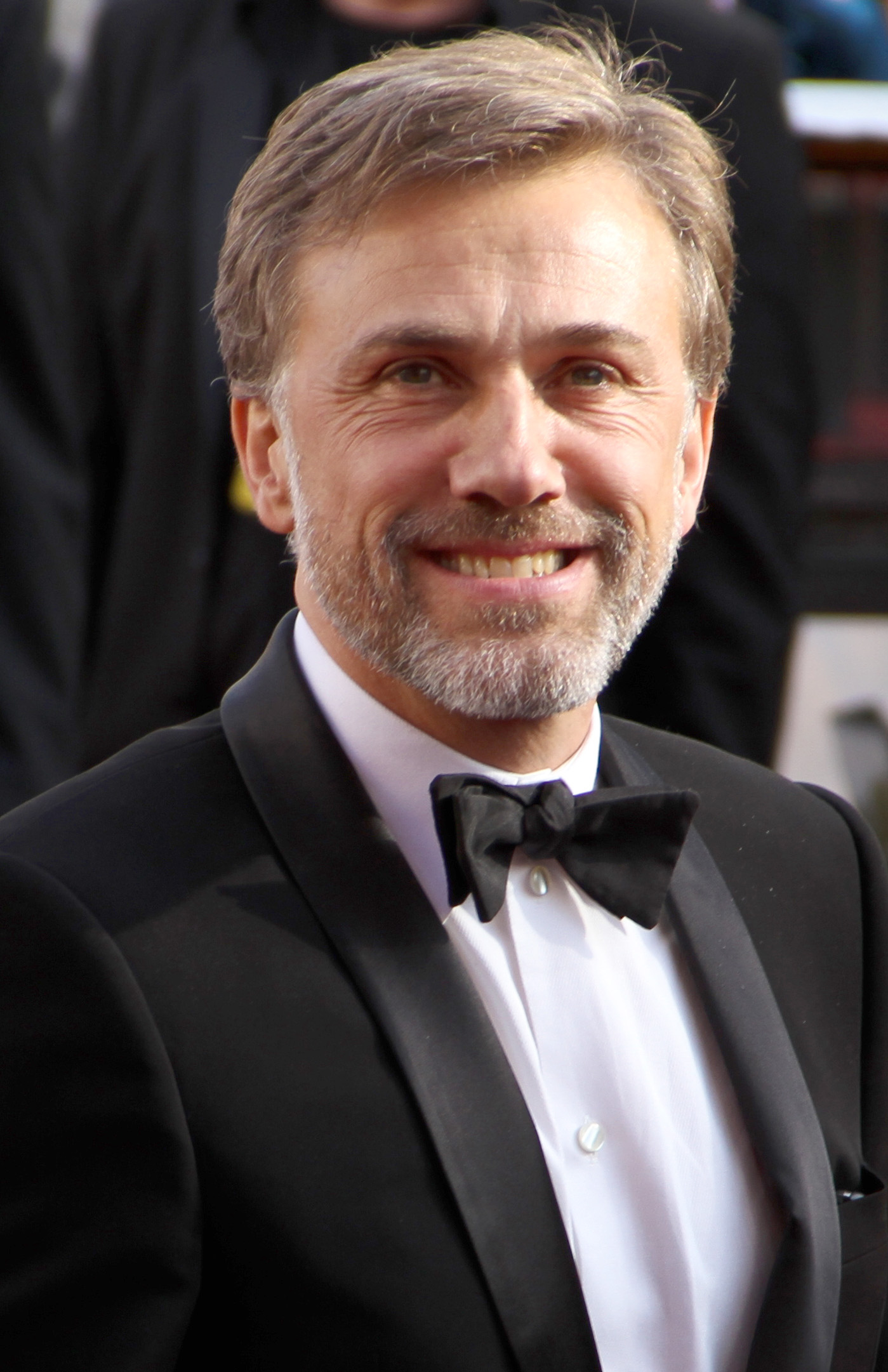
Christoph Waltz, Best Supporting Actor in a Motion Picture winner

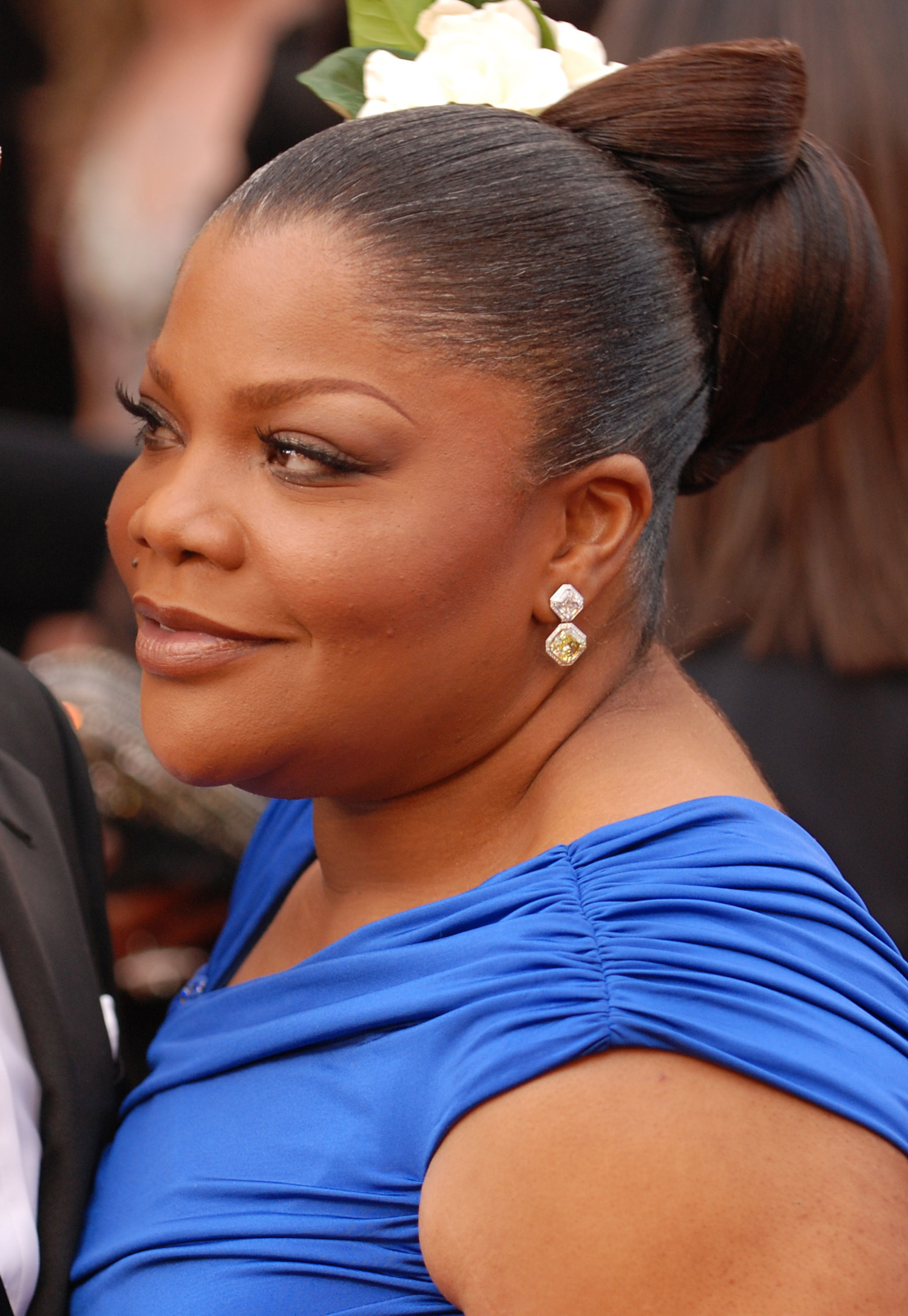
Mo'Nique, Best Supporting Actress in a Motion Picture winner

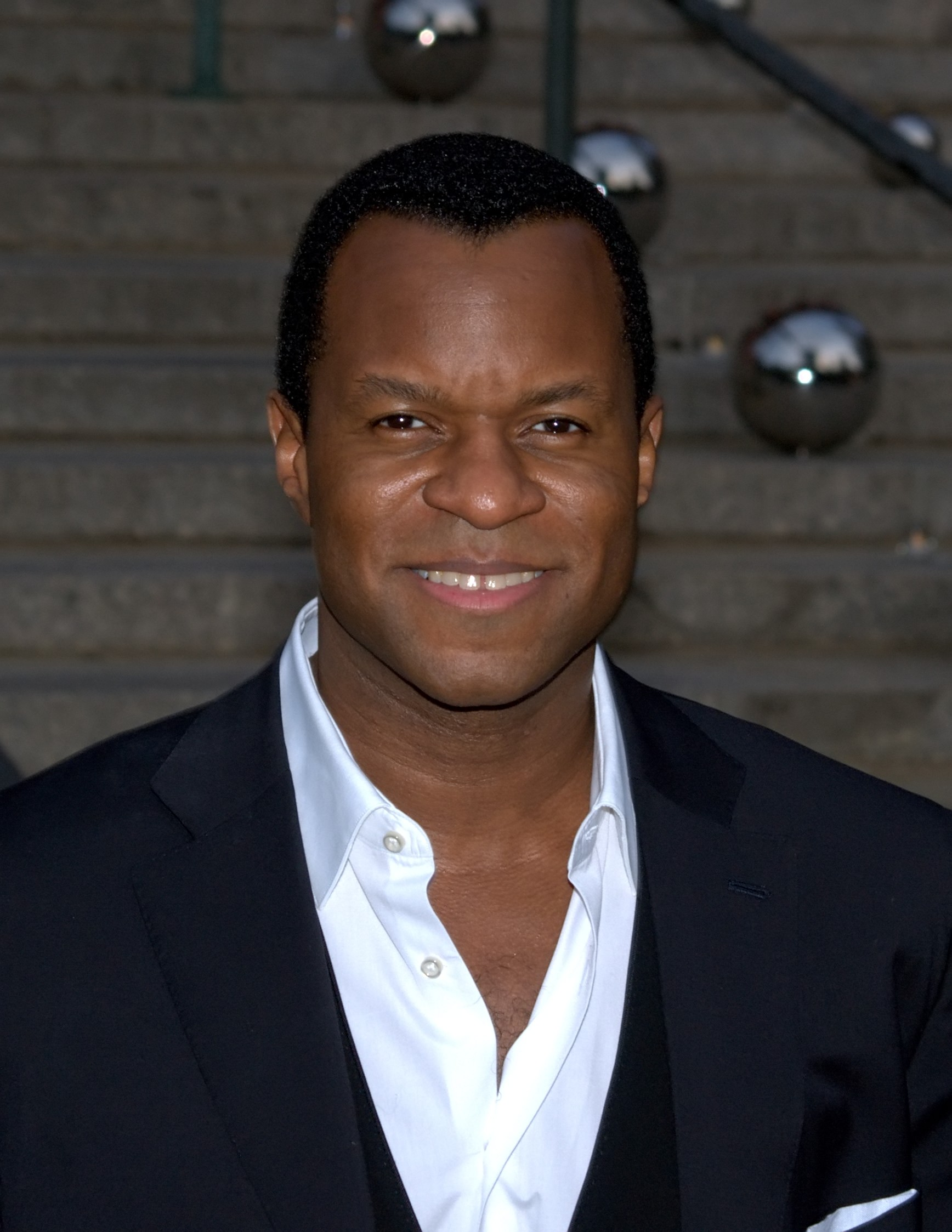
Geoffrey Fletcher, Best Adapted Screenplay winner

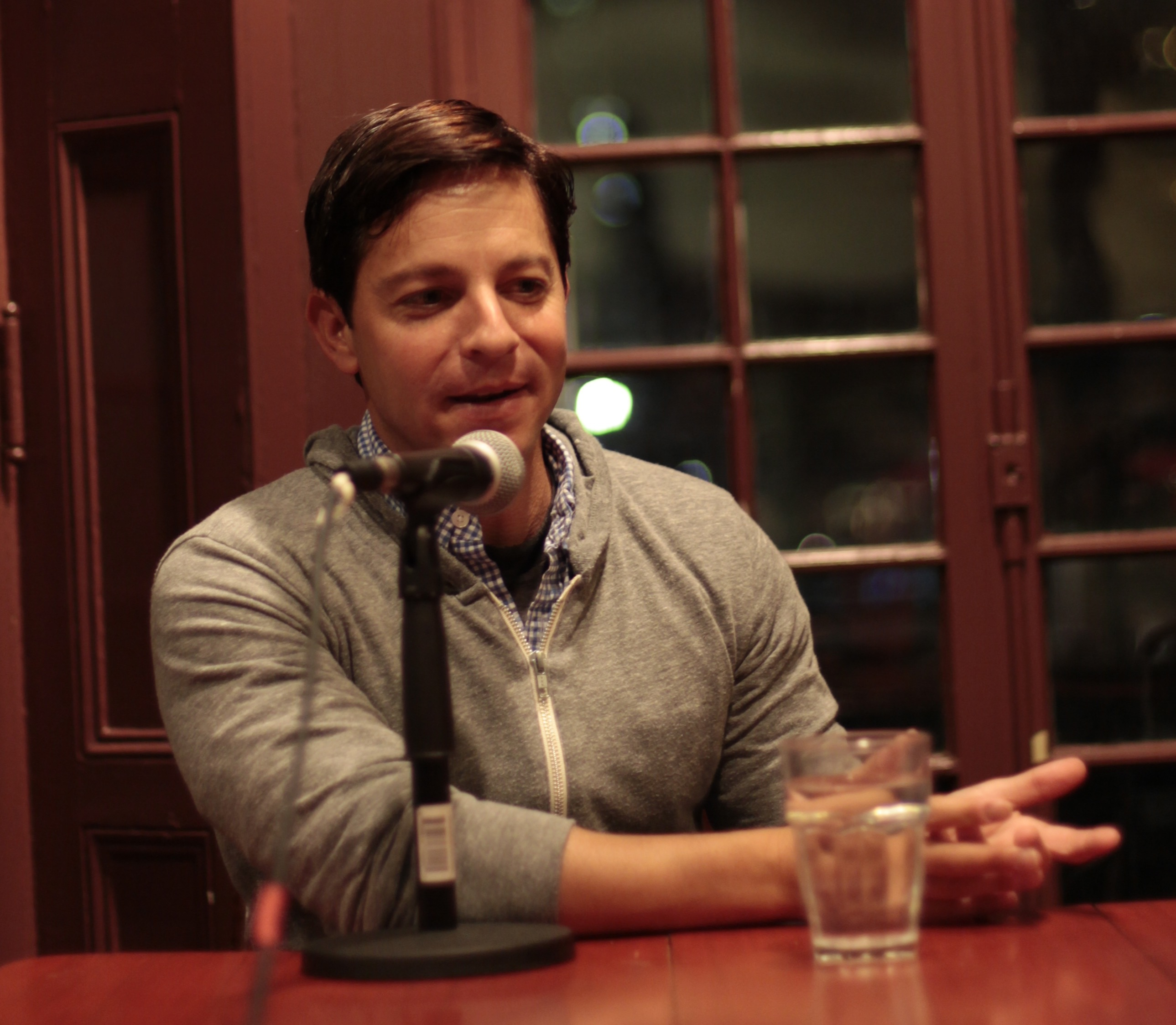
Scott Neustadter, Best Original Screenplay co-winner

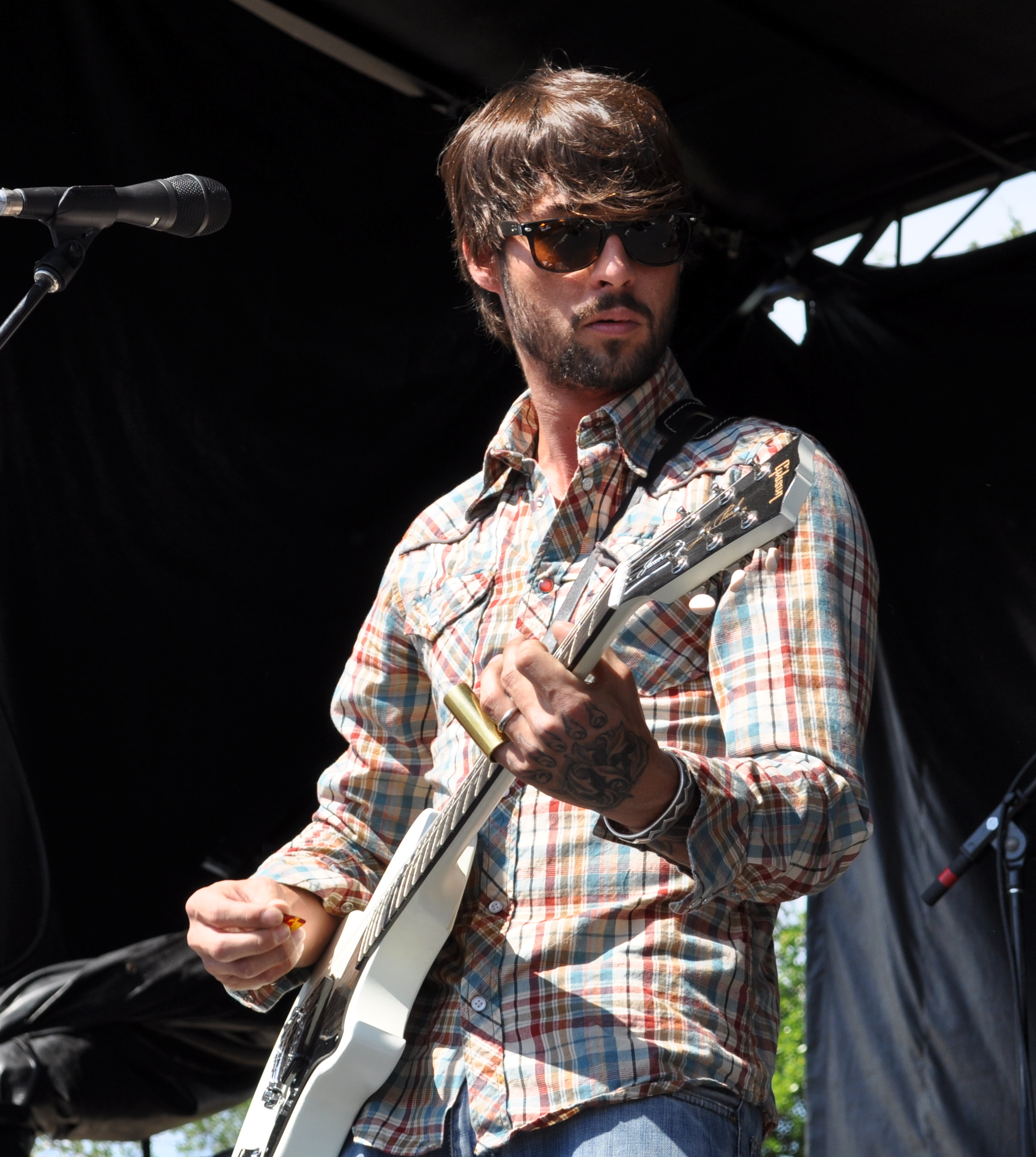
Ryan Bingham, Best Original Song co-winner

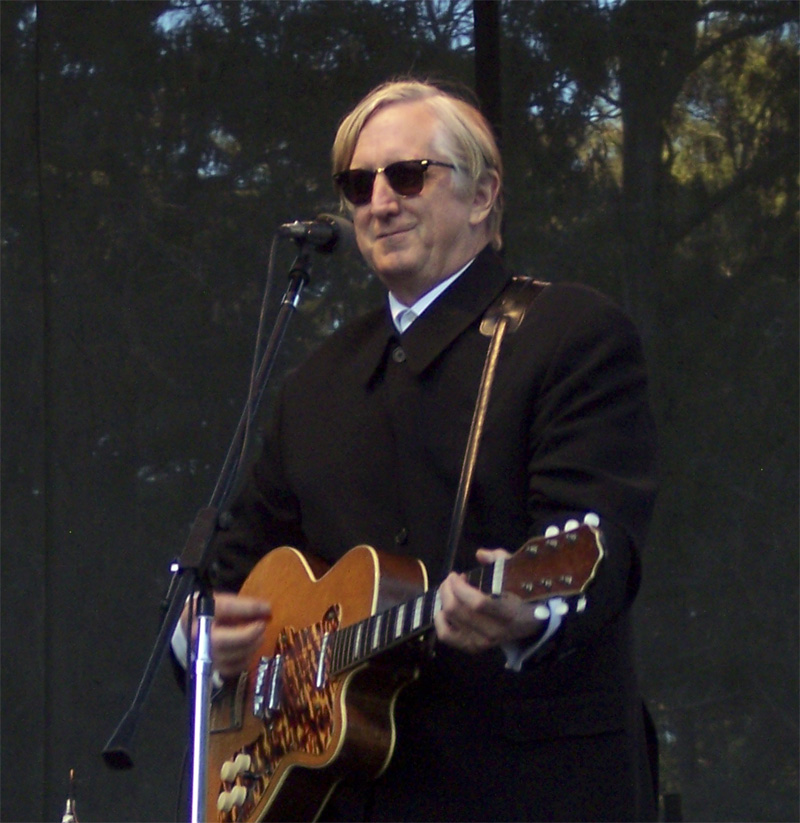
T Bone Burnett, Best Original Song co-winner

=== Best Actor – Drama ===
Jeremy Renner for The Hurt Locker

- Jeff Bridges for Crazy Heart
- Hugh Dancy for Adam
- Johnny Depp for Public Enemies
- Colin Firth for A Single Man
- Michael Sheen for The Damned United

=== Best Actor – Musical or Comedy ===
Michael Stuhlbarg for A Serious Man

- George Clooney for Up in the Air
- Bradley Cooper for The Hangover
- Matt Damon for The Informant!
- Daniel Day-Lewis for Nine

=== Best Actress – Drama ===
Shohreh Aghdashloo for The Stoning of Soraya M.

- Emily Blunt for The Young Victoria
- Abbie Cornish for Bright Star
- Penélope Cruz for Broken Embraces
- Carey Mulligan for An Education
- Catalina Saavedra for The Maid

=== Best Actress – Musical or Comedy ===
Meryl Streep for Julie & Julia

- Sandra Bullock for The Proposal
- Marion Cotillard for Nine
- Zooey Deschanel for (500) Days of Summer
- Katherine Heigl for The Ugly Truth

=== Best Animated or Mixed Media Film ===
Fantastic Mr. Fox

- Cloudy with a Chance of Meatballs
- Harry Potter and the Half-Blood Prince
- The Princess and the Frog
- Up
- Where the Wild Things Are

=== Best Art Direction and Production Design ===
A Single Man

- 2012
- The Imaginarium of Doctor Parnassus
- Public Enemies
- Red Cliff
- The Road

=== Best Cinematography ===
Dion Beebe for Nine

- Roger Deakins for A Serious Man
- Zhang Li and Lü Yue for Red Cliff
- Guillermo Navarro and Erich Roland for It Might Get Loud
- Robert Richardson for Inglourious Basterds
- Dante Spinotti for Public Enemies

=== Best Costume Design ===
Monique Prudhomme for The Imaginarium of Doctor Parnassus

- Colleen Atwood for Nine
- Consolata Boyle for Chéri
- Sandy Powell for The Young Victoria
- Tim Yip for Red Cliff

=== Best Director ===
Kathryn Bigelow for The Hurt Locker

- Neill Blomkamp for District 9
- Jane Campion for Bright Star
- Lee Daniels for Precious
- Rob Marshall for Nine
- Lone Scherfig for An Education

=== Best Documentary Film ===
Every Little Step

- The Beaches of Agnès
- The Cove
- It Might Get Loud
- The September Issue
- Valentino: The Last Emperor

=== Best Editing ===
Chris Innis and Bob Murawski for The Hurt Locker

- David Brenner for 2012
- Julian Clarke for District 9
- Robert A. Ferretti, Yang Hongyu, Angie Lam, and David Wu for Red Cliff
- Greg Finton for It Might Get Loud
- Claire Simpson and Wyatt Smith for Nine

=== Best Film – Drama ===
The Hurt Locker

- Bright Star
- An Education
- The Messenger
- Precious
- The Stoning of Soraya M. (Sangsâr Sorayâ M.)

=== Best Film – Musical or Comedy ===
Nine

- The Informant!
- It's Complicated
- Julie & Julia
- A Serious Man
- Up in the Air

=== Best Foreign Language Film ===
Broken Embraces (Los abrazos rotos) • Spain (TIE)
The Maid (La Nana) • Chile (TIE)

- I Killed My Mother (J'ai tué ma mère) • Canada
- Red Cliff (Chi bi) • China
- The White Ribbon (Das weiße Band) • Germany
- Winter in Wartime (Oorlogswinter) • Netherlands

=== Best Original Score ===
Up in the Air – Rolfe Kent

- Amelia – Gabriel Yared
- The Informant! – Marvin Hamlisch
- Public Enemies – Elliot Goldenthal
- Up – Michael Giacchino
- Where the Wild Things Are – Carter Burwell and Karen O

=== Best Original Song ===
"The Weary Kind" by Ryan Bingham and T Bone Burnett from Crazy Heart

- "Almost There" by Randy Newman from The Princess and the Frog
- "Cinema Italiano" by Maury Yeston from Nine
- "Down in New Orleans" by Randy Newman from The Princess and the Frog
- "I Can See in Color" by Mary J. Blige from Precious
- "We Are the Children of the World" by Terry Gilliam from The Imaginarium of Doctor Parnassus

=== Best Screenplay – Adapted ===
Geoffrey Fletcher for Precious

- Neill Blomkamp and Terri Tatchell for District 9
- Nora Ephron for Julie & Julia
- Nick Hornby for An Education
- Jason Reitman and Sheldon Turner for Up in the Air

=== Best Screenplay – Original ===
Scott Neustadter and Michael H. Weber for (500) Days of Summer

- Mark Boal for The Hurt Locker
- Jane Campion for Bright Star
- Joel Coen and Ethan Coen for A Serious Man
- Pete Docter and Bob Peterson for Up

=== Best Sound ===
2012

- It Might Get Loud
- Nine
- Red Cliff
- Terminator Salvation
- Transformers: Revenge of the Fallen

=== Best Supporting Actor ===
Christoph Waltz for Inglourious Basterds

- Woody Harrelson for The Messenger
- James McAvoy for The Last Station
- Alfred Molina for An Education
- Timothy Spall for The Damned United

=== Best Supporting Actress ===
Mo'Nique for Precious

- Emily Blunt for Sunshine Cleaning
- Penélope Cruz for Nine
- Anna Kendrick for Up in the Air
- Mozhan Marnò for The Stoning of Soraya M.

=== Best Visual Effects ===
2012

- District 9
- Fantastic Mr. Fox
- The Imaginarium of Doctor Parnassus
- Red Cliff
- Transformers: Revenge of the Fallen

=== Outstanding Motion Picture Ensemble ===
Nine

== Television winners and nominees ==
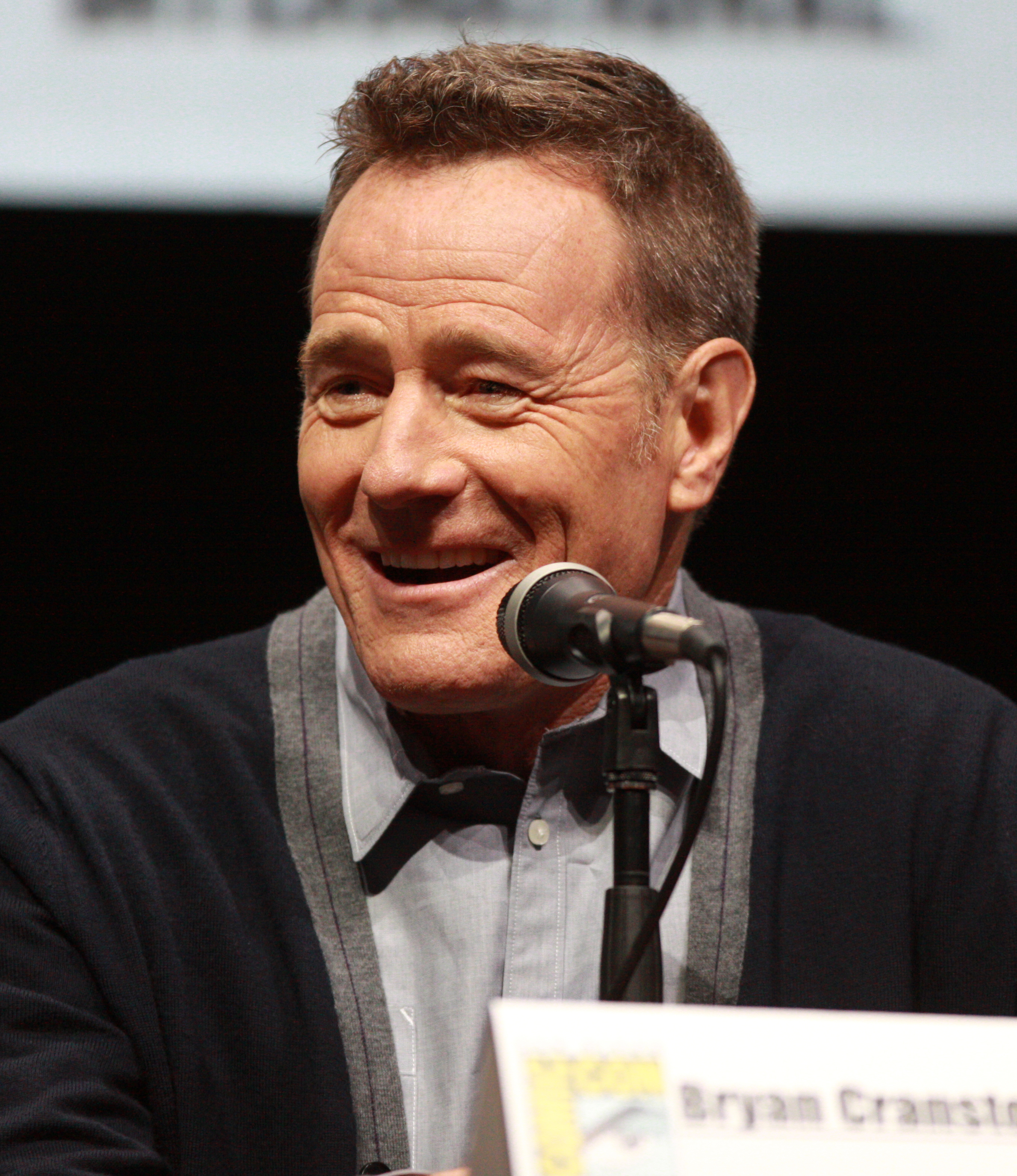
Bryan Cranston, Best Actor in a Drama Series winner

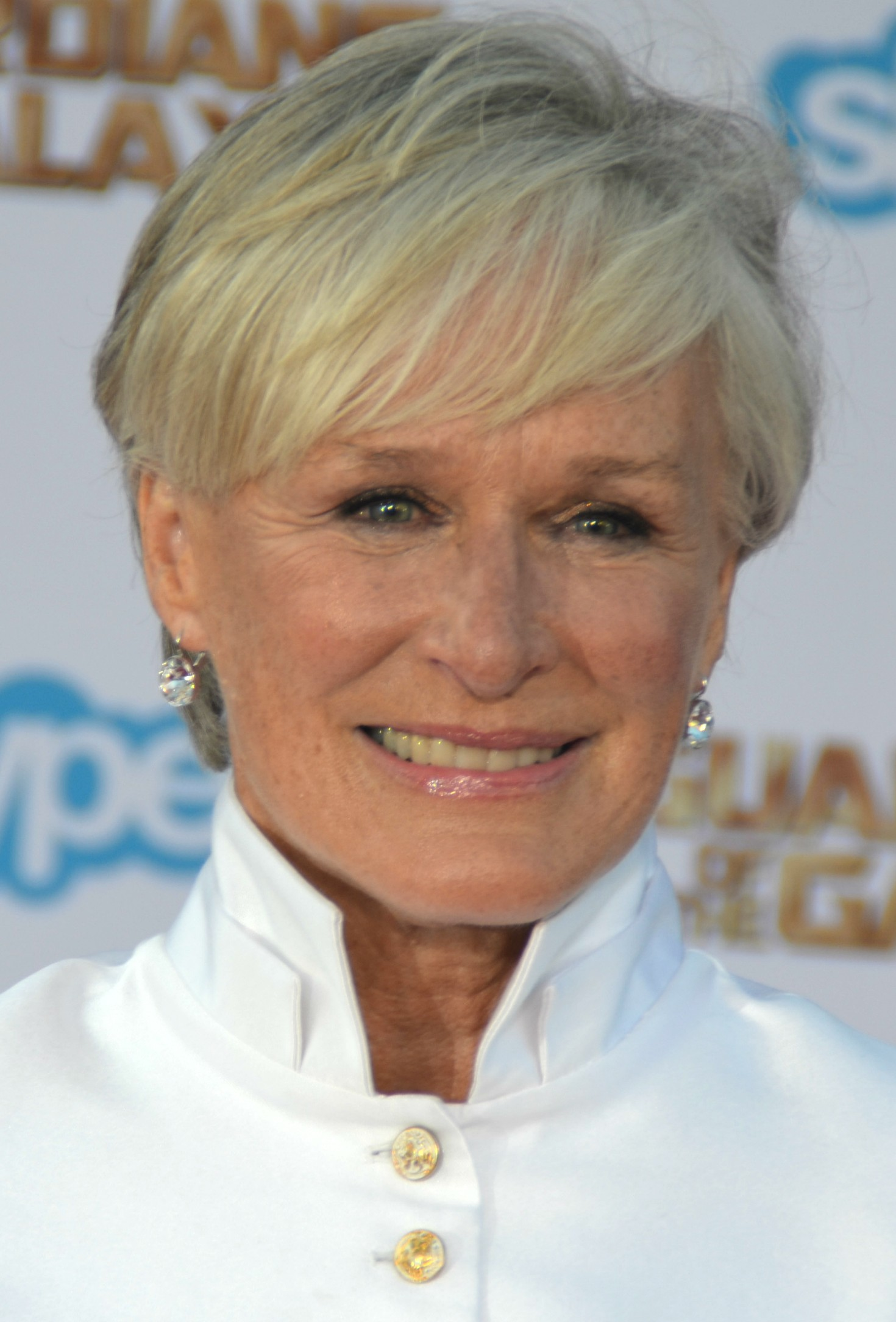
Glenn Close, Best Actress in a Drama Series winner

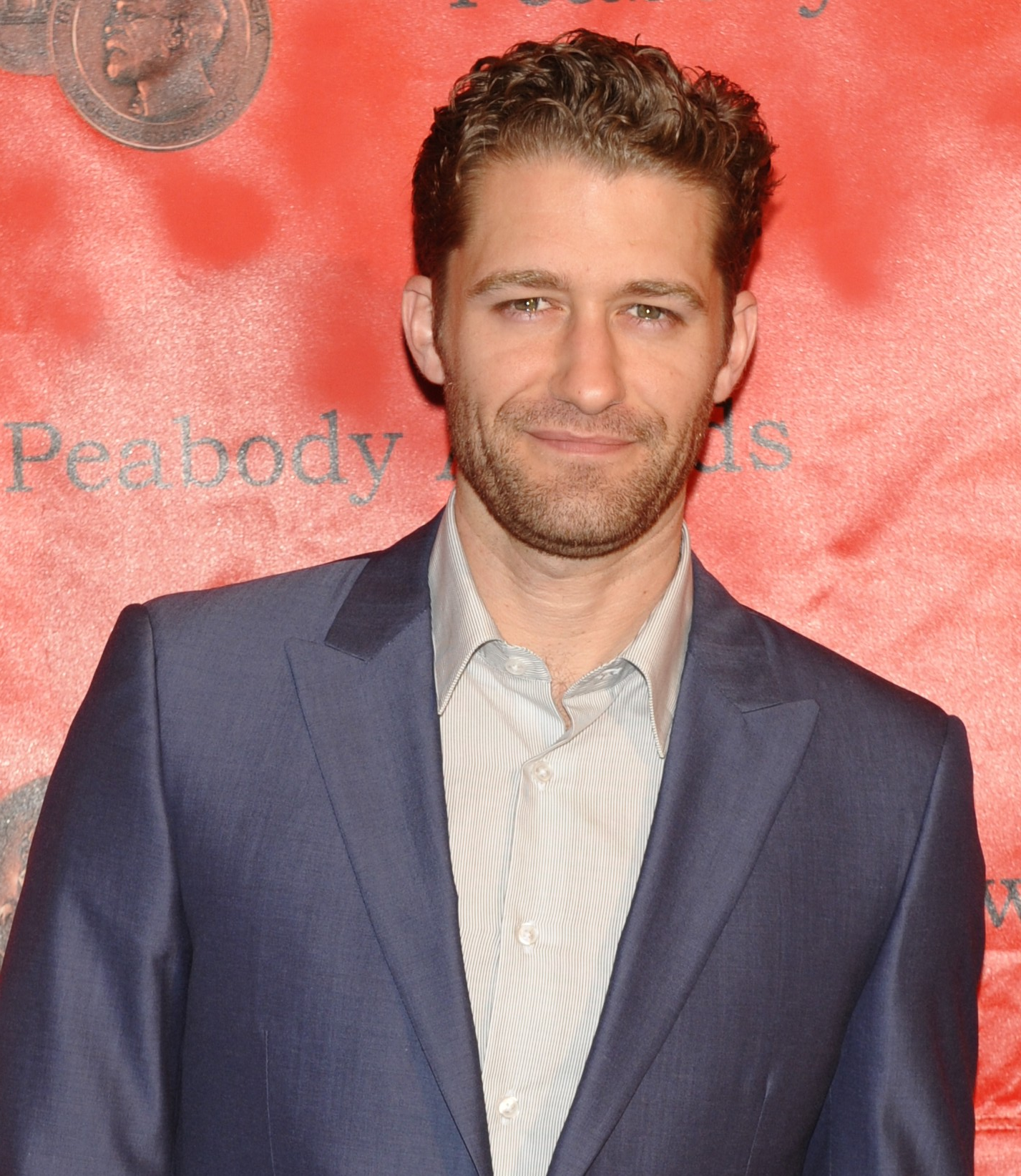
Matthew Morrison, Best Actor in a Comedy or Musical Series winner

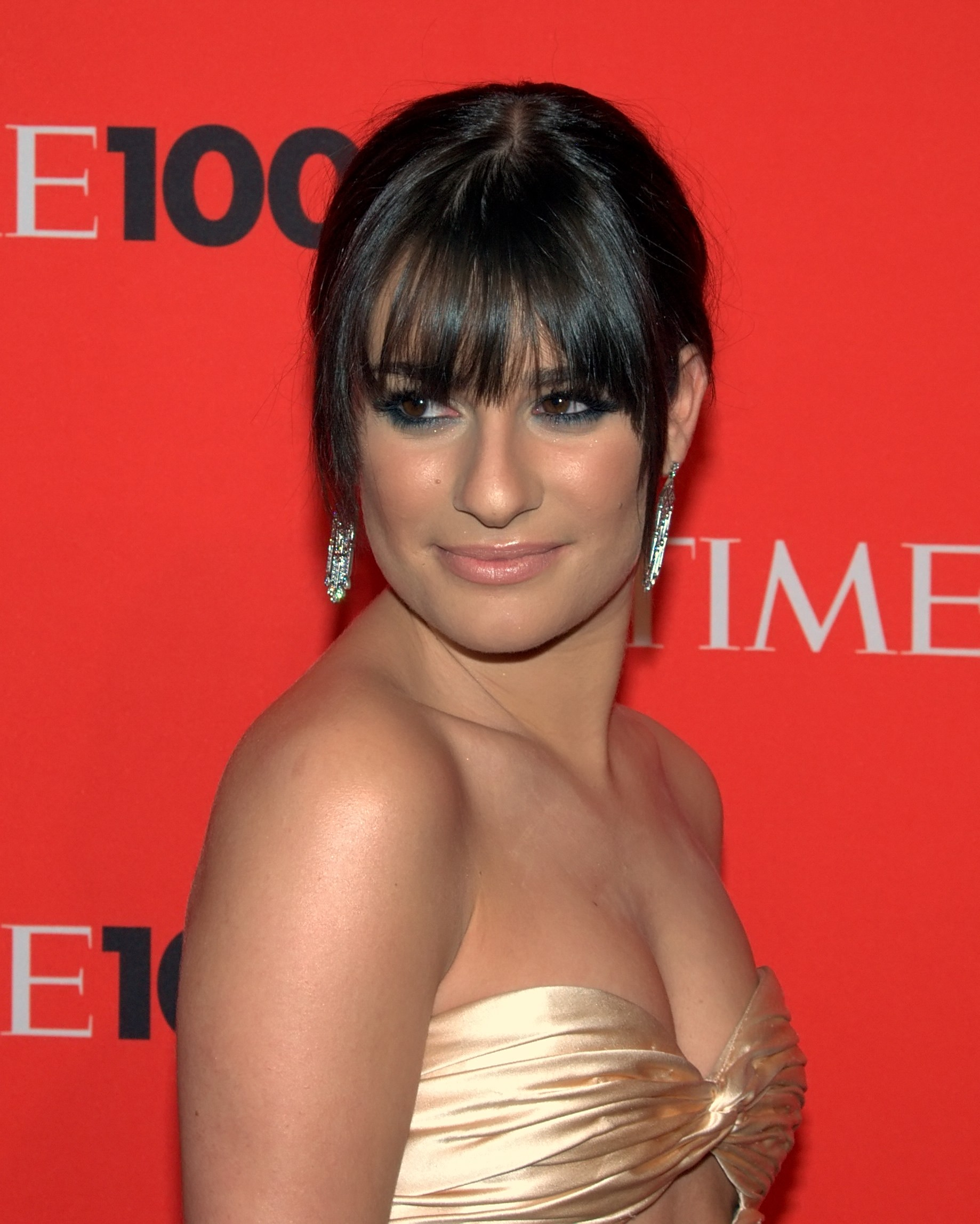
Lea Michele, Best Actress in a Comedy or Musical Series winner

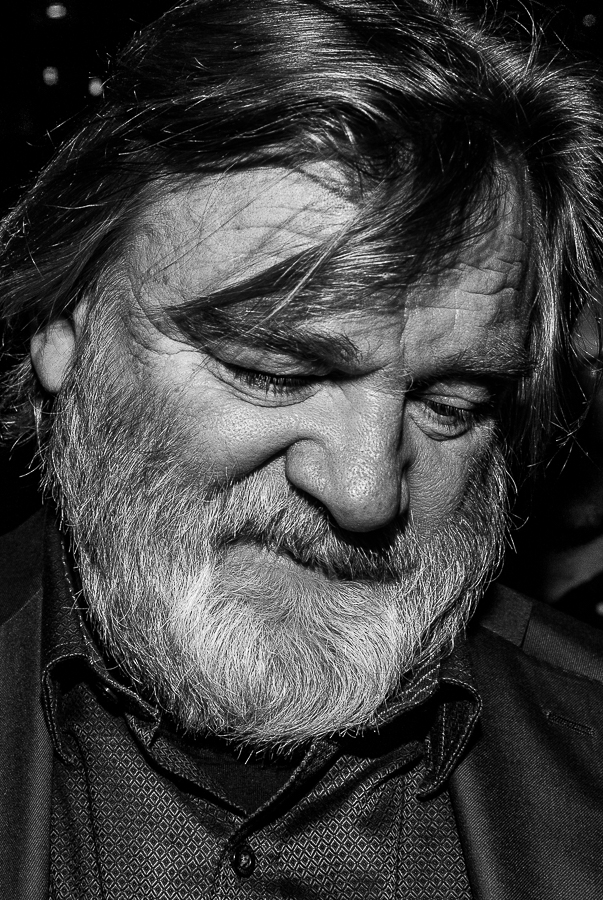
Brendan Gleeson, Best Actor in a Miniseries or Television Film winner

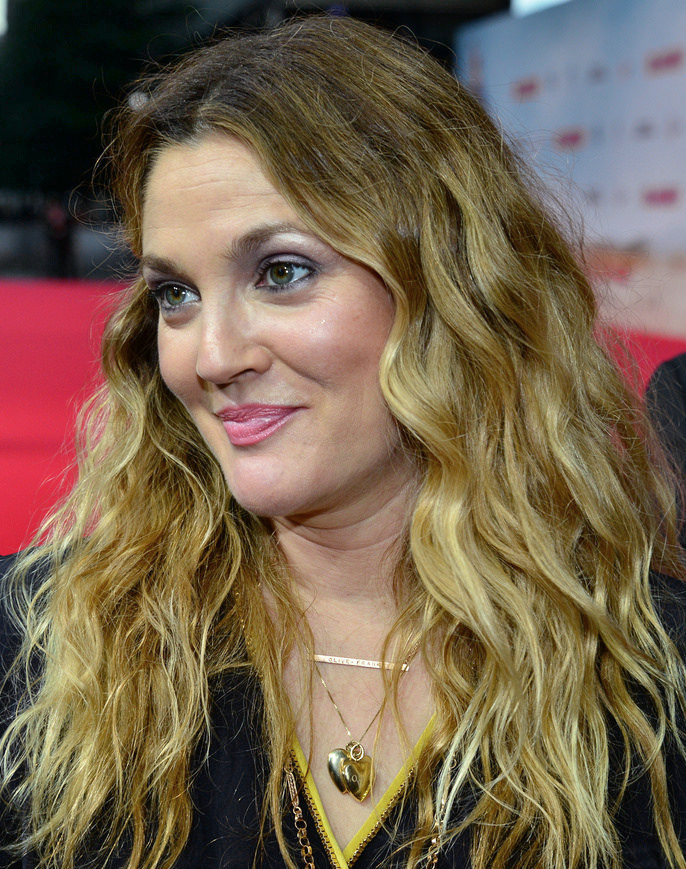
Drew Barrymore, Best Actress in a Miniseries or Television Film winner

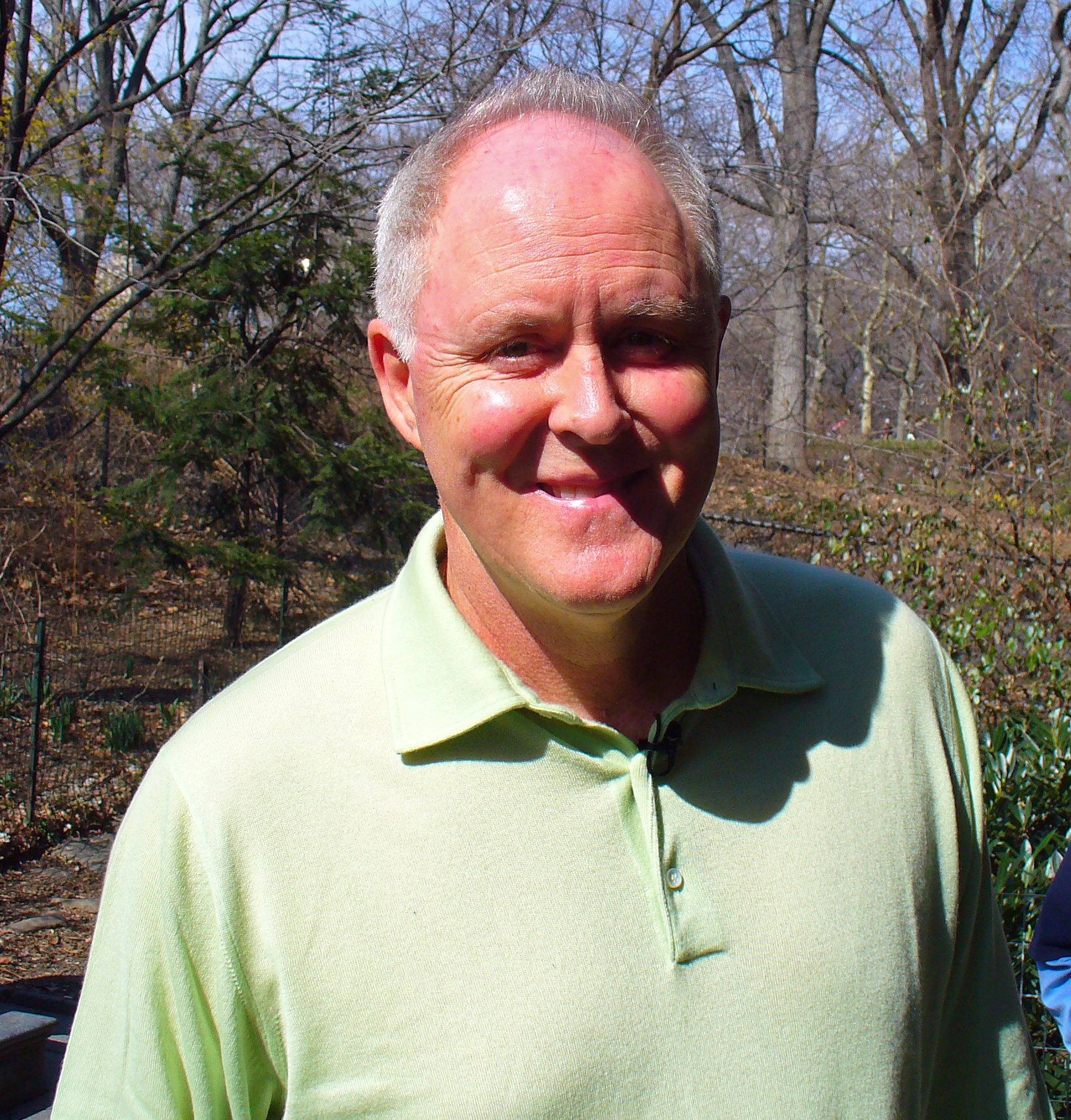
John Lithgow, Best Supporting Actor in a Series, Miniseries, or Television Film winner

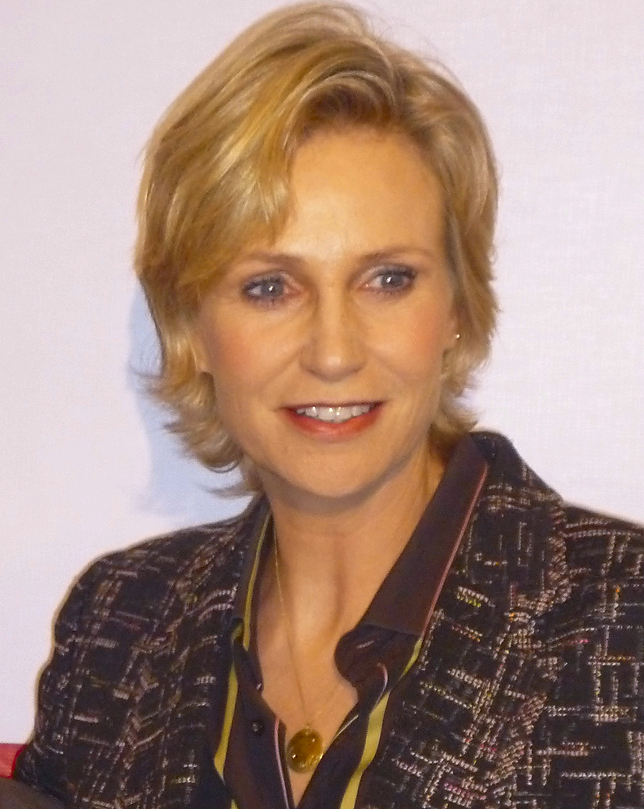
Jane Lynch, Best Supporting Actress in a Series, Miniseries, or Television Film winner

=== Best Actor – Drama Series ===
Bryan Cranston – Breaking Bad

- Gabriel Byrne – In Treatment
- Nathan Fillion – Castle
- Jon Hamm – Mad Men
- Lucian Msamati – The No. 1 Ladies' Detective Agency
- Bill Paxton – Big Love

=== Best Actor – Musical or Comedy Series ===
Matthew Morrison – Glee

- Alec Baldwin – 30 Rock
- Jemaine Clement – Flight of the Conchords
- Stephen Colbert – The Colbert Report
- Danny McBride – Eastbound & Down
- Jim Parsons – The Big Bang Theory

=== Best Actor – Miniseries or Television Film ===
Brendan Gleeson – Into the Storm

- Kevin Bacon – Taking Chance
- Kenneth Branagh – Wallander
- William Hurt – Endgame
- Jeremy Irons – Georgia O'Keeffe
- Ian McKellen – The Prisoner

=== Best Actress – Drama Series ===
Glenn Close – Damages

- Stana Katic – Castle
- Julianna Margulies – The Good Wife
- Elisabeth Moss – Mad Men
- Jill Scott – The No. 1 Ladies' Detective Agency

=== Best Actress – Musical or Comedy Series ===
Lea Michele – Glee

- Julie Bowen – Modern Family
- Toni Collette – United States of Tara
- Brooke Elliott – Drop Dead Diva
- Edie Falco – Nurse Jackie
- Tina Fey – 30 Rock
- Mary-Louise Parker – Weeds

=== Best Actress – Miniseries or Television Film ===
Drew Barrymore – Grey Gardens

- Lauren Ambrose – Loving Leah
- Judy Davis – Diamonds
- Jessica Lange – Grey Gardens
- Janet McTeer – Into the Storm
- Sigourney Weaver – Prayers for Bobby

=== Best Miniseries ===
Little Dorrit

- Collision
- Diamonds
- The Prisoner
- Wallander

=== Best Series – Drama ===
Breaking Bad

- Big Love
- Damages
- The Good Wife
- In Treatment
- Mad Men

=== Best Series – Musical or Comedy ===
Glee

- 30 Rock
- The Big Bang Theory
- Flight of the Conchords
- How I Met Your Mother
- Weeds

=== Best Supporting Actor – Series, Miniseries, or Television Film ===
John Lithgow – Dexter

- Chris Colfer – Glee
- Tom Courtenay – Little Dorrit
- Neil Patrick Harris – How I Met Your Mother
- John Noble – Fringe
- Harry Dean Stanton – Big Love

=== Best Supporting Actress – Series, Miniseries, or Television Film ===
Jane Lynch – Glee

- Cherry Jones – 24
- Judy Parfitt – Little Dorrit
- Anika Noni Rose – The No. 1 Ladies' Detective Agency
- Chloë Sevigny – Big Love
- Vanessa Williams – Ugly Betty

=== Best Television Film ===
Grey Gardens

- The Courageous Heart of Irena Sendler
- Endgame
- Into the Storm
- Loving Leah
- Taking Chance

=== Outstanding Television Ensemble ===
True Blood

== New Media winners and nominees ==
=== Best Classic DVD ===
North by Northwest (50th Anniversary Edition)

- Gone with the Wind (Two-Disc 70th Anniversary Edition)
- Paul Newman – The Tribute Collection (Butch Cassidy and the Sundance Kid, Exodus, From the Terrace, Hemingway's Adventures of a Young Man, The Hustler, The Long, Hot Summer, Rally Round the Flag, Boys!, The Towering Inferno, The Verdict, and What a Way to Go!)
- To Catch a Thief (The Centennial Collection)
- The Wizard of Oz (Two-Disc 70th Anniversary Edition)
- Yentl (Two-Disc Director's Extended Edition)

=== Best Documentary DVD ===
Every Little Step

- Days That Shook the World (The Complete Second Season)
- Food, Inc.
- Moving Midway
- Religulous
- Woodstock: 3 Days of Peace & Music – The Director's Cut (Two-Disc 40th Anniversary Edition)

=== Best DVD Extras ===
Yentl (Two-Disc Director's Extended Edition)

- Across the Universe
- The Big Lebowski (10th Anniversary Edition)
- Dexter (The Complete Third Season)
- Hogan's Heroes (The Komplete Series – Kommandant's Kollection)
- Primal Fear (Hard Evidence Edition)
- Up (Two-Disc Deluxe Edition)

=== Best DVD Release of a TV Show ===
True Blood (The Complete First Season)

- Ally McBeal (The Complete Series)
- Dollhouse (Season 1)
- Hogan's Heroes (The Komplete Series – Kommandant's Kollection)
- Project Runway (Season 5)
- Sons of Anarchy (Season One)

=== Best Overall Blu-Ray ===
Star Trek (3-Disc Digital Copy Special Edition)

- Rocky: The Undisputed Collection (Rocky, Rocky II, Rocky III, Rocky IV, Rocky V, and Rocky Balboa)
- Say Anything... (20th Anniversary Edition)
- South Pacific (50th Anniversary Edition)
- Up (4-Disc Combo Pack)
- The Wizard of Oz (70th Anniversary Ultimate Collector's Edition)

=== Best Overall DVD ===
Gone with the Wind (Two-Disc 70th Anniversary Edition)

- An American Werewolf in London (Special Edition)
- The Reader
- Slumdog Millionaire
- Up (Two-Disc Deluxe Edition)
- The Wizard of Oz (70th Anniversary Ultimate Collector's Edition)

=== Best Youth DVD ===
The Wizard of Oz (Two-Disc 70th Anniversary Edition)

- Bolt (Deluxe DVD Edition)
- Ice Age: Dawn of the Dinosaurs (Double DVD Pack)
- Peanuts: 1960's Collection (A Charlie Brown Christmas, Charlie Brown's All Stars!, He's Your Dog, Charlie Brown, It's the Great Pumpkin, Charlie Brown, It Was a Short Summer, Charlie Brown, and You're in Love, Charlie Brown)
- Sesame Street (40 Years of Sunny Days)
- Up (Two-Disc Deluxe Edition)

== Awards breakdown ==
=== Film ===
Winners:

4 / 5 The Hurt Locker: Best Actor – Drama / Best Director / Best Editing / Best Film – Drama
3 / 11 Nine: Best Cinematography / Best Film – Musical or Comedy / Outstanding Motion Picture Ensemble
2 / 4 2012: Best Sound / Best Visual Effects
2 / 5 Precious: Best Screenplay – Adapted / Best Supporting Actress
1 / 1 Every Little Step: Best Documentary Film
1 / 2 (500) Days of Summer: Best Screenplay – Original
1 / 2 Broken Embraces: Best Foreign Language Film
1 / 2 Crazy Heart: Best Original Song
1 / 2 Fantastic Mr. Fox: Best Animated or Mixed Media Film
1 / 2 Inglourious Basterds: Best Supporting Actor
1 / 3 Julie & Julia: Best Actress – Musical or Comedy
1 / 3 A Single Man: Best Art Direction and Production Design
1 / 3 The Stoning of Soraya M.: Best Actress – Drama
1 / 4 The Imaginarium of Doctor Parnassus: Best Costume Design
1 / 4 A Serious Man: Best Actor – Musical or Comedy
1 / 5 Up in the Air: Best Original Score

Losers:

0 / 6 Red Cliff
0 / 5 An Education
0 / 4 Bright Star, District 9, It Might Get Loud, Public Enemies
0 / 3 The Informant!, The Princess and the Frog, Up
0 / 2 The Damned United, The Maid, The Messenger, Transformers: Revenge of the Fallen, The Young Victoria, Where the Wild Things Are

=== Television ===
Winners:

4 / 5 Glee: Best Actor & Actress – Musical or Comedy Series / Best Series – Musical or Comedy / Best Supporting Actress – Series, Miniseries, or Television Film
2 / 2 Breaking Bad: Best Actor – Drama Series / Best Series – Drama
2 / 3 Grey Gardens: Best Actress – Miniseries or Television Film / Best Television Film
1 / 1 Dexter: Best Supporting Actor – Series, Miniseries, or Television Film
1 / 1 True Blood: Outstanding Television Ensemble
1 / 2 Damages: Best Actress – Drama Series
1 / 3 Little Dorrit: Best Miniseries
1 / 3 Into the Storm: Best Actor – Miniseries or Television Film

Losers:

0 / 4 Big Love
0 / 3 30 Rock, Mad Men, The No. 1 Ladies' Detective Agency
0 / 2 The Big Bang Theory, Castle, Diamonds, Endgame, Flight of the Conchords, The Good Wife, How I Met Your Mother, In Treatment, Loving Leah, The Prisoner, Taking Chance, Wallander, Weeds
