= The Weary Kind =

Song by Ryan Bingham

from the album Crazy Heart: Original Motion Picture Soundtrack
- Released: 2009
- Genre: Country
- Length: 0:04:18
- Label: New West Records
- Songwriter: Ryan Bingham; T Bone Burnett

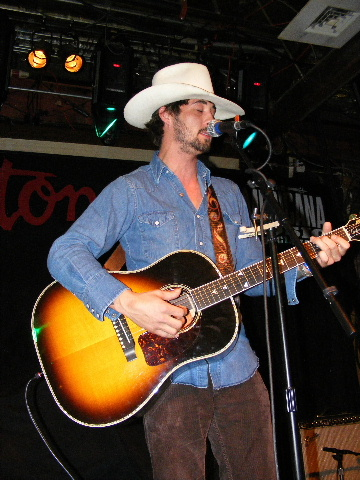
Bingham performing in Texas, 2008

"The Weary Kind" (full title "The Weary Kind (Theme from Crazy Heart)") is a country song written by Ryan Bingham and T Bone Burnett for the film Crazy Heart, a 2009 film directed by Scott Cooper starring Jeff Bridges and Maggie Gyllenhaal. Colin Farrell and Bridges perform renditions of the song in the film. Bingham and his Dead Horses serve as Bridges' backing band in the film.

The official version on the soundtrack album Crazy Heart: Original Motion Picture Soundtrack is performed by Ryan Bingham. Jeff Bridges sang a live version during his interview with Peter Travers on ABC News Now. The song was later included as the last track on Bingham's 2010 album Junky Star.

== Awards and nominations ==
Awards
Award	Date of ceremony	Category	Result
Satellite Award	December 20, 2009	Best Original Song	Won
Critics' Choice Movie Award	January 15, 2010	Best Song	Won
Golden Globe Award	January 17, 2010	Best Original Song	Won
Academy Award	March 7, 2010	Best Original Song	Won
Grammy Award	February 13, 2011	Best Song Written for a Motion Picture, Television or Other Visual Media	Won

== Chart performance ==
Chart	Position
US Billboard Bubbling Under Hot 100 Singles	16
US Billboard Country Digital Song Sales	11
US Billboard Top Heatseekers Songs	15
