= Fear and Saturday Night =

Fear And Saturday Night

Studio album by Ryan Bingham
- Released: January 20, 2015
- Genre: Americana
- Label: Axster Bingham Records
- Producer: Ryan Bingham, Jim Scott

Ryan Bingham chronology
Tomorrowland (2012)	Fear And Saturday Night (2015)	American Love Song (2019)

Singles from Fear and Saturday Night
- 1. "Broken Heart Tattoos" Released: October 23, 2014

Fear And Saturday Night is the fifth studio album by Americana singer-songwriter Ryan Bingham, released on January 20, 2015. The album was recorded with producer Jim Scott and will be self-released through Bingham's independent record label Axster Bingham Records.

Professional ratings
Review scores
Source	Rating
The Upcoming	4/5 stars

== Composition ==
According to Rolling Stone Country, "Bingham wrote most of the album's 12 tracks alone in an airstream trailer, parked in the mountains of California without electricity or cell phones. The seclusion gave him creative clarity that resulted in songs inspired by an unstable childhood, and by the deaths of his mother to alcoholism and father to suicide."

== Production ==
The album was recorded with a new band recruited from members of Rose Hill Drive, and co-produced with Jim Scott, known for engineering Tom Petty's 1995 album Wildflowers, mixing Foo Fighters' 2002 album One by One, and co-producing Wilco's self-titled Wilco (The Album) in 2009.

== Track listing ==
All tracks are written by Ryan Bingham.

No.	Title	Length
1.	"Nobody Knows My Trouble"	4:16
2.	"Broken Heart Tattoos"	4:00
3.	"Top Shelf Drug"	3:28
4.	"Island in the Sky"	4:33
5.	"Adventures of You and Me"	4:11
6.	"Fear and Saturday Night"	4:23
7.	"My Diamond Is Too Rough"	5:37
8.	"Radio"	4:36
9.	"Snow Falls in June"	5:01
10.	"Darlin"	4:57
11.	"Hands of Time"	3:09
12.	"Gun Fightin Man"	4:06

== Charts ==
Chart (2015)	Peak position
US Billboard 200	47
US Top Digital Albums (Billboard)	21
US Folk Albums (Billboard)	3
US Top Independent Albums (Billboard)	7
US Top Rock Albums (Billboard)	9
US Top Tastemaker Albums (Billboard)	10
US Top Album Sales (Billboard)	29
