= Ryan Bingham =

American country musician

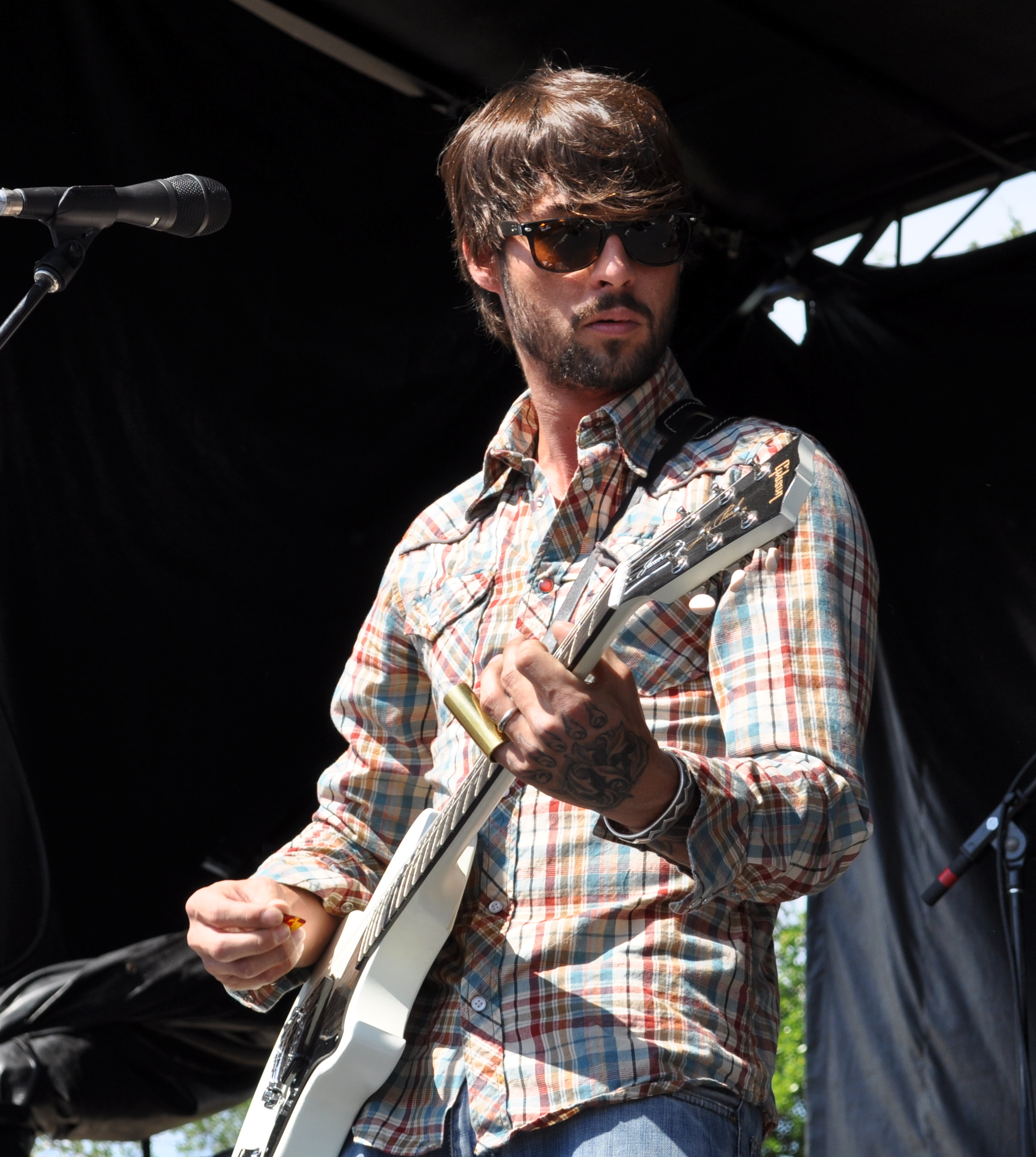
- Bingham performing in 2010
- Born: George Ryan Bingham; March 31, 1981 (age 45); Hobbs, New Mexico, U.S.
- Education: Westfield High School
- Occupations: Singer; songwriter; musician; actor
- Years active: 2007–present
- Spouse: Anna Axster (m. 2009; div. 2021) Hassie Harrison (m. 2023)
- Children: 3
- Awards: Full list
- Musical career
- Origin: Austin, Texas, U.S.
- Genres: Americana; roots rock
- Instruments: Vocals; guitar; harmonica; keyboard
- Labels: Lost Highway; Axster Bingham
- Formerly of: Ryan Bingham and the Dead Horses
- Website: ryanbingham.com

George Ryan Bingham (born March 31, 1981) is an American singer, actor, songwriter, and guitarist whose music spans multiple genres. He is currently based out of Dallas. As of 2019, Bingham has released six studio albums and one live album, the last four of which were released under his own label, Axster Bingham Records.

Originally from Hobbs, New Mexico, Bingham grew up across the southwestern United States. He joined the rodeo circuit as a bull rider in his teens. Bingham learned music on a guitar gifted to him by his mother at age 16, initially playing after rodeos for his friends. Eventually, he began playing in small bars and honky tonks across the West, landing him in Los Angeles. Bingham signed his first record deal with Lost Highway Records (UMG) in 2007.

After receiving critical acclaim for his first two studio releases on Lost Highway Records, 2007's Mescalito and 2009's Roadhouse Sun, Bingham went on to collaborate with Grammy-winning producer T Bone Burnett on the soundtrack for the acclaimed 2009 film Crazy Heart, including notably cowriting and performing the film's award-winning theme song, "The Weary Kind". The title track earned Bingham an Academy Award, Golden Globe Award, and Critics' Choice Award for "Best Song" in 2010, as well as a Grammy Award for "Best Song Written for a Motion Picture, Television or Other Visual Media" in 2011. The Americana Music Association also honored Bingham with the organization's top award in 2010 as "Artist of the Year".

Bingham's most recent album, American Love Song, was released on February 15, 2019. A ballad from that album, "Wolves", was inspired in part by the March For Our Lives students who were dealing with grown men and women questioning their integrity on social media. The song was also featured on the TV series Yellowstone. Bingham sang "Wolves" as the series' character, Walker, whom he plays on the show.

In April 2019, Bingham partnered with Live Nation to launch his own music festival, The Western. The inaugural event took place over two days in Luckenbach, Texas.

== Early life ==
Bingham was born in Hobbs, New Mexico. His family relocated to the Midland–Odessa area of West Texas, before eventually moving to Houston. He attended high school primarily in Houston at Westfield High School.

Bingham's mother purchased his first guitar when he was 16 years old. Although he was fascinated by music, he left his guitar dormant in his closet. Roughly a year later, Bingham hitchhiked back west to Laredo, Texas, in hopes of landing a job with his father, carrying the guitar with him on the trip. Bingham's father enjoyed having neighbors over on their porch to drink beer, and one of them taught him a classical Mariachi song called "La Malaguena" in segments. Though he loved playing the song, it was the only one he would learn during his time in Laredo.

He relocated to Stephenville, Texas. There, he began learning more music while also riding on the rodeo team at Tarleton State University. It was in Stephenville that he would write arguably his most well-known hit "Southside of Heaven" in a trailer house. He also began to play local gigs there, namely a local golf course and a few small bars.

While in Stephenville, Bingham had a friend who caught wind of a job in Paris, France, with the Wild West Show at the Disney Resort. He bought a one-way ticket with $100 in his pocket. Upon arrival, he was informed that the manager with whom he had a mutual friend was no longer with the company, and he found himself stranded with his guitar and old rigging bag from his rodeo days. Luckily, he found some friends-of-friends within the Disney programs and began playing music in local parks for tips.

Eventually, he saved enough money to get back to Texas and moved in with a rodeo buddy near Fort Worth. His friend had a brother (Matthew "Papa" Smith) who cut hair during the day and played drums as a hobby. After an introduction and impromptu gig at an empty bar in Fort Worth, he and Papa would go on to be the founding members of Ryan Bingham and the Dead Horses. Marc Ford of the Black Crowes was one of the few people in the bar that night. He approached Bingham after the gig with an offer to record an album.

== Career ==
After issuing self-released "Wishbone Saloon" and "Dead Horses", the latter distributed by Lone Star Music, Bingham was signed to Lost Highway Records, which issued his first major label debut with Mescalito on October 2, 2007, produced by former Black Crowes guitarist Marc Ford. Texas Music Magazine has opined that Bingham "talks and sings with a whiskey-and-cigarette throat that screams hard living. Hard in a way that can make a 29-year-old sound like a 50-year-old Tom Waits." Bingham spent several years on the rodeo circuit. He began bull riding in his late teens.

Bingham's former band, The Dead Horses, was composed of Matthew "Papa" Smith (drums), Corby Schaub (guitar and mandolin) and Marc Ford's son Elijah (bass). The bass player on Mescalito was Jeb Venable (a.k.a. Jeb Stuart), with Joe Allen credited as well, plus a contribution from John Bazz on upright bass. Bingham appeared with the Drive-by Truckers on Austin City Limits in October 2007. The first single from Mescalito, titled "Southside of Heaven", was released on November 30, 2007. The second single was entitled "Bread and Water".

On June 2, 2009, Ryan Bingham and The Dead Horses released their second studio album titled Roadhouse Sun via Lost Highway Records. It was once again produced by Marc Ford.

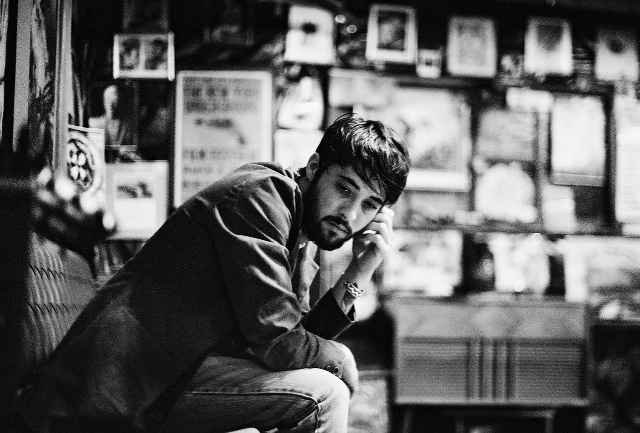
Ryan Bingham from his 2009 release, Roadhouse Sun

Bingham performed two songs for the soundtrack of the movie Crazy Heart, including "I Don't Know" and the theme song, "The Weary Kind". The song was co-written by Bingham and producer, T Bone Burnett. Bingham also played a small role in the film. On January 17, 2010, Bingham was awarded the Golden Globe for Best Original Song for "The Weary Kind". The song also won the 2010 Academy Award for Best Original Song, the 2010 Grammy award for Best Song Written for a Motion Picture, Television or Other Visual Media, as well as Song of the Year at the 9th Annual Americana Music Association awards.

Bingham rejoined with his band the Dead Horses to release their third studio album, Junky Star, on August 31, 2010. The album debuted in the Top 20 on the Billboard 200 Chart & in the Top 10 on the Billboard Rock Album Chart, making Junky Star Bingham's highest charting and most successful release to date.

In 2012, Bingham parted ways with the Dead Horses and record label Lost Highway Records to release his fourth studio album, Tomorrowland, on his own Axster Bingham Records label. Bingham co-produced the album with musician/producer Justin Stanley. The first single released from Tomorrowland was "Heart of Rhythm". Both the single and the official lyric video debuted on Americansongwriter.com on July 30, 2012. Bingham's second Tomorrowland single "Guess Who's Knockin" debuted on rollingstone.com on September 6, 2012. The official music video for "Guess Who's Knocking" premiered on pastmagazine.com October 4, 2012.

In 2013, Bingham's song "For Anyone's Sake" appeared in the closing credits of the feature film Joe, starring Nicolas Cage. Bingham wrote the song for the film, and it was released as part of the film's original soundtrack in April 2014. In the same year, Bingham also wrote and recorded "Until I'm One With You", the theme song for FX TV drama series The Bridge. The song is Bingham's first screen track since his Academy Award win for best theme song in 2010. "Until I'm One with You" was released as a digital single on Bingham's own Axster Bingham Records label on June 25, 2013.

In 2014, Bingham starred opposite Imogen Poots in the independent film A Country Called Home, directed and co-written by his wife, Anna Axster. Bingham also wrote and recorded the film's title track "A Country Called Home". The song was released digitally through Bingham's own label, Axster Bingham Records, on May 6, 2016.

Bingham's fifth studio album Fear and Saturday Night was recorded mostly live at Plyrz Studio outside of Los Angeles, California. The album was co-produced by Jim Scott and released through Axster Bingham Records on January 20, 2015. The album's first single "Radio" was released on December 9, 2014. In a 2016 interview with Rolling Stone magazine, Bingham shared, "'Radio' is a song I wrote about the thoughts, memories, and emotions that roll through my mind. The radio that's constantly playing in your head, night and day."

On August 6, 2016, Bingham recorded his first live album, Ryan Bingham Live, at Whitewater Amphitheater in New Braunfels, Texas. The album was released on October 21, 2016. The entire Whitewater Amphitheater show was also filmed and streamed live by Amazon Music.

Bingham released a song titled "Back By the River" on The Musical Mojo of Dr. John: A Celebration of Mac and his Music, in 2016.

Starting in 2018, Bingham had a recurring guest role in the contemporary Western television show, Yellowstone, as Walker, an itinerant ranch hand.

In December 2018, Bingham announced that he would be releasing his sixth studio album American Love Song in February 2019.

In March 2020, Bingham began posting various covers and released songs on his Youtube channel in a series known as the Cantina Sessions throughout the COVID-19 pandemic, he continued such until the end of 2020.

In May 2026, Bingham release his seventh studio album, They Call Us The Lucky Ones with the backing band The Texas Gentlemen.

== Reception ==
Bingham has appeared as a guest on Bob Harris's Country Show on the BBC's Radio 2. Daryl Easlea, writing for the BBC's folk and country review, said: "Bingham will be one of the names to drop in 2008, with an album that sounds as if it's been unearthed from 1972."

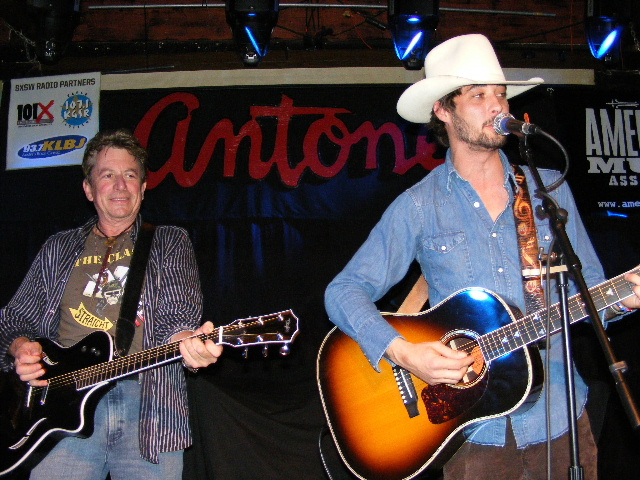
Ryan Bingham & Joe Ely – Antone's during SXSW 2008 – Austin, TX.

Rolling Stone magazine gave Mescalito three out of five stars and wrote that Bingham "earns his sepia-toned album cover with a dusty wood-and-steel sound, and despite being twenty-five, sings like Steve Earle's dad."

PopMatters review of Tomorrowland awarded the album with 8 out of 10 stars. Greg M. Scwartz, writing for PopMatters wrote, that "The one-time pro rodeo rider turned Texas troubadour has blues, country, and Americana influences that are certainly still there. But at his core, Bingham has always been a rock 'n' roller and Tomorrowland features him rocking at his best."

Tomorrowland was also reviewed by Nico Isaac from Paste (magazine). Isaac wrote: "Tomorrowland is like a good, ol' fashioned rock anthem of kiss-my-asschaps autonomy... One thing's for sure Tomorrowland- the album and the red-blooded, rattlesnake-eating rebellious attitude—is no place for the weary kind."

== Personal life ==
Ryan's mother died due to alcohol related causes and his father died by suicide. Bingham's "Never Far Behind" from his Tomorrowland album is about his parents.

He announced at his performance in Austin, Texas, on March 5, 2015, that he and his wife were expecting their first child in the summer of 2015. Bingham's song "Broken Heart Tattoo" from Fear and Saturday Night is a reflection about what he would like to say to his unborn child.

On June 29, 2021, Bingham filed for divorce from his wife, Anna Axster, after 12 years of marriage. In September 2021, it was revealed that the couple's former Topanga Canyon home was sold for $2.45 million. The home was originally purchased by the couple in 2013 for $1.36 million. Bingham and Axster have three children together.

Since April 2023, Bingham and his fellow Yellowstone co-star Hassie Harrison have been in a relationship. They were married on October 7, 2023 at her family estate in Dallas, Texas.

== Discography ==
Ryan Bingham discography
- Studio albums: 6
- Extended plays: 2
- Live albums: 1
- Compilation albums: 7
- Singles: 11
- Music videos: 9

=== Studio albums ===
Title	Album details	Peak chart positions				
Title	Album details	US Country	US	US Folk	US Rock	US Indie
Mescalito	Release date: October 2, 2007; Label: Lost Highway; Formats: LP, CD, music download, streaming	—	—	—	—	—
Roadhouse Sun	Release date: June 2, 2009; Label: Lost Highway; Formats: LP, CD, music download, streaming	17	65	—	—	—
Junky Star	Release date: August 31, 2010; Label: Lost Highway; Formats: LP, CD, music download, streaming	2	19	—	8	—
Tomorrowland	Release date: September 18, 2012; Label: Axster/Bingham; Formats: LP, CD, music download, streaming	7	36	—	16	8
Fear and Saturday Night	Release date: January 20, 2015; Label: Axster/Bingham; Formats: LP, CD, music download, streaming	—	47	3	9	7
American Love Song	Release date: February 15, 2019; Label: Axster Bingham; Formats: LP, CD, music download, streaming	12	124	4	18	4
"—" denotes releases that did not chart

=== Live albums ===
Title	Album details
Ryan Bingham Live	Release date: October 21, 2016; Label: Axster Bingham; Formats: LP, CD, music download, streaming

=== Extended plays ===
Title	Album details	Peak positions
Title	Album details	US Country
iTunes Live: SXSW	Release date: March 18, 2011; Label: Lost Highway Records; Formats: CD, music download	64

Title	Album details	Peak positions
Title	Album details	US Country
Watch Out For The Wolf	Release date: August 11, 2023; Label: Thirty Tigers; Formats: CD, Vinyl, music download	

=== Singles ===
Year	Title	Peak positions		Album
Year	Title	US Country Digital	US Bubbling	Album
2007	"Southside of Heaven"	—	—	Mescalito
2010	"The Weary Kind"	11	16	Crazy Heart (soundtrack)
2010	"Depression"	—	—	Junky Star
2012	"The Wandering"	—	—	Junky Star
2012	"Heart of Rhythm"	—	—	Tomorrowland
2013	"Until I'm One with You"	—	—	—N/a
2014	"Broken Heart Tattoos"	—	—	Fear and Saturday Night
2014	"Radio"	—	—	Fear and Saturday Night
2015	"Hands of Time"	—	—	Fear and Saturday Night
2018	"Wolves"	—	—	American Love Song
2019	"Jingle and Go"	—	—	American Love Song
	"—" denotes releases that did not chart			

=== Other charted songs ===
Year	Title	Peak positions	Album
Year	Title	US Country Digital	Album
2010	"Hallelujah"	9	Junky Star

=== Music videos ===
Year	Video	Director
2007	"Southside of Heaven"	Anna Axster
2008	"Bread and Water"	Anna Axster
2009	"Country Roads"	Anna Axster
2009	"Snake Eyes"	Anna Axster
2010	"The Weary Kind"	Danny Clinch
2012	"Heart of Rhythm"	Anna Axster
2012	"Guess Who's Knocking"	Anna Axster
2015	"Radio"	Anna Axster
2018	"Wolves"	Ryan Bingham

== Filmography ==
=== Film ===
For film roles, he is credited as Ryan Bingham unless otherwise noted.

Year	Title	Role	Notes
2009	Crazy Heart	Tony	
2015	Jackie & Ryan	Cowboy's Brother	
2015	A Country Called Home	Jack	credited as composer and actor
2016	Ryan Bingham Live	Himself	TV special
2017	Hostiles	Sergeant Malloy	
2017	The Life & Songs of Kris Kristofferson	Himself	TV special
2017	Outlaw: Celebrating the Music of Waylon Jennings	Himself	TV special

=== Television ===
Year	Title	Role	Notes
2008–2012	The Tonight Show with Jay Leno	Himself	4 episodes; Guest
2009–2010	Late Show with David Letterman	Himself	3 episodes; Guest
2012	Good Morning America	Himself	1 episode; musical guest
2018–2024	Yellowstone	Walker	23 episodes

== Awards and nominations ==
=== Academy Awards ===
Year	Category	Nominated work	Result
2010	Best Original Song	"The Weary Kind" (Shared with T Bone Burnett)	Won

=== Americana Music Association ===
Year	Category	Nominated work	Result
2010	Artist of the Year	Himself	Won

=== Critics' Choice Movie Awards ===
Year	Category	Nominated work	Result
2010	Best Song	"The Weary Kind" (Shared with T Bone Burnett)	Won

=== Golden Globe Awards ===
Year	Category	Nominated work	Result
2010	Best Original Song	"The Weary Kind" (Shared with T Bone Burnett)	Won

=== Grammy Awards ===
Year	Category	Nominated work	Result
2011	Best Song Written for Visual Media	"The Weary Kind" (Shared with T Bone Burnett)	Won

=== Satellite Awards ===
Year	Category	Nominated work	Result
2009	Best Original Song	"The Weary Kind" (Shared with T Bone Burnett)	Won

=== Screen Actors Guild Awards ===
Year	Category	Nominated work	Result
2021	Outstanding Performance by an Ensemble in a Drama Series	Yellowstone	Nominated

=== World Soundtrack Awards ===
Year	Category	Nominated work	Result
2010	Best Original Song Written Directly for a Film	"The Weary Kind" (Shared with T Bone Burnett)	Won
