= American Love Song =

Studio album by Ryan Bingham
- Released: February 15, 2019
- Genre: Americana/Folk
- Length: 1:06:09
- Label: Axster Bingham
- Producer: Charlie Sexton Ryan Bingham

Ryan Bingham chronology
Fear and Saturday Night (2015)	American Love Song (2019)

Singles from American Love Song
- 1. "Wolves" Released: November 29, 2018; 2. "Jingle and Go" Released: January 8, 2019

Professional ratings
Aggregate scores
Source	Rating
Metacritic	83/100
Review scores
Source	Rating
AllMusic	4/5 stars
American Songwriter	4/5 stars
Paste	7.7/10

American Love Song is the sixth studio album by American singer-songwriter Ryan Bingham. It was released on February 15, 2019 on his own label Axster Bingham Records. The album was co-produced by singer-songwriter Charlie Sexton.

"Wolves" was released as the first single from the album on November 29, 2018. The second single "Jingle and Go" was released on January 8, 2019.

== Reception ==
Stephen Thomas Erlewine of AllMusic described Bingham's work as "his most confident since his brief flirtation with the mainstream at the dawn of the 2010s". Erlewine also mentioned Sexton's work as having "given the album's 15 songs a rough-and-tumble feel suited for backwoods Texas juke joints".

Jim Beviglia from American Songwriter mentions that "American Love Song expertly and movingly shows how the overarching U.S.A. theme can encompass triumph and tragedy from one moment to the next."

American Love Song generally met positive reviews from critics with American Songwriter and Allmusic rating it 4/5 stars and Metacritic giving it a 83/100 rating.

== Track listing ==
All tracks are written by Ryan Bingham.

No.	Title	Producer(s)	Length
1.	"Jingle and Go"	Bingham; Sexton^{[a]}	3:52
2.	"Nothin' Holds Me Down"	Bingham; Sexton^{[a]}	3:24
3.	"Pontiac"	Bingham; Sexton^{[a]}	3:22
4.	"Lover Girl"	Bingham; Sexton^{[a]}	6:25
5.	"Beautiful and Kind"	Bingham; Sexton^{[a]}	3:16
6.	"Situation Station"	Bingham; Sexton^{[a]}	4:27
7.	"Got Damn Blues"	Bingham; Sexton^{[a]}	4:36
8.	"Time for My Mind"	Bingham; Sexton^{[a]}	3:27
9.	"What Would I've Become"	Bingham; Sexton^{[a]}	4:19
10.	"Wolves"	Bingham; Sexton^{[a]}	4:32
11.	"Blue"	Bingham; Sexton^{[a]}	6:02
12.	"Hot House"	Bingham; Sexton^{[a]}	4:35
13.	"Stones"	Bingham; Sexton^{[a]}	6:04
14.	"America"	Bingham; Sexton^{[a]}	3:00
15.	"Blues Lady"	Bingham; Sexton^{[a]}	4:48
Total length:			1:06:09

== Personnel ==
Credits adapted from Tidal

Lead Musician

- Ryan Bingham - vocals (all tracks), guitar (all tracks)
- Charlie Sexton - guitar

Technical

- Charlie Sexton - producer, arranger
- Ryan Bingham - producer, arranger, composer
- Brian Lucey - mastering engineer
- Chris Bell - engineer
- Jacob Skiba - engineer
- Justin Stanley - engineer, mixer
- Kyle Crusham - engineer
- Grant Eppley - assistant engineer
- Joseph Holguin - engineer, assistant engineer

Artwork

- Anna Axster - photography, management
- Geoffrey Hanson - design, art direction

== Charts ==
Chart	Peak position
US Billboard 200	124
US Digital Albums (Billboard)	13
US Americana/Folk Albums (Billboard)	4
US Independent Albums (Billboard)	4
US Top Country Albums (Billboard)	12
US Top Rock Albums (Billboard)	18
US Vinyl Albums (Billboard)	10

== In popular culture ==
The album's main single "Wolves" was inspired in part by the March For Our Lives students who were dealing with grown men and women questioning their integrity on social media. The song was also featured on the hit TV series Yellowstone. Bingham sang "Wolves" as the series' character Walker.
