= Roadhouse Sun =

Studio album by Ryan Bingham & The Dead Horses
- Released: June 2, 2009
- Genre: Roots rock, alternative country
- Length: 51:51
- Label: Lost Highway Records
- Producer: Marc Ford

Ryan Bingham & The Dead Horses chronology
Mescalito (2007)	Roadhouse Sun (2009)	Junky Star (2010)

Professional ratings
Aggregate scores
Source	Rating
Metacritic	76/100
Review scores
Source	Rating
AllMusic	3.5/5 stars

Roadhouse Sun is the second studio album by Ryan Bingham & The Dead Horses. It was released on June 2, 2009, by Lost Highway Records.

== Track listing ==
All tracks are written by Ryan Bingham.

No.	Title	Length
1.	"Day Is Done"	4:25
2.	"Dylan's Hard Rain"	4:33
3.	"Tell My Mother I Miss Her So"	3:45
4.	"Country Roads"	3:47
5.	"Bluebird"	5:03
6.	"Snake Eyes"	4:39
7.	"Endless Ways"	3:55
8.	"Change Is"	7:19
9.	"Rollin Highway Blues"	3:50
10.	"Hey Hey Hurray"	3:13
11.	"Roadhouse Blues"	3:30
12.	"Wishing Well"	3:58
Total length:		51:51

== Personnel ==
- Anthony "Antoine" Arvizu - Percussion, Cymbals, Sound Effects, Tambourine, Producer, Engineer, Drums (Snare), Shaker, Mixing
- Kevin Bartley - Mastering
- Heather Bennett - Assistant Engineer
- Ryan Bingham - Guitar (Acoustic), Guitar (Electric), Harp, Keyboards, Vocals, Vocals (background), Lead, Group Member
- Kim Buie - A&R
- John Dehais - Management
- Elijah Ford - Guitar (12-String), Bass, Piano, Vocals (background)
- Marc Ford - Guitar (Acoustic), Bass, Piano, Bass (Electric), Guitar (Electric), Tambourine, Vocals (background), Guitar (12 String), Producer, Slide Guitar, Shaker, Bass (Acoustic), Mixing, 12-String Bass Guitar, Papoose
- Janice Hudgins - Accordion
- Jeff Lightning - Lewis Assistant Engineer
- Pat Magnarella - Management
- Mike Malone - Piano, Vocals (background)
- Larry Meyers - Violin, Viola
- Karen Naff - Design
- Corby Schaub - Guitar (Acoustic), Dobro, Mandolin, Guitar (Electric), Vocals (background), Slide Guitar, Lap Steel Guitar, Guitar (Resonator), Papoose
- Matt Smith - Drums, Vocals, Vocals (background), Group Member

== Chart performance ==
Chart (2009)	Peak position
U.S. Billboard Top Country Albums	17
U.S. Billboard 200	65

== Music videos ==
"Country Roads". (Directed/ Produced by Anna Axster)
"Snake Eyes". Archived from the original on December 21, 2021.
