= Mescalito (album) =

Studio album by Ryan Bingham
- Released: October 2, 2007
- Genre: Americana
- Length: 1:05:34
- Label: Lost Highway
- Producer: Marc Ford Lucas Hoge

Ryan Bingham chronology
Mescalito (2007)	Roadhouse Sun (2009)

Mescalito is the first studio album by American country rock singer/songwriter Ryan Bingham, released in 2007 through Lost Highway Records and produced by Marc Ford.

== Production ==
The album was released after three self-produced albums by Bingham and his band, the Dead Horses. Some of the tracks in Mescalito, such as "South Side of Heaven" (the main single from the album) and "Long Way From Georgia" were taken from the Dead Horses albums (specifically, from Wishbone Saloon). The album encompasses several traditional American and Mexican styles, including bluegrass, country rock, southern rock, blues, americana and mariachi ("Boracho Station").

Mescalito was produced by guitarist Marc Ford (of Black Crowes fame) and features several prominent artists of the country and southern rock scene, such as Terry Allen (who makes a cameo appearance in "Ghost of Travelin' Jones"), Joe Ely, and Marc Ford himself, who plays electric guitar in "The Other Side" and "Bread and Water" and slide guitar in "Hard Times". A different version of "The Other Side" was also included in Marc Ford's album Weary and Wired.

== Reception ==
Professional ratings
Review scores
Source	Rating
Allmusic	3/5 stars

The album was generally well received by critics, who praised Bingham's songwriting as well as the expressiveness of his voice, that was compared to those of Tom Waits and Steve Earle, although some described Bingham's style as too manieristic and monotonous. Besides Earle and Allen, Rolling Stones, John Mellencamp, Bruce Springsteen and Joe Strummer have been cited as obvious influences in Bingham's work.

The main single "Southside of Heaven" was well received commercially, and was included in the score of an episode of the E.R. TV series.

== Track listing ==
1. "Southside of Heaven" – 6:19
2. "The Other Side" – 2:11
3. "Bread and Water" – 4:08
4. "Don't Wait For Me" – 4:56
5. "Boracho Station" – 2:03
6. "Sunshine" – 4:20
7. "Ghost of Travelin' Jones" – 4:09
8. "Hard Times" – 4:38
9. "Dollar a Day" – 2:11
10. "Take It Easy Mama" – 3:03
11. "Long Way From Georgia" – 3:54
12. "Ever Wonder Why" - 4:59
13. "Sunrise" - 4:45
14. "For What It's Worth" - 13:58

== Credits ==
- Jeb Venable - Bass
- Bukka Allen - Accordion
- Joe Allen - Bass
- Terry Allen - Piano, Vocals ("Ghost of Travelin' Jones")
- Anthony "Antoine" Arvizu - Tambourine, Producer, Engineer, Mixing
- Kevin Bartley - Mastering
- John Bazz - Bass (Upright)
- Melanie Bellomo - Cover Photo
- Ryan Bingham - Guitar (Acoustic), Harmonica, Vocals, Vocals (background), Handclapping, Slide Guitar, Shaker, Author, Foot Stomping
- Stéphane Bossard - Banjo
- Brent Bowers - Artist Coordination
- Kim Buie - A&R
- Jason Carter - Fiddle
- Boyd Elder - Illustrations
- David Ferguson - Engineer
- Marc Ford - Guitar (Acoustic), Bass, Guitar (Electric), Organ (Hammond), Tambourine, Producer, Slide Guitar, Shaker, Mixing, Lap Steel Guitar, Hi Hat, Papoose
- Jon Gries - Photography
- Lucas Hoge - Producer
- Coy Koehler - Photography
- David Krepinevich - Assistant Engineer
- Jeff Lightning Lewis - Assistant Engineer
- Rick Lonow - Percussion, Drums
- Mike Malone - Piano, Organ (Hammond)
- Carlton Moody - Producer
- Doug Moreland - Fiddle
- Karen Naff - Design
- Corby Schaub - Mandolin, Guitar (Electric), Vocals (background), Handclapping, Foot Stomping, Kettle Drums
- Matt Smith - Percussion, Drums
- Brian Standefer - Cello, Engineer
- Mike Starr - Fiddle, Slide Guitar

== Music videos ==
"Southside of Heaven". (Directed/ Produced by Anna Axster)
"Bread and Water". (Directed/ Produced by Anna Axster)
