= Thomas Cobb (author) =

American novelist (1947–2025)

Thomas Cobb (July 9, 1947 – November 6, 2025) was an American novelist and author of the 1987 novel Crazy Heart which was adapted into the 2010 Academy Award winning 2009 film Crazy Heart.

== Life and career ==
Raised in Tucson, Arizona, Cobb acquired an MFA from the University of Arizona. He earned a PhD from the University of Houston, where he studied fiction writing with Donald Barthelme. Barthelme also advised him on the writing of Crazy Heart.

Cobb taught at Eastern Arizona College and in the Arizona State Prison System. In 1987, he joined the faculty of Rhode Island College where he was Professor of English and Director of Performing & Fine Arts Commission. He taught fiction writing and literature and was the director of the program from 1987 to 2005. In 2010, he received the Rhode Island College Alumni Faculty Award.

Cobb died on November 6, 2025, at the age of 78.

== Bibliography ==
=== Novels ===
- Crazy Heart (1987)
- Shavetail (2009)
- With Blood in Their Eyes (2012)
- Darkness the Color of Snow (2015)

=== Short stories ===
- Acts of Contrition (2003)
