= Tomorrowland (Ryan Bingham album) =

Studio album by Ryan Bingham
- Released: September 18, 2012
- Recorded: Malibu, CA
- Genre: Americana
- Length: 62:35
- Label: Axster Bingham Records
- Producer: Ryan Bingham, Justin Stanley

Ryan Bingham chronology
Junky Star (2010)	Tomorrowland (2012)	Fear and Saturday Night (2015)

Singles from Tomorrowland
- 1. "Heart of Rhythm" Released: July 31, 2012

Tomorrowland is the fourth studio album by Americana singer-songwriter Ryan Bingham, released on September 18, 2012. The album was recorded in Malibu, California with producer Justin Stanley and was self-released through Bingham's new independent record label Axster Bingham Records.

== Release ==
The album's release on Bingham's own label comes following his departure from Lost Highway Records for his first three albums. His deal with Lost Highway started as an artist development contract that came to an end with Junky Star and Bingham decided to use social-networking sites like Facebook and Twitter to promote his newly recorded materials, like Tomorrowland directly to fans online and at his live shows. In an interview with American Songwriter, Bingham also revealed the label he formed with his wife Anna Axster is designed to allow them to focus more on the creative side of music, rather than the "corporate record world."

== Promotion ==
Roughly two weeks prior to the album's release, tracks from the album were previewed online by magazines Entertainment Weekly, Rolling Stone, and Glamour. Entertainment Weekly featured the song "Beg for Broken Legs" on its Music Mix blog starting September 5, 2012. For twenty-four hours starting on September 6, 2012, Rolling Stone featured "Guess Who's Knocking". On September 7, 2012, Glamour previewed "Flower Bomb" and included a brief "get-to-know" Bingham question-and-answer section for its readers in its Obsessed blog.

== Track listing ==
All tracks are written by Ryan Bingham.

jelli
No.	Title	Length
1.	"Beg for Broken Legs"	4:14
2.	"Western Shore"	6:01
3.	"Flower Bomb"	4:07
4.	"Guess Who's Knocking"	4:03
5.	"Heart of Rhythm"	3:35
6.	"I Heard 'em Say"	4:00
7.	"Rising of the Ghetto"	8:07
8.	"No Help from God"	6:41
9.	"Keep It Together"	4:31
10.	"Never Far Behind"	6:11
11.	"The Road I'm On"	2:21
12.	"Neverending Show"	4:59
13.	"Too Deep to Fill"	3:45
Total length:		62:35

== Chart performance ==
Chart	Peak position
US Billboard 200	36
US Independent Albums (Billboard)	8
US Top Country Albums (Billboard)	7
US Top Rock Albums (Billboard)	16
US Vinyl Albums (Billboard)	13
