= Junky Star =

Studio album by Ryan Bingham
- Released: August 31, 2010
- Genre: Americana
- Label: Lost Highway Records
- Producer: T-Bone Burnett

Ryan Bingham chronology
Roadhouse Sun (2009)	Junky Star (2010)	Tomorrowland (2012)

Professional ratings
Aggregate scores
Source	Rating
Metacritic	69/100
Review scores
Source	Rating
SPIN	6/10 stars

Junky Star is the third studio album by Ryan Bingham released in 2010 through Lost Highway Records.

== Track listing ==
1. "The Poet" – 4:56
2. "The Wandering" – 3:08
3. "Strange Feelin' In The Air" - 4:46
4. "Junky Star" – 4:49
5. "Depression" – 4:53
6. "Hallelujah" - 5:00
7. "Yesterday's Blues" - 4:14
8. "Direction Of The Wind" - 4:29
9. "Lay My Head On The Rail" - 2:59
10. "Hard Worn Trail" - 3:55
11. "Self-Righteous Wall" - 5:17
12. "All Choked Up Again" - 6:11
13. "The Weary Kind (bonus track on editions)" - 4:19

== Chart performance ==
Chart (2010)	Peak position
U.S. Billboard 200	19
U.S. Billboard Top Country Albums	2
U.S. Billboard Top Rock Albums	8
