= Crazy Heart =

- Theatrical release poster
- Directed by: Scott Cooper
- Screenplay by: Scott Cooper
- Based on: Crazy Heart by Thomas Cobb
- Produced by: Robert Duvall; Rob Carliner; Judy Cairo; T Bone Burnett; Scott Cooper
- Starring: Jeff Bridges; Maggie Gyllenhaal; Robert Duvall
- Cinematography: Barry Markowitz
- Edited by: John Axelrad; Jeffrey Ford
- Music by: Stephen Bruton; T Bone Burnett; Ryan Bingham
- Production companies: Dune Entertainment; Informant Media; Butcher's Run Films
- Distributed by: Fox Searchlight Pictures
- Release dates: December 6, 2009 (Santa Fe Film Festival); December 16, 2009 (United States)
- Running time: 112 minutes
- Country: United States
- Language: English
- Budget: $7 million
- Box office: $47.4 million

Crazy Heart is a 2009 American drama film, written and directed by Scott Cooper in his feature directorial debut. Based on the 1987 novel of the same name by Thomas Cobb, the story was inspired by country singer Hank Thompson. Starring Jeff Bridges, Maggie Gyllenhaal, Colin Farrell, and Robert Duvall, the film follows an alcoholic country singer and songwriter who tries to turn his life around after beginning a relationship with a young journalist. Bridges, Farrell, and Duvall also sing in the film.

Filming took place in 2008 throughout New Mexico, as well as Houston and Los Angeles. Original music for the film was composed by T Bone Burnett, Stephen Bruton, and Ryan Bingham. It was dedicated to Bruton, who died the same year the film was made. The film was produced by Country Music Television and was originally acquired by Paramount Vantage for a direct-to-video release, but was later purchased by Fox Searchlight Pictures for theatrical release.

Crazy Heart opened in theaters in the United States on December 16, 2009. From its $7 million budget, it amassed domestic earnings of $39.5 million plus $7.9 international for a worldwide total of $47.4 million. The film was met with critical acclaim and received three nominations at the 82nd Academy Awards, winning Best Actor for Bridges and Best Original Song for "The Weary Kind", written by Bingham and Burnett.

== Plot ==
Otis "Bad" Blake is a 57-year-old alcoholic singer-songwriter who was once a country music star. He now earns a modest living by performing in small-town bars across the southwestern United States. Having a history of failed marriages (four that he admits to, although a reference is made to a fifth he does not discuss), Blake is without a family. He has a son, aged 28, with whom he has not had contact in 24 years. He is mostly on the road performing, staying in cheap motels, and travelling alone in his 1978 Chevrolet Suburban. The film opens with his arrival at a bowling alley for a show.

In Santa Fe, he meets Jean Craddock, a young journalist after a story, divorced and with a four-year-old son, Buddy. She interviews Blake one evening after his gig, and then as they become close, Jean visits again ostensibly to gather more material, and the two enter into a relationship. Jean and her son become a catalyst for Blake to get his life back on track. In doing so, he lets himself be pushed into renewing a professional relationship with Tommy Sweet, a popular and successful country music star he once mentored, and plays as the opening act at one of his concerts, despite his initial balking and wounded pride at being the opening act to his former student. He asks Tommy to record an album with him, but Tommy says his record company insists on a couple more solo albums before a duet project can be recorded. He instead suggests that Blake concentrate on writing new songs that Tommy can record solo, telling him he writes better songs than anyone else.

Blake's drinking soon gets out of control and he ends up running off the road while driving drunk. In the hospital, the doctor informs him that although he only sustained a broken ankle from the crash, he is slowly killing himself, and must stop drinking and smoking and lose 25 pounds if he wants to live more than a few more years. Blake's relationship with Jean makes him start to rethink his life. While in Houston, he calls up his son to make amends, only to learn that his mother, Bad's ex-wife, has died. Jean and her son begin to visit more frequently, but after Blake briefly loses Buddy at a shopping mall while drinking at a bar, Jean breaks up with him.

Blake resolves to quit drinking, and after going through a treatment program at a rehab center, with support from an Alcoholics Anonymous group and old friend Wayne, he finally manages to get sober. Having cleaned up his act, he tries to reunite with Jean but, despite congratulating him on getting sober and wishing him well, she tells Blake that the best thing he can do for her and Buddy is to leave them alone. Later, Blake finishes writing a song that he thinks is his best ever, "The Weary Kind", and sells it to Tommy.

Sixteen months later, Tommy plays "The Weary Kind" to an appreciative audience while Blake watches backstage, as his manager presents him with another of the large royalty checks for the song. As Blake is leaving, Jean approaches him, saying she has come to the show as writer for a large music publication. As they catch up, Blake sees an engagement ring on Jean's finger and tells her that she deserves a good man. He offers her the money from the royalty check for Buddy to have on his 18th birthday, which Jean initially refuses but eventually accepts after Blake says the song would not exist without her, and states that "it isn't money". Jean asks if Blake would like to see Buddy again, but Blake declines, saying it might be too unsettling for the boy. The film ends with Jean asking Blake for another interview, after which they walk away happily, chatting with each other.

== Cast ==
- Jeff Bridges as Otis "Bad" Blake
- Maggie Gyllenhaal as Jean Craddock
- Colin Farrell as Tommy Sweet
- Robert Duvall as Wayne Kramer
- Paul Herman as Jack Greene
- Jack Nation as Buddy, Jean's son
- Ryan Bingham as Tony of Tony and the Renegades, backup group at bowling alley
- Rick Dial as Wesley Barnes, Jean's uncle, Santa Fe piano player
- Tom Bower as Bill Wilson

== Production ==
=== Development of original novel ===
The New York Times said the novel, written by Thomas Cobb, "also functions as a shrewd and funny running critique of contemporary country music." Cobb based the character "Bad" Blake on country music entertainer Hank Thompson, Ramblin' Jack Elliott and Cobb's doctoral advisor in graduate school, Donald Barthelme; Cobb studied with Barthelme in a creative writing class in the University of Houston in the 1980s. When Cobb struggled between using an "upbeat" ending and a "downbeat" ending, Barthelme suggested that Cobb use the "downbeat" ending. The nickname "Bad" came from a sentence that popped into Cobb's mind, "Bad's got the sweats again." The name "Blake" came from W. Glenn Blake, a friend from graduate school who is now a senior editor at Boulevard magazine, and some people Cobb knew in Tucson, Arizona. The book, which was out of print since its original publication, went into print again when the film was released.

=== Pre-production ===
The process of creating a film adaptation took many years because the concept was optioned, but was never produced into an actual adaptation until director Scott Cooper produced the film. Cobb assumed that the film would use a more upbeat ending, because the Hollywood film industry often prefers "things that are generally positive". According to Cobb, he had nothing to do with the making of the film. The shooting of a sequence depicting the novel's ending—in which Bad falls off the wagon and dies of a heart attack—occurred; Cooper wanted to use it as the ending, but he did not get final authority to do so. A sequence of Bad Blake visiting his son in Los Angeles was also cut from the final film.

Bridges initially passed on the role when he was first offered it. He explained to Vanity Fair that although he liked the script, he realized that the songs would make or break it and at the time the film had no musical attachments. A year later he talked with T Bone Burnett, who was approached to work on the film's soundtrack; together they both agreed to work on the film, and Bridges joined the project.

=== Music ===
The album entitled Crazy Heart: Original Motion Picture Soundtrack was released in 2009 to accompany the film. The 23-track album contains many songs written by Burnett, Bruton, and Bingham, but also some by John Goodwin, Bob Neuwirth, Sam Hopkins, Gary Nicholson, Townes Van Zandt, Sam Philips, Greg Brown, Billy Joe Shaver, and Eddy Shaver.

The songs are performed by various artists including actors Bridges, Farrell, and Duvall, as well as singers Bingham (who sings the theme song "The Weary Kind" and plays Tony in the film), Buck Owens, The Louvin Brothers, Lightnin' Hopkins, Waylon Jennings, Townes Van Zandt, and Sam Philips.

At the 82nd Grammy Awards, the theme song "The Weary Kind" by Ryan Bingham won for Best Song Written For Motion Picture, Television Or Other Visual Media and the soundtrack also won for Best Compilation Soundtrack Album For Motion Picture, Television Or Other Visual Media.

== Reception ==
=== Critical response ===
Review aggregator website Rotten Tomatoes reports that 90% of critics have given the film a positive review based on 212 reviews, with an average score of 7.40/10. The consensus reads, "Thanks to a captivating performance from Jeff Bridges, Crazy Heart transcends its overly familiar origins and finds new meaning in an old story." On Metacritic the film holds a score of 83 out of 100 based on 32 reviews, indicating "universal acclaim".

Critics mainly praised the performance of Jeff Bridges as Bad Blake, with many claiming he elevated the film above its seemingly conventional story and languid pace. Tom Long from Detroit News writes, "It's a bit too easy, a bit too familiar, and maybe even a bit too much fun. But the easy magic Bridges brings to the screen makes it all work." The Toronto Star's Linda Barnard attests that "some goodwill evaporates in the final reel, when a few false endings lead to a choice that's not the best one for Crazy Heart, but the generosity of Bridges' performance puts us in a forgiving mood."

Jeff Bridges' performance earned him the Academy Award for Best Actor, as well as Best Actor prizes from the Los Angeles Film Critics Association, Broadcast Film Critics Association, Golden Globe Awards, Screen Actors Guild and the Independent Spirit Awards. Bridges also received nominations from the Chicago Film Critics Association, London Critics Circle, Online Film Critics Society and the Satellite Awards. Gyllenhaal was nominated for an Academy Award for Best Supporting Actress for her performance. The song "The Weary Kind" earned Ryan Bingham and T Bone Burnett the 2009 Academy Award for Best Original Song and a Golden Globe.

=== Accolades ===
Year	Association	Category	Nominated work	Result
2009	Satellite Award	Satellite Award for Best Actor – Motion Picture	Jeff Bridges	Nominated
2009	Satellite Award	Satellite Award for Best Original Song	"The Weary Kind"	Won
2009	Los Angeles Film Critics Association	Los Angeles Film Critics Association Award for Best Actor	Jeff Bridges	Won
2009	Las Vegas Film Critics Society	Las Vegas Film Critics Society Award for Best Song	"The Weary Kind"	Won
2009	Chicago Film Critics Association	Chicago Film Critics Association Award for Best Actor	Jeff Bridges	Nominated
2010	Academy Award	Academy Award for Best Actor	Jeff Bridges	Won
2010	Academy Award	Academy Award for Best Supporting Actress	Maggie Gyllenhaal	Nominated
2010	Academy Award	Academy Award for Best Original Song	"The Weary Kind"	Won
2010	British Academy Film Award	BAFTA Award for Best Actor in a Leading Role	Jeff Bridges	Nominated
2010	British Academy Film Award	BAFTA Award for Best Film Music	T Bone Burnett, Stephen Bruton	Nominated
2010	Broadcast Film Critics Association Award	Broadcast Film Critics Association Award for Best Actor	Jeff Bridges	Won
2010	Broadcast Film Critics Association Award	Broadcast Film Critics Association Award for Best Song	"The Weary Kind"	Won
2010	Golden Globe Award	Golden Globe Award for Best Actor – Motion Picture Drama	Jeff Bridges	Won
2010	Golden Globe Award	Golden Globe Award for Best Original Song	"The Weary Kind"	Won
2010	Independent Spirit Award	Independent Spirit Award for Best First Feature	Scott Cooper	Won
2010	Independent Spirit Award	Independent Spirit Award for Best Male Lead	Jeff Bridges	Won
2010	Screen Actors Guild Award	Screen Actors Guild Award for Outstanding Performance by a Male Actor in a Leading Role	Jeff Bridges	Won

== Home media ==
The film was released on April 20, 2010, on DVD and Blu-ray. The single-disc DVD's special features included six deleted scenes, while the two-disc Blu-ray set contained eight deleted scenes (including one in which Bad reunites with his son), plus two alternative music cuts and a short documentary in which the stars discuss "What Brought Them to Crazy Heart".
