= The Best of Bread =

Greatest hits album by Bread
- Released: March 1973
- Genre: Soft rock
- Length: 33:25; 60:14 (2001 re-issue)
- Label: Elektra
- Producer: David Gates

Bread chronology
Guitar Man (1972)	The Best of Bread (1973)	The Best of Bread, Volume 2 (1974)

Professional ratings
Review scores
Source	Rating
AllMusic	4.5/5 stars
Christgau's Record Guide	B

The Best of Bread is a multi-platinum compilation album by the band Bread released in 1973 by Elektra Records. The original album contains 12 songs that were first released between 1969 and 1972.

== Release history ==
In addition to the usual 2 channel stereo version the album was also released by Elektra in a 4 channel quadraphonic version in 1973. The quadraphonic version was released on LP record, 8-track tape and reel-to-reel tape. The quadraphonic LP was encoded using the Quadradisc system.

The 2001 CD re-issue by Rhino has eight additional tracks including several from the 1974 album The Best of Bread, Volume 2, along with the November 1976 single Lost Without Your Love.

In 2015 Audio Fidelity released the 12 song album on the Super Audio CD format. This edition contains both stereo and quadraphonic mixes.

== Track listing ==
All songs written by David Gates except as noted.

Side one

1. "Make It with You" (from On the Waters, 1970) – 3:15
2. "Everything I Own" (from Baby I'm-a Want You, 1972) – 3:06
3. "Diary" (from Baby I'm-a Want You, 1972) – 3:05
4. "Baby I'm-a Want You" (from Baby I'm-a Want You, 1972) – 2:25
5. "It Don't Matter to Me" (single, 1970) – 2:41
6. "If" (from Manna, 1971) – 2:33

Side two

7. "Mother Freedom" (from Baby I'm-a Want You, 1972) – 2:55
8. "Down on My Knees" (Gates, James Griffin) (from Baby I'm-a Want You, 1972) – 2:44
9. "Too Much Love" (Griffin, Robb Royer) (from Manna, 1971) – 2:45
10. "Let Your Love Go" (from Manna, 1971) – 2:25
11. "Look What You've Done" (Griffin, Royer) (from On the Waters, 1970) – 3:10
12. "Truckin'" (Griffin, Royer) (from Manna, 1971) – 2:31

Additional tracks (2001 re-issue)

13. "The Guitar Man" (from Guitar Man, 1972) – 3:42
14. "Aubrey" (from Guitar Man, 1972) – 3:36
15. "The Last Time" (Griffin, Royer) (from Bread, 1969) – 4:06
16. "Sweet Surrender" (from Guitar Man, 1972) – 2:33
17. "He's a Good Lad" (from Manna, 1971) – 2:53
18. "Daughter" (from Baby I'm-a Want You, 1972) – 3:17
19. "Friends and Lovers" (Griffin, Royer, Tim Hallinan) (from Bread, 1969) – 3:50
20. "Lost Without Your Love" (from Lost Without Your Love, 1977) – 2:52

Tracks 13, 14, 16, 17, 18, and 19 appeared on 1974's The Best of Bread, Volume 2.

== Charts ==
=== Weekly charts ===
Weekly chart performance for The Best of Bread
Chart	Peak position
Canadian RPM Albums Chart	3
Greek Albums (IFPI)	47
Hungarian Physical Albums (MAHASZ)	34
New Zealand Albums Chart	15
UK Albums (Official Charts)	7
US Billboard 200	2

=== Year-end charts ===
Year-end chart performance for The Best of Bread
Chart (1973)	Position
US Billboard Pop Albums	18
Chart (1974)	Position
US Billboard Pop Albums	28
Chart (1975)	Position
UK Albums (OCC)	44

== Certifications ==
Certifications for The Best of Bread
Region	Certification	Certified units/sales
Australia (ARIA)	Gold	20,000^{^}
United Kingdom (BPI)	Silver	60,000^{^}
United States (RIAA)	5× Platinum	5,000,000^{^}
^{^} Shipments figures based on certification alone.
