= The David Gates Songbook =

Compilation album by David Gates
- Released: October 2002
- Genre: Pop rock, soft rock
- Label: Warner Bros.
- Producer: David Gates

David Gates chronology
Love Is Always Seventeen (1994)	The David Gates Songbook (2002)

Singles from The David Gates Songbook
- 1. "Find Me" Released: 2002

Professional ratings
Review scores
Source	Rating
Allmusic	4/5 stars

The David Gates Songbook is a compilation album by David Gates of Bread. It consists of previously released as well as new solo material; and songs with his former band Bread.

Track six is a new recording of the title cut from his 1994 album Love Is Always Seventeen.

== Track listing ==
1. "Make It with You" (previously released on On the Waters)
2. "Find Me"
3. "Baby I'm-a Want You" (previously released on Baby I'm-a Want You)
4. "I Can't Play the Songs"
5. "If" (previously released on Manna)
6. "Love Is Always Seventeen" (originally recorded on Love Is Always Seventeen)
7. "It Don't Matter to Me" (previously released on Bread)
8. "The Mustang"
9. "Everything I Own" (previously released on Baby I'm-a Want You)
10. "Mirror, Mirror"
11. "Lost Without Your Love" (previously released on Lost Without Your Love)
12. "This Could Be Forever" (previously released on Take Me Now)
13. "Aubrey" (previously released on Guitar Man)
14. "Sail Around the World" (previously released on First)
15. "Part-Time Love" (previously released on Goodbye Girl)
16. "Sweet Surrender" (previously released on Guitar Man)
17. "Goodbye Girl" (previously released on Goodbye Girl)
18. "Never Let Her Go" (previously released on Goodbye Girl)
19. "Diary" (previously released on Baby I'm-a Want You)
20. "The Guitar Man" (previously released on Guitar Man)

== Charts ==
Chart (2002/03)	Peak position
Australian Albums (ARIA Charts)	34
United Kingdom (OCC)	11
