= The Sound of Bread =

1977 compilation album by Bread

The Sound of Bread, Their 20 Finest Songs

Compilation album by Bread
- Released: 1977
- Genre: Soft rock
- Label: Elektra

Alternative cover / title
- 1985 U.S. release, Anthology of Bread

The Sound of Bread, Their 16 Finest Songs

Compilation album by Bread
- Released: 1982
- Genre: Soft rock
- Label: K-Tel

The Sound of Bread, Their 20 Finest Songs is a compilation album by American soft rock band, Bread, released in November 1977 by Elektra Records in the UK. It reached Number 1 on the UK Album Chart. The album was issued in the US in 1985 as Anthology of Bread.

The Sound of Bread, Their 16 Finest Songs is a different Bread compilation album released in 1982 in the US by K-tel.

== Track listing ==
=== The Sound of Bread, Their 20 Finest Songs / Anthology of Bread ===
LP side A:

1. "Make It with You"
2. "Dismal Day"
3. "London Bridge"
4. "Any Way You Want Me"
5. "Look What You've Done"
6. "It Don't Matter to Me"
7. "The Last Time"
8. "Let Your Love Go"
9. "Truckin'"
10. "If"

LP side B:

1. "Baby I'm-a Want You"
2. "Everything I Own"
3. "Down on My Knees"
4. "Just Like Yesterday" (...Their 20 Finest Songs) or "Aubrey" (Anthology...)
5. "Diary"
6. "Sweet Surrender"
7. "The Guitar Man"
8. "Fancy Dancer"
9. "She's the Only One"
10. "Lost Without Your Love"

=== The Sound of Bread, Their 16 Finest Songs ===
LP side A:

1. "Make It with You"
2. "The Guitar Man"
3. "Been Too Long on the Road"
4. "London Bridge"
5. "It Don't Matter to Me"
6. "Let Your Love Go"
7. "If"
8. "Mother Freedom"

LP side B:

1. "Baby I'm-a Want You"
2. "Everything I Own"
3. "Aubrey"
4. "Diary"
5. "He's a Good Lad"
6. "Sweet Surrender"
7. "Dismal Day"
8. "Lost Without Your Love"

== Charts ==
=== Weekly charts ===
Chart (1977–78)	Peak position
Australian Albums (Kent Music Report)	28
Dutch Albums (Album Top 100)	26
New Zealand Albums (RMNZ)	2
UK Albums (OCC)	1

=== Year-end charts ===
Chart (1977)	Position
New Zealand Albums (RMNZ)	5
UK Albums (OCC)	7

== Certifications and sales ==
Region	Certification	Certified units/sales
United Kingdom (BPI)	Platinum	300,000^{^}
^{^} Shipments figures based on certification alone.
