= The Best of Bread, Volume 2 =

Compilation album by Bread
- Released: May 1974
- Genre: Rock
- Length: 40:25
- Label: Elektra
- Producer: David Gates

Bread chronology
The Best of Bread (1973)	The Best of Bread, Volume 2 (1974)	Lost Without Your Love (1977)

Professional ratings
Review scores
Source	Rating
Allmusic	3/5 stars

The Best of Bread, Volume 2 is a 1974 compilation album by the band Bread.

== Track listing ==
All songs written by David Gates except as noted.

LP Side A

1. "Sweet Surrender" – 2:35
2. "Fancy Dancer" (Botts, Griffin) – 3:31
3. "The Guitar Man" – 3:55
4. "Been Too Long on the Road" – 4:49
5. "Friends and Lovers" (Griffin, Royer) – 3:51
6. "Aubrey" – 3:38

LP Side B

1. "Daughter" – 3:21
2. "Dream Lady" (Griffin, Royer) – 3:23
3. "Yours for Life" – 3:20
4. "Just Like Yesterday" (Griffin) – 2:35
5. "He's a Good Lad" – 2:57
6. "London Bridge" – 2:30

Tracks A1, A3, A5, A6, B1 and B5 are also included on the Rhino CD re-issue of 1973's The Best of Bread.
