= Guitar Man =

Guitar Man may refer to:

== Albums ==
- Guitar Man (Bread album), 1972
  - "The Guitar Man", a 1972 song from the album
- Guitar Man (George Benson album), 2011
- Guitar Man (Hank Marvin album), 2007
- Guitar Man (J.J. Cale album), 1996, or the title song
- Guitar Man (Elvis Presley album), a posthumous album by Elvis Presley, 1981

== Songs ==
- "(Dance with the) Guitar Man", a 1962 song by Duane Eddy
- "Guitar Man" (song), a 1967 song written by Jerry Reed, covered by Elvis Presley
- "Guitar Man", a song by Kip Moore from Slowheart, 2017

== Other ==
- The Guitar Man logo for the annual Teenage Cancer Trust concerts at Royal Albert Hall
- Guitar Man, a fictional guitar player modelled on Stevie Ray Vaughan (leader of The Disciples of Soul), in Scout
