= Falling in Love Again (David Gates album) =

Studio album by David Gates
- Released: 1980
- Genres: Pop rock, soft rock
- Length: 29:30
- Labels: Elektra; Wounded Bird
- Producer: David Gates

David Gates chronology
Goodbye Girl (1978)	Falling in Love Again (1980)	Take Me Now (1981)

Singles from Falling In Love Again
- 1. "Where Does The Lovin' Go" Released: 1980

Falling in Love Again is a solo album by David Gates of Bread.

== Critical reception ==
Professional ratings
Review scores
Source	Rating
AllMusic	2/5 stars
The Encyclopedia of Popular Music	2/5 stars
The New Rolling Stone Album Guide	2/5 stars
Record Mirror	1/5 stars

The album received mixed to fair reviews. Orange Coast wrote that "there is a general lack of variety here, although Gates does attempt to mix ballads with a few uptempo numbers." The Sault Star praised Gates's "smooth clean vocals," noting that the album "exploits the soft rock avenue to the limit."

== Track listing ==
All tracks composed and arranged by David Gates

1. "Can I Call You" - (3:44)
2. "Where Does the Lovin' Go" - (3:04)
3. "20th Century Man" - (2:41)
4. "She Was So Young" - (2:40)
5. "Silky" - (2:37)
6. "Falling in Love Again" - (2:18)
7. "Starship Ride" - (2:50)
8. "Chingo" - (3:05)
9. "Sweet Desire" - (2:58)
10. "The Rainbow Song" - (3:33)

== Personnel ==
- David Gates – guitar, vocals
- Dan Dugmore – steel guitar
- David Minor – bass
- Hadley Hockensmith – guitar
- Jim Horn – saxophone
- Larry Knechtel – keyboards
- Mike Botts – drums
- Robin Williamson – guitar
