= Elektra Sound Recorders =

Recording studio in Los Angeles, California, United States

- Company type: Recording studio
- Industry: Music

Elektra Sound Recorders was Elektra Records's recording studio in Los Angeles, California, United States located at 962 La Cienega Boulevard. Electric Entertainment currently provides video production services at this location.

== History ==
In 1958, Jac Holzman built the first Elektra studio at 116 West 14th Street, New York City, on the northern edge of Greenwich Village. In 1968, Holzman built Elektra Sound Recorders in West Hollywood, and ordered the second U.S.-bound Sound Techniques A Range mixing console for the studio. Elektra's Hollywood studio was used to record notable albums by The Doors, Bread, The Rolling Stones, The Stooges, Harry Chapin, Dan Fogelberg, Jackson Browne, and others.

== Selected list of albums recorded at Elektra (by year) ==
- Judy Collins: Who Knows Where the Time Goes - 1968
- Tim Buckley: Happy Sad - 1968
- Bread: Bread - 1969
- Delaney & Bonnie: The Original Delaney & Bonnie & Friends - 1969
- The Doors: The Soft Parade - 1969
- The Rolling Stones: Let It Bleed - 1969
- Dave Mason: Alone Together - 1970
- The Doors: Morrison Hotel - 1970
- Essra Mohawk: Primordial Lovers - 1970
- Stalk-Forrest Group: St. Cecilia: The Elektra Recordings - 1970
- The Stooges: Fun House - 1970
- Paul Siebel: Jack-Knife Gypsy - 1971
- Bread: Guitar Man - 1972
- Harry Chapin: Heads & Tales - 1972
- Harry Chapin: Sniper and Other Love Songs - 1972
- David Gates: First - 1973
- Dan Fogelberg: Souvenirs - 1974
- Ian Matthews: Some Days You Eat the Bear - 1974
- Jackson Browne: Late for the Sky - 1974
- Bonnie Raitt: Home Plate - 1975
- David Gates: Never Let Her Go - 1975
- Elliott Murphy: Lost Generation - 1975
- Outlaws: Outlaws - 1975
- Keith Carradine: I'm Easy - 1976
- Warren Zevon: Warren Zevon - 1976
- Bread: Lost Without Your Love - 1977
- Joe Cocker: Luxury You Can Afford - 1978
