= Everything I Own (album) =

1974 studio album by Ken Boothe

Studio album by Ken Boothe
- Released: 1974
- Recorded: 1974; Chalk Farm (London, United Kingdom); Federal (Kingston, Jamaica)
- Genre: Reggae
- Length: 40:50
- Label: Trojan
- Producer: Lloyd Charmers, The Cimarons, Webster Shrowder

Ken Boothe chronology
Black Gold and Green (1972)	Everything I Own (1974)	Let's Get It On (1974)

Singles from Everything I Own
- 1. "Everything I Own" Released: 1974; 2. "Crying Over You" Released: 1974

Everything I Own is the seventh studio album by Jamaican recording artist Ken Boothe. It was released in 1974 by Trojan Records. It is not to be confused with the three Ken Boothe compilation albums, Everything I Own (1997), Everything I Own: The Best of Ken Boothe (2003) and Everything I Own: The Definitive Collection (2007).

The most famous track from this album is the title track, "Everything I Own" (originally recorded by American band Bread), which was an international hit and became number one on the UK Singles Chart. "Crying Over You was similarly successful in the UK, reaching #11 on the UK Singles charts in 1974.

"Speak Softly Love" adapts the melody from The Godfather.

== Track listing ==
#	Title	Songwriters	Length
1.	Everything I Own	David Gates	3:45
2.	Evil Girl	D. Washington	3:26
3.	Crying Over You	Lloyd Charmers	3:33
4.	Sad and Lonely	Ken Boothe	2:48
5.	My Heart Is Like An Open Book	Ken Boothe	2:46
6.	The Impossible Dream (Note: Also known simply as "Impossible Dream" on some pressings of the album.)	Joe Darion, Mitch Leigh	2:49
7.	Speak Softly Love (Note: Also known as "Godfather" on some pressings of the album.)	Nino Rota, Larry Kusik	2:59
8.	My Kid	Franklyn Dunn	3:34
9.	Sandie	Paul Douglas	3:20
10.	Come Lay Some Loving On Me (Note: Also known as "Lay Some Loving" on some pressings of the album.)	Buddy Kellen, Paul Kelly	3:17
11.	You Will Reach Your Goal	Ken Boothe	3:14
12.	Time Passage	Carl Levy	4:59

== Personnel ==
- Ken Boothe – Vocals
- Johnny Arthey & Tony King – Arrangement (All tracks except 1, 3, 6, 9)
- Franklyn Dunn – Bass (All tracks except 1, 3, 6, 9)
- Lloyd Parks – Bass (Tracks 1, 3, 6, 9)
- Federal Soul Givers – Brass (Tracks 1, 3, 6, 9)
- Ken Elliot – Clavinet & Synthesizer (All tracks except 1, 3, 6, 9)
- Maurice Ellis – Drums (All tracks except 1, 3, 6, 9)
- Paul Douglas a.k.a. Paul Williams – Drums (Tracks 1, 3, 6, 9)
- Sid Bucknor & Vic Keary – Engineer (All tracks except 1, 3, 6, 9)
- Buddy Davidson & George Raymond – Mixing Engineer (Tracks 1, 3, 6, 9)
- Locksley Gichie – Guitar (All tracks except 1, 3, 6, 9)
- Willie Lindo – Guitar (Tracks 1, 3, 6, 9)
- Carl Levy – Keyboards (All tracks except 1, 3, 6, 9)
- Lloyd Charmers – Producer, Organ, Piano & Percussion (Tracks 1, 3, 6, 9)
- The Cimarons & Webster Shrowder – Producer (All tracks except 1, 3, 6, 9)

== Release history ==
Release history of Everything I Own
Year	Country	Label	Catalog No.	Format
1974	United Kingdom	Trojan Records	TRLS 95	LP
1974	Netherlands	Philips	6370 675	LP
1975	Japan	Trojan Records	RJ-7004	LP
1977	West Germany	Trojan Records	6.23052	LP
1978	France	Trojan Records	2C 068 61.825	LP
2010	Europe	Trojan Records/Spectrum Music	SPECORIG1008	CD
2015	Europe	Trojan Records/BMG	TJCD503	CD
2017	Europe	Trojan Records/Music on Vinyl	MOVLP1943	LP
