= Love Is Always Seventeen =

Love is Always Seventeen

Studio album by David Gates
- Released: September 6, 1994
- Recorded: 1994
- Genre: Country rock; soft rock
- Label: Discovery
- Producer: David Gates

David Gates chronology
Take Me Now (1981)	Love is Always Seventeen (1994)	The David Gates Songbook (2002)

Singles from Love Is Always Seventeen
- 1. "I Can't Find the Words to Say Goodbye" Released: 1994

Professional ratings
Review scores
Source	Rating
AllMusic	3/5 stars
Calgary Herald	B
The Encyclopedia of Popular Music	2/5 stars
Los Angeles Times	2/4 stars

Love Is Always Seventeen is an album by the American singer-songwriter David Gates. It came after a 13-year break from recording. The album was released on September 6, 1994, through Discovery Records.

== Critical reception ==
The Los Angeles Times wrote: "Hummable melodies still come to Gates as easily as in the '70s; his lyrics remain simplistically romantic, as the title suggests." The Vancouver Sun deemed the album "breezy, cheerful country music." The Calgary Herald determined that "there is the occasional song where you want to sock him in the jaw and tell him to toughen up but, overall, he's come up with an album that's from the heart, for the heart and full of heart."

== Track listing ==
1. "Avenue of Love"
2. "Love Is Always Seventeen"
3. "Ordinary Man"
4. "I Will Wait for You"
5. "Save This Dance for Me"
6. "No Secrets in a Small Town"
7. "Heart, It's All Over"
8. "I Don't Want to Share Your Love"
9. "I Can't Find the Words to Say Goodbye"
10. "Dear World"
11. "Thankin' You Sweet Baby James"

== Personnel ==
- David Gates - vocals, acoustic guitar, arrangements
- Brent Mason - electric guitar
- Paul Franklin - steel guitar
- Lee Roy Parnell - slide guitar
- Glenn Worf, Michael Rhodes - bass
- Jerry Douglas - Dobro
- Rob Hajacos - fiddle
- Matt Rollings, Steve Nathan - keyboards
- Larry Knechtel - piano
- Eddie Bayers, Paul Leim - drums
- Terry McMillan - harmonica
- Mike Haynes - flugelhorn
- Billy Dean, Victoria Shaw, W.O. Smith Music School Singers - backing vocals
