= Guitar Man (Hank Marvin album) =

Studio album by Hank Marvin
- Released: 4 June 2007
- Recorded: Nivram Studios & Kingdom Studios, Perth, Western Australia
- Genre: Instrumental rock
- Label: Universal Music TV
- Producer: Hank B. Marvin

Hank Marvin chronology
Guitar Player (2002)	Guitar Man (2007)	Django’s Castle (2013)

Professional ratings
Review scores
Source	Rating
Allmusic	3/5 stars

Guitar Man is an album by guitarist Hank Marvin, released in 2007.

== Track listing ==
Track No	Song title	Songwriter/composer	Length	Song made famous for
1	The Guitar Man	David Gates	5:08	Bread
2	Fields of Gold	Sting	4:07	Sting
3	Wild World	Cat Stevens	5:07	Cat Stevens
4	Patience	Take That, John Shanks	3:49	Take That
5	Light My Fire	John Densmore, Robby Krieger, Ray Manzarek, Jim Morrison	3:45	The Doors
6	You've Got a Friend	Carole King	5:14	James Taylor
7	Here, There and Everywhere	John Lennon, Paul McCartney	3:46	The Beatles
8	Song for David	Hank Marvin, Gary Taylor	4:05	-
9	It Must Be Love	Labi Siffre	4:45	Labi Siffre/Madness
10	Don't Know Why	Jesse Harris	4:03	Norah Jones
11	Summer House	Ben Marvin, Phil Watts	3:18	-
12	If Tomorrow Never Comes	Garth Brooks, Kent Blazy	4:12	Garth Brooks/Ronan Keating
13	Nine Million Bicycles in Beijing	Mike Batt	3:25	Katie Melua
14	You're Beautiful	James Blunt, Sacha Skarbek, Amanda Ghost	4:44	James Blunt
15	While My Guitar Gently Weeps	George Harrison	4:45	The Beatles

== Personnel ==
- Lead guitar, arranger, producer – Hank B. Marvin
- Rhythm guitar, keyboards, arranger – Gary Taylor
- Rhythm guitar – Ben Marvin
- Rhythm guitar – Phil Watts
- Keyboards, accordion – Nunzio Mondia
- Bass guitar – Roy Martinez
- Drums, percussion – Ric Eastman
- Percussion – Chris Tarr
- Recording and mixing – Les Williams
- Mastering – Geoff Pesche

== Charts ==
=== Weekly charts ===
Chart (2007)	Peak position
Australian Albums (ARIA)	92
Scottish Albums (Official Charts)	13
UK Albums (Official Charts)	6

=== Year-end charts ===
Chart (2007)	Position
UK Albums (OCC)	200
