= Soul Box =

Studio album by Grover Washington Jr.
- Released: 1973
- Recorded: March 1973
- Studio: Van Gelder, Englewood Cliffs
- Genre: Jazz
- Length: 33:00 Soul Box Vol. 1; 35:18 Soul Box Vol. 2; 68:18 Verve CD
- Label: Kudu; KU-12/13
- Producer: Creed Taylor

Grover Washington Jr. chronology
All the King's Horses (1972)	Soul Box (1973)	Mister Magic (1975)

Alternative cover
- Verve CD reissue

Professional ratings
Review scores
Source	Rating
AllMusic	4.5/5 stars
The Rolling Stone Jazz Record Guide	2/5 stars

Soul Box is the third studio album by American saxophonist Grover Washington Jr. The project was originally divided into two LPs with nearly identical covers, both released in 1973 on Kudu Records as Soul Box Vol. 1 (KU-12) and Soul Box Vol. 2 (KU-13). It was then reissued as a two-LP set (KUX-1213). Both albums were recorded in March 1973 with the same personnel.

As compact discs gained popularity, Motown reissued Soul Box Vol. 1 and Soul Box Vol. 2 on CD in the early 1990s. Unfortunately, Vol. 2 was mastered with the wrong track separation. Original tracks #1 and #2 were combined into a single track of 17 minutes, track #3 was cut as track #2, and track #4 was cut as track #3. Subsequently, a misprint on the CD and the disc's back cover listed only three tracks. The titles did not match the corresponding tracks, and the tunes' durations did not match those listed on the LP.

It took until 2008, when Verve/GRP Records released the two volumes on one CD, to correct the errors and ensure track separations and title durations corresponded to the original Kudu LPs.

== Track listing ==
=== Soul Box Vol. 1 ===
1. "Aubrey" (David Gates) – 3:44
2. "Masterpiece" (Norman Whitfield) – 13:20
3. "Trouble Man" (Marvin Gaye) – 15:56

=== Soul Box Vol. 2 ===
1. "You Are the Sunshine of My Life" (Stevie Wonder) – 6:03
2. "Don't Explain" (Arthur Herzog Jr., Billie Holiday) – 11:11
3. "Medley: Easy Living/Ain't Nobody's Business If I Do" (Leo Robin, Ralph Rainger)/(Everett Robbins, Porter Grainger) – 9:56
4. "Taurian Matador" (Billy Cobham Jr.) – 8:08

=== Soul Box Vol. 1 ===
1. "Aubrey" (David Gates) – 3:44
2. "Masterpiece" (Norman Whitfield) – 13:22
3. "Trouble Man" (Marvin Gaye) – 15:54

=== Soul Box Vol. 2 (with incorrect track mastering & listing) ===
1. "You Are the Sunshine of My Life" (Stevie Wonder) – 17:23
2. "Don't Explain" (Arthur Herzog Jr., Billie Holiday) – 9:59
3. "Medley: Easy Living/'Taint Nobody's Business If I Do/Taurian Matador" (Leo Robin, Ralph Rainger)/(Everett Robbins, Porter Grainger/Billy Cobham Jr.) – 12:10

=== Verve 1*CD reissue ===
1. "Aubrey" (David Gates) – 3:44
2. "Masterpiece" (Norman Whitfield) – 13:20
3. "Trouble Man" (Marvin Gaye) – 15:56
4. "You Are the Sunshine of My Life" (Wonder) – 6:03
5. "Don't Explain" (Herzog Jr., Holiday) – 11:11
6. "Medley: Easy Living/Ain't Nobody's Business If I Do" (Robin, Rainger)/(Everett Robbins, Grainger) – 9:56
7. "Taurian Matador" (Billy Cobham Jr.) – 8:08

== Personnel ==
Band

- Grover Washington Jr. – alto saxophone, soprano saxophone, tenor saxophone
- Bob James – acoustic piano, electric piano, arrangements and conductor
- Richard Tee – organ
- Jay Berliner – guitars (1)
- Eric Gale – guitars (2–7)
- Ron Carter – electric bass, arco bass
- Richard Davis – arco bass
- Idris Muhammad – drums (1–6)
- Billy Cobham – drums (7)
- David Friedman – percussion
- Phil Kraus – percussion
- Ralph MacDonald – percussion
- Airto Moreira – percussion

Brass Section

- Paul Faulise, Alan Raph and Tony Studd – bass trombone
- Jim Buffington, Peter Gordon and Brooks Tillotson – French horn
- Wayne Andre and Sonny Russo – trombone
- Randy Brecker, Jon Faddis, John Frosk and Bernie Glow – trumpet, flugelhorn

Woodwind Section

- Wally Kane – bass saxophone, contrabass clarinet, clarinet, flute
- Harvey Estrin – flute, piccolo flute
- Hubert Laws – flute, piccolo flute
- George Marge – flute, oboe, piccolo flute
- Donald MacCourt – bassoon
- Romeo Penque – bass clarinet, clarinet, English horn, flute, oboe, piccolo flute

Strings

- Seymour Barab, Charles McCracken and George Ricci – cello
- Ron Carter – double bass
- Alfred Brown, Theodore Israel and Emanuel Vardi – viola
- Harry Cykman, Max Ellen, Paul Gershman, Emanuel Green, Harold Kohon, Charles Libove, Harry Lookofsky, Joe Malin, Gene Orloff, David Nadien and Elliot Rosoff – violin

Vocals

- William Eaton, Eileen Gilbert, Barbara Massey, Randolph Peyton, Maeretha Stewart and Bernard Thacker

== Production ==
- Creed Taylor – producer
- Rudy Van Gelder – engineer
- Kevin Reeves – CD mastering at Sterling Sound (New York, NY).
- Kyle Benson – A&R coordinator
- Andy Kman – production coordinator
- Hollis King – art direction
- Bob Ciano – album design
- Isabelle Wong – design
- David A. Leffel – album painting
- Harry Weinger – reissue supervisor
