= List of Billboard Easy Listening number ones of 1972 =

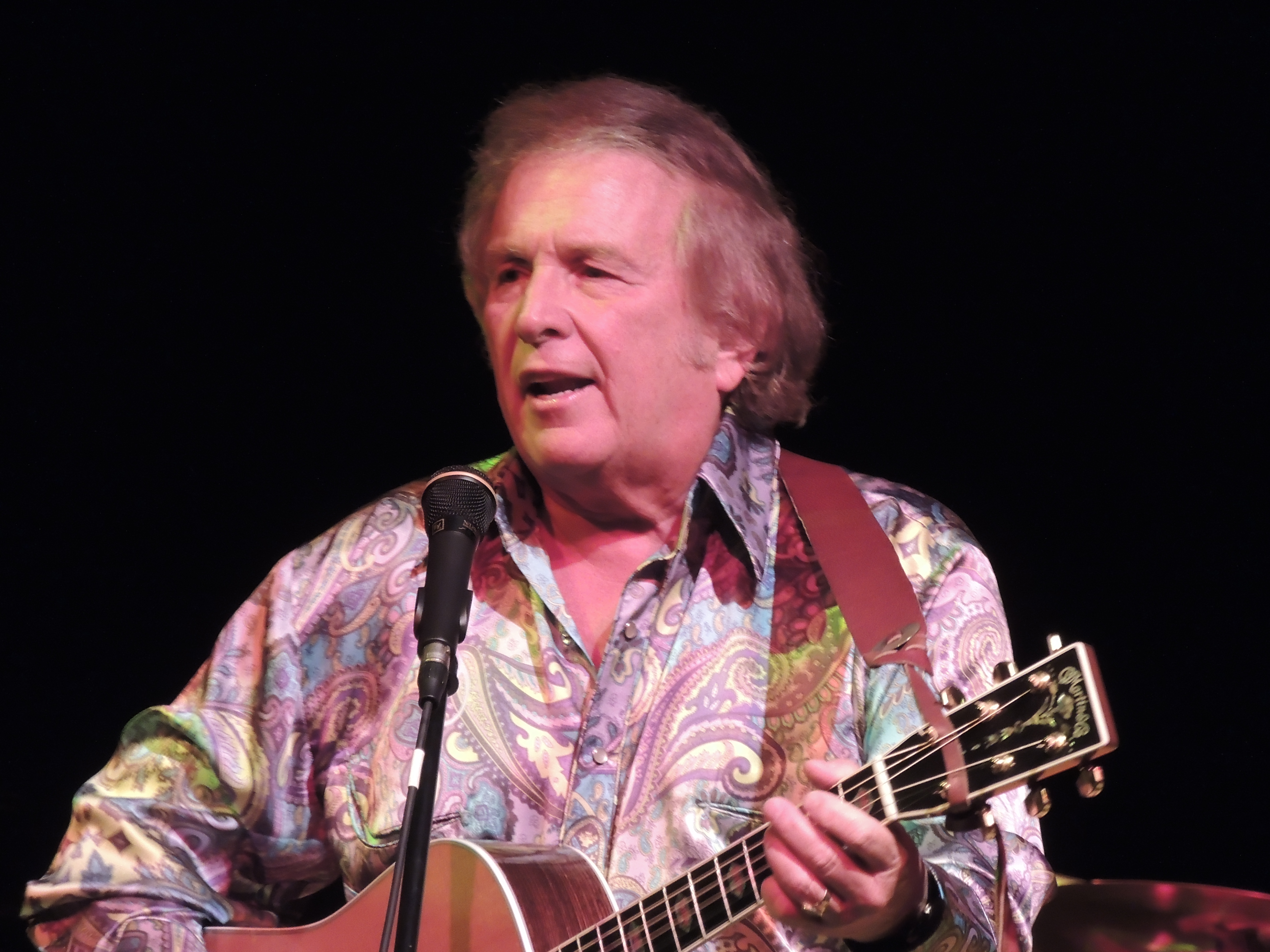
Don McLean (pictured in 2013) reached number one with the classic song "American Pie".

In 1972, Billboard magazine published a chart ranking the top-performing songs in the United States in the easy listening market. The chart, which in 1972 was entitled Easy Listening, has undergone various name changes and has been published under the title Adult Contemporary since 1996. In 1972, 21 songs topped the chart based on playlists submitted by radio stations and sales reports submitted by stores.

In the issue of Billboard dated January 1, 1972, Three Dog Night moved up two places to the number one position on the Easy Listening chart with "An Old Fashioned Love Song", but the band held the top spot for only a single week before being replaced by David Cassidy with "Cherish". One week later, Don McLean's "American Pie" took the number one position. The song, noted for its allegorical lyrics which are generally regarded as relating to the history of rock and roll music, also topped Billboard's pop singles chart, the Hot 100, and has come to be regarded as an all-time classic. In 2001, it was voted into the top 5 of a poll of the Songs of the Century compiled by the Recording Industry Association of America and the National Endowment for the Arts. Another of the year's chart-toppers, Nilsson's cover version of Badfinger's song "Without You", was included in Rolling Stone magazine's list of the 500 Greatest Songs of All Time in 2021.

The Irish singer Gilbert O'Sullivan had the highest total number of weeks at number one during 1972, spending six weeks in the top spot with "Alone Again (Naturally)" and three with "Clair". The former song also topped the Hot 100, as did many of the year's other Easy Listening number ones: "Without You" by Nilsson, "The First Time Ever I Saw Your Face" by Roberta Flack, "The Candy Man" by Sammy Davis Jr., Neil Diamond's "Song Sung Blue", "Black and White" by Three Dog Night, "Baby Don't Get Hooked on Me" by Mac Davis and "I Can See Clearly Now" by Johnny Nash, meaning that almost half of the year's Easy Listening chart-toppers also reached the pinnacle of the Hot 100. Flack was one of four artists to achieve two Easy Listening number ones in 1972, and both of her chart-toppers won Grammy Awards at the following year's ceremony. Diamond's "Song Sung Blue" was the longest-running number one on the Easy Listening chart, spending seven consecutive weeks in the top spot. The final chart-topper of the year was "Sweet Surrender" by Bread.

== Chart history ==
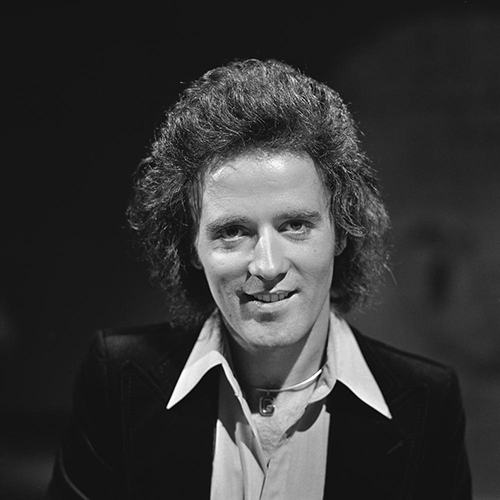
Gilbert O'Sullivan (pictured in 1974) had two number ones and spent nine weeks in the top spot.

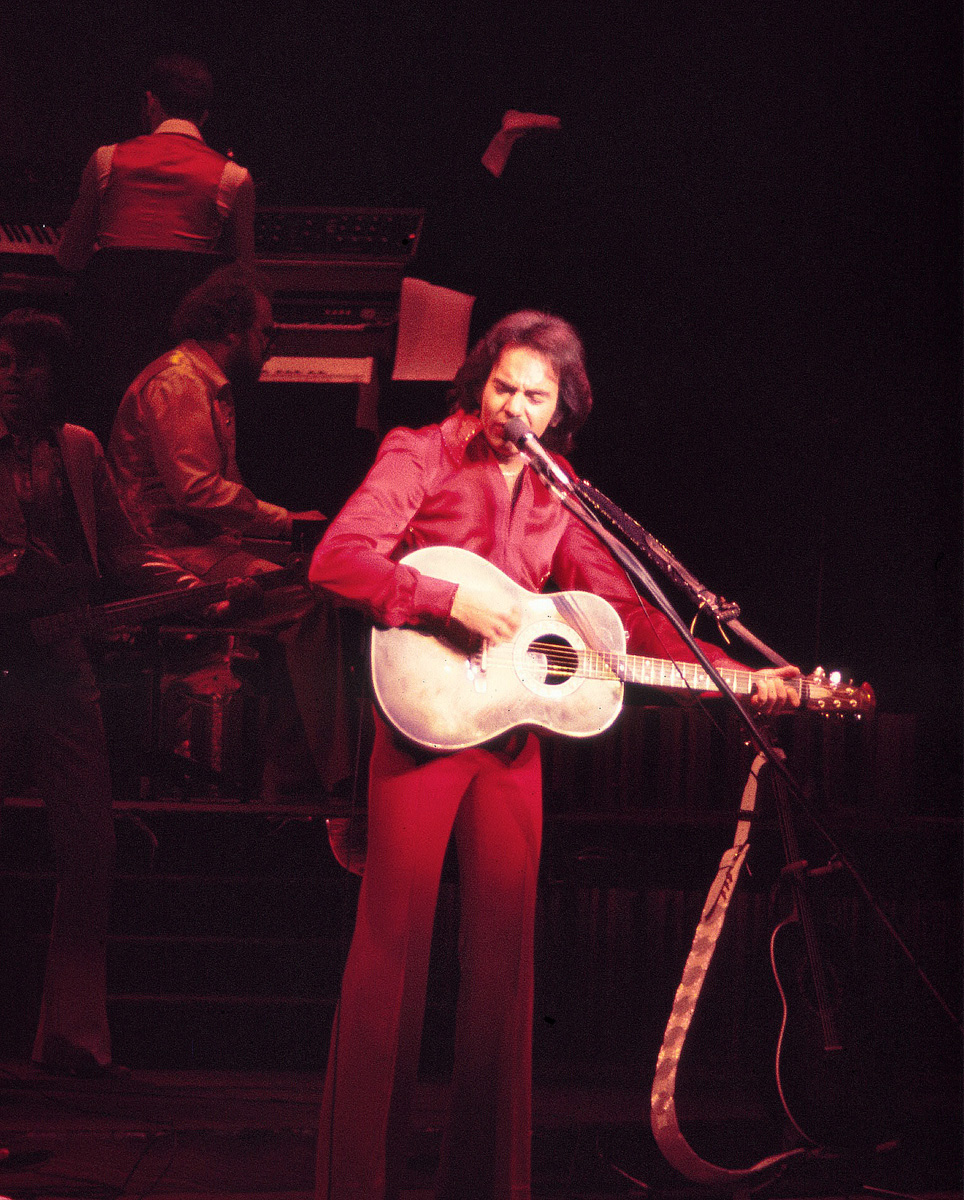
"Song Sung Blue" by Neil Diamond (pictured in 1976) was the year's longest-running number one.

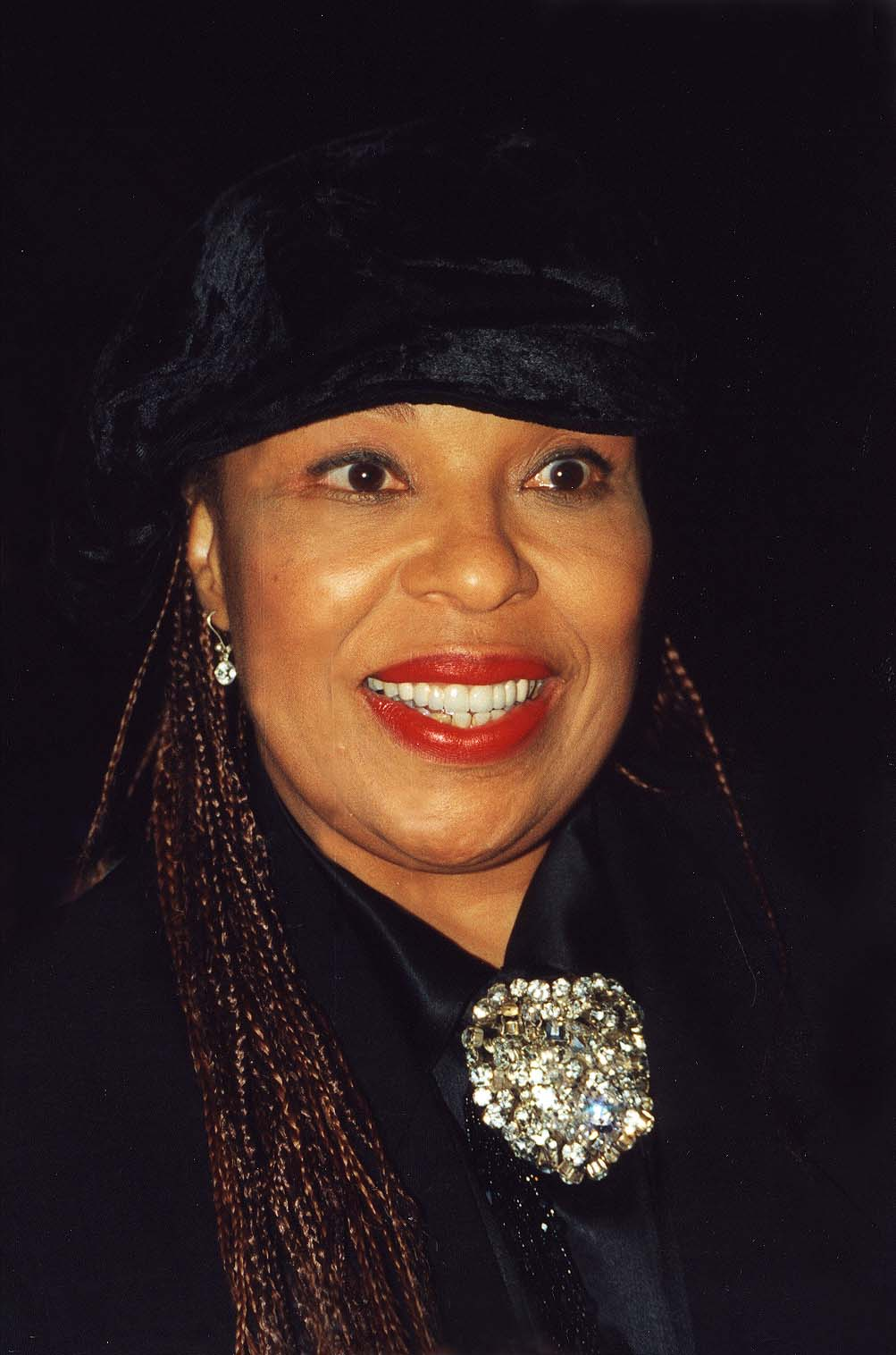
Roberta Flack (pictured in 1995) spent six weeks at number one with "The First Time Ever I Saw Your Face" and had a second number one later in the year collaborating with Donny Hathaway.

Chart history
Issue date	Title	Artist(s)	Ref.
January 1	"An Old Fashioned Love Song"	Three Dog Night	
January 8	"Cherish"	David Cassidy	
January 15	"American Pie"	Don McLean	
January 22	"American Pie"	Don McLean	
January 29	"American Pie"	Don McLean	
February 5	"Hurting Each Other"	The Carpenters	
February 12	"Hurting Each Other"	The Carpenters	
February 19	"Without You"	Nilsson	
February 26	"Without You"	Nilsson	
March 4	"Without You"	Nilsson	
March 11	"Without You"	Nilsson	
March 18	"Without You"	Nilsson	
March 25	"Rock and Roll Lullaby"	B. J. Thomas	
April 1	"The First Time Ever I Saw Your Face"	Roberta Flack	
April 8	"The First Time Ever I Saw Your Face"	Roberta Flack	
April 15	"The First Time Ever I Saw Your Face"	Roberta Flack	
April 22	"The First Time Ever I Saw Your Face"	Roberta Flack	
April 29	"The First Time Ever I Saw Your Face"	Roberta Flack	
May 6	"The First Time Ever I Saw Your Face"	Roberta Flack	
May 13	"Morning Has Broken"	Cat Stevens	
May 20	"The Candy Man"	Sammy Davis Jr.	
May 27	"The Candy Man"	Sammy Davis Jr.	
June 3	"Song Sung Blue"	Neil Diamond	
June 10	"Song Sung Blue"	Neil Diamond	
June 17	"Song Sung Blue"	Neil Diamond	
June 24	"Song Sung Blue"	Neil Diamond	
July 1	"Song Sung Blue"	Neil Diamond	
July 8	"Song Sung Blue"	Neil Diamond	
July 15	"Song Sung Blue"	Neil Diamond	
July 22	"Where Is the Love"	Roberta Flack and Donny Hathaway	
July 29	"Alone Again (Naturally)"	Gilbert O'Sullivan	
August 5	"Alone Again (Naturally)"	Gilbert O'Sullivan	
August 12	"Alone Again (Naturally)"	Gilbert O'Sullivan	
August 19	"Alone Again (Naturally)"	Gilbert O'Sullivan	
August 26	"Alone Again (Naturally)"	Gilbert O'Sullivan	
September 2	"Alone Again (Naturally)"	Gilbert O'Sullivan	
September 9	"The Guitar Man"	Bread	
September 16	"Baby Don't Get Hooked on Me"	Mac Davis	
September 23	"Baby Don't Get Hooked on Me"	Mac Davis	
September 30	"Baby Don't Get Hooked on Me"	Mac Davis	
October 7	"Black and White"	Three Dog Night	
October 14	"Garden Party"	Rick Nelson	
October 21	"Garden Party"	Rick Nelson	
October 28	"If I Could Reach You"	The 5th Dimension	
November 4	"I Can See Clearly Now"	Johnny Nash	
November 11	"I Can See Clearly Now"	Johnny Nash	
November 18	"I Can See Clearly Now"	Johnny Nash	
November 25	"I Can See Clearly Now"	Johnny Nash	
December 2	"I'd Love You to Want Me"	Lobo	
December 9	"Clair"	Gilbert O'Sullivan	
December 16	"Clair"	Gilbert O'Sullivan	
December 23	"Clair"	Gilbert O'Sullivan	
December 30	"Sweet Surrender"	Bread	
