= Diary (Bread song) =

Single by Bread

from the album Baby I'm-a Want You
- B-side: "Down on My Knees"
- Released: April 1972
- Genre: Soft rock
- Length: 3:05
- Label: Elektra
- Songwriter: David Gates
- Producer: David Gates

Bread singles chronology
"Everything I Own" (1972)	"Diary" (1972)	"The Guitar Man" (1972)

"Diary" is a song written and produced by David Gates and released by his band Bread in 1972, both as a single and on the album Baby I'm-a Want You.

In the lyrics, the singer reads his girlfriend's diary thinking she is writing nice things about him until he realizes she is writing about another man.

It spent 11 weeks on the Billboard Hot 100 chart, peaking at No. 15, while reaching No. 3 on Billboard's Easy Listening chart, No. 12 on Canada's RPM 100, and No. 26 on Australia's Go-Set chart. The song was ranked No. 50 on Billboard's year-end ranking of 1972's "Top Easy Listening Singles".

Record World praised the lyrics and called it an "incredibly delicate piece with all the ingredients for a number one hit." Cash Box called it the group's "gentlest" single in a while. Rolling Stone critic David Lubin had a negative opinion, saying that "with its bland melody and an instrument which sounds like it's either an electrified jew's harp or underwater, [Diary] is a melodramatic piece about a fellow who finds and misinterprets the diary of the girl he's in love with, and like a character in an early Gide novel, he pledges his life to her nevertheless."

Classic Rock History critic John Tabacco rated it as Bread's 8th best song, noting that the "sparse" production with "just an acoustic guitar, Gates’s sweet vocals, and an electric guitar with a vibrato effect" was reminiscent of Bread's earlier song "If".

Anita Kerr recorded an easy listening cover of "Diary", which featured Pieter van Vollenhoven on piano, and was released on her 1979 album Together, which reached No. 42 in the Netherlands.

== Chart performance ==
Chart (1972)	Peak position
Australia Go-Set	26
Canada RPM 100	12
New Zealand (Listener)	13
US Billboard Hot 100	15
US Billboard Easy Listening	3
US Cash Box Top 100	15
US Record World The Singles Chart	11
