= Baby I'm-a Want You =

Studio album by Bread
- Released: January 1972
- Recorded: 1971
- Studios: Sound Recorders, Los Angeles; Sound Labs, Los Angeles
- Genre: Soft rock
- Length: 34:52
- Labels: Elektra, re-released on Rhino in 1995, and in 2019 by Mobile Fidelity Sound Labs SACD-Hybrid
- Producer: David Gates

Bread chronology
Manna (1971)	Baby I'm-a Want You (1972)	Guitar Man (1972)

Singles from Baby I'm-a Want You
- 1. "Mother Freedom" Released: July 1971; 2. "Baby I'm-a Want You" Released: October 23, 1971; 3. "Everything I Own" Released: January 29, 1972; 4. "Diary" Released: April 1972

Professional ratings
Review scores
Source	Rating
Allmusic	4.5/5 stars
Rolling Stone	(not rated)

Baby I'm-a Want You is the fourth album by Bread, released in 1972. Its singles included the title cut (which reached No. 3 on the Billboard Top 100), "Everything I Own" (No. 5), "Mother Freedom" (No. 37), and "Diary" (No. 15). The album was certified Gold by the RIAA in March 1972. This was the first Bread album to feature keyboard player Larry Knechtel.

Record World called "Mother Freedom" a "stylistic shift of gears" for Bread in which they "prove they can rock with the best of them."

== Track listing ==
All tracks written by David Gates, except where noted.

Side one

1. "Mother Freedom" – 2:35
2. "Baby I'm-a Want You" – 2:31
3. "Down on My Knees" (James Griffin, Gates) – 2:44
4. "Everything I Own" – 3:07
5. "Nobody Like You" (Larry Knechtel, Griffin) – 3:14
6. "Diary" – 3:09

Side two

7. "Dream Lady" (Griffin, Robb Royer) – 3:22
8. "Daughter" – 3:23
9. "Games of Magic" (Griffin, Royer) – 3:10
10. "This Isn't What the Governmeant" – 2:27
11. "Just Like Yesterday" (Griffin) – 2:15
12. "I Don't Love You" (Griffin) – 2:49

== Personnel ==
- David Gates - vocals, guitars, bass, Moog, violin
- James Griffin - vocals, guitars, piano
- Larry Knechtel - piano, bass, Hammond organ, harmonica, guitars, keyboards
- Mike Botts - drums, percussion
- Robb Royer - bass on "Mother Freedom"

== Charts ==
=== Weekly charts ===
Chart (1972)	Position
Canadian RPM Albums Chart	9
UK Albums Chart	9
US Billboard Top LP's & Tape	3

=== Year-end charts ===
Chart (1972)	Position
US Billboard Top Popular Albums	13

=== Certifications ===
Region	Certification
United States (RIAA)	Gold
