= The Guitar Man =

Single by Bread

from the album Guitar Man
- B-side: "Just Like Yesterday"
- Released: July 1972
- Genre: Soft rock
- Length: 3:46
- Label: Elektra
- Songwriter: David Gates
- Producer: David Gates

Bread singles chronology
"Diary" (1972)	"The Guitar Man" (1972)	"Sweet Surrender" (1972)

"The Guitar Man" is a song written by David Gates and originally recorded by the rock group Bread. It first appeared on Bread's 1972 album, Guitar Man. It is a mixture of the sounds of soft rock, including strings and acoustic guitar, and the addition of a wah-wah effect electric guitar, played by Larry Knechtel. The song peaked at No. 11 on the Billboard Hot 100 chart in the United States and was their third No. 1 hit on the Easy Listening chart (following "If" and "Baby I'm-a Want You").

Record World called it a "superfine superhit" with a "beautiful tune, apt lyric, full, rich production." Cash Box said "this ballad proves [Bread's] versatility and ability to handle a lyric that says a bit more than 'I love you.'" Cash Box also said the song "is about performers, but is bound to be a listener's dream."

== Chart performance ==
Chart (1972)	Peak position
Australia (KMR)	22
Canada Top Singles (RPM)	6
Canada Adult Contemporary (RPM)	7
Ireland (IRMA)	14
New Zealand (Recorded Music NZ)	8
UK Singles (Official Charts)	16
US Billboard Hot 100	11
US Adult Contemporary (Billboard)	1
US Cash Box Top 100	10

== Certifications ==
Certifications for "The Guitar Man"
Region	Certification	Certified units/sales
New Zealand (RMNZ)	Platinum	30,000^{‡}
^{‡} Sales+streaming figures based on certification alone.

== Personnel ==
- David Gates - lead vocals, bass, violin
- James Griffin - acoustic guitar, harmony vocals
- Larry Knechtel - lead guitar
- Mike Botts - drums

== Cover versions ==
The song has been covered by David J on his 2003 album Estranged, Cake on their 2004 album Pressure Chief, Starflyer 59 on their 2007 vinyl collection Ghosts of the Future, Bobby Bare Jr. on his American Bread EP, and Jericho Rosales on his 2009 album Change. Hank Marvin released his album Guitar Man with a cover of the song. In 2012, Wreckless Eric and Amy Rigby recorded a version for a fund raising CD titled Super Hits of the Seventies for radio station WFMU. The song is also featured on Keith Urban's 2026 album, Flow State.

== See also ==
- List of Billboard Easy Listening number ones of 1972
