= On the Waters =

Studio album by Bread
- Released: July 1970
- Recorded: 1970
- Studios: Sound Recorders, Los Angeles
- Genre: Rock
- Length: 37:19
- Label: Elektra
- Producer: Bread

Bread chronology
Bread (1969)	On the Waters (1970)	Manna (1971)

Singles from On the Waters
- 1. "Make It with You" Released: May 1970

On the Waters is the second album by Bread, released in July 1970 on Elektra Records. The album peaked at No. 12 on the US Billboard Top LPs chart and No. 34 on the UK Albums chart. On the Waters was certified Gold in the US by the RIAA.

== Critical reception ==
Professional ratings
Review scores
Source	Rating
AllMusic	4/5 stars
The Rolling Stone Record Guide	1/5 stars

Stephen Thomas Erlewine of AllMusic said, "Of course, this is hardly a hard rock record, but it's a first-class Californian pop record, one that is as blissful as a sunset when it lays [sic] back, and as incandescent as a day at the beach when the tempo is sprightly."

== Singles ==
"Make It with You" peaked at No. 1 on the Billboard Hot 100 and No. 4 on the Billboard Easy Listening chart.

== Track listing ==
Side one

1. "Why Do You Keep Me Waiting" – 2:32 (Griffin, Royer)
2. "Make It with You" – 3:18 (Gates)
3. "Blue Satin Pillow" – 2:29 (Gates)
4. "Look What You've Done" – 3:14 (Griffin, Royer)
5. "I Am That I Am" – 3:20 (Griffin, Royer)
6. "Been Too Long on the Road" – 4:53 (Gates)

Side two

1. "I Want You with Me" – 2:52 (Gates, Griffin)
2. "Coming Apart" – 3:30 (Griffin, Royer)
3. "Easy Love" – 2:28 (Griffin, Royer)
4. "In the Afterglow" – 2:38 (Gates)
5. "Call On Me" – 4:03 (Griffin, Royer)
6. "The Other Side of Life" – 2:02 (Gates)

== Personnel ==
- David Gates – vocals, guitar, bass, keyboards
- James Griffin – vocals, guitar, keyboards, bass
- Robb Royer – guitar, bass, keyboards, flute
- Mike Botts – drums, percussion
