= Guitar Man (Bread album) =

Studio album by Bread
- Released: October 1972
- Recorded: 1972
- Studio: Elektra, Los Angeles, California
- Genre: Rock
- Length: 43:11
- Label: Elektra
- Producer: David Gates

Bread chronology
Baby I'm-a Want You (1972)	Guitar Man (1972)	The Best of Bread (1973)

Singles from Guitar Man
- 1. "The Guitar Man" Released: July 1972; 2. "Sweet Surrender" Released: November 1972; 3. "Aubrey" Released: 1973

Guitar Man is the fifth album by Bread, released in 1972.

The album produced three U.S. Top 20 singles: "The Guitar Man" (No. 11), "Sweet Surrender" (No. 15), and "Aubrey" (No. 15).

Guitar Man peaked at No. 18 on the Billboard 200.

== Critical reception ==
Professional ratings
Review scores
Source	Rating
AllMusic	3/5 stars
The Encyclopedia of Popular Music	4/5 stars
MusicHound Rock: The Essential Album Guide	4/5 stars
The New Rolling Stone Record Guide	4/5 stars
The Rolling Stone Album Guide	3/5 stars

Billboard called the album a "dynamite program," writing that "Aubrey" "is superb." The New Rolling Stone Record Guide deemed it a "classic" album, writing that "it's pop, but transcendent pop." The Birmingham Post wrote that the highlights "are, not surprisingly, the Gates' compositions, 'Sweet Surrender', 'Aubrey' and the title track, three of the strongest songs he ever contributed to the band."

== Track listing ==
All tracks written by David Gates, except where noted.

Side one

1. "Welcome to the Music" – 2:57
2. "The Guitar Man" – 3:46
3. "Make It by Yourself" – 3:50 (Gates, Griffin)
4. "Aubrey" – 3:39
5. "Fancy Dancer" – 3:33 (Botts, Griffin)
6. "Sweet Surrender" – 2:38

Side two

1. "Tecolote" – 4:35
2. "Let Me Go" – 3:27 (Griffin, Royer)
3. "Yours for Life" – 3:21
4. "Picture in Your Mind" – 4:42 (Knechtel)
5. "Don't Tell Me No" – 3:34 (Griffin, Royer)
6. "Didn't Even Know Her Name" – 3:09 (Gates, Griffin)

== Personnel ==
- David Gates – vocals, guitars, bass, keyboards, violin, Moog
- Jimmy Griffin – vocals, guitars, piano
- Larry Knechtel – piano, bass, organ, harmonica, guitars, miscellaneous keyboards
- Mike Botts – drums, percussion
