= Lost Without Your Love =

Studio album by Bread
- Released: January 1977
- Recorded: 1976
- Studio: Elektra, Los Angeles, California
- Genre: Soft rock
- Label: Elektra, re-released on Wounded Bird in 2007
- Producer: David Gates

Bread chronology
The Best of Bread, Volume 2 (1974)	Lost Without Your Love (1977)	The Sound of Bread (1982)

Singles from Lost Without Your Love
- 1. "Lost Without Your Love" Released: November 1976; 2. "Hooked on You" Released: April 1977

Professional ratings
Review scores
Source	Rating
AllMusic	2/5 stars
Rolling Stone	(not rated)

Lost Without Your Love is the sixth and final studio album by Bread, released in 1977. The title track became the group's sixth and final top 10 hit, reaching number nine on the US Billboard Hot 100 in February 1977. "Hooked on You", the follow-up single, subsequently reached number 60.

== Track listing ==
1. "Hooked on You" – 2:18 (Gates)
2. "She's the Only One" – 3:00 (Griffin, Royer)
3. "Lost Without Your Love" – 2:56 (Gates)
4. "Change of Heart" – 3:18 (Gates, Griffin)
5. "Belonging" – 3:17 (Gates)
6. "Fly Away" – 3:05 (Griffin, Royer)
7. "Lay Your Money Down" – 2:41 (Gates)
8. "The Chosen One" – 4:40 (Gates)
9. "Today's the First Day" – 3:24 (Griffin, Royer)
10. "Hold Tight" – 3:05 (Gates)
11. "Our Lady of Sorrow" – 4:14 (Griffin, Royer)

== Personnel ==
- David Gates - vocals, guitar, bass, keyboards
- James Griffin - vocals, guitar, keyboards
- Larry Knechtel - keyboards, bass, guitar
- Mike Botts - drums

=== Additional personnel ===
- Dean Parks – guitar
- Michael Boddicker – synthesizers
- Tom Scott - saxophone, woodwinds

== Certifications ==
Region	Certification	Certified units/sales
Australia (ARIA)	Gold	20,000^{^}
^{^} Shipments figures based on certification alone.
