= Bread (album) =

Studio album by Bread
- Released: September 1969
- Recorded: 1969
- Studios: Elektra, Hollywood, California
- Genre: Soft rock
- Length: 35:29
- Label: Elektra
- Producer: Bread

Bread chronology
Bread (1969)	On the Waters (1970)

Singles from Bread
- 1. "Dismal Day" Released: June 1969; 2. "Could I" Released: July 1969; 3. "It Don't Matter to Me" Released: September 1970 (different recording than on album)

Professional ratings
Review scores
Source	Rating
AllMusic	4.5/5 stars
Rolling Stone	(favorable)
The Village Voice	C−

Bread is the debut album by soft rock band Bread, released in August 1969 on Elektra Records. This album has been certified Double Platinum in Australia by the ARIA.

== Overview ==
Produced by Bread themselves, this album was recorded at Elektra Sound Recorders, Hollywood, California. It featured session drummer Jim Gordon, and was engineered by Bruce Botnick.

== Critical reception ==
Stephen Thomas Erlewine of Allmusic described the album as "effectively the birth of Californian soft rock, as David Gates and compatriots blend the folk-rock of the Byrds and Buffalo Springfield with a distinctly British melodicism and a streak of sentimentality borrowed from McCartney. The result is a modest little gem, with more strange turns than you'd expect from their reputation -- including soaring falsettos, spiraling melodies, rough guitars, and, best of all, a set of tightly-written, appealing songs."

== Track listing ==
Side one

1. "Dismal Day" (Gates) – 2:21
2. "London Bridge" (Gates) – 2:32
3. "Could I" (Griffin, Royer) – 3:31
4. "Look at Me" (Gates) – 2:43
5. "The Last Time" (Griffin, Royer) – 4:10
6. "Any Way You Want Me" (Griffin, Royer) – 3:16

Side two

1. "Move Over" (Griffin) – 2:36
2. "Don't Shut Me Out" (Gates) – 2:39
3. "You Can't Measure the Cost" (Gates) – 3:22
4. "Family Doctor" (Griffin, Royer) – 2:15
5. "It Don't Matter to Me" (Gates) – 2:41
6. "Friends and Lovers" (Griffin, Royer, Tim Hallinan) – 3:54

== Personnel ==
=== Bread ===
- David Gates – lead vocals, guitars, bass, organ, piano, RMI electric piano, Moog synthesizer, violin, viola, percussion
- James Griffin – lead vocals, guitars, percussion
- Robb Royer – backing vocals, guitar, bass, RMI electric piano, piano, flute, recorder, percussion

=== Additional personnel ===
- Jim Gordon – drums
- Ron Edgar – drums (demos)

== Production ==
- Producer: Bread
- Engineer: Bruce Botnick
- Production supervisor: Jac Holzman
- Art direction: William S. Harvey, Coco Shinomiya
- Cover art concept: William S. Harvey
- Cover art: Abe Gurvin
- Design: Bryan Rackleff
- Photography: Ed Caraeff
- Liner Notes: Barry Alfonso

== Charts ==
Chart (1969)	Position
US Pop Albums	127

== Certifications ==
Region	Certification	Certified units/sales
Australia (ARIA)	2× Platinum	140,000^{^}
^{^} Shipments figures based on certification alone.
