= Manna (album) =

Studio album by Bread
- Released: March 1971
- Recorded: 1971
- Studio: Sound Recorders, Hollywood
- Genre: Rock
- Length: 36:07
- Label: Elektra, re-released on Rhino in 1995
- Producer: Bread

Bread chronology
On the Waters (1970)	Manna (1971)	Baby I'm-a Want You (1972)

Singles from Manna
- 1. "Let Your Love Go" Released: 1971; 2. "If" Released: March 21, 1971

Professional ratings
Review scores
Source	Rating
Allmusic	4.5/5 stars
Rolling Stone	(not rated)

Manna is the third studio album by American soft rock band Bread, released in 1971 on Elektra Records. The album peaked at No. 21 on the US Billboard 200. Manna has also been certified Gold in the US by the RIAA.

== Critical reception ==
Lester Bangs of Rolling Stone declared, "The new one offers no surprises. One nice thing about Bread is that they're totally professional, and as Mellow as most of the music is these days, they never cop out to sheer sloppiness...They've got standards and they sing with feeling, and maybe that's enough right now."

Stephen Thomas Erlewine of Allmusic gave a 4.5/5 stars rating saying, "Bread's third album, Manna, isn't so much a step forward as it is a consolidation of strengths, as the group sharpens their skills and carves out their own identities...it results in a fine listen, especially since the group's songwriting remains at the high standard instituted on that first Bread album."

== Singles ==
The singles "Let Your Love Go" and "If" were released from this album. Record World said "Let Your Love Go" has a "heavier sound than usual from [the] group." Cash Box said that it "brings a new strength to the act's vocal sound, rumpling a bit of the letter-perfect smoothness of their first two hits."

== Track listing ==
Side one

1. "Let Your Love Go" (David Gates) – 2:25
2. "Take Comfort" (James Griffin, Robb Royer) – 3:33
3. "Too Much Love" (Griffin, Royer) – 2:46
4. "If" (Gates) – 2:36
5. "Be Kind to Me" (Griffin, Royer) – 3:04
6. "He's a Good Lad" (Gates) – 2:59

Side two

7. "She Was My Lady" (Gates) – 2:51
8. "Live in Your Love" (Griffin, Royer) – 2:46
9. "What a Change" (Gates) – 3:40
10. "I Say Again" (Griffin, Royer) – 2:52
11. "Come Again" (Gates) – 4:03
12. "Truckin'" (Griffin, Royer) – 2:32

== Personnel ==
- David Gates - vocals, guitar, piano, keyboards, harmonica, violin, bass
- James Griffin - vocals, guitar, keyboards
- Robb Royer - guitar, bass, keyboards, backing vocals
- Mike Botts - drums, percussion

== Charts ==
=== Weekly charts ===
Chart (1971)	Position
Canadian RPM Albums Chart	16
U.S. Billboard 200	21

=== Year-end charts ===
Chart (1971)	Position
U.S. Billboard Pop Albums	80

== Certifications ==
Region	Certification
United States (RIAA)	Gold
