= Mike Botts =

American drummer (1944–2005)

Background information
- Birth name: Michael Gene Botts
- Born: December 8, 1944; Oakland, California, U.S.
- Died: December 9, 2005 (aged 61); Burbank, California, U.S.
- Occupation: Drummer
- Formerly of: Bread

Michael Gene Botts (December 8, 1944 – December 9, 2005) was an American drummer, best known for his work with 1970s soft rock band Bread, and as a session musician. During his career, he recorded with Linda Ronstadt, Karla Bonoff, Andrew Gold, Olivia Newton-John, Peter Cetera, Anne Murray, Warren Zevon and Dan Fogelberg, among many others. He also contributed to several soundtracks for films, and to albums released under the name of The Simpsons. Although known primarily as a drummer, Botts also contributed backing vocals to some Bread songs.

== Career ==
Born in Oakland, California, Botts grew up in nearby Antioch before moving to Sacramento. While in college, he began playing with a band called The Travellers Three and working as a studio musician. Eventually, the group disbanded, but not before recording some songs with producer David Gates.

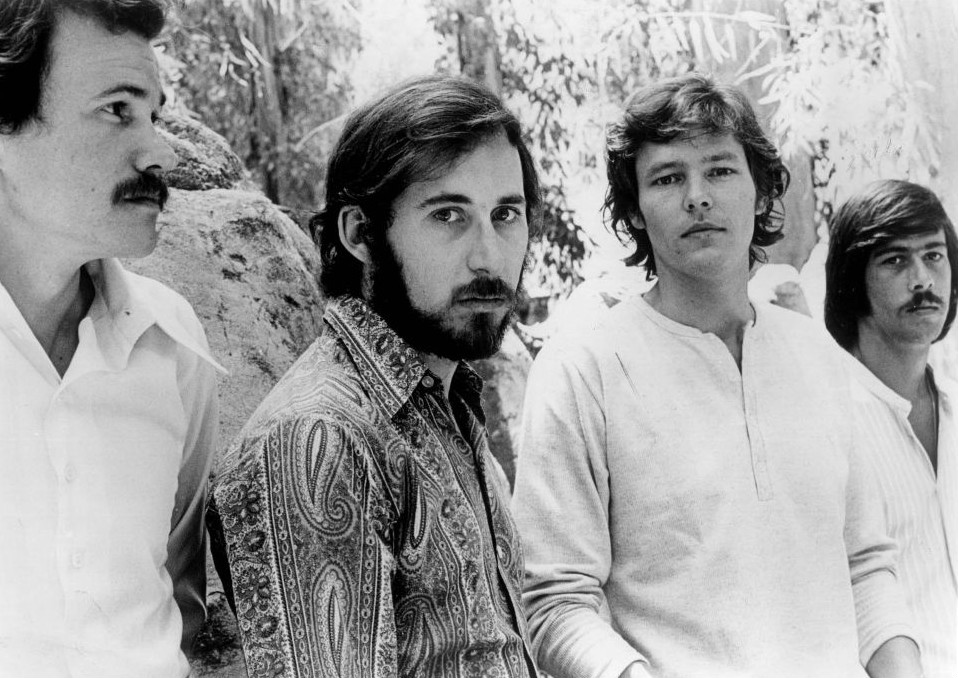
Mike Botts (first from right) as part of the band Bread in 1971

While working with Bill Medley, Botts was invited to join Gates's band, Bread, for its second album, On the Waters. He accepted the offer and worked as a full-time member of Bread from 1970 to 1973, when the band went on hiatus. At that point, Botts began working with Linda Ronstadt, and recorded and toured with her for over two years. Botts reunited with the other members of Bread in 1976 for one final album and tour, before disbanding again in 1978.

He then worked with Karla Bonoff and Andrew Gold, playing on Gold's 1977 hit "Lonely Boy", and continued to work in the studio as a player, singer, writer, and producer. In 1989, he toured Japan with Richard Carpenter. Two years later, he began touring and recording with Dan Fogelberg while continuing his session work, and also writing jingles and music for children's albums. In 1996, the members of Bread again reunited for a world tour that ran until the fall of 1997. Botts then recorded his only solo album, Adults Only, released in 2000.

Botts died in Burbank, California, one day after his 61st birthday, having suffered from colon cancer.

== Discography ==
- Joshua Fox – Joshua Fox (1968)
- Tommy Flanders – Moonstone (1969)
- Glenda Griffith – Glenda Griffith (1969)
- Mary McCaslin – Goodnight Everybody (1969)
- Dick Rosmini – A Genuine Rosmini (1969)
- Bread – On the Waters (1970)
- Johnny Darrell – California Stop-Over (1970)
- Ananda Shankar – Ananda Shankar (1970)
- Bread – Manna (1971)
- Cyrus Faryar – Cyrus (1971)
- Bread – Baby I'm-a Want You (1972)
- Bread – Guitar Man (1972)
- Malvina Reynolds – Malvina (1972)
- Linda Ronstadt – Linda Ronstadt (1972)
- Stephen Cohn – Stephen Cohn (1973)
- Cyrus Faryar – Islands (1973)
- David Gates – First (1973)
- Richard Ruskin – Richard Ruskin (1973)
- Andrew Gold – Andrew Gold (1975)
- Malvina Reynolds – Held Over (1975)
- Rick Ruskin – Microphone Fever (1975)
- Hoyt Axton – Fearless (1976)
- Andrew Gold – What's Wrong with This Picture? (1976)
- Linda Ronstadt – Hasten Down the Wind (1976)
- JD Souther – Black Rose (1976)
- Wendy Waldman – Main Refrain (1976)
- Hoyt Axton – Road Songs (1977)
- Joan Baez – Blowin' Away (1977)
- Karla Bonoff – Karla Bonoff (1977)
- Bread – Lost Without Your Love (1977)
- Chi Coltrane – Road to Tomorrow (1977)
- Peter McCann – Peter McCann (1977)
- Eric Carmen – Change of Heart (1978)
- Kerry Chater – Love on a Shoestring (1978)
- David Gates – Goodbye Girl (1978)
- Jimmy Griffin – James Griffin (1978)
- Michael Murphey – Lone Wolf (1978)
- Olivia Newton-John – Totally Hot (1978)
- Shawn Phillips – Transcendence (1978)
- Barry Volk – Do What You Like (1978)
- Hoyt Axton – A Rusty Old Halo (1979)
- David Gates – Falling in Love Again (1979)
- Andrew Gold – Whirlwind (1979)
- Peter McCann – One on One (1979)
- Michael Murphey – Peaks, Valleys, Honky Tonks & Alleys (1979)
- Dan Peek – All Things Are Possible (1979)
- JD Souther – You're Only Lonely (1979)
- John Stewart – Bombs Away Dream Babies (1979)
- Coast to Coast – Original Soundtrack (1980)
- John Farrar – John Farrar (1980)
- Johnny Lee – Lookin' for Love (1980)
- Mary MacGregor – Mary MacGregor (1980)
- The Ozark Mountain Daredevils – Ozark Mountain Daredevils (1980)
- Urban Cowboy – Original Soundtrack (1980)
- Peter Cetera – Peter Cetera (1981)
- The Chipmunks – Urban Chipmunk (1981)
- Rita Coolidge – Heartbreak Radio (1981)
- Albert Hammond – Your World and My World (1981)
- Dan Hill – Partial Surrender (1981)
- Quarterflash – Quarterflash (1981)
- Hoyt Axton – Pistol Packin' Mama (1982)
- Nicolette Larson – All Dressed Up and No Place to Go (1982)
- Moon Martin – Mystery Ticket (1982)
- Michael Martin Murphey – Michael Martin Murphey (1982)
- Glenn Shorrock – Villain of the Peace (1982)
- Warren Zevon – The Envoy (1982)
- Eddie Money – Where's the Party? (1983)
- Sharon O'Neill – Foreign Affairs (1983)
- Brock Walsh – Dateline: Tokyo (1983)
- Footloose – Original Soundtrack (1984)
- Mickey Gilley – Too Good to Stop Now (1984)
- Air Supply – Hearts in Motion (1986)
- Eikichi Yazawa – Flash in Japan (1987)
- The Simpsons – The Simpsons Sing the Blues (1990)
- Dan Fogelberg – Dan Fogelberg Live: Greetings from the West (1991)
- Parachute Express – Circle of Friends (1991)
- Parachute Express – Sunny Side Up (1991)
- Parachute Express – Happy to Be Here (1991)
- Rox Diamond – Rox Diamond (1992)
- Dan Fogelberg – River of Souls (1993)
- Alvin and the Chipmunks – A Very Merry Chipmunk (1994)
- Kermit & Friends – Kermit Unpigged (1994)
- Maureen McCormick – When You Get a Little Lonely (1995)
- Nelson – Because They Can (1995)
- Eliza Gilkyson – Redemption Road (1997)
- The Simpsons – The Yellow Album (1998)
- Batman Beyond – TV Soundtrack (1999)
- Mike Botts – Adults Only (2000)
- Dan Fogelberg – Live: Something Old New Borrowed & Some Blues (2000)
