= Robb Royer =

American musician and songwriter (born 1942)

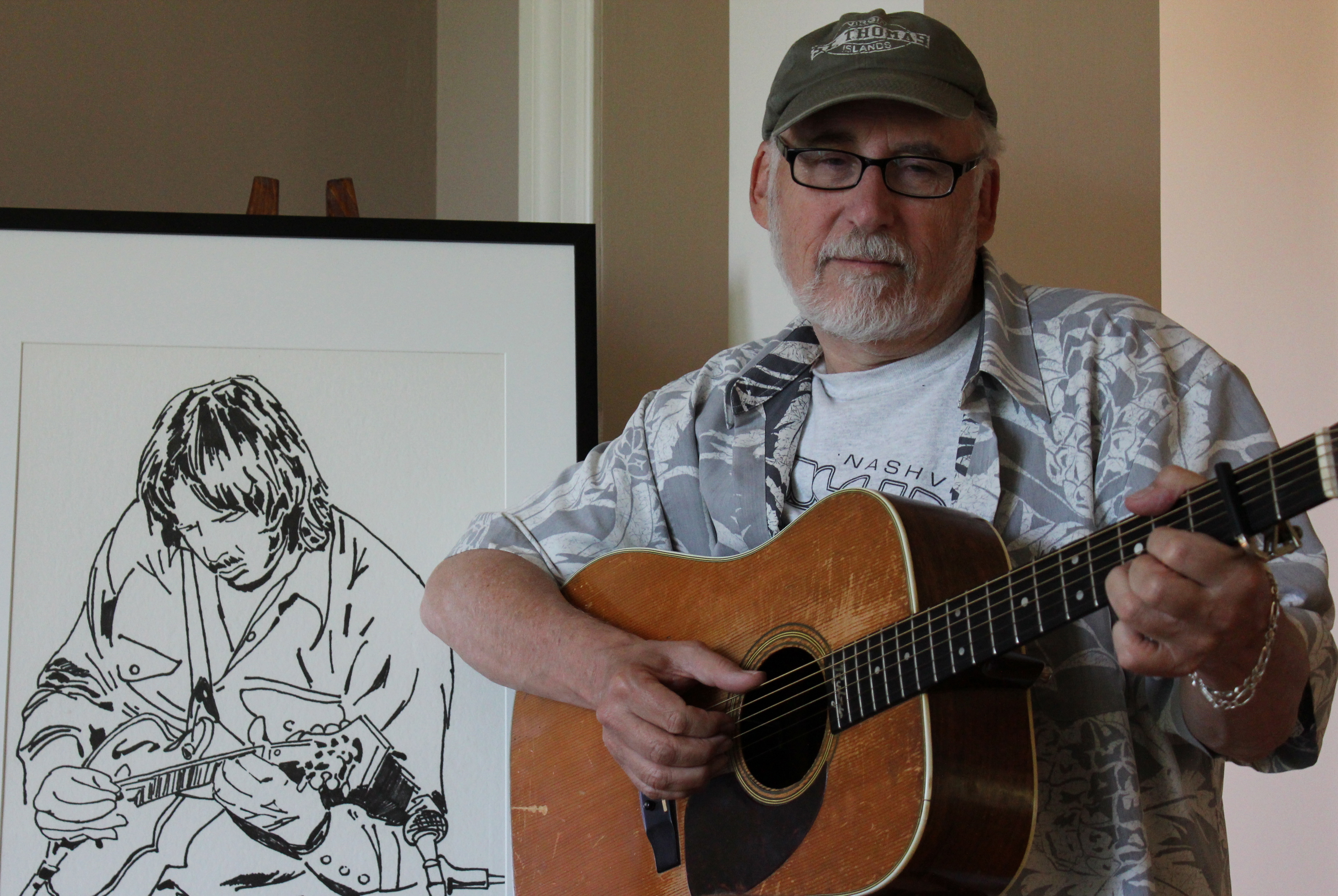
- Royer in 2011

Background information
- Born: Robert Wilson Royer; December 6, 1942 (age 83); Los Angeles, California, U.S.
- Genres: Pop, soft rock, country
- Occupations: Musician, songwriter, screenwriter
- Instruments: Vocals, guitar
- Years active: 1964–present
- Formerly of: Bread

Robert Wilson Royer (born December 6, 1942, in Los Angeles) is an American musician and songwriter, best known as a founding member of the soft rock band Bread from 1968 to 1971. While he was with the band, they had a UK #5/US #1 hit single with "Make It with You". He was replaced by Larry Knechtel in 1971.

In 1970, Royer and Jimmy Griffin, under the pseudonyms Robb Wilson and Arthur James, wrote the lyrics for "For All We Know", featured in the film Lovers and Other Strangers. It won the Academy Award for Best Original Song and was a top ten hit for the Carpenters in March and April 1971.

Before co-founding Bread, Royer had been a member of the band the Pleasure Fair, whose only album in 1967 was produced and arranged by David Gates, Royer's future bandmate in Bread. His songwriting credits include works for Jimmy Griffin, Ray Charles, the Remingtons, Mary Chapin Carpenter, John Michael Montgomery, Randy Travis, Billy Burnette, the Finnigan Brothers (Mike Finnigan) and others.

== Career ==
=== Early interests in music ===
Robb Royer was exposed to recordings of classical music from early childhood and in Junior High school he pursued playing clarinet in the band. He attended and graduated from Sierra High School in Tollhouse, California. While there he briefly participated in marching band but preferred to focus on the music rather than the marching. During his senior year he participated in concert band playing alto saxophone.

Royer obtained his first guitar when he was a 19-year-old sophomore at San Fernando Valley State College (now California State University, Northridge). He met Tim Hallinan at the school. "Finally, when I began playing guitar, the scales tipped and Tim saw reason to talk to me. He liked to sing and I liked to play."

The two began to perform together as "Robb & Tim" and then later added the talent of Michele Cochrane. Hallinan recalled "What I remember best about Michele was, first, that she could actually sing. I was just faking it, doing what I've done since I was born, an approach to life that begins with the words, 'Act like you can –' In this case, it was sing. But Michele actually could; she had a glorious voice."

=== The Pleasure Fair ===
Soon the trio became a quartet with the addition of Stephen Cohn, who had previously graduated from Valley State's music department, giving a senior recital in classical guitar. The group called themselves by various names, the most notable being the Pleasure Fair and by 1966 they managed to obtain a recording contract for a single with Hanna Barbera Records under the name the Rainy Day People. "Junior Executive" was the A-side, backed with "I'm Telling It to You" (both songs written by Cohn, Hallinan and Royer).

A year later, the group signed a recording contract with Uni Records in 1967. David Gates was hired as the arranger and conductor for the Pleasure Fair's self-titled album.

Royer's song "Say What You See" (co-written with Tim Hallinan) would end up in 1968 being produced by Jimmy Griffin and arranged by David Gates. It was sung by a trio calling itself the Curtain Calls. Soon afterward in the same year, the three founding members of Bread (Royer, Griffin and Gates) would combine forces as their own group.

=== Jimmy Griffin collaborations ===
Robb Royer met Jimmy Griffin through a mutual friend, Maria Yolanda Aguayo, who would later become Griffin's wife. Initially Griffin asked Royer to help with writing horn parts for a music course that Griffin was taking. Soon Royer and Griffin were working together as staff songwriters for Viva Publishing. Jimmy Griffin had been hired by Viva first and was originally supposed to write with another Viva writer, but preferred working with Royer. Griffin soon forced the issue with Viva when he asked if they wanted only half of the publishing rights or all of the rights, resulting in Viva hiring Royer by 1967. Griffin earned $75 a week (US$724 in 2025 dollars) and Royer received $50 a week (US$483 in 2025 dollars), but those salaries were sufficient to pay the rent at that time (Royer's rent for his L.A. apartment was $80 a month in 1967).

Royer and Griffin, using the pseudonyms Robb Wilson and Arthur James, wrote the lyrics for "For All We Know", featured in the film Lovers and Other Strangers which won the Academy Award for Best Song. The song has charted three times, first by the Carpenters in 1971 which reached number one on the Adult Contemporary chart (#3 on the Billboard Hot 100), then by Shirley Bassey also in 1971 which reached number six on the UK charts, and by Nicki French (1995) reaching number 42 in the UK.

Royer and Griffin would continue to write and collaborate on various projects until Griffin's death in 2005.

==== Bread ====
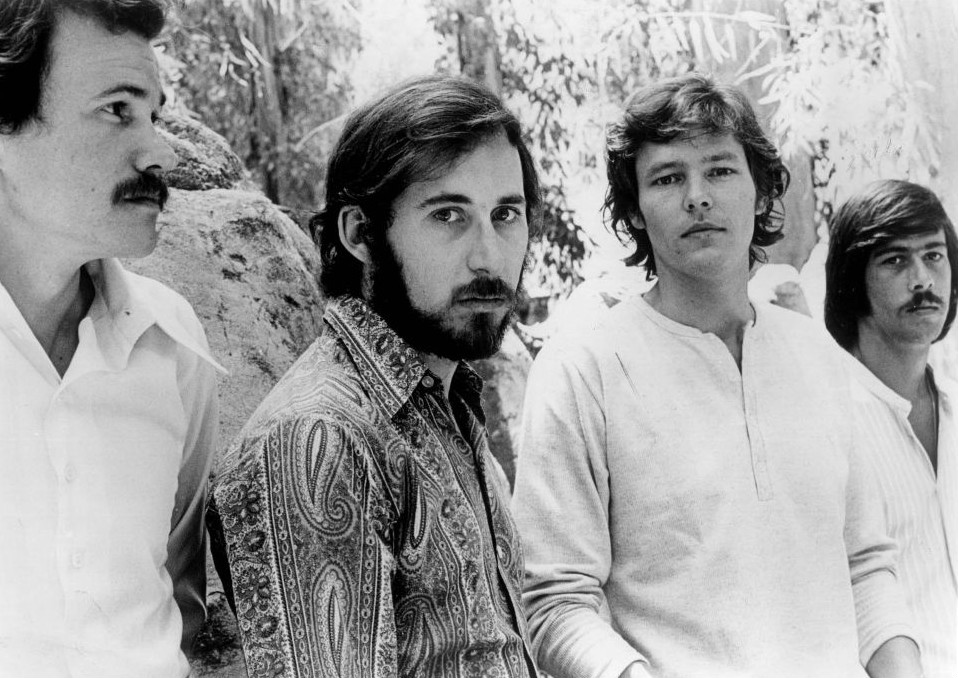
Robb Royer (second from left) as part of the band Bread in 1971

Robb Royer and Jimmy Griffin co-founded Bread with David Gates in 1968. Maria Yolanda Aguayo once again contributed to the band's history when she revealed a trend she noticed as (record producer) Gary Usher's desk girl at CBS Records – band managers generally waited in the lobby but attorneys generally had immediate access to the executives at CBS. The trio hired Al Schlesinger to represent them and he pitched their group to three labels in their search of a recording contract: Elektra Records, the Beatles' Apple Records and Atlantic Records, but Apple did not have clear leadership and was quickly eliminated from the process while Atlantic had recently signed two supergroups – Crosby Stills & Nash and Led Zeppelin – and they were based on the East Coast. Elektra was the label for the Doors, but was becoming embroiled in Jim Morrison's legal battles. When both Atlantic and Elektra offered recording deals to Bread, the group chose the Elektra deal because they had a local headquarters in Los Angeles and the group felt Elektra would more actively promote them, given Atlantic's other recent signings.

The first album made use of Jimmy Gordon's drumming and Gordon also performed drums with the group during its initial gigs, but due to Gordon's high demand among multiple recording artists and his participation with the artists that eventually became Derek and the Dominos, he was replaced with Mike Botts as the group's regular drummer, thus expanding the band to a quartet.

After three years, Robb Royer and David Gates came to a breaking point because Gates wanted more control of the group, so Royer left the group in 1971 after their third album Manna and was replaced with session keyboardist/bassist/guitarist Larry Knechtel, who had previously contributed the piano performance on Simon and Garfunkel's "Bridge Over Troubled Water". Royer continued to write with Griffin and Bread continued to record Royer/Griffin collaborations.

==== Griffin and Knechtel ====
Bread disbanded in 1973 and Jimmy, Larry and Robb ended up working together, releasing one album with Polydor Records in 1973 under the name James Griffin & Co., although none of their songs charted. The trio began work on a second album but it was completed by other producers and released in Europe.

==== Toast/Radio Dixie ====
In 1982, Royer wrote the song "Quittin' Time" (co-written with Roger Linn) which eight years later was recorded by Mary Chapin Carpenter and won an ASCAP Airplay award. Royer traveled to Nashville to receive the award and stayed with Griffin, who had previously relocated from L.A. to Nashville. Larry Knechtel had also been living and working as a session musician in Nashville. Royer relocated to Nashville in 1994.

Todd Cerney was already a Grammy-nominated songwriter when Royer met him in 1994 at Jim Della Croce's house. Cerney had written two top-forty songs (Loverboy's "Notorious" and Restless Heart's "I'll Still Be Loving You" which reached number one on the Country charts). Cerney had established a private recording studio in his home where he engineered a number of other singer-songwriters' albums.

Griffin, Royer and Cerney first collaborated by co-writing the song "Kyrie" in 1994. Knechtel later joined the trio and together they performed and co-wrote songs (including the 1995 song "Slow Train") under the band name Toast. Toast performed at various Nashville venues including the Bluebird, Third and Lindsley, and 12th & Porter. They wrote and performed their own songs including such titles as "Road Kill", "Knechtelodeon", "No More Smokin'", "Grenadine", "Magdelena", and "Radio Dixie". The group used session drummers for their recordings and performances. The group would later be known as Radio Dixie in 1998. The name change was intended to help with promotion of the group, but the group disbanded by the end of 1998. Royer and Cerney continued to write together, generating additional titles including "Hurtin' Cowboy", "New Orleans Prayer", "I Believe I Kissed an Angel", and "Beside Myself".

==== Cosmo and Robetta ====
Robb Royer, fulfilling a deathbed wish from Jimmy Griffin, completed in 2010 a project begun by the two in 1973 after Bread's first breakup. A mix of rock opera and radio "Theater of the Mind", the project is a dramatic narration completed with sound effects and music which tells the story of Cosmo, an electronics whiz who is the sole human employee of Savage motors. In his spare time he has built Robetta, a robot who later becomes nearly human in appearance and abilities. The project was an expansion of an earlier work, "The Plastic Sibling", co-written by Robb alongside a number of college friends, including Tim Hallinan.

=== Additional songwriting ===
Royer collaborated with Richard Fagan to write "Sold (The Grundy County Auction Incident)" which was recorded by John Michael Montgomery and became a number one Billboard Country chart hit in 1995.
