= Baby I'm-a Want You (song) =

Single by Bread

from the album Baby I'm-a Want You
- B-side: "Truckin'"
- Released: 23 October 1971
- Genre: Soft rock; easy listening
- Length: 2:25
- Label: Elektra
- Songwriter: David Gates
- Producer: David Gates

Bread singles chronology
"Mother Freedom" (1971)	"Baby I'm-a Want You" (1971)	"Everything I Own" (1972)

"Baby I'm-a Want You" is a song by American soft rock band Bread. The single was released in October 1971 and became the title track for the album of the same name, released in January 1972.

It was one of Bread's highest-charting singles in both the U.S. and the UK. In the U.S., it reached No. 3 on the Billboard Hot 100 chart in November 1971, the third of Bread's four top-five hits ("Make It with You", No. 1 in 1970; "If", No. 4 earlier in 1971; and "Everything I Own", from the same album, No. 5 in 1972). "Baby I'm-a Want You" reached the top of the Easy Listening chart and rose to No. 14 on the UK Singles Chart in February 1972.

Composed in the key of Ab major, the song employs the often used I-ii-IV-V chord progression.

Billboard called it a "powerful ballad performance." Cash Box called it a "soft ballad [that] returns Bread to their original sound." Record World said that with this song "Bread returns to its original hit sound" and "the guys should skyrocket back to the upper chart regions."

It was certified as a gold record by the RIAA. As with virtually all of the band's well-known recordings, the song was both written and produced by the band's lead vocalist, David Gates.

== Chart history ==
=== Weekly charts ===
Chart (1971–1972)	Peak position
Australia (Kent Music Report)	8
Canada RPM Top Singles	5
UK Singles Chart	14
U.S. Billboard Hot 100	3
U.S. Billboard Adult Contemporary	1
U.S. Cash Box Top 100	3

=== Year-end charts ===
Chart (1971)	Rank
U.S. (Joel Whitburn's Pop Annual)	37

Chart (1972)	Rank
Australia	57

== See also ==
- List of number-one adult contemporary singles of 1971 (U.S.)
