= Aubrey (song) =

- Dutch single release

Single by Bread

from the album Guitar Man
- B-side: "Didn't Even Know Her Name"
- Released: 1973
- Recorded: 1972
- Genre: Soft rock
- Length: 3:39
- Label: Elektra
- Songwriter: David Gates
- Producer: David Gates

Bread singles chronology
| "Sweet Surrender" (1972) | "Aubrey" (1973) | "Lost Without Your Love" (1976) |

"Aubrey" is a song written and composed by American singer-songwriter David Gates, and originally recorded by the soft rock band Bread, of which Gates was the leader and primary music producer. It appeared on Bread's 1972 album Guitar Man. The single lasted 11 weeks on the Billboard Hot 100 chart, peaking at number 15. In Canada, the song reached only number 41 on the pop singles chart, but reached number 6 on the adult contemporary chart. In New Zealand, "Aubrey" reached number 8.

== Background ==
David Gates wrote the song after watching Breakfast at Tiffany's starring Audrey Hepburn.

== Chart history ==
Chart performance for "Aubrey"
| Chart | Peak |
|---|---|
| New Zealand (Listener) | 8 |
| US Billboard Hot 100 | 15 |
| US Cash Box Top 100 | 11 |

== Legacy ==
Actress Aubrey Plaza is named after this song.

== Cover versions ==
- "Aubrey" was covered by jazz saxophonist Grover Washington, Jr. on his 1973 album Soul Box.
- "Aubrey" was later recorded by Perry Como and included on his 1973 album And I Love You So.
- "Aubrey" was covered by Joanna Wang on her 2009 album Joanna & 王若琳.
- Scarborough Faire included an instrumental version of "Aubrey" on their self-titled album in 2011.

== Sampling ==
A soul-jazz interpretation of the main melody from Washington's cover was sampled in the 1998 song "Step to My Girl" by Oakland-based hip-hop group Souls of Mischief. This version provided inspiration in turn for the song "Step" by American indie rock band Vampire Weekend.
