= Everything I Own =

1972 single by Bread

Single by Bread

from the album Baby I'm-a Want You
- B-side: "I Don't Love You"
- Released: January 29, 1972
- Recorded: 1971
- Genre: Soft rock; easy listening; pop
- Length: 3:07
- Label: Elektra
- Songwriter: David Gates
- Producer: David Gates

Bread singles chronology
"Baby I'm-a Want You" (1971)	"Everything I Own" (1972)	"Diary" (1972)

Music video
- "Everything I Own" on YouTube

"Everything I Own" is a song by soft rock band Bread and appeared on their 1972 album Baby I'm-a Want You. The song was written by band member David Gates. It reached No. 5 on the American Billboard Hot 100. Billboard ranked it as the No. 52 song for 1972. "Everything I Own" also reached No. 5 in Canada and No. 12 in Australia.

== Composition ==
Although initial listeners may have interpreted it as a song about a broken relationship, David Gates revealed that it was written in memory of his father who died in 1963 before he achieved his success with Bread. According to the book 1000 UK No. 1 Hits by Jon Kutner and Spencer Leigh, at his father's funeral, a friend took David Gates aside and said, "Your dad was so proud of what you were doing." David agreed, "My success would have been so special to him as he was my greatest influence. So I decided to write and record 'Everything I Own' about him. If you listen to the words, 'You sheltered me from harm, kept me warm, you gave my life to me, set me free', it says it all."

As for the title, Gates said that he once sent his mother an orchid for her birthday at a time when he could barely afford it: "She was so touched – my dad wrote to tell me I could have had "anything she owned" in return." Gates typically wrote the lyrics after the music. Although the lyrics were written so it could be interpreted as a love song, Gates said: "When I played it for my wife, she knew right away that it was about my father. She cried."

== Reception ==
Record World said that "More melodically subtle than its predecessor, 'Baby I'm-A Want You,' David Gates' latest gem will join the growing line of Bread winners. Cash Box said: "[this] ballad with strongly rhythmic chorus is another David Gates beauty carefully baked by Bread."

== Charts ==
=== Weekly charts ===
Chart (1972)	Peak position
Australia (Kent Music Report)	12
Canada Top Singles (RPM)	5
New Zealand (Listener)	9
UK Singles (Official Charts)	32
US Billboard Hot 100	5
US Adult Contemporary (Billboard)	3
US Cash Box Top 100	6

=== Year-end charts ===
Chart (1972)	Rank
Australia	63
US Billboard Hot 100	52
US Cash Box	68

== Certifications ==
Region	Certification	Certified units/sales
United Kingdom (BPI)	Silver	200,000^{‡}
^{‡} Sales+streaming figures based on certification alone.

== Ken Boothe version ==
"Everything I Own"
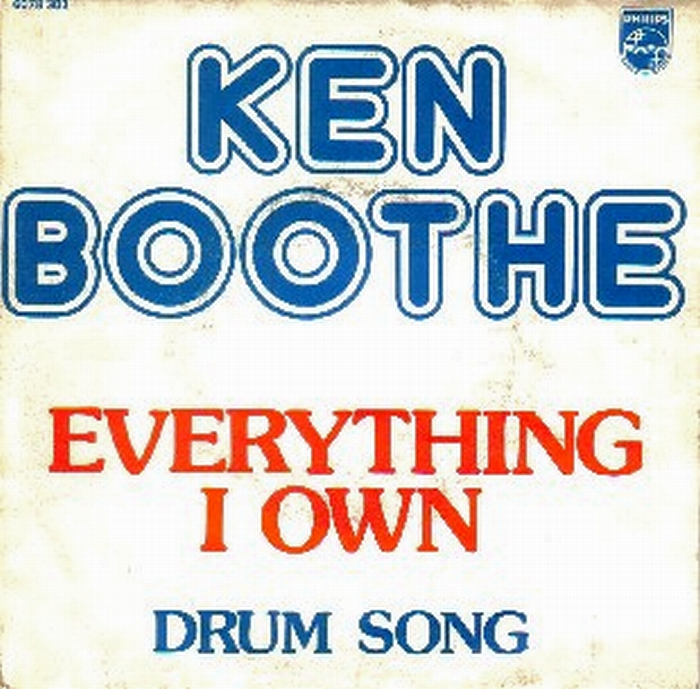

Single by Ken Boothe

from the album Everything I Own
- B-side: "Drum Song"
- Released: 1974
- Studio: Federal studios, Kingston
- Genre: Reggae
- Length: 3:49
- Label: Wild Flower/Federal (Jamaica); Trojan (UK)
- Songwriter: David Gates
- Producer: Lloyd Charmers

Ken Boothe singles chronology
"Everything I Own" (1974)	"Crying Over You" (1974)

Official audio
- "Everything I Own" on YouTube

Jamaican artist Ken Boothe's reggae version of the song "Everything I Own" in 1974 was featured on his Trojan Records album release of the same name. Boothe first heard Andy Williams' version of the song in Canada, and included it on his album as he needed additional material.

He recorded the song at the Federal studios in Kingston, Jamaica, and it reached No. 1 in Jamaica on release. The recording was then picked by Trojan Records for release in the United Kingdom, where it reached No. 1 in the UK Singles Chart on October 26, 1974, staying at the top for three weeks.

The song spent three weeks at No. 1 on the Irish Singles Chart. Although the song was a major success, Trojan went bankrupt in 1975 and Boothe did not receive royalties.

Boothe's version employs the lyric "I would give anything I own".

=== Personnel ===
- Ken Boothe – vocals
- Willie Lindo – guitar
- Lloyd Parks – bass
- Paul Douglas a.k.a. Paul Williams – drums
- Federal Soul Givers
- Lloyd Charmers – producer, organ, piano, percussion
- Buddy Davidson & George Raymond – mixing engineers

== Boy George version ==
"Everything I Own"

Single by Boy George

from the album Sold
- B-side: "Use Me"
- Released: February 23, 1987
- Recorded: 1986 in Montserrat
- Genre: Reggae
- Length: 4:00
- Label: Virgin
- Songwriter: David Gates
- Producer: Stewart Levine

Boy George singles chronology
"Everything I Own" (1987)	"Keep Me in Mind" (1987)
"The Crying Game" (1992)	"Everything I Own" (1993)	"More Than Likely" (1993)

Alternative cover

Music video
- "Everything I Own" on YouTube

The version by British singer and songwriter Boy George reached No. 1 on the UK Singles Chart for two weeks in March 1987, becoming his first hit and only UK No. 1 as a solo artist. It was also his first solo single after a departure from his band, Culture Club. Owing more to the Ken Boothe version, the sweet reggae style was reminiscent of his earlier debut hit with Culture Club, "Do You Really Want to Hurt Me?".

Coming at the time of his arrest for possession of heroin, it provided a major boost to his career. Other than the UK, it was a No. 1 in many countries (including Canada, Ireland, Italy, Norway and South Africa) and top 10 in many markets too. The track was recorded during the "Sold" sessions at Air Studios Montserrat and produced by Stewart Levine.

=== Critical reception ===
William Ruhlmann from AllMusic stated in his review of Sold, "But it's still that bouncy, vulnerable voice, notably on the reggae-tinged hit "Everything I Own", that remains his trademark." On the 1993 version, Larry Flick from Billboard commented, "Refurbished for George's new "At Worst, The Best Of" compilation, oh-so charming track should meet with greater approval this time around—thanks to George's revived strength at radio and radio's increasing penchant for reggaevibed covers."

Irish newspaper The Kerryman wrote that the singer "returns with the deceptive tune that was aired by American group Bread. While it may not be a brilliant return the Boy needs our support. Lets hope this will mark the beginning of a full rehabilitation." A reviewer from People Magazine described it as an "atrocious" reggae version, and added, "To fit the reggae meter George must resort to a sort of hiccup on the chorus, "I would give everything I o-own." Oh-oh, Boy!"

British newspaper Reading Evening Post reviewed the song as a "croaky and tired sounding version of the old hit." Pete Clark of Smash Hits noted that for this cover version, George "opts for the reggae approach", and deemed "this might just mark the beginning of a full rehabilitation".

=== Charts ===
==== Weekly charts ====
Weekly chart performance for "Everything I Own"
Chart (1987)	Peak position
Australia (KMR)	5
Austria (Ö3 Austria Top 40)	10
Belgium (Ultratop 50 Flanders)	2
Canada Top Singles (RPM)	13
Denmark (IFPI)	8
Europe (European Hot 100 Singles)	1
Finland (Suomen virallinen lista)	21
France (SNEP)	11
Ireland (IRMA)	1
Italy Airplay (Music & Media)	3
Netherlands (Dutch Top 40)	3
Netherlands (Single Top 100)	4
New Zealand (Recorded Music NZ)	3
Norway (VG-lista)	1
Sweden (Sverigetopplistan)	14
Switzerland (Schweizer Hitparade)	8
UK Singles (Official Charts)	1
West Germany (GfK)	8
Zimbabwe (ZIMA)	1

==== Year-end charts ====
1987 year-end chart performance for "Everything I Own"
Chart (1987)	Rank
Australia (Kent Music Report)	84
Belgium (Ultratop)	20
Canada Top Singles (RPM)	86
Europe (European Hot 100)	18
Netherlands (Dutch Top 40)	22
Netherlands (Single Top 100)	17
New Zealand (RIANZ)	27
UK Singles (OCC)	21
West Germany (Media Control)	72

== Other versions ==
- Joe Stampley released this song twice, first on his 1972 album If You Touch Me (You've Got to Love Me), and then again in 1976 on his All These Things album. He also released it as a single in 1976. It peaked at No. 12 on the Country charts.
- British-Australian singer Olivia Newton-John recorded a version for her 1972 album Olivia.
- Country star Crystal Gayle released her version as a single in 1983, from her album True Love, where it peaked at No. 93 on the UK Singles Chart.
- The song was covered in 1997 by American boy band NSYNC on their eponymous debut studio album.
- Greg London's version of "Everything I Own" won the award for Best Adult Contemporary Song at the 2009 Hollywood Music in Media Awards.
- A version of "Everything I Own" appeared in the 2009 film Bandslam, performed by Vanessa Hudgens and other cast members (as the fictional band "I Can't Go On, I'll Go On"); they song is also on the movie soundtrack. It is more up-tempo and utilizes two reggae-inspired themes. The first is an introduction that references Jimmy Cliff's The Harder They Come. The second is a ska influence on the choruses.
