= Sweet Surrender (David Gates song) =

Single by Bread

from the album Guitar Man
- B-side: "Make It By Yourself"
- Released: November 1972
- Genre: Rock, soft rock
- Length: 2:38
- Label: Elektra
- Songwriter: David Gates
- Producer: David Gates

Bread singles chronology
| "The Guitar Man" (1972) | "Sweet Surrender" (1972) | "Aubrey" (1973) |

"Sweet Surrender" is a song written by David Gates and performed by Bread. The single was the second release from their fifth album, Guitar Man, and was the last of four No.1 hits for Bread on the US Easy Listening chart. "Sweet Surrender" spent two weeks at No.1 on the chart, while on the Billboard Hot 100, it peaked at No.15.

"Sweet Surrender" also did well internationally. It was a Top 10 hit in Canada (No.4) and New Zealand (No.7).

Record World called it a "David Gates beauty that is sure to please Bread lovers immensely."

== Chart performance ==
=== Weekly charts ===
| Chart (1972–73) | Peak position |
|---|---|
| Australia KMR | 67 |
| Canada RPM Top Singles | 4 |
| Canada RPM Adult Contemporary | 24 |
| New Zealand (Listener) | 7 |
| U.S. Billboard Hot 100 | 15 |
| U.S. Billboard Adult Contemporary | 1 |
| U.S. Cash Box Top 100 | 11 |

=== Year-end charts ===
| Chart (1972) | Rank |
|---|---|
| Canada | 88 |
| U.S. (Joel Whitburn's Pop Annual) | 133 |

| Chart (1973) | Rank |
|---|---|
| Canada | 122 |

== See also ==
- List of number-one adult contemporary singles of 1972 (U.S.)
