= Larry Knechtel =

American keyboards and bassist session musician (1940–2009)

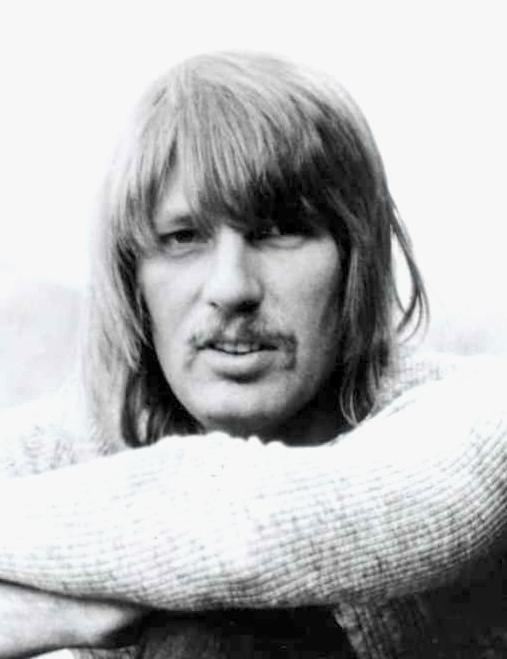
- Knechtel in 1972

Background information
- Born: Lawrence William Knechtel; August 4, 1940; Bell, California, U.S.
- Died: August 20, 2009 (aged 69) Yakima, Washington, U.S.
- Occupation: Session musician
- Instruments: Keyboards; bass; guitar; harmonica
- Formerly of: The Wrecking Crew; Bread
- Website: larryknechtel.com

Lawrence William Knechtel (August 4, 1940 – August 20, 2009) was an American keyboard player and bassist who was a member of the Wrecking Crew, a collection of Los Angeles–based session musicians who worked with such renowned artists as Simon & Garfunkel, Duane Eddy, the Beach Boys, the Mamas & the Papas, the Monkees, the Partridge Family, Billy Joel, the Doors, the Byrds, the Grass Roots, Jerry Garcia, and Elvis Presley. He also was a member of the 1970s band Bread.

== Biography ==
Knechtel was born on August 4, 1940 in Bell, California, a suburb of Los Angeles. His musical education began with piano lessons as a child. In 1957, he joined the Los Angeles–based rock and roll band Kip Tyler and the Flips. In August 1959, he joined instrumentalist Duane Eddy as a member of his band the Rebels. After four years on the road with the band, and continuing to work with Eddy in the recording studio, Knechtel became part of the Los Angeles session musician scene, working with Phil Spector as a pianist to help create Spector's famous "Wall of Sound". Knechtel became a prominent member of session musicians the Wrecking Crew, performing on many hit songs of the period and earning him entry into the Musicians Hall of Fame and Museum in 2007. During his time with the Wrecking Crew, he recorded the album The In Harmonica, playing harmonica under the name "Larry Nelson", with backing by other Wrecking Crew members.

In 1970, Knechtel won a Grammy Award for his piano work on "Bridge over Troubled Water" by Simon and Garfunkel. He also played the piano on Johnny Rivers' 1972 hit "Rockin' Pneumonia and the Boogie Woogie Flu".

Knechtel joined soft rock band Bread in 1971 after the departure of Robb Royer and remained with the band until their split in 1973. He rejoined the band for subsequent comebacks and reunions.

Knechtel was proficient on other musical instruments, notably the harmonica, guitar, and bass, which can be heard on "Mr. Tambourine Man" by the Byrds, "Stoney End" by Barbra Streisand, "If I Can Dream" by Elvis Presley, and the Doors' debut album. In 1971, he joined the band Bread, where his contributions included bass, keyboards, and the guitar solo on the hit single "The Guitar Man". He also played on sessions for Nancy Sinatra.

During the late 1980s, Knechtel moved to Nashville, where he was signed to a solo recording contract. He released two solo albums in quick succession, Mountain Moods (1989) and Urban Gypsy (1990).

In later years, Knechtel lived in semi-retirement in Yakima, Washington, until his death. He had, however, worked with record producer Rick Rubin, contributing keyboards to albums by Neil Diamond, Arlen Roth and the Dixie Chicks, touring with Elvis Costello and with the Dixie Chicks in support of their Grammy Award-winning album Taking the Long Way. During this time, Knechtel contributed guest spots on many recordings for dozens of Northwest artists including Wayman Chapman, Ken Stringfellow (The Posies, R.E.M., Big Star), Quakers On Probation, Dimestore Mystery, Elba, Animals at Night, Zera Marvel, Colin Spring, Lesley Rostron & Lovejunkie, and his son, Lonnie Knechtel.

Knechtel died on August 20, 2009, in Yakima Valley Memorial Hospital, Washington, at the age of 69 of an apparent heart attack.

== Awards and recognition ==
In 2007, Knechtel, along with the other members of the Wrecking Crew, was inducted into the Musicians Hall of Fame and Museum in Nashville, Tennessee.

== Discography ==
=== Solo discography ===
- The In Harmonica (1965, as Larry Nelson)
- Mountain Moods (1989)
- Urban Gypsy (1990)

=== Session work ===
With The Everly Brothers

• Beat & Soul ( Warner Brothers ,1965)

With the Byrds

- Mr. Tambourine Man (Columbia, 1965)
- "Glory, Glory" on the album Byrdmaniax (1971)

With the We Three Trio

- The We Three Trio (Mainstream S/6055,56055, 1965)

With Barbra Streisand

- Stoney End (Columbia Records, 1971)
- Barbra Joan Streisand (Columbia Records, 1971)

With the Beach Boys

- Pet Sounds (Capitol, 1966)

With The Doors

- the Doors (Elektra, 1967)

With Elvis Presley

- Elvis Presley (RCA, 1968)

With Cher

- Stars (Warner Bros. Records, 1975)

With the Dameans

- Walk To That Gloryland' (RCA, 1971)

With Simon & Garfunkel

- Sounds of Silence (Columbia Records, 1966)
- Bookends (Columbia, 1968)
- Bridge over Troubled Water (Columbia, 1970)

With Solomon Burke

- Electronic Magnetism (MGM Records, 1971)

With the Mamas & the Papas

- Deliver (Dunhill, Feb. 1967)
- The Papas & the Mamas (Dunhill, 1968)

With Emitt Rhodes

- The American Dreams (A&M Records, 1970)

With Elvis Costello

- Mighty Like a Rose (Warner Bros. Records, 1991)
- Kojak Variety (Warner Bros. Records, 1995)

With Paul Simon

- Paul Simon (Columbia Records, 1972)

With Chet Baker

- Blood, Chet and Tears (Verve, 1970)

With Dave Mason

- Alone Together (Blue Thumb/Harvest, 1970)

With Nancy Sinatra

- Sugar (Reprise Records, 1966)

With Albert Hammond

- Albert Hammond (Mums Records, 1974)

With Howard Roberts

- Antelope Freeway (Impulse!, 1971)

With Cass Elliott

- Dream a Little Dream (Dunhill Records, 1968)
- Bubblegum, Lemonade, and... Something for Mama (Dunhill Records, 1969)

With Evie Sands

- Any Way That You Want Me (Rev-Ola, 1970)

With Thelma Houston

- Sunshower (Dunhill Records, 1969)
- I've Got the Music in Me (Sheffield Lab Records, 1975)

With Glen Campbell

- Reunion: The Songs of Jimmy Webb (Capitol Records, 1974)
- Unconditional Love (Liberty Records, 1991)

With Jerry Garcia

- Reflections (Round Records, 1976)

With Peter Allen

- I Could Have Been a Sailor (A&M Records, 1979)

With Harry Nilsson

- Harry (RCA Victor, 1969)

With Dan Hill

- If Dreams Had Wings (Epic Records, 1980)

With Barry Mann

- Survivor (RCA Victor, 1975)

With Lalo Schifrin

- Rock Requiem (Verve, 1971)

With Roy Orbison

- King of Hearts (Virgin Records, 1992)

With Jimmy Webb

- El Mirage (Atlantic Records, 1977)

With José Feliciano

- 10 to 23 (RCA Victor, 1969)
- Compartments (RCA Victor, 1973)

With Jackie DeShannon

- New Arrangement (Columbia Records, 1975)

With Brian Cadd

- Yesterdaydreams (Capitol Records, 1978)

With Ron Davies

- Silent Song Through the Land (A&M Records, 1970)

With Bobby Darin

- If I Were a Carpenter (Atlantic Records, 1966)

With Art Garfunkel

- Angel Clare (Columbia Records, 1973)
- Fate for Breakfast (Columbia Records, 1979)
- Scissors Cut (Columbia Records, 1981)

With Stephen Bishop

- Careless (ABC Records, 1976)

With David Clayton-Thomas

- David Clayton-Thomas (Columbia Records, 1972)

With Jackie Lomax

- Is This What You Want? (Apple Records, 1969)

With Billy Joel

- Cold Spring Harbor (Columbia Records, 1971)
- Streetlife Serenade (Columbia Records, 1974)

With Barry McGuire

- Seeds (Myrrh, 1973)
- Lighten Up (Myrrh, 1974)

With Paul Young

- The Crossing (Columbia Records, 1993)

With Dolly Parton

- 9 to 5 and Odd Jobs (RCA Records, 1980)

With Al Kooper

- Easy Does It (Columbia Records, 1970)

With Johnny Rivers

- Changes (Imperial Records, 1966)
- Whisky Á Go-Go Revisited (Sunset Records, 1967)
- Rewind (Imperial Records, 1967)
- Realization (Imperial Records, 1968)
- Slim Slo Slider (Imperial Records, 1970)
- Home Grown (United Artists Records, 1970)
- L.A. Reggae (United Artists Records, 1972)
- Blue Suede Shoes (United Artists Records, 1973)
- New Lovers and Old Friends (Epic Records, 1975)
- Wild Night (United Artists Records, 1977)
- Not a Through Street (CBS, 1983)

With John Denver

- The Flower That Shattered the Stone (Windstar Records, 1990)

With Chet Atkins

- Read My Licks (Columbia, 1994)

With Helen Reddy

- Helen Reddy (Capitol Records, 1971)

With Joan Baez

- Diamonds & Rust (A&M Records, 1975)
- Gulf Winds (A&M Records, 1976)
- Blowin' Away (Portrait Records, 1977)

With Arlen Roth

- Toolin' Around (Blue Plate, 1993, Aquinnah, 2015)

With Neil Diamond

- Tap Root Manuscript (Uni Records, 1970)
- Beautiful Noise (Columbia Records, 1976)
- Lovescape (Columbia Records, 1991)
- 12 Songs (Columbia Records, 2005)
