= If (Bread song) =

1971 single by Bread

Single by Bread

from the album Manna
- B-side: "Take Comfort"
- Released: March 21, 1971
- Genre: Soft rock
- Length: 2:33
- Label: Elektra
- Songwriter: David Gates
- Producer: David Gates

Bread singles chronology
"Let Your Love Go" (1971)	"If" (1971)	"Mother Freedom" (1971)

"If" is a song written by American singer-songwriter David Gates in 1971. Originally popularized by his group Bread, "If" charted at No. 4 on the U.S. Billboard Hot 100 when released as a single in 1971 and No. 6 in Canada. It also spent three weeks at No. 1 on the U.S. Easy Listening chart, and one week at the top of the Canadian AC chart.

Record World said that the "gentle song by group's own David Gates (he produced and arranged also) will score in short order."

In the U.S., Bread's tune was the shortest song title to become a top ten hit until 1993, when Prince hit No. 7 with "7", later matched by Britney Spears' No. 1 hit "3" in 2009.

== Chart performance ==
=== Weekly charts ===
Chart (1971)	Peak position
Australia (Kent Music Report)	41
Canada RPM Top Singles	6
Canada RPM Adult Contemporary	1
U.S. Billboard Hot 100	4
U.S. Billboard Adult Contemporary	1
U.S. Cash Box Top 100	6

=== Year-end charts ===
Chart (1971)	Rank
Canada RPM Top Singles	82
U.S. Billboard Hot 100	61
U.S. Cash Box	89

== Telly Savalas version ==
"If"

Single by Telly Savalas

from the album Telly
- B-side: "Rubber Bands and Bits of String" (US) "You and Me Against the World" (UK)
- Released: 1974
- Genre: Pop, spoken word
- Length: 3:06
- Label: MCA
- Songwriter: David Gates
- Producer: Snuff Garrett

Telly Savalas singles chronology
"We All End Up the Same" (1972)	"If" (1974)	"You've Lost That Lovin' Feelin'" / "Help Me Make It Through the Night" (1974)

Telly Savalas recorded a mostly-spoken interpretation which reached No. 1 on the UK Singles Chart for two weeks and No. 1 in Ireland in March 1975. It has the shortest title of any song to reach No. 1 in the UK. This version also charted at No. 12 on the US Billboard Easy Listening chart in late 1974. In Canada, "If" reached No. 88 on the Pop chart, and No. 40 on the AC chart. It also peaked at number 12 in Australia and was the 81st biggest selling single in Australia in 1975.

== Other versions ==
- Olivia Newton-John was one of the first to cover the song, recording a version for her 1971 debut solo album, If Not for You, and performing the song during her first American television performance that year on The Dean Martin Show.
- The Supremes and the Four Tops covered the song on their 1971 collaborative album, Dynamite.
- A parody take on Savalas' rendition, by voice over artists Chris Sandford and Bill Mitchell performing as Yin and Yan, reached No. 25 in the UK in 1975.
- Cleo Laine performed the song on The Muppet Show with puppeteer Bruce Schwartz in 1978.
- Sissel Kyrkjebø covered the song in her 1993 album, Gift of Love.
- Dolly Parton covered the song on her 2002 album, Halos & Horns.
- Sephira covered the song on their 2015 album, Believe.
