= Bread (band) =

American soft rock band

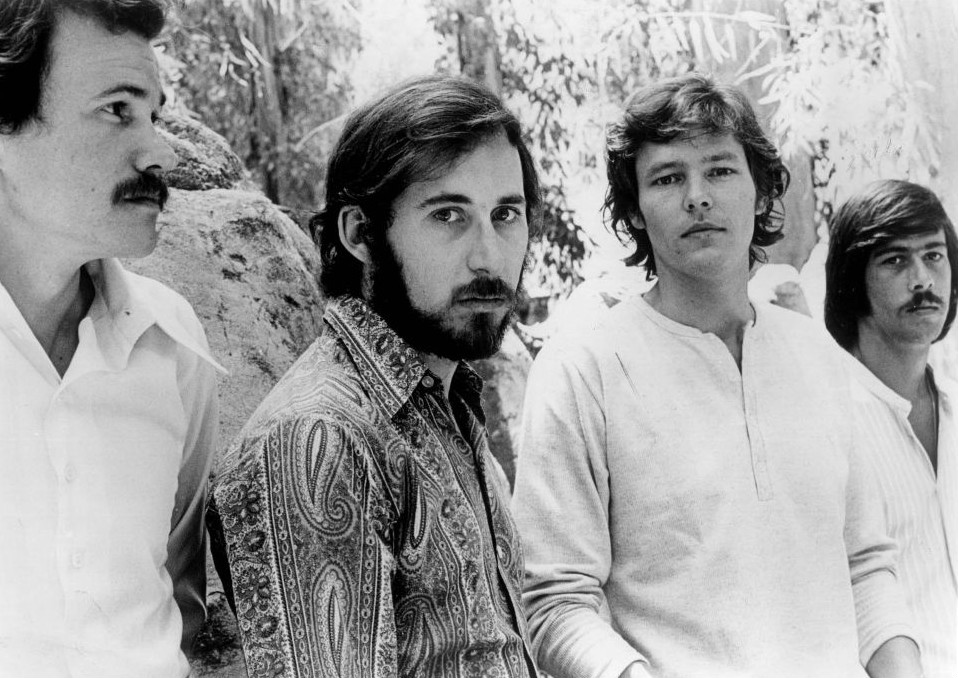
- Bread in 1971 (L–R: David Gates, Robb Royer, Jimmy Griffin, Mike Botts)

Background information
- Also known as: David Gates & Bread (1978)
- Origin: Los Angeles, California, U.S.
- Genre: Soft rock
- Years active: 1968–1973; 1976–1978; 1996–1997
- Label: Elektra
- Spinoffs: Black Tie; The Remingtons
- Past members: David Gates; Jimmy Griffin; Robb Royer; Mike Botts; Larry Knechtel

Bread was an American soft rock band from Los Angeles, California. They had 13 songs chart on the Billboard Hot 100 between 1970 and 1977.

The band was fronted by David Gates (vocals, bass guitar, guitar, keyboards, violin, viola, percussion) with Jimmy Griffin (vocals, guitar, keyboards, percussion) and Robb Royer (bass guitar, guitar, flute, keyboards, percussion, recorder, backing vocals). On their first album session musicians Ron Edgar played drums and Jim Gordon played drums, percussion, and piano. Mike Botts became their permanent drummer when he joined in the summer of 1969, and Larry Knechtel replaced Royer in 1971, playing keyboards, bass guitar, guitar, and harmonica.

== History ==
=== Beginnings and fame ===
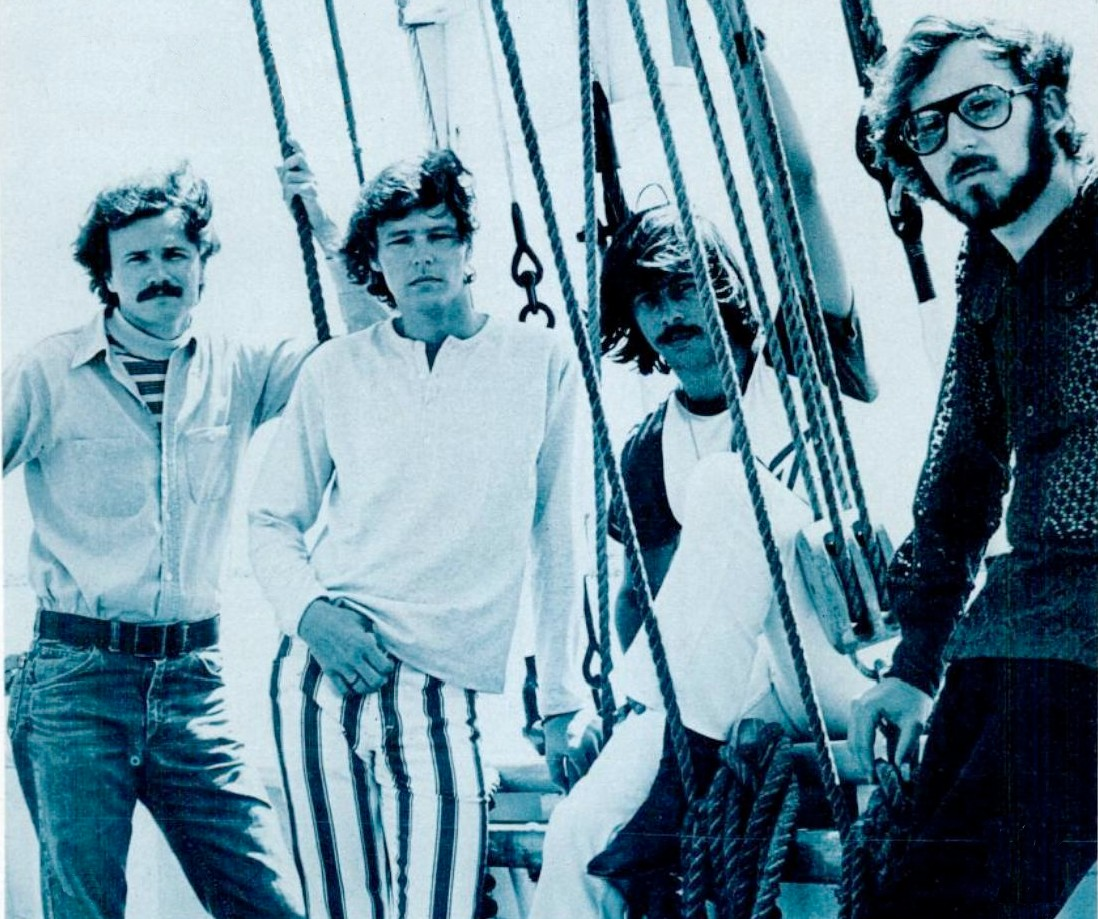
The band in 1970

David Gates is from Tulsa, Oklahoma. He released a song in the late 1950s titled "Jo-Baby"/"Lovin' at Night". Gates knew Leon Russell and both played in bar bands around the Tulsa area. Both Gates and Russell headed for California to check out the music scene there. Before forming Bread, Gates had worked with Royer's previous band, the Pleasure Fair, who recorded one album for the UNI Records label with Gates producing and arranging. Royer then introduced Gates to his songwriting partner, Griffin, and the trio joined in 1968 and signed with Elektra Records in January 1969. Gates later explained the genesis of the band's name:

A bread truck came along right at the time we were trying to think of a name. We had been saying, "How about bush, telephone pole? Ah, bread truck, bread." It began with a B, like the Beatles and the Bee Gees. Bread also had a kind of universal appeal. It could be taken a number of ways. Of course, for the entire first year people called us the Breads.

The group's first single, "Dismal Day", was released in June 1969 but did not chart. Their debut album, Bread, was released in September 1969 and peaked at No. 127 on the Billboard 200. The songwriting on the album was split evenly between Gates and the team of Griffin-Royer. Session musicians Jim Gordon and Ron Edgar accompanied the band on drums for the album.

On July 25, 1969, Bread appeared in concert for the first time, with Gordon on drums, at the Aquarius Theater in Hollywood, opening for the Flying Burrito Brothers. When Gordon's schedule conflicted and he proved unavailable for future outings, they brought in Mike Botts as their permanent drummer. Botts, whom Gates had previously worked with in Botts's group the Travelers 3 as a producer, appeared on their second album, On the Waters (released in July 1970 and peaking at No. 12 on the Billboard 200). This time their efforts quickly established Bread as a major act with the Billboard Hot 100 No. 1 hit "Make It with You" in 1970. "Make It with You" would be Bread's only No. 1 on the Hot 100.

For their next single, Bread released a re-recorded version of "It Don't Matter To Me", a Gates song from their first album. This single was a hit as well, reaching No. 10. Bread began touring and recording their third album, titled Manna (March 1971), which peaked at No. 21 and included "Let Your Love Go" (which preceded the album's release and made No. 28) and the Top 5 hit single, "If". As with the first album, songwriting credits were split evenly between Gates and Griffin-Royer.

Royer, after conflicts with other members of the band, left the group in the summer of 1971 after three albums, although he would continue to write with Griffin. He was replaced by Larry Knechtel, a leading Los Angeles session musician who had played piano and harpsichord on The Beach Boys Pet Sounds album and on Simon & Garfunkel's "Bridge Over Troubled Water" single in 1970.

The band in 1972. Left to right: David Gates, Jimmy Griffin, Larry Knechtel, Mike Botts.

In January 1972 Bread released Baby I'm-a Want You, their most successful album, which peaked at No. 3 on the Billboard 200. The title song was established as a hit in late 1971 before the album was released, also hitting No. 3. Follow-up singles "Everything I Own" and "Diary" also went Top 20.

The next album, Guitar Man, was released ten months later and went to No. 18. The album produced three Top 20 singles, "The Guitar Man" (No. 11), "Sweet Surrender" (No. 15), and "Aubrey" (No. 15), with the first two going to No. 1 on Billboard's adult contemporary chart.

=== Split and reunion ===
By 1973, fatigue from constant recording and touring had set in despite the band's success, and personal relationships began to show strain, especially between Gates and Griffin. All eleven of Bread's charting singles between 1970 and 1973 had been written and sung by Gates. Elektra Records had invariably selected Gates' songs for the A-sides of the singles, while Griffin felt that the singles should have been split between the two of them. There was also some dissatisfaction with the songs planned for a sixth album. After their equipment and instruments were destroyed in a truck accident prior to a scheduled concert at the Salt Palace in Salt Lake City in June 1973, Bread decided to disband.

Gates and Griffin returned to their solo careers with mixed results. The Best of Bread compilation album from March 1973 was a huge success, peaking at No. 2 on the Billboard 200 and staying on the chart for over two years. The follow-up, The Best of Bread, Volume 2, was released in May 1974 and went to No. 32.

The reunion of the group in 1976 came about after Elektra Records expressed interest in another Bread album. Gates, Griffin, Botts and Knechtel returned to the studio that year and recorded Lost Without Your Love, released in January 1977. The title track, again written and sung by Gates, was the band's last Top 10 hit, peaking at No. 9 on the singles chart. This comeback record reached No. 26 on the Billboard 200 and was Bread's seventh consecutive album (including the two best ofs) to be RIAA-certified gold. In March 1977, Elektra released a second single, "Hooked On You". It was less successful on the pop chart (peaking at No. 60) but it reached No. 2 on the Billboard Adult Contemporary chart.

The four members of Bread (along with session guitarist Dean Parks) toured throughout the spring of 1977 to support their comeback album. After a short break, they commenced the tour's third leg that summer without Griffin, whom Gates failed to invite after further rising tensions and Griffin's worsening problems with substance abuse. They ended the year with no further plans to record as a group.

=== Following the break-up ===
In 1978, Gates enjoyed success as a solo artist with the hit singles "Goodbye Girl" (No. 15; from the movie The Goodbye Girl) and "Took the Last Train" (No. 30). He then continued to tour with Botts and Knechtel as "David Gates & Bread", making TV appearances, including a guest shot on The Hardy Boys Mysteries which aired in November 1978. The group's 1978 touring line-up once again included Dean Parks for their June tour of the UK and Europe. By their fall dates back in the US, Parks had left and the stage lineup had expanded to include Warren Ham (ex-Bloodrock; woodwinds, keyboards, backing vocals), Bill Ham (guitars) and David Miner (bass). This led to a legal dispute with Griffin over the use of the band's name, of which Griffin was co-owner. In the dispute, Griffin again complained that Gates' songs were given preference as singles over his. The resulting litigation, which resulted in the Bread name being retired altogether by late 1978, was not settled until 1984.

After leaving Bread in 1971, Royer stuck mostly to songwriting (still teaming up with Griffin on occasion). As with Griffin, he eventually kicked his drug problems and his success was mostly in writing for artists in the country music field in the 1980s and 1990s. In 1994, Royer, Griffin and Knechtel re-united under the name "Toast". Knechtel had continued to be an in-demand session player, backing up artists including Elvis Costello. In September 1994, after being out of the spotlight for thirteen years, Gates released a new solo album, Love Is Always Seventeen.

In 1990, Griffin founded the country music supergroup Black Tie with Billy Swan and former Eagles member Randy Meisner. After this entity broke up, he recorded two albums as a member of another country music group, The Remingtons.

=== Final reunion ===
In 1996, having settled their differences, the original members Gates, Griffin, Botts and Knechtel reunited Bread for a final and successful "25th Anniversary" tour of the United States, South Africa, New Zealand, Australia, the UK, Ireland, and Asia. This time out, the group was accompanied by Randy Flowers (guitars), Scott Chambers (bass) and a string section to help them capture the sound of the records. This tour was extended into 1997, which would be the last year the members of Bread would ever perform together. Gates and the others then resumed their individual careers. Bread was inducted into the Vocal Group Hall of Fame in 2006.

=== Life after Bread ===
In 2005, both Griffin and Botts died from cancer at the age of 61. In August 2009, Knechtel died of a heart attack at the age of 69, leaving Gates and Royer as the only surviving members of Bread. Royer continues to be involved in music, initially working out of his Nashfilms studio in Tennessee before relocating to the Virgin Islands in 2013. Gates contents himself with retirement at his home in Washington with his wife Jo Rita. In 2010, Royer released a Jimmy Griffin tribute album consisting of songs written by both himself and Griffin.

During March 2014, the first biography of the band appeared, written by UK author Malcolm C. Searles, titled Bread: A Sweet Surrender (originally called Manna from Heaven: The Musical Rise & Fall of Bread). It was written with the assistance of many surviving family members and musical colleagues of the band, along with exclusive interviews with founding member Robb Royer. A paperback/soft-cover edition appeared during 2017. The following year Royer published his own memoirs, The View from Contessa.

== Personnel ==
- David Gates – vocals, guitar, bass guitar, keyboards, violin, viola, percussion (1968–1973, 1976–1978, 1996–1997)
- Jimmy Griffin – vocals, guitar, keyboards, percussion (1968–1973, 1976–1977, 1996–1997; died 2005)
- Robb Royer – guitar, bass guitar, flute, keyboards, percussion, recorder, backing vocals (1968–1971)
- Mike Botts – drums, percussion (1969–1973, 1976–1978, 1996–1997; died 2005)
- Larry Knechtel – keyboards, bass guitar, guitar, harmonica (1971–1973, 1976–1978, 1996–1997; died 2009)

== Discography ==
=== Studio albums ===
Title	Details	Peak chart positions							Certifications
Title	Details	US	AUS	CAN	NLD	NZ	NOR	UK	Certifications
Bread	Released: August 1969; Label: Elektra; Formats: Vinyl · cassette · 8-track · 4-track	127	—	—	—	—	—	—	ARIA: 2× Platinum
On the Waters	Released: July 1970; Label: Elektra; Formats: Vinyl · cassette · 8-track	12	35	12	—	—	—	34	RIAA: Gold
Manna	Released: March 1971; Label: Elektra; Formats: Vinyl · cassette · 8-track	21	35	16	—	—	—	—	RIAA: Gold
Baby I'm-a Want You	Released: January 1972; Label: Elektra; Formats: Vinyl · cassette · 8-track	3	23	8	—	—	—	9	RIAA: Gold
Guitar Man	Released: October 1972; Label: Elektra; Formats: Vinyl · cassette · 8-track	18	22	10	—	—	—	—	RIAA: Gold
Lost Without Your Love	Released: January 1977; Label: Elektra; Formats: Vinyl · cassette · 8-track	26	22	49	8	20	19	17	RIAA: Gold; ARIA: Gold
"—" denotes a title that did not chart, or was not released in that territory.

=== Compilation albums ===
Title	Details	Peak chart positions						Certifications
Title	Details	US	AUS	CAN	NLD	NZ	UK	Certifications
The Best of Bread	Released: 1973; Label: Elektra	2	26	3	—	15	7	RIAA: 5× Platinum; ARIA: Gold; BPI: Silver
The Best of Bread, Volume 2	Released: 1974; Label: Elektra	32	73	32	—	—	48	RIAA: Gold
The Sound of Bread	Released: 1977; Label: Elektra	—	28	—	26	2	1	BPI: Platinum
The Music Of	Released: 1981; Label: Arcade Records	—	—	—	15	—	—	
Anthology of Bread	Released: 1985; Label: Elektra	—	—	—	—	—	—	RIAA: Platinum; BPI: Silver
The Very Best of Bread	Released: 1989; Label: Pickwick Records	—	—	—	—	3	41	BPI: Silver
David Gates & Bread Essentials	Released: 1996; Label: Elektra	—	—	—	—	9	9	ARIA: Gold; BPI: Gold
Retrospective	Released: 1996; Label: Elektra	—	—	—	—	20	—	
Make It with You and Other Hits	Released: 2002; Label: Rhino	—	—	—	—	—	—	
The Definitive Collection	Released: 2006; Label: Elektra/Rhino	—	—	—	—	—	—	
The Works	Released: 2007; Label: Warner Music Group UK/Rhino; Format: Triple CD	—	—	—	—	—	—	
Collected: Bread & David Gates	Released: 2012; Label: Universal; Format: Triple CD	—	—	—	28	—	—	
The Elektra Years: The Complete Album Collection	Released: 2017; Label: Warner Music Group UK/Rhino; Format: 6 CD box set	—	—	—	—	—	—	
"—" denotes a title that did not chart, or was not released in that territory.

=== Singles ===
List of singles, with selected chart positions and certifications, showing year released and album name
Title	Year	Peak chart positions									Certifications	Album
Title	Year	US	US AC	AUS	BEL	CAN	IRE	NLD	NZ	UK	Certifications	Album
"Dismal Day"	1969	—	—	—	—	—	—	—	—	—		Bread
"Could I"	1969	—	—	—	—	—	—	—	—	—		Bread
"Move Over"	1969	—	—	—	—	—	—	—	—	—		Bread
"Make It with You"	1970	1	4	7	—	2	10	—	6	5	RIAA: Gold; BPI: Silver; RMNZ: Platinum	On the Waters
"It Don't Matter to Me"	1970	10	2	29	—	6	—	—	10	—		Bread
"Let Your Love Go"	1971	28	—	34	—	17	—	—	—	—		Manna
"If"	1971	4	1	41	—	6	—	21	—	—	RMNZ: Gold	Manna
"Mother Freedom"	1971	37	—	—	—	52	—	—	—	—		Baby I'm-a Want You
"Baby I'm-a Want You"	1971	3	1	8	—	5	—	—	—	14	RIAA: Gold; RMNZ: Gold	Baby I'm-a Want You
"Everything I Own"	1972	5	3	12	—	5	—	—	9	32	BPI: Silver; RMNZ: Platinum	Baby I'm-a Want You
"Diary"	1972	15	3	26	—	12	—	—	13	—		Baby I'm-a Want You
"The Guitar Man"	1972	11	1	22	48	6	14	8	2	16	RMNZ: Gold	Guitar Man
"Sweet Surrender"	1972	15	1	67	—	4	—	—	7	53 (Note: Chart position is from the official UK "Breakers List")		Guitar Man
"Aubrey"	1973	15	4	—	—	41	—	—	8	—		Guitar Man
"Lost Without Your Love"	1976	9	3	19	23	8	—	11	23	27		Lost Without Your Love
"Hooked on You"	1977	60	2	—	—	48	—	—	—	—		Lost Without Your Love
"—" denotes a title that did not chart, or was not released in that territory.
