= David Gates =

American musician (born 1940)

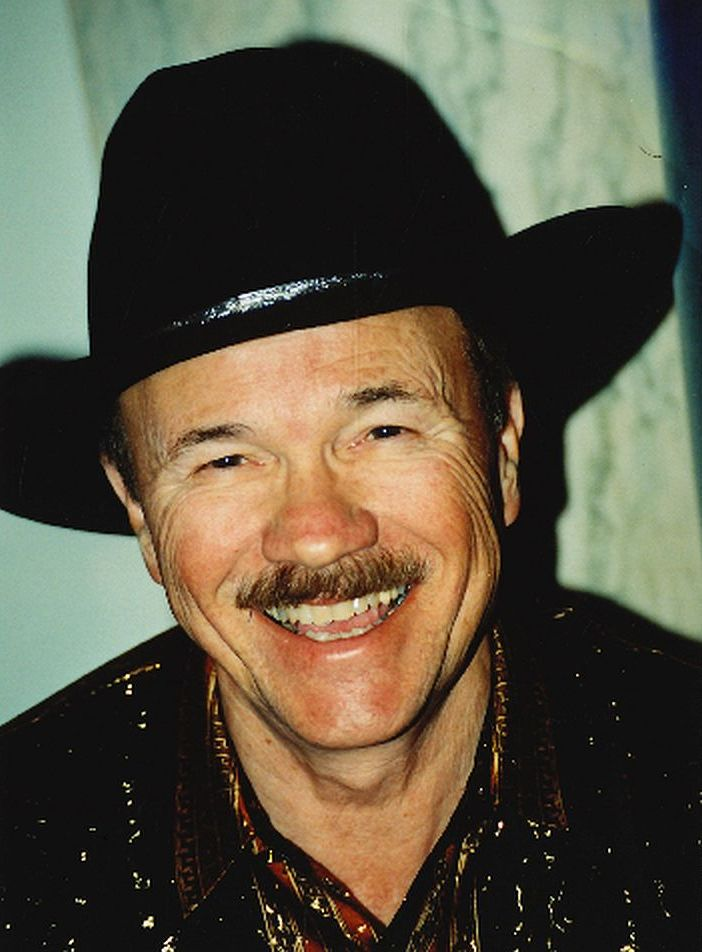
- Gates in 2000

Background information
- Born: David Ashworth Gates; December 11, 1940 (age 85); Tulsa, Oklahoma, U.S.
- Genres: Soft rock; country; pop rock
- Occupations: Musician; songwriter; producer
- Instruments: Vocals; guitar; bass guitar; piano; keyboards; violin; percussion
- Years active: 1957–2007
- Formerly of: Bread

David Ashworth Gates (born December 11, 1940) is a retired American singer-songwriter, musician and producer, who is best known for being the frontman and co-lead singer (with Jimmy Griffin) of the group Bread, which reached the top of the musical charts in Europe and North America on several occasions in the 1970s. The band was inducted into the Vocal Group Hall of Fame.

== Life and early career ==
Originally from Tulsa, Oklahoma, Gates was surrounded by music from infancy, as the son of Clarence Gates, a band director, and Wanda Rollins, a piano teacher. He became proficient in piano, violin, bass and guitar by the time he enrolled in Tulsa's Will Rogers High School. Gates formed his first band, The Accents, with other high school musicians which included a piano player, Claude Russell Bridges, who later in life changed his name to Leon Russell. During a concert in 1957, the Accents backed Chuck Berry. In 1957, David Gates and the Accents released the 45 "Jo-Baby" / "Lovin' at Night" on Robbins record label. The A-side was written for his sweetheart, Jo Rita, whom he married in 1959 while enrolled at the University of Oklahoma studying law and pre-med. At Oklahoma he became a member of Delta Tau Delta International Fraternity.

In 1961, he and his family moved to Los Angeles, where Gates continued writing songs, and he worked as a music copyist, as a studio musician, and as a producer for many artists – including Pat Boone. Success soon followed. His composition "Popsicles and Icicles" hit No. 3 on the US Hot 100 for The Murmaids in January 1964. The Monkees recorded another of his songs, "Saturday's Child". By the end of the 1960s, he had worked with many leading artists, including Elvis Presley, Phil Spector and Brian Wilson. In 1965, Gates arranged the Glenn Yarbrough hit, "Baby the Rain Must Fall". In 1966, he produced two singles on A&M Records for Captain Beefheart and The Magic Band.

Gates scored his first motion picture Journey to Shiloh in 1967.

In the meantime, Gates had been releasing singles of his own on several labels in the early 1960s. On Mala Records, he released "There's a Heaven" / "She Don't Cry", "You'll Be My Baby" / "What's This I Hear", "The Happiest Man Alive" / "A Road That Leads to Love", and "Jo Baby" / "Teardrops in My Heart". On Planetary, he released "Little Miss Stuck Up" / "The Brighter Side", and "Let You Go" / "Once upon a Time" under the pseudonym of "Del Ashley" in 1965. On Del-Fi, he released "No One Really Loves a Clown" / "You Had It Comin' to Ya". He also released a single under the name of "The Manchesters" in 1965 on the Vee-Jay label.

== Bread and fame ==
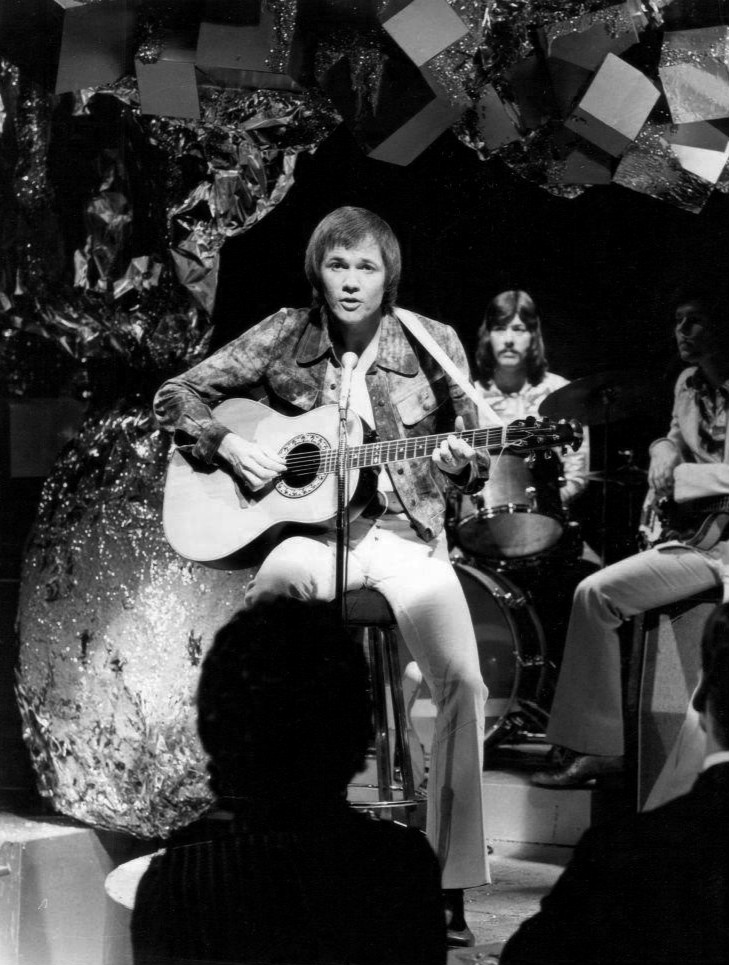
Gates and Bread performing on the television program Hotel Ninety in 1973

In 1967, Gates produced and arranged the debut album for a band called The Pleasure Fair, of which Robb Royer was a member. A little over a year later, Gates and Royer got together with Jimmy Griffin to form Bread. The group was signed by the Elektra record company, where it would remain for the eight years of its existence. Elektra released Bread's first album, Bread, in 1969, which peaked at No. 127 on the Billboard 200. The first single, "Dismal Day", written by Gates, was released in June 1969 but did not sell well.

Bread's second album, On the Waters (the title a wordplay on Ecclesiastes 11:1; "Cast thy bread upon the waters: for thou shalt find it after many days."), with a new drummer, Mike Botts, was released in 1970, and became a breakout success. It contained the No. 1 single "Make It with You" and was the first of seven consecutive Bread albums to go gold in the US. Bread's next three albums, Manna (1971), Baby I'm-a Want You (1972) (featuring Larry Knechtel as a new member of the band, replacing Royer) and Guitar Man (1972) were also successful, with more chart singles and gold records. From 1970 to 1973, Bread charted 11 singles on the Billboard Hot 100, and all were written and sung by Gates. That caused some antagonism between Gates and Griffin, who was also a significant contributor to Bread's albums as a singer and songwriter. Bread disbanded in 1973. Their last concert was performed at the Salt Palace in Salt Lake City, Utah on May 19, 1973.

Gates recorded and produced his solo album First in 1973. The single "Clouds", an edited version of the album track "Suite Clouds and Rain", peaked at No. 47 on the Billboard Hot 100 singles chart, and No. 3 on the Adult Contemporary chart. The full album version was played extensively by Radio Caroline presenter Samantha Dubois at the end of her early morning radio programme, and became her closing theme. A second single, "Sail Around the World", reached No. 50 on the singles chart and No. 11 on the Adult Contemporary chart. The album reached No. 107 on the Billboard 200 albums chart. In 1975, Gates released the album Never Let Her Go. The title track was released as a single, and reached No. 29 on the Hot 100 chart and No. 3 on the Adult Contemporary chart. The album itself reached No. 102 on the Billboard 200.

Bread reunited in 1976 for one album, Lost Without Your Love, released late that year. The title track—again written and sung by Gates—reached No. 9 on the Billboard Hot 100. At the end of 1977, Gates released what would be his most successful single as a solo artist, "Goodbye Girl", from the 1977 film The Goodbye Girl. It peaked at No. 15 on the Billboard Hot 100 in 1978. To capitalize on that success, Gates put an album together in June 1978 that featured material from his first two solo albums mixed with some new material. It yielded another hit single, "Took the Last Train", which reached No. 30 on the Billboard Hot 100 but the album itself made it only to No. 165 on the Billboard 200.

Botts and Knechtel from Bread, along with Warren Ham, brother Bill Ham and bassist David Miner, continued to record and tour with Gates. In late 1978, they toured billing themselves as "David Gates & Bread"—also guest starring on an episode of The Hardy Boys Mysteries—which brought a lawsuit from Griffin, who was still co-owner of the Bread trademark, and an injunction against the use of the name Bread. By the end of 1978, the "Bread" moniker had been dropped and they continued on as "David Gates and His Band". The dispute was not resolved until 1984.

Gates released the albums Falling in Love Again (featuring "Where Does the Loving Go"), which peaked at No. 46 on the Billboard Hot 100 in 1979, and Take Me Now, which peaked at No. 62, in 1981. He recorded a duet with Melissa Manchester, "Wish We Were Heroes", included in her 1982 album Hey Ricky. Gates was less active in music during the remainder of the 1980s. He concentrated on operating a cattle ranch in the Fall River Valley of Northern California, located on land he purchased in the 1970s. He returned to music in 1994, when he released Love Is Always Seventeen, his first new album in thirteen years.

Gates and Griffin put aside their differences, and reunited for a final Bread tour in 1996–97 with Botts and Knechtel. With the deaths of three of the other principal members of Bread, Gates is the sole surviving band member from their heyday, although Royer still successfully works in Nashville.

The David Gates Songbook, containing earlier hit singles and new material, was released in 2002. Engelbert Humperdinck included "Baby I'm-a Want You" on his 1972 album In Time and "If" on his 2003 album Definition of Love. Frank Sinatra covered "If" in a live performance at Madison Square Garden on October 12, 1974, which was recorded by Reprise. Gates's songs have been recorded by many artists, including Telly Savalas, who had a UK No. 1 hit with "If" in 1975; Vesta Williams, who made a rendition of "Make It with You" in 1988; the band CAKE, which covered "The Guitar Man" in 2004; Ray Parker Jr., who also recorded "The Guitar Man" in 2006; and Boy George, who took "Everything I Own" to No. 1 on the UK chart, when he covered the Ken Boothe reggae version of Gates's song, which itself had been a UK No. 1 in 1974. Jack Jones recorded a Bread tribute album, Bread Winners (1972) including the Gates standard, "If", which has long been a staple of Jones's live performances.

== Personal life ==
According to a 1996 article in People, Gates has remained married to high school sweetheart Jo Rita since 1959. Together they raised four children: three lawyers and a cardiothoracic surgeon. Gates, who studied the cattle ranching business while touring with Bread, purchased a Northern California 1,400-acre (570 ha) cattle ranch, financed by royalties he earned during his time with the band. Approaching retirement age, Gates sold the ranch in 2002, and he and his wife moved near San Diego, California.

== Discography ==
=== Studio albums ===
Year	Title	Chart positions		
Year	Title	US	UK	AUS
1973	First	107	–	–
1975	Never Let Her Go	102	32	–
1978	Goodbye Girl	165	28	69
1980	Falling in Love Again	–	–	–
1981	Take Me Now	–	–	–
1994	Love Is Always Seventeen	–	–	–

=== Compilation albums ===
Year	Title	Chart positions		
Year	Title	US	UK	AUS
1985	Anthology	–	–	–
2002	The David Gates Songbook	–	11	34

=== Singles ===
Year	Title	Chart positions				
Year	Title	US	US AC	UK	CAN	CAN AC
1957	"Jo Baby"	–	–	–	–	–
1958	"Pretty Baby"	–	–	–	–	–
1959	"Swingin' Baby Doll"	–	–	–	–	–
1960	"What's This I Hear"	–	–	–	–	–
1960	"The Happiest Man Alive"	–	–	–	–	–
1961	"Teardrops in My Heart"	–	–	–	–	–
1962	"Sad September"	–	–	–	–	–
1963	"No One Really Loves a Clown"	–	–	–	–	–
1964	"The Oakie Surfer"	–	–	–	–	–
1964	"My Baby's Gone Away"	–	–	–	–	–
1964	"She Don't Cry"	–	–	–	–	–
1965	"Little Miss Stuck-Up"	–	–	–	–	–
1965	"Just a Lot of Talk"	–	–	–	–	–
1965	"Sad September"	–	–	–	–	–
1965	"Let You Go"	–	–	–	–	–
1965	"I Don't Come from England"	–	–	–	–	–
1973	"Suite: Clouds, Rain"	47	3	–	55	–
1973	"Sail Around the World" / "Lorilee"	50	11	–	–	–
1975	"Never Let Her Go"	29	3	–	46	–
1975	"Part-Time Love"	–	34	–	–	–
1977	"Goodbye Girl"	15	3	53	8	–
1978	"Took the Last Train"	30	7	50	29	–
1979	"Where Does the Lovin' Go"	46	9	–	–	–
1980	"Can I Call You"	–	–	–	–	–
1980	"Falling in Love Again"	–	–	–	–	
1981	"Take Me Now"	62	15	–	–	9
1981	"Come Home for Christmas"	–	–	–	–	–
1994	"I Can't Find the Words to Say Goodbye"	–	–	–	–	–
