= Ezri Namvar =

Iranian businessperson (born 1951/1952)

- Born: 1951 or 1952 (age 74–75); Imperial State of Iran
- Education: University of California, Los Angeles
- Occupations: Businessman, Financier, philanthropist
- Spouse: Ilana Namvar
- Parent: Eilel Namvar

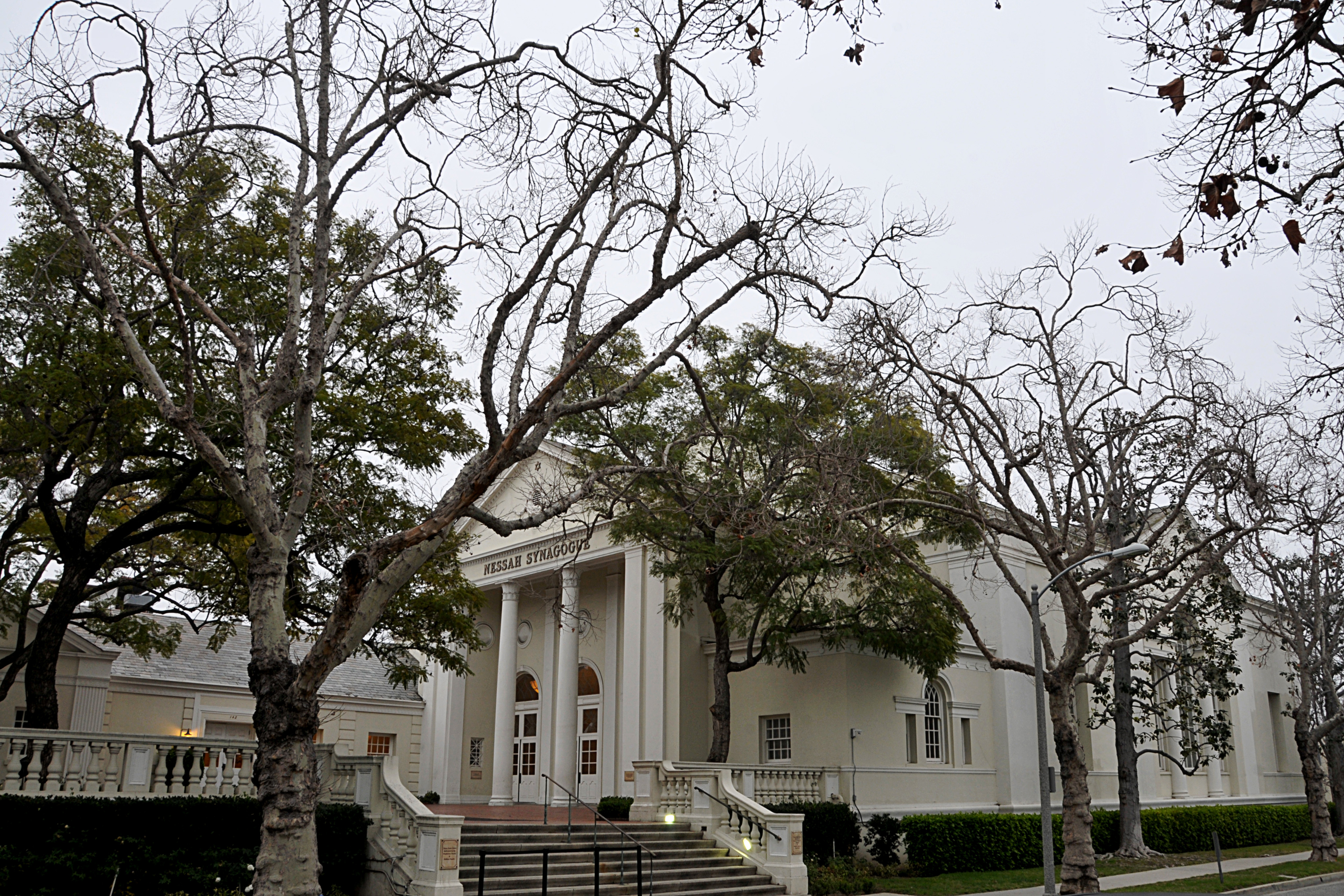
The Nessah Synagogue in Beverly Hills, California.

Ezri Namvar (born 1951 or 1952) is an Iranian-born American businessman and philanthropist. He was the founder and chairman of Namco Capital Group, an asset management firm based in Los Angeles, California.

During the 2008 financial crisis, he was sued by his investors, forced to declare bankruptcy, leading to "$1 billion in claims" from investors.

== Early life ==
Ezri Namvar was born c. 1952 in Iran. His father, Eilel Namvar, was a Jewish real estate speculator and moneylender whose assets were confiscated during the Iranian Revolution. According to the Los Angeles Times Eilel Namvar "had been a deeply respected money lender in Iran". He has four brothers, Sean, Mousa, Tony and Ramin.

Namvar graduated from the University of California, Los Angeles.

== Career ==
Namvar was the founder and chairman of Namco Capital Group, an asset management firm. The company was headquartered on the 14th floor of the Wilshire Bundy Plaza, an office tower on the corner of Wilshire Boulevard and Bundy Drive in Brentwood owned by Namvar. Namco Capital Group was worth $2.43 billion dollars in 2008.

He was also the owner of the Security Pacific Bank, a bank in Downtown Los Angeles. Additionally, he acquired the Marriott Hotel in Downtown Los Angeles, the Hotel Angeleno in Westwood, and the Cal Neva Lodge & Casino near Lake Tahoe. He was the owner of "more than 150 residential and office buildings in California, New York, Nevada, and Arizona." He also invested in "apartment buildings, vacant land in rural areas, an equestrian center and a pistachio farm."

During the 2008 financial crisis, he was sued by his investors and forced to declare bankruptcy by December 2008. A month later, in November 2008, his Security Pacific Bank was rescued by the Federal Deposit Insurance Corporation. His bankruptcy led to "$1 billion in claims" from investors. Most of his customers were Persian Jews, many of whom attended the Nessah Synagogue in Beverly Hills. As a result, he became known as the "Bernie Madoff of Beverly Hills." In October 2011, he received a seven-year prison sentence "for stealing approximately $21 million from four clients."

Iranian-born American actor David Diaan wrote a play about Namvar's downfall entitled Death: A Very Serious Comedy.

In January 2014, a federal court granted $65 million of fees to the trustees handling Namvar's bankruptcy, with the fees being in respect of "the nearly five years of managing the bankruptcy, fighting the numerous lawsuits revolving around the bankruptcy and liquating the remaining assets". Namco's creditors lost up to $500 million.

== Philanthropy ==
Namvar served on the board of trustees of the Nessah Synagogue in Beverly Hills. With his family, he made charitable contributions to the synagogue, where a plaque is named in their honor. It reads, "The dedication of the Hakham Yedidia Shofet Sanctuary was possible by the donation of [the] Namvar Family." The family has also donated "$5 million toward a military housing center south of Tel Aviv in Israel.

== Personal life ==
He is married to Ilana Namvar. They reside in Brentwood, Los Angeles, California.
