= Blando =

Blando is a surname. Notable people with the surname include:

- Brian Blando (born 1995), Argentine footballer
- Deborah Blando (born 1969), Italian-Brazilian singer, songwriter, and producer
- Gabriel Blando (born 1925), Colombian fencer
- Marcelo Blando, Philippine Brigadier General and farmer
- Oscar Blando (1924–1994), Italian film actor

== See also ==
- Blandi, another surname
