= Eden Cemetery =

Eden Cemetery may refer to:

- Eden Memorial Park Cemetery, Mission Hills, California
- Eden Cemetery (Collingdale, Pennsylvania), listed on the National Register of Historic Places in Delaware County, Pennsylvania
