= WashAndGo =

WashAndGo may refer to:

- A shampoo produced by Vidal Sassoon
- A computer program for Microsoft Windows by Abelssoft to remove garbage and unneeded files, see WashAndGo (software)
