= Angelfist =

1993 film by Cirio H. Santiago

- Directed by: Cirio H. Santiago
- Written by: Anthony L. Greene
- Produced by: Roger Corman; Cirio H. Santiago
- Starring: Catya Sassoon; Michael Shaner; Melissa Moore
- Cinematography: Joe Batac
- Edited by: Edgardo Vinarao
- Music by: Stephen Cohn
- Production company: Hollywood Road Films
- Distributed by: Concorde-New Horizons
- Release date: 1993
- Running time: 80 minutes
- Country: United States
- Language: English

Angelfist is a 1993 martial arts film starring Catya Sassoon, Michael Shaner, and Melissa Moore. Directed by Cirio H. Santiago, the film was produced by Santiago and Roger Corman.

== Synopsis ==
An assassination in the Philippines is caught on film by kickboxer Christy, which leads to her death at the hands of radicals intent on disrupting peace talks. Her sister Kat, a Los Angeles police officer, comes to Manila to try and bring the people responsible to justice. She enters a kickboxing tournament in order to get closer to the murderers, and begins unravelling the twisted plan while narrowly evading the wrath of the Death Brigades.

== Reception ==
In his book on martial arts in American cinema, M. Ray Lott said Angelfist was "much more interested in showing [Catya Sassoon] as a sexual object" than would be the case in a film with Cynthia Rothrock, the usual figure in that subgenre. Her nude appearance resulted in her being "almost launched as soft-porn action heroine". Lott called the film itself "a titillating exploitation vehicle for undiscriminating action audiences" and acknowledged that "[i]t knows its target audience".

== Cast ==
- Catya Sassoon as Katara "Kat" Lang
- Melissa Moore as Lorda
- Michael Shaner as Alcatraz
- Denise Buick as Fighter 1
- Jessica Roberts as Fighter2
- Roland Dantes as Bayani
- Joseph Zucchero as Victor Winslow
- Henry Stralskowski as Cirio Quirino
- Christina Portugal as Bontoc "Gold Tooth"
- Ken Metcalfe as Ambassador Franklin
- Tony Carrion as Mr. Carrion
- Sibel Birzag as Kristie Lang
- Shiela Lintan as Sulu
- [Jim Moss] as Miles Jarvis
- [John Crank] as Colonel Rappaport
- Bob Larson as Mr. Donaldson
- Eddie Gaerlan as Super
- Archie Ramos as Bartender
- Ramon D'Salva as De Vega/Ring Announcer
- Ruben Ramos as Referee
- Toytoy Torres as Totoy Tigas
- Dulce V. Del Pilar as Newscaster
- Paul Holmes as Reporter
- Joanne Griffen as Winslow's Secretary

Members of the Black Brigade: *Ronald Asinas*Manny Samson *Sonny Tuason *Carlito Varca *Jett Sahara*Larry Correa *Raul Garcia

Fighters: *Susan De Guzman *Marissa Salgo *Lily Correa *Maria Houstman *Fedelia Chok *Christina Sanchez

Mexican Drug Dealers: *Romy Diaz *Robert Miller *Richard Olney *Mark Nilo Odiaman
