= Kale Browne =

American actor (born 1950)

- Born: David Charles Browne; June 16, 1950 (age 76); San Rafael, California, U.S.
- Occupation: Actor
- Years active: 1980–present
- Spouse: Karen Allen (m. 1988; div. 1998)
- Children: 1

David Charles "Kale" Browne (born June 16, 1950) is an American actor.

== Biography ==
He was born in San Rafael, California. Browne was the first to play the roles of Michael Hudson on Another World (1986–1993, 1995–1998) and Sam Rappaport on One Life to Live (1998–2001).

== Personal life ==
Browne has a son, Nicholas (b. 1990), with former wife Karen Allen, to whom he was married from 1988 to 1998. Their son is a personal chef, who won a competition on a 2016 episode of the reality tv series Chopped.

== Filmography ==
=== Film ===
Year	Title	Role	Notes
1982	Losin' It	Larry	
1992	Bloodfist IV: Die Trying	Weiss	
1997	'Til There Was You	Vince Dawkan	
2000	Just for the Time Being	Plumber	Uncredited
2007	Half Past Dead 2	Governor Adams	
2008	MARy	Greg	
2015	Damsel	Gary	
2016	Like Lambs	Headmaster Daniels	
2021	I'm Not Him	Dr. Horwitz	
2025	Honey Don't!	Honey's Father	

=== Television ===
Year	Title	Role	Notes
1980	Dallas	KKGB Reporter / Reporter #2	2 episodes
1980	Mr. and Mrs. and Mr.	Jimmy York	TV movie
1981	It's a Living	Barry Schofield	Episode: "Our Man Barry"
1981	Nero Wolfe	Paul Shane	Episode: "Before I Die"
1981	Knots Landing	Paul Fairgate	Episode: "Players"
1981	Scruples	Kenny Higgins	TV movie
1981	Death of a Centerfold	Sidney	TV movie
1981	Dynasty	Doctor	2 episodes
1982	Lou Grant	Chris Maitland	Episode: "Fireworks"
1982, 1983	General Hospital	David Arlen	2 episodes
1983	Baby Makes Five	Old Flame	Episode: "Jennie's Old Flame"
1983	Hill Street Blues	Byron Whitcamp	4 episodes
1985	Alfred Hitchcock Presents	Amanda's Father	Episode: "Pilot"
1985	CBS Schoolbreak Special	Mr. Moiner	Episode: "The War Between the Classes"
1986	Webster	Kevin	Episode: "Borrowed Time"
1986–1993, 1995–1998	Another World	Michael Hudson	180 episodes
1990	Challenger	Steven J. McAuliffe	TV movie
1992	L.A. Law	Alec Weston	Episode: "Wine Knot"
1993	Woman on the Ledge	Elliott	TV movie
1994	Matlock	Brian Lowry	Episode: "The Idol"
1994	The Cosby Mysteries	Russell Bonner	Episode: "Our Lady of Cement"
1998–1999, 2001–2002	One Life to Live	Sam Rappaport	28 episodes
2002	JAG	Capt. Shaw	Episode: "Port Chicago"
2003	The Another World Reunion	Michael Hudson	TV movie
2004	Huff	Ralph Johnson	Episode: "Control"
2005, 2006	Dr. Vegas	Crystal's father	2 episodes
2006	Strong Medicine	Jonas' Lawyer	Episode: "Special Delivery"
2006–2008	Days of Our Lives	Dr. Miles Berman	16 episodes
2007	Cold Case	Cliff Burrell (2007)	Episode: "Offender"
2008	Without a Trace	Malcolm Pope	Episode: "22 x 42"
2009	Law & Order	Dale Thornhill	Episode: "Bailout"
2016	Codes of Conduct	Paul Rotmensen	Episode: "Pilot"
2022	Mike	Billy Cayton	Miniseries, 3 episodes

=== Radio dramas ===
Year	Title	Role	Notes
1981	Star Wars	Biggs Darklighter	3 episodes

=== Video games ===
Year	Title	Role
2018	Red Dead Redemption 2	Grizzled Jon
