= Beverly Adams =

Canadian-American actress and author

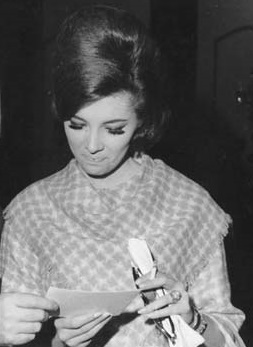
- Adams in 1960
- Born: November 7, 1945 (age 80); Edmonton, Alberta, Canada
- Other name: Beverly Sassoon
- Occupations: Actress, author
- Years active: 1963–1999
- Spouses: Vidal Sassoon (m. 1967; div. 1981) Antonio Migoni (annulled): Philip Neal
- Children: 4, including Catya Sassoon

Beverly Sassoon (née Adams; born November 7, 1945) is a Canadian-American actress and author.

== Early life ==
Adams was born in Edmonton, Alberta, Canada, but is a citizen of the United States. She is the daughter of Wayne Adams and his wife. Raised Roman Catholic, she moved with her family to Burbank, California after the war where, as a teen, she competed in and won beauty contests before becoming an actress. She began working as a model while she was a student at Valley State College.

Adams, who initially wanted to become a doctor, had a weekend job in a dress shop while she worked during the week as secretary to a Superior Court judge in Los Angeles. When the dress shop had a fashion show televised, Adams modeled some of the dresses. An advertising man saw her modeling on that broadcast and invited her to make a commercial at a local television station. Ozzie Nelson was at the station at the same time, and he invited her to play a bit part in an episode of The Adventures of Ozzie and Harriet.

== Acting ==
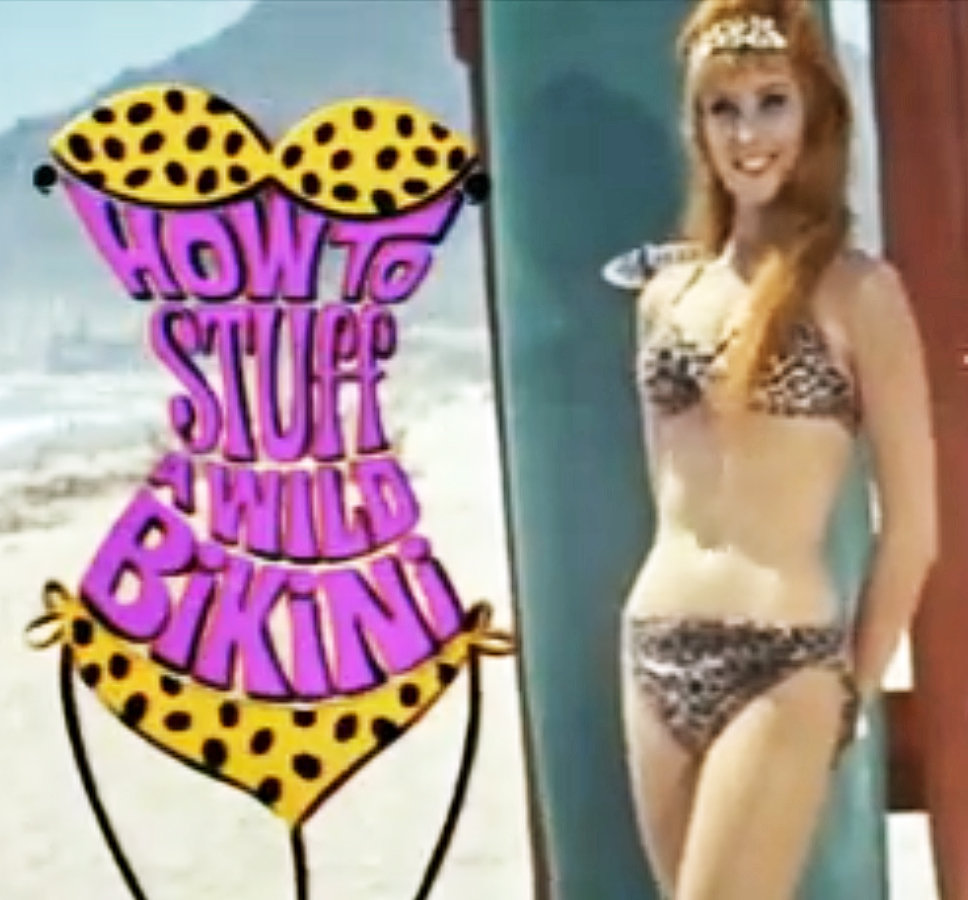
Beverly Adams in trailer for How to Stuff a Wild Bikini (1965)

Adams appeared in various guest roles in television series of the 1960s, including a recurring role on the Dr. Kildare TV series. She was selected for Columbia Pictures' New Talent Program and was signed to a contract where she appeared on several Screen Gems television series and several films, including the recurring role of Lovey Kravezit in the Matt Helm movies starring Dean Martin.

After appearing uncredited in two films with Elvis Presley, Roustabout and Girl Happy, she played the redheaded Cassandra in How to Stuff a Wild Bikini.

== Post-acting career ==
During her retirement from acting, Adams, going by her married name of Beverly Sassoon, published several books and served as a spokeswoman for Vidal Sassoon, Inc.

She launched her own line of pet care products, Beverly Sassoon Pet Care System.

== Personal life ==
Adams met hairstylist Vidal Sassoon when she was sent to his London salon while she was filming Torture Garden. They married on February 16, 1967.

They had four children, including Catya. In 1981, the couple divorced, and Adams returned to acting. She married a matador, Antonio Migoni, but the marriage was annulled. Adams later married Philip Neal, whom she described as "the love of my life". Neal died in 2008.

In November 2022, Adams was profiled in Classic Images, where she discussed her onscreen career.

== Filmography ==
Year	Title	Role	Notes
1963	The Adventures of Ozzie and Harriet	Gloria	Episode: "Wally's Pen Pal"
1964	Channing	The 1st Coed	Episode: "My Son, the All-American"
1964	Dr. Kildare	Various roles	2 episodes
1964	The New Interns	Lisa	Uncredited
1964	Roustabout	Cora	Uncredited
1964–1965	Burke's Law	Various roles	3 episodes
1965	Girl Happy	Girl #2	Uncredited
1965	Bewitched	Dora "D. D." Danger O'Riley	Episode: "George the Warlock"
1965	How to Stuff a Wild Bikini	Cassandra	
1965	Gidget	Treasure	Episode: "In God, and Nobody Else, We Trust"
1965	Winter A-Go-Go	Jo Ann Wallace	
1965	Camp Runamuck	Pretty woman	Episode: "The New Swimming Pool"
1966	The Silencers	Lovey Kravezit	
1966	Birds Do It	Claudine Wald	
1966	Se Tutte le Donne del Mondo	Karin	Alternative title: If All the Women in the World
1966	Murderers' Row	Lovey Kravezit	
1967	Devil's Angels	Lynn	
1967	The Ambushers	Lovey Kravezit	
1967	Torture Garden	Carla Hayes	
1968	Hammerhead	Ivory	
1980	Quincy, M.E.	Dr. Jerri McCracken	Episode: "New Blood"
1982	CHiPs	Vanessa	Episode: "Head Over Heels"
1992	Silk Stalkings	Anna Alexis	Episode: "Baser Instincts"
1996	Mind Games	Board Member #1	
1996	The Guilt	Vivian Cornell	Episode: "Dean's Office"
1997–1999	Profiler	Various roles	2 episodes

== Awards nominations ==
Year	Award	Category	Result
1967	Laurel Awards	Female New Face	Nominated
