= Hamid Gabbay =

Iranian architect (born c. 1943)

- Born: 1942 or 1943 (age 83–84); Iran
- Education: University of Florence (PhD, 1971)
- Occupation: Architect

Hamid Gabbay (born c. 1943) is an Iranian-born American architect. He was a professor at the University of Tehran and a prolific architect in Iran prior to the Iranian Revolution. Since he emigrated to the United States in 1978, he has designed many buildings and private residences in Beverly Hills, California.

== Early life ==
Hamid Gabbay was born circa 1943 in Iran. He received a PhD in architecture from the University of Florence in 1971.

== Career ==
Gabbay started his career as an architect in Iran, where he co-founded Gabbay Architects, an architectural firm with his brother. He became a professor at the University of Tehran. Shortly before the Iranian Revolution, Gabbay emigrated to the United States in 1978.

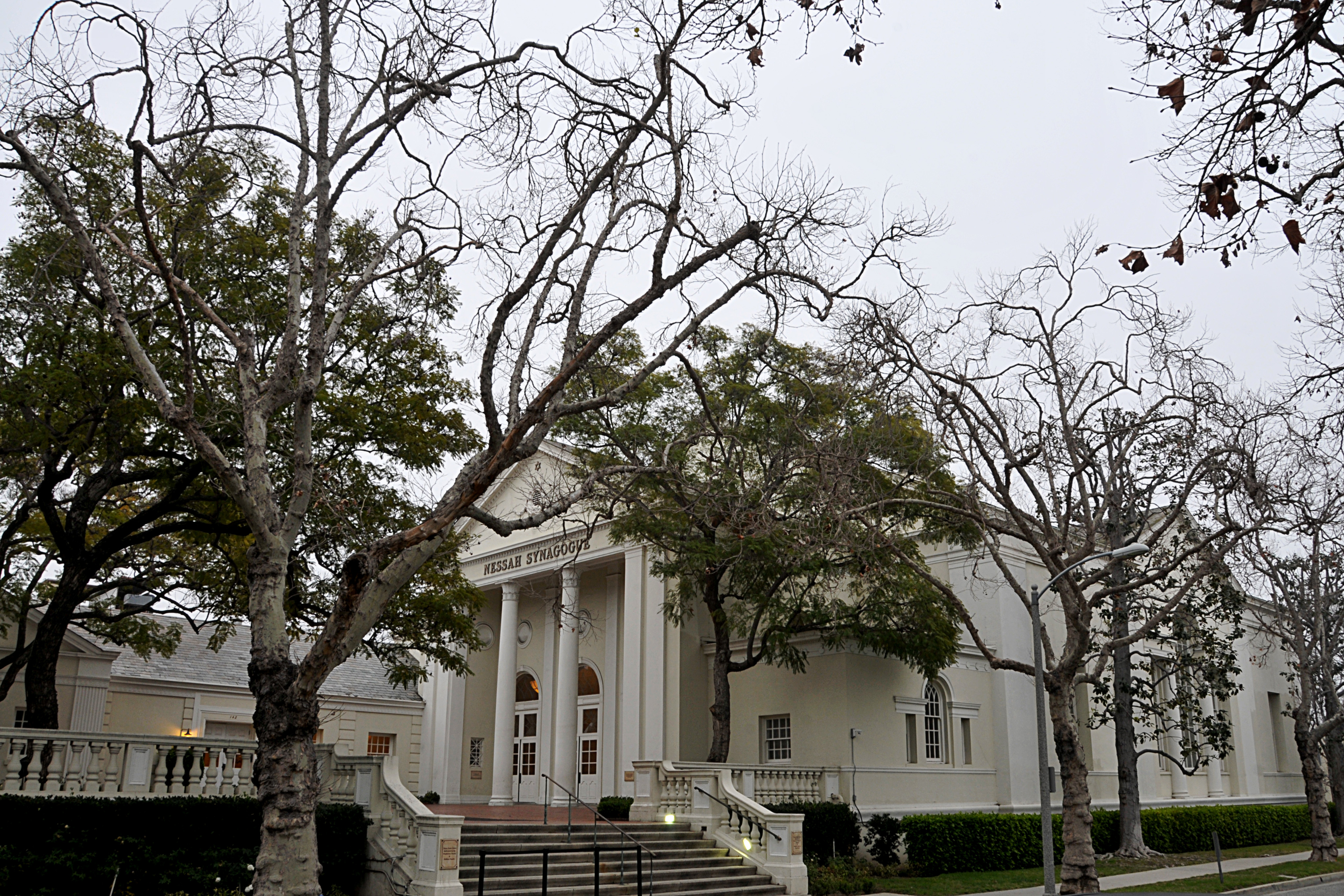
The Nessah Synagogue, remodelled by Gabbay in 2002.

Gabbay is an architect in Beverly Hills, California. He remodeled the Nessah Synagogue in 2002. He was the 2015 recipient of the Will Rogers Award for Best Historic commercial development for his remodelling of 479 North Rodeo Drive (home to designer store Badgley Mischka).

Gabbay is opposed to "Persian palaces." He believes that it "has nothing to do with Persian architecture," adding, "I never saw anything like it in Tehran."

Gabbay chaired the Design Review Commission of the City of Beverly Hills in 2004. He is a donor to the Beverly Hills 9/11 Memorial Garden. Additionally, he serves on the board of the Wallis Annenberg Center for the Performing Arts.
