= Stephen Cohn =

American composer

Stephen Cohn is an American composer of concert and film music living in Los Angeles, California. His compositional style embraces an expanded tonality with a 21st-century perspective.

== Early life ==
Cohn was born and raised in Los Angeles, California. His father was an attorney who wrote chamber music as a hobby as his mother was a dancer and violinist and his sister a flutist. He studied the clarinet as a child and later, classical guitar.

Cohn attended Whitman College in Washington and finished his Bachelor of Science Degree with a major in music at California State University at Northridge. [11]

== Career ==
Stephen's first public work came courtesy of the mid-1960s folk quartet The Pleasure Fair, also featuring guitarist and songwriter Robb Royer. The group released their first single in 1966 under the name of The Rainy Day People, before becoming The Pleasure Fair and issuing a self-titled LP the following year. In 1973, he released a self-titled solo album on Motown Records.

His first string quartet, Eye of Chaos, was premiered by the Arditti Quartet, who also recorded the work for release on an Albany Records CD entitled Arditti Quartet California Composers. His chamber orchestra work Noah’s Rhythm was premiered at the Los Angeles County Museum of Art, conducted by Pulitzer Prize winning composer Steven Stucky. His violin duet Matin Sur les Collines de Ceret was performed at the Otzberg Summer Festival in Germany. In 2006, his orchestral work Finale, from Two Together, an American Folk Music Suite was premiered by the Kansas City Symphony. The same work is part of an At Peace Media CD release which won at Parents' Choice Gold Award in 2003. In 2006, his work for choir and chamber orchestra commissioned by the Foundation for Universal Sacred Music, entitled The Family of God, was premiered at Merkin Hall in New York City.

His concert works have been performed and recorded by orchestras and chamber music ensembles in the United States and Europe such as the Arditti Quartet, the Kansas City Symphony, the Prague Philharmonic, the Chroma String Quartet, the Eclipse Quartet, Palomar, and the Midnight Winds. He has been Composer-in-Residence at The International Encounters of Catalonia in France, and he has been commissioned to compose new works which have been performed in Los Angeles, New York, Chicago, Fort Worth, Kearney, Tempe, Jacksonville, Black Mountain, Hoover, Montgomery, Huntsville, and in Europe and Asia in Rome, Brussels, Ceret, Passau, Berlin, Orihuela, China (various cities), and Prague.

He won an Emmy Award for "Outstanding Achievement in Music", and his scores have been part of many award-winning productions and feature films which included such stars as Lily Tomlin, Joanne Woodward, Kathleen Quinlan, Colleen Dewhurst, William Shatner, and Wallace Shawn. He has received a Parents’ Choice Gold Award for his CD release “Two Together, An American Folk Music Suite”.

Other premieres include:

- Metaphors and Contrasts for woodwind quintet
- Essay for Guitar and Dance in the Dream for Classical Guitar
- The Giver of Stars for cappella choir
- Seven Dances for piano
- Winter Soul for string quartet (reviewed in the Huffington Post)
- Sea Change for Pierrot Ensemble
- American Spring for string trio and marimba (reviewed in the Huffington Post)
- Aerial Perspectives and Aria for Winds (premiered in Los Angeles and reviewed in LA Opus).

Other commissions include Pacific Serenades, Chamber Music Palisades, Red Cedar Chamber Music, and The Shumei Arts Council.

== Awards ==
He was given an Emmy Award for “Outstanding Achievement in Music” for his chamber orchestra score for the documentary "Dying with Dignity", starring Colleen Dewhurst.

He received a commission by the American Composers Forum for his work Curfew Must Not Ring Tonight.

== Material ==
=== Performances ===
A selected list of performances of music by Stephen Cohn is below.

- Eye of Chaos – Los Angeles – 1991, Belgium – 1993, London – 1995, Ceret, France – 2004,
- Noah's Rhythm – Los Angeles – 1994
- Matin Sur Les Collines de Ceret Ceret, France – 1996, 2002, Otzberg, Germany – 2004,
- Moods Of a Goddess – Chicago, 2000, Ceret, France – 2002,
- Out of the Ashes – Ceret, France – 2002,
- Anticipation of Light – The International Musical Encounters of Catalonia – 2004,
- Where is Peace? – Mixed Choir – Fort Worth – 2004
- Evolution and Remembrance – Ceret, France – 2004,
- The Family of God – Merkin Hall, New York City – 2006,
- Finale, from Two Together, An American Folk Music Suite – Kansas City Symphony – 2007,
- Metaphors and Contrasts – The Midnight Winds – Los Angeles – 2008,
- Anticipation of Light – The Jung Trio – Los Angeles – 2008,
- Essay for Guitar – Shiri Coneh – Berlin – 2009
- A Warrior's Paradox – Stephen B. Cook – Los Angeles – 2010,
- Moods of a Goddess – Stephen B. Cook – Los Angeles – 2010,
- Seven Dances – Stephen B. Cook – Los Angeles – 2010,
- Aria for Winds – for woodwind quartet, premiered March 2015 at Shumei Hall.
- Aerial Perspectives – for flute, viola, cello and piano in March 2105 at St. Mathews Parish as part of the Chamber Music Palisades Series.
- Heart Logic – for string quartet, premiered April 2014 at Shumei Hall.
- Eight Little Inventions for Voice and Cello – premiered February 2014 in Los Angeles.
- Elegy for the Black Sheep – cello solo, premiered September 2013.
- Bellscape – for oboe, clarinet, French horn, bassoon and piano, premiered on the Pacific Serenades Series, in Los Angeles, June 2013.
- Awakenings – for flute, French Horn, violin, cello and piano, premiered at Shumei Hall in April, 2013.
- Frisson – for piano solo, premiered at Piano Spheres Series at Zipper Hall, Los Angeles, February 2013.
- American Spring – for string trio and Marimba – premiered in Shumei Hall in April 2012.
- Dance in the Dream Garden – for classical guitar, premiered in Passau, Germany in March 2012.
- Sea Change – for Pierrot ensemble, premiered in Shumei Hall in April 2011.
- Winter Soul – for string quartet, premiered by The Eclipse Quartet at The Armory Center for the Arts on January 25, 2011.
- From Whence It Came – for violin and piano, premiered by Panic Duo at Beyond Baroque in 2015
- Curfew Must Not Ring Tonight – for flute, violin, guitar, speaker and cello Iowa City 2015
- Close-Ups (Through Tiny Eyes), piano, Nadia Shpachenko in Los Angeles (2016)
- Uv’ Chein – for choir and chamber orchestra, Los Angeles 2017
- The Beat Goes On – for piano, Bonn, Germany 2017
- Grace from the Chess Master – for clarinet, violin and cello, Red Cedar Chamber Music in Iowa City (2018).
- Love and Life – for violin, cello and performance artist, premiered by Red Cedar Chamber Music with Akwi Nji in Iowa City (2018).

=== Film and television scores ===
A selected list of material that has been used or featured in film and television pieces, is found below.

- Dying with Dignity – Emmy Award – Outstanding Achievement in Music
- Carlton Your Doorman – MTM Productions/CBS – Emmy Award Winning Production
- Nickel & Dime – feature film – Columbia/RCA
- Hunger in the Promised Land – Emmy Award Winning Production
- Land of the Free – feature film, PM Entertainment
- Pitch – feature film, Nucleus Entertainment
- Angelfist – feature film, Concorde/New Horizons
- Normality – short film, Tango Productions
- Under the Rainbow – feature film (orchestrations) – Warner Brothers Pictures
