= The Pleasure Fair =

US musical group

- Origin: Los Angeles, California, United States
- Genres: Soft rock, Folk rock
- Years active: 1964-1967
- Labels: Hanna-Barbera Records, Uni Records
- Past members: Robb Royer; Tim Hallinan; Michele Cochrane; Stephen Cohn

The Pleasure Fair was a musical performing group based in Los Angeles in the mid-1960s. The original group membership included Robb Royer, Tim Hallinan, Michele Cochrane and Stephen Cohn.

Robb Royer obtained his first guitar when he was 19 years old and a college sophomore at San Fernando Valley State College in Northridge (now California State University at Northridge). He met Tim Hallinan at the school. "Finally, when I began playing guitar, the scales tipped and Tim saw reason to talk to me. He liked to sing and I liked to play."

The two began to perform together as "Robb & Tim" and then later added the talent of Michele Cochrane. Hallinan recalled "What I remember best about Michele was, first, that she could actually sing. I was just faking it, doing what I’ve done since I was born, an approach to life that begins with the words, 'Act like you can –' In this case, it was sing. But Michele actually could; she had a glorious voice."

Soon the trio became a quartet with the addition of Stephen Cohn, who had previously graduated from Valley State's music department, whom they had seen when he gave a senior recital in classical guitar. The group called themselves by various names, the most notable being "The Pleasure Fair" and by 1966 they managed to obtain a recording contract for a single with Hanna Barbera Records under the name "The Rainy Day People". "Junior Executive" was the "A" side, backed with "I'm Telling It To You" (both songs written by Cohn, Hallinan and Royer)

The group signed a recording contract with Uni Records in 1967 David Gates was hired as the arranger and conductor for the Pleasure Fair's self-titled album. The album comprised twelve songs, eight of which were original compositions by Royer, Hallinan and Cohn with one additional song written by Cohn.

They can briefly be seen performing in Ep7, S1 "Tagged for Murder" of the TV series Ironside.

Royer's song "Say What You See" (co-written with Tim Hallinan) was produced in 1968 by Jimmy Griffin and arranged by David Gates. It was sung by a trio calling themselves The Curtain Calls. Soon afterward in the same year the three founding members of Bread (Royer, Griffin and Gates) combined forces as their own group.

Their song "Morning Glory Days" charted at number 34 on the Bubbling Under Hot 100 in July 1967, making it their only song to chart on the main Billboard single charts.

== The Pleasure Fair (LP) ==
The Pleasure Fair - Uni Records, 1967

1. "Stay Around For The Good Times" (R. Royer - T. Hallinan - S. Cohn)
2. "Turnaway" (R. Royer - T. Hallinan - S. Cohn)
3. "Come To The Sunshine" (Van Dyke Parks)
4. "Nursery Rhyme" (R. Royer - T. Hallinan - S. Cohn)
5. "Remember Who I Am" (R. Royer - T. Hallinan - S. Cohn)
6. "Barefoot In The Park" (Johnny Mercer - Neal Hefti)
7. "Morning Glory Days" (R. Royer - T. Hallinan - S. Cohn)
8. "Fade In Fade Out" (R. Royer - T. Hallinan - S. Cohn)
9. "East West" (Graham Gouldman)
10. "The Things We Said Today" (John Lennon - Paul McCartney)
11. "Talk" (D. Gere - S. Cohn)
12. "Put It Out Of Your Mind" (R. Royer - T. Hallinan - S. Cohn)

- The Pleasure Fair - Robb Royer - Michele Cochrane - Tim Hallinan - Steve Cohn
- Producer, Arranger and Conductor - David Gates
- Engineer - Allan Todd
- Original Cover Photography - Fred Seligo
- Original Cover Design - Bernard Yeszin Graphics
