= Vidal Sassoon International Center for the Study of Antisemitism =

Israeli research centre

- Location: Hebrew University of Jerusalem; Mount Scopus, Jerusalem, Israel; 9190501
- Website: sicsa.huji.ac.il

Vidal Sassoon International Center for the Study of Antisemitism (SICSA) (Hebrew: המרכז הבינלאומי לחקר האנטישמיות ע"ש וידאל ששון) is a research center affiliated with the Hebrew University of Jerusalem. It was named for Vidal Sassoon, who financed its establishment in 1983.

The Vidal Sassoon center is as an interdisciplinary research center devoted to the independent, non-political accumulation and dissemination of materials related to antisemitism.

The center awards Felix Posen Fellowships to doctoral candidates whose dissertation focuses on some aspect of antisemitism.

== Publications ==
The center has produced book-length studies, collections of papers presented at conferences, occasional papers, and a journal.

The ACTA series is an annual report from a special SICSA research unit that analyses current trends in antisemitism and explores the influence of anti-Jewish and anti-Zionist ideology on public opinion, and the arts, mass media, and political movements.

As a supplement to the ACTA series, the Posen Papers aim to provide a more rapid response to issues of global antisemitism. Antisemitism International is a semi-annual research journal that focuses on topics of current importance.

In 1984, the Center initiated a bibliographic project on antisemitism. It comprises a computerized database of works published in most English and most European languages about antisemitism throughout the world in every period, including the events of the Holocaust.

An increasing number of books and articles have been written on the topic since 1945; whether popular or scholarly, descriptive or interpretative. Prior to the establishment of the bibliographic project these publications were not listed in a way that permitted optimal use of them by scholars and students, as well as to enhance public awareness of the subject.

For the purpose of the bibliography, antisemitism is defined as antagonism toward Jews and Judaism as expressed in writings (i.e. in religious texts, polemical literature, and works of fiction), in the visual arts (i.e. art, caricatures, posters, and film), and in actions (i.e. massacres and pogroms, discriminatory legislation, and the Holocaust).

The online database is accessible through the Israel University Inter-Library Network and the Center’s website. It also appears as a series of printed volumes entitled Antisemitism — An Annotated Bibliography published by K. G. Saur Verlag, Munich, Germany.

== Conferences, symposia and lectures ==
Throughout the academic year, the Center sponsors international conferences on such topics as Demonizing the Other and Antisemitism and Multiculturalism. A number of lectures and presentations from its conferences are available as streaming audio and/or video files on the Center’s website.

Monthly lectures on topics currently researched by scholars supported by or affiliated with the Center are held on the Hebrew University campus.
