= Brad Morrow =

American actor (1942–1997)

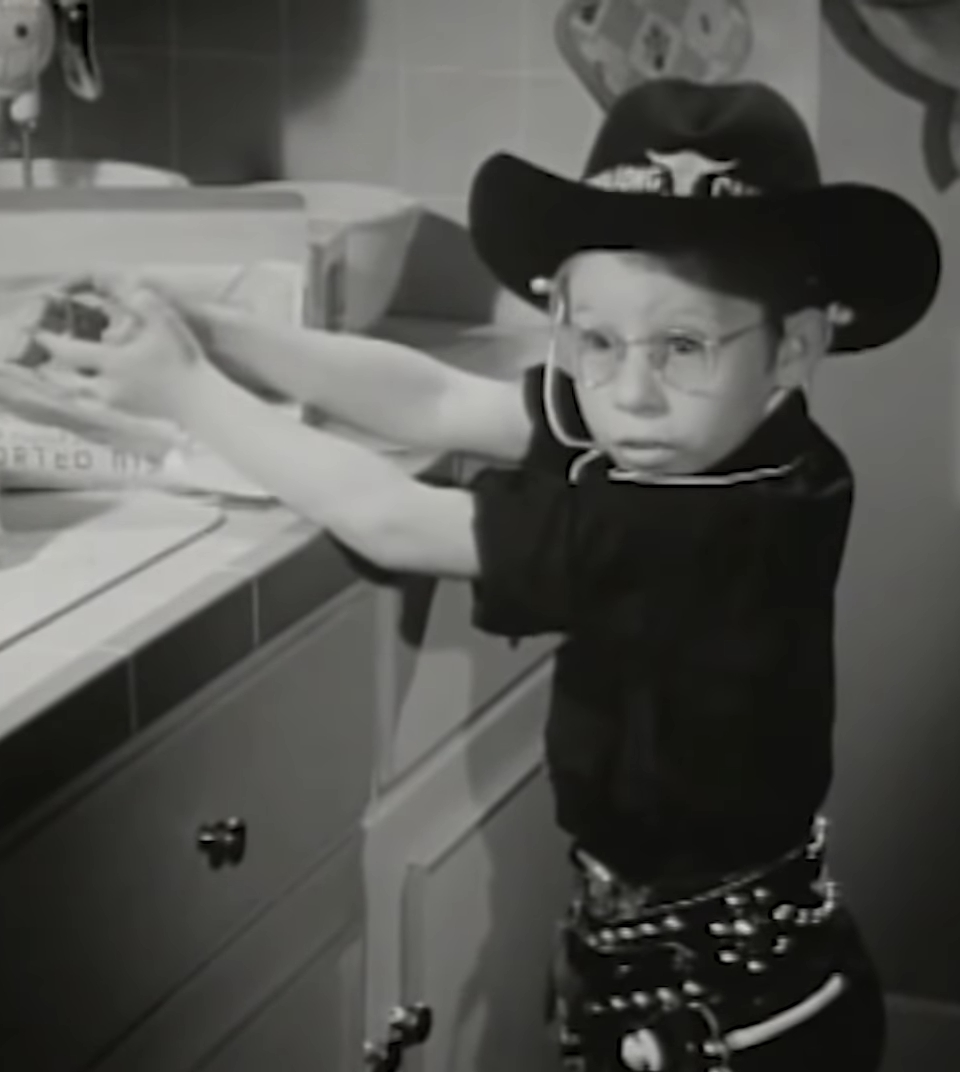
- Morrow in Cause for Alarm! (1951)
- Born: Bradley Steven Mora; May 12, 1942; Chicago, Illinois, U.S.
- Died: November 7, 1997 (aged 55); Northridge, Los Angeles, California, U.S.
- Resting place: Eden Memorial Park Cemetery
- Other name: Bradley Mora
- Occupation: Actor
- Years active: 1950–1963
- Spouse: Marilyn Keenberg (m. 1965)

Brad Morrow, (born Bradley Steven Mora; May 12, 1942 – November 7, 1997) also known as Bradley Mora, was a child actor who appeared on Broadway, in film and on television beginning at the age of two. He played young Tim, Hugh Beaumont's son, in the episode The Big Squeeze of The Adventures of Superman (season 2, ep.2, 1953).

== Career ==
Morrow was spotted in New York by MGM and appeared in TV and films during the 1950s. He worked for Disney where he was cast as a Mousketeer before being pulled from the project to appear in Disney's Spin and Marty series. He appeared in a 1957 episode of The Adventures of Jim Bowie as 'Peter'. As a young adult, he changed his name to Morrow and toured with the stage productions of both West Side Story and The Diary of Anne Frank. In 1961, he appeared in the final episode of the television police drama The Asphalt Jungle.

== Later life and death ==
After his acting career ended, he married Marilyn Keenberg in 1965. Morrow later went into business management and was president of CII Premium Finance in Burbank, California, when he resigned because of ill health and died of cancer a year later at the age of 55. He is buried in Eden Memorial Park Cemetery in Mission Hills, California.
