= Vidal Sassoon =

British hairstylist (1928–2012)

Vidal Sassoon CBE
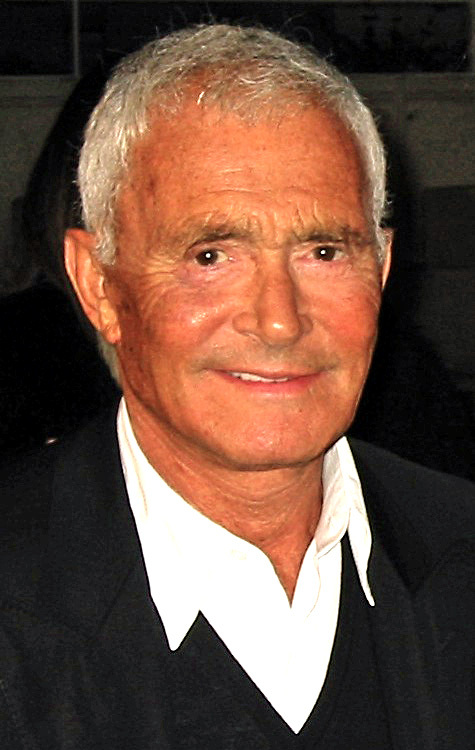
- Sassoon in 2006
- Born: 17 January 1928; Hammersmith, London, England
- Died: 9 May 2012 (aged 84); Los Angeles, California, U.S.
- Citizenship: United Kingdom; United States (from 1972)‍
- Occupations: Hairstylist; businessman
- Notable work: five-point cut
- Spouses: Elaine Wood (m. 1956; div. 1958) Beverly Adams (m. 1967; div. 1981) Jeanette Hartford-Davis (m. 1983, divorced) Rhonda "Ronnie" Holbrook (m. 1992)
- Children: 4, including Catya and Eden
- Website: sassoon.com

Vidal Sassoon (17 January 1928 – 9 May 2012) was a British hairstylist and businessman. He was a pioneer of modern haircuts, structuring hair by cutting rather than styling. In particular he popularised a simple, close-cut geometric hairstyle called the five-point cut, worn by fashion designers including Mary Quant and film stars such as Mia Farrow, Goldie Hawn, Cameron Diaz, Nastassja Kinski and Helen Mirren.‍

His early life was one of extreme poverty, with seven years of his childhood spent in an orphanage. He quit school at age 14, soon holding various jobs in London during World War II. Although he hoped to become a professional footballer, he became an apprentice hairdresser at the suggestion of his mother.

After developing a reputation for his innovative cuts, he moved to Los Angeles in the early 1970s, where he opened the first worldwide chain of hairstyling salons, complemented by a line of hair-treatment products.‍

He sold his business interests in the early 1980s and began funding Israeli think tanks. In 2009, Sassoon was appointed CBE by Queen Elizabeth II at Buckingham Palace. Vidal Sassoon: The Movie, a documentary film about his life, was released in 2010. In 2012, he was among the British cultural icons selected by artist Sir Peter Blake to appear in a new version of his most famous artwork, the album cover for the Beatles' Sgt. Pepper's Lonely Hearts Club Band, to celebrate the British cultural figures of the prior six decades.‍

== Early life ==
Sassoon was born to Jewish parents in Hammersmith, West London, and lived nearby in Shepherd's Bush.‍ His mother, Betty (Bellin) (1900–1997),‍‍ an Ashkenazi Jew,‍ was born in Aldgate, in the East End of London, in 1900. Although she was surrounded by grinding poverty, Sassoon writes that she nonetheless resolved to make the best of her life.‍ Her family had emigrated to England from the Russian Empire in the 1880s to escape the antisemitism and pogroms then prevalent.‍ His father, Jack Sassoon, a Sephardi Jew,‍ was born in Thessaloniki, in the northern part of Greece.‍ They met in 1925 and married in 1927. They then moved to Shepherd's Bush, which contained a community of Greek Jews.‍ Sassoon had a younger brother, Ivor.‍

His father abandoned the family for another woman when Vidal was three years old.‍ With his mother now unable to support the family, they fell into poverty and were evicted, becoming suddenly homeless.‍ They were forced to move in with his mother's older sister. There, they shared a two-room tenement with his aunt and her three children. The tiny flat where the seven of them lived had no bathroom or inside toilet, forcing them to share the one outside landing toilet with three other families. He remembered often standing in line to use it in freezing weather. Their roof was also falling apart, which let rain pour through. "All we could see from our windows was the greyness of the tenement across the street", writes Sassoon. "There was ugliness all around."‍

Due to poverty as a single parent, his mother eventually placed Sassoon and his younger brother in a Jewish orphanage, where they stayed for seven years,‍ until he was 11, when his mother remarried.‍ His mother was allowed to visit them only once a month and was never allowed to take them out.

=== Education ===
He attended Essendine Road Primary School, a Christian school of about a thousand children. He was frequently taunted by classmates as a "Yid" or with chants of "All Jews have long noses".‍ One of his proudest days at the school was winning the 100-yard dash in an all-school contest. "The urge to win has never left me", he writes.‍

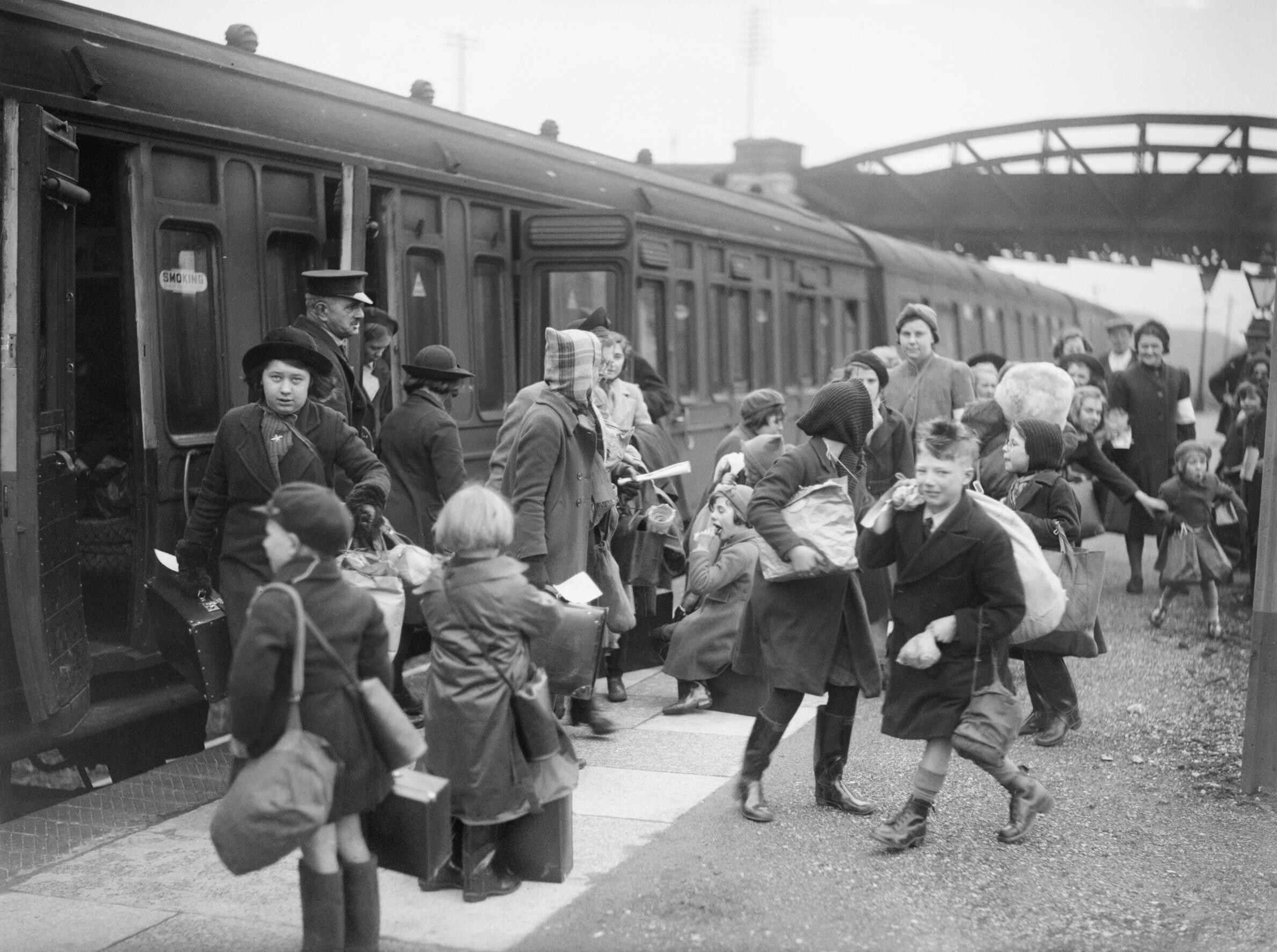
British children being evacuated to the countryside during WWII

However, he says that he was "a very bad student" with abysmal grades in most classes, except for mental arithmetic. After one session of mental arithmetic, his master said teasingly, "Sassoon, it is a pleasure to see that you have gaps of intelligence between bouts of ignorance".‍ He took a volunteer job as a choir boy for the local synagogue, which gave him one of the few chances to see his mother, who would come on Saturdays.‍

Sassoon and the other children at the school were evacuated after WWII began on 3 September 1939. He was 11 years old. "It's a date I'll never forget", he said. "Suddenly my brother and I and all our fellow orphans were on trains with hundreds of thousands of other kids, moving out of London."‍ He and his brother were taken to Holt, Wiltshire, a small village of a thousand people.‍

=== First jobs ===
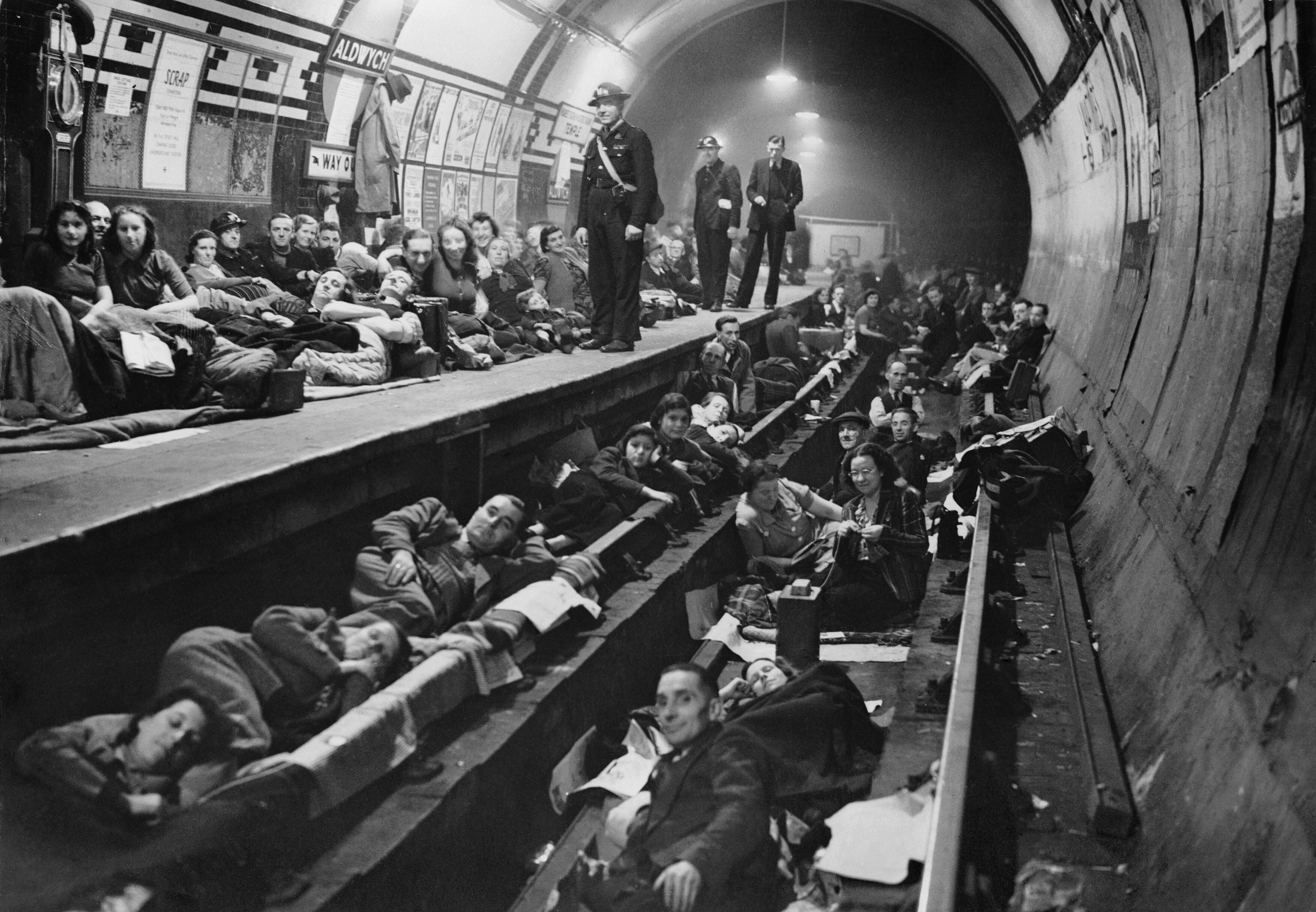
London Underground bomb shelter in London during World War II

After his return to London, he left school at the age of 14 and worked as a messenger. The war was in full force with London still being bombed, which forced him to sleep in underground shelters. During work hours, he said "I got used to seeing bodies and blood, and hearing cries of agony" as he carried messages from central London to the docks.‍

Upon the insistence of his mother, they tried to get him into a hairdressing apprenticeship; his mother told him that her ambition was for him to become a professional hairdresser.‍ However, he saw himself becoming a football player, a sport he excelled at. "I could not imagine myself backcombing hair and winding up rollers for a living."‍‍‍

When she took him to the hairdressing school of a well-known stylist, Adolph Cohen, they were disappointed immediately when they were told it was a two-year programme and would cost much more than they could afford. "My mother looked so terribly dejected", he said, that as they left the salon, "I thought she might faint".‍ A few minutes later, Cohen called them back to the salon, then told him, "You seem to have very good manners, young man. Start Monday and forget the cost." His mother began to cry out of joy.‍

=== Political activities ===
At the age of 17, although he had been too young to serve in World War II, he became the youngest member of the 43 Group, a mostly Jewish veterans' underground organisation founded by Morris Beckman and several others which broke up fascist meetings in East London‍‍ to prevent Sir Oswald Mosley's movement from spreading "messages of hatred" in the period following World War II.‍

In 1948, at the age of 20, he joined the Palmach (which shortly afterwards was integrated into the Israel Defense Forces) and fought in the 1948 Arab–Israeli War, which began after Israel declared statehood.‍‍ Sassoon arrived in Mandatory Palestine in April 1948, a month before Israeli independence. He fought in the Negev against the Egyptian Army.‍ During an interview, he described the year he spent training with the Israelis as "the best year of my life", and recalled how he felt:

When you think of 2,000 years of being put down and suddenly you are a nation rising, it was a wonderful feeling. There were only 600,000 people defending the country against five armies, so everyone had something to do.‍

== Career ==
Sassoon resumed his hairdressing training under Raymond Bessone in his salon in Mayfair.‍ Sassoon opened his first salon in 1954 in London;‍ singer-actress Georgia Brown, his friend and neighbour, claimed to be his first customer.‍

Sassoon cutting Mia Farrow's hair for Rosemary's Baby in 1968

Sassoon stated his intentions in designing new, more efficient, hair styles: "If I was going to be in hairdressing, I wanted to change things. I wanted to eliminate the superfluous and get down to the basic angles of cut and shape."‍ Sassoon's works include the geometric perm and the "Nancy Kwan" hairstyles. They were all modern and low-maintenance. The hairstyles created by Sassoon relied on dark, straight, and shiny hair cut into geometric yet organic shapes. Peggy Moffitt’s hairstyle, an asymmetrical bowl cut‍ created by Sassoon, became known as the "five point".‍

In 1964, Sassoon created a short, angular hairstyle cut on a horizontal plane that was the recreation of the classic "bob cut". His geometric haircuts seemed to be severely cut, but were entirely lacquer-free, relying on the natural shine of the hair for effect. Advertising and cosmetics executive Natalie Donay is credited with discovering Sassoon in London and bringing him to the United States,‍ where in 1965, he opened his first New York City salon on Madison Avenue.‍

In 1966, inspired by 1920s film star Clara Bow's close-cropped hair, he created designs for Emanuel Ungaro. Director Roman Polanski brought him to Hollywood from London in 1968, at a cost of $5,000,‍ (Note: equivalent to $35,000 in 2025‍) to create a unique pixie cut for Mia Farrow, who was to star in Rosemary's Baby.‍

In the early 1970s, Sassoon made Los Angeles his home.‍ In 1971, he promoted his 30-year-old second-in-command, artistic director Roger Thompson, to director of the Sassoon salon, explaining jocularly that, "Twenty-five years of schlepping behind a barber chair are enough!"‍ John Paul DeJoria, a friend of Sassoon, co-founded Paul Mitchell Systems with Paul Mitchell, one of Sassoon's former students. Mitchell said that Sassoon was "the most famous hairstylist in the history of the world".‍

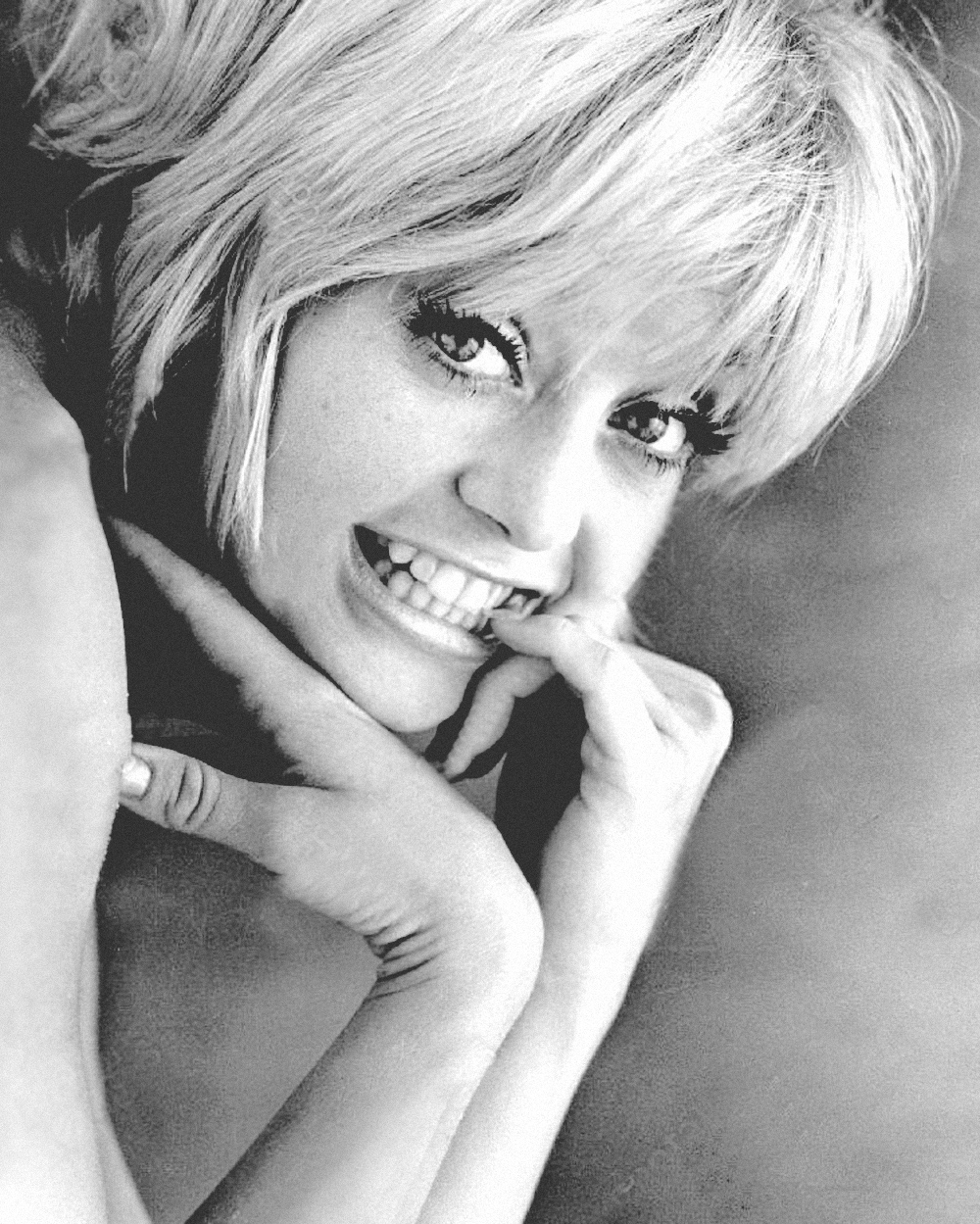
Goldie Hawn's bob cut in Cactus Flower (1969)

Sassoon began his "Vidal Sassoon" line of hair-care products in 1973.‍ The actor Michael Caine, who when young and struggling "was roommates with Terence Stamp and Vidal Sassoon – he used to cut my hair, and he always had a lot of models around",‍ claimed to have inspired this, saying, "I told him that he must have something that is working for him while he slept. I told him he had to make shampoos and other hair-care products."‍ Whatever the inspiration, Sassoon's brand was applied to shampoos and conditioners sold worldwide, with a commercial campaign featuring the slogan "If you don't look good, we don't look good."‍ Former salon colleagues also bought Sassoon's salons and acquired the right to use his name, extending the brand in salons into the United Kingdom and the United States.‍

The El Paso, Texas-based Helen of Troy Corporation began manufacturing and marketing Sassoon hair-care products in 1980.‍ In 1983, Richardson-Vicks purchased the Los Angeles-based Vidal Sassoon Inc.‍ as well as Sassoon's Santa Monica hairdressing school; the company had already bought his European businesses.‍ Sassoon's 1982 sales of hair products had topped $110 million,‍ (Note: equivalent to $310 million in 2025‍) with 80 percent of revenues coming from the US.‍

Two years later the company was bought by Procter & Gamble. Sassoon, who remained a consultant through at least the mid-1990s,‍ sued P&G in 2003 for allegedly neglecting the marketing of his brand in favour of the company's other hair product lines, such as Pantene; the parties reached a settlement the following year.‍

He sold his business interests in the early 1980s to devote himself to philanthropy. By 2004, it was reported that Sassoon was no longer associated with the brand that bears his name.‍ He also had a short-lived television series called Your New Day with Vidal Sassoon, which aired in 1980.

Sassoon was twice a guest on BBC Radio 4's Desert Island Discs, on 27 June 1970‍ and 9 October 2011, when he was also Resident Thinker on the Nowhereisland art project.‍ He was a mystery guest on What's My Line? in March 1967.‍

== Honours ==
Sassoon was appointed Commander of the Order of the British Empire (CBE) by Queen Elizabeth II at Buckingham Palace in the 2009 Birthday Honours.‍

== Personal life ==
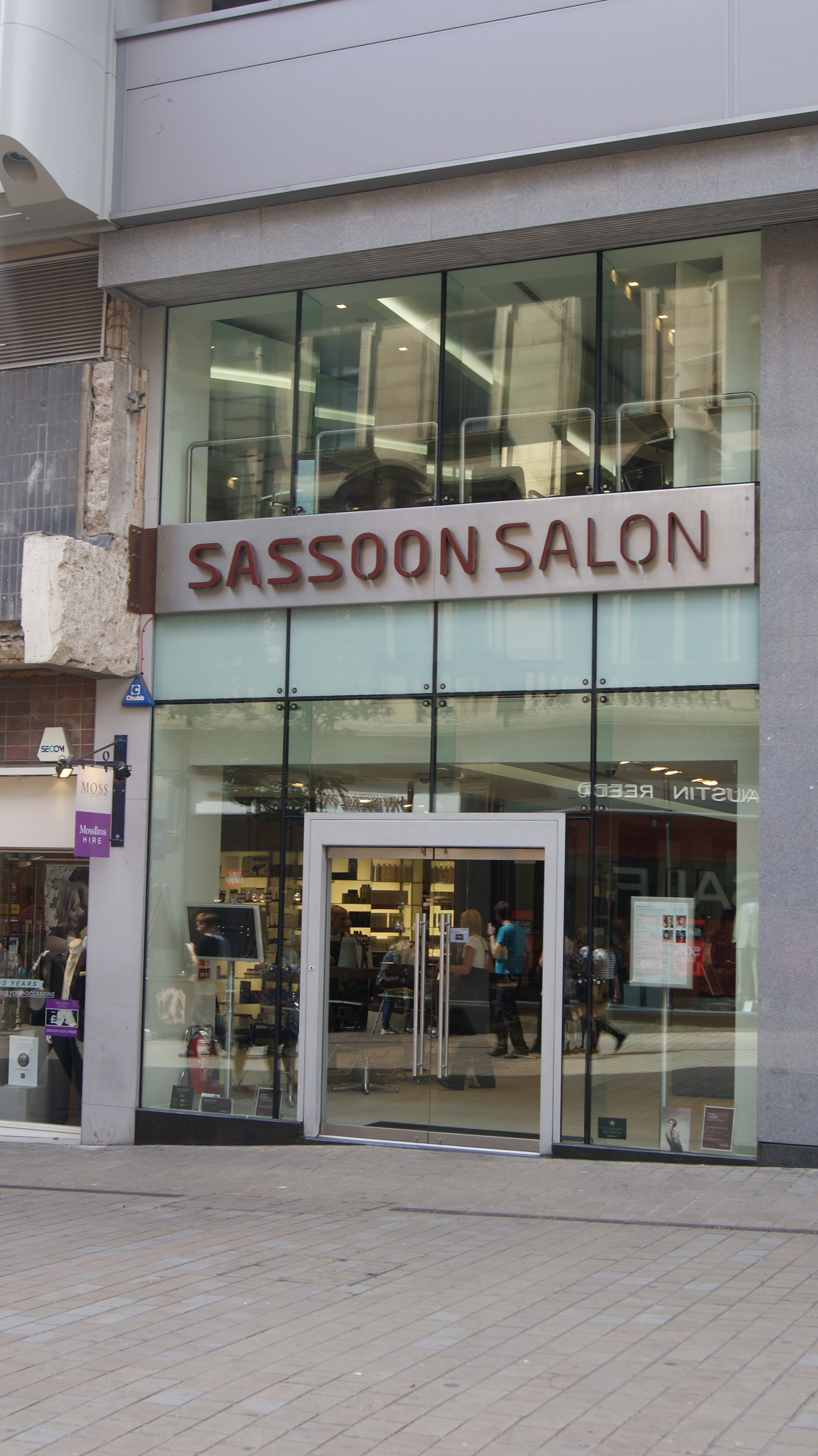
Sassoon Salon, Leeds

Sassoon was married four times, first to Elaine Wood, his salon receptionist, in 1956; the marriage ended in 1958. In 1967, he married actress Beverly Adams, whom he met while filming Torture Garden (1967).‍ They had three biological children, including daughter Catya,‍ and adopted a son.‍‍‍‍‍‍ Sassoon and Adams divorced after 13 years of marriage.‍ His third wife was Jeanette Hartford-Davis, a dressage champion and former fashion model; they married in 1983 and divorced soon after.‍ In 1992, he married designer Rhonda "Ronnie" Sassoon.‍

=== Philanthropy ===
Sassoon had a lifelong commitment to eradicating antisemitism. He started the Vidal Sassoon International Center for the Study of Antisemitism, or SICSA, in 1982.‍ Located at Hebrew University of Jerusalem, it is devoted to gathering information about antisemitism worldwide.

After selling his company, he worked towards philanthropic causes such as the Boys Clubs of America and the Performing Arts Council of the Music Center of Los Angeles via his Vidal Sassoon Foundation.‍ He was also active in supporting relief efforts after Hurricane Katrina. His eponymous foundation also funded educational pursuits on a need-basis in Israel and elsewhere. At the time of his death, he had academies in England, Canada and the United States, while planning to open locations in Germany and Taiwan.

== Illness and death ==
In June 2011, it was reported that Sassoon had been diagnosed with leukemia two years earlier. He died from the disease on 9 May 2012 at his home in Bel Air, Los Angeles,‍ in the presence of his family. A memorial service was planned for a later date.‍

== Legacy ==
"He truly changed the world of hair and beauty. He was definitely the most innovative person ever to enter the industry. He led the way for the celebrity stylists of today."

— Oscar Blandi, celebrity stylist‍

"Vidal was like Christopher Columbus", said Angus Mitchell, who studied under Sassoon. "He discovered that the world was round with his cutting system. It was the first language that people could follow."‍ Neil Cornelius, the incumbent owner of Sassoon's first solo venture, called him a "hairdressing legend".‍

Grace Coddington, Sassoon's former model and creative director of American Vogue, said that he changed the way the public looked at hair:

Before Sassoon, it was all back-combing and lacquer; the whole thing was to make it high and artificial. Suddenly you could put your fingers through your hair! He didn't create [the five-point cut] for me; he created it on me. It was an extraordinary cut; no one has bettered it since. And it liberated everyone. You could just sort of drip-dry it and shake it.

John Barrett of the John Barrett Salon at Bergdorf Goodman said that Sassoon "was the creator of sensual hair. This was somebody who changed our industry entirely, not just from the point of view of cutting hair but actually turning it into a business. He was one of the first who had a product line bought out by a major corporation."‍

=== In popular culture ===
- On the children’s show, Sesame Street, Sassoon was spoofed as Vidal Spittoon, a famous Grouch beautician who is the founder of the "Vidal Spittoon Salon of Grouch Beauty". Oscar the Grouch’s girlfriend, Grundgetta, took classes by Spittoon, to become a Grouch beautician herself.

== Books and films ==
- Sorry I Kept You Waiting, Madam (1968), his autobiography; New York: Putnam.
- Sassoon, Vidal; Sassoon, Beverly (1975). A Year of Beauty and Health. New York: Simon & Schuster. ISBN 0-207-95751-7.
- Cutting Hair the Vidal Sassoon Way (1984)
- Sassoon, Vidal (2010). Vidal: The Autobiography. London: Macmillan. ISBN 978-0-230-74689-3.
- Vidal Sassoon: The Movie – How one man changed the world with a pair of scissors. (2010), a documentary film directed by Craig Teper.

== See also ==
- Vidal Sassoon International Center for the Study of Antisemitism
