= Bloodfist IV: Die Trying =

- DVD cover
- Directed by: Paul Ziller
- Written by: Rob Kerchner; Paul Ziller
- Produced by: Roger Corman
- Starring: Don "The Dragon" Wilson; Cat Sassoon; Jon Agro; Kale Browne; Stephen James Carver; Lenny Citrano; Gary Daniels
- Cinematography: Christian Sebaldt
- Edited by: David Beatty
- Music by: David Wurst; Eric Wurst
- Distributed by: New Horizons Picture Corp.
- Release date: November 18, 1992
- Running time: 86 minutes
- Country: United States
- Language: English

Bloodfist IV: Die Trying is a 1992 American action film directed by Paul Ziller and starring Don "The Dragon" Wilson, Cat Sassoon, Jon Agro, Kale Browne, Gary Daniels, Stephen James Carver, and Lenny Citrano. It was written by Rob Kerchner and Paul Ziller. It was released direct-to-video in 1992. A sequel to Bloodfist III: Forced to Fight (1992), it is the fourth installment in the Bloodfist film series.

== Premise ==
When Danny unknowingly repossesses the car of a powerful arms merchant, it sets off a chain of violent retaliation. After his friends are killed and his daughter is kidnapped, Danny takes matters into his own hands. It does not matter that the CIA and the FBI are also involved; the Dragon's fire is in his fists.This leads to chaos for the merchants.

== Cast ==
- Don "The Dragon" Wilson as Danny Holt
- Catya Sassoon as Lisa (credited as Cat Sasoon)
- Amanda Wyss as Shannon
- Kale Browne as Weiss
- Liz Torres as Lieutenant Garcia
- Dan Martin as Joe
- Gene LeBell as "Burly"
- James Tolkan as Agent Sterling
- Herman Poppe as Agent Hardy
- Stephen James Carver as Detective Stokes
- Gary Daniels as "Scarface"
- John LaMotta as Sal
- Lenny Citrano as Tony
- Dean Katalas as Hector
- Alan Palo as George
- Alexander Folk as Ron, Repo Man
- Robert Noble as Marty
- Heather Lauren Olson as Molly
- David Parker as Ed (credited as David M. Parker
- Mimi Savage as Carla
- George K. Cybulski as Larry (credited as George Cybulsky)
