= Tuff Turf =

1985 teen drama movie

- Original film poster
- Directed by: Fritz Kiersch
- Screenplay by: Jette Rinck
- Story by: Greg Collins O'Neill; Murray Michaels
- Produced by: Donald P. Borchers
- Starring: James Spader; Kim Richards; Paul Mones
- Cinematography: Willy Kurant
- Edited by: Marc Grossman
- Music by: Jonathan Elias
- Production companies: New World Pictures; Planet Productions
- Distributed by: New World Pictures
- Release date: January 11, 1985
- Running time: 112 minutes
- Country: United States
- Language: English
- Box office: $9,369,329

Tuff Turf is a 1985 American drama film directed by Fritz Kiersch and starring James Spader and Kim Richards. The film was released in the United States on January 11, 1985.

Producer Donald Borchers later said the film was a personal favorite of his. "That's Donald P. Borchers on a plate", he said. "That's what happens when I get to make a movie and nobody stands in my way."

== Plot ==
Morgan Hiller (Spader) is an intelligent but bullied teenager from Connecticut. He relocates to Los Angeles, along with his brother and their strict parents, after the family business goes broke. Morgan hits it off with Jimmy Parker (Downey), but struggles to make other friends. Trouble ensues when Morgan pursues bad girl Frankie Croyden (Richards), whose sociopathic and psychotic boyfriend Nick Hauser (Paul Mones) is the leader of the Tuffs, a local gang who already has it in for Morgan after he thwarted their efforts to mug a businessman.

Morgan soon finds pursuing Frankie comes with harsh consequences. Morgan learns some valuable-if-hard lessons, while discovering how far he is prepared to go for Frankie. Ultimately, Morgan must survive a physical showdown with Nick and the Tuffs, to prove himself in Frankie's eyes...and in his own.

== Cast ==
- James Spader as Morgan Hiller
- Kim Richards as Frankie Croyden
- Paul Mones as Nick Hauser
- Matt Clark as Stuart Hiller (Morgan's dad)
- Claudette Nevins as Mrs. Page Hiller (Morgan's mom)
- Robert Downey Jr. as Jimmy Parker (credited as Robert Downey)
- Olivia Barash as Ronnie
- Catya Sassoon as Feather
- Bill Beyers as Brian Hiller (Morgan's brother)
- Gene Pietragallo as Donnie Parker (Jimmy's brother)
- Panchito Gómez as Mickey
- Michael Wyle as Eddie
- Herb Mitchell as Mr. Russell
- Lou Fant as Mr. Croyden (Frankie's dad)
- Donald Fullilove as Howard
- Jered Barclay as Reynolds
- Evonne Kezios as Muffy
- Cheryl Ann Clark as Patty
- Matt Gavin as Alan
- Chad McCann as Troy
- Vivian Brown as History teacher
- Ceil Cabot as Secretary
- Donna Fuller as Nurse
- Rosa Sabina Rodriguez as Nurse in elevator
- Francis X. McCarthy as Man at bus stop
- Art Evans as Security guard
- Jeffrey Dawson as Security guard #2

== Production ==
The film was produced by Donald Borchers who had made several films for New World including Children of the Corn and Angel. Borchers was inspired to make the film after seeing an R and B concert where one of the songs was "She's So Tough". This led to the title Tuff Turf.

Borchers claims that shortly before filming began head of production Robert Rehme wanted to cease production because of the financial failure of Streets of Fire - which Rehme had greenlit at Universal. However Borchers appealed to the owners of fhe studio and filming proceeded. Borchers also claimed Rehme wanted to change the title to Rules Don't Apply.

The screenwriter was "Jette Rinck", the legally adopted name of Ina May (taken from the James Dean character in Giant). She wrote the screenplay in 3.5 weeks; the film was shot over a four-week period in Reseda.

The female lead was originally offered to Madonna at the suggestion of New World executive Jonathan Axelrod. However Borchers found out that Madonna wanted to make Desperately Seeking Susan so instead he offered the role to Kim Richards who the producer thought "was the sexiest 19 year old on the planet" although "if I had known about the cocaine problems I probably wouldn't have cast her." Richards agreed to appear nude in a scene but after filming her management requested the scene be removed from the final movie.

The role of Spader's best friend was offered to Crispin Glover but he was making another movie so Robert Downey Jr was cast instead. Downey, Richards and fellow cast member Catya Sassoon all had notable drug problems.

The dance sequence was choreographed by Robert Banas.

== Soundtrack ==
- "Tuff Turf" - Southside Johnny
- "People Who Died" - the Jim Carroll Band
- "Green Onions" - Jack Mack and the Heart Attack
- "Voices" - The Jim Carroll Band
- "So Tuff" - Jack Mack and the Heart Attack
- "Breakin' the Rules (What Do You Do When Opposites Attract)" - Lene Lovich
- "Love Hates" - Marianne Faithfull
- "It's Too Late" - The Jim Carroll Band
- "She's Looking Good" - Jack Mack and the Heart Attack
- "Twist and Shout" - Dale Gonyea with J.R. & the Z-Men
- "We Walk the Night" - Paul Carney and Michael Chamberlain dubbed singing voices for James Spader
- "Breakin' the Rules" - Jonathan Elias (1985 VHS/Beta/Laser Disc Home Video Versions only)

Liner notes from 1985 LP:
Mastered At– Precision Lacquer, Hollywood CA
Coordinator– Harold Bronson
Design– Grace Amemiya
Mastered By– Stephen Marcussen
