= David Shofet =

Iranian-American rabbi

- Born: 1939 (age 86–87); Tehran, Iran
- Occupation: Rabbi
- Parent(s): Yedidia Shofet; Rabbanit Heshmat Shofet

David Shofet is an Iranian American rabbi. He is the founder and chief rabbi of the Nessah Synagogue in Beverly Hills, California.

== Early life ==
Shofet was born in 1939 in Tehran, Iran. David comes from a family who have been rabbis for twelve generations. He is a Sephardi Jew. His father, Yedidia Shofet, served as the Chief Rabbi of Iran from 1922 to 1980. His mother is Rabbanit Heshmat Shofet.

Shortly after the Iranian Revolution of 1979, Shofet emigrated to the United States.

== Career ==
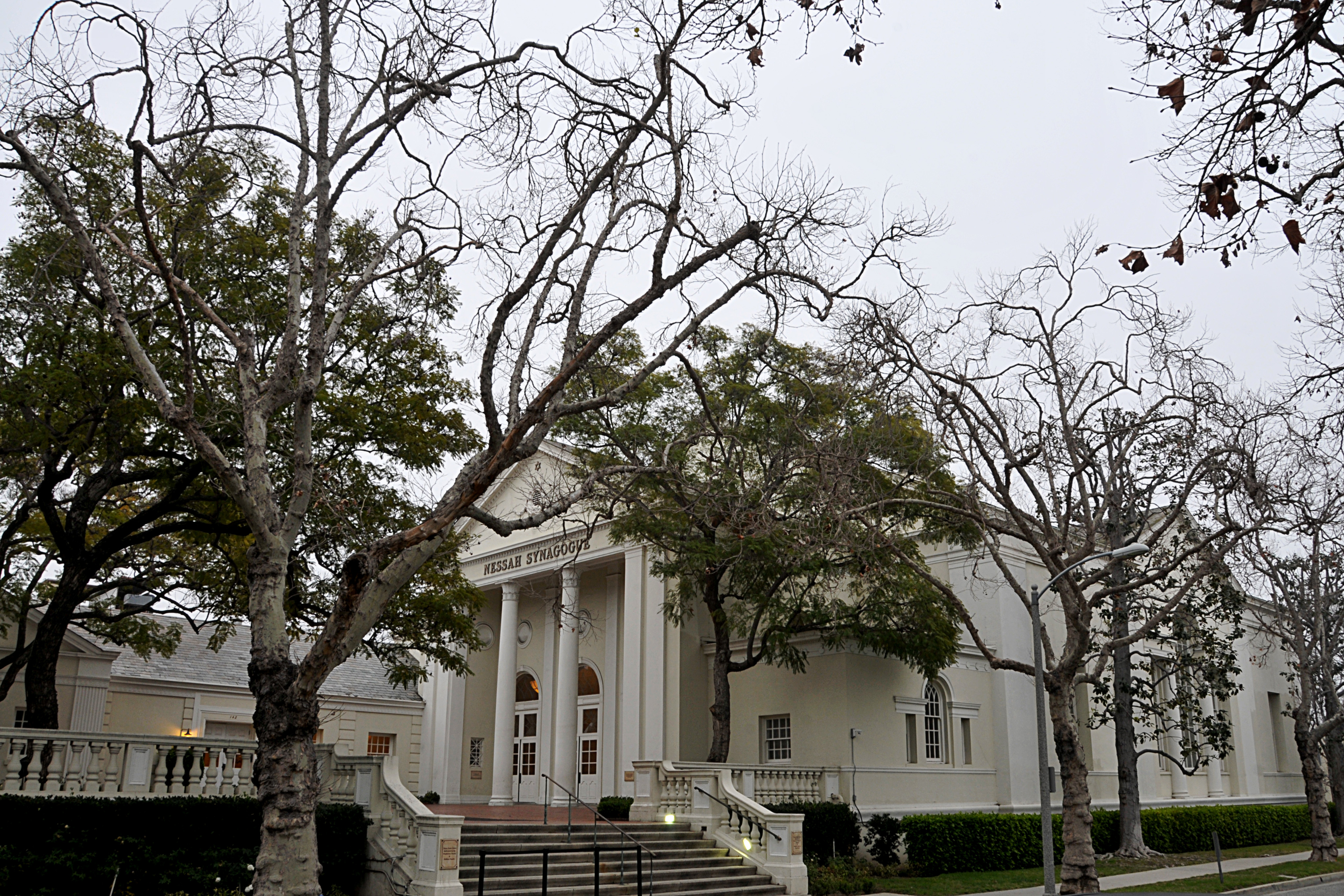
The Nessah Synagogue, founded by Rabbi David Shofet.

Shofet founded the Nessah Synagogue in 1980. They first met at the Beth Jacob Congregation. Since 2002, the synagogue has been based on South Rexford Drive in Beverly Hills, California. Shofet still serves as its chief rabbi.

Shortly after his father's death, Persian-Jewish leaders signed a resolution to recognize him as the primary religious leader of their community.
