= Catya Sassoon =

American model and actress (1967–2002)

- Born: September 3, 1968; New York City, U.S.
- Died: January 1, 2002 (aged 33); Hollywood, Los Angeles, California, U.S.
- Resting place: Eden Memorial Park Cemetery
- Other names: Cat Sasoon; Cat Sassoon
- Occupations: Model; actress
- Years active: 1982–1995
- Spouses: Luca Scalisi (m. 1984; div. 1985) Joe Meyers (before 2002)
- Children: 3
- Parents: Vidal Sassoon (father); Beverly Adams (mother)
- Relatives: Eden Sassoon (sister)
- Modeling information
- Height: 5 ft 8 in (1.73 m)
- Hair color: Auburn
- Eye color: Brown
- Agency: Prestige

Catya "Cat" Sassoon (September 3, 1968 – January 1, 2002) was an American actress, singer and model. She was the eldest daughter of Vidal Sassoon and Beverly Adams.

== Early life ==
The eldest of four children, Sassoon was born at the Klingenstein Pavilion of Mount Sinai Hospital in New York City to British hairstylist Vidal Sassoon, and his wife, Canadian-born actress Beverly Adams. She had three younger siblings: sister Eden and two brothers. Her father was born in Shepherd's Bush and was of Greek and Jewish descent. Sassoon's parents divorced in 1980.

Raised in Beverly Hills, Sassoon began modeling as a child with her mother Beverly and appeared on several talk shows. By the age of 13, Sassoon began rebelling and piercing her nose and styled her hair in a purple-and-white mohawk.

== Career ==
Against her parents' wishes, Sassoon dropped out of Beverly Hills High School at the age of 14 to pursue a modeling career. She moved to New York City where she signed with the Prestige Agency and enrolled at Professional Children's School. Her modeling career quickly took off and she became one of New York's top teen models. Sassoon later appeared on the covers of Seventeen, Brides and Cosmopolitan. It was around this time that Sassoon began taking drugs. In his autobiography, Vidal Sasson recalled that he realized his daughter was having drug issues when the two appeared on a morning talk show and Sassoon appeared to be high. Vidal Sassoon demanded that Catya return to Los Angeles where she was admitted to the Betty Ford Center. It would be the first of several rehab stays. After a month, Sassoon was released and resumed her career.

Shortly before she was set to leave for a lucrative modeling assignment in Japan, Sassoon met 18-year old Luca Scalisi, the son of an Italian film producer. Scalisi proposed to the then 15-year old Sassoon at a Los Angeles dinner party her father was attending. Vidal Sassoon consented to marriage on the condition that the two be married in a Jewish ceremony at his home. The two were married at Vidal's home in August 1984. Shortly after the wedding, Sassoon landed her first film role. She made her film debut in the role of "Feather", a "somewhat trashy teen-ager" in the 1985 drama, Tuff Turf. Sassoon's marriage to Luca Scalisi ended shortly after the release of Tuff Turf. By age 21, Sassoon was battling a serious addiction to drugs and eventually entered a drug rehabilitation facility. Sassoon later revealed in an interview with Joan Rivers that she had suffered a drug induced heart attack while undergoing treatment for her addiction.

By 1990, Sassoon was sober again and began traveling around the country with her mother to promote the latter's romance novel, Fantasies. Both women openly discussed how they overcame addiction problems. Beverly Sassoon spoke about her addiction to alcohol and stated that she was three years sober. Catya, then 22, was about to celebrate one year of sobriety. Later that year, Sassoon began acting again and appeared in an episode of Hardball. She also appeared in Bloodfist IV: Die Trying, Secret Games and Dance with Death. In 1993, Sassoon landed the lead role in the Roger Corman-produced martial arts film Angelfist, directed by Cirio H. Santiago. Sassoon made her last screen appearance in the 1995 action film, Bloodfist VI: Ground Zero. In addition to acting, Sassoon was also the lead singer of an all female group, Feline Force.

== Personal life ==
While shooting a film in South Africa around 1994, Sassoon met a Zimbabwean musician. The two were married shortly thereafter and moved to Zimbabwe. Around 1995, the couple had a son. Sassoon's second marriage also ended in divorce. She married for the third time to screenwriter and waiter Joe Meyers. In the spring of 2000, she gave birth to twin girls.

== Death ==
On December 31, 2001, Sassoon and her husband attended a New Year's Eve party at the Los Angeles home of socialites Mary and Gregory Sabatani. According to the Los Angeles Police Department, Sassoon was found dead of a suspected drug overdose at the Sabatani home around 9:00 the following morning. However, Sassoon's manager Hilly Elkins stated that Sassoon and her husband had left the party the night before after she complained of feeling ill. Elkins states that Meyers found Sassoon dead in their bed on New Year's Day morning. Elkins and the Sassoon family believed Sassoon, who had a history of high blood pressure, died of a heart attack. Her family also maintained that she had not consumed any drugs and was clean and sober at the time of her death. Sassoon's funeral was held on January 4, after which she was buried next to her grandmother at Eden Memorial Park Cemetery in Mission Hills, California.

The Los Angeles County coroner later determined that while Sassoon did suffer from cardiovascular disease and she did suffer a heart attack, the heart attack was induced by an accidental overdose of the opioid pain-killer hydromorphone. Cocaine was also found in her system.

== Filmography ==
Year	Title	Role	Notes
1985	Tuff Turf	Feather	
1987	Inside Out		
1990	Hardball	Shauna	Episode: "Sex, Cops, and Videotape"
1990	The Fanelli Boys	Valentina	Episode: "Poetic Justice"
1991	Out of This World	Velma	Episode: "Heck's Angels"
1992	Dance with Death	Jodie	
1992	Secret Games	Sandra	
1992	Bloodfist IV: Die Trying	Lisa	Alternative title: Die Trying; Credited as Cat Sassoon
1992	Inside Out IV	Pauline	Segment: "Natalie Would"
1993	Angelfist	Katara "Kat" Lang	
1994	Hollywood Women	Herself	Miniseries
1995	Bloodfist VI: Ground Zero	Tori	Alternative titles: Assault at Ground Zero; Ground Zero; Credited as Cat Sassoon
