= Cal Neva Lodge & Casino =

Resort on the California–Nevada border

Cal Neva Resort & Casino
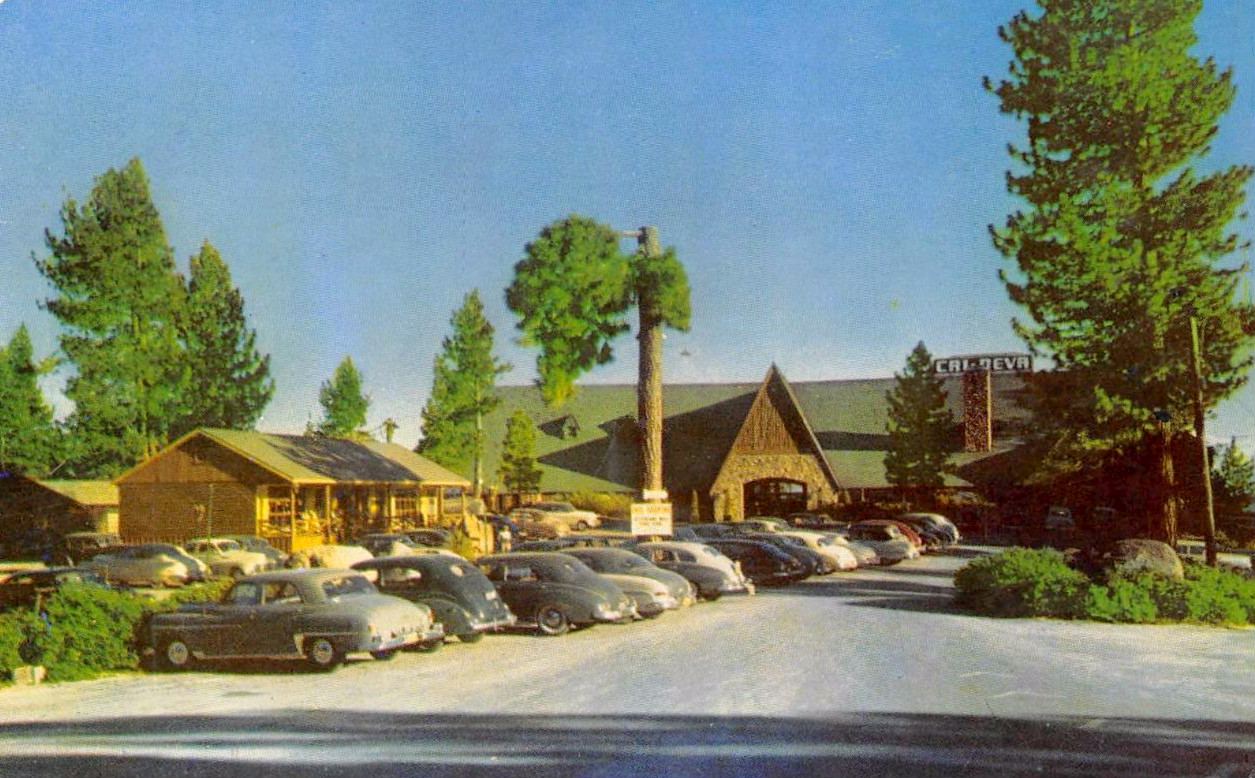
- The Cal-Neva Lodge & Casino in 1962

- Cal Neva Lodge & Casino Cal Neva Lodge & Casino (the United States)
- Interactive map of Cal Neva Resort & Casino
- Location: Crystal Bay, Nevada; 2 Stateline Road, Crystal Bay, Nevada, United States; 39°13′29″N 120°0′20″W
- Opened: 1926; 100 years ago
- No. of rooms: 220
- Gaming space: 116,000 sq ft (10,800 m^{2})
- Casino type: Land-based

Cal Neva Resort & Casino, previously known as the Calneva Resort and Cal-Neva Lodge, was a resort and casino in Crystal Bay, Nevada and Kings Beach, California, straddling the border between Nevada and California on the shores of Lake Tahoe. The original building was constructed in 1926 and became famous when the national media picked up a story about actress Clara Bow canceling checks she owed to the Cal-Neva worth $13,000 in 1930 ($250,500 today). After burning down in a fire in 1937, the structure was rebuilt in 30 days. In 1960, entertainer Frank Sinatra purchased the resort with several others, including singer Dean Martin and Chicago mobster Sam Giancana.

Under Sinatra, the Celebrity Room was added alongside a helipad and the property remained open year-round. Sinatra's ownership gradually increased over the following two years until he owned 50%. Giancana's attendance at the property first provoked a rift between Sinatra and shareholder Hank Sanicola, and later resulted in Sinatra's gambling license being suspended by the Nevada Gaming Control Board. Sinatra initially leased the property to Jack L. Warner and later in 1968 to a group of investors. It passed through the hands of a series of investment groups until 1976 when it was bought by Kirk Kerkorian. The property closed for renovations in 2013 and has not reopened since. Larry Ellison purchased the property out of bankruptcy in 2018; in 2023 it was sold to McWhinney, a real estate company in Denver, who announced plans to convert it into a hotel.

== History ==
=== Early period ===
The Cal-Neva Lodge was built in 1926 by real estate developer Robert P. Sherman. Canadian Army Colonel H. H. Betts went missing from his room at the Cal-Neva in 1929; his body was found over a year later some five miles away from the hotel. The lodge was first made nationally famous in late 1930 when actress Clara Bow canceled checks owed to the casino worth $13,000. She claimed that she had believed that the chips she was using while playing blackjack were worth 50 cents when they were actually valued at $100. In 1931, Nevada Governor Fred B. Balzar signed Assembly Bill 98, which legalized gambling in Nevada. After being purchased by developer Norman Blitz, it became one of Nevada's earliest legalized casinos. Rumors abounded that the owners of the lodge intended to put a gambling boat on the lake. A group of investors bought the Cal-Neva in 1935, and recruited William "Bones" Remmer to act as its president and the pit manager of the casino. That year a 13-year-old Judy Garland performed at Cal-Neva for the first time. The original building burned down in 1937, causing $200,000 ($4,479,200 today) worth of damage; the incident was thought to have been arson but no charges were ever brought. The reconstruction effort took 30 days, with 500 men working on the project.

Towards the end of World War II, the lodge was purchased from Remmer by Sanford Adler and a group of associates for $700,000; ($9,380,200 today) Adler renamed the property Cal Neva — dropping the hyphen — to match his Cal Neva hotel in Reno, Nevada. However, this spelling of the name had been in common use since before the fire. Xavier Cugat was paid a reported $22,000 for a two-week stint at Cal Neva Lodge in 1946, reportedly the first time a nationally famous band performed there. Ownership was transferred once again on March 21, 1955, when a group led by Bert "Wingy" Grober purchased the lodge for $1 million. During this period, the hotel was frequented by members of the Kennedy family including John F. and his brother Robert. Author Scott Lankford claims that JFK used the lodge to carry on an "endless series of extramarital affairs with wealthy divorcees and Tahoe's notoriously ubiquitous prostitutes". The lodge served as accommodation during the 1960 Winter Olympics, held at nearby Squaw Valley Ski Resort. It has remained popular with skiers over the decades since.

=== Ownership by Frank Sinatra ===
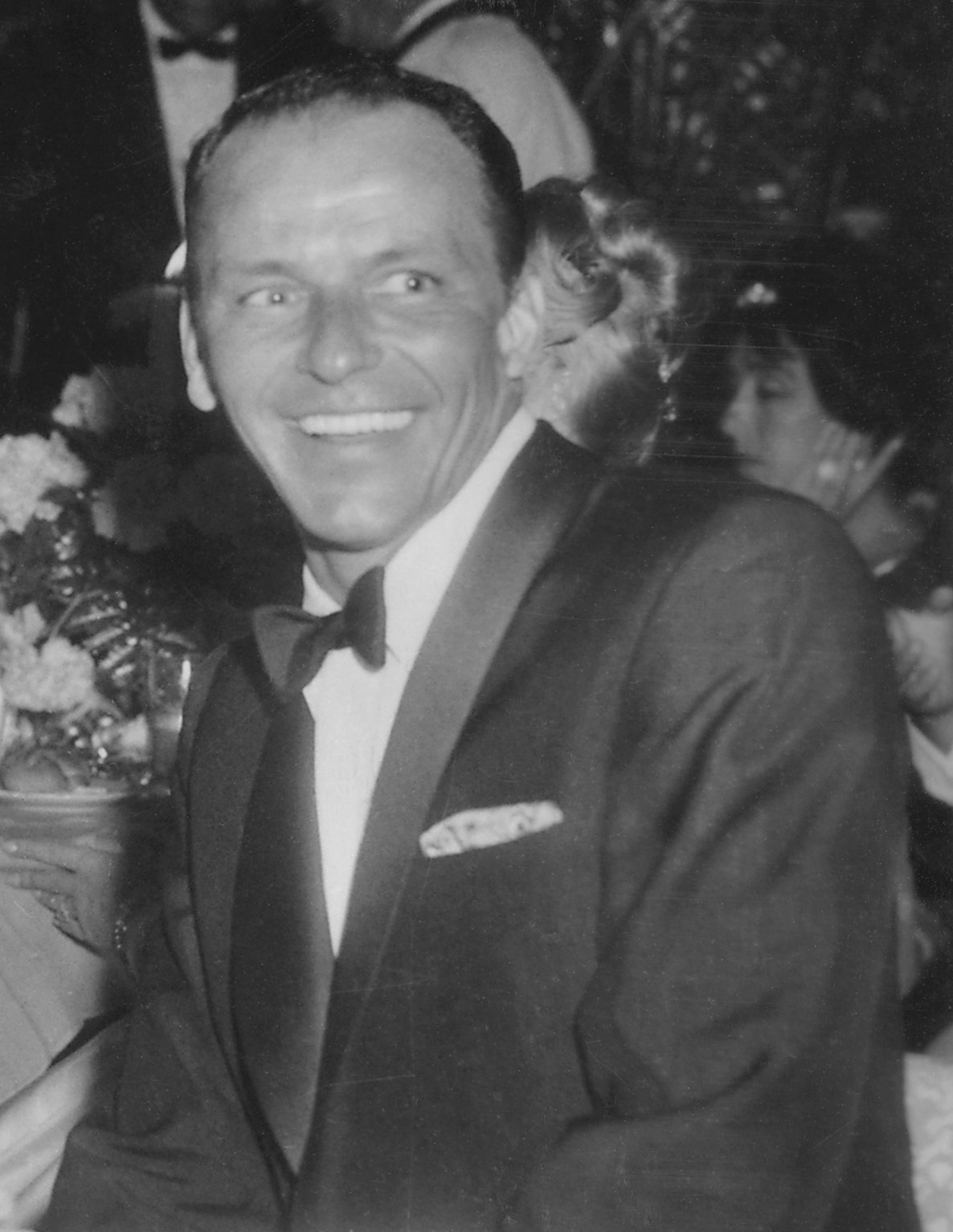
Frank Sinatra became the majority stakeholder in the Cal Neva Lodge in 1960

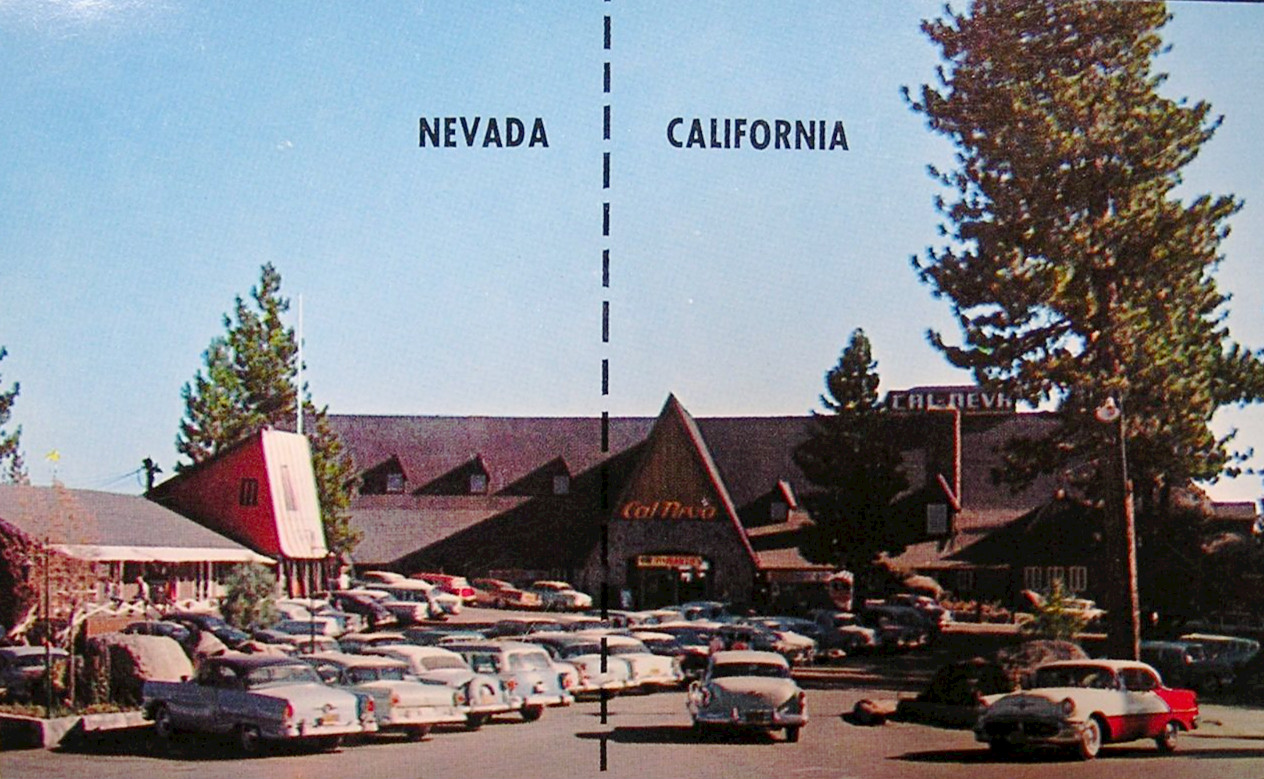
Postcard of the lodge, probably early 1960s

Frank Sinatra first visited Cal Neva in 1951; his trip made the national press as he overdosed on sleeping pills and this was reported to the local sheriff. Sinatra continued to frequent the lodge; on one occasion, he played a jam session with big band leader Harry James and actress and singer Betty Grable. Sinatra publicly bought the resort in 1960 through his company, Park Lake Enterprises. Initially, he owned 25 percent of the property with Hank Sanicola and Paul "Skinny" D'Amato who each held 13 percent. Other smaller shareholders included Dean Martin. Chicago mobster Sam Giancana was said to be a silent partner in the business; D'Amato acted as Giancana's man. Sinatra gradually expanded his ownership of the casino; by 1962 he owned more than 50 percent share, with Sanicola holding 33 percent and Sanford Waterman owning the remaining shares.

The shareholders decided to open the property year-round; it had only previously opened for the summer season. Sinatra built the Celebrity Room theater and installed a helicopter pad on the roof. He re-utilized Prohibition-era smuggling tunnels beneath the property to allow mob members to move around the property without being seen by the public. One led from near the main building to his private chalet overlooking Lake Tahoe.

The FBI already had the lodge under investigation at the time due to the connection to Joseph P. Kennedy Sr., who was staying there at the time that Sinatra's deal was finalized. There were concerns that Kennedy was involved in the arrangement of a casino for use by the American Mafia. The FBI suspected that the expansion was made using funds borrowed from Jimmy Hoffa. Following a request by Robert F. Kennedy, who had concerns over the press coverage of his and his brother's relationships with Marilyn Monroe, Sinatra made accommodation available for her for a weekend before her death on August 4, 1962. During this period she was not allowed to leave and only Giancana was allowed to visit her. Even her former husband, Joe DiMaggio, was turned away. She attempted suicide through a pill overdose, but she contacted the reception desk, and was rushed to the hospital where she had her stomach pumped. This cabin, known as Monroe's, was still part of the guest accommodations, as was another known as Sinatra's, up until the closure of the resort. Also that year, a federal investigation took place into a prostitution ring being run from the foyer of the Cal Neva.

The Sinatra period saw extravagant parties and visits by celebrities such as Judy Garland, Liza Minnelli, Kim Novak, Shirley MacLaine, Sammy Davis Jr., Dean Martin, Lena Horne, Tony Curtis, Janet Leigh, Lucille Ball, Desi Arnaz and Richard Crenna. However, Sinatra's mood swings would sometimes determine how he responded to patrons and friends. Journalist Herb Caen reported that he could be dismissive and insulting to those who annoyed him. Sam Giancana was banned from the casinos in the state of Nevada, but Sinatra continued to allow him to stay at the Cal Neva lodge which resulted in Hank Sanicola seeking to remove himself as a shareholder. Although Sinatra sought to explain that Giancana was only visiting his girlfriend, Phyllis McGuire, the disagreement resulted in the end of Sinatra and Sanicola's friendship. After Giancana was spotted on the premises, Sinatra had his gambling license suspended by the Nevada Gaming Control Board. (Note: Sinatra then berated the Nevada Gaming Control Board in a profanity-filled tirade that hurt his chances to retain his casino license. Sinatra did not gain back his gambling license until 1981, following a hearing of the Nevada Gaming Commission and the intervention of Ronald Reagan, who acted as a character witness.) Following this, Sinatra decided he wanted to get out of entertainment property ownership as he was being heavily criticized in the national press and pursued by law enforcement over illegal activities at the casino. The Cal Neva Lodge was leased to Jack L. Warner in a deal which also saw a majority stake in Reprise Records sold to Warner Bros. Records and Sinatra gaining a one-third ownership in the new company.

=== Later period ===
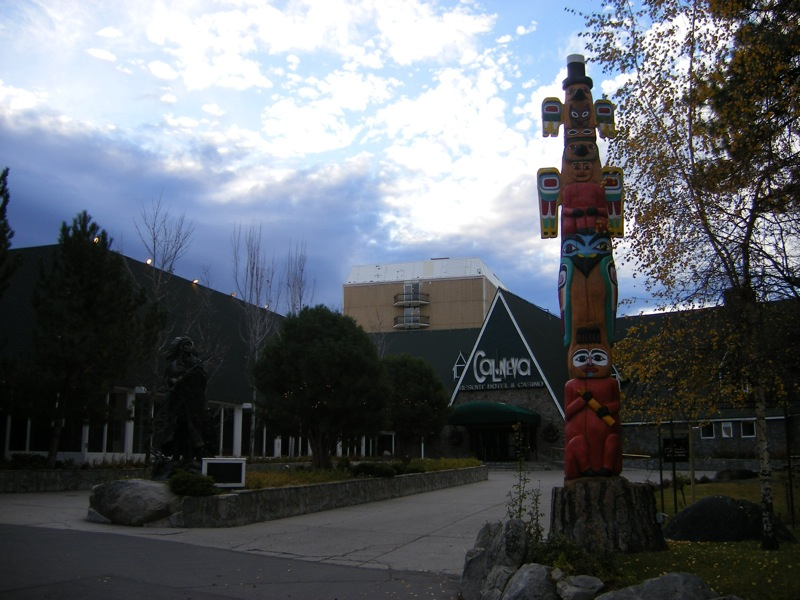
The Cal Neva Resort in 2007

After leasing it to Warner for four years, Sinatra sought to sell the property to Howard Hughes in 1967 as part of the renewal of his contract at the Sands Hotel and Casino. Following a fallout between Hughes and Sinatra, the entertainer instead signed a contract with Caesars Palace. This included a requirement for Sinatra's stake in Cal Neva to be purchased by his new employer for $2 million, but instead the lodge passed into the hands of the same owners as Reno's Club Cal Neva in 1968 for $1.4 million.

The new owners oversaw the construction of a ten-story expansion to the property. This added 200 rooms to the lodge, for which permission was given although the Nevada State Park Advisory Committee opposed the move. They sought to re-open the Cal Neva on July 1, 1969, but instead it partly opened in May of that year with the new expansion opening the following month. The Ohio Real Estate Investment Trust purchased the lodge in 1970 for $6 million, with the aim to lease it to the U.S. Capital Corporation, who in turn sought to sublease it to Tahoe Crystal Bay Inc. The stockholders of the Ohio Real Estate Investment Trust filed a lawsuit against the company in 1973, which resulted in the Cal Neva being placed into federal receivership. After opening year-round since Sinatra purchased the lodge, it closed for the winter season in 1974 due to a drop in visitors blamed on the 1973 oil crisis.

The Cal Neva was sold in 1975 alongside the Crystal Bay Club to BKJ Corporation, which consisted of Everett Brunzell, Charles Ketchum, and Norman Jenson. The two clubs were purchased for a total of $9 million. However, their licensing application for Cal Neva was turned down by the Nevada Gaming Commission due to their lack of ongoing finances. The First National Bank of Nevada foreclosed on the property in early 1976 before selling it to Kirk Kerkorian, a significant shareholder in Metro-Goldwyn-Mayer. He owned the Cal Neva through his Tracinda Investment Corporation, a different entity than the one through which he owns his MGM shares. As part of the re-launch of the lodge, he convinced Dean Martin to return for a performance, for which Cary Grant was also in attendance.

Jon Perroton was arrested in 1985 for fraud after convincing Hibernia National Bank to loan him $23 million towards the purchase price of Cal Neva. He had claimed that he had the backing of Sheraton Hotels and Resorts. He was subsequently sentenced to 20 years in custody. That same year, the lodge was purchased by real estate developer Chuck Bluth. Under Bluth, the building was renovated and the exterior of the main building was restored to how it looked in the 1960s. On September 10–12, 1993, the lodge hosted the second annual Daow Aga Pow wow (a local Native American meeting) on Lake Tahoe. The hotel was named "Nevada's Best Getaway" in 1998 and cited as one of America's 50 Flagship Hotels.

=== Closure and renovations ===
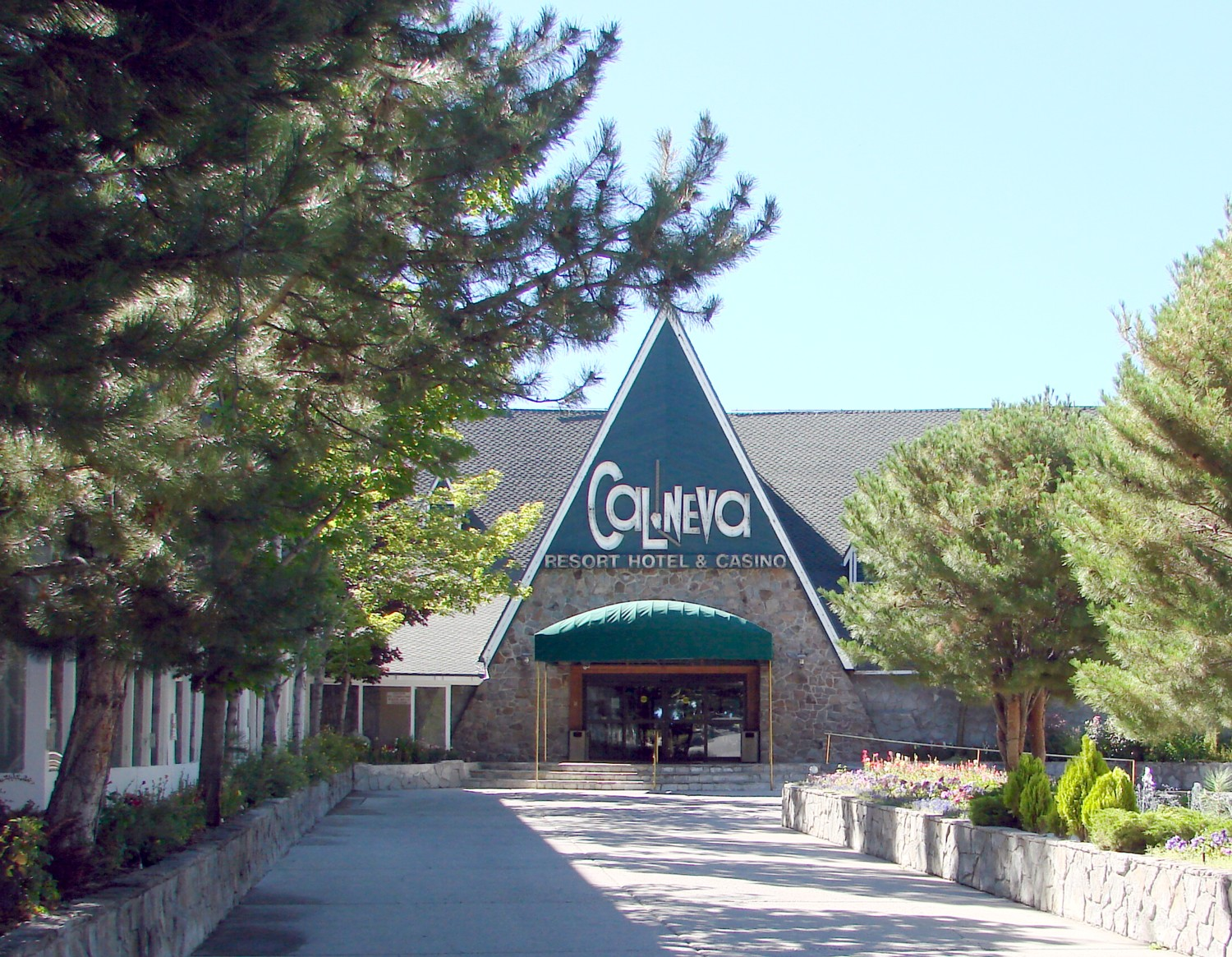
Hotel facade in 2010

Bluth sold the lodge to Ezri Namvar in 2005. However, the casino was in severe decline; by 2009 the revenue was around half of that received in 1992. Canyon Capital Advisors foreclosed on a $25 million loan, and an auction open across two states failed to generate any bidders. The property finally ceased operations on 31 March 2010. Several other casinos in the Lake Tahoe area closed around the same time.

Criswell-Radovan, LLC, a Napa, California-based development company, purchased the property in the spring of 2013, intending to complete an extensive renovation of the property. The development project was originally estimated to take at least a year and was to include overhauls of the interior guest rooms, the Circle Bar, the casino, Frank Sinatra's Celebrity Room theater, and a complete upgrade of the exterior. The casino upgrade sought to restore the original 6,000-square-foot gaming floor, complete with a full slot machine display and the return of table games. The project was initially planned to be completed by December 2014, but reopening was repeatedly delayed due to difficulties with construction and financing. The company obtained a $29 million loan in November 2014 that allowed construction to begin. An additional $20 million equity line of credit was also financing the project.

Criswell-Radovan filed for bankruptcy protection in July 2016, and the property was put up for auction. Billionaire Larry Ellison was the sole bidder, purchasing the property for $35.8 million in January 2018. In April 2023 the property was bought by McWhinney, a real estate company in Denver, who announced plans to convert it into a luxury hotel.

== Architecture and location ==
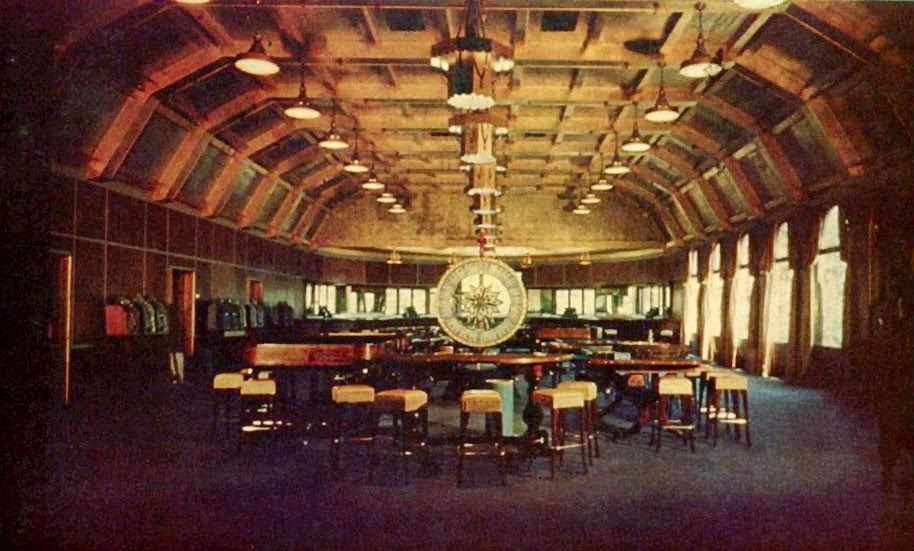
The casino

The Cal Neva Lodge and Casino overlooks Lake Tahoe with the property split across the California–Nevada border near Crystal Bay. The main dining room has a white line indicating the state border running down the middle of the room. The swimming pool also straddles the state border. The interior is decorated in the lodge-style. The entrance has been replaced several times over the years, although the exterior of the buildings has remained almost the same since the reconstruction. Before the expansion under Sinatra, the lodge had 55 rooms and 11 lodges, but this was increased to 220 rooms following the expansion in 1969. As of 1998, it had 182 rooms and suites and eight conference rooms, catering for up to 400 people.

=== Celebrity and Indian rooms ===
Constructed after the purchase by Sinatra and his associates, the Celebrity Room and theater hosted Sinatra and his Rat Pack friends, as well as other musicians of the day. It is located near the casino area on the Nevada side of the property, with a capacity for up to 700 people. The Indian room featured Native American memorabilia and wood-beamed ceilings, and is sited in the California side of the property. It functioned as both a museum to the nearby Washoe people, as well as a ballroom. The Indian room underwent renovation in the late 1980s, when it was described by Skiing magazine as being "a spacious area with a large fireplace".

== In popular culture ==
The infrastructure of the resort was copied as a base template for the setting of the 2018 film Bad Times at the El Royale.
