= Blandi =

Blandi is a surname. Notable people with the surname include:

- Nicolás Blandi (born 1990), Argentine footballer
- Oscar Blandi, Italian celebrity hair stylist
