= Nessah Synagogue =

Sephardic synagogue in Beverly Hills, U.S.

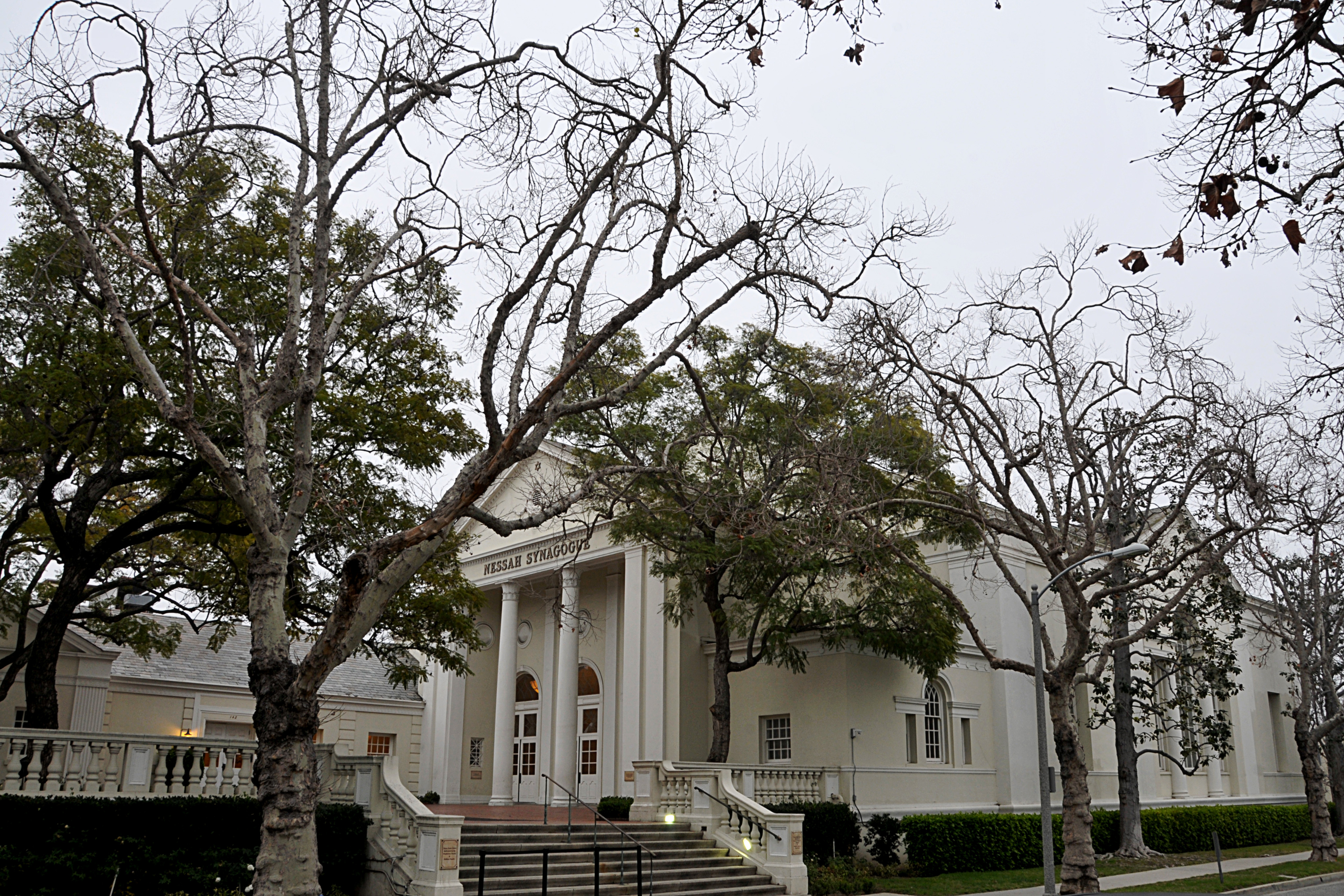

Religion
- Affiliation: Judaism

Location
- Location: 142 South Rexford Drive, Beverly Hills, California
- Interactive map of Nessah Synagogue
- Coordinates: 34.06568°N 118.39375°W

Architecture
- Style: Greek Revival
- Founder: Rabbi David Shofet
- Completed: 2002

Website
- Website

The Nessah Synagogue is a Sephardic synagogue in Beverly Hills, California.

== History ==
The synagogue was established in 1980 for the immigration of Persian Jews to Los Angeles County, shortly after the Iranian Revolution of 1979. It was founded by Rabbi David Shofet. His father, Yedidia Shofet (1908-2005), had served as the Chief Rabbi of Iran from 1922 to 1980.

Persian Jews from the congregation initially worshipped at Beth Jacob Congregation, a long-established Orthodox synagogue in Beverly Hills. Later, they met at the Saban Theatre, also in Beverly Hills. Later, they moved into a building in Santa Monica, California. The congregation moved into its current building (the former home of the First Church of Christ, Scientist that now resides across the street) in 2002. The building's remodeling was supervised by architect Hamid Gabbay. It includes "Simcha Hall", a ballroom used for weddings, Bar/Bat Mitzvah, Brit milah, fundraising events, etc.

It acts as a large religious, educational and cultural center, where Hebrew and Iranian Jewish history is taught. It organizes three weekly Torah classes, daily prayer services, lectures, and three Shabbat services. A 2011 profile of Nessah Synagogue in Tablet Magazine found that the congregation serves an important function as a "community center" for the Persian Jews of Los Angeles and as a bridge between traditions rooted in Iran and the mainstream American lifestyle most of them now lead, and also noted that many members maintain affiliation both with Nessah and with another congregation with a more mixed membership, such as Sinai Temple or Stephen S. Wise Temple.

Inside the synagogue, the Torah ark is a replica of the one in the Portuguese Synagogue in Amsterdam.

In the early mornings hours of Saturday, December 14, 2019, an individual broke in and vandalized the synagogue, damaging a number of Torah scrolls, but the Torah scrolls for ritual use had been locked up and were not damaged.
