= Eden Memorial Park Cemetery =

Jewish cemetery in Los Angeles, California

Coordinates: 34°16′50″N 118°28′07″W

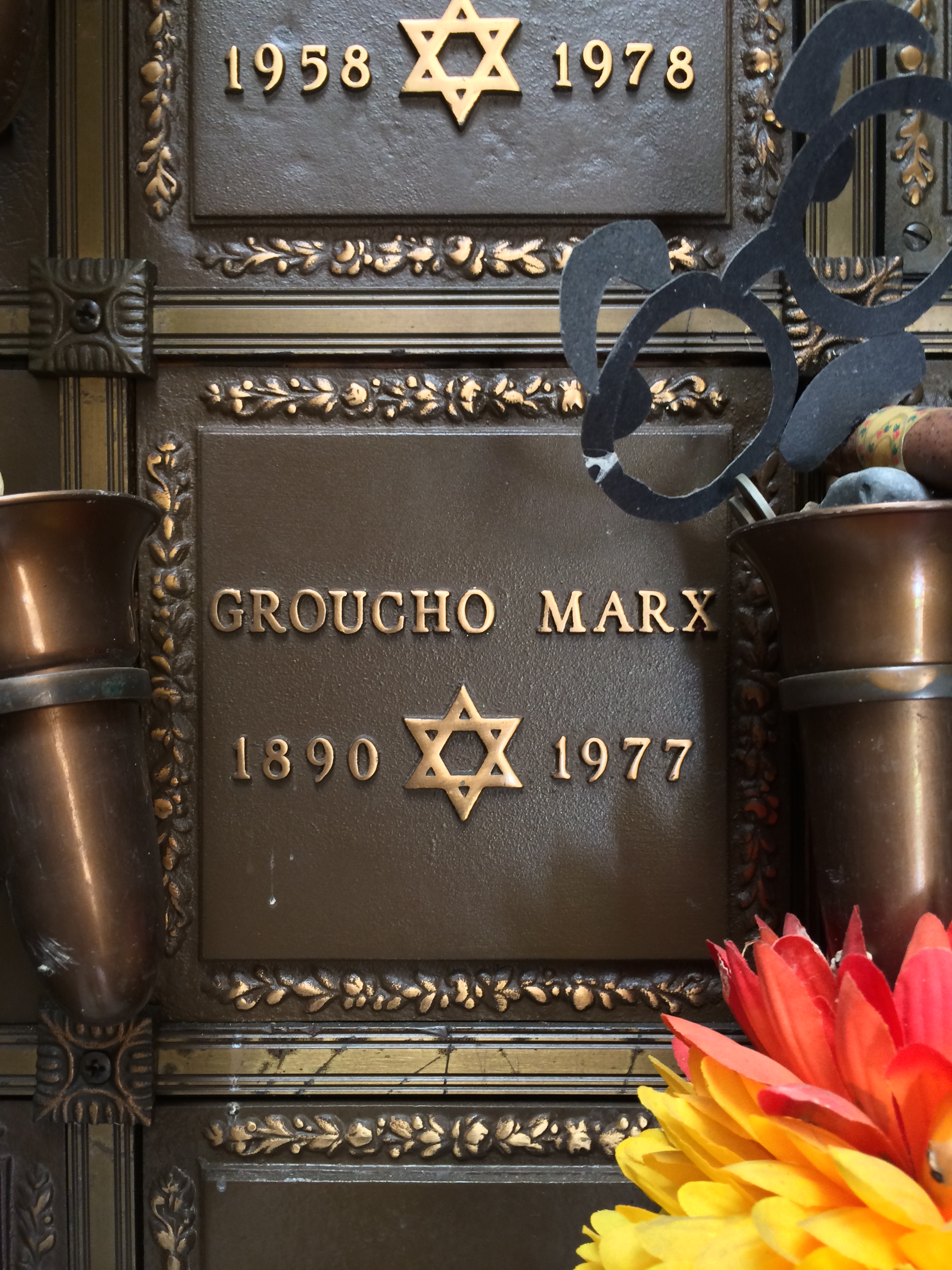
- One of the most famous niches at Eden Memorial Park, that of Groucho Marx
- Interactive map of Eden Memorial Park Cemetery

Details
- Location: 11500 Sepulveda Boulevard, Mission Hills, California
- Country: United States
- Type: Jewish cemetery
- Find a Grave: Eden Memorial Park Cemetery

Eden Memorial Park Cemetery is a Jewish cemetery located at 11500 Sepulveda Boulevard, Mission Hills, California, in the San Fernando Valley of Los Angeles. Many Jews from the entertainment industry are buried here. It is located north of the San Fernando Mission Cemetery. It is currently owned by Service Corporation International.

The operators of the cemetery were accused on more than one occasion of destroying graves and discarding human remains to make room for new burials.

== Notable interments ==
- Phil Arnold (1909–1968), actor
- Marty Allen (1922–2018), actor, comedian
- Terry Becker (1921–2014), actor
- John Brown (1904–1957), actor
- Lenny Bruce (1925–1966), comedian
- James Caan (1940–2022), actor
- Howard Caine (1926–1993), actor
- Jon Cedar (1931–2011), actor
- Harvey Cohen (1951–2007), composer
- Allen Curtis (1878–1961), film director
- Dan Curtis (1927–2006), film producer and director
- Lewis Dauber (1949–2019), actor
- Sam Denoff (1928–2011), screenwriter
- Don Diamond (1921–2011), actor
- Phil Foster (1914–1985), actor
- Bruce Gary (1951–2006), musician
- Michael Gilden (1962–2006), actor
- Bert Gordon (1895–1974), comedian
- Robert Gordon (1913–1990), actor
- Mitzi Green (1920–1969), actress
- Morton Heilig (1926–1997), cinematographer, inventor
- Jerry Heller (1940–2016), American music manager
- Jack Herer (1939–2010), cannabis activist
- Sam Jaffe (1891–1984), actor
- Milt Kamen (1921–1977), actor, comic
- Herb Karpel (1917–1995), baseball player
- Kurt Katch (1896–1958), actor
- Al Lapin Jr. (1927–2004), co-founder of IHOP
- Abe Levitow (1922–1975), animator
- Harvey Lembeck (1923–1982), actor, father of actor/director Michael Lembeck
- Larry D. Mann (1922–2014), actor
- Nicholas Markowitz (1984–2000), murder victim
- Groucho Marx (1890–1977), actor/comedian
- Vic Mizzy (1916–2009), composer
- Brad Morrow (1942–1997), actor
- Buck Ram (1907–1991), songwriter
- Catya Sassoon (1968–2002), actress/model
- Hacham Yedidia Shofet (1908–2004), Chief Rabbi of Iran and worldwide spiritual leader of Persian Jewry
- Roy Stuart (1927–2005), actor
- George Wyle (1915–2003), film and television composer
