= Yedidia Shofet =

Former Chief Rabbi of Iran

Hacham Yedidia Shofet
- Born: November 14, 1908; Kashan, Sublime State of Iran
- Died: June 24, 2005 (aged 96); Los Angeles, California, United States
- Resting place: Eden Memorial Park Cemetery
- Occupation: Rabbi
- Spouse: Rabbanit Heshmat Shofet
- Children: Yaffa Nazarzadeh, David Shofet, Mussa Shofet, Morad Shophet, Abraham Shofet, Naima Abrishami

Yedidia Shofet (also spelled Shophet, and often referred to as Hakham Yedidia; 14 November 1908 – June 24, 2005) was the former Chief Rabbi of Iran and the worldwide spiritual leader of Persian Jewry.

== Early life ==
Yedidia Shofet was born on 14 November 1908, in Kashan, Iran. He came from a Sephardic Jewish family of rabbis going back twelve generations. He moved to Tehran shortly after World War II. He was fluent in several languages, including Persian, Kashi, Aramaic, and Hebrew.

== Career ==
=== In Iran ===
Shofet served as the Chief Rabbi of Iran. He became a liaison and spokesperson for Iranian Jews before the Shah, government officials, and Islamic clerics. In the early 1950s, he was instrumental in persuading Mohammad Reza Shah and other government officials to allow Iraqi Jews, who had been forced to leave Iraq, to find temporary refuge in Iran before eventually migrating to Israel.

=== Rabbinic Relationships ===
Shofet corresponded with rabbinic authorities of his day, such as Ovadia Hedaya and Ovadia Yosef.

=== Post Revolution ===
Following the Iranian Revolution of 1979 and the execution of Habib Elghanian, Shofet, along with thousands of other Iranian Jews, immigrated to Southern California. While no longer working as a liaison for Iranian Jews, he continued to serve as a symbolic religious figure, urging Iranian Jewish families to preserve their Jewish tradition. In the United States, Shofet, with his son and other community leaders, helped establish the Nessah Synagogue in Beverly Hills, California.

== Personal life ==
Shofet was married to Rabbanit Heshmat Shofet. They had four sons including David Shofet and two daughters.

== Death ==
Shofet died on June 24, 2005, in Los Angeles, California. He was ninety-six years old. He was buried at the Eden Memorial Park Cemetery in Mission Hills, California.

== Gallery ==
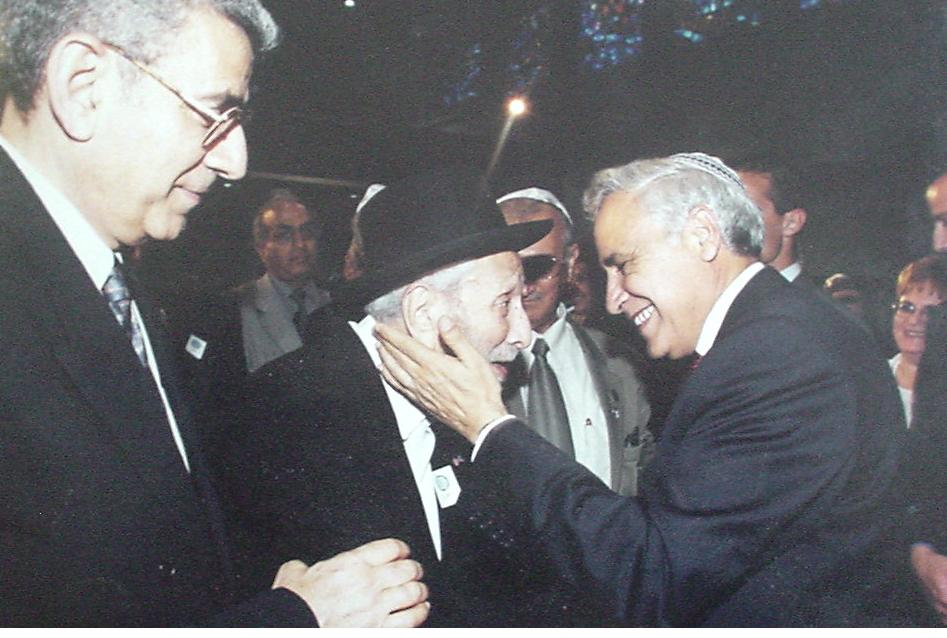
Hakham Yedidia Shofet and Rabbi David Shofet meet with Israeli President Moshe Katsav

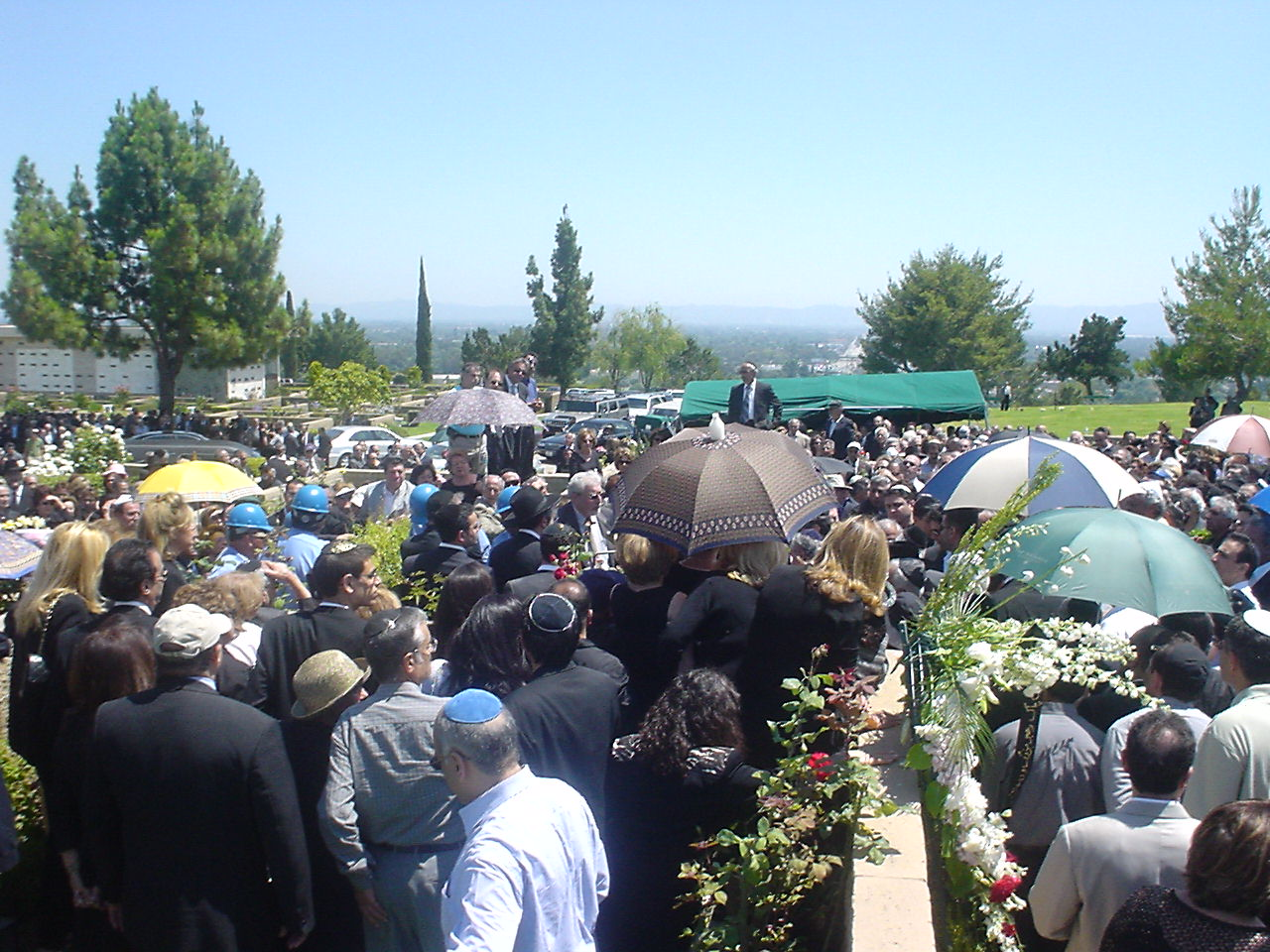
Hundreds attend the burial ceremony of Hacham Yedidia Shofet in Mission Hills, California - June 2005

Jewish titles
Preceded by David Shofet	Chief Rabbi of Iran; 1922–1980	Succeeded by Uriel Davidi
