= Oscar Blandi =

American hairdresser

- Born: Naples, Italy
- Occupation: Hair stylist

Oscar Blandi (Pronounced BLAHN-dee) is a celebrity hair stylist best known for his work with Kelly Ripa, Sofia Vergara, Faith Hill, and other high-profile clients.

== Early life ==
Oscar Blandi was born and raised in Naples, Italy. He began styling hair at the age of fourteen in the back of his father's salon, and left to work in several of his father's colleagues’ salons. Blandi attended art school. Later he moved to the United States, and worked in the early 1990s as the lead stylist for Sergio Valente, a midtown Manhattan salon. His brother, Luca, joined him there and began his career. He subsequently opened his own salon in the Plaza Hotel on Madison Avenue. In 2005, Blandi launched his self-developed Oscar Blandi Product Collection.

== Salon ==
The Oscar Blandi Salon opened in 1998. His team consists of about 30 stylists (including his brother, Luca Blandi), manicurists, and beauticians.

== Clientele ==
Blandi's celebrity clientele include Jessica Alba, Mischa Barton, Monica Bellucci, Jessica Biel, Jennifer Connelly, Kirsten Dunst, Jennifer Garner, Sarah Michelle Gellar, Salma Hayek, Faith Hill, Katie Holmes, Julia Louis-Dreyfus, Katharine McPhee, Sienna Miller, Julianne Moore, Kelly Ripa, Shakira, Molly Sims, Uma Thurman, Sofia Vergara, Reese Witherspoon and Renée Zellweger. Blandi has also toured with Tom Cruise as a hair consultant for the filming of Mission: Impossible III.

== Press and appearances ==
| Date | Press/Appearance |
|---|---|
| 12-Jul-08 | TyraShow.warnerbros.com |
| 23-Jul-08 | Sheer Genius |
| 16-Oct-08 | Tim Gunn's Guide to Style |
| 4-Nov-08 | Brides.com |
| 5-May-09 | Vogue |
| Aug-09 | Harper's Bazaar |
| 15-Sep-09 | Lock & Mane |
| 21-Oct-09 | Vogue.com |
| 7-Dec-09 | Instyle.com |
| 12-Jan-10 | Oprah |
| 13-Jan-10 | Vogue.com |
| 8-Mar-10 | Lockandmane.com |
| 20-Apr-10 | WWD |
| 2-May-10 | BetterTV |
| 3-May-10 | Vogue.com |
| 5-May-10 | PeopleStyleWatch.com |
| 26-May-10 | Chron.com |
