= List of UK Country Albums Chart number ones of 2020 =

These are the Official Charts Company's UK Country Albums Chart number ones of 2020. The chart week runs from Friday to Thursday with the chart-date given as the following Thursday. Chart positions are based the multi-metric consumption of country music in the United Kingdom, blending traditional album sales, track equivalent albums, and streaming equivalent albums. The chart contains 20 positions.

In the iteration of the chart dated 3 January, Luke Combs's What You See Is What You Getspent its fifth total week at number one, having held the top spot for the final two weeks of 2019. It would go on to remain at the peak for the first three weeks of 2020 before being displaced by Nightfall by Little Big Town, who achieved their second number one album. What You See Is What You Get would return to the chart peak throughout the year, spending a total of seven weeks there in 2020. The Shires spent the most weeks at number one this year, with their fourth album Good Years holding the top spot for eleven weeks, including nine consecutive weeks between March and May. The Chicks spent four weeks at number one with Gaslighter, their first release since 2006. Rumer then spent a cumulative six weeks atop the chart with Nashville Tears. Towards the end of the year, Starting Over by Chris Stapleton became his fourth number one, and held the top spot for five nonconsecutive weeks. Other artists who spent multiple weeks at number one included Ashton Lane, Brothers Osborne, Carrie Underwood, Gretchen Peters, Jason Isbell, The Cadillac Three, and Willie Nelson, who each held the position for two weeks. The final number one of the year was Starting Over.

== Chart history ==
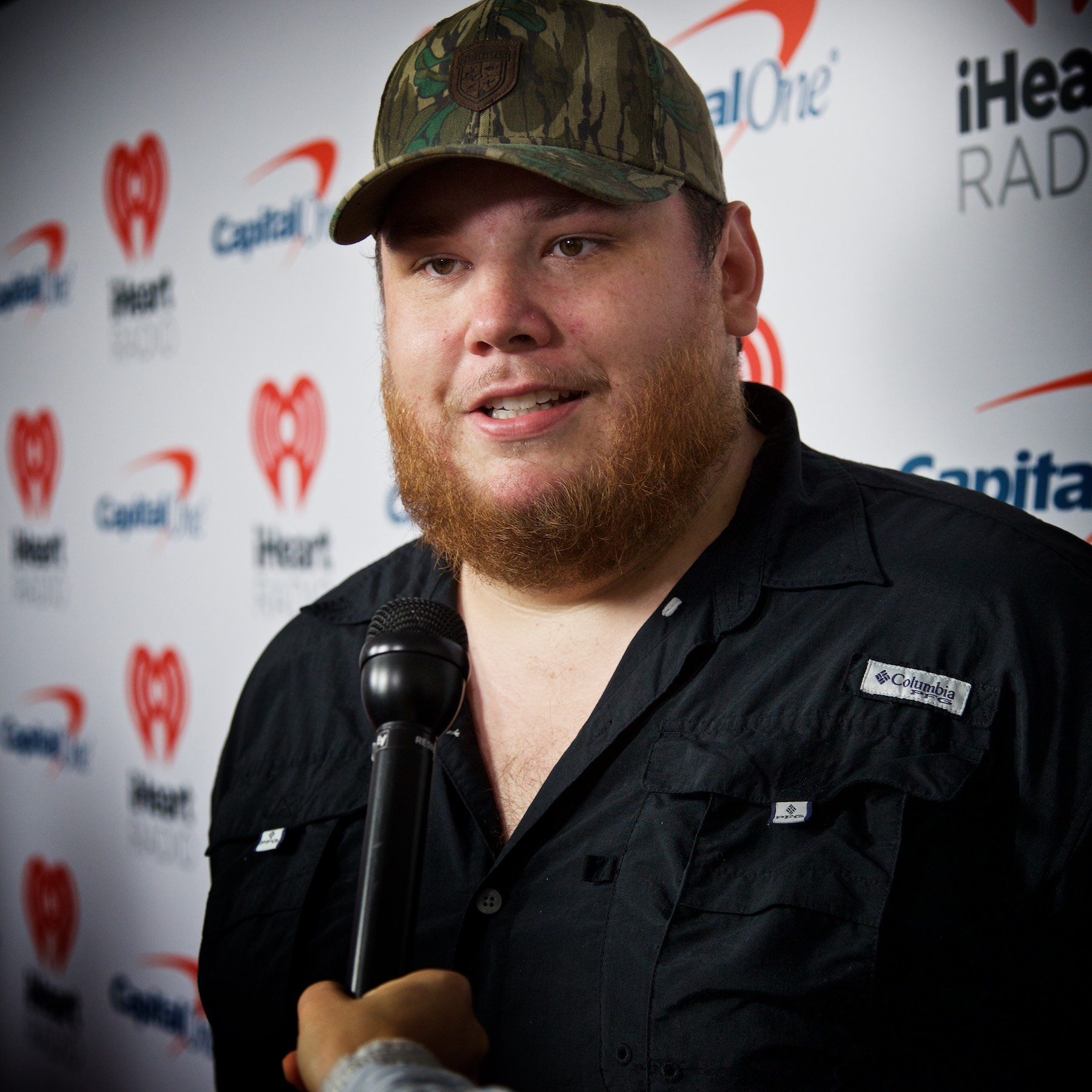
What You See Is What You Get by Luke Combs spent seven weeks at number one.

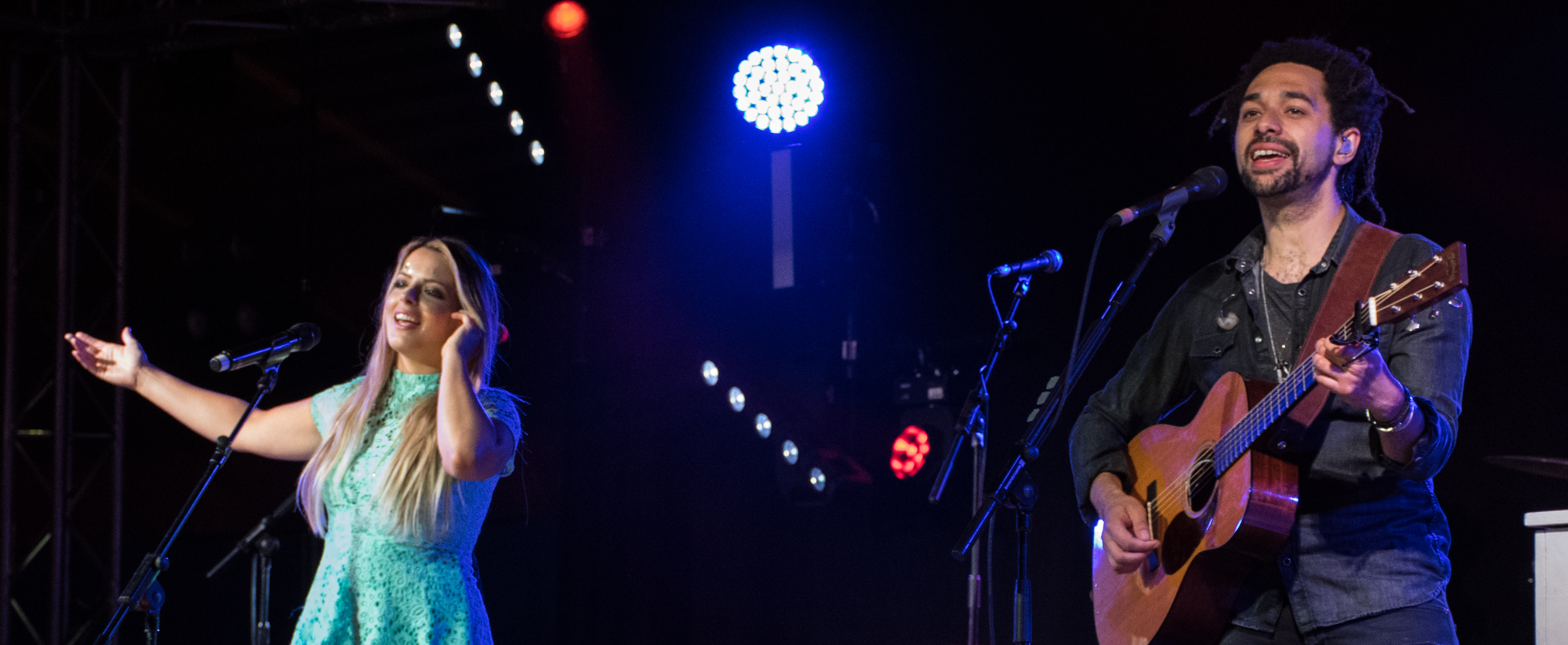
The Shires spent a leading eleven weeks at number one in 2020, with Good Years.

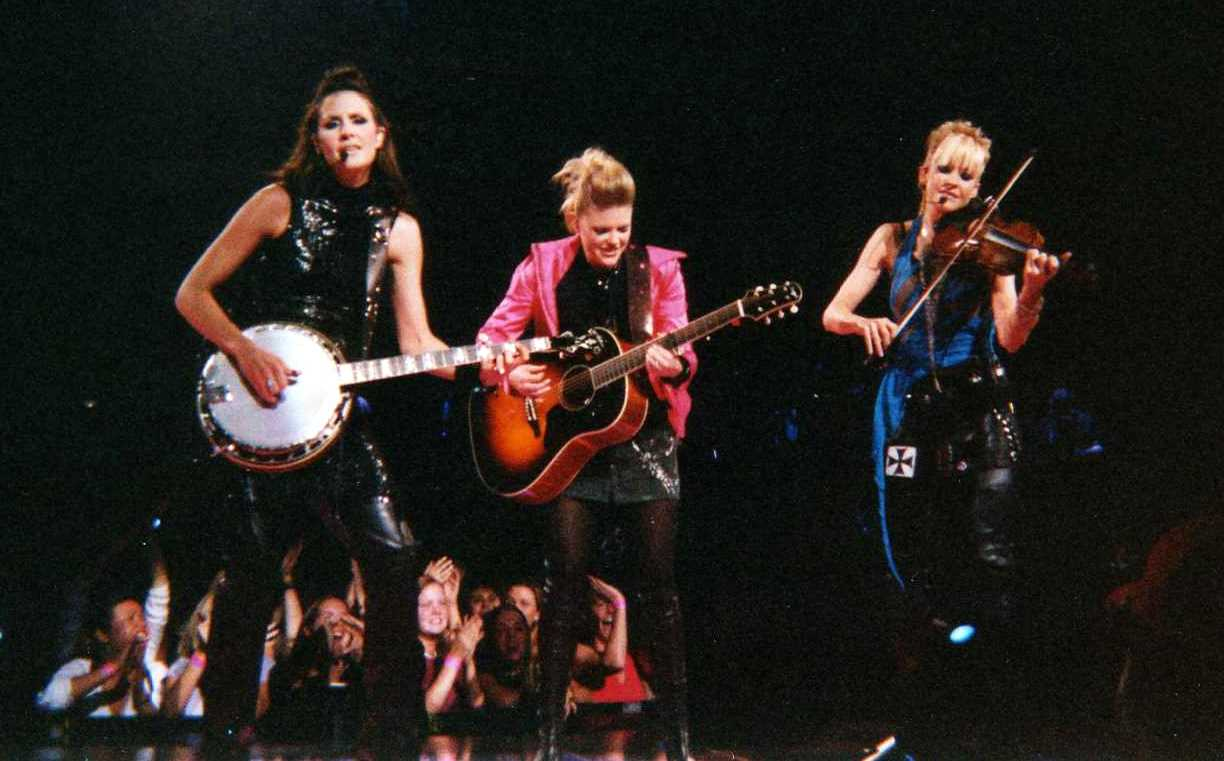
The Chicks held the top spot for four weeks with Gaslighter, their first album since 2006.

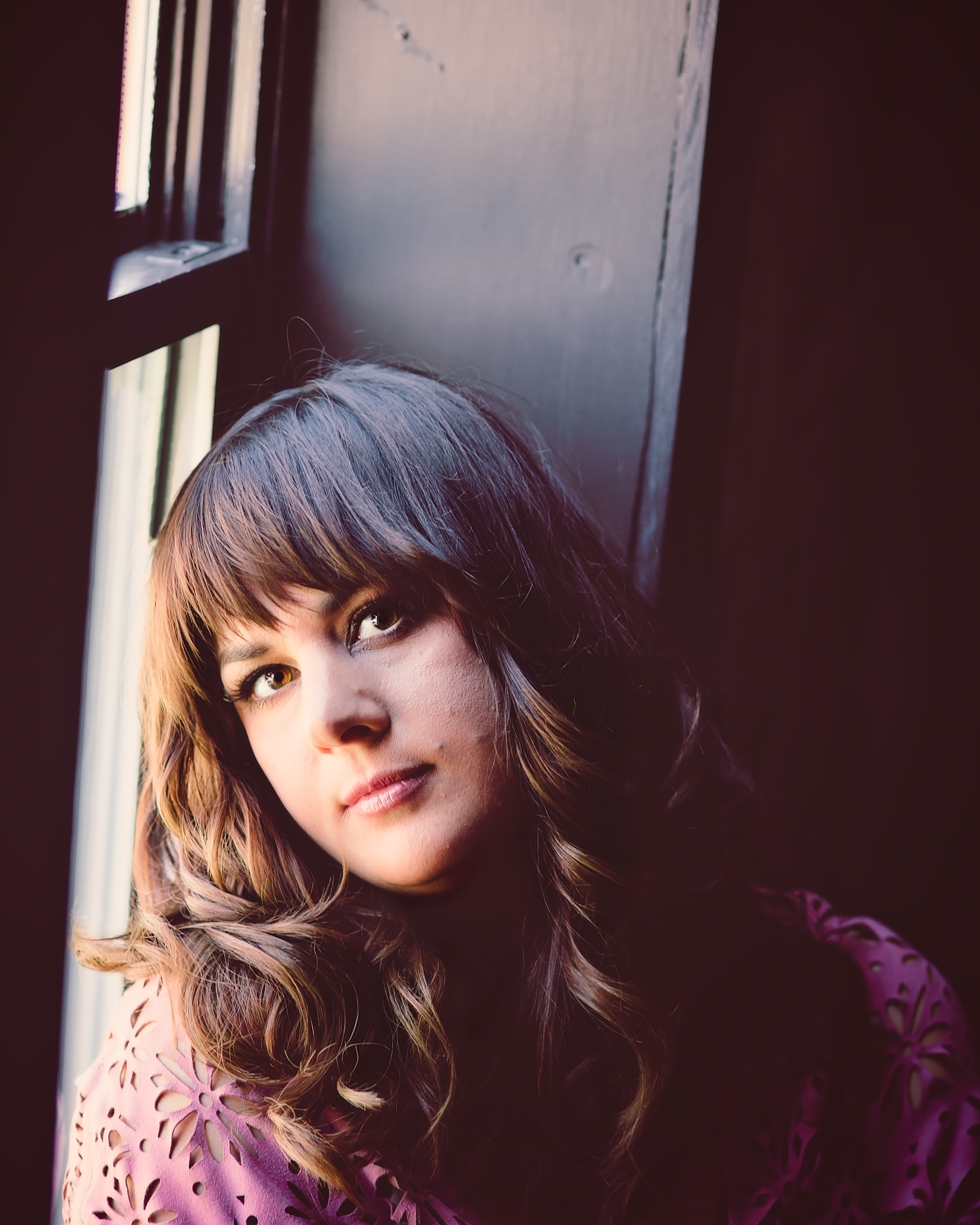
Nashville Tears by Rumer was number one for five weeks.

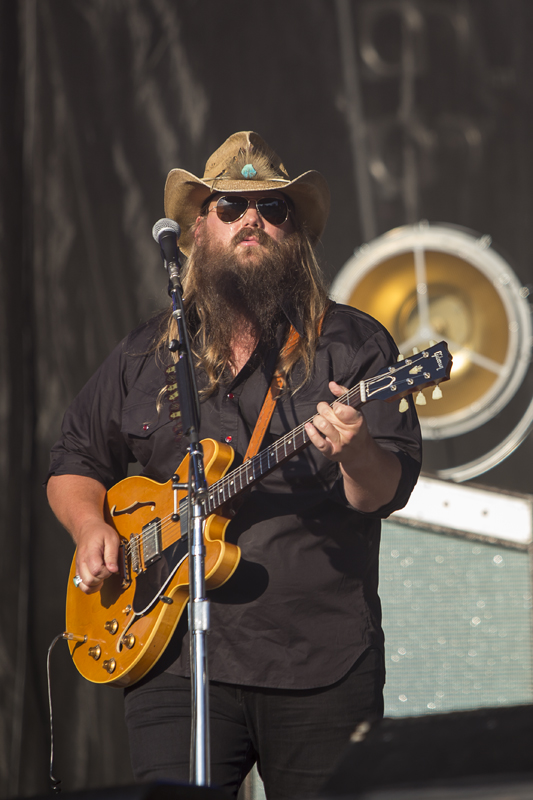
Chris Stapleton's Starting Over was number one for five weeks.

Issue date	Album	Artist(s)	Record label	Ref.
3 January	What You See is What You Get	Luke Combs	Columbia Nashville/River House	
10 January	What You See is What You Get	Luke Combs	Columbia Nashville/River House	
17 January	What You See is What You Get	Luke Combs	Columbia Nashville/River House	
24 January	Nightfall	Little Big Town	Decca	
31 January	Nightfall	Little Big Town	Decca	
7 February	What You See is What You Get	Luke Combs	Columbia Nashville/River House	
14 February	Country Fuzz	The Cadillac Three	Big Machine	
21 February	Country Fuzz	The Cadillac Three	Big Machine	
28 February	Travelling Mercies	Ashton Lane	OC	
6 March	Travelling Mercies	Ashton Lane	OC	
13 March	What You See is What You Get	Luke Combs	Columbia Nashville/River House	
20 March	Good Years	The Shires	BMG	
27 March	Good Years	The Shires	BMG	
3 April	Good Years	The Shires	BMG	
10 April	Good Years	The Shires	BMG	
17 April	Good Years	The Shires	BMG	
24 April	Good Years	The Shires	BMG	
1 May	Good Years	The Shires	BMG	
8 May	Good Years	The Shires	BMG	
15 May	Good Years	The Shires	BMG	
22 May	Reunions	Jason Isbell	Southeastern	
29 May	Reunions	Jason Isbell	Southeastern	
5 June	Ghosts of West Virginia	Steve Earle	New West	
12 June	Good Years	The Shires	BMG	
19 June	Good Years	The Shires	BMG	
26 June	The Night You Wrote That Song	Gretchen Peters	Sony	
3 July	The Night You Wrote That Song	Gretchen Peters	Sony	
10 July	First Rose of Spring	Willie Nelson	Sony	
17 July	First Rose of Spring	Willie Nelson	Sony	
24 July	Gaslighter	The Chicks	Columbia	
31 July	Gaslighter	The Chicks	Columbia	
7 August	Gaslighter	The Chicks	Columbia	
14 August	Gaslighter	The Chicks	Columbia	
21 August	Nashville Tears	Rumer	Cooking Vinyl	
28 August	Nashville Tears	Rumer	Cooking Vinyl	
4 September	Nashville Tears	Rumer	Cooking Vinyl	
11 September	Western Swing & Waltzes and Other Punchy Songs	Colter Wall	La Honda	
18 September	Nashville Tears	Rumer	Cooking Vinyl	
25 September	Nashville Tears	Rumer	Cooking Vinyl	
2 October	My Gift	Carrie Underwood	EMI	
9 October	My Gift	Carrie Underwood	EMI	
16 October	Skeletons	Brothers Osborne	Spinefarm	
23 October	Skeletons	Brothers Osborne	Spinefarm	
30 October	What You See is What You Get	Luke Combs	Columbia Nashville/River House	
6 November	What You See is What You Get	Luke Combs	Columbia Nashville/River House	
13 November	The Otherside	Cam	Mercury Nashville	
20 November	Starting Over	Chris Stapleton	Mercury Nashville	
27 November	Starting Over	Chris Stapleton	Mercury Nashville	
4 December	Starting Over	Chris Stapleton	Mercury Nashville	
11 December	The Road to Christmas	Derek Ryan	Sharpe Music	
18 December	Starting Over	Chris Stapleton	Mercury Nashville	
25 December	Starting Over	Chris Stapleton	Mercury Nashville	

== Most weeks at number one ==
Weeks at number one	Artist
11	The Shires
7	Luke Combs
5	Chris Stapleton
5	Rumer
4	The Chicks
2	Ashton Lane
2	Brothers Osborne
2	Carrie Underwood
2	Gretchen Peters
2	Jason Isbell
2	Little Big Town
2	The Cadillac Three
2	Willie Nelson

== See also ==
- List of UK Albums Chart number ones of 2020
- List of UK Dance Singles Chart number ones of 2020
- List of UK Album Downloads Chart number ones of 2020
- List of UK Independent Albums Chart number ones of 2020
- List of UK R&B Albums Chart number ones of 2020
- List of UK Rock & Metal Albums Chart number ones of 2020
- List of UK Compilation Chart number ones of the 2020s
