= Dangerous (Rumer song) =

Single by Rumer

from the album Into Colour
- Released: 22 September 2014
- Studio: Electric Lady Studios and Frisbie Studios; New York City; Water Studios; Hoboken, New Jersey; RAK Studios; London
- Genre: Disco; pop
- Length: 3:57
- Label: Atlantic
- Songwriter(s): Sarah Joyce; Rob Shirakbari; Rick Nowels; Stephen Bishop
- Producer(s): Rob Shirakbari

Rumer singles chronology
"Sara Smile" (2012)	"Dangerous" (2014)	"Reach Out" (2014)

"Dangerous" is a song written and performed by British singer–songwriter Sarah Joyce, known by her stage name as Rumer, for her third studio album Into Colour (2014). It was released on 22 September 2014 and differs from most of her songs for its disco style and upbeat tone. The song was well received by critics and peaked at number 36 on the Japan Hot 100.

== Composition ==
Joyce explained that "Dangerous" was about her fear of re-entering the music industry following bipolar disorder, post-traumatic stress disorder and ADHD, only translated to a love song: "I had so much resistance to going back into writing and performing publicly again that I realised I wasn't going to be able to break through it until I literally wrote a song about the resistance itself." She sings on the song, "It's taken me a long time to feel better babe / I've only just begun to feel my heart again." Helen Brown, a writer for The Daily Telegraph, suggested the line "You want me to let go/ You want me to lose control/ But I don't want to lose control," was a response to "critics who find her too smooth and safe." Musically, "Dangerous" is an uptempo, 1970s-inspired disco-pop track that includes strings, jazz-esque bass, and a funk guitar section in its instrumentation, and the song differs from most of her music for being upbeat and disco-tinged.

== Critical reception ==
Glasswerk called "Dangerous" an "instant classic." Tom Ingham praised Joyce's vocal performance as her "most colourful and charged" to date. The Observer critic Paul Mardles, labeling most of Into Colour as "flat" and "forgettable," found "Dangerous" to be the album's most memorable track for its disco style. Writer Paul John, however, criticized it for being a "slightly dishonest representation of the remainder of the album," but nonetheless called it "a wonderful song in and of itself." The Daily Express described it as a "smooth and sexy hommage to the elegant days of early disco. Less 'sweaty dancefloor' and more 'martinis and mirrorballs.' Just the way we like it."

== Music video ==
On 15 October 2014, a video for the song "Dangerous" was released. Directed by Anthony Byrne and produced by Jess Bell, the video depicts a manager for a ballet company who crushes on a male ballet dancer.

== Personnel ==
Adapted from the liner notes of Into Colour:

- Written and sung by Sarah Joyce
- Backing vocals by Porter Carroll and Sharon Bryant
- Production, writing, arrangement, conducting, bass, piano, organ, percussion, additional programming, and engineering by Rob Shirakbari
- Also written by Rick Nowels and Stephen Bishop
- Recorded at Electric Lady Studios and Frisbie Studios in New York City, Water Studios in Hoboken, New Jersey, and RAK Studios in London
- Alto saxophone by Lisa Graheme
- Baritone and tenor saxophone by Derek Nash
- Bass by Zev Katz
- Cello by Dave Daniels, Ian Burdge, Martin Loveday, and Richard Harwood
- Drums and percussion by Ash Soan
- Guitar by Paul Pesco
- Trombone by Winston Rollins
- Trumpet by Chris Storr and Martin Shaw
- Viola by Bill Hawkes, Bruce White, Maxine Moore, and Nick Barr
- Violin by Alison Dods, Chris Tombling, Emlyn Singleton, Everton Nelson, Ian Humphries, Magnus Johnstone, Mark Berrow, Matt Ward, Natalia Bonner, Patrick Kiernan, Rita Manning, and Steve Morris
- Strings recorded and engineered by Geoff Foster
- Mixed by Michael H. Brauer at Electric Lady Studios
- Assistant mixing and Pro Tools engineering by Mark Bengtson
- Also engineered by Mike Horner, Richard Woodcraft, Sean Kelly, John Horne), and Steve Vealey
- Mastered by Bob Ludwig

== Release history ==
Region	Date	Format(s)	Label
Worldwide	22 September 2014	Digital download; streaming	Atlantic

== Charts ==
Chart (2014–15)	Peak position
Belgium (Ultratip Flanders)	22
Belgium Airplay (Ultratop Flanders)	20
Japan (Japan Hot 100)	36
