= Goodbye Girl (David Gates album) =

Studio album by David Gates
- Released: June 1978 (Reissued 2008)
- Genre: Pop rock, soft rock
- Length: 48:42
- Label: Elektra, Wounded Bird
- Producer: David Gates

David Gates chronology
Never Let Her Go (1975)	Goodbye Girl (1978)	Falling in Love Again (1980)

Singles from Goodbye Girl
- 1. "Goodbye Girl" Released: December 1977; 2. "Took the Last Train" Released: August 1978

Professional ratings
Review scores
Source	Rating
AllMusic	4/5 stars

Goodbye Girl is an album by the American musician David Gates, released in 1978. The title track was used in the film of the same name. The album peaked at No. 165 on the Billboard 200.

"Took the Last Train" was released as a follow-up single, which also became a U.S. and Canadian top 40 hit.

Only tracks 1–4, 6 and 7 are new material; the remainder are reissued from previous albums.

== Track listing ==
All tracks written by David Gates, except "Took the Last Train", which was written by Gates and Larry Knechtel.

1. "Goodbye Girl" (2:45)
2. "Took the Last Train" (4:32)
3. "Overnight Sensation" (4:58)
4. "California Lady" (3:52)
5. "Ann" (previously released on First) (3:50)
6. "Drifter" (3:37)
7. "He Don't Know How to Love You" (2:43)
8. "Suite: Clouds, Rain" (previously released on First) (8:52)
9. "Lorilee" (previously released on First) (4:42)
10. "Part-Time Love" (previously released on Never Let Her Go) (2:23)
11. "Sunday Rider" (previously released on First) (3:21)
12. "Never Let Her Go" (previously released on Never Let Her Go) (3:07)

== Charts ==
Chart (1978)	Peak position
Australian (Kent Music Report)	69

== Personnel ==
"Goodbye Girl"

- David Gates – vocals, piano, acoustic guitar, bass
- Dean Parks – electric guitar
- Mike Botts – drums

"Took the Last Train"

- David Gates – vocals, bass
- Dean Parks – guitar
- Larry Knechtel – piano, moog synthesizer
- Jim Horn – alto saxophone
- Mike Botts – drums

"Overnight Sensation"

- David Gates – vocals, acoustic guitar
- Larry Knechtel – bass
- Dean Parks – guitar solo
- Mike Botts – drums

"California Lady"

- David Gates – vocals, rhythm guitar
- Larry Knechtel – bass
- Dean Parks – guitar solo
- Mike Botts – drums

"Ann"

- David Gates – vocals, guitar, bass

"Drifter"

- David Gates – vocals, acoustic guitar
- Larry Knechtel – bass
- Dean Parks – electric guitar solo
- Mike Botts – drums
- Dan Dugmore – steel guitar
- David Lindley – fiddle

"He Don't Know How to Love You"

- David Gates – vocals, acoustic guitar
- Larry Knechtel – bass
- Dean Parks – guitar solo
- Mike Botts – drums

"Clouds Suite Clouds"

- David Gates – vocals, piano, moog
- Larry Knechtel – bass
- Russ Kunkel – drums

"Clouds Suite Rain"

- David Gates – vocals, piano, guitar
- Larry Knechtel – bass, moog solos
- Jim Gordon – drums

"Lorilee"

- David Gates – vocals, electric guitar, bass
- Larry Knechtel – electric piano, organ
- Jim Gordon – drums
- Mike Botts – drums, congas
- Jim Horn – alto saxophone

"Part-Time Love"

- David Gates – vocals, acoustic guitar, bass
- Larry Knechtel – electric piano

"Sunday Rider"

- David Gates – vocals, rhythm guitar
- Larry Knechtel – bass
- John Guerin – drums
- Larry Carlton – guitar solo
