= Goodbye Girl (David Gates song) =

Single by David Gates

from the album Goodbye Girl
- B-side: "Sunday Rider"
- Released: December 1977
- Genre: Soft rock
- Length: 2:45
- Label: Elektra
- Songwriter: David Gates
- Producer: David Gates

David Gates singles chronology
| "Never Let Her Go" (1975) | "Goodbye Girl" (1977) | "Took the Last Train" (1978) |

"Goodbye Girl" is a song by David Gates, lead singer of Bread, which was released as a single in December 1977 following the premiere of the hit film of the same name. As the theme song to the film, the song reached number 15 on the Billboard Hot 100, becoming the biggest hit of Gates' solo career. It also reached number three on the Adult Contemporary chart. The song is from Gates' third solo album of the same name, released the following year.

== Personnel ==
- David Gates – vocals, piano, bass, acoustic guitar
- Dean Parks – electric guitar
- Mike Botts – drums

== Charts ==
=== Weekly charts ===
| Chart (1977–1978) | Peak position |
|---|---|
| Australian (Kent Music Report) | 38 |
| Canada RPM Top Singles | 8 |
| Canada RPM Adult Contemporary | 5 |
| US Billboard Hot 100 | 15 |
| US Adult Contemporary (Billboard) | 3 |
| US Cash Box Top 100 | 9 |

=== Year-end charts ===
| Chart (1978) | Rank |
|---|---|
| Canada RPM Top Singles | 51 |
| US Billboard Hot 100 | 47 |
| US Cash Box Top 100 | 76 |

== Cover versions ==
- Alternative rock band Hootie & the Blowfish released a cover of "Goodbye Girl" on their compilation album, The Best of Hootie & the Blowfish: 1993–2003 (2004). Their version was recorded for the television remake of the original film.
- British singer-songwriter Rumer released a cover version on her album Seasons of My Soul (2011).
