= Rob Shirakbari =

American musician, composer and producer (born 1963)

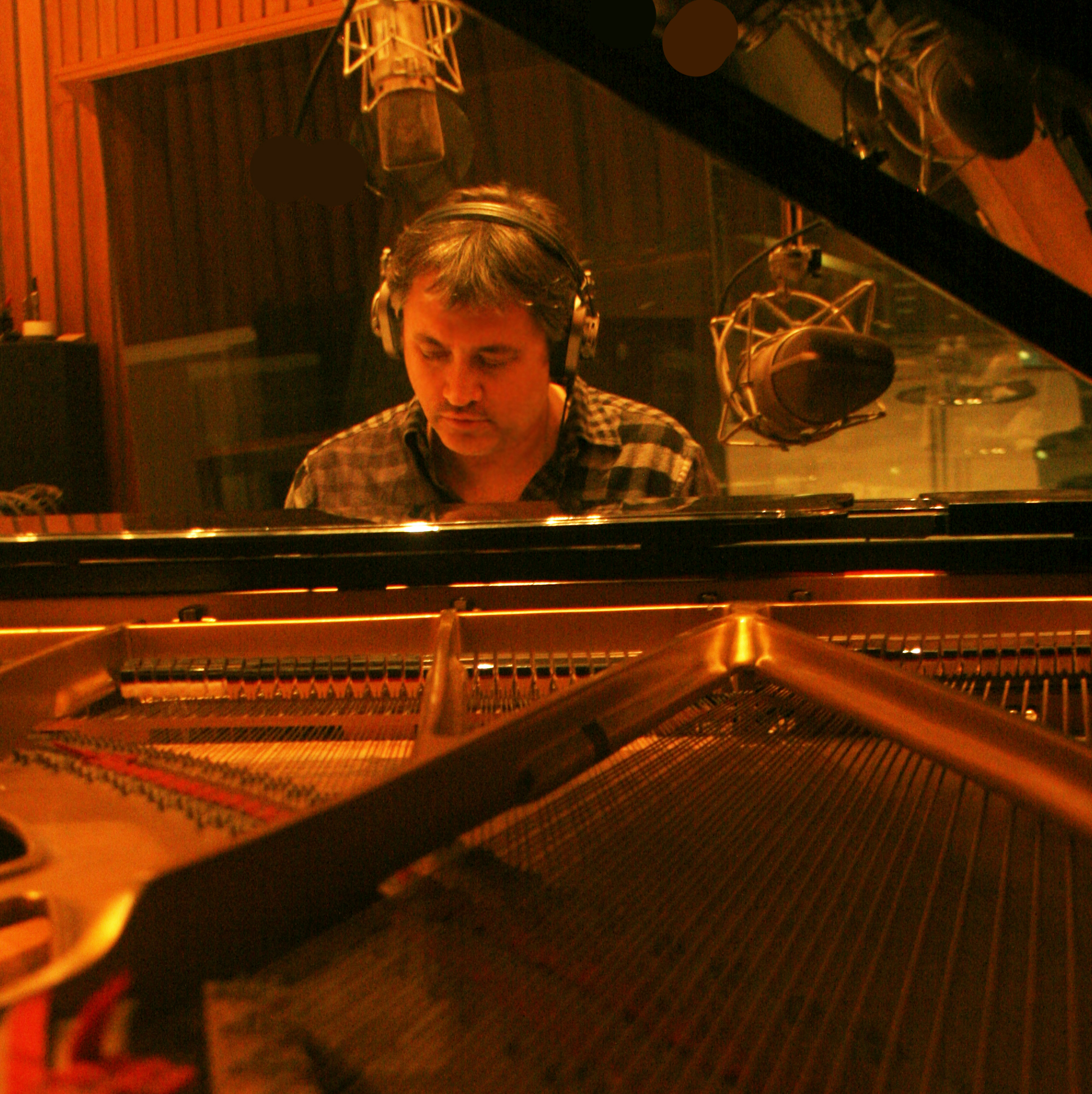
- Shirakbari at Capitol Studios in 2016

Background information
- Also known as: Rob Shrock
- Born: John Robert Shirakbari; November 15, 1963 (age 62); Dermott, Arkansas, U.S.
- Genres: Rock, pop, and soul
- Occupations: Producer, musician, songwriter, orchestrator, arranger
- Instruments: Piano, keyboards, guitar, bass
- Years active: 1979–present
- Spouse: Rumer (2015 - present)
- Website: shirakbari.com

Rob (Shrock) Shirakbari is an American musician, composer, record producer, and arranger, best known for being long-time music director for Dionne Warwick (1985–2020) and Burt Bacharach (1996 - 2010) and as producer, co-writer, and music director for Rumer (2013–present).

Shirakbari has worked with Todd Rundgren, Aretha Franklin, Adele, Sheryl Crow, Elton John, Stevie Wonder, Sting, Elvis Costello, Wynonna Judd, Duffy, Ronald Isley, Peabo Bryson, Chris Botti, and Whitney Houston among other successful recording artists. He served on the NARAS Board of Governors for the Texas Chapter from 1998 to 2000.

== Early life ==
Shirakbari was born in Dermott, Arkansas, on November 15, 1963, to parents Nasser and Betty Kay (née Seamans) Shirakbari. His father is a retired pharmaceutical doctor of Iranian heritage, and his mother is a retired pharmacy technician.

Shirakbari began playing trumpet at ten years old in his elementary school band. He later began playing guitar and teaching himself to play piano at age thirteen. His composing and conducting career started early by writing the Alma Mater for his Junior high school which was debuted with the school's concert band. He later studied piano with renowned teacher Marjorie Mae Bond, and studied composition with Francis McBeth at Ouachita Baptist University. In high school, he played keyboards and guitar in several bands and developed his songwriting and recording skills.

== Music career ==
=== Dionne Warwick ===
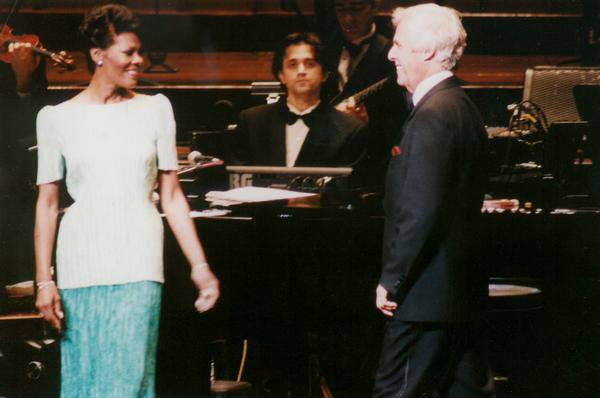
Dionne Warwick, Rob (Shrock) Shirakbari, Burt Bacharach 1995

Shirakbari began working with Dionne Warwick in 1985. He has toured extensively with her around the world as her music director, arranger, and pianist. He has produced and performed on albums, Friends Can Be Lovers (1993), Dionne Sings Dionne (1998), The Best of Dionne Warwick (2001), This Christmas (2014), and She’s Back (2019).

=== Burt Bacharach ===
Shirakbari began working closely with Burt Bacharach in early 1987 when Bacharach and Warwick reunited and began touring together. Shirakbari became Bacharach's protege and was involved in recording sessions and arrangements with Bacharach. In 1996, Shirakbari became Bacharach's music director and together they wrote the arrangements for Bacharach's revamped live show, with many of the arrangements still being played in Burt's live show today. He toured extensively around the world with Bacharach until late 2010.

Shirakbari performed on One Amazing Night (1998), Sessions at West 54th (Bacharach/Elvis Costello) (2001), Isley meets Bacharach - Here I Am (Ron Isley/Burt Bacharach) (2003), At This Time (2005), Live at The Sydney Opera House (Mixed with Allen Sides) (2008), and What Love Can Do (Burt Bacharach/Peabo Bryson) (2009).

=== Rumer ===
Shirakbari began working with recording artist (and now wife) Rumer, as her co-writer, producer, pianist, keyboardist, and arranger in 2013. The two met briefly at a World Hunger Day gala at the Royal Albert Hall in London hosted by Dionne Warwick in 2012, where Shirakbari was music director and Rumer and Warwick sang a duet of Bacharach & David's, “Hasbrook Heights.” Rumer later moved to Los Angeles in 2013, following the release of her album, Boy’s Don’t Cry, where the two began working together.

- 2014: Into Colour (producer, musician, and arranger)

Shirakbari produced Rumer's second album of all original material, Into Colour, (co-written by Rumer, Rob Shirakbari, and Stephen Bishop) and her third studio album, which was released on November 10, 2014, in the UK, Ireland, and Japan. The record was then released worldwide in early 2015 by Atlantic Records. Dangerous, and Reach Out were the first singles to be released from the album, both charting on BBC Radio 2. Dangerous was BBC Radio 2 Record Of The Week (October 13–19, 2014) and reached #2 and Reach Out was BBC Radio 2 Record Of The Week (December 21–27, 2014) and reached #10 on the charts. Into Colour spent 9 weeks on the UK music charts and peaked at #12.

- 2015: B Sides and Rarities (producer, mixer, musician, mastering, arranger)

B Sides and Rarities charted on the UK music charts at #97

- 2015: Love Is The Answer EP (producer, mixer, musician, arranger)
- 2016: This Girl's in Love: A Bacharach and David Songbook (producer, mixer, musician, arranger)

Rumer's fifth album, This Girl's in Love, released under the East West Records label, features select tracks from the songbook of Burt Bacharach and Hal David. It was released on November 25, 2016, and reached #28 on the UK Music Charts. It was produced by Shirakbari at RAK Studios in London and Capitol Studios in Los Angeles in 2016.

== Artist development ==
Shirakbari has spent a substantial part of his career working with and developing new, young artists. He has worked with LeAnn Rimes, Mikaila, Kristy Lee Cook, Kate & Kacey, and many others at early stages in their music careers.

== Film Composing, Soundtracks, and Live Television Performances ==
Shirakbari, Burt Bacharach, and Don Was were the music directors and arrangers for the 72nd Academy Awards. He wrote the arrangements and conducted the pit orchestra for the four-hour awards show and played keyboards in the on-camera band that featured Oscar-winning songs performed by Faith Hill, Ray Charles, Garth Brooks, Queen Latifah, Dionne Warwick and Isaac Hayes.

Year	Production	Title	Role
2023	American Experience (PBS) (Soundtrack)	The Harvest	Composer, Film score
2022	Marlowe (Soundtrack)	Impossible (with Jade Vincent)	Composer, Producer, String conductor, Piano, Drums, Bass
2012	Switchmas (Soundtrack)	I Just Can't Do Without Christmas	Producer, Arranger, Mixer, Piano, Bass, Keyboards, Programming
2000	Soundstage (TV Series Documentary)	Ronald Isley and Burt Bacharach	Musician
2001	American Idol Season 2: All-Time Classic American Love Songs (Soundtrack)	What The World Needs Now Is Love	Co-producer, Keyboards
2001	Looney Tunes (Soundtrack)	Christmas With Frosty the Snowman & Friends	Orchestrator, Keyboards, Synthesizer, Programming, Rhythm, Engineer
2000	Sessions at West 54th (Televised Live Performance)	Elvis Costello/Burt Bacharach	Arranger, Keyboards
2000	102 Dalmatians (Soundtrack)	Original Soundtrack	Keyboards, Drum and Synthesizer Programming
2000	Looney Tunes (Soundtrack)	Kwazy Christmas	Orchestrator, Keyboards, Synthesizer, Programming, Rhythm, Engineer
1999	The Murder in China Basin (Soundtrack)	Original Soundtrack	Producer, Composer, Lyricist, Arranger
1998	Burt Bacharach (TV Special)	One Amazing Night	Arranger, Musician
1992	The Johnny Carson Show (Televised Live Performance)	Dionne Warwick	Musician, Arranger

== Writer ==
As a writer, Shirakbari has been a long-time contributor to Keyboard Magazine, Electronic Musician, Mix Magazine, and Remix Magazine (among others), writing feature articles and product reviews.

== Teaching and mentoring ==
Shirakbari has taught and mentored at various industry events speaking on topics covering songwriting, arranging, and music production. He has taught master classes and workshops at Otis Redding Foundation Music Camp (Macon, Georgia), Bimm Music Institute (Dublin, Ireland), Henry Mancini Institute (Los Angeles, California), and various elementary, Jr. high and high schools.

== Discography ==
Title	Artist	Credits	Year
In Session (Album)	Rumer	Composer, Mastering, Mixing	2025
Sleep (Album)	Daphne Guinness	Piano, Co-producer	2024
The Man Who Would Not Die (Single)	OUIJA	Piano, Mixer	2024
B-Sides and Rarities Vol. 2 (Album)	Rumer	Composer, Producer, Engineer, Arranger, Conductor, Remixing, Mastering, Bass, Drums, Piano, Guitar, Strings, Wurlitzer	2022
Live From Lafayette (Live Album)	Rumer	Composer, Producer, Mixing, Mastering, Piano, Keyboards, Backing Vocals	2021
Juniper Tree (Single)	Woman to Woman with (Rumer)	Composer, Producer	2021
Nashville Tears (Album)	Rumer	String Arranger, Conductor, Engineer	2020
New Year's Eve in New Orleans: Roll Up '78 and Light Up '79! (Album)	The Marshall Tucker Band	Mixing (as Rob Shrock)	2020
She's Back (Album)	Dionne Warwick	Producer, Piano, Keyboards, Percussion, Horns (as Rob Shrock)	2019
Dionne Warwick & The Voices of Christmas (Album)	Dionne Warwick	Musical Direction, String Arranger, Conductor	2019
This Girl's In Love: A Bacharach and David Songbook (Album)	Rumer	Producer, Mixing, Arranger, Conductor, Engineer, Piano, Bass, Rhodes, Nylon Guitar, Vibes, Synth	2016
You and I (Album)	Alani	Producer, Composer, Piano, Bass, Mixing	2016'
Love Is The Answer (EP) "	Rumer	Producer, Arranger and Conductor	2015
B-Sides & Rarities (Album)	Rumer	Producer, Mastering, Mixing, Arranger, Conductor, Songwriter, Piano, Bass, Synth, Acoustic Guitar	2015
Into Colour (Album)	Rumer	Producer, Arranger, Conductor, Songwriter, Piano, Bass, Wurlitzer, Organ, Rhodes, Acoustic Guitar, Vibes, Glockenspiel, Synth, Programming, Mixing	2015
This Christmas (Single)	Dionne Warwick	Producer, Arranger, Mixer, Piano, Bass, Keyboards, Programing	2014
BBC Radio 2's Sounds of the 80s ("Arthur's Theme") (Single)	Rumer	Producer, Arranger, Conductor, Mixer, Piano, Wurlitzer, Organ, Synth	2014
Movie Moods: Love Stories (Album)	Michael Omartian	Vocal Engineer	2014
Lose A Girl (Album)	Nicky Corbett	Piano, Strings	2013
Switchmas (Movie Soundtrack)	Annie Bany	Producer, Arranger, Mixing, Songwriter, Piano, Bass, Guitars, Kazoo	2012
Is Love a Fairy Tale? (Album)	Aoede	Piano, String Arrangements, String Conductor, Synthesizer, Wurlitzer	2012
Frail Hope Ranch (Album)	The Stripminers (featuring Brett Anderson of the Donnas)	String Arranger and Conductor	2012
Skeletons of the Muse (Album)	Aoede	Piano, Wurli, Synths, String Arrangements and Conducting	2012
Heart Strings (Album)	Mary Segato	Fender Rhodes, Guitar (Acoustic), Melodica, Organ, Piano, Synthesizer, Wurlitzer	2012
Never Let The Little Man Down (Album)	Scrote	Piano	2012
Affair with the Muse (Album)	Aoede	Keyboards, Piano, String Arrangements, String Conductor	2011
Barefoot & Young (Album)	Annie Bany	'roducer, Songwriter, Mixing, Arranger, Bass, Guitars, Keyboards, Melodica, Mandolin, String Arrangements	2011
Karima	Karima	Piano	2010
What Love Can Do	Burt Bacharach and Peabo Bryson	Arranger, Keyboards	2009
Live at the Sydney Opera House	Burt Bacharach	Arranger, Keyboards, Main Personnel, Mixing	2008
Pure Imagination	John Pagano	String Arrangement, Keyboards	2008
New Music From An Old Friend	Phil Ramone/Peabo Bryson	String Arrangements, Keyboards	2007
The Look of Love: Burt Bacharach Songbook (Album)	Traincha (Trijntje Oosterhuis)	Piano	2007
Transvalue Book III: The '58 Retractable Hardtop	Transvalue	Mastering	2007
Who'll Speak for Love	Traincha (Trijntje Oosterhuis)	Programming	2007
MusicTraks III (Album)	Penny Framstad	Producing, Mixing, Piano, Guitar, Bass, Co-writing	2006
At This Time (Album)	Burt Bacharach	Synthesizer	2005
At the Casbah	Shani	Composer, Piano	2005
Spotlight on Music: Grade 2 Disc 13	Various Artists	Arranger	2005
Spotlight on Music: Grade 2 Disc 17	Various Artists	Arranger	2005
Wet Dog Man	Paul Chesne	Conductor, String Arrangements	2005
American Idol Season 2: All-Time Classic American Love Songs	What The World Needs Now Is Love (Burt Bacharach)	Assistant Music Director, Keyboards, Mixing, Producer, Vocal Arrangement	2003
American Idol Season 2: All-Time Classic American Love Songs (Album)	Finalists	Keyboards	2003
Here I Am: Isley Meets Bacharach	Burt Bacharach / Ronald Isley	Keyboards	2003
So Damn Happy	Aretha Franklin	Keyboards, Synthesizer Arrangements	2003
Graham Colton	Graham Colton	String Arrangements, Keyboards	2000
Christmas with Frosty the Snowman & Friends	Looney Tunes	Bass, Drums, Keyboards, Programming, Rhythm, Synthesizer	2001
The Best of Dionne Warwick (Paradiso)	Dionne Warwick	Arranger, Engineer, Keyboards, Organ, Producer, Programming, String Arrangements	2001
The Best of Sessions at West 54th, Vol. 1	Burt Bacharach / Elvis Costello	Keyboards	2001
The Murder at China Basin (Album)	Original Soundtrack	Producer, Composer, Lyricist, Arranger	2000
102 Dalmatians (Album)	Original Soundtrack	Keyboards, Drum and Synth Programming	2000
Looney Tunes Kwazy Christmas	Looney Tunes	Bass, Drums, Engineer, Keyboards, Orchestration, Programming, Synthesizer	2000
Painted From Memory	Elvis Costello	Keyboards, Accordion	1998
Dionne Sings Dionne	Dionne Warwick	Arranger, Engineer, Keyboards, Organ, Percussion, Producer	1998
One Amazing Night	Burt Bacharach	Keyboards, Arranger	1998
Friends Can Be Lovers (Album)	Dionne Warwick	Producer, Arranger, Keyboards, Drums, Guitar	1993
Cure Me with the Groove	Citizen Swing (Album)	Producer, Engineer'	1992
