= Never Let Her Go (song) =

1974 single by David Gates

Single by David Gates

from the album Never Let Her Go
- B-side: "Watch Out"
- Released: 1974
- Recorded: 1974
- Genre: Soft rock
- Length: 3:09
- Label: Elektra Records
- Songwriter: David Gates
- Producer: David Gates

David Gates singles chronology
"Sad September" (1974)	"Never Let Her Go" (1974)	"Part-Time Love" (1975)

"Never Let Her Go" is a song by David Gates, lead singer of the group Bread. It was released as a single in 1974 and is the title track from the 1975 album of the same name. It also appeared on Gates' third solo album, Goodbye Girl.

The song reached number 29 on the Billboard Hot 100 and peaked at number 3 on the Adult Contemporary chart in March 1975.

It was actually recorded first back in 1966 by actor Frank Gorshin, famous as The Riddler on the 1960's Batman television series.

== Chart performance ==
Chart (1975)	Peak position
Australia (Kent Music Report)	77
U.S. Billboard Hot 100	29
U.S. Billboard Adult Contemporary	3
