= Seasons of My Soul =

Studio album by Rumer
- Released: 1 November 2010
- Recorded: 2009–2010
- Genre: Pop, soul
- Label: Atlantic
- Producer: Steve Brown

Rumer chronology
Seasons of My Soul (2010)	Boys Don't Cry (2012)

Singles from Seasons of My Soul
- 1. "Slow" Released: 23 August 2010; 2. "Aretha" Released: 25 October 2010; 3. "Am I Forgiven" Released: 29 April 2011

Professional ratings
Aggregate scores
Source	Rating
Metacritic	85/100
Review scores
Source	Rating
AllMusic	4/5 stars
Evening Standard	4/5 stars
The Guardian	4/5 stars
The Independent	4/5 stars
The Irish Times	4/5 stars
Mojo	5/5 stars
musicOMH	3.5/5 stars
PopMatters	9/10
Q	4/5 stars
Uncut	8/10

Seasons of My Soul is the debut studio album by British singer-songwriter Rumer. It was released on 1 November 2010. The album peaked to number 3 on the UK Albums Chart, it also charted in 11 countries including Australia, New Zealand, France, Sweden and Switzerland.

== Singles ==
- "Slow" was the first single released from the album, it featured on Smooth FM, and on BBC Radio 2 as a record of the week. It peaked to #16 on the UK Singles Chart and #33 on the Irish Singles Chart.
- "Aretha" was the second single, released on 24 October 2010. It peaked at #72 on the UK Singles Chart.

== Background ==
In an Interview with Robert Copsey of Digital Spy she explained why the album was called "Seasons of My Soul", she said: "Mainly because it took me so long to make the album that I noticed that the songs were coming round again. I'd have these moods in my soul that would come around like seasons over the years and the songs matched the moods. It was like an emotional landscape. There are different shades, different feels and different colours to the album. Some people have been saying that 'Slow' is an autumnal song and so is 'Aretha' in a way."

Meanwhile, in terms of its musical and lyrical influences, Rumer told Pete Lewis, Assistant Editor of Blues & Soul: "I think all the songs have elements of different things that have influenced me, and different MUSIC that's influenced me. Songs like 'Slow' and 'Come To Me High' have little dreamy, Bacharach-type chords and those lilting, gorgeous melodies that remind me of songs that I've heard and loved in films that were written by the fantastic composers from the Thirties like Irving Berlin and Rodgers & Hammerstein. Then 'Take Me As I Am' is very Laura Nyro & LaBelle - soulful with a gospel feel. ("When we did Take Me As I Am, we were listening to the Laura Nyro/Labelle album Gonna Take a Miracle. That was a huge influence on the record. New York Tendaberry as well." ) While 'Thankful' I think is very Joni Mitchell from her Hejira phase, where it's like a poem which describes a season in each verse... While lyrically the album is largely just classic autobiographical storytelling." Other influences on the album Rumer has cited are Judee Sill and, " Not necessarily in the songwriting, but in the production", Stephen Bishop.

== Track listing ==
Standard Edition

No.	Title	Writer(s)	Length
1.	"Am I Forgiven?"	Sarah Joyce, Steve Brown	3:28
2.	"Come to Me High"	Joyce	2:49
3.	"Slow"	Joyce	3:32
4.	"Take Me as I Am"	Joyce	3:45
5.	"Aretha"	Joyce, Brown	3:15
6.	"Saving Grace"	Joyce	3:20
7.	"Thankful"	Joyce, Brown	3:36
8.	"Healer"	Greg Churchill, Joyce	3:14
9.	"Blackbird"	Joyce	3:55
10.	"On My Way Home"	Joyce	4:29
11.	"Goodbye Girl"	David Gates	3:31

Deluxe version
No.	Title	Writer(s)	Length
12.	"Vertigo"		3:07
13.	"It Might Be You" (Theme from Tootsie)	Alan Bergman, Dave Grusin, Marilyn Bergman	3:25
14.	"Slow" (Music video)	Joyce
15.	"Aretha" (Music video)	Joyce, Brown

International version
No.	Title	Writer(s)	Length
12.	"Alfie"	Burt Bacharach, Hal David	2:52
13.	"It Might Be You" (Theme from Tootsie)	Bergman, Grusin, Bergman	3:25

== Chart and certifications ==
=== Weekly charts ===
Chart (2010–2012)	Peak position
Australian Albums (ARIA)	35
Austrian Albums (Ö3 Austria)	23
Belgian Albums (Ultratop Flanders)	6
Belgian Albums (Ultratop Wallonia)	11
Dutch Albums (Album Top 100)	2
Finnish Albums (Suomen virallinen lista)	32
French Albums (SNEP)	34
German Albums (Offizielle Top 100)	13
Irish Albums (IRMA)	7
Italian Albums (FIMI)	59
Japanese Albums (Oricon)	40
New Zealand Albums (RMNZ)	10
Norwegian Albums (VG-lista)	6
Scottish Albums (OCC)	4
Spanish Albums (PROMUSICAE)	59
Swedish Albums (Sverigetopplistan)	13
Swiss Albums (Schweizer Hitparade)	15
UK Albums (OCC)	3
US Billboard 200	46

=== Year-end charts ===
Chart (2010)	Position
UK Albums (OCC)	36

Chart (2011)	Position
Belgian Albums (Ultratop Flanders)	85
Dutch Albums (Album Top 100)	53
Swiss Albums (Schweizer Hitparade)	74
UK Albums (OCC)	38

=== Certifications ===
Region	Certification	Certified units/sales
Ireland (IRMA)	Platinum	15,000^{^}
United Kingdom (BPI)	2× Platinum	600,000^{*}
^{*} Sales figures based on certification alone.^{^} Shipments figures based on certification alone.

== Release history ==
Region	Date	Format	Label	Catalogue
United Kingdom	1 November 2010	CD, Digital Download	Atlantic records	B003YM5X1C
