= Am I Forgiven =

Single by Rumer

from the album Seasons of My Soul
- Released: 29 April 2011
- Recorded: 2010
- Genre: Soul, easy listening
- Length: 3:28
- Label: Atlantic
- Songwriter(s): Steve Brown, Rumer
- Producer(s): Steve Brown

Rumer singles chronology
"Aretha" (2010)	"Am I Forgiven" (2011)	"P.F. Sloan" (2012)

"Am I Forgiven" is a song by British female singer-songwriter Rumer. Produced by award-winning UK TV and musical composer Steve Brown, it was released as the third single from her debut album Seasons of My Soul on April 29, 2011.

== Music video ==
A music video to accompany the release of "Am I Forgiven" was first released onto YouTube on 11 February 2011 at a total length of three minutes and thirty-five seconds.

== Track listings ==
iTunes EP
No.	Title	Length
1.	"Am I Forgiven?"	3:28
2.	"Long Long Day"	3:10
3.	"Love Affection"	4:02

== Chart performance ==
Chart (2011)	Peak position
Belgium (Ultratip Bubbling Under Flanders)	28
Belgium (Ultratip Bubbling Under Wallonia)	9

== Release history ==
Region	Date	Format	Label
United Kingdom	29 April 2011	Digital download	Atlantic
