= Friends Can Be Lovers =

Studio album by Dionne Warwick
- Released: January 20, 1993
- Studios: Soundtrack Studios (New York City, New York); East Bay Studios (Tarrytown, New York); Ocean Way Recording, Conway Studios, A&M Studios and Studio 56 (Hollywood, California); Westlake Studios and Record One (Los Angeles, California); Encore Studios (Burbank, California); Valley Center Studios (Van Nuys, California); Luminous Sound (Dallas, Texas); Blue Zone Studios (Rochdale, England, UK)
- Genres: Funk; soul; pop
- Length: 46:40
- Label: Arista
- Producers: Burt Bacharach; Ian Devaney; Barry J. Eastmond; David Elliott; Masaki Kubo; Harvey Mason; Andy Morris; Dionne Warwick

Dionne Warwick chronology
Hidden Gems: The Best of Dionne Warwick, Vol. 2 (1992)	Friends Can Be Lovers (1993)	Aquarela do Brasil (1994)

Singles from Friends Can Be Lovers
- 1. "Sunny Weather Lover" Released: January 1993; 2. "Where My Lips Have Been" Released: June 1993; 3. "Friends Can Be Lovers" Released: 1993

Friends Can Be Lovers is the 29th studio album by American singer Dionne Warwick. Her tenth album for Arista Records, it was released on January 20, 1993, in the United States. Warwick gathered material from songwriters and producers such as Barry J. Eastmond, Harvey Mason, Siedah Garrett, Dianne Warren, and Blue Zone lead singer Lisa Stansfield. The album, which Warwick described as "a labor love" and true "family affair," also saw her collaborating with her son David Elliott and cousin Whitney Houston for the first time as well as reuniting with former contributors Burt Bacharach and Hal David on the song "Sunny Weather Love" after more than two decades.

The album was released to positive reception from music critics, who lauded Warwick's vocals, its production and the overall direction of the album. Commercially, though, Friends Can Be Lovers was a considerable decline from her previous efforts with Arista, becoming her first album since 1977 to not chart on the US Billboard 200 and reaching number 82 on the US Top R&B/Hip-Hop Albums only. Of all three singles that were released from the album, only "Where My Lips Have Been" was able to chart, peaking at number 95 on the Hot R&B/Hip-Hop Songs. Disappointed by its performance, Warwick later expressed her dislike of the album itself.

== Background ==
In 1990, Warwick released Dionne Warwick Sings Cole Porter, a tribute album consisting of standards by American songwriter Cole Porter. For her next project, her tenth regular album for Arista Records, Warwick stuck to her regular formula of changing most collaborators from album to album. In hopes of providing current material without changing Warwick's trademark sound, Arista Records head Clive Davis consulted Barry J. Eastmond to produce the majority of the album. With new jack swing and hip hop soul dominating the charts then, Eastmond, along with Warwick's oldest son David Elliott, envisioned to "throw a little hop hop" into what they were planning to record with the singer.

Friends Can Be Lovers marked Warwick's first collaboration with both Elliott and her cousin, singer Whitney Houston, who contributed vocals to the duet song "Love Will Find a Way." Davis also arranged for Warwick to record with English singer Lisa Stansfield, who co-wrote the album's title track along with her former bandmates from Blue Zone. Warwick herself reached out to composer Burt Bacharach and his former lyricst Hal David to reunite with her on the record. Bacharach had discovered Warwick in 1961 and, along with David, penned most of her hit singles until 1972 when the duo decided that they would discontinue writing material together. "Sunny Weather Love" marked their first collaboration in twenty years. Frequent collaborator Luther Vandross served as a backing vocalist on the Sting cover "Fragile."

== Critical reception ==
Professional ratings
Review scores
Source	Rating
AllMusic	3/5 stars
Encyclopedia of Popular Music	3/5 stars
Entertainment Weekly	B
Los Angeles Times	2/4 stars
Philadelphia Inquirer	2.5/4 stars
Rolling Stone Album Guide	2.5/5 stars
Select	2/5 medals
USA Today	3/4 stars

Friends Can Be Lovers was released to mixed to positive reception from music critics. Bil Carpenter from AllMusic called Friends Can Be Lovers "certainly one of her best-produced, best-sung and well-packaged albums since joining the Arista roster." He found that "Here lies the pleasant balance between Dionnesque pop anthems ("Age of Miracles" and "I Sing at Dawn"), ballads (Sting's "Fragile" and a duet with Whitney Houston on "Love Will Find a Way"), down-right funk on "Much Too Much" and shameless lust on "Where My Lips Have Been"." Janine McAdams from Billboard remarked that fans of the singer may find the album "a pleasant surprise" and complimented Warwick for her selection of collaborators on it, writing: "Warwick has found the right package of contemporary songs to set off her throaty purr."

Her colleague, Billboard writer Paul Verna, named Friends Can Be Lovers "a sterling set of R&B-spiced pop ballads" and cited single "Sunny Weather Love," Warwick's duet with Houston and Stansfield's title track as highlights on the album. He, though, found that the remainder of the album was "equally potent." Entertainment Weekly's Amy Linden was unimpressed by "Sunny Weather Love," but liked Stansfield's contributions to the album "whose sexy, grown-up grooves fit Dionne Warwick's burnt-umber pop stylings like a glove on Friends Can Be Lovers." In a positive review, The Indianapolis Star wrote that "the combination of covers and new material, with greatly varied influences, all distills into comfortable, vintage Dionne Warwick. Warwick is able particularly with the Bacharach–David revisitation to bring us music that seems instantly familiar and so easy to listen to." Don Heckman from Los Angeles Times criticized the album overall, concluding that "too much of the collection is dominated by repetitious dance rhythms."

== Commercial performance ==
The album debuted and peaked at number 84 on the US Top R&B/Hip-Hop Albums in the week ending February 13, 1993. This marked Warwick's lowest peak for a regular studio album with all-original material since Love at First Sight (1977), her final album with Warner Bros. Records. Friends Can Be Lovers failed to chart elsewhere, also becoming her first album in 16 years to miss the US Billboard 200. In her 2011 autobiography My Life, As I See It, Warwick revealed that she "hated this project" and "did not feel the songs or production met the standards [she] was accustomed to." Particularly critical with the song "Where My Lips Have Been," Warwick wrote that "it was a lot – not a little – outside of the messages I was known to deliver lyrically, and I think it tested me to the brink."

== Track listing ==
Friends Can Be Lovers track listing
No.	Title	Writer(s)	Producer(s)	Length
1.	"Sunny Weather Love"	Burt Bacharach; Hal David	Barry J. Eastmond; Bacharach	4:09
2.	"Age of Miracles"	Frank Musker; Richard Kerr	Eastmond	4:41
3.	"Where My Lips Have Been"	Robert Charles Burns; Sandy Knox; Don Huber	Eastmond	4:35
4.	"Friends Can Be Lovers"	Lisa Stansfield; Ian Devaney; Andy Morris	Devaney; Morris	5:28
5.	"Love Will Find a Way" (duet with Whitney Houston)	David L. Elliott; Terry Steele	Elliott; Steele^{[A]}	4:56
6.	"Much Too Much"	Diane Warren	Devaney; Morris	4:29
7.	"Til the End of Time"	Elliott; Eastmond; Steele	Eastmond; Vincent Herbert^{[B]}	5:11
8.	"The Woman That I Am"	Eastmond; Siedah Garrett	Eastmond	4:35
9.	"Fragile"	Sting	Harvey Mason; Dionne Warwick	4:09
10.	"I Sing at Dawn"	Tokiko Iwatani; Warwick; Taku Izumi	Masaki Kubo; Joe Kloess^{[A]}; Rob Shrock^{[A]}	4:27

Déjà Vu – The Arista Recordings (2020) bonus tracks
No.	Title	Writer(s)	Producer(s)	Length
11.	"A True Love" (featuring Sacha Distel)	Warwick; Distel; Pierre Grosz	Grosz	3:18
12.	"Who's Counting Heartaches" (duet with Johnny Mathis)	Ina Wolf; Peter Wolf	Sergio Mendes	4:19
13.	"I Don't Need Another Love" (with The Spinners)	Michael Sutton; Brenda Sutton	Nick Martinelli	4:09

Notes

- ^{^[A]} denotes associate producer
- ^{^[B]} denotes assistant producer

== Personnel and credits ==
Musicians

- Dionne Warwick – lead vocals, backing vocals (1, 4, 6, 7, 9, 10)
- Burt Bacharach – synthesizers (1)
- Michael Boddicker – synthesizers (1)
- Barry J. Eastmond – synthesizers (1), keyboards (2, 3, 7, 8)
- Randy Kerber – keyboards (1), acoustic piano (9), Rhodes electric piano (9)
- Eric Rehl – keyboards (2, 3, 8), synthesizer programming (2, 3, 8)
- Richard Tee – acoustic piano (2)
- Ian Devaney – keyboards (4, 6), guitars (6)
- Andy Morris – keyboards (4, 6), flugelhorns (4)
- David Elliott – all instruments (5), strings (5)
- Robert Wechsler – Synclavier programming (5)
- Kayama Griffin – keyboards (7)
- Harvey Mason Jr. – synthesizer programming (9), synth bass (9), drums (9), percussion (9) percussion programming (9)
- Bob James – synth strings (9)
- Joe Kloess – keyboards (10)
- Rob Shrock – keyboards (10), drum programming (10)
- Dean Parks – guitars (1)
- Ira Siegel – guitars (2, 3)
- Paul Jackson, Jr. – guitars (5)
- Doc Powell – guitars (7)
- David Williams – guitars (9)
- Anthony Jackson – bass (1, 8)
- Will Lee – bass (2)
- Freddie Washington – electric bass (9)
- Wade Short – bass (10)
- Sammy Merendino – drum programming (1–3)
- Ike Lee – drum programming (7)
- Buddy Williams – drums (8)
- Everette Harp – alto saxophone (3)
- Chris "Snake" Davis – flutes (4), saxophones (4)
- Roger Byam – soprano saxophone (8)
- Stephen Gibson – flugelhorns (4)
- Georgia Boyd – strings (4)
- Rebecca Gilliver – strings (4)
- Drusilla Harris – strings (4)
- Andrew Long – strings (4)
- Jane Nossek – strings (4)
- Simon Vance – strings (4)
- Paul Loomis – strings (5)
- Gayle Levant – harp (9)
- Susie Katayama – strings (10)
- Curtis King – backing vocals (1, 2)
- Yolanda Lee – backing vocals (1–3, 7, 8)
- Dolette McDonald – backing vocals (1, 2)
- Lisa Stansfield – backing vocals (4, 6)
- Whitney Houston – lead vocals (5)
- Alex Brown – backing vocals (5)
- Alfie Silas – backing vocals (5)
- Terry Steele – backing vocals (5)
- Will Downing – backing vocals (7)
- Audrey Wheeler – backing vocals (7)
- Tawatha Agee – backing vocals (9)
- Lisa Fischer – backing vocals (9)
- Brenda King – backing vocals (9)
- Darlene Love – backing vocals (9)
- Luther Vandross – backing vocals (9)

Music arrangements

- Burt Bacharach – arrangements (1)
- Barry J. Eastmond – arrangements (1–3, 7, 8)
- Ian Devaney – arrangements (4, 6)
- Andy Morris – arrangements (4, 6)
- Chris "Snake" Davis – additional horn arrangements (4)
- Simon Vance – additional string arrangements (4)
- Lisa Stansfield – vocal arrangements (4, 6)
- Dionne Warwick – vocal arrangements (4, 6)
- David Elliot – arrangements (5), string arrangements (5), lead vocal arrangements (5)
- Paul Loomis – string arrangements (5)
- Jeremy Lubbock – French horn and oboe arrangements (5)
- Terry Steele – lead vocal arrangements (5)
- David Foster – rhythm arrangements (9)
- Harvey Mason Jr. – rhythm arrangements (9)
- Bob James – string arrangements (9)
- Luther Vandross – BGV arrangements (9)
- Joe Kloess – arrangements (10)
- Rob Shrock – arrangements (10)

Production

- Clive Davis – executive producer
- Jules Chaikin – music contractor (5)
- Maude Gilman – art direction
- Dave Vance – photography
- G.M.I. – management

Technical credits

- Earl Cohen – engineer (1–3, 8)
- Michael C. Ross – engineer (1–3, 9)
- Ray Bardani – mixing (1–3, 8)
- Joe Schiff – engineer (3, 7, 8)
- Bobby Boughton – recording (4, 6), mixing (4, 6)
- Ian Devaney – mixing (4, 6)
- Andy Morris – mixing (4, 6)
- Barney Perkins – engineer (5), mixing (5)
- Scott Weatherspoon – recording (5)
- Phil Castellano – engineer (7)
- Alec Head – engineer (7)
- Mark Partis – engineer (7)
- Goh Hotoda – mixing (7)
- Mick Guzauski – engineer (9)
- Dave Jenkins – engineer (9)
- Bill Schnee – mixing (9)
- David Apelt – engineer (10), mixing (10)
- Rob Shrock – engineer (10)
- Dionne Warwick – mixing (10)
- Don Mack – assistant engineer (1)
- Michael Rodriguez – assistant engineer (1)
- Todd Childress – mix assistant (1–3, 8), assistant engineer (7)
- Tina Antoine – assistant engineer (5), mix assistant (5)
- Milton Chan – assistant engineer (5), mix assistant (5)
- Bill Malina – recording assistant (5)
- Rich July – mix assistant (7)

== Charts ==
Chart (1993)	Peak position
Australian Albums (ARIA)	193
US Top R&B/Hip-Hop Albums (Billboard)	84
