= Never Let Her Go =

Studio album by David Gates
- Released: January 1975
- Studio: Elektra, Los Angeles, California
- Genre: Soft rock
- Length: 27:09
- Label: Elektra, Wounded Bird Records
- Producer: David Gates, Larry Knechtel

David Gates chronology
First (1973)	Never Let Her Go (1975)	Goodbye Girl (1978)

Singles from Never Let Her Go
- 1. "Never Let Her Go" Released: 1974; 2. "Part Time Love" Released: April 1975; 3. "Someday" Released: 1975

Never Let Her Go is the second solo album by David Gates of the American soft rock band Bread.

== Track listing ==
All songs written and arranged by David Gates.

1. "Never Let Her Go" – 03:09
2. "Angel" – 2:28
3. "Playin' on My Guitar" – 2:47
4. "Watch Out" – 2:05
5. "Part Time Love" – 2:23
6. "Chain Me" – 1:57
7. "Light of My Life" – 2:18
8. "Someday" – 2:02
9. "Greener Days" – 3:36
10. "Strangers" – 4:02

== Personnel ==
- David Gates - Guitar, Bass, Vocals
- Larry Knechtel - Keyboards, Bass
- Mike Botts - Drums
