= Boys Don't Cry (Rumer album) =

Studio album by Rumer
- Released: 28 May 2012
- Recorded: 2010–2012
- Genres: Pop, soul
- Label: Atlantic
- Producer: Steve Brown

Rumer chronology
Seasons of My Soul (2010)	Boys Don't Cry (2012)	Into Colour (2014)

Singles from Boys Don't Cry
- 1. "P.F. Sloan" Released: 4 May 2012; 2. "Sara Smile" Released: 30 July 2012

Boys Don't Cry is the second album by Rumer, produced by Steve Brown. It was released on 28 May 2012. The album is a selection of songs by artist/writers from the 1970s period. Rumer covers works by male artists such as Jimmy Webb, Todd Rundgren, Terry Reid, Tim Hardin, Richie Havens, Gilbert O'Sullivan and others.

== Reception ==
Professional ratings
Aggregate scores
Source	Rating
Metacritic	69/100
Review scores
Source	Rating
AllMusic	4/5 stars
The Independent	4/5 stars
Los Angeles Times	2.5/5 stars

Kitty Empire writing in The Observer praised the album - "it really does sound like another season in her soul" and called "Home Thoughts From Abroad" (by Clifford T. Ward) "the unexpected standout track."

== Singles ==
- "P.F. Sloan" was the first single released from the album, it was released on 4 May 2012.

== Track listing ==
No.	Title	Writer(s)	Length
1.	"P.F. Sloan"	Jimmy Webb	4:10
2.	"It Could be the First Day"	Richie Havens	2:27
3.	"Be Nice to Me"	Todd Rundgren	3:27
4.	"Travelin' Boy"	Paul Williams, Roger Nichols	3:20
5.	"Soulsville"	Isaac Hayes	3:46
6.	"The Same Old Tears On a New Background"	Stephen Bishop	2:50
7.	"Sara Smile"	Daryl Hall, John Oates	3:33
8.	"Flyin' Shoes"	Townes Van Zandt	4:04
9.	"Home Thoughts From Abroad"	Clifford T. Ward	3:27
10.	"Just For a Moment"	Ronnie Lane	2:39
11.	"Brave Awakening"	Terry Reid	4:10
12.	"We Will"	Gilbert O'Sullivan	4:00

Special Edition
No.	Title	Writer(s)	Length
13.	"Andre Johray"	Tim Hardin	2:54
14.	"Soul Rebel"	Bob Marley	3:33
15.	"My Cricket"	Leon Russell	2:50
16.	"A Man Needs a Maid"	Neil Young	3:59

Note that the track listing on the U.S. version is different and that the song "Andre Johray" by Tim Hardin is not included at all. Instead it includes the song "Welcome Back" by John Sebastian.

== Charts ==
=== Weekly charts ===
Chart (2012)	Peak position
Belgian Albums (Ultratop Flanders)	42
Belgian Albums (Ultratop Wallonia)	54
Dutch Albums (Album Top 100)	22
Finnish Albums (Suomen virallinen lista)	48
German Albums (Offizielle Top 100)	48
Irish Albums (IRMA)	8
Japanese Albums (Oricon)	57
Scottish Albums (Official Charts)	3
Swiss Albums (Schweizer Hitparade)	30
UK Albums (Official Charts)	3

=== Year-end charts ===
Chart (2012)	Position
UK Albums (OCC)	116

== Certifications ==
Region	Certification	Certified units/sales
United Kingdom (BPI)	Gold	100,000^{^}
^{^} Shipments figures based on certification alone.

== Release history ==
Region	Date	Format	Label
United Kingdom	28 May 2012	CD, Digital Download	Atlantic records
