= Took the Last Train =

Single by David Gates

from the album Goodbye Girl
- B-side: "Ann"
- Released: August 1978
- Genre: Soft rock
- Length: 4:32
- Label: Elektra
- Songwriter(s): David Gates, Larry Knechtel
- Producer(s): David Gates

David Gates singles chronology
"Goodbye Girl" (1977)	"Took the Last Train" (1978)	"Where Does the Lovin' Go" (1980)

"Took the Last Train" is a song by David Gates, lead singer of the band Bread, which was released as a single in 1978 following the premiere of the hit film The Goodbye Girl. It was the follow-up single to the title track hit song from the album of the same name.

The song contains French lyrics, which are then followed by the translation in English. The 'last train' goes to St-Tropez, a town on the French Riviera.

"Took the Last Train" reached number 30 in the U.S., on both the Billboard Hot 100 and Cash Box Top 100. It peaked at number 7 for three weeks on the Adult Contemporary chart. The song was similarly successful in Canada.

== Personnel ==
- David Gates - vocals, bass
- Dean Parks - guitar
- Larry Knechtel - piano, synthesizer
- Jim Horn - alto saxophone
- Mike Botts - drums

== Chart performance ==
=== Weekly singles charts ===
Chart (1978)	Peak position
Canada RPM Top Singles	29
Canada RPM Adult Contemporary	11
U.S. Billboard Hot 100	30
U.S. Billboard Hot Adult Contemporary Tracks	7
U.S. Cash Box Top 100	30

=== Year-end charts ===
Chart (1978)	Rank
U.S. Billboard Hot 100	181
