= Slow (Rumer song) =

2010 single by Rumer

Single by Rumer

from the album Seasons of My Soul
- Released: 23 August 2010
- Recorded: 2010
- Genre: Pop, soul
- Length: 3:22
- Label: Atlantic
- Songwriter(s): Sarah Joyce

Rumer singles chronology
"Remember (Christmas)" (2007)	"Slow" (2010)	"Aretha" (2010)

"Slow" is a song by British female singer-songwriter Rumer. It is the first single released from her debut album Seasons of My Soul; it reached number 16 on the UK Singles Chart and number 33 on the Irish Singles Chart. The song was record of the week on BBC Radio 2 and Smooth FM. A music video was made for the song and was added to YouTube on 28 July 2010. The video was shot in a recording studio.

== Track listings ==
CD single
No.	Title	Length
1.	"Slow"	3:32

iTunes EP
No.	Title	Length
1.	"Slow"	3:32
2.	"Healer"	3:13
3.	"The Moon's a Harsh Mistress"	2:54
4.	"Slow" (Music video)	3:41
5.	"An Introduction to Rumer" (Video)	6:48

== Chart performance ==
"Slow" debuted on the UK Singles Chart at number 16 on 15 September 2010, in its second week it dropped to number 31 and dropped out of the Top 40 in its third week. The single also peaked at number 33 on the Irish Singles Chart and number three on the Japan Hot 100.

=== Weekly charts ===
Chart (2010–2011)	Peak position
Belgium (Ultratop 50 Wallonia)	55
Ireland (IRMA)	33
Japan (Japan Hot 100)	3
Netherlands (Single Top 100)	61
Scotland (OCC)	25
UK Singles (OCC)	16

=== Year-end charts ===
Chart (2011)	Position
Japan (Japan Hot 100)	93

== Release history ==
Region	Date	Format	Label
United Kingdom	30 July 2010	Digital download	Atlantic
United Kingdom	23 August 2010	CD single	Atlantic
Germany	11 February 2011	CD single	Warner Music International
