= Aretha (song) =

Single by Rumer

from the album Seasons of My Soul
- Released: 25 October 2010
- Recorded: 2010
- Genre: Soul; easy listening
- Length: 3:22
- Label: Atlantic
- Songwriters: Steve Brown; Sarah Joyce

Rumer singles chronology
"Slow" (2010)	"Aretha" (2010)	"Am I Forgiven" (2011)

"Aretha" is a song by British singer-songwriter Rumer. Produced by award-winning UK TV and musical composer Steve Brown, it is the second single to be released from her debut album Seasons of My Soul. A music video was made for the song and was added to YouTube on 6 October 2010. The song has been added to the BBC Radio 2 A-List.

== Background ==
In an interview with Digital Spy she was asked to describe her single:

"It's a very soulful ballad about a little girl who goes to school listening to Aretha Franklin on her headphones. She's having trouble at school and her mother's suffering from mental illness and she hasn't got anyone to talk to, but Aretha Franklin comes to life and encourages her and speaks to her through her imagination."

She was also asked why she chose Aretha Franklin:

"She's the Queen of Soul! If you're going to write about somebody who embodies the spirit of music itself you go to the top of the list - and there she is! Her voice is probably the closest you get to God. There's an incredible amount of passion and heartbreak in her voice as she's lost a lot of family members. She's just got something in her voice that puts her at the top of the tree and there's no negotiation."

== Critical reception ==
Robert Copsey of Digital Spy described some lines as "unnvervingly honest" sung with Rumer's "smouldering tones".

== Track listings ==
CD single
No.	Title	Length
1.	"Aretha"	3:15
2.	"The Warmth of the Sun"	3:22
3.	"Come Saturday Morning"	3:16

iTunes EP
No.	Title	Length
1.	"Aretha"	3:15
2.	"The Warmth of the Sun"	3:22
3.	"Come Saturday Morning"	3:16
4.	"Aretha" (Music video)	3:17

== Chart performance ==
"Aretha" debuted on the UK Singles Chart at number 72 on 31 October 2010. It also entered the Dutch Singles Chart at number 47 on 19 March 2011.

Chart (2010–11)	Peak position
Netherlands (Single Top 100)	47
UK Singles (OCC)	72

== Release history ==
Region	Date	Format	Label
United Kingdom	24 October 2010	Digital download	Atlantic
United Kingdom	25 October 2010	CD single	Atlantic
