= Where My Lips Have Been =

Single by Dionne Warwick

from the album Friends Can Be Lovers
- Released: June 1993
- Length: 4:35
- Label: Arista
- Songwriters: Robert Charles Burns; Sandy Knox; Don Huber
- Producer: Barry Eastmond

Dionne Warwick singles chronology
| "Sunny Weather Love" (1993) | "Where My Lips Have Been" (1993) | "Friends Can Be Lovers" (1993) |

"Where My Lips Have Been" is a song recorded by American singer Dionne Warwick. It was written by Robert Charles Burns, Sandy Knox, and Don Huber for her studio album Friends Can Be Lovers (1993), while production was helmed by Barry Eastmond. The sensual, downtempo ballad was released as the album's second single in 1993, and peaked at number 95 on the US Hot R&B/Hip-Hop Songs chart.

== Background ==
"Where My Lips Have Been" was written by Robert Charles Burns, Sandy Knox, and Don Huber and produced by Barry Eastmond for Warwick's tenth album with Arista Records, Friends Can Be Lovers (1993). The sensual, downtempo ballad features Everette Harp on the saxophone. In her 2011 autobiography My Life, As I See It, Warwick revealed her discontent with the song and its parent album, writing: "I hated this project. I did not feel the songs or production met the standards I was accustomed to. The one song that I still feel uncomfortable even mentioning is "Where My Lips Have Been." It was a lot – not a little – outside of the messages I was known to deliver lyrically, and I think it tested me to the brink."

== Track listings ==
Cassette single
| No. | Title | Writer(s) | Producer(s) | Length |
|---|---|---|---|---|
| 1. | "Where My Lips Have Been" | Robert Charles Burns; Sandy Knox; Don Huber | Eastmond | 4:35 |
| 2. | "Fragile" | Sting | Harvey Mason; Dionne Warwick | 4:09 |

== Credits and personnel ==
Credits lifted from the liner notes of Friends Can Be Lovers.

- Ray Bardani – mixing
- Robert Charles Burns – writer
- Todd Childress – mixing assistance
- Earl Cohen – engineer
- Barry Eastmond – arranger, keyboards, producer
- Everette Harp – alto sax
- Don Huber – writer
- Sandy Knox – writer
- Yolanda Lee – background vocals
- Sammy Merendino – drum programming
- Eric Rehl – keyboards, keyboard programming
- Mike Ross – engineer
- Joe Schiff – engineer
- Ira Siegel – guitar
- Dionne Warwick – vocals

== Charts ==
| Chart (1993) | Peak position |
|---|---|
| US Hot R&B/Hip-Hop Songs (Billboard) | 95 |
