= Aquarela do Brasil (album) =

Studio album by Dionne Warwick
- Released: October 18, 1994
- Length: 91:05
- Label: Arista
- Producer: Téo Lima

Dionne Warwick chronology
Friends Can Be Lovers (1993)	Aquarela do Brasil (1994)	Dionne Sings Dionne (1998)

Singles from Aquarela do Brasil
- 1. "Captives of the Heart" Released: 1994

Aquarela do Brasil is a studio album by American singer Dionne Warwick. It was released by Arista Records on October 18, 1994, in the United States. A collection of Brazilian jazz and pop tunes, ranging from bossa nova to samba, the album consists of original songs as well as several cover versions, including standards such as "Caravan" and its title track. Warwick paired herself with Téo Lima to produce the entire album which was recorded in Brazil and Los Angeles, involving help from Dori Caymmi, Oscar Castro-Neves, Brenda Russell, and Patrick Williams, among others.

== Background ==
In 1993, Arista Records released Warwick's Friends Can Be Lovers, her tenth album with the label. A commercial flop, it reached number 82 on the US Top R&B/Hip-Hop Albums only. The same year, Warwick bought an old Spanishstyle castle in Bahia in the northeast of Brazil and began recording her next project, a collection of Brazilian jazz and pop tunes, with producer Téo Lima. Unlike her previous project, which she "hated," Warwick enjoyed the album recordings for Aquarela do Brasil, during which she was coached by her background singer Eliana Estevao in Portuguese pronunciation. While the rhythm tracks and vocals were in finished in Brazil, Lima flew to Los Angeles where the strings, horns, and backgrounds were recorded and arrangers Dori Caymmi, Oscar Castro-Neves, Brenda Russell, and Patrick Williams joined the team.

== Critical reception ==
Professional ratings
Review scores
Source	Rating
Allmusic	3/5 stars
Rolling Stone Album Guide	3/5 stars

Allmusic wrote that "wisely downplaying the overexposed standards, Warwick sings, in both English and Portuguese, with just the right amount of swing and ease. The gorgeous title track is a sublime highlight, as is an intriguing cover of Juan Tizol and Duke Ellington's massively influential "Caravan." The arrangements are a little fussy at times, but overall, this is one of the best Brazilian crossover discs of its era." The St. Louis Post-Dispatch called Aquarela do Brasil "Warwick's musical statement for the '90s. Who would have expected she could pull off such a diverse piece of work after making a career out of middle-of-the-road pop ballads [...]." The Rolling Stone Album Guide found that Aquarela do Brasil turns Warwick "loose on an excellent, and apt, set of bossa nova tunes."

== Commercial performance ==
Aquarela do Brasil failed to chart or sell noticeably and became Warwick's first album since Love at First Sight (1977), her final album with Warner Bros. Records, to miss any Billboard chart. Disappointed with its commercial performance, Warwick attributed its low sales to Arista Records' promotion team and label head Clive Davis' lack of support. In her 2011 autobiography My Life, As I See It, Warwick wrote that she regretted not having played a larger part in the promotion of Aquarela do Brasil. With Arista going through internal changes then, she left the label shortly after the release of the album, making it her final project with Davis.

== Track listing ==
All tracks produced by Teo Lima. Credits lifted from the liner notes of Aquarela do Brasil.

No.	Title	Writer(s)	Length
1.	"Jobim Medley"	Antônio Carlos Jobim; Chico Buarque; Gene Lees; Norman Gimbel; Vinicius de Moraes	5:52
2.	"Virou Areia"	Braulio Tavares; Dionne Warwick; Lenine	4:13
3.	"Oh Bahia"	Ary Barroso; Warwick; Ray Gilbert	5:25
4.	"Piano Na Mangueira"	Jobim; Buarque	2:48
5.	"Captives of the Heart"	Burt Bacharach; John Bettis	4:48
6.	"Samba Dobrado"	Warwick; Djavan	4:22
7.	"Heart of Brazil"	Antonio Adolfo; Marietta Waters; Nelson Wellington	4:37
8.	"Afrika"/"So Bashiya Bahlala Ekhaya"	Amandla; Enoch Sontonga	3:48
9.	"Brazil (Aquarela Do Brasil)"	Ary Barroso; Bob Russell	3:59
10.	"Caravan"	Duke Ellington; Irving Mills; Juan Tizol	3:55
11.	"Flower of Bahia"	Dori Caymmi; Paulo César Pinheiro; Tracy Mann	4:16
12.	"10,000 Words"	Brenda Russell; Joe Turano	4:26

Déjà Vu – The Arista Recordings (2020) bonus tracks
No.	Title	Length
13.	"To Say Goodbye" (featuring Edu Lobo)	4:20
14.	"Love Me"	4:40
15.	"Lullaby"	4:32
16.	"Bridges (Travessia)"	4:11
17.	"Rainy Day Girl" (featuring Ivan Lins)	4:13

Notes

- "Jobim Medley" consists of "Retrato Em Branco E Preto" / "How Insensitive", "Quiet Nights Of Quiet Stars", "Wave", and "Waters of March"
- All Déjà Vu – The Arista Recordings (2020) bonus tracks had previously been released on Warwick's Tropical Love EP (2015).

== Charts ==
Chart (1995)	Peak position
Australian Albums (ARIA)	122
