= Into Colour =

Studio album by Rumer
- Released: 10 November 2014
- Recorded: 2013–2014
- Genre: Soul, easy listening
- Length: 44:42
- Label: Atlantic Records
- Producer: Rob Shirakbari

Rumer chronology
Boys Don't Cry (2012)	Into Colour (2014)	This Girl's in Love (2016)

'Into Colour' is the third album by the British singer-songwriter Rumer. It was released on 10 November 2014.

== Singles ==
- "Dangerous" was the first single released from the album.
- Billboard premiered "Reach Out" in the United States via streaming on 23 January 2015.

== Track listing ==
No.	Title	Writer(s)	Length
1.	"Intro (Return of Blackbird)"	Sarah Joyce / Rob Shirakbari / Rick Nowels / Stephen Bishop	1:28
2.	"Dangerous"	Joyce / Shirakbari / Nowels / Bishop / Sophie Delila	3:56
3.	"Reach Out"	Joyce / Shirakbari	3:53
4.	"You Just Don't Know People"	Joyce / Shirakbari	5:17
5.	"Baby, Come Back to Bed"	Joyce / Bishop / Shirakbari	4:10
6.	"Play Your Guitar"	Joyce / Shirakbari / Nowels	4:07
7.	"Sam"	Joyce / Bishop	4:39
8.	"Better Place"	Joyce / Shirakbari	3:38
9.	"Pizza and Pinball"	Joyce / Bernardy / Shirakbari	4:56
10.	"Butterfly"	Joyce / Shirakbari	3:50
11.	"I Am Blessed"	Joyce / Shirakbari / Blackman	4:48

Professional ratings
Aggregate scores
Source	Rating
Metacritic	76/100
Review scores
Source	Rating
Allmusic	4/5 stars
The Daily Telegraph	4/5 stars
Drowned in Sound	6/10
The Guardian	4/5 stars
Hot Press	2.5/5
The Irish Times	4/5 stars
musicOMH	3/5 stars
The Observer	2/5 stars
Popmatters	8/10 stars
Q	4/5 stars

== Charts ==
Chart (2014–15)	Peak position
Belgian Albums (Ultratop Flanders)	40
Belgian Albums (Ultratop Wallonia)	67
Dutch Albums (Album Top 100)	33
German Albums (Offizielle Top 100)	95
Irish Albums (IRMA)	42
Japanese Albums (Oricon)	77
Scottish Albums (OCC)	19
Swiss Albums (Schweizer Hitparade)	80
UK Albums (OCC)	12

== Release history ==
Region	Date	Format	Label
United Kingdom	10 November 2014	CD, digital download	Atlantic records
