= First (David Gates album) =

Studio album by David Gates
- Released: 1973
- Studio: Elektra, Los Angeles, California
- Genre: Soft rock
- Label: Elektra
- Producer: David Gates

David Gates chronology
First (1973)	Never Let Her Go (1975)

Singles from First
- 1. "Suite: Clouds, Rain" Released: April 1973

Professional ratings
Review scores
Source	Rating
AllMusic	2/5 stars
The Encyclopedia of Popular Music	2/5 stars
The New Rolling Stone Record Guide	2/5 stars

First is the debut solo album by David Gates, released in 1973.

Musicians who appear on the album include Larry Knechtel, Mike Botts, Jimmy Getzoff, Jim Gordon, Jim Horn, John Guerin, Larry Carlton, Louie Shelton, and Russ Kunkel.

== Critical reception ==
The New Rolling Stone Record Guide wrote: "Above all, Gates displays a concern for lyrics and melody (indeed, for song structure) that is nothing if not admirable and praiseworthy. But he can also be totally insipid: side two of First is an emotional wasteland." In The Pittsburgh Press, critic Pete Bishop said that the album's "easy-on-the-ear songs...will please any who liked that sound [of Bread (band)] the first time around."

== Track listing ==
All tracks composed and arranged by David Gates.

1. "Sail Around the World"
2. "Sunday Rider"
3. "Soap (I Use The)"
4. "Suite: Clouds, Rain"
5. "Help Is on the Way"
6. "Ann"
7. "Do You Believe He's Comin'"
8. "Sight and Sound"
9. "Lorilee"

== Personnel ==
- David Gates - guitar, vocals, composer, producer, arranger
- James Getzoff - strings
- Jim Gordon - drums
- Jim Horn - saxophone
- John Guerin - drums
- Larry Carlton - guitar
- Larry Knechtel - bass guitar, keyboards, associate producer
- Louie Shelton - guitar
- Mike Botts - drums
- Russ Kunkel - drums

Technical

- Armin Steiner, Bruce Morgan - engineer
- Robert L. Heimall - cover design
- Frank Bez - front cover photography
