= One Amazing Night =

One Amazing Night is a 1998 live tribute show performed by artists such as Dionne Warwick, Elvis Costello, Luther Vandross, Sheryl Crow and others to honor the music of Burt Bacharach. It was recorded live at the Hammerstein Ballroom, New York City with Bacharach himself conducting the orchestra and playing the piano. It was initially released on CD and VHS only, but in 2002, a DVD was released. There were some differences in the track listing; song order was changed. The song "This House Is Empty Now" performed by Elvis Costello is substituted for his performance of "God Give Me Strength" featured on the CD and was released digitally.

== Track listings ==
=== CD ===
1. Sheryl Crow - "One Less Bell to Answer"
2. All Saints - "Always Something There to Remind Me"
3. Elvis Costello - "God Give Me Strength"
4. Chrissie Hynde - "Baby It's You/Message to Michael"
5. Mike Myers - "What's New Pussycat?"
6. Wynonna - "Anyone Who Had a Heart"
7. Ben Folds Five - "Raindrops Keep Fallin' on My Head"
8. Barenaked Ladies - "(They Long to Be) Close to You"
9. Luther Vandross - "The Windows of the World/What The World Needs Now Is Love"
10. David Sanborn & George Duke - "Wives and Lovers"
11. Dionne Warwick - "Walk On By/I Say a Little Prayer/Do You Know the Way to San Jose"
12. Burt Bacharach - "Alfie"

=== DVD ===
1. Sheryl Crow - "One Less Bell to Answer"
2. Ben Folds Five - "Raindrops Keep Fallin' on My Head"
3. All Saints - "Always Something There to Remind Me"
4. Elvis Costello - "This House Is Empty Now/God Give Me Strength"
5. Chrissie Hynde - "Baby It's You/Message to Michael"
6. Mike Myers - "What's New Pussycat?"
7. Wynonna - "Anyone Who Had a Heart"
8. Barenaked Ladies - "(They Long to Be) Close to You"
9. Luther Vandross - "The Windows of the World/What the World Needs Now Is Love"
10. David Sanborn & George Duke - "Wives and Lovers"
11. Dionne Warwick - "Walk On By/I Say a Little Prayer/Do You Know the Way to San Jose"
12. Burt Bacharach - "Alfie"
