= Rumer (musician) =

Pakistani-British singer-songwriter (born 1979)

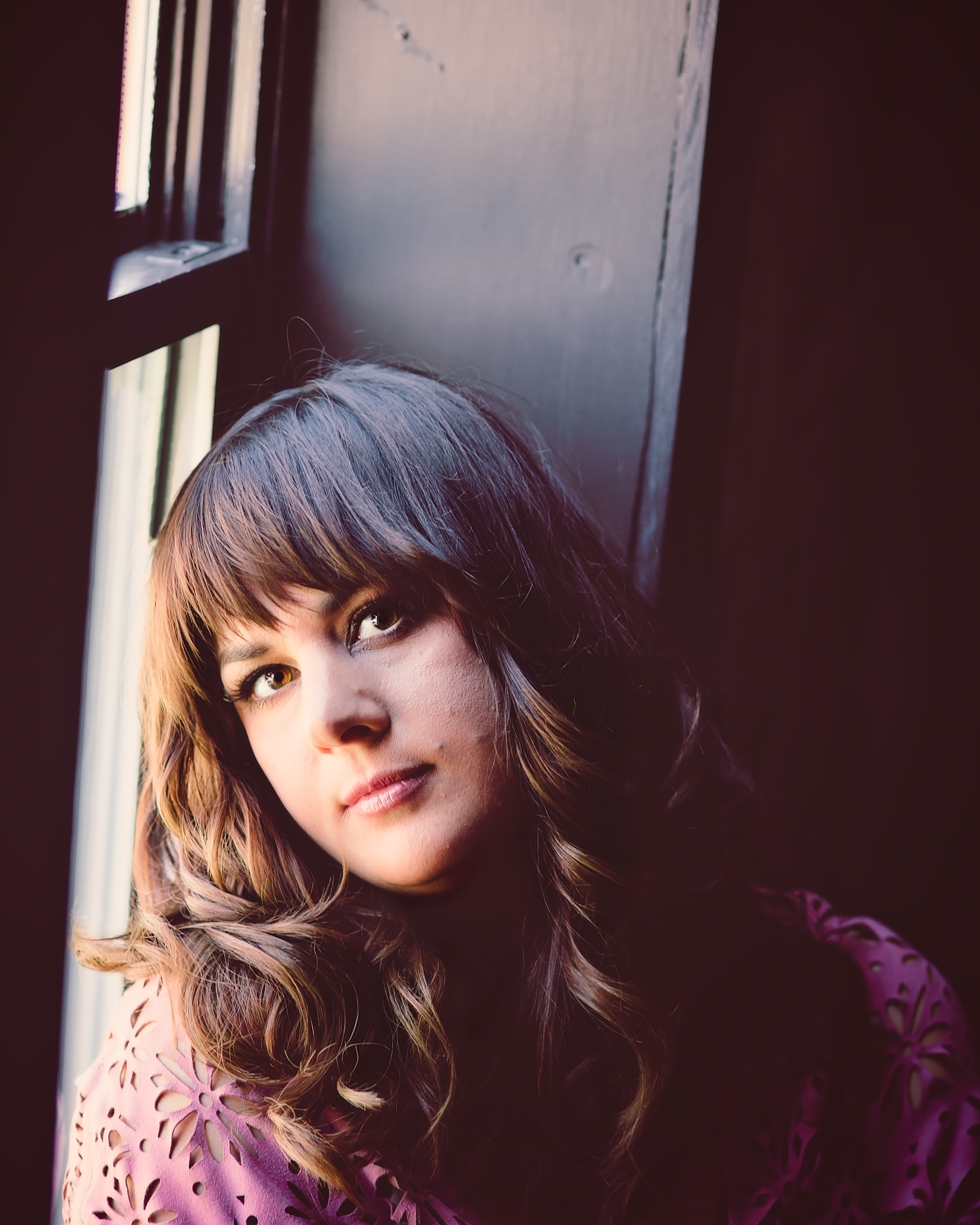
- Rumer in 2014

Background information
- Also known as: Sarah Prentice
- Born: Sarah Joyce; 3 June 1979 (age 47); Tarbela Dam, Pakistan
- Genres: Pop; easy listening; soul
- Occupations: Singer; songwriter
- Instruments: Vocals; guitar
- Years active: 2000–present
- Labels: Atlantic; East West; Warner; Cooking Vinyl
- Website: www.rumer.co.uk

Sarah Joyce (born 3 June 1979), better known by her stage name, Rumer, is a Pakistani-British singer-songwriter. Supported by leading music industry figures including Burt Bacharach, Elton John, Carly Simon, and Jools Holland, Rumer was nominated for two Brit Awards on 13 January 2011.

Her debut album, Seasons of My Soul, released in 2010, peaked on the UK Charts at No. 3, was certified platinum in 2013 having sold over one million copies, and was listed at No. 26 in the Official Top 40 Biggest Debut Albums of the Decade in 2019. Rumer's voice has been described by The Guardian and many others as being reminiscent of Karen Carpenter. Her stage name was inspired by the author Rumer Godden. Boys Don't Cry, released in 2012, peaked on the UK Charts at No. 3. She has performed at several festivals such as Glastonbury Festival. Her album This Girl's in Love (A Bacharach & David Songbook) was released in November 2016. In August 2020, she released her fifth album, Nashville Tears (The Songs of Hugh Prestwood).

== Early life and education ==
Rumer was the seventh of eight children and was born in 1979 in Tarbela Dam, Pakistan. Her family lived there from 1977 to 1984 while her registered British father was contracted as Chief Engineer of the Tarbela Dam Project.

Her parents split, and her Streatham-born mother moved back to England with Rumer and her siblings. Rumer moved to Carlisle aged 11 and attended Newman Catholic School, where she won the school's annual talent show in 1994. Rumer became fascinated with the work of Judy Garland at a young age, and sought solace from difficulties at home and school by listening to artists such as Aretha Franklin, Joni Mitchell and Tracy Chapman. She was encouraged by her musical family, who all played instruments and played in their local Catholic church. This began her interest in becoming a performer.

Rumer later discovered her biological father was the family's Pakistani cook, with whom her mother had had an affair when living in Pakistan. While her mother was dying of breast cancer in 2001, she asked Rumer to make the journey to Pakistan to search for her biological father, with her mother reportedly saying "I want to leave this planet with my house in order". She discovered on arriving he had only recently died in a freak accident.

Rumer briefly attended the drama course at Dartington College of Arts, in Devon before dropping out, moving to London at 18 and getting a job as a waitress.

Born Sarah Joyce, she chose the name Rumer after the author Rumer Godden.

== Musical career ==
=== 2001–2010: La Honda and Stereo Venus ===
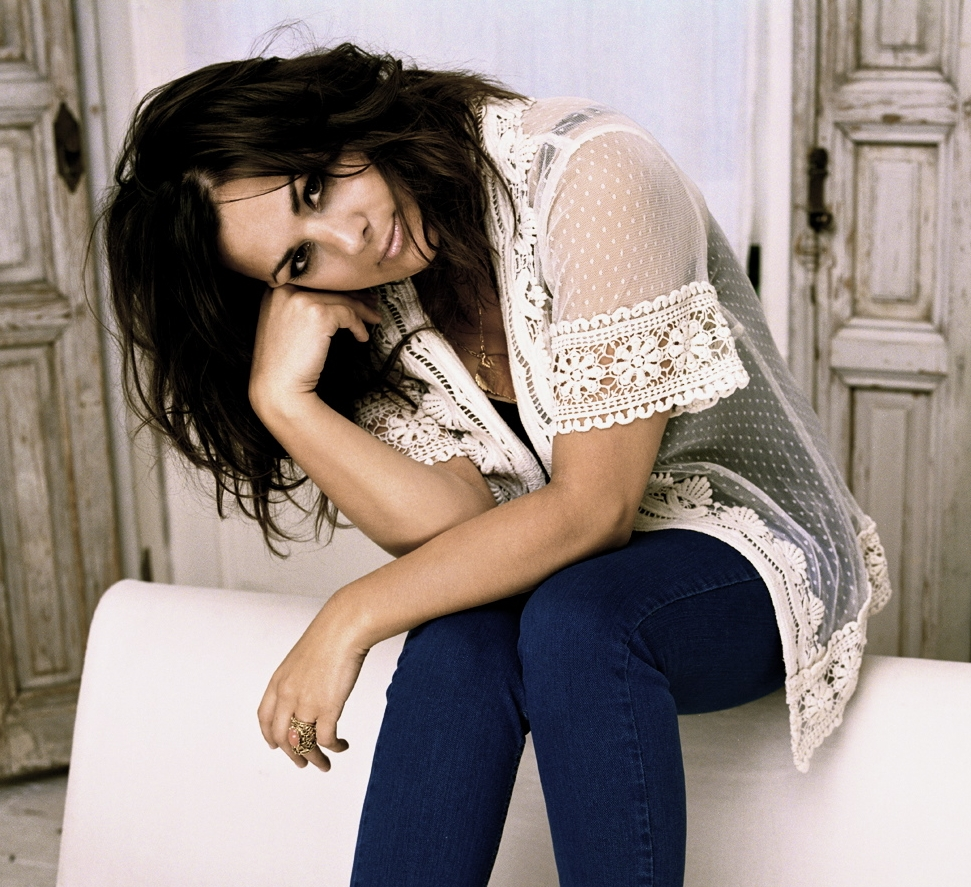
Rumer in 2010

Under the name of Sarah Prentice, Sarah sang with a moderately successful London-based folk/indie band called La Honda between 2000 and 2001. In 2004, she formed the band Rumer & The Denials and released an early version of "Come To Me High" on 7" in 2007. Their Myspace page, now closed, included an acoustic recording of "Slow", which was included on the compilation album A Very Magistery Valentine. A collection of material was recorded in 2008 with Rory Moore under the name Stereo Venus. This was aimed at television and film and was originally distributed in Europe. An album was released in 2012 entitled Close to the Sun and the band played support for Saint Etienne. The material was also released under her real name, Sarah Joyce in South Korea in April 2010 as Coffee And Honey.

=== 2010–2011: Solo career as Rumer, Seasons of My Soul and Rumer Sings Bacharach at Christmas ===
Rumer's debut album Seasons of My Soul was released on 1 November 2010, produced by her mentor, British composer Steve Brown. Her debut single, "Slow", was featured on Smooth FM, and the single "Aretha" on BBC Radio 2's Record of the Week feature, and she is signed to Atlantic Records. Seasons of My Soul, peaked on the UK Charts at No. 3, was listed at No. 26 in the Official Top 40 Biggest Debut Albums of the Decade in 2019, and was certified platinum in 2013 having sold over one million copies. She supported Jools Holland on his UK tour in the Autumn of 2010 which included a performance at the Albert Hall in London.

Rumer received a personal note from Richard Carpenter regarding her debut album, "You not only sing beautifully," writes Carpenter, "but what you've created is actually musical, something that has been in short supply in recent years. The fact that the album is a sales success as well is reassuring to me, as I still firmly believe that if the public is exposed to music that is natural and of high quality, they will respond positively. Congratulations".

After Burt Bacharach invited Rumer to his California home to hear her sing, Atlantic Records released Rumer Sings Bacharach at Christmas on 13 December 2010. It featured "Some Lovers" from the musical Gift of the Magi by Bacharach and Steven Sater. A limited edition 7-inch vinyl version was also released with a cover personally designed by Rumer.

Rumer also contributed to a memorial concert to film composer, John Barry, which took place on 20 June 2011 at the Royal Albert Hall in London where the Royal Philharmonic Orchestra, Dame Shirley Bassey, David Arnold, Wynne Evans, trumpeter Derek Watkins and others performed Barry's music. Rumer performed the John Barry/Hal David song "We Have All the Time in the World" accompanied by the Royal Philharmonic Orchestra conducted by Nicholas Dodd. She recorded the track "I Believe in You" for the end credits to Johnny English Reborn, released in October 2011. In January 2012 she started her first American tour in Los Angeles.

=== 2012–2013: Boys Don't Cry ===
Rumer's second album Boys Don't Cry was released on 28 May 2012. It contains a selection of songs by male artists and writers from the 70s and 80s period. Covers of songs by artists such as Todd Rundgren, Gilbert O'Sullivan, Neil Young and Terry Reid were chosen to mirror the solace and anguish Rumer experienced since achieving success and fame (BBC Music review). The majority of Boys Don't Cry was recorded at the same time as, or before Seasons of My Soul, but two weeks before the deadline Rumer and Steve Brown irreparably fell out. Rumer sought urgent help to finish the record and enlisted family friend Jennie Muskett, a notable film and TV composer to step in and help realise her vision in Steve's absence. A lot of the music had to be re-recorded at RAK Studios with John Paraceli on guitar, Ian Thomas and Steve Pierce on drums and Dave Hartley on piano.

Rumer's version of PF Sloan written by Jimmy Webb was released as a single, followed by a second single written by Hall and Oates, "Sara Smile". She appeared on The Andrew Marr show with Jools Holland at the end of 2012 and performed with Jimmy Webb on CBS Second Cup Cafe in September 2013. Rumer was interviewed on The Graham Norton show and performed PF Sloan, just previous to the release of Boys Don't Cry. Rumer later performed "P.F. Sloan" as a duet with P.F. Sloan on 14 June 2014. Webb invited her to perform the song at Live at MacArthur Park, Los Angeles on 15 June 2013. Webb then invited Rumer to record, Still Within The Sound of My Voice, (written by Jimmy Webb) which was the title track on Webb's album, Still Within the Sound of My Voice which included other guest performances by Keith Urban, Carly Simon, among others, released later in 2013.

=== 2014–2015: Into Colour, B Sides and Rarities and Love is the Answer ===
Rumer released her second album of all original material, and her third total studio album, Into Colour on 10 November 2014 in the UK, Ireland and Japan, peaking at No. 12 on the UK Charts. The record was then released worldwide in early 2015 by Atlantic Records. The first song to be released from the album was "Dangerous", which takes Rumer in a more disco direction. The song was made available on her SoundCloud page in September 2014.

In 2015, Rumer released a collection of unreleased tracks and B-sides from her back catalog entitled, B Sides & Rarities. The collection features collaborations with the likes of Dionne Warwick, Stephen Bishop and Michael Feinstein.

On 11 December 2015, Rumer released a four-track EP entitled Love is the Answer.

=== 2016–2019: This Girl's in Love (A Bacharach and David Songbook) ===
Rumer's fourth album, released under the East West Records label, features Rumer's take on select tracks from the songbook of Burt Bacharach and Hal David. It was released on 25 November 2016. Rumer remarked about how this album "was one she couldn't have made five years ago" and that how she felt that she had the right "emotional palette" to draw on the songs she recorded. It was produced by her husband and producer Rob Shirakbari at Capitol Studios in early 2016. In October, Rumer played her first London gig in over 2 years at London's Cadogan Hall.

Rumer contributed to Trevor Horn's album Reimagines the Eighties, released in January 2019.

=== 2020: Nashville Tears (The Songs of Hugh Prestwood) ===
Rumer released her fifth studio album, and her third album of covers, Nashville Tears (The Songs of Hugh Prestwood), on 14 August 2020. The album, which originally was scheduled for a May 2020 release, was delayed due to the COVID-19 pandemic. Nashville Tears includes covers of songs from singer-songwriter Hugh Prestwood. "Creating this album was the beginning of a joyful time in my life," Rumer explained about the record. "I was listening to Hugh Prestwood's catalog all day and doing the dishes and walking the dog and taking care of my baby. It was a wonderful time....with this record, through Hugh Prestwood's words, I wanted to create a piece of work that would, to me be like a tapestry of America how I felt it and saw it, and I feel like I did just that."

== Television and radio appearances ==
In September 2010, Rumer performed three songs on Later with Jools Holland. She performed with British jazz singer Jamie Cullum in the 2010 Royal Variety Performance. Also in 2010, Elton John invited Rumer to be his special guest at his BBC Electric Proms concert.

On 9 May 2012, Rumer performed at the White House in a tribute concert honouring the songwriting team of Burt Bacharach and Hal David, singing the Bacharach-David song "A House Is Not a Home". She also participated in the finale, "What the World Needs Now Is Love". The concert, Burt Bacharach & Hal David: The Library of Congress Gershwin Prize for Popular Song in Performance at the White House, was broadcast on PBS on 21 May 2012.

On 15 August 2012, Rumer appeared on episode No. 57 of Daryl Hall's webcast 'Live From Daryl's House' where they performed 'Sara Smile' together as well as other songs including 'Take Me As I Am' and 'I Can't Go For That'.

Rumer and her husband Rob Shirakbari recorded two songs for the BBC's Radio 2 from their home in Macon, Georgia while self-isolating during the COVID-19 pandemic. The two live songs "Hard Times for Lovers" and "Aretha" were aired on Ken Bruce the morning of 5 May 2020 along with an interview.

== Personal life ==
In 2010, Rumer began a relationship with Sam Winwood, the son of English songwriter, former member of the Spencer Davis Group and record producer Muff Winwood. The two separated the following year.

Rumer began dating Rob Shirakbari, Burt Bacharach's former musical director, whom she met after moving to Los Angeles following the release of Boys Don't Cry. The pair moved to Shirakbari's home state of Arkansas, and married there in 2015. In an interview she gave to The Independent, she said that following the pressures brought about by the music industry after releasing her debut album, she was diagnosed with bipolar disorder and post-traumatic stress disorder. She also said in the same interview that she had a miscarriage.

== Awards and nominations ==
- 2011: Nominated for the Brit Award for Best British Breakthrough Act and Best British Female Solo Artist
- 2011: Nominated for the UK Asian Music Award for Best Alternative Act and Best Newcomer
- 2011: Won the UK Asian Music Award for Best Alternative Act
- 2011: Nominated for the MOJO Award for Best Breakthrough Act, Best Album with "Seasons of my Soul" and Song of the Year with "Slow"
- 2011: Won the MOJO Award for Best Breakthrough Act

== Discography ==
=== Studio albums ===
Album Title	Album details	Peak chart positions												Sales	Certifications (sales threshold)
Album Title	Album details	UK	AUS	BEL (FLA)	BEL (WAL)	FRA	IRL	NOR	NZ	NL	SWE	SWI	US	Sales	Certifications (sales threshold)
Seasons of My Soul	Released: 1 November 2010; Label: Atlantic; Formats: CD, LP, download	3	35	6	11	34	7	6	10	2	13	15	46	UK: 529,238	UK: 2× Platinum; IRE: Platinum
Boys Don't Cry	Released: 28 May 2012; Label: Atlantic; Formats: CD, LP, download	3	63	42	54	—	8	—	—	22	—	30	—	UK: 100,000+	UK: Gold
Into Colour	Released: 10 November 2014; Label: Atlantic; Formats: CD, LP, download	12	—	40	67	—	42	—	—	33	—	80	—		
This Girl's in Love (A Bacharach & David Songbook)	Released: 25 November 2016; Label: East West, Warner; Formats: CD, LP, download	28	—	87	100	—	66	—	—	—	—	—	—		
Nashville Tears (The Songs of Hugh Prestwood)	Released: 14 August 2020; Label: Cooking Vinyl; Formats: CD, LP, Cassette, download	17	—	—	—	—	—	—	—	—	—	—	—		

=== Live albums ===
Album Title	Album Details	Peak chart positions
Album Title	Album Details	UK
Live from Lafayette	Released: 17 September 2021; Label: Cooking Vinyl; Formats: CD, Vinyl, Digital download	—
In Session	Released: 31 January 2025; Label: Ciancia Management; Formats: CD, Vinyl, Digital download	—

=== Compilation albums ===
Album Title	Album Details	Peak chart positions
Album Title	Album Details	UK
B Sides & Rarities	Released: 4 September 2015; Label: Atlantic Records; Formats: CD, Digital download	97
B Sides & Rarities Vol. 2	Released: 22 April 2022; Label: Atlantic Records; Formats: CD, Digital download	—

=== Extended plays ===
EP Title	EP Details	Peak chart positions
EP Title	EP Details	UK
Rumer Sings Bacharach at Christmas	Released: 10 December 2010; Label: Atlantic Records; Formats: CD, 7" vinyl, Digital download	78
iTunes Festival: London 2011	Released: 20 July 2011; Label: Warner Music; Formats: Digital download	—
Into Colour EP	Released: 6 October 2014; Label: Atlantic Records; Formats: CD, Digital download	—
Love Is The Answer	Released: 11 December 2015; Label: Night Owl Music Ltd; Formats: CD, Digital download	—

=== Singles ===
Year	Single	Peak chart positions					Album
Year	Single	UK	BEL (FLA)	BEL (WAL)	IRL	NL	Album
2007	"Remember (Christmas)"	—	—	—	—	—	Non-album single
2010	"Slow"	16	58	41	33	61	Seasons of My Soul
2010	"Aretha"	72	—	—	—	47	Seasons of My Soul
2011	"Am I Forgiven"	—	78	59	—	—	Seasons of My Soul
2011	"I Believe in You"	—	—	—	—	—	Johnny English Reborn OST
2011	"I Wanna Roo You"	—	135	—	—	—	Non-album single
2012	"P.F. Sloan"	—	73	—	—	—	Boys Don't Cry
2012	"Sara Smile"	—	97	—	—	—	Boys Don't Cry
2014	"Dangerous"	—	—	—	—	—	Into Colour
2014	"Reach Out"	—	—	—	—	—	Into Colour
2016	"Balance of Nature"	—	—	—	—	—	This Girl's in Love (A Bacharach & David Songbook)
2016	"Walk On By"	—	—	—	—	—	This Girl's in Love (A Bacharach & David Songbook)
2016	"What The World Needs Now Is Love"	—	—	—	—	—	This Girl's in Love (A Bacharach & David Songbook)
2020	"Hard Times For Lovers"	—	—	—	—	—	Nashville Tears
2020	"The Fate of Fireflies"	—	—	—	—	—	Nashville Tears
2020	"June It's Gonna Happen"	—	—	—	—	—	Nashville Tears
2020	"Deep Summer In the Deep South"	—	—	—	—	—	Nashville Tears
2022	"Roses"	—	—	—	—	—	B Sides & Rarities Vol. 2
2022	"Old-Fashioned Girl"	—	—	—	—	—	B Sides & Rarities Vol. 2
2023	"Don't Interrupt the Sorrow" (Live Masterlink Sessions) (with Redtenbacher's Funkestra)	—	—	—	—	—	Non-album single
2023	"Amelia" (Live Masterlink Sessions) (with Redtenbacher's Funkestra)	—	—	—	—	—	Non-album single

=== Radio singles ===
Year	Single	Album
2011	"Goodbye Girl"	Seasons of My Soul
2011	"Take Me As I Am"	Seasons of My Soul

=== Videography ===
Year	Song	Reference
2010	"Slow"	
2010	"Aretha"	
2010	"Alfie"	
2011	"Slow" (International Version)	
2011	"Am I Forgiven" (Directors Cut)	
2011	"Am I Forgiven"	
2011	"Goodbye Girl"	
2011	"Slow" (US version)	
2012	"P.F. Sloan"	
2012	"Sara Smile"	

=== Other appearances ===
- "Slave to the Rhythm" on Trevor Horn's Reimagines the Eighties
- "Still Within The Sound Of My Voice" on Jimmy Webb's Still Within The Sound of my Voice
