= Nashville Tears =

Studio album by Rumer
- Released: 14 August 2020
- Recorded: 2019–2020
- Genre: Country
- Label: Cooking Vinyl

Rumer chronology
This Girl's in Love: A Bacharach and David Songbook (2016)	Nashville Tears (2020)

Nashville Tears is the fifth studio album by British singer-songwriter Rumer. It was released on 14 August 2020 on Cooking Vinyl Records and debuted at number one on the Americana Album UK Charts and at number 17 on the UK Albums Chart.

The album's producer, Fred Mollin, sent Rumer a demo recording of "Oklahoma Stray", written by Hugh Prestwood, which made such an impression on her that she decided Prestwood's songs would become the sole focus of her recording project.

== Track listing ==
Standard Edition

All tracks are written by Hugh Prestwood.

No.	Title	Length
1.	"The Fate of Fireflies"	3:28
2.	"June It's Gonna Happen"	2:49
3.	"Oklahoma Stray"	3:32
4.	"Bristlecone Pine" (featuring Lost Hollow)	3:45
5.	"Ghost in This House"	3:15
6.	"Deep Summer in the Deep South"	3:20
7.	"Heart Full of Rain"	3:36
8.	"Hard Time for Lovers"	3:14
9.	"Starcrossed Hanger of the Moon"	3:55
10.	"The Song Remembers When"	4:29
11.	"That's That"	3:31
12.	"Here You Are"	3:14
13.	"Learning How to Love"	3:55
14.	"The Snow White Rows of Arlington"	4:29
15.	"Half the Moon"	3:31

== Charts ==
Chart (2020)	Peak position
UK Albums (OCC)	17
UK Americana Albums (OCC)	1
