= I'm Doin' Fine Now =

1973 single by New York City

Single by New York City

from the album I'm Doin' Fine Now
- B-side: "Ain't It So"
- Released: February 23, 1973
- Length: 2:48
- Label: Chelsea
- Songwriters: Thom Bell; Sherman Marshall
- Producer: Thom Bell

New York City singles chronology
"I'm Doin' Fine Now" (1973)	"Make Me Twice the Man" (1973)

"I'm Doin' Fine Now" is a song by American R&B group New York City. Released in 1973 by Chelsea Records from their debut album of the same name (1973), the song reached number 17 on the US Billboard Hot 100, number eight on the Billboard Easy Listening chart, number 20 on the UK Singles Chart and number 26 on the Canadian RPM 100 Singles chart. It was the 46th-most successful song of 1973 in the US.

When it debuted on Casey Kasem's American Top 40 on April 28, 1973, Kasem remarked that the members of the band were keeping their "day jobs" until they were sure that the band was going to be a big success. At the time of the record's debut on the top 40, Tim McQueen was a systems analyst at a New York City bank, Claude W. Johnson serviced jukeboxes in Harlem, John Brown was an apprentice engineer at a record company, and Edward Schell drove a New York City taxicab.

== Charts ==
=== Weekly charts ===
Chart (1973)	Peak position
Australia (Kent Music Report)	95
Canada Top Singles (RPM)	26
Canada Adult Contemporary (RPM)	24
UK Singles (Official Charts)	20
US Billboard Hot 100	17
US Adult Contemporary (Billboard)	8
US Hot R&B/Hip-Hop Songs (Billboard)	14

=== Year-end charts ===
Chart (1973)	Position
US Billboard Hot 100	46

== The Pasadenas version ==
"I'm Doing Fine Now"

Single by the Pasadenas

from the album Yours Sincerely
- B-side: "Cry My Tears (Posthumously Yours)"
- Released: January 20, 1992
- Length: 3:35
- Label: Columbia
- Songwriters: Thom Bell; Sherman Marshall
- Producers: Ian Levine; Billy Griffin

The Pasadenas singles chronology
"Another Lover" (1991)	"I'm Doing Fine Now" (1992)	"Make It with You" (1992)

In 1992, British group the Pasadenas released a cover of the song, retitled "I'm Doing Fine Now", that peaked at number four in the United Kingdom for four weeks, selling over 200,000 copies in the process. The single was released in January 1992 from their third album, Yours Sincerely (1992). It was produced by Ian Levine and Billy Griffin, and also reached the top 10 in Belgium, Greece, and Ireland.

=== Charts ===
==== Weekly charts ====
Chart (1992)	Peak position
Australia (ARIA)	143
Belgium (Ultratop 50 Flanders)	6
Europe (Eurochart Hot 100)	9
Europe (European Dance Radio)	2
Europe (European Hit Radio)	6
France (SNEP)	46
Germany (GfK)	38
Greece (IFPI)	9
Ireland (IRMA)	6
UK Singles (Official Charts)	4
UK Airplay (Music Week)	1
UK Dance (Music Week)	5
UK Club Chart (Music Week)	10

==== Year-end charts ====
Chart (1992)	Position
Belgium (Ultratop)	44
Europe (European Dance Radio)	13
UK Singles (OCC)	28
UK Airplay (Music Week)	22

=== Certifications ===
Region	Certification	Certified units/sales
United Kingdom (BPI)	Silver	200,000^{^}
^{^} Shipments figures based on certification alone.

=== Release history ===
Region	Date	Format(s)	Label(s)	Ref.
United Kingdom	January 20, 1992	7-inch vinyl; 12-inch vinyl; CD; cassette	Columbia	
Australia	March 16, 1992	CD; cassette	Columbia	
