= Yours Sincerely (The Pasadenas album) =

Studio album by the Pasadenas
- Released: 1992
- Length: 44 minutes
- Label: Columbia
- Producer: Ian Levine; Billy Griffin; the Pasadenas; Pete Wingfield; the Essentials; Lati Kronlund

The Pasadenas chronology
Elevate (1990)	Yours Sincerely (1992)	Phoenix (1995)

Yours Sincerely is the third album by British R&B/pop group the Pasadenas, released in 1992 by Columbia Records. The album contains re-recordings of songs by other artists that the band were fans of and had provided inspiration for them, plus one new song.

== Singles ==
Four singles were released from the album that reached the UK singles chart. A cover of New York City's 1973 hit single, "I'm Doing Fine Now", reached number four in the UK Singles Chart, becoming the Pasadenas' highest-placing single on that chart. This was followed by a cover of the Bread hit "Make It with You" (No. 20), the Jackson Sisters' "I Believe in Miracles" (No. 34) and the new song "Moving in the Right Direction" (No. 49).

== Track listing ==
No.	Title	Writer(s)	Original artist	Length
1.	"I'm Doing Fine Now"	Thom Bell; Sherman Marshall	New York City	3:33
2.	"Moving in the Right Direction"	Billy Griffin; Ian Levine	Original song	4:03
3.	"Make It with You"	David Gates	Bread	4:42
4.	"Let's Get It On"	Marvin Gaye; Ed Townsend	Marvin Gaye	5:38
5.	"Lucy in the Sky with Diamonds"	John Lennon; Paul McCartney	The Beatles	5:40
6.	"Everybody's Singing Love Songs"	Charles Buie	Sweet Thunder	4:16
7.	"Waiting in Vain"	Bob Marley	Bob Marley and the Wailers	4:49
8.	"I Believe in Miracles"	Mark Capanni; Bobby Taylor	The Jackson Sisters	3:38
9.	"Come on Down (Get Your Head Out of the Clouds)"	Leonard Perry; Katie Davis; Mallory Cowart	Greg Perry	3:23
10.	"Weak at the Knees"	Steve Arrington; Buddy Hankerson; Roger Parker; Charles Carter	Steve Arrington	4:40

== Charts ==
Chart (1992)	Peak position
German Albums (Offizielle Top 100)	49
UK Albums (Official Charts)	6

== Certifications ==
Certifications for Yours Sincerely
Region	Certification	Certified units/sales
United Kingdom (BPI)	Silver	60,000^{^}
^{^} Shipments figures based on certification alone.
