= The Pasadenas =

English R&B/pop group

- Clockwise from bottom left: David Milliner, Rockin' Jeff (Aaron Brown), Andrew Banfield, Hamish Seelochan and Michael Milliner.

Background information
- Origin: England
- Genres: R&B, pop
- Years active: 1988–2005
- Label: Columbia Records
- Past members: Andrew Banfield; Aaron Brown; David Milliner; Michael Milliner; Hamish Seelochan

The Pasadenas were an English R&B/pop group. They had two UK top 10 albums and eight UK top 40 hit singles, including "Tribute (Right On)" (1988), "Riding on a Train" (1988) and "I'm Doing Fine Now" (1992).

== Career ==
The group scored a UK number five hit, and topped the charts in the Netherlands in 1988 with their initial release, "Tribute (Right On)", which paid homage to soul musicians Diana Ross & the Supremes and Aretha Franklin. Their second single "Riding on a Train" would peak at number 13 in the UK singles chart. Both singles were taken from their debut album To Whom It May Concern, released in October 1988, an album which would peak at number 3 in the United Kingdom and which would go on to sell more than one million copies. In addition to the two top 20 singles, the album included "Enchanted Lady" (a small UK top 40 hit) and a cover version of the Chi-Lites' "Living in the Footsteps of Another Man".

In 1989, the Pasadenas were part of Band Aid II's version of "Do They Know It's Christmas", alongside Cliff Richard, Jimmy Somerville, Chris Rea and various S/A/W-produced stars.

In 1990, a slight change of sound brought the UK number 22 hit "Love Thing" (number 13 in the Netherlands) and "Reeling", which just managed to get into the UK top 75 in July 1990. Due to the failure of these singles the release of their 1990 album Elevate was pushed back a year and only came out in a number of selected territories in 1991.

As the album Elevate did not chart, the group made a covers album called Yours Sincerely in 1992. The Pasadenas achieved their highest UK hit position with a remake of New York City's 1973 hit "I'm Doing Fine Now", which sold more than 200,000 copies. The single was produced by Motorcity Records' Ian Levine along with Billy Griffin and reached number 4 in the UK (outpeaking the original's chart position of number 20, by 16 places). The Pasadenas managed to chart another three singles from Yours Sincerely into the UK top 75, with their last chart hit also being a cover (this time a version of Al Green's "Let's Stay Together" which charted at number 22 in November 1992).

After releasing their covers album, the Pasadenas were dropped from Columbia/Sony Music with their next releases being issued independently. In 1994 they issued "Longing For Someone" on the Sounds of London label (Solor), while in 1995 they charted (outside the top 75) at number 96 with a song called "Round & Round", their last single to be found on the Official Charts database.

In 2002, Cherry Red Records reissued the album To Whom It May Concern on CD. In April 2005, the Pasadenas took part in week three of the TV reality show Hit Me, Baby, One More Time, while in 2021, various members of the group contributed their thoughts and opinions to Channel 5's weekly Friday night retro countdown shows (broadcast under titles like Britain's Favourite 80s Songs).

Band member Andrew Banfield's sister, Susan, was one half of the Cookie Crew.

== Member details ==
- Andrew Banfield (born John Andrew Banfield, 1964)
- Michael "Mike" Milliner (born 1962)
- David Milliner (born 1962)
- Rockin' Jeff (also known as Aaron Brown, born Jeff Aaron Brown, 12 December 1964)
- Hamish Seelochan (born 1964)

== Discography ==
=== Studio albums ===
Year	Album	Peak chart positions			Certifications
Year	Album	UK	US	US R&B	Certifications
1988	To Whom It May Concern	3	89	49	BPI: Platinum
1990	Elevate	—	—	—	
1992	Yours Sincerely	6	—	—	BPI: Silver
1995	Phoenix †	—	—	—	
"—" denotes releases that did not chart.

† – Japan release only

=== Compilation albums ===
- Tribute: The Best of the Pasadenas (1995)
- Definitive Collection (1997)

=== Singles ===
Year	Single / Songwriter(s)	Peak chart positions				Certifications
Year	Single / Songwriter(s)	UK	US	US R&B	US Dance	Certifications
1988	"Tribute (Right On)"; The Pasadenas/Pete Wingfield	5	52	8	27	
1988	"Riding on a Train"; The Pasadenas	13	—	73	—	
1988	"Enchanted Lady"; The Pasadenas/Pete Wingfield	31	—	—	—	
1990	"Love Thing"; D. Milliner/M. Milliner/The Pasadenas	22	—	—	—	
1990	"Reeling"; D. Milliner/The Pasadenas/P. Sampson	75	—	—	—	
1991	"Another Lover"; M. Milliner/The Pasadenas	86	—	—	—	
1992	"I'm Doing Fine Now"; Thom Bell/Sherman Marshall	4	—	—	—	BPI: Silver
1992	"Make It with You"; David Gates	20	—	—	—	
1992	"I Believe in Miracles"; Mark Capanni/Bobby Taylor	34	—	—	—	
1992	"Moving in the Right Direction"; Billy Griffin/Ian Levine	49	—	—	—	
1992	"Let's Stay Together"; Al Green/Willie Mitchell/Al Jackson, Jr.	22	—	—	—	
1994	"Longing for Someone"	150	—	—	—	
1995	"Round & Round"; D. Milliner/The Pasadenas	96	—	—	—	
"—" denotes releases that did not chart or was not released in that territory.

== See also ==
- List of performances on Top of the Pops
