= I'm Doin' Fine Now (album) =

Studio album by New York City
- Released: 1973
- Studio: Sigma Sound, Philadelphia; Mediasound, New York City
- Genre: Soul
- Label: Chelsea
- Producer: Thom Bell, Wes Farrell, John Bahler

New York City chronology
I'm Doin' Fine Now (1973)	Soulful Road (1974)

Singles from I'm Doin Fine Now
- 1. "I'm Doin' Fine Now" Released: February 23, 1973

Professional ratings
Review scores
Source	Rating
AllMusic	3/5 stars

I'm Doin' Fine Now is the debut studio album recorded by American male vocal quartet New York City, released in 1973 on the Chelsea label.

== Singles ==
The album features the title track, which peaked at No. 17 on the Billboard Hot 100, No. 14 on the Hot Soul Singles and No. 8 on the Adult Contemporary chart. Also featured are two other chart singles: "Make Me Twice the Man" and "Quick, Fast, in a Hurry".

== Track listing ==
Side one
No.	Title	Writer(s)	Length
1.	"Hang Your Head in Shame"	Ron Baker, Norman Harris, Allan Felder	3:00
2.	"Make Me Twice the Man"	Tim McQueen	3:16
3.	"By the Time I Get to Phoenix"	Jimmy Webb	3:55
4.	"Sanity"	Tim McQueen, John Brown, Claude Johnson, Edward Schell	3:00
5.	"Hang On Sloopy"	Wes Farrell, Bert Russell	3:37
6.	"Set the Record Straight"	Tim McQueen	2:56

Side two
No.	Title	Writer(s)	Length
7.	"Quick, Fast, in a Hurry"	Thom Bell, Linda Creed	2:36
8.	"Uncle James"	Joseph Jefferson	3:25
9.	"Ain't It So"	Joseph Jefferson	3:36
10.	"I'm Doin' Fine Now"	Thom Bell, Sherman Marshall	2:52
11.	"Reach Out"	Wes Farrell, Danny Janssen, Bobby Hart	3:31

== Personnel ==
- Tim McQueen, John Brown, Edward Schell, Claude Johnson – vocals

== Production ==
- Thom Bell, Wes Farrell, John Bahler – producers
- Thom Bell, John Bahler – arrangers
- Joe Tarsia, Michael DeLugg, Gary Kellgren – engineers

== Charts ==
Chart (1973)	Peaks
U.S. Billboard Top LPs	122
U.S. Billboard Top Soul LPs	35

Singles

Year	Single	Peak chart positions		
Year	Single	US	US R&B	US A/C
1973	"I'm Doin' Fine Now"	17	14	8
1973	"Make Me Twice the Man"	93	44	—
1973	"Quick, Fast, in a Hurry"	79	19	—
