= Crazy for You (Let Loose song) =

1993 single by Let Loose

Single by Let Loose

from the album Let Loose
- B-side: "Cardboard City"; "Start a New Day"
- Released: 12 April 1993
- Studio: Moody (London, England)
- Genre: Pop rock
- Length: 4:19
- Label: Vertigo (1993); Mercury (1994)
- Songwriter: Richie Wermerling
- Producer: Nicky Graham

Let Loose singles chronology
"Crazy for You" (1993)	"The Way I Wanna Be" (1993)

"Crazy for You" is a song by British pop music trio Let Loose, released in April 1993 by Vertigo Records as their debut single from their self-titled album (1994). The song was written by Richie Wermerling and produced by Nicky Graham. The original 1993 release reached No. 44 in the United Kingdom and debuted at number 157 in Australia. In June 1994, "Crazy for You" was re-issued in the UK by Mercury Records and attained a new peak of No. 2 on the UK Singles Chart. It became the UK's eighth-best-selling single of 1994 and was nominated in the category for Best Single at the 1995 Smash Hits Awards.

Speaking to Digital Spy in 2009, Wermerling said of the song and its success: "I wrote the song myself and knew it was a bit prettier than some of my other ones, but I didn't think it would pick up as much as it did. It was around for months and even I had to turn off the radio after a while. I'm pleased though as it still pays for the bacon in the morning now!"

== Critical reception ==
The song received favorable reviews from music critics. Alan Jones from Music Week wrote, "'Crazy' is Let Loose's most catchy song to date, a nicely crafted pop gem, with a good chance of becoming a substantial hit, provided radio can fit them in alongside the established heart-throbs of East 17, Bad Boys Inc et al." Miranda Watson from Music & Media commented, "With a softer approach than East 17 and less dancey than Take That, Let Loose, a.k.a. Richie Wermerling (vocals), Robbie Jeffrey (guitar) and Lee Murray (drums) produce a light, melodic brand of pop, with a touch of Bros, designed to pull at teen girl heart-strings." Alex Kadis from Smash Hits gave it a full score of five out of five and named it Best New Single, saying, "This is a brilliant brilliant pop song with gorgeous lyrics, an "all together now" chorus and strong, emotive vocals."

== Track listings ==
=== 1993 release ===
- UK and Australian CD single
1. "Crazy for You" (7-inch) – 4:19
2. "Crazy for You" (Loose mix) – 6:06
3. "Cardboard City" – 4:34
4. "Crazy for You" (Reg mix) – 4:18
- UK 7-inch and cassette single; European CD single
1. "Crazy for You" – 4:19
2. "Cardboard City" – 4:34

=== 1994 re-issue ===
- UK, Australian, and Japanese CD single
1. "Crazy for You" – 4:09
2. "Cardboard City" – 4:34
3. "Candy Stripe" – 4:51
4. "Start a New Day" – 4:43
- UK 7-inch and cassette single
1. "Crazy for You" – 4:09
2. "Start a New Day" – 4:43
- UK 12-inch single
1. "Crazy for You" (Wild Fruit N.R.G. mix) – 7:57
2. "Crazy for You" (Wild Fruit club mix) – 7:55
3. "Seventeen" (The Wild Fruit mix) – 7:35
4. "Crazy for You" (radio mix) – 4:12

== Personnel ==
Let Loose

- Richie Wermerling – lead vocals, keyboards
- Rob Jeffrey – guitar, backing vocals
- Lee Murray – drums, backing vocals

Production

- Nicky Graham – producer of "Crazy for You"
- Let Loose – producers of "Cardboard City", "Start a New Day" and "Candy Stripe", remixing on "Crazy for You"
- Matt Kemp – engineer on "Crazy for You" and "Cardboard City", remixing on "Crazy for You"

Other

- Simon Fowler – photography (1993 release)
- Mainartery – design (1993 and 1994 releases)
- Mike Diver – photography, montage (1994 release)

== Charts ==
=== Weekly charts ===
Chart (1993–1995)	Peak position
Australia (ARIA)	67
Austria (Ö3 Austria Top 40)	28
Europe (Eurochart Hot 100)	7
Europe (European Hit Radio)	19
Germany (GfK)	91
Ireland (IRMA)	7
Israel (Israeli Singles Chart)	1
Latvia (Latvijas Top 20)	5
Scottish Singles Sales (Official Charts) 1994 re-release	2
UK Singles (Official Charts)	44
UK Airplay (Music Week)	30
UK Singles (Official Charts) 1994 re-release	2
UK Airplay (Music Week) 1994 re-release	1
UK Club Chart (Music Week)	44

=== Year-end charts ===
Chart (1994)	Position
Europe (Eurochart Hot 100)	96
Israel (Israeli Singles Chart)	42
Latvia (Latvijas Top 50)	42
UK Singles (OCC)	8
UK Airplay (Music Week)	5

== Certifications ==
Region	Certification	Certified units/sales
United Kingdom (BPI)	Gold	400,000^{^}
^{^} Shipments figures based on certification alone.

== Release history ==
Region	Date	Format(s)	Label(s)	Ref.
United Kingdom	12 April 1993	7-inch vinyl; CD; cassette	Vertigo	
Australia	26 July 1993	CD; cassette	Vertigo	
United Kingdom (re-release)	13 June 1994	7-inch vinyl; 12-inch vinyl; CD; cassette	Mercury	
Australia (re-release)	29 August 1994	CD; cassette	Mercury	
Japan	24 September 1994	CD	Mercury	
