= Rock Steady (Aretha Franklin song) =

1971 song by Aretha Franklin

- One of Side-A labels of US vinyl single

Single by Aretha Franklin

from the album Young, Gifted and Black
- A-side: "Oh Me Oh My (I'm a Fool for You Baby)"
- Released: October 11, 1971 (Atlantic #2838)
- Recorded: Unedited, undubbed master (#21312) w/o horns on February 15, 1971
- Studio: Criteria Studios (Miami, FL)
- Genre: Funk
- Length: 3:15
- Label: Atlantic
- Songwriter: Aretha Franklin
- Producers: Tom Dowd, Arif Mardin, Jerry Wexler

Aretha Franklin singles chronology
"Spanish Harlem" (1971)	"Rock Steady" (1971)	"Day Dreaming" (1972)

"Rock Steady" is a song written and performed by American singer-songwriter Aretha Franklin, released in October 1971, from her eighteenth album, Young, Gifted and Black (1972). The single reached the No. 9 spot on the Billboard Hot 100 charts that same year. It also peaked at No. 2 on the Billboard Best Selling Soul Singles chart. The original A-side, a rendition of the song "Oh Me Oh My (I'm a Fool for You Baby)" peaked at No. 73 on the Billboard Hot 100 and No. 9 on the Best Selling Soul Singles chart.

== Personnel ==
- Aretha Franklin – lead vocals, piano
- Donny Hathaway – electric piano, organ
- Bernard Purdie – drums
- Cornell Dupree – guitar
- Richard Tee – organ
- Chuck Rainey – bass guitar
- The Sweethearts of Soul (Brenda Bryant, Margaret Branch, Pat Smith) — backing vocals
- Robert Popwell, Dr. John – percussion
- The Memphis Horns
  - Wayne Jackson – trumpet
  - Andrew Love – tenor saxophone
- Ron Albert, Howard Albert, Chuck Kirkpatrick; engineer
- Jerry Wexler – production
- Tom Dowd – horn arrangement, production
- Arif Mardin – production

== Charts ==
Chart (1971)	Peak position
US Billboard Hot 100	9
US Hot Soul Singles (Billboard)	2

Chart (1994)	Peak position
UK Club Chart (Music Week)	41

== Cover versions ==
- The earliest cover was a reggae version recorded by The Marvels on the Pama Supreme label, coupled with "Be My Baby", in 1971.
- An early cover was in 1972 by Sweet Salvation, who recorded a whip-snapping cover for their sole eponymous album.
- The Jackson Sisters recorded a cover of the song in 1976 for their eponymous album.
- In 1987, a house version of the song was recorded by singer Dalis and released on Trax Records.
- Rap duo EPMD sampled the beat and Franklin's lyrics (more pronounced on the remix) for their 1989 single "I'm Housin" from their debut LP Strictly Business.
- Patti Austin covered the song on her 1994 album That Secret Place.
- Spanish rock rap band Def Con Dos sampled the horn section of the song's chorus on their song "Promiscuidad" from their 1996 album Ultramemia.
- Rap group People Under the Stairs mention the song in their song "The Next Step II" from their 1998 album The Next Step.
- Dawn Robinson of the group En Vogue did a solo cover of the song on 1998's Dr. Dolittle film soundtrack.
- Daryl Hall and John Oates covered the song on their 2004 album Our Kind of Soul.
- Prince released a version on his 2007 live album, Indigo Nights. The song features Beverley Knight.
- In 2008, the song was sampled by Japanese R&B singer Namie Amuro in her own song, "Rock Steady".
- Richard Elliot also covered this song as an instrumental in 2010 off his album, which was also titled Rock Steady. Franklin's vocals were replaced by Elliot's saxophone.
- In 2012, Christine Anu covered the song on her album, Rewind: The Aretha Franklin Songbook.
- Regina Love covered the song in TV series The Voice (season 9) in 2015.

== Usage in media ==
- The song was used in the 2000 American comedy film High Fidelity.
- The song is used as a diegetic track in 2011 video game Driver: San Francisco.
- The song was heard in the 2017 American comedy-drama film The Upside.
- The song was used as an introduction to Ellen DeGeneres' Netflix 2018 stand-up comedy special Relatable.
