= Soulful Road =

Studio album by New York City
- Released: 1974
- Recorded: Sigma Sound, Philadelphia, Pennsylvania
- Genre: Soul
- Label: Chelsea
- Producer: Thom Bell

New York City chronology
I'm Doin' Fine Now (1973)	Soulful Road (1974)

Professional ratings
Review scores
Source	Rating
AllMusic	3/5 stars

Soulful Road is the second and final studio album recorded by American male vocal quartet New York City, released in 1974 on the Chelsea label. The album's cover art parodies that of The Beatles' 1969 album Abbey Road.

== Singles ==
The album features the song "Happiness Is", which peaked at No. 20 on the Hot Soul Singles chart. Also featured are two other chart singles: "Love Is What You Make It" and "Got to Get You Back in My Life". Another single released, "Take My Hand", failed to chart.

== Track listing ==
All tracks are written by Joseph B. Jefferson, Bruce Hawes and Charles Simmons, except where noted.

Side one
No.	Title	Length
1.	"Happiness Is"	3:21
2.	"I've Had Enough"	3:54
3.	"Darling Take Me Back" (Talmadge Conway, Phil Terry, Theodore Life)	4:04
4.	"Can't Survive Without My Sweets"	3:36
5.	"Got to Get You Back in My Life" (Sherman Marshall, Phillip Pugh)	4:10

Side two
No.	Title	Length
6.	"Do You Remember Yesterday" (Linda Creed, Thom Bell, Kenny Gamble)	4:38
7.	"Only You"	6:02
8.	"Take My Hand" (Phil Terry, Talmadge Conway, Theodore Life)	4:18
9.	"Can't Go on Without You"	4:34
10.	"Love Is What You Make It"	4:31

== Personnel ==
- Tim McQueen, John Brown, Edward Schell, Claude Johnson – vocals
- Linda Creed, Evette Benton, Barbara Ingram, Lucille Jones – background vocals

== Production ==
- Thom Bell – producer, arranger
- Don Murray, Joe Tarsia – engineers
- Michael Hutchinson, Jim Gallagher, Dirk Devlin – assistant engineers

== Charts ==
Chart (1974)	Peak
U.S. Billboard Top Soul LPs	50

Singles

Year	Single	Peaks
Year	Single	US R&B
1974	"Happiness Is"	20
1974	"Love Is What You Make It"	41
1975	"Got to Get You Back in My Life"	76
1975	"Take My Hand"	—
