= Be Thankful for What You Got =

Song by William DeVaughn

Single by William DeVaughn

from the album Be Thankful for What You Got
- B-side: "Be Thankful for What You Got, Part 2"
- Released: March 1974
- Recorded: 1972
- Studio: Sigma Sound, Philadelphia, Pennsylvania
- Genre: R&B; soul
- Length: 7:12 (album version); 3:25 (single edit)
- Label: Roxbury Records
- Songwriter: William DeVaughn
- Producers: Frank Fioravanti, John Davis

William DeVaughn singles chronology
"Be Thankful for What You Got" (1974)	"Blood Is Thicker than Water" (1974)

"Be Thankful for What You Got" (also noted in some publications as "Be Thankful for What You've Got") is a soul song written and first performed by William DeVaughn. The record sold nearly two million copies on its release in spring of 1974, reaching #1 on the U.S. R&B charts and #4 on the Billboard Hot 100 chart. In 2021, it was listed at No. 374 on Rolling Stone's "Top 500 Greatest Songs of All Time".

The song is noted for its repeated line: "Diamond in the back, sunroof top, diggin' the scene with a gangsta lean", which has been sampled and interpolated in many songs.

== Background ==
DeVaughn wrote "A Cadillac Don't Come Easy", eventually re-written to become "Be Thankful for What You Got" in 1972, and spent $900 toward it under a development agreement, under which an artist will record a few initial demos or tracks where, if successfully approved, the company may reserve the right to extend the arrangement to Omega Sound, a Philadelphia production house, and release the song.

The session featured members of the MFSB group — guitarist Norman Harris, drummer Earl Young, bassist Rusty Jackman, vibist Vince Montana and conga player Larry Washington — secured by Allan Felder, who also developed the separate ad lib back-up chorus with his sister's vocal choir. John Davis provided the electric keyboard. Frank Fioravanti then secured the song's release on the Roxbury Records record label, run by producer-songwriter Wes Farrell.

With a sound and content influenced by Curtis Mayfield (and often erroneously attributed to him), its simple and encouraging lyrics hit home, to the extent that it became featured on urban gospel radio stations. In the lyrics, DeVaughn sings that you may not have a Cadillac or any car at all. But you should still be "thankful for what you got".

The edited version, which is the first part of the song, became a hit. The other half of the song is a longer instrumental with the repeated chords and rhythm before the final chorus comes in. The song is seven minutes long and radio stations preferred the sung portions over the instrumental portions.

== Chart history ==
=== Weekly charts ===
Chart (1974)	Peak position
Canada RPM Adult Contemporary	3
Canada RPM Top Singles	3
UK	31
U.S. Billboard Hot 100	4
U.S. Billboard R&B	1
U.S. Billboard Adult Contemporary	31
U.S. Cash Box Top 100	3

Chart (1980) (Re-recording)	Peak position
UK	44

=== Year-end charts ===
Chart (1974)	Rank
Canada	68
U.S. Billboard Hot 100	60
U.S. Cash Box	64

== 1980 remake ==
In 1980, DeVaughn recorded a remake, on his second album, Figures Can't Calculate, which reached #83 on the dance chart and #44 on the UK singles chart.

== Later uses ==
The song is featured in the films Bug (2002), Be Cool (2005) and La Mission (2010).

The song's refrain "Diamond in the back, sunroof top, diggin' the scene with a gangsta lean" has been referenced, sampled and/or interpolated in the following songs:

- "Keep Smiling" by Gabor Szabo (1976)
- "Gangsta Gangsta" by N.W.A (1988)
- "Keepin' the Faith" by De La Soul, from their 1991 album De La Soul Is Dead ("Diamond in the back, sunroof top, waiting for the credit card so she can go and shop")
- "Brakes" by De La Soul on the 1996 album Stakes Is High
- "West Savannah" by Outkast (1998) ("Nine in my hand, ounce in my crotch, diggin' the scene with a gangsta slouch")
- "Diamond in the Back" by Ludacris (2004)
- "Still Fly" by Big Tymers (2002) ("old-school Caddy with a diamond in the back")
- "Shut Up and Drive" by Rihanna (2007) ("I'm a fine-tuned supersonic speed machine, with a sunroof top and a gangsta lean")
- "Shootin' The Gift" by Hip Club Groove ("Moves is in the back, let the beat drop, diggin’ the scene, with Mackenzie and me").
- "Sonate Pacifique" by L'Imperatrice (2014)

== Covers ==
=== Massive Attack version ===
Massive Attack's cover version, retitled "Be Thankful for What You've Got", was featured on their 1991 debut album, Blue Lines. A music video was produced for the song; however, it was not released as a stand-alone commercial single. Instead, a remix by Paul Oakenfold was also included on their 1992 single release Massive Attack EP.

"Be Thankful for What You've Got"

Single by Lipbone Redding

from the album Science of Bootyism EP
- Released: April 21, 2009
- Length: 5:10; 6:12 (long version)
- Songwriter: William DeVaughn
- Producer: Jeff Eyrich for Lipbone Redding

=== Lipbone Redding version ===
Lawrence "Lipbone" Redding's cover version, "Be Thankful for What You Got", appeared on his 2009 EP Lipbone Redding and the LipBone Orchestra: Science of Bootyism, Beautiful Flying Records. The EP contains two versions of the song.

=== Other covers ===
Other artists who have covered the song include:

- The Intruders on their 1974 album Energy of Love
- Arthur Lee and Love on their 1974 album Reel to Real
- Donovan Carless in a reggae style in 1974
- Bunny Clarke, in a reggae style (produced by Lee "Scratch" Perry) in 1975
- Winston Curtisin a reggae style in 1984 (on World International Records)
- Sunset Gun in 1984 for CBS
- Sade on their bootleg recording Live at Nakano Sunplaza, Tokyo, Japan (May 11, 1986)
- Peter Blakeley as the opening theme for the 1991 movie The Taking of Beverly Hills
- Portrait on the 1993 soundtrack album Addams Family Values: Music from the Motion Picture
- Yo La Tengo on their 1997 EP Little Honda
- Vibraphone player Craig Peyton for Profile Records 1983, electro sequencer arrangement.
- Cleveland Watkiss on Blessing in Disguise (Polydor 1991).
- Omar Lye-Fook featuring Erykah Badu on his 2001 album Best By Far (titled "Be Thankful")
- Rumer on her 2015 EP Love is the Answer
- The Space Lady on her 2018 album On the Streets of Dreams
- Orgone on their 2021 album Raw & Direct

== Sources ==
- Nathan, David. Notes for William DeVaughn: Be Thankful for What You Got: A Golden Classics Edition. Collectables [sic] CD COL-5271. Collectables [sic] Record Corp., 1994.
