= To Whom It May Concern (The Pasadenas album) =

Studio album by the Pasadenas
- Released: 10 October 1988
- Genres: Pop; R&B
- Label: Columbia
- Producers: Pete Wingfield; Phil Legg; Robyn Smith; the Pasadenas

The Pasadenas chronology
To Whom It May Concern (1988)	Elevate (1990)

Singles from To Whom It May Concern
- 1. "Tribute (Right On)"; 2. "Riding on a Train"; 3. "Enchanted Lady"

To Whom It May Concern is the debut album by the British R&B/pop group the Pasadenas, released in 1988. The album contains three UK top 40 hits: "Tribute (Right On)" (No. 5), "Riding on a Train" (No. 13), and "Enchanted Lady" (No. 31). "Tribute (Right On)" also reached No. 52 on the US Billboard Hot 100.

== Critical reception ==
Professional ratings
Review scores
Source	Rating
AllMusic	3/5 stars
The Encyclopedia of Popular Music	3/5 stars
The Rolling Stone Album Guide	3/5 stars

Spin called the album "less tightly footnoted than the Fine Young Cannibals, but also less charismatic." The Washington Post wrote: "A smooth, pleasant but not especially involving pop-soul platter, this is zipless funk, airbrushed for maximum crossover potential. As with much Britsoul, this is less soul music than it is music about soul music." The New York Times wrote that it "harks back to ultrasmooth vocal-harmony groups of the 70's like the Spinners and Earth, Wind and Fire, but lacks memorable melodies."

== Track listing ==
No.	Title	Writer(s)	Length
1.	"Funny Feeling"	The Pasadenas; David Milliner	4:34
2.	"Living in the Footsteps of Another Man"	Samuel Garner; James Smith	3:44
3.	"Enchanted Lady"	The Pasadenas; Pete Wingfield	4:56
4.	"New Love"	The Pasadenas; D. Milliner; Michael Milliner	3:53
5.	"Riding on a Train"	The Pasadenas	5:20
6.	"Give a Little Peace"	The Pasadenas; M. Milliner	4:19
7.	"Tribute (Right On)"	The Pasadenas; Wingfield	5:10
8.	"I Really Miss You"	The Pasadenas; Andrew Banfield	4:38
9.	"Justice for the World"	The Pasadenas; M. Milliner	5:44
10.	"Something Else"	The Pasadenas; Aaron Brown	5:46

== Personnel ==
- The Pasadenas (Andrew Banfield, Aaron Brown, David Milliner, Michael Milliner, Hamish Seelochan) – vocals
- Prince Sampson – guitar
- Julian Crampton – bass
- Walter Cardew – drums
- Martin Virgo, Pete Wingfield, Phil Ramacon, Robyn Smith – keyboards
- Harry Morgan – percussion
- Horace Cardew – saxophone
- Vince Sullivan – trombone
- Damon Brown, Pete Cooper, John Thirkell – trumpet

== Singles ==
- "Tribute (Right On)" – 1988
- "Riding on a Train" – 1988
- "Enchanted Lady" – 1988

== Charts ==
Chart (1988–89)	Peak position
Australian Albums (ARIA)	149
UK Albums Chart	3
US Billboard 200	89
US Top R&B/Hip-Hop Albums	49
