= Be Thankful for What You Got (album) =

Studio album by William DeVaughn
- Released: 1974
- Recorded: 1974
- Studio: Sigma Sound, Philadelphia, Pennsylvania
- Genre: Soul
- Length: 42:04
- Label: Roxbury
- Producer: Frank Fioravanti (exec.); John Davis

William DeVaughn chronology
Be Thankful for What You Got (1974)	Figures Can't Calculate (1980)

Singles from Be Thankful for What You Got
- 1. "Be Thankful for What You Got" Released: 1974; 2. "Blood is Thicker than Water" Released: 1974; 3. "Give the Little Man a Great Big Hand" Released: 1974; 4. "Kiss and Make Up" Released: 1974

Professional ratings
Review scores
Source	Rating
AllMusic	3/5 stars

Be Thankful for What You Got is a studio album issued in 1974 by the soul singer William DeVaughn. It includes the best-selling song also titled "Be Thankful for What You Got".

== Track listing ==
All tracks are written by William DeVaughn, except where noted.

Side one
No.	Title	Length
1.	"Give the Little Man a Great Big Hand"	5:41
2.	"We Are His Children"	5:18
3.	"Blood Is Thicker than Water" (Pal Rakes, Russ Faith)	7:24
4.	"Kiss and Make Up"	2:53

Side two
No.	Title	Length
5.	"You Gave Me a Brand New Start"	2:43
6.	"Be Thankful for What You Got"	7:13
7.	"Sing a Love Song" (William DeVaughn, Frank Fioravanti)	3:27
8.	"You Can Do It"	3:40
9.	"Something's Being Done"	3:45
Total length:		42:04

== Personnel ==
- William DeVaughn - vocals, songwriting
- John Davis - organ, piano, sax, flute, synthesizer
- Jerry Cohen - clavinet, piano
- Norman Harris - guitar
- Pal Rakes - guitar
- Bobby Eli - guitar
- Hugh McDonald - bass
- Rusty Jackman - bass
- Al Price - drums
- Earl Young - drums
- Larry Washington - percussion
- Vince Montana - vibraphone
- Don Renaldo - strings, horns
- Nadine Felder - background vocals
- Gwen Oliver - background vocals
- Carl Paroulo - engineering, mixing
- Doug Fern - engineering
- Joe Tarsia - engineering, mixing
- Wes Farrell - art direction
- Richard Germinaro - illustration
- Big Cigar - album design

== Potential confusion ==
DeVaughn's second album, originally released as Figures Can't Calculate, also includes the track "Be Thankful for What You Got" (in a different version); this second album was later reissued on CD by Unidisc as Be Thankful for What You Got and by Hot Productions as Be Thankful for What You've Got.
