= Let Loose =

British pop trio

Background information
- Origin: London, England
- Genres: Pop, pop rock
- Years active: 1993–96; 2008–09; 2014; 2023
- Labels: Mercury; Right Track
- Members: Matthew James Pateman; Rob Jeffrey; Lee Murray
- Past members: Richie Wermerling

Let Loose is a British pop trio, started by Richard John "Richie" Wermerling (lead vocals and keyboards), Robert George Edward "Rob" Jeffrey (guitars and backing vocals) and Lee J. Murray (drums, percussion and backing vocals), and currently consisting of Jeffrey, Murray and former Bad Boys Inc singer Matthew James Pateman.

== History ==
The band initially had minor success in the UK Singles Chart with two of its first three singles, "Crazy for You" (number 44) and "Seventeen" (number 44). They also released "Face to Face", which was withdrawn from sale by their record label. "Crazy for You" was re-released in the UK, entering the UK Singles Chart at number 24, and climbing to reach number 2. The success of "Crazy for You" led to a remix of "Seventeen"; the track did not match the popularity of "Crazy for You" but peaked at number 11.

The band's first album, Let Loose, peaked at number 20 and sold 100,000 copies. The album release was followed by the single "One-Night Stand", which peaked at number 12. The final track to be taken from the album was the ballad "Best in Me", which, according to the album sleeve, was recorded in the lead singer Wermerling's bedroom when he was aged 15. The track became their second UK top 10 hit, peaking at number 8.

The band then embarked on a UK tour, and, after a seven-month break, Let Loose returned with a new single "Everybody Say Everybody Do", which peaked at number 29. Another seven months passed before a new single was released – a cover version of the Bread track "Make It with You". The single reached number 7 and gave the group a third top-10 success. This was followed by "Take It Easy", which peaked at number 25.

The following album, Rollercoaster, peaked at number 42 dropping the following week to #114 with sales of fewer than 30,000 copies. Two months later, a final single was released from the album in time for the Christmas market, but "Darling Be Home Soon" became the band's lowest-charting single, reaching number 65, and Let Loose split up shortly afterwards. Wermerling joined the band Bottlefly, Rob Jeffrey continued playing guitar in other projects and Lee Murray became a disc jockey and session drummer, and has worked in management with Holly Valance, Kelly Brook and Page 3 model Keeley Hazell.

In 1998, a Best of Let Loose album was released but did not enter the UK Albums Chart.

In 2006, Wermerling released his first solo album, Lost. He released and funded it, and it was available for download and as a CD through CDBaby.com and Wermerling's own website, but it failed to make the chart.

In early 2008, Wermerling and Murray reunited to write and record together under the Let Loose name. Rob Jeffrey was contacted but declined to be involved in the band's comeback. By December 2008, four new songs had been added to the official Let Loose Myspace page and a photoshoot had taken place. The band reported via Myspace it was in talks with several record labels, regarding possible recording contracts. Shortly afterwards, Wermerling and Murray left, but this time Wermerling recruited four other all-new band members. The album, Paint It in Gold, was released independently in May 2009, available as a limited CD through Wermerling's own website, and the first live appearance of Let Loose with the new line-up was on 4 June 2009.

In April 2014, it was announced the original line-up, including Jeffrey, was reforming for an arena tour called "Another Time, Another Place", scheduled to share the bill with other 1990s and 2000s acts, All Saints, Atomic Kitten, East 17, Big Brovaz and Jenny Berggren from Ace of Base. The tour was to visit eight UK cities in November 2014 but two weeks after the tickets went on sale, it was cancelled. It was unclear whether Let Loose would continue with the planned reunion.

In August 2023, Murray and Jeffrey announced their comeback with new material and live dates planned, with former Bad Boys Inc singer Matthew James Pateman replacing Wermerling.

A new single "If The World Was Ending" was slated for release on 29 September 2023 on Right Track/Universal Music.

In 2024, Pateman was announced as a new member of the Bucks Fizz spin-off The Fizz, alongside Nikk Mager of Phixx.

== Discography ==
=== Albums ===
List of albums, with selected chart positions and certifications
Title	Album details	Chart positions		Certifications
Title	Album details	UK	AUS	Certifications
Let Loose	Released: 7 November 1994; Labels: Mercury Records; Formats: LP, CD, Cassette	20	153	BPI: Silver
Rollercoaster	Released: 23 September 1996; Labels: Mercury Records; Formats: LP, CD, cassette	42	—	
Paint It in Gold	Released: 8 June 2009; Labels: Psychobabble; Formats: CD, digital download	—	—	
"—" denotes releases that did not chart.

=== Compilation albums ===
List of albums, with selected chart positions and certifications
Title	Album details	Chart positions
Title	Album details	UK
The Best of Let Loose	Released: 9 January 1998; Labels: Mercury Records; Formats: CD, Cassette	—
The Best of Let Loose: 1993–2013	Released: 16 October 2013; Labels: Psychobabble; Formats: Digital download	—
"—" denotes releases that did not chart.

=== Singles ===
List of singles, with selected chart positions and certifications, showing year released and album name
Single	Year	Peak chart positions						Certifications	Album
Single	Year	UK	AUS	AUT	JAP	GER	IRE	Certifications	Album
"Crazy for You"	1993	44	157	—	—	—	—		Let Loose
"The Way I Wanna Be"	1993	82	—	—	—	—	—		Let Loose
"Face to Face"	1994	—	—	—	—	—	—		Let Loose
"Seventeen"	1994	44	—	—	—	—	—		Let Loose
"Crazy for You" (re-release)	1994	2	67	28	—	91	7	BPI: Gold	Let Loose
"Seventeen" (re-release)	1994	11	—	—	—	—	28		Let Loose
"One Night Stand"	1995	12	123	—	—	—	—		Let Loose
"Best in Me"	1995	8	—	—	—	—	—		Let Loose
"Everybody Say, Everybody Do"	1995	29	—	—	—	—	—		Rollercoaster
"Make It with You"	1996	7	170	—	—	—	29		Rollercoaster
"Take It Easy"	1996	25	—	—	—	—	—		Rollercoaster
"Darling Be Home Soon"	1996	65	—	—	—	—	—		Rollercoaster
"—" denotes singles that did not chart or were not released
