= Let Loose (album) =

Studio album by Let Loose
- Released: 7 November 1994
- Genre: Pop
- Length: 49:32
- Label: Mercury
- Producers: Nicky Graham; Nik Kershaw; Richie Wermerling

Let Loose chronology
Let Loose (1994)	Rollercoaster (1996)

Singles from Let Loose
- 1. "Crazy for You" Released: 12 April 1993; 2. "The Way I Wanna Be" Released: 7 June 1993; 3. "Face to Face" Released: 31 January 1994; 4. "Seventeen" Released: 28 March 1994; 5. "Crazy for You (re-release)" Released: 13 June 1994; 6. "Seventeen (re-release)" Released: 10 October 1994; 7. "One Night Stand" Released: 16 January 1995; 8. "Best in Me" Released: 1995

Professional ratings
Review scores
Source	Rating
Music Week	3/5 stars
Smash Hits	5/5 stars

Let Loose is the debut album by British band Let Loose, released on 7 November 1994. It is the first studio album to be recorded by the original line-up of the band, and features their biggest hit, "Crazy for You". The album also spawned the singles "Seventeen", "One Night Stand", "Best in Me" and "The Way I Wanna Be". The album was also released as a limited edition picture disc vinyl in the United Kingdom.

== Critical reception ==
Smash Hits named Let Loose Best New Album. Jordan Paramor wrote, "Let Loose have waited years for success and they're living proof that all good things come to those who wait. The album takes patience though. On the first listen your fingers tap about, by the second your bums jigging and by the third... WHAM! Air guitars aloft! Strum away to the funky "Devotion", ping your strings to the smoochy "Shame" and swoon to the lovely "Best in Me". All hail the Guns N'Roses of pop!"

== Track listing ==
No.	Title	Writer(s)	Producer(s)	Length
1.	"Crazy for You"	Richie Wermerling	Nicky Graham	4:07
2.	"Seventeen"	Wermerling • Nik Kershaw	Nik Kershaw	3:27
3.	"One Night Stand"	Wermerling	Graham	4:05
4.	"The Way I Wanna Be"	Wermerling • Rob Jeffrey	Graham	4:47
5.	"I Love Your Smile"	Wermerling	Wermerling	4:54
6.	"Cardboard City"	Wermerling • Jeffrey • Lee Murray	Wermerling	4:46
7.	"Shame"	Wermerling • Murray	Wermerling	4:19
8.	"Super Sexy Real Thing"	Wermerling • Jeffrey • Murray	Wermerling	2:59
9.	"Best in Me"	Wermerling • Jeffrey	Wermerling	2:58
10.	"Devotion (I Don't Need It)"	Wermerling • Jeffrey	Wermerling	3:34
11.	"I Believe"	Wermerling • Murray	Graham • Wermerling	4:07
12.	"Love Like There's No Tomorrow"	Wermerling	Graham • Wermerling	5:27

Bonus tracks
No.	Title	Writer(s)	Producer(s)	Length
1.	"Funky Loving"	Wermerling • Murray	Wermerling	4:23
2.	"Face to Face"	Wermerling • Jeffrey	Graham	3:51
3.	"Golden Child"	Wermerling • Jeffrey	Wermerling	2:47
4.	"Take You Home"	Wermerling	Wermerling	3:43
5.	"Candy Stripe"	Wermerling • Saron	Wermerling	4:51
6.	"Start a New Day"	Wermerling • Murray	Wermerling	4:43
7.	"Sad"	Wermerling	Wermerling	4:38
8.	"Fashion Queen"	Wermerling	Wermerling	3:40
9.	"Rescue Me (Stop Playing Games)"	Wermerling • Murray • Jeffrey	Wermerling	3:17
10.	"What Would I Do"	Wermerling	Wermerling	3:35
11.	"Welcome to Life"	Wermerling • Jeffrey	Wermerling	3:15
12.	"The Dress She Wore (Best)"	Wermerling • Murray	Wermerling	4:39
13.	"You're Hurting Me"	Wermerling	Wermerling	3:19
14.	"I Love You, I Swear"	Wermerling • Murray	Wermerling	4:00

== Charts ==
Chart (1994/95)	Peak position
Australian Albums (ARIA)	153
Scottish Albums (Official Charts)	51
UK Albums (Official Charts)	20

== Certifications ==
Region	Certification	Certified units/sales
United Kingdom (BPI)	Silver	60,000^{^}
^{^} Shipments figures based on certification alone.
