= Mouth trumpet =

Vocal technique

Mouth trumpet is a vocal technique that imitates the sound of the trumpet.

The mouth trumpet sound is produced by using the vocal cords to produce the desired pitch and passing the sound through the lips that are held together with just enough tension so that they vibrate at the same frequency as the vocal cords, producing a trumpet-like sound.

Lip trumpet is another trumpet imitation technique (also known as lip buzzing) in that air is blown through squeezed lips to make them squeak (like with the real trumpet) to produce a tone without vocal cords. The pitch is controlled by lip tension and position. The timbre can also be varied by tongue position. Particularly difficult is here to control the lip humidity which strongly changes the available pitch range. Both techniques can be combined to play 2 note polyphonic.

== Mouth trumpet artists ==
- The Mills Brothers
- Earl Okin
- Raul Midón
- Victoria Vox
- Adam Matta
- Lawrence "Lipbone" Redding
- Naturally 7
- Kevin Olusola
- Chris Cunningham
- Stephen Colbert
- Young K (DAY6)
- Minnie Driver
- Zaz (Isabelle Geffroy)
- Clairo
- The Statesmen
