= Tribute (Right On) =

Song

"Tribute (Right On)" is the debut single by English group the Pasadenas, from their 1988 debut album To Whom It May Concern. The song was a hit, reaching No. 1 in the Netherlands and Belgium, No. 5 on the UK Singles Chart, No. 26 in Germany, No. 14 in France and No. 45 in New Zealand. In the U.S., the song peaked at No. 52 on the Billboard Hot 100, No. 8 on the R&B chart, and No. 27 on the Dance Club Songs chart.

== Charts ==
Chart (1988)	Peak position
Belgium (Ultratop 50 Flanders)	1
Canada Dance/Urban (RPM)	8
Denmark (Hitlisten)	8
France (SNEP)	14
Ireland (IRMA)	16
Italy Airplay (Music & Media)	1
Netherlands (Single Top 100)	1
Netherlands (Dutch Top 40)	1
New Zealand (Recorded Music NZ)	45
UK Singles (Official Charts)	5
UK Airplay (Music Week)	2
US (Billboard Hot 100)	52
US (R&B chart)	8
US (Dance Club Songs)	27
West Germany (GfK)	26
