= David W. Ross =

British actor

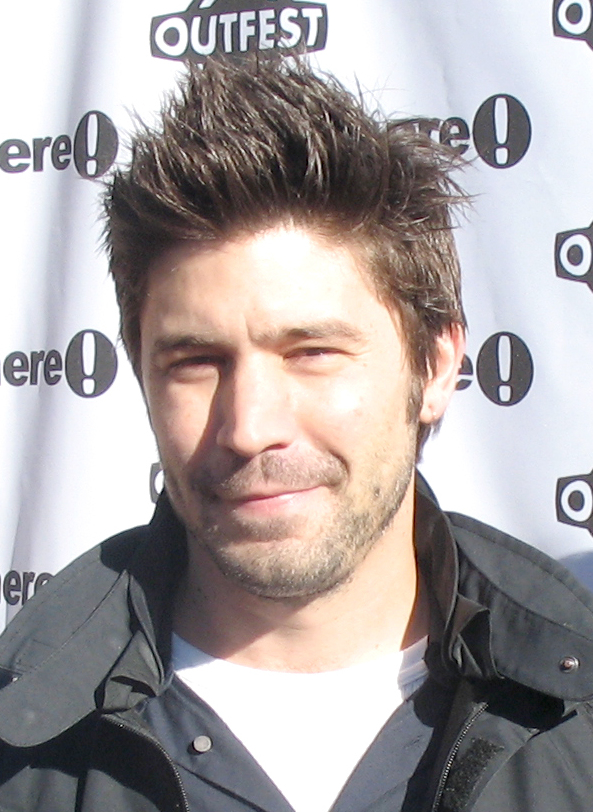

Background information
- Born: March 15, 1974 (age 52)
- Genres: Pop • dance
- Label: A&M Records
- Formerly of: Bad Boys Inc

David W. Ross (born 15 March 1974) is an English musician and actor. After moving to London at the age of 17 and seeking work as a film extra, his photo was spotted by Ian Levine, a boy band producer, and Ross was signed to A&M Records UK, as one of the four members of Bad Boys Inc. The group released one self-titled album, which spawned five hit singles.

As a screenwriter his first feature film I Do, tackles the controversial issue of gay marriage inequality in America. Ross appeared in the 2003 film 200 American as David Ross, as he did in Quinceañera and The Receipt.

Ross lives in Los Angeles. He discussed being an openly gay actor in the first episode of Stephen Fry's documentary Out There.
