= William DeVaughn =

American R&B/soul singer (born 1947)

- Born: William Edward DeVaughn Jr. November 28, 1947 (age 78); Washington, D.C., U.S.
- Genres: R&B, soul
- Occupations: Singer, songwriter
- Instruments: Vocals, guitar
- Years active: 1972–present
- Labels: Roxbury Records; Mighty Two Diamond Records

William Edward DeVaughn Jr. (born November 28, 1947) is an American R&B/soul singer, songwriter and guitarist, best known for the million-selling hit song "Be Thankful for What You Got" in 1974.

== Biography ==
DeVaughn was a salaried government employee as a drafting technician, and a part-time singer. He wrote a song called "A Cadillac Don't Come Easy", which was eventually re-written to become "Be Thankful for What You Got", in 1972. He spent $900 towards getting it recorded with Omega Sound, a Philadelphia production house. The record's producer at Omega, John Davis (a member of the MFSB studio session group), came up with a smooth arrangement, eventually booking time to record at Sigma Sound Studios in Philadelphia, used by Philadelphia International Records. Studio owner and chief engineer Joe Tarsia recorded and mixed the track.

The session featured members of the MFSB group – guitarists Norman Harris and Bobby Eli, drummer Earl Young, vibraphonist Vince Montana and percussionist Larry Washington; secured by Allan Felder, who also developed the separate ad-lib back-up chorus with his sister's vocal group. John Davis played keyboards on the track. Frank Fioravanti, the executive producer and co-ordinator, secured the song's release on Roxbury Records, a subsidiary of Chelsea Records, run by industry veteran Wes Farrell.

The record sold nearly two million copies on its release in spring 1974, reaching No. 1 on the US Billboard R&B chart and No. 4 on the Billboard Hot 100. The track saw two chart entries in the UK, with the record peaking at #31 (1974) and also #44 (1980), in the UK Singles Chart. It was awarded a gold disc by the RIAA on May 31, 1974. With a sound and content influenced by Curtis Mayfield, its simple and encouraging lyrics hit home, to the extent that it became featured on gospel radio stations. When his success as a recording artist seemed guaranteed, DeVaughn quit his government job.

DeVaughn released an album, mainly of songs with a religious character, and its second single, "Blood Is Thicker than Water", reached No. 10 R&B and No. 43 pop later in 1974; "Give the Little Man a Great Big Hand" had only minor R&B chart success early the following year. Live, DeVaughn preached to and admonished his audience from the stage. He lost interest in the music industry not long afterwards, working in a record store and again as a draftsman.

Fioravanti destined DeVaughn's 1980 effort, named after a new song by DeVaughn, Figures Can't Calculate to TEC Records in Philadelphia. The title song climbed to No. 37 in the Billboard R&B chart. The album was a Billboard "Top Album Pick" in July 1980 and featured a disco remake of DeVaughn's earlier hit, "Be Thankful for What You Got." Personnel on Figures Can't Calculate included guitarists Pal Rakes, T. Life and Dennis Harris, drummer Gerry Brown, bassist Larry McRae, and conga player Larry Washington. The album was co-produced by Frank Fioravanti, Pal Rakes, and vibraphonist/keyboard player Louis deLise. deLise also arranged and conducted the rhythm section, orchestra and voices.

In 2004, DeVaughn released a new single, "I Came Back", on his own Mighty Two Diamond Records. In 2014, two previously unreleased DeVaughn tracks, "Staying Power" and "Love Ballad of the Year" were included on the Sound Gems Records oldies compilation Lost Soul Gems. In December 2016, an additional previously unreleased track, "Love in Any Language" was added to the Lost Soul Gems collection. All of these later tracks were written by Fioravanti and others.

On May 12, 2017, a two-song medley, "What Does It Take (to Win Your Love for Me)" and "I Gotta Dance to Keep from Crying" was released on Sound Gems Records.

== Discography ==
=== Studio albums ===
Year	Album	Peak chart positions	
Year	Album	US Pop	US R&B
1974	Be Thankful for What You Got	165	10
1980	Figures Can't Calculate	—	74
2008	Time Will Stand Still	—	—
"—" denotes releases that did not chart.

=== Singles ===
Year	Single	Peak chart positions			
Year	Single	US Pop	US R&B	US Dance	UK
1974	"Be Thankful for What You Got"	4	1	—	31
1974	"Blood Is Thicker than Water"	43	10	―	―
1974	"Give the Little Man a Great Big Hand"	―	51	―	―
1974	"Kiss and Make Up"	―	―	―	―
1980	"Figures Can't Calculate"	―	37	―	―
1980	"Be Thankful for What You Got" [new version]	―	―	83	44
1982	"Creme De Creme"	—	—	―	―
2004	"I Came Back"	—	—	―	―
2014	"Staying Power"	—	—	―	―
2014	"Love Ballad of the Year"	—	—	―	―
2016	"Love in Any Language"	—	—	―	―
2017	"What Does It Take (to Win Your Love for Me)"	—	—	―	―
2017	"I Gotta Dance to Keep from Crying"	—	—	―	―
"—" denotes releases that did not chart or were not released in that territory.
