= I Do (2012 American film) =

- Film poster
- Directed by: Glenn Gaylord
- Written by: David W. Ross
- Produced by: David W. Ross; Stephen Israel
- Starring: David W. Ross; Jamie-Lynn Sigler; Alicia Witt; Grant Bowler; Maurice Compte; Mike C. Manning
- Cinematography: David Maurice Gil
- Edited by: James Cude
- Music by: Alana Balagot; Gabriel Isaac Mounsey
- Production company: School Pictures
- Distributed by: Breaking Glass Pictures
- Release date: July 18, 2012
- Running time: 101 minutes
- Country: United States
- Language: English

I Do is a 2012 American drama film, directed by Glenn Gaylord and written and produced by David W. Ross. The film stars Ross as Jack Edwards, a gay artist from England living and working in New York City. Following the death of his brother Peter (Grant Bowler), he enters into a green card marriage with his lesbian best friend Ali (Jamie-Lynn Sigler) so that he can stay in the country to help his widowed sister-in-law Mya (Alicia Witt), but is then forced to confront the unequal status of same-sex marriage as he meets and falls in love with Mano (Maurice Compte).

The film premiered at Los Angeles' Outfest on July 18, 2012, and was screened at several LGBT and mainstream film festivals in late 2012 and early 2013. It had a general theatrical release on May 31, 2013.

== Cast ==
- Jamie-Lynn Sigler as Ali Federman
- Alicia Witt as Mya Edwards
- Maurice Compte as Mano Alfaro
- David W. Ross as Jack Edwards
- Mickey Cottrell as Sam
- Jessica Tyler Brown as Tara Edwards (as Jessica Brown)
- Patricia Belcher as Gloria
- Grant Bowler as Peter Edwards
- Ashleigh Sumner as Christina
- Caryn West as April
