= Jackson Sisters (album) =

Studio album by the Jackson Sisters
- Released: 1976
- Length: 29:20
- Label: Tiger Lily

Professional ratings
Review scores
Source	Rating
AllMusic	4/5 stars

Jackson Sisters is the only studio album released by Detroit-based girl group the Jackson Sisters. The studio album was released in 1976. Several of the album's songs were written by Johnny Bristol.

The album's song "Miracles" is featured in the 2013 video game Grand Theft Auto V, on the Lowdown radio station.

== Track listing ==
All tracks composed by Johnny Bristol; except where indicated

1. "When Your Love Is Gone"
2. "Maybe"
3. "Why Do Fools Fall in Love" (Frankie Lymon, Morris Levy)
4. "Day in the Blue"
5. "Rockin' On My Porch" (Gloria Jones, Pam Sawyer)
6. "Boy, You're Dynamite"
7. "Rock Steady" (Aretha Franklin)
8. "Miracles" (Bobby Taylor, Mark Capanni)
9. "(Why Can't We Be) More Than Just Friends" (Warren Sams, William Peele)
10. "Shake Her Loose"
