= Rollercoaster (Let Loose album) =

Studio album by Let Loose
- Released: 23 September 1996
- Genre: Pop
- Length: 42:18
- Label: Mercury
- Producer: Nik Kershaw, Richie Wermerling

Let Loose chronology
Let Loose (1995)	Rollercoaster (1996)	Paint it in Gold (2009)

Singles from Rollercoaster
- 1. "Everybody Say Everybody Do" Released: 23 October 1995; 2. "Make It with You" Released: 10 June 1996; 3. "Take It Easy" Released: 19 August 1996; 4. "Darling Be Home Soon" Released: 4 November 1996

Rollercoaster is the second studio album to be released by British band Let Loose, released on 23 September 1996. It was supported by a small UK tour, it is the last studio album to be recorded by the original line-up of the band, and features the band's second biggest hit, "Make It with You". The album also spawned the singles "Everybody Say Everybody Do", "Take it Easy" and "Darling Be Home Soon". The album was released as a limited edition in Japan with alternate cover artwork.

== Background ==
The band embarked on a UK tour following the release of their debut album, and after a seven-month hiatus, returned with a new single - "Everybody Say Everybody Do" - which peaked at #29. Another seven months passed before a new single was released - a cover of the Bread track "Make It with You". The single reached #7 and gave the group their third Top 10 success. This was followed with "'Take It Easy" which peaked at #25.

The album Rollercoaster was released in September 1996, and peaked at #42, with sales of less than 30,000 copies. Two months later, a final single was released from the album in time for the Christmas market, but "Darling Be Home Soon" became one of the band's lowest charting singles reaching #65, and the band split up shortly afterwards. Wermerling joined the band Bottlefly, Rob Jeffrey continued playing guitar in other projects and Lee Murray became a DJ, session drummer, and has worked in management with Holly Valance, Kelly Brook and Page 3 model Keeley Hazell.

== Track listing ==
No.	Title	Writer(s)	Producer(s)	Length
1.	"Don't Change a Thing"	Richie Wermerling • Lee Murray	Nik Kershaw	3:33
2.	"Make It with You"	David Gates	Wermerling	3:48
3.	"Take it Easy"	Wermerling	Kershaw	4:29
4.	"Everybody Say Everybody Do"	Wermerling • Kershaw	Kershaw	4:01
5.	"Lover"	Wermerling • Murray	Kershaw	4:00
6.	"Darling Be Home Soon"	John Sebastian	Wermerling	4:15
7.	"Who's Gonna Love Me Now?"	Wermerling	Kershaw	4:34
8.	"Beautiful is What You Are"	Wermerling • Murray	Wermerling	4:21
9.	"The Colour of Your Love"	Wermerling • Murray • Rob Jeffrey	Kershaw • Wermerling	3:32
10.	"The Need"	Wermerling • Murray	Kershaw	3:53
11.	"The Sweetest Thing"	Wermerling • Jeffrey • B. Roberston	Jeffrey • Robertson	3:47
12.	"Rollercoaster"	Wermerling	Kershaw • Wermerling	4:56

Bonus tracks
No.	Title	Writer(s)	Producer(s)	Length
1.	"Guilty"	Wermerling	Wermerling	4:20
2.	"Who's Sorry Now?"	Wermerling • Murray • Jeffrey • Roberston	Wermerling	3:22
3.	"Woman to Woman"	Wermerling	Wermerling	5:03
4.	"Jessie Saunders"	Wermerling	Wermerling	4:58
5.	"All 'Cause I Love You"	Wermerling • Jeffrey	Wermerling
6.	"Butterfly"	Wermerling • Murray	Wermerling	4:51
7.	"Play Without Fear"	Wermerling	Wermerling	4:12
8.	"Catch Me When I Fall"			3:27
9.	"Memory Pain"			3:45
10.	"Addicted to Love"	Robert Palmer	Wermerling	6:25
11.	"Shakira"	Wermerling	Wermerling	4:59
12.	"Shelter"	Wermerling • Murray	Wermerling	4:56

== Charts ==
Chart (1996)	Peak position
Scottish Albums (OCC)	99
UK Albums (OCC)	42
