= Lawrence "Lipbone" Redding =

American musician

Lipbone Redding
- Also known as: Lipbone
- Born: Lawrence Redding; Greenville, North Carolina, U.S.
- Genres: Blue-eyed soul, blues, roots music, jam band, Americana music, folk song, meditative music
- Occupations: singer-songwriter, guitarist, voicestrumentalist
- Instruments: Vocals; acoustic guitar; Harmonica; Lip Trombone; vocal bass; throat singing; vocal percussion
- Website: www.lipbone.com

Lawrence "Lipbone" Redding is an American songwriter, guitarist, singer, composer, performance artist, and voicestrumentalist. He is most noted for his ability to vocally imitate trombones, bass and percussion and incorporate them into live musical performances. The name Lipbone is a contraction of "Lip Trombone". In addition, Redding also uses throat singing, which is one of the oldest forms of music found in a variety of cultures.

== Career ==
Redding's album Hop The Fence ranked number 3 on the Jamband Radio Chart in 2007 and remained in the top 10 for 11 consecutive weeks. The song "Dogs Of Santiago," written and performed by Redding, ranked in the top 100 of the Americana Music Association radio charts for the same year. In July 2011 the album Unbroken by Lipbone Redding and The LipBone Orchestra reached No. 71 on the Americana Music Association radio chart.

The song "Hollywood An' Vine", written and performed by Redding, is on the soundtrack of A&E's television program Parking Wars. The song "Tuscaloosa Suntan", written and performed by Redding, is on the soundtrack of MTV's television program Jersey Shore. The songs "I Hear Voices" and "Precious things", written and performed by Redding, are on the soundtrack of FX's television program Starved.

Based in New York City since the early 1990s, Redding is the co-founder of the 67-year performance art project LoveSphere (under the pseudonym "CitiZen One"). He is also a collaborator with the Bill T. Jones/Arnie Zane Dance Company and co-composer of the production "Chapel/Chapter." The evening-length show was awarded the 2006–2007 Bessie Awards by the New York Dance & Performance Awards Committee for best collaborative effort and 2008 Toronto's Dora Mavor Moore Award for outstanding production.

Redding is attributed with diverse recordings and compositions ranging from abstract to contemporary mainstream. Most notable are his albums on the BePop Records label: Hop The Fence (2006), Party On The Fire Escape (2007), Science Of Bootyism (2008), Unbroken (2011), The Best of LB Volume 1 (2012), Esmeralda (2014), Return of the Beautiful (2018), and Runaway Snail Remastered (2018). He also records under the project name "Pranavam Das" for the releases Solstice Sunrise (2021) and The Mysterious Art of Procrastination (2023)

He currently lives in North Carolina and is touring solo, although he occasionally continues to perform with long time collaborators and special guests.
