= Bad Boys Inc =

British boy band

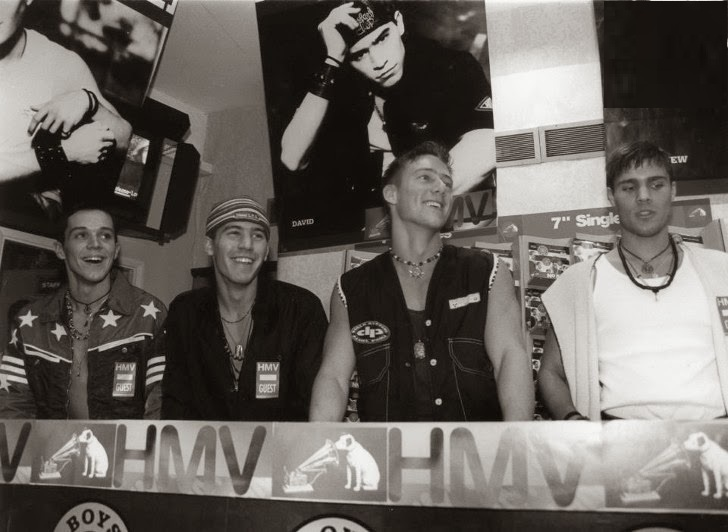

Background information
- Origin: London, England
- Genre: Pop • dance
- Years active: 1993–1995
- Label: A&M Records
- Past members: David W. Ross; Matthew Pateman; Tony Dowding; Ally Begg

Bad Boys Inc were a British boy band, formed in 1993 by the record producer Ian Levine. Signed to A&M Records, the members were David W. Ross (born 15 March 1974 in Bournemouth), Matthew James Pateman (born 14 May 1971 in Sidcup, Kent), Tony Dowding (born 6 September 1972 in Welwyn Garden City) and Ally Begg (born 21 August 1972 in Bury St Edmunds). They scored top 20 hits with "Don't Talk About Love", "More to This World" and "Take Me Away (I'll Follow You)" as well as a top 20 album in 1994.

== Career ==
Producer Ian Levine had recently worked with boy band Take That, but after finishing with them, he sought to create a new boy band. He auditioned and hired members David W. Ross, Tony Dowling and Ally Begg and singer Richard Traviss. Traviss left the group before the first single and Matthew Pateman was hired to be the lead singer. Ultimately, Pateman was the only member who sang on the recordings. Billy Griffin provided backing vocals along with others. The vocals were produced by Robbie Craig while Levine produced the music, which the members of the group were critical of and of Levine's style of management. Pateman and Ross were openly gay at the time, but both were told to keep it a secret, while Begg was in a relationship with a woman, but was also told to not mention it in interviews.

Almost straight away the group had commercial success with their debut UK hit single, "Don't Talk About Love", which reached the top 20, although not matching the success of Take That. The band also enjoyed minor international success with tours and promotion in Europe and Japan. The following two singles, "Whenever You Need Someone" and "Walking On Air" made the top 30, and although not charting as highly, the latter became their biggest selling single.

Pressure was on the group to score a top 10 hit, which they did with their first release of 1994, "More to This World". Soon after this, they released their debut album. The self-titled album charted at No.13 in the UK and remained on the chart for eight weeks. The album contained all of the group's six singles.

Going into 1995, the group were set to record their second album. The record company wanted to use other producers, sidelining Levine. They recorded the next single "Change Your Mind", a lush ballad in the style of George Michael's "Careless Whisper" and was seen as being the song that would break them into a higher league. Pateman also travelled to New York to record with producer Ric Wake for the planned follow-up. This was kept secret from Levine by management at the record company and he was given £100,000 to record some songs which they never planned to use for the album. Meanwhile tensions were growing within the group as to the fact that the other three members didn't sing on the recordings, despite now having vocal training. Singer Pateman agreed that the others should sing, but this was denied. Levine finally decided he didn't want any other producers working with the group and refused to let them go. At this point, the record company gave up on them and the band members also felt depleted by frustrations and all wanted out. The group split in March 1995 with the new recordings never being released.

In 2016, Pateman competed in Eurovision: You Decide under the name Matthew James, but his song "A Better Man" lost out to Joe and Jake's winning entry "You're Not Alone". In 2023, Pateman joined 1990s group Let Loose as a replacement for their singer Richie Wermerling and was announced as a new member of Bucks Fizz spin-off The Fizz in 2024, alongside Nikk Mager of Phixx.

== Discography ==
=== Albums ===
Title	Details	Peak chart positions	
Title	Details	UK	SCO
Bad Boys Inc	Released: 1994; Label: A&M Records; Format: CD	13	62
"—" denotes items that did not chart or were not released in that territory.

=== Singles ===
Year	Title	Peak chart positions			Album
Year	Title	UK	IRE	SCO	Album
1993	"Don't Talk About Love"	19	17	—	Bad Boys Inc
1993	"Whenever You Need Someone"	26	—	—	Bad Boys Inc
1993	"Walking on Air"	24	—	—	Bad Boys Inc
1994	"More to This World"	8	—	11	Bad Boys Inc
1994	"Take Me Away (I'll Follow You)"	15	—	15	Bad Boys Inc
1994	"Love Here I Come"	26	—	27	Bad Boys Inc
"—" denotes items that did not chart or were not released in that territory.
