= Make It with You =

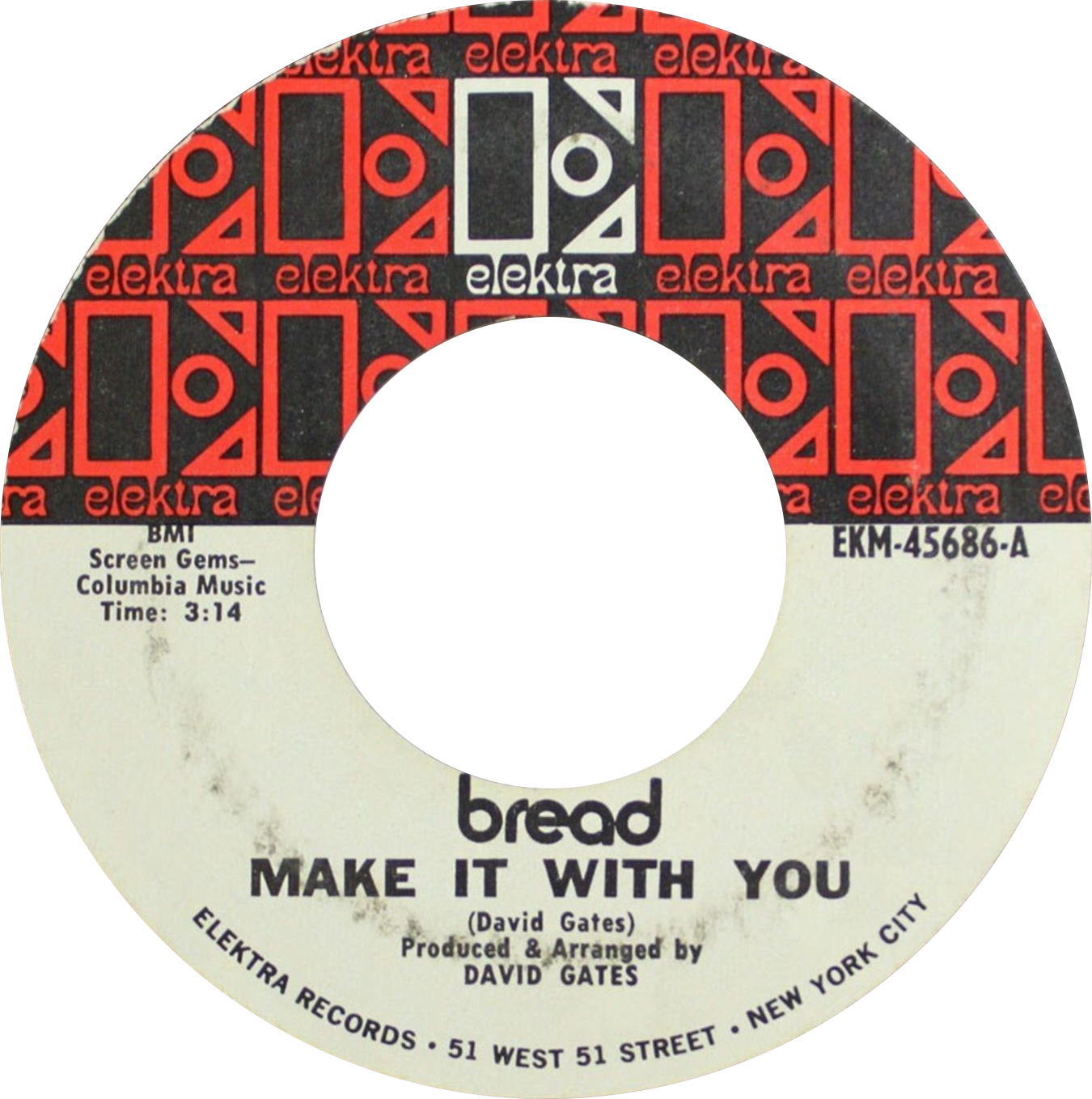
- One of US single pressings

Single by Bread

from the album On the Waters
- B-side: "Why Do You Keep Me Waiting"
- Released: May 1970
- Recorded: 1970
- Genre: Pop; soft rock; easy listening
- Length: 3:18
- Label: Elektra
- Songwriter: David Gates
- Producer: David Gates

Bread singles chronology
"Could I" (1969)	"Make It with You" (1970)	"It Don't Matter to Me" (1970)

"Make It with You" is a song written by David Gates and originally recorded by American soft rock band Bread, of which Gates was a member. Gates and drummer Mike Botts are the only members of the group to appear on the recording, which was Bread's only No. 1 hit on the Billboard Hot 100 chart.

== Release ==
The song first appeared on Bread's 1970 album, On the Waters. Released as a single in late May, it was the group's first top-ten hit on the Billboard Hot 100 singles chart, peaking at No. 1 for the week ending August 22, 1970; it also reached No. 5 on the UK Singles Chart. Billboard ranked "Make It with You" as the No. 13 song of 1970, and it was certified gold by the RIAA for sales of over one million copies.

Record World called it "well-constructed soft rock music."

== Personnel ==
- David Gates - lead & harmony vocals, acoustic guitar, electric guitar, bass, strings
- Mike Botts - drums

== Charts ==
=== Weekly charts ===
Chart (1970)	Peak position
Australia (Kent Music Report)	7
Canada RPM Top Singles	2
Ireland (IRMA)	10
New Zealand (Listener)	6
UK Singles Chart	5
US Billboard Hot 100	1
US Easy Listening (Billboard)	4
US Cash Box Top 100	1

=== Year-end charts ===
Chart (1970)	Rank
Australia (KMR)	57
Canada	24
US Billboard Hot 100	13
US Cash Box Top 100	22

== Certifications ==
Region	Certification	Certified units/sales
United Kingdom (BPI)	Silver	200,000^{‡}
United States (RIAA)	Gold	1,000,000^{^}
^{^} Shipments figures based on certification alone.^{‡} Sales+streaming figures based on certification alone.

== Notable cover versions ==
Many artists have recorded cover versions of "Make It with You". Among the most notable are:

- Claudine Longet who covered the song on her 1971 album We've Only Just Begun.
- Ralfi Pagan's Latin-soul version reached No. 32 on the Billboard R&B chart in the summer of 1971.
- British R&B group the Pasadenas released their version in 1992 which was a top 20 hit in the UK. It was the second single from their third album Yours Sincerely.
- British pop group Let Loose took their version to No. 7 on the UK Singles Chart in 1996. It was the second single from their second album Rollercoaster and was their third and last top 10 hit.
- Filipino indie folk-pop band Ben&Ben covered the song in 2019, with their version being used as the theme for the TV series of the same name which was released in 2020.

== See also ==
- List of Hot 100 number-one singles of 1970 (U.S.)
