= New York City (band) =

Former American music group

- Also known as: Tri-Boro Exchange
- Origin: New York City, New York, U.S.
- Genres: Soul, R&B
- Years active: 1972–1975
- Label: Chelsea
- Past members: Tim McQueen; John Brown; Edward Schell; Claude Johnson

New York City was an American R&B vocal group from the city of the same name. They formed in 1972 under the name "Tri-Boro Exchange", and all of the group's members had significant experience singing in other vocal and doo-wop ensembles.

== Career ==
Under the direction of record producers Wes Farrell and Thom Bell, New York City released two albums and several hit singles, the biggest being 1973's "I'm Doin' Fine Now", which reached U.S. number 17. They toured in 1973 with the Big Apple Band (two of whose members would later become part of Chic) as their backing band, but after two albums, the group parted ways.

== Members ==
- Tim McQueen (lead singer)
- John Brown (ex The Five Satins, The Cadillacs, The Moonglows)
- Claude Johnson (ex The Genies, Don & Juan)
- Eddie Schell - from Savannah, Georgia
- Nile Rodgers - (Chic)
- Bernard Edwards - (Chic)

== Discography ==
=== Studio albums ===
Year	Title	Peak chart positions		Record label
Year	Title	US	US R&B	Record label
1973	I'm Doin' Fine Now	122	35	Chelsea
1974	Soulful Road	—	50	Chelsea
"—" denotes a recording that did not chart.

=== Compilation albums ===
- The Best of New York City (1976, Chelsea)

=== Singles ===
Year	Title	Peak chart positions					
Year	Title	US	US R&B	US A/C	AUS	CAN	UK
1973	"I'm Doin' Fine Now"	17	14	8	95	26	20
1973	"Make Me Twice the Man"	93	44	—	—	—	—
1973	"Quick, Fast, in a Hurry"	79	19	—	—	99	—
1974	"Happiness Is"	—	20	—	—	—	—
1974	"Love Is What You Make It"	104	41	—	—	—	—
1975	"Got to Get You Back in My Life"	105	76	—	—	—	—
1975	"Take My Hand"	—	—	—	—	—	—
"—" denotes a recording that did not chart or was not released in that territory.

== See also ==
- One-hit wonders in the UK
- List of 1970s one-hit wonders in the United States
