= The Jackson Sisters =

American soul and disco girl group

- Origin: Detroit, Michigan, U.S.
- Genres: Disco, funk, R&B, soul
- Years active: 1971–1977
- Labels: Tiger Lily
- Past members: Lyn Jackson; Pat Jackson; Rae Jackson; Gennie Jackson; Jacqueline Jackson-Rencher

The Jackson Sisters (not to be confused with the Cincinnati Jackson Sisters, nor the siblings to American soul group the Jackson Five) were an American soul and disco family group in the 1970s, formed in 1971. The group hailed from Compton, California but were based in Detroit, Michigan.

== History ==
The Jackson Sisters were Jacqueline Jackson-Rencher, Lyn Jackson, Pat (Olivia) Jackson, Rae Jackson and Gennie Jackson. They recorded material for the Prophecy Records label, obtaining some modest success in the 1970s. However the group really came into their own nearly a decade later, following the emergence of the rare groove scene in the UK. Many of their songs were written by Johnny Bristol. "I Believe in Miracles", their hit song, was written and originally recorded by Mark Capanni in 1973, but his version would be released a year after the Jackson Sisters' version. Capanni also wrote A Day in The Blue. The track reached #72 in the UK Singles Chart in June 1987.

== Discography ==
=== Albums ===
- Jackson Sisters (1976)

=== Singles ===
| Year | Single | Chart positions | |
| Year | Single | US R&B | UK |
|---|---|---|---|
| 1973 | "I Believe in Miracles" b/w "(Why Can't We Be) More Than Just Friends" | 89 | 72 |
| 1973 | "More Than Just Friends" b/w "Rockin' On My Porch" | — | — |
| 1974 | "Boy, You're Dynamite" b/w "Shake Her Loose" | — | — |
| 1975 | "When Your Love Is Gone" (stereo) b/w "When Your Love Is Gone" (mono) | — | — |
"—" denotes the single failed to chart
