= Chelsea Records =

American record company

Chelsea
- Parent company: Sony Music Entertainment
- Founded: 1972; 53 years ago
- Status: Defunct since 1977; 48 years ago
- Distributor(s): Self-distributed
- Genre: Various
- Country of origin: United States

Chelsea Records was an American-based record company founded by musician, songwriter, and record producer Wes Farrell in 1972. Within the company's first four months, it released its first gold single, "Daddy Don't You Walk So Fast" by Wayne Newton. In addition to Newton, Chelsea featured a number of new and established artists like Tommy Boyce, Jim Gilstrap, Lulu, Jigsaw, New York City, and Rick Springfield.

== History ==
A sublabel, Roxbury Records, focused on the soul and R&B market and scored a million-selling hit with William DeVaughn's "Be Thankful for What You Got" in 1974.

It was reported in the 22 February 1975 issue of Record World that Chelsea artist Ronnie Williams was the charter client for new company, Camillo /Marcucci Productions which was formed by Tony Camillo. Williams' single "Dreamin'" charted in the UK.

RCA Records originally handled distribution for Chelsea, but Farrell switched to independent distributors in 1974, and later did its own distribution. Ultimately, RCA absorbed the label in 1977.
