= Valley of the Dolls =

Valley of the Dolls may refer to:

- Valley of the Dolls (novel), a 1966 novel by Jacqueline Susann
  - Valley of the Dolls (film), a 1967 film adapted from the novel
    - "(Theme from) Valley of the Dolls", the title song from the film, performed by Dionne Warwick
    - Dionne Warwick in Valley of the Dolls, a 1967 album
    - Valley of the Dolls (play), a 1996 stage production, adapted from the 1967 film; starring Kate Flannery
  - Jacqueline Susann's Valley of the Dolls, a 1981 TV miniseries adapted from the novel, directed by Walter
  - Valley of the Dolls (TV series), a 1994 soap opera adapted from the novel, starring Sally Kirkland
- Valley of the Dolls (album), a 1979 album by Generation X, or the title song
- "Valley of the Dolls", a song from the 2012 album Electra Heart by Marina and the Diamonds
- "Valley of the Dolls", a song from the 1980 soundtrack Foxes composed and performed by Giorgio Moroder for the 1980 film Foxes
- Beyond the Valley of the Dolls, a 1970 American film
