= Valley of the Dolls (film) =

1967 film by Mark Robson

- Theatrical release poster
- Directed by: Mark Robson
- Screenplay by: Helen Deutsch; Dorothy Kingsley
- Based on: Valley of the Dolls by Jacqueline Susann
- Produced by: David Weisbart
- Starring: Barbara Parkins; Patty Duke; Paul Burke; Sharon Tate; Tony Scotti; Lee Grant; Susan Hayward
- Cinematography: William H. Daniels
- Edited by: Dorothy Spencer
- Music by: André Previn; Dory Previn (songs); John Williams
- Production company: Red Lion Productions
- Distributed by: 20th Century Fox
- Release dates: November 16, 1967 (Genoa); December 15, 1967 (United States)
- Running time: 123 minutes
- Country: United States
- Language: English
- Budget: $4.7 million
- Box office: $44.4 million

Valley of the Dolls is a 1967 American drama film directed by Mark Robson and produced by David Weisbart, based on Jacqueline Susann's 1966 novel. The film stars Barbara Parkins, Patty Duke, and Sharon Tate as three young women who become friends as they struggle to forge careers in the entertainment industry. As their careers take different paths, all three descend into barbiturate addiction. Susan Hayward, Paul Burke, and Lee Grant co-star.

Valley of the Dolls was released by 20th Century Fox on December 15, 1967. The film received mixed-to-negative reviews from critics, but became a box office success and one of the studio's highest-grossing films. In the decades since its release, it has attracted a passionate cult following.

== Plot ==
Recent Radcliffe graduate Anne Welles is hired as a secretary at a theatrical agency which represents Helen Lawson, a cutthroat Broadway diva. Helen fears newcomer Neely O'Hara will upstage her, so she has Anne's boss pressure Neely to quit their upcoming show. Anne sours on show business after seeing Helen's cruelty toward Neely, but the business partner of her boss, Lyon Burke, dissuades her from quitting the agency.

Anne and Neely meet Jennifer North, a beautiful chorus girl with limited talent. They quickly become friends, sharing the bonds of ambition and the tendency to fall in love with the wrong men.

After Lyon lands her an appearance on a telethon, Neely mounts a nightclub act. Buoyed by her overnight success, she moves to Hollywood to pursue a lucrative film career. Neely soon succumbs to alcoholism and abuse of "dolls". She cheats on her husband, Mel Anderson, by having an affair with fashion designer Ted Casablanca. After Mel leaves her, Neely divorces him and marries Ted. Neely's spiralling drug and alcohol use eventually sabotages her career and ends her second marriage.

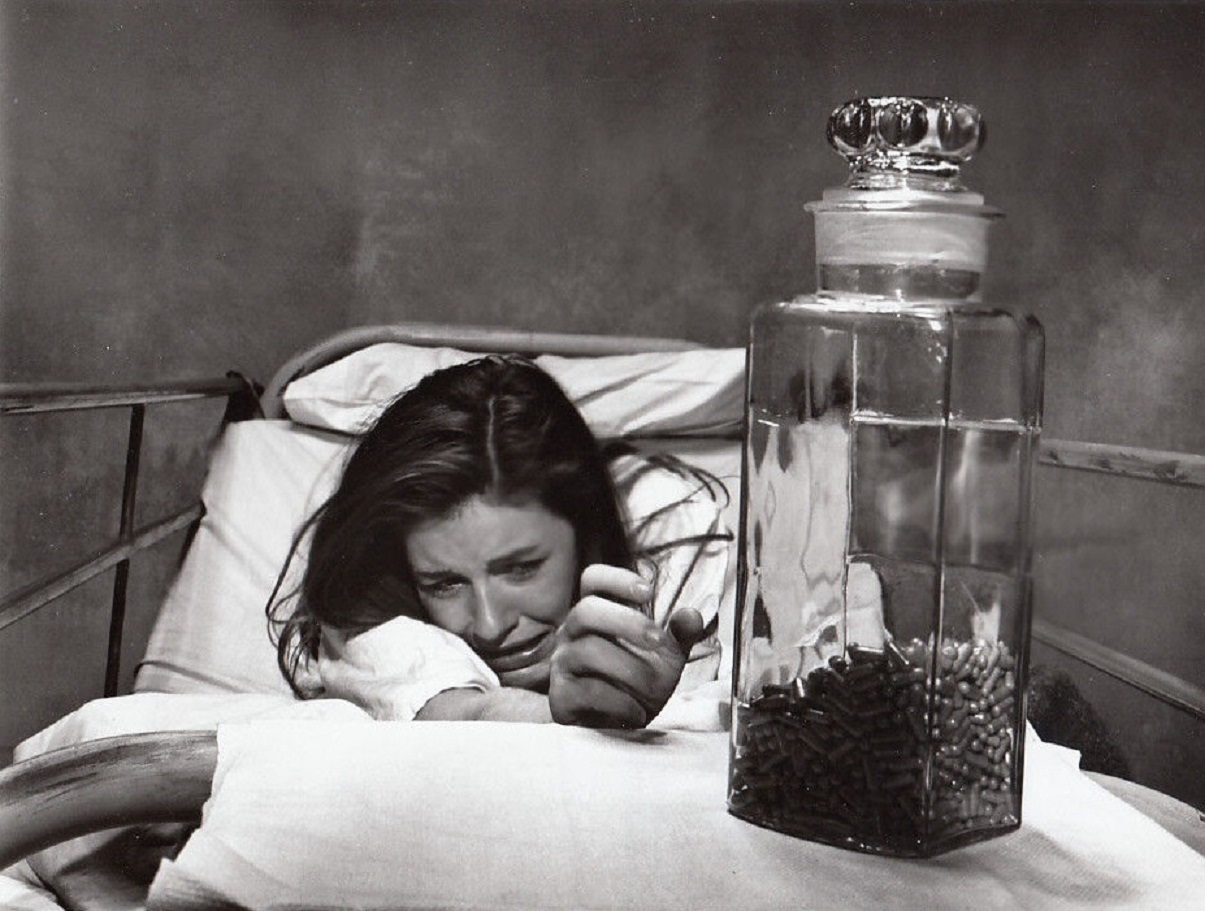
Patty Duke in a publicity still from the film

Anne and Lyon begin a romance, but Lyon resists Anne's wish to marry. When he abruptly leaves for England, Anne is distraught; she is further upset when her mother dies. Soon Anne's poise and natural beauty attract the attention of her boss's client, Kevin Gillmore, who hires her to promote his line of cosmetics in television and print ads. Kevin falls in love with Anne, but their relationship ends amicably when Anne realizes they are incompatible.

Jennifer follows Neely's path to Hollywood, where she marries nightclub singer Tony Polar. She becomes pregnant but undergoes an abortion after learning that Tony has the hereditary condition Huntington's chorea—a fact his domineering half-sister and manager Miriam had been concealing. When Tony's mental and physical health decline, Miriam and Jennifer place him in a sanitarium. Faced with Tony's mounting medical expenses, Jennifer reluctantly makes French "art films"—softcore pornography—to pay the bills. Jennifer learns she has breast cancer and, thinking her body is her only currency and her career would end if she had a mastectomy, overdoses on "dolls," and kills herself.

Neely's drug and alcohol abuse lands her in the same sanitarium as Tony, where they discover each other when Neely begins singing in the common area and he joins her. After she is released, Lyon gets her a role in a Broadway play. Neely soon causes trouble by having an affair with Lyon and attending a press party for Helen. During a catfight in the ladies' room, Neely removes Helen's wig and throws it in the toilet. Lyon ends his relationship with Neely when she relapses and is replaced by her understudy. Neely continues her bender at a nearby bar and is left screaming and sobbing in a deserted alley when the bar closes.

Upset by Lyon's infidelity, Anne dabbles in "dolls" and almost drowns in the ocean while intoxicated. She returns to New England to live with her Aunt Amy. Lyon follows Anne to New England and asks her to marry him. She declines his offer and remains happily single and independent.

== Cast ==
- Barbara Parkins as Anne Welles
- Patty Duke as Neely O'Hara
- Paul Burke as Lyon Burke
- Sharon Tate as Jennifer North
- Tony Scotti as Tony Polar
- Martin Milner as Mel Anderson
- Charles Drake as Kevin Gillmore
- Alex Davion as Ted Casablanca
- Lee Grant as Miriam Polar
- Naomi Stevens as Miss Steinberg
- Robert H. Harris as Henry Bellamy
- Jacqueline Susann as first reporter
- Susan Hayward as Helen Lawson

Uncredited

- Richard Angarola as Claude Chardot
- Richard Dreyfuss as assistant stage manager
- Gil Peterson as Neely's leading man
- Darlene Conley as sanitarium nurse
- Marvin Hamlisch as pianist
- Judith Lowry as Aunt Amy
- Thelma Pelish as theater hall receptionist
- Peggy Rea as Neely's voice coach
- Darryl Wells as Willie, Anne's boyfriend in Lawrenceville
- Margot Stevenson as Anne's mother
- Gertrude Flynn as ladies' room attendant

== Production ==
On October 13, 1965, it was announced that 20th Century Fox had purchased rights to the novel ahead of its publication. The film's production was continuously stalled by issues over the screenplay, originally written by Harlan Ellison. Fred Zinnemann was originally slated to direct in February 1966, but was replaced by Mark Robson in September. After Zinnemann's departure, Helen Deutsch and Dorothy Kingsley were hired for rewrites.

=== Deviations from novel ===
A major difference from the novel is that the film is clearly set in the mid-to-late 1960s, amidst the collapse of the studio system, and unfolds over the course of a few years. In the novel, the story had begun in 1945, and developed over the course of two decades.

The ending to the film was also changed dramatically from the novel. Original screenwriter Harlan Ellison had originally kept the more downbeat ending, where Anne and Lyon are married with a child. Anne is dependent on the "dolls" to numb herself from the pain of Lyon's affairs. However, through the Deutsch and Kingsley rewrites, the ending is changed to Anne leaving Lyon and her job to return to Lawrenceville, described as the one place she found real happiness. Lyon later visits her to propose but she refuses. These changes, so out of keeping with Anne's established character (well known to millions of readers), prompted Ellison to remove his name and credit from the film.

=== Casting ===
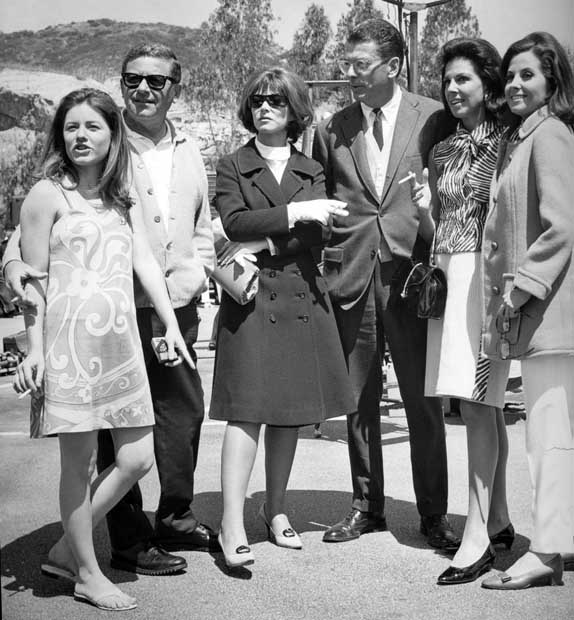
Left to right: Patty Duke, Mark Robson (director), Lee Grant, David Weisbart, Jacqueline Susann, and Barbara Parkins on the set.

Casting for the major roles began in late 1966, amidst the script rewrites. Robson and producer David Weisbart interviewed several prominent actors and actresses for the trio of women, including Ann-Margret, Jill Ireland, Jill St. John, Natalie Wood, Kim Novak, Lee Remick, and Debbie Reynolds. Susann had wanted Mia Farrow for the role of Ann, but Candice Bergen – who had recently signed with Fox – was cast in late 1966. However, she left before production began. 20th Century Fox wanted contract star Raquel Welch to play Jennifer, but she turned it down, not wanting to play a "sexpot" role. She asked to play Neely, but the studio refused. Jane Fonda also turned down a role as one of the trio.

In January 1967, columnist Dorothy Manners reported that Oscar nominated actress Elizabeth Hartman had been cast in the role of Neely O'Hara, beating out some more famous Hollywood actresses. As documented by Stephen Rebello in his 2020 book Dolls! Dolls! Dolls!: Deep Inside Valley of the Dolls, The Most Beloved Bad Book and Movie of All Time, Hartman had made a successful screen test that "floored" director Mark Robson and producer David Weisbart, the former already enthralled with her performance in Francis Ford Coppola's You're a Big Boy Now. Other stars courted for the role were Petula Clark, Helen Mirren, Helen Reddy, Barbara Harris (who received a "negative" reaction from Mark Robson after seeing her on Broadway in her widely acclaimed, Tony Award-winning performance in The Apple Tree). Barbra Streisand remained the favorite choice of David Weisbart. However, in February 1967, Patty Duke and Barbara Parkins were cast to play Neely and Anne, respectively. Both had auditioned for Neely O'Hara, but Parkins was cast as Anne. The role was Duke's first since the cancellation of her self-titled sitcom the prior year, and was meant to start a transition to more mature roles. Parkins' casting led to her role on Peyton Place being temporarily reduced until production ended.

Bette Davis, Ginger Rogers, Rita Hayworth, and Ann Sothern were initially considered for the role of Helen Lawson. Davis was the choice of Susann, and actively campaigned for the part. However, Judy Garland was cast in the role in March 1967. After Garland's firing the following month, Rogers and Lucille Ball were both offered the role, but declined; Rogers specifically cited the film's content and language. Robson then personally appealed to Susan Hayward to take the role, after Rogers and Ball had declined. Hayward accepted after "finally [being] persuaded for a hefty fee." Hayward reportedly had a difficult relationship with the cast and crew, and her clashes with Duke became part of the dramatic tension between their characters.

==== Garland casting ====
In March 1967, there was much publicity surrounding the casting of Judy Garland as Helen Lawson. Garland had not made a motion picture in five years. Her last film, I Could Go On Singing, was filmed in 1962 and released in March 1963. Despite decent reviews, it was a box-office failure. Shortly thereafter, Garland embarked on a weekly CBS television variety series, The Judy Garland Show, in the fall of 1963. Although it was favorably reviewed by the press, the ratings were low and the show was canceled in the spring of 1964.

By 1967, Garland was thin, frail, addicted to alcohol, and in dire financial straits and desperate for work. 20th Century Fox then signed her to appear as Helen Lawson in the film version of Valley of the Dolls. According to Gerold Frank, the author of the biography Judy, Garland was to receive $75,000 for eight weeks of work, then $25,000 a week if she was needed longer. This would also include her performance of one song in the film, titled "I'll Plant My Own Tree". In early March 1967, Garland flew to New York for the wedding of her daughter, singer-dancer Liza Minnelli, to Australian performer Peter Allen, and to meet with the author of Valley of the Dolls, Jacqueline Susann, at a press conference to promote the upcoming film. Additionally, both Garland and Susann appeared as "mystery" guests on an episode of CBS's game show What's My Line, on Sunday, March 5, to further promote the film. Garland returned to Hollywood to start the film, which was reportedly going well; she had filmed some costume tests for her role and even pre-recorded her song. However, after a week of filming, Garland was largely unable to function, due to her onset consumption of alcohol as well as her addiction to Demerol (pethidine). Susann, who was cast in a bit part in the film, was sharing Garland's dressing room at the time, and found the drug on the floor in her closet. Additionally, the studio was disappointed in the footage they had captured of Garland up to that point, with none being deemed usable. Thus, Garland was fired by Fox. She begged them to give her another chance, but was denied. They did, however, agree to pay her 50% of her promised fee—equating to $37,500—for her time. Garland was also given the copper-sequined pantsuit designed by Travilla for the film, which she wore during her final New York Palace Theatre engagement in August 1967.

In the years after the film's release, Patty Duke repeatedly spoke of the harsh treatment Garland had received by the studio and crew. In her 1987 autobiography, Call Me Anna, Duke felt that Garland had been deliberately exploited by the studio. She wrote: "The producers may have felt justified in hiring her in the first place ... They had gotten their PR mileage out of the situation, the 'Judy comeback' stories had created extraordinary publicity for the film and now she was expendable". In 2009, Duke told an audience at a "Dolls" event at the Castro Theatre in San Francisco that, despite Garland's issues with substance abuse, Robson and others exacerbated the situation by making her wait several hours before filming her scenes, fully aware that she would be bored, upset and drunk by that time.

=== Production ===
Production began in January and February 1967 with scenes shot in the New York City area. Principal photography started on February 17, and ended in late April. On July 21, during post-production of the film, producer David Weisbart died while playing golf with Robson.

In the decades since the film's release, several involved in the cast and crew have been critical of Robson's behavior on set. Tate reportedly refused to cry in one scene to avoid affecting her make-up, "which would cause further delay and further infuriate Robson." Duke was also critical of Robson, characterizing him as "the meanest son of a bitch I ever met in my life."

== Release ==
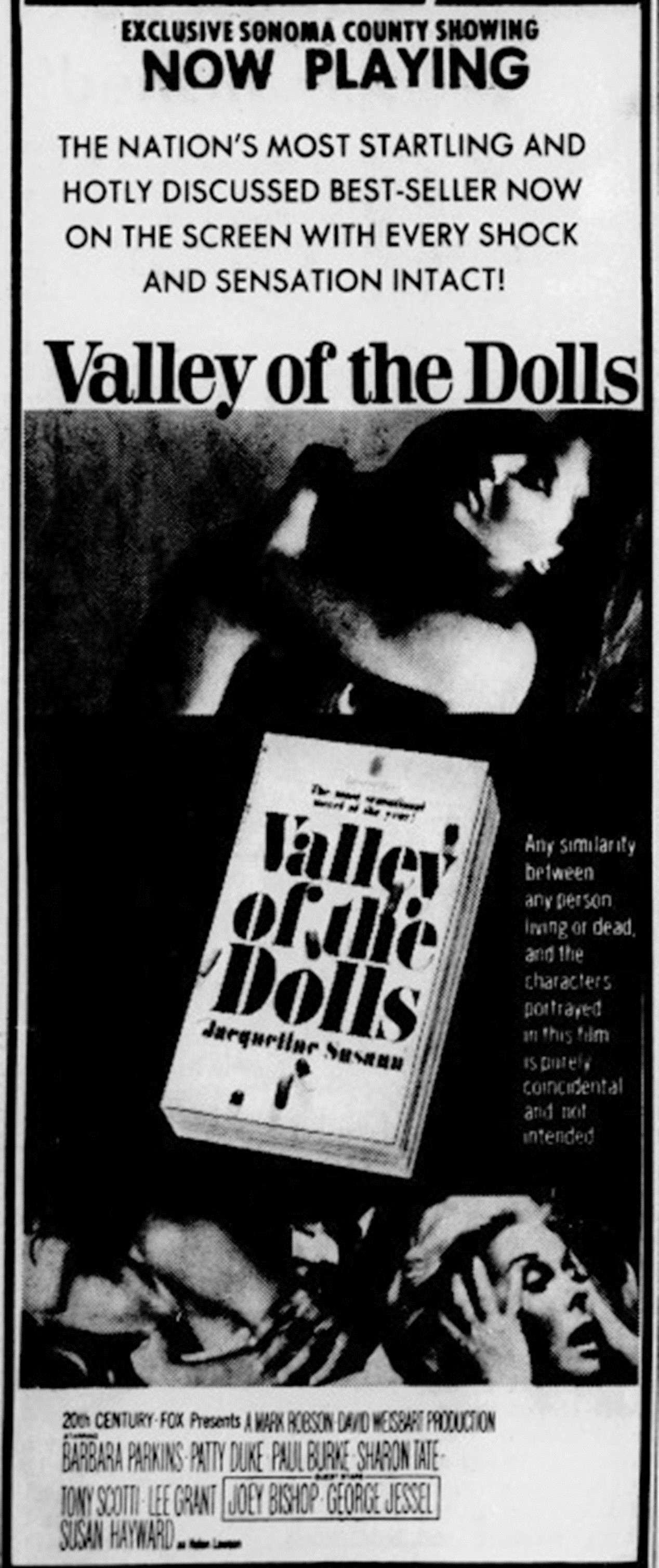
Theatre advertisement, January 26, 1968

The film had its world premiere in Genoa, Italy, on November 16, 1967. Following the premiere, the press boarded the cruise ship Princess Italia for a screening on the way to the Canary Islands. The ship then headed to Miami where the US premiere took place on November 28. Further premieres took place along the route until the ship arrived in Los Angeles for a final premiere on December 14. The film received a wide release on December 15, 1967. At a time when Fox was releasing most of its films under the roadshow theatrical model, Valley of the Dolls was one of the rare exceptions to the studio's practice. Upon its release, the film was the highest-grossing film for seven weeks from December 27, 1967, to February 13, 1968.

=== Box office ===
The film grossed $44.4 million worldwide against a $5 million budget. According to Fox accounts, the film needed to earn $9,700,000 in rentals to break even; it made $22,925,000, meaning it made a profit. By April 1968, it became Fox's highest-grossing film at the time not to have a roadshow theatrical release.

=== Critical response ===
Review aggregation website Rotten Tomatoes has a 32% rating based on 41 reviews. The critical consensus reads: "Trashy, campy, soapy, and melodramatic, Valley of the Dolls may be a dud as a Hollywood exposé, but has nonetheless endured as a kitsch classic". Metacritic, which uses a weighted average, assigned the film a score of 49 out of 100, based on 10 critics, indicating "mixed or average" reviews.

The film was included in the 1978 book The Fifty Worst Films of All Time (and How They Got That Way) by Harry Medved, Randy Dreyfuss, and Michael Medved. In 2005, it was listed in Golden Raspberry Award founder John Wilson's book The Official Razzie Movie Guide as one of the "100 Most Enjoyably Bad Movies Ever Made".

=== Accolades ===
Award	Category	Nominee(s)	Result
Academy Awards	Best Scoring of Music – Adaptation or Treatment	John Williams	Nominated
Golden Globe Awards	Most Promising Newcomer – Female	Sharon Tate	Nominated
Grammy Awards	Best Original Score Written for a Motion Picture or a Television Special	André Previn	Nominated
Laurel Awards	Top Drama		4th Place
Satellite Awards	Best Classic DVD		Nominated

=== Home media ===
The Criterion Collection released Valley of the Dolls along with its parody Beyond the Valley of the Dolls in September 2016 on DVD and Blu-ray. While the latter film had previously been released by Arrow Films in the United Kingdom in the same year, this was the first Blu-ray release for Valley of the Dolls.

== Related works ==
Beyond the Valley of the Dolls, a 1970 satirical pastiche of Valley of the Dolls, was filmed by 20th Century Fox while the studio was being sued by Jacqueline Susann, according to Irving Mansfield's book Life with Jackie. Susann created the title for a Jean Holloway-scripted sequel that was rejected by the studio, which allowed Russ Meyer to film a radically different film with the same title. The suit went to court after Susann's death in 1974; the estate won damages of $2 million against Fox.

Two updated versions of the Jacqueline Susann novel were later broadcast as TV series:

- Jacqueline Susann's Valley of the Dolls (1981) starring Catherine Hicks, Lisa Hartman, Veronica Hamel and David Birney.
- Valley of the Dolls (1994) starring Sally Kirkland, Colleen Morris, Melissa De Sousa and Sharon Case.

In 2020, Penguin Books published Dolls! Dolls! Dolls!, The Most Beloved Bad Book and Movie of All Time by Stephen Rebello, said to be "a detailed and definitive account of the entire phenomenon from the creation of the original novel to the aftermath of the release of the film."

== Legacy ==
The film has developed a cult following, with critics and audiences citing its campy sensibility. The film is particularly celebrated by gay men for its campiness and has become part of the LGBT cultural canon.

In 2012, Marina and The Diamonds released her sophomore album, Electra Heart. The tenth track of the album, "Valley of the Dolls", is based on the movie.

== See also ==
- List of American films of 1967
