= Steve Andropoulos and Betsy Stewart =

Fictional couple from the soap opera As the World Turns

Frank Runyeon and Meg Ryan as Steve and Betsy in an As the World Turns promotion for their wedding.

Stavares "Steve" Andropoulos and Elizabeth "Betsy" Stewart Andropoulos are fictional characters and a super couple from the American soap opera As the World Turns, which aired for almost 54 years before being canceled due to low ratings. Steve is portrayed by actor Frank Runyeon and Betsy is portrayed by both actress Meg Ryan and actress Lindsay Frost. The fictional couple wed on May 30, 1984; the episode attracted 20 million viewers making it the second highest-rated hour in American soap opera history.

== Storyline ==
The characters of Steve and Betsy fall in love in 1982, and Betsy offers to give him her trust fund money so he can start his own business. Although touched by the gesture, Steve refuses her offer.

Despite everyone's efforts to keep the news a secret, Steve's brother, Nick, finds out that the pair are dating and suspects that Steve is only after Betsy's trust fund. Nick confronts Steve and Betsy, and Betsy promises to stop seeing him in a panic. Despite this, Nick finds them picnicking together and violently confronts Steve; In the course of the argument, Nick has a massive heart attack and mutters that he wishes he'd killed Steve. After extracting a promise from Betsy never to see Steve again, Nick dies.

As the series progresses, Betsy instead hastily marries Craig Montgomery, when he saves her from an explosion. Their marriage is later strained due to Craig's incessant jealousy, leaving Betsy to flee to Spain.

Upon returning to Oakdale, Betsy is ready to leave Craig but loses her nerve when he plans a romantic evening for her. Torn between her love for Steve and her commitment to Craig, Betsy has sex with Craig. When Betsy later becomes pregnant, she's convinced the child is Craig's and decides to commit herself to the marriage. Steve is left heartbroken over this decision, with Craig continuously hinting that Steve and Diana McColl seem to be an item now.

Soon after, Steve is wanted for the theft of Whit McColl's gold coins. Later, Betsy finds a wounded Steve in the back seat. Despite knowing that he is wanted by the police, she takes him to the boathouse and tends to his wounds. Betsy enlists Steve's friend, Tucker Foster, to help them find out who framed Steve. Then Betsy's grandfather, David, catches Betsy sneaking into the supply room at Memorial Hospital to get medicine for Steve. David discovers that Steve is suffering from blood poisoning and gangrene and will die unless he gets treatment. With Betsy's help, David operates on Steve right there in the boathouse.

Meanwhile, one of Whit's rare coins has been bought by Bobbi Maxwell and her boyfriend, Lonnie. They trace Tucker from the pawnshop and call him for a meeting. Betsy and Steve join the "coin hunt" and arrive for the meeting to try to buy back the coin. Craig is relieved, because now he could spend more time with Diana. But when Betsy tells Craig she is going to call her broker and sell some stocks to get money for the cruise, Craig panics. He has made some bad investments and lost all her money in the stock market. The Montgomeries are broke, only Betsy doesn't know it yet. In the process of attempting to help Steve, Betsy finds that she is still in love with him and decides to leave her husband.

Upon returning from a romantic evening with Steve at the boathouse, Betsy went into labor. It was a breech birth, and Steve had to get her to the hospital quickly. Diana discovered him there and tried to get him to leave, but Steve couldn't tear himself away from Betsy, who gave birth to a healthy daughter. In remembrance of her father Dan, she named the child Danielle. Craig told his wife how much he loved her, and now that they had a child, he hoped things would be all right between them. Although Betsy told Craig it was over, things changed when he was fired from his job. Later, Betsy was so moved when she heard Craig talking to his sleeping daughter about his losses, and told Steve she couldn't leave Craig right now. When Steve exploded, Betsy stormed out, saying that they were through.

On Kim's advice, a sad Betsy wrote a note to Steve telling him how much she loved him. However, unbeknownst to her, Craig found the note, tore it up and forged a new one saying Betsy loved Craig and regretted having to betray him. The next morning, when Betsy came to see Steve, Diana answered the door wearing only Steve's shirt. Devastated, Betsy decided she couldn't stay with Craig, so she moved in with Kim. The next morning when Betsy arrived to get the rest of her things, Craig picked a fight with her and seemed to fall down the stairs. Craig then cried "paralysis," getting Betsy to move back in with him.

She surprised Craig by telling him she planned to build a home for abandoned children on the lot and call it the Refuge. Steve's construction company put in a bid. Diana heard about Steve's plans, got hold of the other bids, and changed them, making Steve's the lowest. Steve and Tucker's company got the job. When Betsy couldn't go through with a romantic evening, Craig left in disgust. Upset that Steve was hindering her marriage, Betsy tried to destroy everything that reminded her of him. She found the book of Greek poetry Steve had given her when they first met and decided to give it back to him. When Betsy arrived at Steve's apartment, she tried to say she was through with him, but the chemistry between them was too strong, and they fell into a passionate embrace. Betsy and Steve agreed not to have sex until after she had left Craig. After Craig accused her of having an affair with Steve, Betsy told Craig their marriage was over. Then she went upstairs to pack and discovered that Danielle was gone. Craig said he couldn't let Betsy take her away, so he hid her. Craig threatened to leave town with Danielle if Betsy called the police, and if she went to Steve, she'd never see her daughter again. Luckily, Craig's mother, Lyla, traced Danielle to the home of Mrs. Hoffman, a maid whom Betsy had fired previously, and Danielle was returned to her mother. At the same time, Diana McColl informed Steve that she knew Craig was faking his paralysis. Steve found Betsy at Kim's, and when she told him she'd left Craig for good, they had a joyful reunion.

One day while driving, Betsy was in a terrible accident in Vermont. When she woke up, she needed plastic surgery because of the burns on her face and she had no memory of who she was. Betsy found herself becoming close to her doctor and agreed to marry him. After a while, though she started getting flashbacks of Oakdale and had to go there. While in Oakdale, Craig recognised Betsy and he reunited her with her family. At the same time, Steve had been arrested for the murder of Whit McColl. However, the McColl housekeeper Dorothy Connors confessed to the crime on the witness stand.

Though Betsy loved Steve, they found themselves arguing more and more about money. Steve wanted the best for Betsy and spent lavishly but refused to tell Betsy where the money was coming from. Money pressures mounted when administration assistant Iva Snyder had an accident and Steve was unable to pay her medical bills. Soon they found themselves in debt, and Steve had to declare bankruptcy. Lucinda Walsh ended up buying Steve's construction company. He almost had sex with Betsy's younger sister, Emily. Ashamed, Steve left Betsy to start over in Greece. Betsy went to visit him but was heartbroken to learn that Steve was arrested and sentenced a life sentence in a Greek jail for trafficking drugs and with much sorrow, she divorced him in the winter of 1987.

After a failed attempt at romance with Josh Snyder, Betsy decided to get away from Oakdale and in 1988, she and Dani moved to Wisconsin to live near her uncle Ronnie Talbot. She did live briefly with Seth Snyder.

== Characters ==
- Elizebeth ''Betsy'' Stewart – She is in love with Steve Andropoulos, but she was tied to Craig Montgomery in a hasty marriage. She had promised Steve's brother, Nick, that she won't marry Steve. After finding out about Craig's misdeeds, she divorced him and married Steve, then went to Greece for their honeymoon.
- Steve Andropoulos – He is in love with Betsy. He was framed for stealing Whit McColl's gold coins and almost arrested for the murder of him but pardoned as Dorothy Connors pleaded guilty. Afterward, he was arrested and given a life sentence in a Greek jail for drug trafficking, and Betsy hesitantly divorced him.
- Craig Montgomery – Craig married Betsy after he saved her from an explosion. He had sex with her, which resulted in Betsy getting pregnant. They had the child and named her Danielle. However, the baby was really Steve's.
- Diana McColl – The spoilt daughter of Whit McColl. Was pregnant with Steve's baby but had a miscarriage. Went into the Witness Protection Program when her restaurant was involved in illegal activities.
- Daniel Stewart – Betsy's father, died in 1979.
- David and Ellen Stewart – Betsy's paternal grandparents. Very close to Betsy and Dani.
- Kim Hughes – Betsy's stepmother. The two have a very close relationship. Betsy was Kim's bridesmaid when Kim married Dr. Bob Hughes.
- Danielle – Betsy and Steve's daughter. Nickname Dani.
- Dorothy Connors – The McColls' housekeeper. Mother to Jay Connors.

== Cast ==
- Meg Ryan, Lindsay Frost – Betsy Stewart
- Frank Runyeon – Steve Andropoulos
- Scott Bryce – Craig Montgomery
- Kim Johnston Ulrich – Diana McColl
- Kathryn Hays – Kim Hughes
- Henderson Forsythe and Patricia Bruder – David and Ellen Stewart
- John Colenback – Dan Stewart
- Kristanna Loken – Danielle (Colleen Broomhall played Danielle as a toddler)
- Nancy Pinkerton – Dorothy Connors

== See also ==
- List of supercouples
