= Barbara Parkins =

Canadian actress

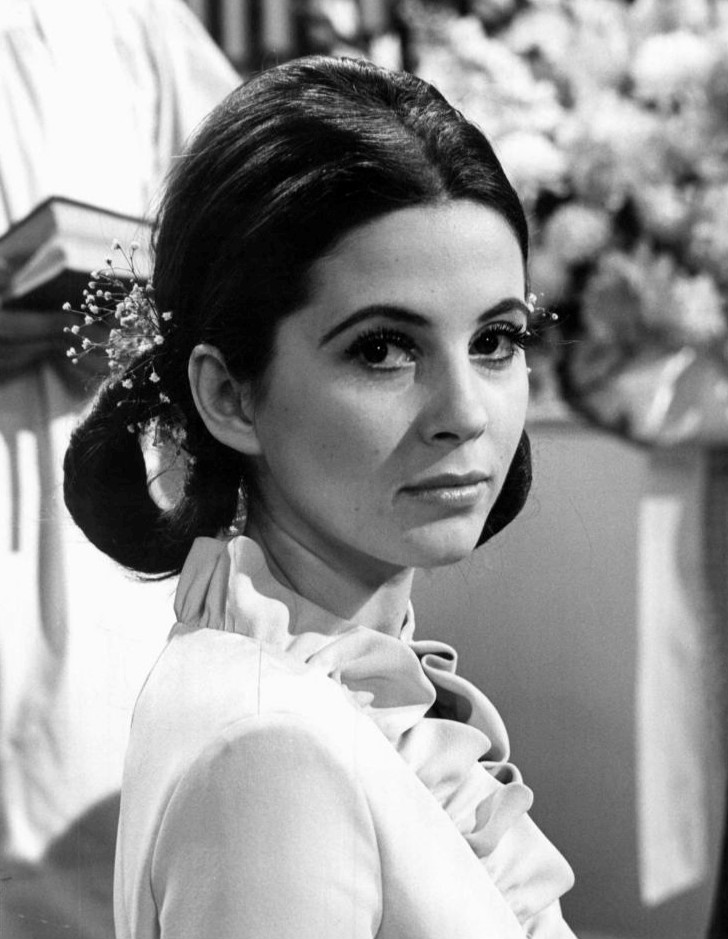
- Parkins as Betty Anderson in Peyton Place
- Born: May 22, 1942 (age 84); Vancouver, British Columbia, Canada
- Occupations: Actress; singer; dancer; photographer; artist
- Years active: 1961–1998
- Spouse: 1 (divorced)
- Children: 1
- Website: barbaraparkins.com

Barbara Parkins (born May 22, 1942) is a Canadian-American former actress, singer, dancer and photographer.

== Early life ==
Parkins was born in Vancouver, British Columbia. At the age of 16, she and her adoptive mother moved to Los Angeles, where she enrolled at Hollywood High School and studied acting, tap, ballet and fencing at the Falcon School, where her mother played the piano.

Parkins worked as an usher in a cinema to pay for drama lessons.

== Career ==
Parkins began her career as a backup singer and dancer in the nightclub acts of stars like comedian George Burns. She made her film debut in the 1961 low-budget crime caper 20,000 Eyes, and guest-starred in television series such as Leave It to Beaver, The Untouchables, Perry Mason and The Wide Country.

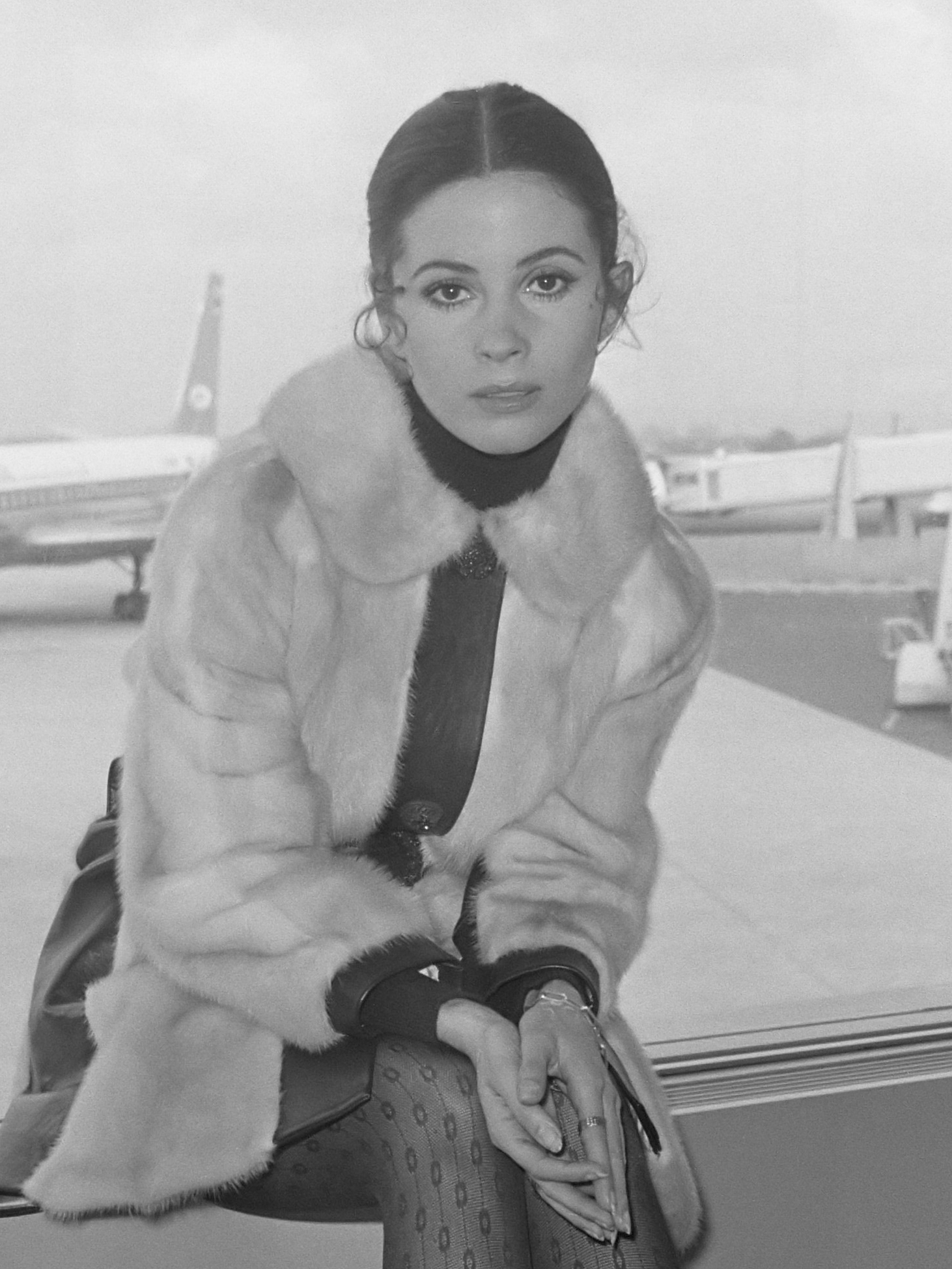
Parkins in 1970

Parkins was involved in two of the most highly publicized projects of the 1960s, the ABC primetime serial Peyton Place, and the film adaptation of Jacqueline Susann's best-selling novel, Valley of the Dolls.

In Peyton Place, Parkins received lead billing for her role as small-town bad girl Betty Anderson. The character was scripted to die in a car crash six weeks into the season, but audience reaction to Parkins was overwhelmingly favorable and her character was kept in the story line. In a late-1965 interview, the actress said she was lucky to have the role of Anderson, calling her character the "salt and pepper in the stew".

Parkins was the only leading cast member nominated for an award throughout the run of the series (Lee Grant and Ruth Warrick were nominated in 1966 and 1967, respectively, for supporting actress Emmy Awards, with Grant winning the award). In 1966, she was nominated for an Emmy Award as Lead Actress in a Drama Series, but lost to Barbara Stanwyck for The Big Valley. Parkins said while losing the award was painful, she was glad to have lost it to Stanwyck instead of Anne Francis, who was also nominated and whose work Parkins thought was "unfeminine".

Following the close of Peyton Place, producer Paul Monash developed a spin-off series, The Girl from Peyton Place, for Parkins. However, when co-star Ryan O'Neal, who played her husband, declined to participate, the project was shelved.

In Valley of the Dolls, Parkins played Anne Welles, a character based on author Susann. The Welles character was described as "the good girl with a million-dollar face and all the bad breaks". Although the film was trashed by the critics, it was a commercial success and became a cult classic.

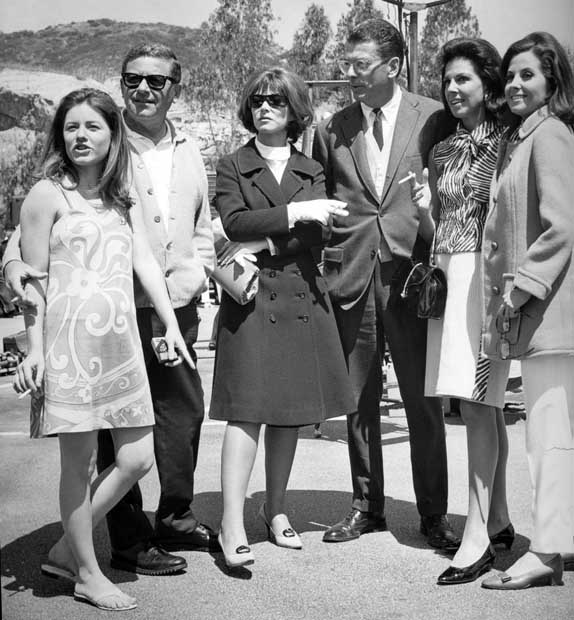
Left to right: Patty Duke, Mark Robson, Lee Grant, David Weisbart, Jacqueline Susann, and Parkins on the set of Valley of the Dolls (1967)

After visiting London in 1968 to be a bridesmaid in the wedding of Valley of the Dolls co-star Sharon Tate and director Roman Polanski, Parkins moved to England, where she starred in several productions, including Puppet on a Chain (1970), The Mephisto Waltz (1971), and Shout at the Devil (1976), Parkins said she moved to London because it was relaxed and simple, and she loved its traditions.

Parkins posed for nude pictorials in the May 1967, February 1970 and May 1976 editions of Playboy magazine.

In the 1970s and 1980s, Parkins appeared on American television in series that included Jennie: Lady Randolph Churchill, Captains and the Kings and The Testimony of Two Men, Fantasy Island, The Love Boat, Hotel, and Vega$. She also appeared in television films, including To Catch a King, in which she portrayed the Duchess of Windsor, and opposite Sharon Stone in Calendar Girl Murders.

Parkins returned to the role of Betty Anderson in Peyton Place: The Next Generation (1985), a one-shot sequel to the series.

In 1991, Parkins starred in Canadian mystery series Scene of the Crime. She appeared in two Susann-inspired projects, the biography Scandalous Me and a segment of the Lifetime series Intimate Portrait.

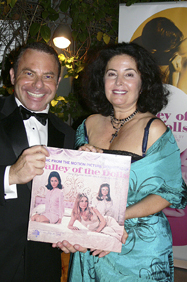
Kevin Norte and Parkins at a benefit reading of Valley of the Dolls in Hollywood in 2006

In 2006, Parkins participated with Ted Casablanca on the audio commentary for the DVD release of Valley of the Dolls.

While filming Valley of the Dolls, Parkins met photographer Edward Steichen, a friend of the film's cinematographer, and was influenced to begin a lifetime career in photography. She is also an advocate for endangered wildlife.

== Filmography ==
=== Films ===
Year	Title	Role	Notes
1961	20,000 Eyes	High School Girl	
1967	Valley of the Dolls	Anne Welles	
1970	The Kremlin Letter	B.A.	
1971	The Mephisto Waltz	Roxanne Delancey	
1971	The Deadly Trap	Cynthia	
1971	Puppet on a Chain	Maggie	
1972	Asylum	Bonnie	
1974	Christina	Christina/Kay	
1976	Shout at the Devil	Rosa O'Flynn/Oldsmith	
1979	Bear Island	Judith Rubin	
1982	Breakfast in Paris	Jackie Wyatt	
1984	Katy Caterpillar	Mother Nature	English version, voice

=== TV series ===
Year	Title	Role	Notes
1961	The Untouchables	uncredited	Episode: "The Lily Dallas Story"
1961	The Tall Man	Sue Wiley	Episode: "Shadow of the Past"
1961	Leave It to Beaver	Judy Walker	Episode: "No Time for Babysitters"
1961	87th Precinct	Mary	Episode: "Lady Killer"
1961	Wagon Train	Eve	Episode: "The Mark Miner Story"
1961	General Electric Theater	Betty/Ruth	2 episodes
1962	My Three Sons	Bobbie	Episode: "Coincidence"
1962	Perry Mason	Paula Durham	Episode: "The Case of the Unsuitable Uncle"
1962	Dr. Kildare	Annie	Episode: "The Soul Killer"
1963	Laramie	Marilee Bishop	Episode: "The Wedding Party"
1962-1963	The Wide Country	Sharon Crosley/Billie Kidwell	2 episodes
1964–1969	Peyton Place	Betty Anderson	Nominated – Primetime Emmy Award for Outstanding Lead Actress in a Drama Series (1966)
1971	A Taste of Evil	Susan Wilcox	Television film
1972	Ghost Story	Eileen Travis	Episode: "The New House"
1973	Snatched	Barbara Maxvill	Television film
1974	Born Free	Opal Vanek	Episode: "The Devil Leopard"
1974	Jennie: Lady Randolph Churchill	Leonie	6 episodes
1976	Gibbsville	Jenny	Episode: "All the Young Girls"
1976	Captains and the Kings	Martinique	3 episodes
1976	Law of the Land	Jane Adams	Television film
1977	Testimony of Two Men	Marjorie Ferrier/Hilda Eaton	Television film
1977	Young Joe, the Forgotten Kennedy	Vanessa Hunt	Television film
1978	Ziegfeld: The Man and His Women	Anna Held	Television film
1978	The Critical List	Angela Adams	Television film
1980	Vega$	Lani	Episode: "Aloha, You're Dead"
1980	Fantasy Island	Lorna Hendricks	Episode: "The Love Doctor/Pleasure Palace/Possessed"
1981	The Manions of America	Charlotte Kent	Miniseries
1983	Hotel	Eileen Weston	Episode: "Faith, Hope & Charity"
1983	Uncommon Valor	Dr. Margaret Houghton	Television film
1984	To Catch a King	Duchess of Windsor	Television film
1984	Calendar Girl Murders	Cleo Banks	
1985	Peyton Place: The Next Generation	Betty Anderson	Television film
1986	Perry Mason: The Case of the Notorious Nun	Ellen Cartwright	Television film
1988	Jake and the Fatman	Candace Morgan	Episode: "But Not for Me"
1989	Murder, She Wrote	Kay Weber	Episode: "The Error of Her Ways"
1991	Scene of the Crime	Various characters	Episode: "Wild About Harry"
1996	Picket Fences	Lucy Wanamaker	Episode: "Forget Selma"
1998	Scandalous Me: The Jacqueline Susann Story	Annie Laurie Williams	Television film
1998	Superman: The Animated Series	Mother Box	Episode: "Apokolips... Now!"
