= Dolls! Dolls! Dolls! =

Book by Stephen Rebello

Dolls! Dolls! Dolls!: Deep Inside Valley of the Dolls, the Most Beloved Bad Book and Movie of All Time
- Author: Stephen Rebello
- Language: English
- Genre: Non-fiction
- Publisher: Penguin Books
- Publication date: June 2, 2020
- Publication place: United States
- Media type: Print (paperback)
- Pages: 336 (first edition, paperback)
- ISBN: 9780143133506

Dolls! Dolls! Dolls!: Deep Inside Valley of the Dolls, the Most Beloved Bad Book and Movie of All Time is a non-fiction book by Stephen Rebello. It details the creation of the 1966 novel of the same name by first-time novelist Jacqueline Susann and documents every aspect of the creation of the 1967 motion picture adaptation Valley of the Dolls.

The book was first published on June 2, 2020, by Penguin Books. Stephen Rebello extensively researched the narrative through the personal records and archives of film director Mark Robson, producer David Weisbart, studio records of the film's distributor 20th Century Fox, court case depositions including those of Darryl F. Zanuck, Richard D. Zanuck, studio executive David Brown, accessing contemporary news accounts through newspaper and magazine archives, as well as through new interviews he conducted with actors, crew members, journalists and others involved in the film and/or active in the entertainment business at the time the film was in preproduction, production and release.

== Synopsis ==
Rebello details the writing, publication, promotion, controversy and international success of the original novel written by Jacqueline Susann as well the discovery of the novel by fledgling film producer Robert Evans and its preemptive sale to 20th Century Fox. From there, the book documents the development of the screenplay by three successive writers Harlan Ellison, Helen Deutsch and Dorothy Kingsley; the intense competition among young actresses wanting to play Susann's young heroines "Anne Welles", "Neely O'Hara" and "Jennifer North"; the hiring of costume designer Travilla and legendary cinematographer William H. Daniels and songwriters Dory Previn and Andre Previn; the details of the hiring and firing of Judy Garland, the hiring of her replacement Susan Hayward and the sometimes-contentious processes of filming, editing, scoring by John Williams; postproduction, promotion and major success at the box-office despite negative reviews by the critics. Dolls! Dolls! Dolls! sheds light on the daily lives of the filmmakers, some of whom believed they were making a frank and honest look at women struggling with prescription pill addiction, betrayal, loneliness and terminal illness as they climb the ladder of show business success.

== Publication history ==
The book was published in paperback on June 2, 2020, by Penguin Books and concurrently became available on Kindle and in an unabridged version for Tantor Media narrated by Paul Boehmer. Less than a month after publication, the book went into a second printing.

== Critical reception ==
The book received considerable media attention and critical praise. The editors of Vogue chose it as one of best books of the summer, praising its "great detail and heavy research" and calling it "as heady and colorful as the pulsating Pucci prints Susann so famously wore". Kirkus Reviews thought the book "written with a cinematic excitement", "meticulously detailed" and "a blissful treasure trove of gossipy insider details that Dolls fans will swiftly devour". Publishers Weekly called it "exuberant" and "loving". Library Journal wrote "Rebello packs tons of information into this loving look at a cultural and cult phenomenon ... Go ahead: indulge yourself. Fans will love! love! love! and newcomers will enjoy the Hollywood insider aspect". The Washington Post called it "full of surprises and even suspense" and The Hollywood Reporter placed it on its list of 20 books of the summer. The Canberra Times book critic called it "hilarious and informative...Stephen Rebello has written two of my favorite books about movies. And now he's written a third ... a must-read for fans of Susann, fans of movies and fans of pop culture". During its first month of publication, the book was listed on Amazon as #1 Best Seller in such categories as: Entertainment Industry; Movie History & Criticism; Literary Criticism & Theory; and on Amazon Kindle, it became #1 in various categories including #1 New Release in "Sports & Entertainment".
