= Dead Heat (1988 film) =

1988 film by Mark Goldblatt

- Theatrical release poster
- Directed by: Mark Goldblatt
- Written by: Terry Black
- Produced by: David Helpern; Michael L. Meltzer
- Starring: Treat Williams; Joe Piscopo; Darren McGavin; Lindsay Frost; Claire Kirkconnell; Vincent Price
- Cinematography: Robert Yeoman
- Edited by: Harvey Rosenstock
- Music by: Ernest Troost
- Production company: Helpern/Meltzer
- Distributed by: New World Pictures
- Release date: May 6, 1988
- Running time: 84 minutes
- Country: United States
- Language: English
- Box office: $3,588,626

Dead Heat is a 1988 American buddy cop action zombie comedy film directed by Mark Goldblatt and starring Treat Williams, Joe Piscopo, Darren McGavin, Lindsay Frost and Vincent Price. The film is about an LAPD police officer who is murdered while attempting to arrest zombies who have been reanimated by the head of Dante Laboratories in order to carry out violent armed robberies, and decides to get revenge with the help of his former partner.

== Plot ==
Detectives Roger Mortis and Doug Bigelow are called to the scene of a rather violent jewelry store robbery. The robbers take on a squadron of police in a messy shootout, but neither seems affected when they are riddled with bullets. Thanks to the combined, albeit extreme measures of Mortis and Bigelow, they are able to take out the criminals. Narrowly avoiding termination, their captain assigns them to the investigation of a string of violent robberies, with six occurring in the span of two weeks.

Meanwhile, a coroner friend of Roger's, Rebecca informs the detectives that the two bodies they had brought in had previously been to the morgue: not only do they have autopsy scars, but she herself clearly remembers performing the autopsy and has pictures to prove it, suggesting that they simply got up and left the morgue of their own volition.

There is a preservative chemical compound found in the bodies that connect the pair of detectives to a company that had ordered a great amount of it recently. Mortis and Bigelow investigate and meet the company's head public relations person, Randi James who gives them a tour of the facility. When Doug wanders off to investigate a suspicious room, he encounters the reanimated corpse of a biker on a strange machine. A fight ensues, Roger comes to aid his partner, and in the fray, he is knocked into a decompression room used to humanely kill failed test animals and is asphyxiated to death when an unknown person activates the room.

Encountering the machine, and realizing it is capable of bringing people back from the dead, Rebecca and Doug successfully bring Roger back from the dead. He says he feels fine, yet he has no heart beat and his skin is cold to the touch, Rebecca surmises he has about twelve hours before the reanimation process ends and he dissolves into a puddle of mush. Roger decides to take this time to find and exact his vengeance on the person who killed him, as well as solve the case he and Doug are working on. They go to Randi's house just shortly before she is attacked by two more undead thugs, which the partners are able to subdue. Randi says that she is the daughter of a rich industrialist, and the owner of the company she works for until his death, Arthur P. Loudermilk.

The two of them pay another visit to Rebecca, who says that she might have found a way to keep Roger in healthy condition indefinitely, but the unsure nature of the theory has him decide to spend his final hours finding the man who killed him. Doug splits from Roger, agreeing to meet back at Randi's home, while Roger and Randi pay a visit to Loudermilk's tomb. Randi admits she's not his daughter, more a protégé or daughter he'd never had. While there, they encounter a numeric code, which Roger discovers later is a vital clue. Upon returning to Randi's home, they find Doug dead, having been suspended and drowned in a fish tank for some time. Randi tells Roger that she too is undead, having been one of Loudermilk's first test subjects for resurrection, shortly before abruptly dissolving while asking for Roger's forgiveness.

Roger confronts the head coroner Dr. Ernest McNab, Rebecca's boss, who was linked to the secret numeric code that Roger had found. Roger also has determined that McNab reanimated the robbers to steal for him all while keeping his hands clean, in addition to killing Doug and himself. But McNab turns the tables on Roger, capturing him, then locking him in an ambulance with Rebecca's dead body, after killing her, in order to wait out his last hour to dissolution. He releases the brakes on the ambulance and puts it in neutral, sending it careening down the highway into a massive collision, from which he emerges, even more zombified and scarred almost beyond recognition. He returns to the laboratory where McNab and a resurrected Loudermilk are pitching the resurrection machine to a group of very rich clients. Mortis charges in and in the ensuing crossfire between him and McNab's men a few of the rich clients are killed, leaving Loudermilk cowering in a corner.

McNab reveals a test subject; Doug, resurrected by the machine. But because he's been dead for hours, the brain deterioration leaves him little more than an obedient zombie with no memory of who Roger is. Before he can obey McNab's orders to kill Mortis, however, Roger manages to trigger Doug's short-term memory and bring him back to normal. The pair go after McNab who immediately kills himself before they can do anything. Roger and Doug put McNab onto the resurrection table and resurrect him. But to exact revenge, Roger starts the resurrection process again and it overloads, causing a screaming McNab to explode in the machine. Despite Loudermilk's pleas and promises of eternal life, the pair then destroy the machine completely, leaving the room pondering about the afterlife and reincarnation; Doug's fond wish of being reincarnated as a girl's bicycle seat intriguing the both of them. The film ends with Roger stating, "This could be the end of a beautiful friendship."

== Cast ==
- Treat Williams as Roger Mortis
- Joe Piscopo as Doug Bigelow
- Lindsay Frost as Randi James
- Darren McGavin as Dr. Ernest McNab
- Vincent Price as Arthur P. Loudermilk
- Clare Kirkconnell as Dr. Rebecca Smythers
- Keye Luke as Mr. Thule
- Robert Picardo as Lieutenant Herzog
- Mel Stewart as Captain Mayberry
- Professor Toru Tanaka as Butcher
- Martha Quinn as Newscaster
- Shane Black as Patrolman
- Beth Toussaint as Lab Technician
- Ron Taylor as Shoot Out Zombie

== Production ==
According to The Hollywood Reporter's chart from 1 September 1987, principal photography began on Dead Heat on 19 August 1987 in Southern California. The Los Angeles Times mentioned Darren Star as a writer on the film along with Terry Black. The film's credits only list Black as the screenwriter.

== Release ==
Dead Heat opened in Los Angeles and New York on May 6, 1988. In the Philippines, the film was released as Iron Cops on November 10, 1988.

== Reception ==
Dead Heat was heavily panned by film critics from The New York Times and the Los Angeles Times. The film has an 11% rating on Rotten Tomatoes from 9 critics.

== See also ==
- List of horror films of 1988
