= When We Were Young (film) =

1989 film

- Genre: Drama
- Written by: Richard and Esther Shapiro
- Directed by: Daryl Duke
- Starring: Ronny Cox
- Music by: Peter Matz
- Country of origin: United States
- Original language: English

Production
- Executive producers: Richard and Esther Shapiro
- Producer: George Eckstein
- Cinematography: Bill Butler
- Editors: David Saxon; Mark S. Westmore
- Running time: 100 minutes

Original release
- Network: NBC
- Release: July 17, 1989

When We Were Young, also known as That Magic Moment and Moments, is a 1989 television film directed by Daryl Duke and starring Ronny Cox. It was written by Richard and Esther Shapiro.

== Plot ==
California, June 1959. Paige Farrell (Lindsay Frost), a wealthy young femme fatale, has just graduated from high school and is now celebrating at rich classmate Lee's (Dylan Walsh) mansion. He tries to seduce her, but Paige ignores his affections due to her relationship with working class boy Michael Stefanos (Grant Show). Michael himself is quite popular with the opposite sex as well, as even Paige's mousy best friend Ellen Reese (Cynthia Gibb) admits that she fantasizes about him. At the same party, aspiring singer Linda Rosen (Jane Krakowski) - known for having had many bed partners - tries to perform a song, but stage fright causes her to be bullied off the stage. Vulnerable, she gives into inexperienced Alex Twining's (Jace Alexander) attempts to court her. They are about to have sex in a motel, when Linda starts to vomit, ruining the night. Later at night, some of the students drive home and get into a car accident, killing Phillip and Cecily, a beloved couple who were set to marry. Ben Kirkland (Steven Weber), who owned the car, feels guilty for having allowed them to drive the car even though they were drunk.

Sixteen months later in New England, the group is now focussing on their future. Paige's powerful and intimidating father Matthew (Ronny Cox) is not satisfied with his daughter's boyfriend Michael, who now works in a garage with high school friend Virgil Hawkins (Eriq La Salle). When he finds out that Paige and Michael are engaged, he tries to prevent his daughter from marrying a garage worker by firing Michael's father (who previously worked for him). Michael is enraged that his father has been fired because of a personal conflict, and promises to one day destroy Matthew. Paige, however, continues to support her father and breaks the engagement. Along with Virgil, Michael comes up with plans to destroy Farrell's business, but his father warns him not to get involved with him. Nevertheless, Michael gets closer to the Farrell office through sleeping with Ellen, who now works as his secretary.

Quickly, Paige starts to miss Michael and starts to doubt about her father's integrity at work. She arranges a passionate weekend with Michael at the beach, which abruptly ends when Paige announces that she will marry Lee, and move to Boston. Heartbroken, Michael merges with Farrell's biggest competition: Bartman. Meanwhile, Ben and Alex are upset with the newly announced engagement as well, and aspire to break up the couple. Ellen has other worries, as she realizes that she is pregnant. Michael promises to marry her as soon as she has money, which he tells her he can arrange if she steals personal information from Farrell. Ellen is offended that Michael is asking such from her, and realizes now that she is a simple tool for him to get closer to Farrell.

At Paige and Lee's wedding, Ellen enrages Michael by informing him that she will get an abortion. When Lee gets in the middle, Michael throws a fight, shocking all the guests. Michael later apologizes to everyone, and makes peace with the wedding, as does Ben. At the end, Michael and Ellen announce their engagement, and Ben, Alex and Virgil leave town for the South.

== Cast ==
- Grant Show as Michael Stefanos
- Lindsay Frost as Paige Farrell
- Ronny Cox as Matthew Farrell
- Cynthia Gibb as Ellen Reese
- Steven Weber as Ben Kirkland
- Jace Alexander as Alex Twining
- Dylan Walsh as Lee Jameson
- Eriq La Salle as Virgil Hawkins
- Jane Krakowski as Linda Rosen
