= Hitchcock (film) =

2012 film by Sacha Gervasi

- Theatrical release poster
- Directed by: Sacha Gervasi
- Screenplay by: John J. McLaughlin
- Based on: Alfred Hitchcock and the Making of Psycho by Stephen Rebello
- Produced by: Ivan Reitman; Tom Pollock; Joe Medjuck; Tom Thayer; Alan Barnette
- Starring: Anthony Hopkins; Helen Mirren; Scarlett Johansson; Toni Collette; Danny Huston; Jessica Biel; James D'Arcy; Michael Wincott
- Cinematography: Jeff Cronenweth
- Edited by: Pamela Martin
- Music by: Danny Elfman
- Production companies: The Montecito Picture Company; Cold Spring Pictures
- Distributed by: Fox Searchlight Pictures
- Release dates: November 1, 2012 (AFI Fest); November 23, 2012 (United States)
- Running time: 98 minutes
- Country: United States
- Language: English
- Budget: $15 million
- Box office: $27 million

Hitchcock is a 2012 American biographical romantic drama film directed by Sacha Gervasi. Based on Stephen Rebello's Alfred Hitchcock and the Making of Psycho, it charts the relationship between Alfred Hitchcock and his wife, Alma Reville, during the filming of Psycho in 1959. Hitchcock premiered at the AFI Fest on November 1, 2012, and was released in the US on November 23 by Fox Searchlight Pictures. It grossed $27 million against a $15 million budget.

== Plot ==
In 1959, Alfred Hitchcock opens his latest film, North by Northwest, to both critical and commercial success, but is troubled by a reporter's insinuation that he should retire. Seeking to reclaim the artistic daring of his youth, Hitchcock turns down film proposals, including Casino Royale and The Diary of Anne Frank, in favor of a horror novel called Psycho by Robert Bloch, based on the real-life crimes of murderer Ed Gein. Gein appears in sequences throughout the film, in which he seems to prompt Hitchcock's imagination regarding the Psycho story or act as some function of Hitchcock's subconscious mind.

Hitchcock's wife and artistic collaborator, Alma, is no more enthusiastic about the idea than his colleagues, especially since she is being lobbied by their writer friend, Whitfield Cook, to look at his own screenplay. However, she warms to Hitchcock's proposal, suggesting the innovative plot turn of killing the female lead early in the film. The studio heads at Paramount Pictures prove more difficult to persuade, forcing Hitchcock to finance the film personally and use his Alfred Hitchcock Presents television crew (over at competitor Revue/Universal) to shoot the film, his last under contract to Paramount.

The pressures of the production, such as dealing with Geoffrey Shurlock of the Motion Picture Association of America, and Hitchcock's lecherous habits, such as when they confer with the female lead, Janet Leigh, annoy Alma. She begins a personal writing collaboration with Whitfield Cook on his screenplay at his beach house without Hitchcock's knowledge. Hitchcock eventually discovers what she has been doing and suspects her of having an affair. This concern affects Hitchcock's work on Psycho.

Alma temporarily takes over production of the film when Hitchcock is bedridden after collapsing from overwork, working on a sequence which included a complicated process shot showing Detective Arbogast's demise, with Alma's specification of a 35 mm lens, instead of the 50 mm lens preferred by Hitchcock for this film. Gein draws Hitchcock's attention to sand on his bathroom floor, the quantity of which reveals how much time Alma has been spending at the beach house with Whitfield Cook. Hitchcock eventually confronts Alma and asks her if she is having an affair. Alma angrily denies it.

After his recovery, Hitchcock expresses his disappointment to Vera Miles at how she didn't follow through on his plan to make her the next biggest star after Grace Kelly, but Miles says she is happy with her family life.

Hitchcock's cut of Psycho is poorly received by the studio executives, while Alma discovers Whitfield having sex with a younger woman at his beach house. Hitchcock and Alma reconcile, and they work together in the film's editing room. Their renewed collaboration yields results, culminating in Alma persuading Hitchcock to accept Bernard Herrmann's suggestion for adding harsh strings score to the shower scene.

After maneuvering Shurlock into leaving the film's content largely intact, Hitchcock learns the studio is only going to open the film in two theaters. Hitchcock arranges for special theater instructions to pique the public's interest such as forbidding admittance after the film begins. At the film's premiere, Hitchcock first views the audience from the projection booth, looking out through its small window at them. Hitchcock then waits in the lobby for the audience's reaction to the shower scene, conducting slashing motions as they scream on cue. The film is rewarded with an enthusiastic reception.

With the film's screening so well received, Hitchcock publicly thanks his wife for helping make it possible and they affirm their love and partnership. At the conclusion at his home, Hitchcock addresses the audience noting Psycho proved a major high point of his career and he is currently pondering his next project. A raven lands on his shoulder hinting at his next motion picture, The Birds.

The final title cards say that Hitchcock directed six more films after Psycho, none of which would eclipse its commercial success, and although he never won an Oscar, the American Film Institute awarded him its Life Achievement Award in 1979: an award that he claimed he shared, as he had his life, with his wife, Alma.

== Cast ==
- Anthony Hopkins as Alfred Hitchcock
- Helen Mirren as Alma Reville
- Scarlett Johansson as Janet Leigh
- Toni Collette as Peggy Robertson
- Danny Huston as Whitfield Cook
- Jessica Biel as Vera Miles
- Michael Stuhlbarg as Lew Wasserman
- James D'Arcy as Anthony Perkins
- Michael Wincott as Ed Gein
- Kurtwood Smith as Geoffrey Shurlock
- Richard Portnow as Barney Balaban
- Ralph Macchio as Joseph Stefano
- Wallace Langham as Saul Bass
- Paul Schackman as Bernard Herrmann
- Richard Chassler as Martin Balsam
- Josh Yeo as John Gavin
- John Lacy as First Guard

== Production ==
=== Development ===
In 2005, it was reported that A&E would produce a television film or miniseries based on Stephen Rebello's book Alfred Hitchcock and the Making of Psycho. Subsequently, the book was optioned as a major motion picture. In 2007, the Montecito Picture Company, owned by Ivan Reitman and Tom Pollock, set up a first-look deal with Paramount Pictures, the original distributor of Psycho. However, after four years of development at Paramount, production moved to Fox Searchlight Pictures.

Sacha Gervasi was in negotiations to direct the dramatic motion picture in November 2011. Early the next month, Gervasi signed on as director with Anthony Hopkins and Helen Mirren attached to star as Alfred Hitchcock and Alma Reville, respectively. Black Swan co-writer John J. McLaughlin wrote the first screenplay drafts; subsequently, Rebello wrote additional uncredited drafts that shifted the story's focus away from Ed Gein and instead toward the complex personal and professional relationship of Hitchcock and his wife, Reville, during the filming of Psycho.

=== Casting ===
Much of the film's casting was announced in March 2012. Scarlett Johansson and James D'Arcy played the stars of Psycho, Janet Leigh and Anthony Perkins. Later that month Jessica Biel was cast as Vera Miles. Additional cast members included Toni Collette as the director's trusted assistant Peggy Robertson, Danny Huston as screenwriter-playwright Whitfield Cook, Michael Stuhlbarg as powerful agent and studio boss Lew Wasserman, Michael Wincott as serial killer Ed Gein, Ralph Macchio as screenwriter Joseph Stefano, Richard Portnow as Paramount Pictures boss Barney Balaban, and Wallace Langham as graphic designer Saul Bass.

=== Filming ===
Principal photography for the film began on April 13 in Los Angeles, with the film retitled as Hitchcock. Filming was wrapped up on May 31 after the completion of a scene set during Psycho's New York City premiere on June 16, 1960.

=== Music ===
Danny Elfman composed the film's score. Elfman had previously rerecorded Bernard Herrmann's original score to Psycho in 1998 for Gus Van Sant's 1998 shot-for-shot remake.

The soundtrack album to the film was released by Sony Classical on December 14, 2012.

== Release ==
Hitchcock had a limited release on November 23, 2012, for the film to contend during Oscar season. The film had its world premiere as the opening film of AFI Fest 2012 on November 1 with a gala at Grauman's Chinese Theatre in Hollywood.

Hitchcock was released onto DVD and Blu-ray on March 12, 2013, by 20th Century Fox Home Entertainment. The home media releases contain several making-of featurettes as well as a commentary between director Sacha Gervasi and author Stephen Rebello, a deleted scene, and the film's theatrical trailer.

== Reception ==
=== Box office ===
Hitchcock has earned an estimated $24.7 million worldwide. During its opening on Thanksgiving weekend, the film debuted in 17 theaters and grossed an average of $16,924 per theater.

=== Critical response ===
Review aggregator Rotten Tomatoes gives an approval rating of 59% based on 213 reviews and an average rating of 6.1/10. The website's critical consensus reads: "Though it suffers from tonal inconsistency and a lack of truly insightful retrospection, Hitchcock is elevated by inspired performances from its two distinguished leads". On Metacritic, the film has a score of 55 out of 100 based on 40 critics, indicating "mixed or average" reviews.

Soon after the film's world premiere at the AFI Fest 2012, the first reviews of Hitchcock were published. Tom O'Neil of The Huffington Post wrote: "When the film unspooled at AFI Fest on Thursday night, the audience burst into wild huzzahs at the end. This Hitchcock is so well made, so much fun and so suspenseful that it would make the original Hitchcock proud ... It's a serious contender for Best Picture, Lead Actor, Lead Actress, Adapted Screenplay, Makeup, Music Score, and maybe Art Direction". John Patterson of The Guardian called the film "clever and witty"; "the making of Psycho is depicted in detail without our seeing one frame of the completed movie" and concluding "it lives and breathes through Hopkins and Mirren".

Upon its theatrical release, Mary Pols of Time called the film "a feel-good frolic, which is fine for anyone who prefers their Hitchcock history tidied up, absent the megalomania, the condescending cruelty and tendency to sexual harassment that caused his post-Psycho blonde discovery Tippi Hedren to declare him 'a mean, mean man'". Roger Ebert of the Chicago Sun-Times gave the film a positive review and felt that the film depended most on Helen Mirren's portrayal of Alma Reville, which he found to be "warm and effective".

The Atlantic's Govindini Murty called the film "smart and entertaining" and also provided a cultural guide to the themes, personalities, and cinematic references in the film, from German Expressionism to the paintings of Edward Hopper.

Many critics compared the film to the HBO biopic The Girl, which was released a month earlier and detailed Hitchcock making The Birds and Marnie. Justin Chang of Variety wrote that "the comparatively frothy Hitchcock offers a more sympathetic, even comedic assessment of the man behind the portly silhouette". Todd McCarthy of The Hollywood Reporter also made note that the film "brings a measure of authenticity entirely missing from The Girl". When writing about the film as a whole, McCarthy said, "Hitchcock might be a work of fantasy and speculation as much as it is history and biography, but as an interpretation of a major talent's inner life and imagination, it's undeniably lively and provocative".

=== Accolades ===
Award	Category	Recipients	Result	Ref.
Academy Awards	Best Makeup and Hairstyling	Howard Berger, Peter Montagna and Martin Samuel	Nominated	
Alliance of Women Film Journalists	Actress Defying Age and Ageism	Helen Mirren	Nominated	
British Academy Film Awards	Best Actress	Helen Mirren	Nominated	
British Academy Film Awards	Best Makeup and Hair		Nominated	
Dallas-Fort Worth Film Critics Association	Best Actress	Helen Mirren	Nominated	
Golden Globe Awards	Best Motion Picture Actress – Drama	Helen Mirren	Nominated	
Houston Film Critics Society	Best Score		Nominated	
London Film Critics Circle	British Actress of the Year	Helen Mirren	Nominated	
Phoenix Film Critics Society	Best Actor	Anthony Hopkins	Nominated	
Phoenix Film Critics Society	Best Original Score	Danny Elfman	Nominated	
Saturn Awards	Best Independent Film		Nominated	
Saturn Awards	Best Actress	Helen Mirren	Nominated	
Saturn Awards	Best Make-Up	Gregory Nicotero, Howard Berger, Peter Montagna and Julie Hewitt	Nominated	
Screen Actors Guild Awards	Best Actress	Helen Mirren	Nominated	
St. Louis Gateway Film Critics Association	Best Actress	Helen Mirren	Nominated	
St. Louis Gateway Film Critics Association	Best Scene	Anthony Hopkins in lobby conducting to music/audience’s reaction during “Psycho” shower scene	Won	
Washington DC Area Film Critics Association	Best Actress	Helen Mirren	Nominated	

== See also ==
- The Girl, a 2012 BBC/HBO biographical television film starring Toby Jones as Hitchcock about the making of The Birds and Marnie.

== Works cited ==
- NPR Staff (December 18, 2012). "Fact Checking 'Hitchcock': The Man, The Movie and the Myth". NPR.
