= A Child's Cry for Help =

1994 television film directed by Sandor Stern

- Genre: Drama
- Teleplay by: Jan Jaffe Kahn; Sandor Stern
- Story by: Jan Jaffe Kahn
- Directed by: Sandor Stern
- Starring: Pam Dawber; Veronica Hamel; Zachary Charles; Daniel Hugh Kelly; Lisa Jakub; Cynthia Martells; Daniel Benzali
- Theme music composer: Joseph LoDuca
- Country of origin: United States
- Original language: English

Production
- Executive producers: Ronnie D. Clemmer; Richard P. Kughn; Bill Pace
- Producers: Ronald J. Kahn; David C. Thomas
- Production location: Denver
- Cinematography: Frank Beascoechea; Robert Seaman
- Editor: Caroline Biggerstaff
- Running time: 110 minutes
- Production companies: Hallmark Entertainment; Longbow Productions; Ronald J. Kahn Productions

Original release
- Network: NBC
- Release: November 14, 1994

A Child's Cry for Help is a 1994 American made-for-television drama film starring Pam Dawber and Veronica Hamel, with a supporting role by a young Tobey Maguire.

== Plot ==
A recent transplant from California, Dr. Paula Spencer has just lost her husband and is about to begin her new job at a local hospital. While she is there, a seemingly loving mother, Monica Shaw, brings her son, Eric, in for treatment for his illness. But Dr. Spencer suspects that there is something wrong, and theorizes that Monica is deliberately and abusively making her son sick all the time so that she could have him admitted to the hospital for all of the attention that it gives her. However, hospital administrators are skeptical, and when Eric's young roommate also develops a similar illness, it only serves to make them even more dismissive.

Adding to Dr. Spencer's stress is her troubled relationship with rebellious teenage daughter, Amanda, who is still grieving over the loss of her father and trying to fit in at a new school. To top it off, the two are later victims of a robbery by the woman Dr. Spencer hired as a housekeeper, whose take included some irreplaceable jewelry Amanda had received as gifts from her late father.

When Dr. Spencer decides to ban Monica from being around her ill son and get child services to help him, Monica gets back by trying to get her and the hospital sued. Some of the other employees at the hospital board disagree with Dr. Spencer's diagnosis of Munchausen Syndrome by Proxy by thinking she is overreacting. Even when Monica is kept away from Eric, he is getting worse and no better.

With what seems like the whole hospital against her, Dr. Spencer takes on the help of a lawyer and the case goes to court. The court case determines whether social services will take care of the son or whether Monica can keep the child. However, Dr. Spencer believes that losing the court case will mean Eric's death.

At first, things seem to be going in Monica's favor. However, an unexpected break occurs when a young patient tells Amanda (who works as a candy striper at the hospital) that she saw Monica in Eric's room the night before, thus violating the restraining order against her. The next day in court, the prosecution drops a bombshell with the revelation that between 1989 and 1994, while he and his mother lived in Seattle, Eric had been admitted to various hospitals with unexplained abdominal cramps a total of twenty-six times, which was eventually diagnosed as laxative abuse. Furthermore, it is revealed that back in 1982, Monica had a child out of wedlock, who also died of laxative abuse when he was only 18 months old. The revelation of this fact prompts Monica to have a breakdown on the witness stand and results in her losing custody of Eric, who is placed in the care of his grandmother.

Despite her misgivings, satisfied that she had saved Eric's life, Dr. Spencer now realizes she also needs to improve her relationship with Amanda, telling her she loves her and promising to change.
