= Valley of the Dolls (novel) =

1966 novel by Jacqueline Susann

- First hardcover edition
- Author: Jacqueline Susann
- Language: English
- Published: February 10, 1966
- Publisher: Bernard Geis Associates
- Publication place: United States
- Media type: Print (hardback and paperback)
- Pages: 442 pp (hardcover edition)
- ISBN: 1568657145

Valley of the Dolls is the first novel by the American writer Jacqueline Susann. Published in 1966, the book was the best-selling novel of its year. By 2016, it had sold more than 31 million copies, making it one of the all-time best-selling fictional works in publishing history. It received largely negative reviews.

== Plot ==
In 1945 beautiful ingénue Anne Welles moves to New York City to escape the ennui of her Massachusetts hometown. She finds work as a secretary to Henry Bellamy, an entertainment lawyer, and befriends Neely O'Hara, an ebullient vaudevillian and aspiring stage actress. Henry's former employee, Lyon Burke, returns to the agency after World War II, and Anne quickly falls in love with him despite Henry's warning. Meanwhile Anne goes on some dates with a small-time salesman named Allen Cooper, who suddenly reveals that he is a millionaire pretending to be an ordinary person in order to make sure Anne's feelings are genuine. He proposes to Anne and their love story becomes a media sensation.

Anne befriends Helen Lawson, a brilliant, ruthless, unhappy Broadway legend. Neely is hired for Helen's latest show, but Helen takes a dislike to her and minimizes her role. Anne uses her friendship with Lyon to secure Neely a bigger role, and Neely becomes a breakout star; Helen cruelly rejects Anne by revealing the she was only interested in Anne's friendship for the chance at a sexual relationship with Allen's father. Anne also befriends Jennifer North, a kindhearted young actress famous for her attractive figure.

On the night of the show's opening, Anne and Lyon consummate their feelings, and Anne and Allen break up. The production is a massive success. Neely enjoys a meteoric rise to fame and moves to California to begin a film career. Anne's mother dies and Anne returns to her hometown with Lyon, who wants to quit the agency, live in Anne's family home, and write novels. Though Anne loves Lyon deeply, she refuses to move back to Massachusetts. Lyon breaks up with Anne and moves to England to write, leaving Anne heartbroken. Though Anne takes years to move on, she eventually becomes a model for beauty products and starts dating the cosmetics company owner, the older, wealthy Kevin Gillmore.

Meanwhile Jennifer begins a relationship with childish, sex-obsessed singer Tony Polar, but their romance is frequently disrupted by Tony's domineering older sister, Miriam. Jennifer pressures Tony into marrying her and quickly gets pregnant. After reuniting with an increasingly unsympathetic Neely, who is in the midst of an affair, Jennifer becomes dependent on "dolls" (amphetamines and barbiturates) to calm her frayed nerves. Finally, Miriam reveals why she opposed Jennifer and Tony's relationship: Tony has developmental disabilities and the baby will likely inherit them. Devastated, Jennifer has an abortion and agrees to divorce Tony. Jennifer then moves to Europe and finds work in art house films, which, owing to her nudity, are considered soft-core pornography in the United States.

By 1950 Neely has become a celebrated actress, enjoying a lucrative film career and parenting twin sons with her second husband. However, long workdays and the stress over her husband's infidelity (with both men and women) keep her dependent on "dolls", and she is becoming increasingly unpopular with the studio because of her tantrums and walkouts. Neely accidentally overdoses, but makes a full recovery. Still, the studio fires her from the production and replaces her with the boss's young lover. Anne reconnects with Neely; Kevin suggests resurrecting Neely's career by having her sing on a televised spectacular for his brand. Neely at first refuses, but following a successful supper-club performance and a run-in with a belligerent Helen, she agrees. Unable to cope with the demands of the rehearsals, she overdoses to avoid performing. To Anne's distress, Neely disappears to Europe.

In Europe, Jennifer is pressured to undergo plastic surgery, as she has always lied about her age; she is ten years older than her claimed age of 27. Unhappy with her European career and boyfriend, she returns to the United States. Three years later, she gets engaged to an older senator, who she believes loves her for more than her body, and she is excited to get married and have a child. But a routine test reveals that she has breast cancer and will require a mastectomy, and the treatment will likely render her infertile. After her fiancé says he doesn't want children and makes a comment suggesting he's only interested in her body, Jennifer becomes convinced that she will never be loved for who she is. She leaves the hospital and dies by suicide.

Neely reappears in the midst of Jennifer's funeral. She has lost her voice, apparently from psychological issues. After bungling a self-harm attempt, Neely becomes institutionalized, which a guilty Anne pays for. Meanwhile Lyon returns to New York and reconnects with Anne, much to the chagrin of Kevin. Anne is unable to overcome her passion for Lyon and the two begin an affair. Kevin eventually learns of this and breaks up with Anne. Some time later, Neely finds her voice again after an impromptu sanitarium performance with a now-incompetent Tony Polar. Anne works with Henry to get Lyon to abandon his non-starter career as a writer and become a partner at the agency, with Henry lending Lyon money that secretly comes from Anne.

Lyon is initially put off by Neely, who has become obese, but successfully plots her career comeback. Anne and Lyon get married and Anne quickly gets pregnant, but her happiness is short-lived when Neely demands that Lyon escort her everywhere on her comeback tour. Lyon learns from Neely about how Anne secretly lent him money and feels outraged and emasculated. He and Neely begin a brazen public affair. Henry persuades Anne to wait out the humiliation and pretend she knows nothing, assuring her that Lyon will grow tired of Neely and return to her. The affair stretches on for years, with Neely pressuring Lyon to end his marriage. Anne becomes dependent on the "dolls" to relax, but Lyon reluctantly stays with Anne. After repaying Anne's loan, he breaks off the affair (losing Neely as a client in the process) but quickly begins a new one with a teenaged up-and-coming singer. Though Anne finally admits to herself that Lyon will never stop having affairs, she assures herself that she will eventually fall out of love and become numb to all of her pain before reaching for her "dolls" again.

== Background ==
Susann had apparently been thinking about the novel for some time. Some years earlier, she had begun Underneath the Pancake, a show-business novel, with her actress friend Beatrice Cole (c. 1910–1999). Later, she considered writing a novel about drug use in show business to be called The Pink Dolls.

Valley of the Dolls is considered a roman à clef, with its characters based on famous figures such as Judy Garland, Carole Landis, Dean Martin, and Ethel Merman. In 1973, after the publication of her third novel, Susann said: "They can keep calling it that roman à clef. It'll only make my books sell. I don't care". Susann insisted that she began each book with a theme: "Then I start asking, what kind of a personality? And because I have a good ear, I unconsciously pick up certain people".

Susann dedicated the book to her poodle Josephine, and to her husband Irving Mansfield.

== Reception ==
The book was published by Bernard Geis Associates on February 10, 1966, and "took off like a Cape Canaveral space shot".

Publishers Weekly, in an advance review, called the novel "big, brilliant and sensational", if "poorly written". The book received largely negative reviews. Feminist Gloria Steinem criticized the book in the New York Herald Tribune, as did The New York Times. Time magazine called it the "Dirty Book of the Month", and said: "It might more accurately be described as a highly effective sedative, a living doll".

Despite the poor reviews, the book was a runaway commercial success. On May 8, 1966, in its ninth week on the list, the book reached #1 on the New York Times Best Seller List, where it remained for 28 consecutive weeks. With a total of 65 weeks on the list, the book became the best-selling novel of 1966. By the time of Susann's death in 1974, it had entered the Guinness Book of World Records as the best-selling novel in publishing history, with more than 17 million copies sold. By 2016, the book had sold more than 31 million copies.

== In popular culture ==
In Kurt Vonnegut's 1969 novel Slaughterhouse-Five, when Billy Pilgrim is brought to Tralfamadore for the first time and asks for reading material, he is given Valley of the Dolls, which is the only physical copy of an English-speaking book the Tralfamadorians have aboard their spaceship.

In a 1969 episode of That Girl (season 4, episode 11; "Kiss That Girl Goodbye"), the two main characters, Ann Marie and Donald Hollinger, play charades. Donald correctly guesses "Valley of the Dolls" after Ann has only given him the clues of it being four-words and a book title.

In Malcolm in the Middle (season 3, episode 5), Eric's bunk-mate criticizes the book's ending.

In State of Grace (season 2, episode 12), the main characters, Hannah and Grace, are at a bookstore looking at the book's cover and pondering what it's about. Just as they're starting to take a peek inside the book to find out, Grace's mother Tattie snatches the book away and scolds them, saying the book is a "trashy" one for adults and "not for children!"

The tenth track on Marina and the Diamonds' 2012 album Electra Heart is named "Valley of the Dolls"; the lyrics include the line: "in the valley of the dolls, we sleep, got a hole inside of me."

In Chuck Palahniuk's 2018 novel Adjustment Day, the novel's plot is examined alongside several other novels (including Palahniuk's own Fight Club) to find a core plot that they all share.

In the 2021 Stephen King novel Billy Summers, the character Alice Maxwell makes reference to the book.

In the Black Mirror episode "Beyond the Sea", the character of Lana is seen reading the book.

In the 2023 tactical first-person shooter game Ready or Not, one of the levels involving a child sexual abuse sting bears the name of the novel.

In Dead Boy Detectives (season 1, episode 4), the character Edwin Payne calls the book "quite the modern masterpiece."

== Adaptations and character portrayals ==
In 1967, the book was adapted into a film, directed by Mark Robson (Peyton Place), and starring Barbara Parkins as Anne, Patty Duke as Neely, Paul Burke (Lyon), Sharon Tate (Jennifer), and Susan Hayward (Helen). The screenplay was written by Helen Deutsch (National Velvet) and Dorothy Kingsley (Seven Brides for Seven Brothers), and produced by Robson and David Weisbart. Like the book, although the reviews were scathing, the film was an enormous box-office hit, becoming the sixth most popular of the year with $44 million at the domestic box office. Susann, who had a cameo in the film as a news reporter, hated the film. The film became a celebrated cult classic in later years, often cited as a key example of camp in cinema.

Because of the success of the film adaptation, a sequel was rushed into development by Fox in early 1968. Susann provided a title for the film, Beyond the Valley of the Dolls, and a treatment that involved Anne Welles moving into television journalism while attempting to raise her teenage daughter, Julie, as a single mother following another rocky love affair with Lyon Burke. After a year's work by two screenwriters did not result in a script Fox executives wanted to produce, Susann and her husband, Irving Mansfield, who was attached as producer, were removed from the project. Beyond the Valley of the Dolls was instead made and released in 1970 as an unofficial sequel/musical-comedy parody of the first film. Sexploitation filmmaker Russ Meyer produced and directed Beyond from a screenplay by his friend, Chicago Sun-Times film critic Roger Ebert. While a modest box-office hit and later a cult classic, the X-rated film resulted in an ultimately successful lawsuit from Susann and varying levels of embarrassment from future Fox regimes over the film's uses of nudity and violence. Because of the legal issues with Susann, the characters of Anne and Lyon were renamed and recast without Parkins and Burke.

The novel was re-adapted by Fox for television in 1981 as Jacqueline Susann's Valley of the Dolls, a mini-series executive-produced by Susann's widower, Irving Mansfield, and directed by Walter Grauman. This version stars Catherine Hicks, Lisa Hartman, and Veronica Hamel. In 1994 a late-night, syndicated television soap opera, Valley of the Dolls, ran for one season and 65 episodes. The premise was a loose adaptation of the novel. BBC Radio 4 broadcast a 15-episode dramatisation scripted by Yvonne Antrobus over three weeks in August and September 2005. It was part of the Woman's Hour programme's ongoing fifteen-minute daily drama slot, and has been rebroadcast several times on BBC Radio 4 Extra in three 70-minute omnibus episodes.

The creation of the novel, film and the never-made film sequel meant to star Parkins and Burke are the subjects of an acclaimed 2020 non-fiction book written by Stephen Rebello, Dolls! Dolls! Dolls!: Deep Inside Valley of the Dolls, the Most Beloved Bad Book and Movie of All Time.

Character	Valley of the Dolls (1967)	Jacqueline Susann's Valley of the Dolls (1981)	Valley of the Dolls (1994)
Helen Lawson	Susan Hayward	Jean Simmons	Sally Kirkland
Neely O'Hara	Patty Duke	Lisa Hartman	Melissa De Sousa
Jennifer North	Sharon Tate	Veronica Hamel	Colleen Morris
Anne Welles	Barbara Parkins	Catherine Hicks	Sharon Case
