= Calendar Girl Murders =

- Genre: Crime; Drama; Mystery; Thriller
- Written by: Gregory S. Dinallo; Scott Swanton
- Directed by: William A. Graham
- Starring: Tom Skerritt; Sharon Stone; Robert Culp; Barbara Parkins; Alan Thicke; Barbara Bosson; Claudia Christian; Robert Beltran
- Theme music composer: Brad Fiedel
- Country of origin: United States
- Original language: English

Production
- Executive producer: Steve Tisch
- Producers: Jon Avnet; James O'Fallon
- Cinematography: Robert Steadman
- Editor: Ronald J. Fagan
- Running time: 100 minutes
- Production company: Tisch/Avnet Productions Inc.

Original release
- Network: ABC
- Release: April 8, 1984

Calendar Girl Murders is a 1984 television movie directed by William A. Graham and starred Tom Skerritt and Sharon Stone, who played the part of former nude model Cassie Bascomb.

== Plot ==
Millionaire adult magazine publisher Richard Trainor (Robert Culp) is celebrating the success of his new calendar, featuring twelve beautiful nude women. However, the party is ruined when Miss January is pushed off a high-rise hotel. Later in the evening, Miss February is knifed to death. Police Lieutenant Dan Stoner (Tom Skerritt) is assigned to the case and he immediately strikes up a friendship with former nude model Cassie Bascomb (Sharon Stone), who has a history with Trainor and his magazine, and who has since taken a white-collar job in finance. While Dan investigates the case, the models continue to be stalked, with an attack being thwarted by Dan himself at a pool party hosted by Trainor. Cassie's home is burglarized, as the list of suspects narrows to people affiliated with the magazine. Cassie tries to get intimate with Dan, who is married with a teenage son, but he rejects her advance. Cassie resumes modeling for Trainor, which annoys Dan. A man in a van - who turns out to be associated with the magazine - terrorizes the models during a celebrity field day and is apprehended following a brief chase in which is he badly injured, but is murdered in the ICU before he can be interrogated. Another associate of Trainor's is arrested in connection with the murders, but Dan remains unconvinced and begins putting the pieces together. Upon learning that Cassie has been informed of evidence Dan has implicating her own involvement, Dan races home, fearing for his wife's safety. Cassie is revealed to be Trainor's daughter, and the murderer. Dan rescues his wife as police - and Trainor - converge on the Stoner home. Cassie confesses to having wanted Trainor to be a father to her; her post-arrest psychiatric analysis confirms her feelings of abandonment, and history of psychotic episodes dating back to childhood.

== Cast ==
- Sharon Stone as Cassie Bascomb
- Robert Culp as Richard Trainor
- Tom Skerritt as Lt. Dan Stoner
- Barbara Parkins as Cleo Banks
- Alan Thicke as Alan Conti
- Robert Beltran as Mooney
- Barbara Bosson as Nancy
- Claudia Christian as Kara
- Michael C. Gwynne as Krell
- Pat Corley as Tony
- Robert Morse as Nat Couray
- Wendy Kilbourne as Heather English
- Silvana Gallardo as Detective Rose Hernandez
- David L. Crowley as King

== Reception ==
Sue Heal at Radio Times wrote:

A chance to see Sharon Stone on the early road to stardom in this steamy, over-larded tale of a serial killer with a penchant for bumping off centrefolds. Detective Tom Skerritt struggles successfully to keep a straight face in the eye of a storm of hoary clichés, as the meticulous killer works his way through the months like an over-zealous accountant. Misses January and February have bitten the soft-focus dust. Can Miss March possibly survive?
