= Geoffrey Shurlock =

British–American movie industry executive

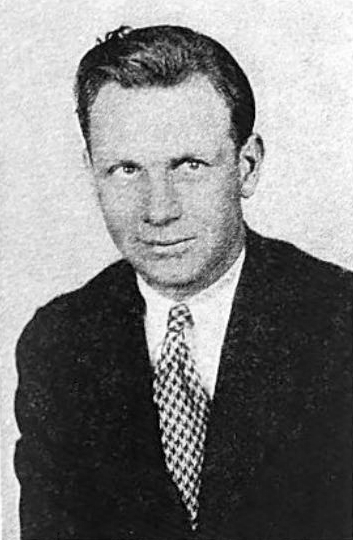
- Born: Geoffrey Manwaring Shurlock; August 1, 1894; Liverpool, England
- Died: April 26, 1976 (aged 81); Woodland Hills, California, US
- Occupation: Motion picture industry executive

Geoffrey Manwaring Shurlock (August 1, 1894 – April 26, 1976) was a British–American motion picture industry executive who served as Hollywood's chief censor as the Director of the Motion Picture Association of America's Production Code Administration from 1954 to 1969, an era when movie producers demanded more freedom from censorship. During the latter years of Shurlock's reign, the Production Code and its seal of approval that was required by most film exhibitors for a movie to be shown was replaced by the ratings system.

== Early life ==
Shurlock was born on August 1, 1894, in Liverpool, England, the son of Charles and Frances (Hallawell) Shurlock. He emigrated to the United States along with his parents in 1901, becoming a naturalized citizen in 1930.

== Career ==
In 1922, he became a secretary to author/screenwriter/composer Rupert Hughes, the uncle of Howard Hughes. After leaving Hughes' employ, he took a job as a story reader with Paramount Pictures in 1926. In his six years at the studio (1926–1932), he had jobs as a scenario editor and an assistant to the vice president in charge of production. He also oversaw foreign language productions.

From 1932 to 1934, he served on the Motion Picture Association of America's studio relations committee. He then became the assistant to Joseph Breen, director of the Production Code Administration overseeing movie censorship. When Breen retired in 1954, Shurlock succeeded him as PCA Director.

== Views ==
Shurlock believed that, "The code is a moral document. It enumerates certain rules which must be followed to ensure that moral values shall not become confused where antisocial or criminal conduct is essential to the telling of the story."

In his New York Times obituary, he was quoted as saying, "The code is a set of self-regulations based on sound morals common to all peoples and all religions. To put it simply, it lays down the thesis that the screen should never be used to make what is basically wrong appear to be right. It assumes that the Ten Commandants are as applicable in the field of the imagination as they are in real life."

He proved more liberal than Breen, and as Hollywood movies began to become increasingly frank in their depiction of life, he tried to adapt. In 1959, he claimed that the movies could receive a seal if it handled a "moral conflict" in the "proper frame of reference" for any subject other than homosexuality, the year that Billy Wilder's classic comedy featuring two male stars in drag Some Like it Hot hit the screen.

== Liberalisation ==
By the mid-1960s, he began to lose control over movie content, when the PCA's attempts to deny the seal of approval to The Pawnbroker in 1965 for nudity and Who's Afraid of Virginia Woolf? for vulgar language were overruled by the Motion Picture Association's Code Review Board. In 1967, Shurlock's PCA denied Metro-Goldwyn-Mayer a seal to distribute Michelangelo Antonioni's Blowup due to frontal nudity.

== Notable censorship attempts ==
Among the notable films Shurlock tried to censor were The Man With the Golden Arm, producer-director Otto Preminger's 1955 film based on Nelson Algren's eponymous National Book Award-winning novel about a drug addict. Preminger had released his 1953 movie comedy The Moon is Blue without the PCA seal, as the PCA under Breen had objected to the language used in the film. Preminger and his distributor, United Artists, decided to book the film before submitting it to the PCA, although depictions of drug addiction were forbidden by the Code, the portrayal of the drug addict by Frank Sinatra was so harrowing, no one would object that it glorified the use of narcotics. The PCA denied the film its seal, United Artists resigned from the MPAA in protest, and the movie was shown in theaters that normally wouldn't show a proscribed film. Three years later, drug addiction was depicted in A Hatful of Rain, a mainstream release from Twentieth Century Fox.

== Pussy Galore ==
Shurlock allowed the character of Pussy Galore to keep her double-entendre name in the 1964 film adaptation of Ian Fleming's James Bond 1959 novel Goldfinger after the name was used in press coverage of Honor Blackman meeting Prince Philip.

In 1968, the MPAA implemented the movie ratings system. He stepped down as Hollywood's chief censor in January 1969 and was named a special consultant to the PCA, a position he held until retiring in 1974.

== Death ==
Shurlock died on April 26, 1976, in Woodland Hills, Los Angeles, California.

== In popular culture ==
He was portrayed by actor Kurtwood Smith in the 2012 movie Hitchcock, which dealt with the production of Alfred Hitchcock's 1960 movie Psycho.
