= Stop at Nothing (1991 film) =

1991 television film directed by Chris Thomson

- Genre: Drama; Thriller
- Written by: Stephen W. Johnson
- Directed by: Chris Thomson
- Starring: Veronica Hamel; Lindsay Frost
- Music by: J. A. C. Redford
- Country of origin: United States
- Original language: English

Production
- Executive producer: Ilene Amy Berg
- Producer: George W. Perkins
- Cinematography: Arch Bryant
- Editor: John A. Martinelli
- Running time: 96 minutes
- Production companies: ABC Productions; Capitol Cities; Empty Chair Productions Inc. Lifetime Television

Original release
- Network: ABC
- Release: March 12, 1991

Stop at Nothing is a 1991 television film directed by Chris Thomson. The thriller, starring Veronica Hamel and Lindsay Frost, premiered on ABC, and has since been frequently aired on Lifetime Television.

== Plot ==
Private detective and former Drug Enforcement agent Parrish (Lindsay Frost) is hired to be a bodyguard for a week to 8-year-old Kimberly Howard (Deborah Ann Gorman), who currently serves the key role in the custody battle of her parents James (Joseph Hacker) and Glenna (Annabella Price). James fears that Glenna will run off with Kimberly, considering that she is losing the battle, is refusing alimony and is advised by the judge to seek psychiatric help. James is awarded temporary custody, and hires Parrish for assistance during his work hours. Parrish does not feel comfortable around children, and Kimberly immediately shows her lack of interest in her. Glenna, meanwhile, is heartbroken over having lost the case, and tells her lawyer that she hates how James can abuse Kimberly on a daily basis now. Her lawyer feels sorry for the woman and puts her in contact with former reporter Nettie Forbes (Veronica Hamel), who has spent a year in prison for attempting to murder the man who had abused and killed her daughter. Since then, Nettie specializes in helping mothers to kidnap their children from their abusive husbands, and she offers Glenna a new identity following the kidnapping of Kimberly.

Meanwhile, Parrish grows closer to Kimberly and even tells her about her love of her life: a former colleague who was shot and killed by a man who they were arresting. Their conversation is interrupted by a sudden visit from Nettie and Glenna, who have Parrish held at gunpoint, and take Kimberly. While they head out to a safehouse and come up with a new name, Parrish is criticized by her colleagues for having failed her job. James insists that Parrish try to find Kimberly, informing her that she is not safe with Glenna, who was institutionalized three years ago following a manic-depressive episode. Parrish's partner Sgt. Jake Morris (Robert Desiderio) – with whom Parrish has had a romantic past – eventually arrests Nettie, but she refuses to talk while being held. Instead of being charged, Nettie is released, enabling the police to follow her every move. Nettie, however, loses them via a drive-in, and surprises Glenna with a new birth certificate, that of Carol Davidson.

While Nettie and Glenna prepare to leave for New Mexico, Parrish locates them and begins a dangerous car chase. Glenna finally gives up and gets out the car to stop Parrish, while Nettie drives off with Kimberly. Nettie leaves Kimberly to stay with her friend, but Kimberly does not feel safe and cries out for her mother. Back at the station, Parrish looks into the rape allegations against James. Through Glenna's lawyer, Parrish finds out that Kimberly brought up the abuse claims herself, and that Glenna's so-called mental illness is nothing more than a depression. Even though there is no hard proof for the abuse, Parrish slowly starts to believe the lawyer, and offers to help Nettie to reconcile Glenna with Kimberly. Nettie wants to help Glenna break out of jail, but this is not an option for Parrish, who does not want to jeopardize her career.

Meanwhile, the FBI locates Kimberly through one of Nettie's posted letters. Parrish tries to help her out by warning Kimberly's caretaker Victoria before the FBI can get to her, but Victoria is unavailable, and the police are able to take Kimberly. As soon as she is reconciled with James, Parrish offers her babysitting services to continue the battle to help Glenna. Charges against Glenna are dropped on condition that she leaves the state, and Nettie is also released from any allegations as well. Shortly after, following a confession about the child abuse from Kimberly herself, Parrish arranges for Glenna to leave the state with Kimberly. To assure herself of not losing her job, Nettie shows up and fakes to have cuffed her, before having kidnapped Kimberly. Believing that she was part of the kidnapping, James threatens to sue Parrish, but she assures him that she will tell everyone about the abuse if he does.

== Cast ==
- Veronica Hamel as Annette 'Nettie' Forbes
- Lindsay Frost as Sarah McConnell Parrish
- David Ackroyd as Agent Conroy
- Robert Desiderio as Sergeant Jake Morris
- Joseph Hacker as James Howard
- Deborah Ann Gorman as Kimberly Howard
- Caroline McWilliams as A.J. Parker
- Annabella Price as Glenna Howard
- Francis X. McCarthy as Dean Bowles
- Lou Beatty Jr. as Sergeant Wade
- Ingrid Oliu as Ofelia
- Al Ruscio as Judge Quentin
