= Lindsay Frost =

American actress (born 1962)

- Born: June 4, 1962 (age 64); Minneapolis, Minnesota, U.S.
- Occupations: Actress; artist
- Years active: 1983–2014
- Spouse: Rick Giolito (m. 1988)
- Children: 2, including Lucas Giolito
- Father: Warren Frost

Lindsay Frost (born June 4, 1962) is an American former actress.

== Early life ==
Frost was born in Minneapolis, Minnesota, and grew up elsewhere in Minnesota. She is the daughter of actor Warren Frost.

== Career ==
On television, Frost played the role of Betsy Stewart Andropoulos on the daytime soap opera As the World Turns from 1984 to 1988. She also played Dr. Jessie Lane in the drama Birdland, Sergeant Helen Sullivan in the crime drama High Incident, Fay Pernovick in the drama Nightmare Cafe, and Claire Stark in the crime drama Shark.She appeared on Crossing Jordan in the recurring role of Maggie from 2001 to 2006. She also guest starred in a number of series including Lost, Boston Legal, Shark, CSI: Crime Scene Investigation, CSI: Miami, and Frasier.

Frost also appeared in the cult films Dead Heat (1988) as Randi James, and in The Ring (2002) as Ruth Embry.

On Broadway, Frost appeared in M. Butterfly (1988).

== Personal life ==
Frost is married to video game producer Rick Giolito. She has two sons, Lucas Giolito, a Major League Baseball pitcher, and Casey Giolito, an actor.

== Filmography ==
Film
Year	Title	Role	Notes
1988	Dead Heat	Randi James	
1993	Monolith	Terri Flynn	
1999	Treasure of Pirate's Point	Sally	Video
2002	Collateral Damage	Anne Brewer	
2002	The Ring	Ruth	
2003	Learning Curves	Lisa Ducharme	

Television
Year	Title	Role	Notes
1983	Hill Street Blues	Reporter	Episode: "Ba-Bing, Ba-Bing"
1984–1987	As the World Turns	Elizabeth "Betsy" Stewart Andropoulos	Recurring role
1989	L.A. Law	Stephanie Hall	Episode: "The Plane Mutiny"
1989	Father Dowling Mysteries	Kathy Luciani	Episode: "The Mafia Priest Mystery: Part 1"; Episode: "The Mafia Priest Mystery: Part 2"
1989	When We Were Young	Paige Farrell	TV movie
1989	Lady in the Corner	Susan Dawson	TV movie
1989–1990	Mancuso, F.B.I.	Kristen Carter	20 episodes; First episode, credited only
1990	The Great Los Angeles Earthquake	Laurie Parker	TV movie
1991	Stop at Nothing	Sarah McConnell Parrish	TV movie
1991	Murder, She Wrote	Dawn Bickford	Episode: "Thursday's Child"
1991	Palomino	Samantha Taylor	TV movie
1992	Nightmare Cafe	Fay Peronivic	6 episodes
1992	In the Shadow of a Killer	Stacy Mitchell	TV movie
1992	Calendar Girl, Cop, Killer? The Bambi Bembenek Story	Laurie Bembenek	TV movie
1993	seaQuest DSV	Savannah Rossovich	Episode: "Treasure of the Mind"
1994	Birdland	Dr. Jessie Lane	Episode: "Grand Delusion"
1995	OP Center	Pamela Bluestone	TV movie
1995	Dead by Sunset	Sara Gordon	TV miniseries
1996	Smoke Jumpers	Rene Mackey	TV movie
1996	OverBlood	Millie (voice)	Video game
1996–1997	High Incident	Sgt. Helen Sullivan	22 episodes
1997	Frasier	Samantha Pierce	Episode: "My Fair Frasier"; Episode: "Desperately Seeking Closure"
1998	Mind Games	Karen Sorenson	TV movie
1998	My Father's Shadow: The Sam Sheppard Story	Marilyn Sheppard	TV movie
1999	Too Rich: The Secret Life of Doris Duke	Doris Duke (age 20s to 50s)	TV miniseries
2000	The Geena Davis Show	Abby	Episode: "Jealousy"
2000–2001	Bull	Caroly Roberts-Cox	6 episodes
2001	Frasier	Samantha Pierce	Episode: "Don Juan in Hell: Part 2"
2001–2006	Crossing Jordan	Maggie Macy	9 episodes
2002	CSI: Crime Scene Investigation	Atty. Marjorie Westcott	Episode: "The Accused Is Entitled"
2002	MDs	Linda Clark	Episode: "Family Secrets"
2003	Family Curse		TV movie
2003	Judging Amy	ASA Natalie Blake	Episode: "Ex Parte of Five"
2003	The Elizabeth Smart Story	Lois Smart	TV movie
2004	CSI: Miami	Joanne Henderson	Episode: "Invasion"
2005	Lost	Sabrina Carlyle	Episode: "Abandoned"
2006	Boston Legal	Beth Guttman	Episode: "Spring Fever"; Episode: "BL: Los Angeles"
2006	Shark	Claire Stark	Episode: "Pilot"
2006	The Unit	Senator Webb	Episode: "200th Hour"; Episode: "The Broom Cupboard"
2007	The Unit	Senator Webb	Episode: "Bedfellows"
2007	Without a Trace	Christine Woods	Episode: "Res Ipsa"
2011	Harold and the North Pole	Narrator	Video game
2012	Harold and the Purple Crayon	Narrator	Video game
