= Alfred Hitchcock and the Making of Psycho =

Book by Stephen Rebello

- Author: Stephen Rebello
- Language: English
- Genre: Non-fiction
- Publisher: St. Martin's Griffin
- Publication date: April 15, 1990
- Publication place: United States
- Media type: Print (hardback & paperback)
- Pages: 224 (first edition, hardback)
- ISBN: 0-312-20785-9
- OCLC: 40395537

Alfred Hitchcock and the Making of Psycho is a 1990 non-fiction book by Stephen Rebello. It details the creation of director Alfred Hitchcock's 1960 thriller Psycho. The 2012 American biographical drama film based on this non-fiction book is titled Hitchcock. The film was released on November 23, 2012.

The book was first published on April 15, 1990, by Dembner Books, and distributed by W. W. Norton & Company. Stephen Rebello researched the film thoroughly through Hitchcock's personal records and archives, and he interviewed virtually every surviving cast and crew member. Prior to the book's publication, Rebello's initial research appeared as a 22-page article in the April 1986 issue of Cinefantastique entitled "Psycho: The Making of Alfred Hitchcock's Masterpiece". That research was greatly expanded and deepened for the book version.

== Synopsis ==
The book details Hitchcock's acquisition of the original novel by Robert Bloch to his work with two different screenwriters, casting, filming, editing, scoring, and promotion. Alfred Hitchcock and the Making of Psycho shows the daily lives of the filmmakers, who believed they were making a modestly budgeted, black-and-white shocker, representing a radical departure from the elegant, suspenseful films that had made director Hitchcock's reputation, including Rope, Rear Window, To Catch a Thief, The Man Who Knew Too Much and North by Northwest.

The project, which Hitchcock tackled in part to compete with financially successful, low-budget, youth-oriented horror movies, went on to astound many by becoming a cultural watershed, an international box-office success, a film classic, and a forerunner of the violent, disorienting films, and real-events of the turbulent 1960s and '70s.

== Publication history ==
Alfred Hitchcock and the Making of Psycho was initially distributed in hardcover print by W.W. Norton for Dembner Books on April 15, 1990, in the United States. A trade paperback edition was released in the United States in 1998 by St. Martin's Griffin. Subsequently, the book has been published in hardcover and paperback by Marion Boyars Limited in Great Britain and Australia. It has also been published in translated international editions in Japan by Byakuya Shobo, France, Germany and in Italy by Il Castoro. The book has since become a standard and continues to be used in film studies classes on Hitchcock.

In 2010, Open Road Media launched the first e-book version of the book, which in 2013 was re-published in a motion picture tie-in edition in the U.S.. The book was re-published in early 2013 in England, Italy, and Japan, as well as published for the first time in Brazil, Germany, Poland, Hungary, Russia, Korea, and China. The same year, Blackstone Audio released an unabridged audiobook narrated by Paul Michael Garcia and, subsequently, by Richard Powers.

== Critical reception ==
The book received considerable praise upon its publication as well as in subsequent years for reprints.

On the publication of the hardcover first edition in 1990, critic Richard Schickel called the book "indispensable and marvelously readable" and "one of the best accounts of the making of an individual movie we've ever had". Christopher Lehmann-Haupt of The New York Times declared it a "meticulous history of a single film production". Anthony Quinn in The Sunday Times wrote that "[the book] combines a gossipy retrospective with a serious work of criticism, presenting an articulate guide to Hitchcock's idiosyncratic approach to film-making and the collaborative efforts that underpinned it. The author has conducted interviews with all those involved in the making of Psycho – its casting, scripting, art design, lighting, editing, selling – in the course of it, we inch closer to the bizarre, unpredictable quality of its director".

The critic for Newsweek called the book "wonderful" and observed, "Stephen Rebello makes reading about Psycho almost as much fun as watching it". Psycho star Anthony Perkins called the book a "meticulously researched and irresistible ... Required reading not only for Psycho-philes, but for anyone interested in the backstage world of movie-creation". Images Journal reviewer Gary Johnson called it "one of the best books ever written about the making of a movie". Gerald Kaufman of The Sunday Telegraph found it "joyously entertaining".

Entertainment Weekly, referring to Rebello's revealing how Hitchcock arrived at the sound of the knife stabbing the heroine in the shower, opined "the melon tale alone is worth the price of [the book]". Another top critic wrote that, unlike other books about films and filmmakers, it "reads more like a gripping novel than detached intellectualism".

In a January 6, 2010 Newsweek story called "The Mother of All Horror Films", Malcolm Jones called the book "fascinating". Robert Graysmith, true crime author of the non-fiction book Zodiac described the book as "groundbreaking ... the most faithful, comprehensive and first book on the filming of Hitchcock’s masterpiece, the bedrock upon which all Psycho mansions are erected".

Leonard Maltin, in his "Movie Crazy" blog entry of October 29, 2010, called the book a "landmark". In 2012, a writer for The Hollywood Reporter declared the book "a masterpiece about a masterpiece". The Guardian critic John Patterson called the book "enthralling" and, on February 1, 2013, in The Guardian described the book as "revelatory". David Pitt of Booklist wrote: "There are a handful of Hitchcock biographies—Donald Spoto's The Dark Side of Genius and Patrick McGilligan's Alfred Hitchcock, among them—but here, though focusing on a single film, Rebello offers a close-up look at the director that is perhaps more revelatory about the man's character and working style than any full-length biography. A wonderful, absolutely essential book".

== Table of contents ==
- Foreword
- The Awful Truth
- The Trouble with Alfred
- The Novel
- The Director
- The Deal
- The Screenplays
- Pre-production
- Shooting
- Post-production
- Publicity
- The Release
- Afterglow and Aftermath
- Cast and Credits
- The Films of Alfred Hitchcock
- A Note on Sources
- Selected Bibliography
- Index

== Film adaptation ==
A film adaptation based on the book was made. The film is directed by Sacha Gervasi and stars Anthony Hopkins as director Alfred Hitchcock, Helen Mirren as his wife Alma Reville, Scarlett Johansson as Janet Leigh, Jessica Biel as Vera Miles and James D'Arcy as Anthony Perkins. Produced by The Montecito Picture Company and distributed by Fox Searchlight Pictures, the film was released in 17 U.S. cities on November 23, 2012.
