= Stephen Rebello =

American author and screenwriter

- Born: Stephen Rebello; Fall River, Massachusetts, United States
- Occupation: Author
- Known for: Alfred Hitchcock and the Making of Psycho

Stephen Rebello is an American writer, screenwriter, journalist and former clinical therapist.

== Early life ==
Born to parents of second-generation Portuguese American and French-Portuguese American extraction in Fall River, Massachusetts, Rebello was raised in Somerset, Massachusetts. He graduated from Somerset High School.

He graduated with a B.A. from the University of Massachusetts Dartmouth, where he double majored in literature and psychology. He received a master's degree from Simmons College School of Social Work in Boston, specialized in private therapy and counseling in a Boston, Massachusetts hospital affiliated with Harvard University, and began doctoral work at Harvard University.

== Writing career ==
After several years as a clinical social worker and supervisor at a Harvard University-affiliated hospital and also as a private therapist in Boston, he relocated in 1980 to Los Angeles. Continuing his work as a therapist there for several years, he eventually branched into journalism, publishing feature articles and interviews in The Real Paper, Cinefantastique, American Film Magazine, the Los Angeles Times, Saturday Review, Cosmopolitan, Movieline, GQ and More.

His interview subjects have included David Fincher, James Cameron, Alfred Hitchcock, Chuck Yeager, Steven Soderbergh, Matt Damon, Jerry Bruckheimer, Tom Cruise, Robert Downey, Jr., Sigourney Weaver, Nicole Kidman, Scarlett Johansson, Sandra Bullock, Joaquin Phoenix, Michelle Pfeiffer, Heath Ledger, Kate Winslet, Drew Barrymore, Keanu Reeves, Matthew McConaughey, and Denzel Washington. For nearly two decades, he was a Playboy magazine contributor, writing interviews and features. He also wrote their magazine and online film criticism and served as a Contributing Editor.

He won Los Angeles Press Awards for magazine features documenting the making of Goodfellas and the rise and fall of the "redneck cinema" that includes Smokey and the Bandit.

=== Reel Art (1988) ===
On May 30, 1988, Abbeville Press published his non-fiction book Reel Art: Great Posters From the Golden Age of the Silver Screen (with Richard C. Allen). The book generated film poster exhibitions in 1988 at the Museum of the Moving Image in Astoria, Queens, New York and in 1990 in the Paine Webber Building in New York City.

=== Alfred Hitchcock and the Making of Psycho (1990) ===
Rebello's 1990 non-fiction book Alfred Hitchcock and the Making of Psycho was distributed by W. W. Norton. Christopher Lehmann-Haupt in the May 7, 1990, edition of The New York Times declared it a "meticulous history of a single film production." Critic, author and filmmaker Richard Schickel called the book "indispensable and marvelously readable" and "one of the best accounts of the making of an individual movie we've ever had." Reviewer Gary Johnson called the book "one of the best books ever written about the making of a movie" and "unquestionably the best source available." Critic Leonard Maltin on his blog called the book a "landmark."

Paperback editions have been published by St. Martin's Griffin and by W. W. Norton. Hardcover editions have been published in the U.K., Germany, Australia, Italy, Portugal, China, Russia, Korea, and Japan. The 2012 film Hitchcock starring Anthony Hopkins, Helen Mirren, and Scarlett Johansson was adapted from the book.

=== Hitchcock (2012) ===
In January 2010, Paramount Pictures purchased the screen rights to the book. The film began development in 2011 by The Montecito Picture Company with first-time director Sacha Gervasi at the helm of the project subsequently entitled Hitchcock. Early screenplay drafts were written by Black Swan co-writer John J. McLaughlin; Rebello wrote several subsequent revised drafts. By late 2011, Fox Searchlight Pictures bought the project and the film was cast with Anthony Hopkins, Helen Mirren, Scarlett Johansson, James D'Arcy, Jessica Biel, Toni Collette, Danny Huston, Michael Stuhlbarg, Ralph Macchio, Michael Wincott, Richard Portnow and Kurtwood Smith. Principal photography began on location on April 13, 2012, and the film was released in selected U.S. cities on November 23, 2012, with a nationwide and worldwide theatrical expansion thereafter. It underperformed at the box office with a modest take of $27,039,669. Hitchcock was chosen as the opening night film of the 2012 American Film Institute's annual film festival.

=== Dolls! Dolls! Dolls! (2020) ===
Penguin Books published Rebello's non-fiction book, Dolls! Dolls! Dolls!, on June 2 and a second printing was ordered less than a month later. The book, which details the history of Jacqueline Susann writing her bestselling novel and Hollywood's movie adaptation of that novel, received considerable media attention and critical praise. The editors of Vogue chose it as one of best books of the summer, praising its "great detail and heavy research" and calling it "as heady and colorful as the pulsating Pucci prints Susann so famously wore." Kirkus Reviews thought the book was "written with a cinematic excitement," "meticulously detailed," and "a blissful treasure trove of gossipy insider details that Dolls fans will swiftly devour." Publishers Weekly called it "exuberant" and "loving." Library Journal wrote "Rebello packs tons of information into this loving look at a cultural and cult phenomenon ... Go ahead: indulge yourself. Fans will love! love! love! and newcomers will enjoy the Hollywood insider aspect." The Washington Post called it "full of surprises and even suspense" and The Hollywood Reporter placed it on its list of 20 books of the summer. The Canberra Times book critic called it, "Hilarious and informative...Stephen Rebello has written two of my favorite books about movies. And now he's written a third ... a must-read for fans of Susann, fans of movies and fans of pop culture." Theater Jones called it "fascinating," "enlightening" and "entertaining," and "required reading for all Valley of the Dolls fans, of course, but also highly recommended as a postmortem view of the birth of a blockbuster, circa the 1960s."

=== "A City Full of Hawks: On the Waterfront Seventy Years Later - Still the Great American Contender" (2024) ===
Published in November of 2024, the book received such positive reviews as this one in Publishers Weekly, "Journalist Rebello delivers a meticulous account of On the Waterfront ’s bumpy path to the silver screen.... Rebello gamely traces how real-life political drama combined with rank Hollywood gamesmanship to create a classic of American film. Cinephiles will be transfixed."

Wrote Steven C. Smith: "Compelling from start to finish, A City Full of Hawks is a page-turner, thanks to vivid storytelling, an energetic pace, and surprising details about the conflict and creativity behind an American classic. Rebello impressively conveys how difficult it is to make a good film, much less a great one. He also debunks the myth of the director-as-sole-creator, as he explores the contributions of writer Budd Schulberg, cinematographer Boris Kaufman, composer Leonard Bernstein, and notorious producer Sam Spiegel, whose devious financial dealings were balanced by excellent taste. The result is a definitive book on its subject - one that gives director Elia Kazan the praise he deserves as a filmmaker, while reminding us of his flawed morality during the Hollywood blacklist."

Nat Segaloff opined: On the Waterfront remains a powerhouse film that has been endlessly quoted but never before so meticulously examined as by Stephen Rebello in his painstaking chronicle, A City Full of Hawks... As brilliantly as Rebello captured Hitchcock's Psycho in his Alfred Hitchcock and the Making of Psycho, he wrestles On the Waterfront into history."

== Bibliography ==
- Reel Art - Great Posters From the Golden Age of the Silver Screen (with Richard C. Allen) (1988), Abbeville Press.
- Alfred Hitchcock and the Making of Psycho (1990), Dembner Books
- Bad Movies We Love (with Edward Margulies) (1993), Plume
- The Art of Pocahontas (1995), Hyperion
- The Art of the Hunchback of Notre Dame (1996), Hyperion
- The Art of Hercules: The Chaos of Creation (1997), Hyperion
- Dolls! Dolls! Dolls!: Deep Inside Valley of the Dolls, the Most Beloved Bad Book and Movie of All Time (2020) Penguin Books
- The Art of Wish (2023), Chronicle Books
- "A City Full of Hawks" On the Waterfront Seventy Years Later - Still the Great American Contender (2024) Applause Books
- Criss-Cross - The Making of Hitchcock's Dazzling, Subversive Masterpiece Strangers on a Train (2025) Running Press.

== See also ==
- Psycho (1960 Hitchcock film)
