= Valley of the Dolls (miniseries) =

American television drama miniseries

- Written by: Laurence Heath
- Story by: Jacqueline Susann
- Directed by: Walter Grauman
- Starring: Catherine Hicks; Lisa Hartman; Veronica Hamel
- Music by: Fred Karlin
- Country of origin: United States
- Original language: English

Production
- Producer: Renee Valente
- Cinematography: Robert L. Morrison
- Editor: Sidney Katz
- Running time: 3h 53min
- Production company: 20th Century Fox Television

Original release
- Network: CBS
- Release: October 19 – October 20, 1981

Jacqueline Susann's Valley of the Dolls is an American television drama miniseries that aired on CBS in October 1981. The first two hours were broadcast on October 19, followed by three hours on October 20 during prime time; CBS originally intended it to last a total of four hours, but requests by the filmmakers for an further hour were granted in September. The teleplay is adapted from the 1966 novel Valley of the Dolls by Jacqueline Susann. The miniseries was directed by Walter Grauman, with Susann's husband Irving Mansfield as executive producer.

== Plot ==
Ann Wells (Catherine Hicks) is an ambitious young lawyer working for a Hollywood entertainment conglomerate owned by mogul Henry Bellamy (James Coburn). She befriends club singer Neely O’Hara (Lisa Hartman), who is said to have had a traumatic youth, and starlet Jennifer North (Veronica Hamel), who is rumored to have worked in pornographic movies. Ann meets director Lyon Burke (David Birney) through her work and they begin a love affair. Burke is directing a movie musical called Fanfare, produced by Bellamy's company, starring legendary star Helen Lawson (Jean Simmons), who is a former lover of both Henry and Lyon. Jennifer has a small role in Fanfare and Helen is jealous of her youth.

Ann suggests Neely for a key part in Fanfare. Neely is talented but overcome by nerves. The movie's hairdresser, Teddi Casablanca (Steve Inwood), gives her pills to steady her nerves. Neely's performance is a success and she becomes a major singing and acting star, but develops a drug and alcohol addiction.

Jennifer falls in love with her co-star, singer/actor Tony Polar (Bert Convy). She becomes pregnant and the couple plans to marry. Tony's protective sister Miriam (Carol Lawrence) tells Jennifer that Tony has a congenital degenerative disease that will inevitably lead to his cognitive decline and early death, and she compels Jennifer to have an abortion. Tony – who does not know about his illness, and the risk to his unborn child – cannot forgive Jennifer for the abortion and ends the relationship. Jennifer flees to Paris and becomes addicted to drugs and alcohol. She later becomes an artist's model and has a lesbian relationship with painter Vivienne (Camilla Sparv), who helps Jennifer overcome her problems.

In the second episode, Neely wins a prestigious movie award and forgets to thank Helen Lawson in her acceptance speech. The two women argue backstage at the awards ceremony and Neely pulls off Helen's wig, spitefully flushing it down the toilet just before Helen is due on stage to accept a lifetime achievement award. Helen goes onstage anyway, exposing her natural gray hair, which earns her the respect of the industry. She decides to accept her age and move into supporting character roles.

After a brief affair with Lyon, who is in Paris working on a new movie, Jennifer returns to Hollywood and becomes a top model and spokesperson for a cosmetics company. She falls in love with the company's founder, Kevin Gilmore (Gary Collins), but soon discovers that she has advanced cancer. Aware that Kevin's first wife died of cancer, and wanting to spare him further suffering, she takes an intentional overdose of sedatives and dies the night before she is scheduled to have surgery.

Neely's career skyrockets but her substance abuse continues. Teddi becomes controlling, taking over the management of her career and dictating her looks. After an argument with Teddi, Neely goes on a bender and attempts suicide; Lyon and Ann talk her down from a rooftop. Following a stint in rehab, she signs with new managers and throws Teddi out of her life. Unfortunately, she soon drifts back into using alcohol and drugs to manage her weight and stress. Neely breaks down on stage while performing a tribute to Jennifer. Suffering an amphetamine psychosis, Neely hallucinates that people are trying to harm her and is admitted to a sanatorium, where she meets Tony who has now succumbed to dementia.

Lyon and Ann drift apart and she has a brief affair with her boss Henry, who is grooming her to be a “baby mogul” and take on increasing power in his company. Ann and Lyon later reconcile and work together on a new movie, starring the now-recovered Neely. Ann discovers that Lyon and Neely are having an affair. She tells Neely that they will always be friends, but ends her relationship with Lyon for good.

== Cast ==
Starring

- Catherine Hicks as Ann Wells
- Lisa Hartman as Neely O'Hara
- Veronica Hamel as Jennifer North
- David Birney as Lyon Burke

Also starring

- Gary Collins as Kevin Gilmore
- Bert Convy as Tony Polar
- Britt Ekland as Francoise
- Denise Nicholas Hill as Connie
- Steve Inwood as Teddi Casablanca
- Carol Lawrence as Miriam
- Camilla Sparv as Vivienne Moray

Special guest stars

- Jean Simmons as Helen Lawson
- James Coburn as Henry Bellamy

== Reception ==
The Washington Post's Tom Shales reviewed the miniseries and called it a "leaden and laborious remake" and found the 1967 film to be superior.
