= Frank Runyeon =

American actor (born 1953)

- Born: August 23, 1953 (age 71); Cleveland, Ohio
- Occupation: Actor
- Spouse: Annie Runyeon (1980–present)
- Children: 3

Frank Runyeon (born August 23, 1953 in Cleveland, Ohio) is an American actor, best known for playing Steve Andropoulos on the soap opera As the World Turns.

== Career ==
Frank Runyeon played Steve Andropoulos on CBS's As the World Turns from 1980 to 1987.

After leaving CBS, Runyeon starred as Michael Donnelly on NBC's soap opera Santa Barbara from 1988 to 1991. He appeared as Simon Romero on ABC's soap General Hospital in 1992, and as Ed McClain on Another World in 1994 and a short appearance as Angel on The Young and the Restless, for which he was nominated for a Daytime Emmy. He has also guest-starred on numerous prime-time television shows, including LA Law, Falcon Crest, and Melrose Place. He starred as Detective Marty Lowery in the 1985 feature film, Sudden Death.

== Personal life ==
Runyeon took a sabbatical from Hollywood in the early 1990s to go to seminary. He graduated from The Hill School in 1971. A 1975 graduate of Princeton University, he studied at Fuller Seminary and Yale Divinity School before receiving his Masters, with honors, from General Theological Seminary in 1994. He then translated and adapted six different texts from the New Testament for performance as one-man shows. He has performed in over 2,000 churches of all denominations in 47 states. Runyeon also frequently speaks about the media.

Runyeon and his wife Annie were married in 1980 and have three children.

== Filmography ==
- Sudden Death (1985) as Det. Marty Lowery
