= Valley of the Dolls (TV series) =

- Based on: Valley of the Dolls by Jacqueline Susann
- Developed by: Bill LaMond; Jo LaMond
- Starring: Sally Kirkland; Melissa De Sousa; Sharon Case; Michael Paul Chan
- Composers: Inon Zur; David Ari Leon
- Country of origin: United States
- Original language: English
- No. of seasons: 1
- No. of episodes: 65

Production
- Running time: 30 minutes
- Production companies: Take A Meeting Productions; New World Entertainment

Original release
- Network: Syndication
- Release: June 13 – September 9, 1994

Valley of the Dolls is an American drama series that aired in syndication that ran from June 13 until September 9, 1994, and ran for 65 half-hour episodes.

== Overview ==
A 1990s television adaption of the 1966 novel Valley of the Dolls shows the lives of various glamorous women living in Southern California.

== Principal cast ==
- Sally Kirkland as Helen Lawson
- Colleen Morris as Jennifer North
- Melissa De Sousa as Neely O'Hara
- Sharon Case as Anne Welles
- Warren Burton as Mitch Henry
- Michael Paul Chan as Rick Chen
- Kamar de los Reyes as Ray Ariaz
- Cameron Hall as Billy Shreiber
- Lisa Howard as Caitlin North
- Carol Lawrence as Bernice Stein
- Scott Marlowe as Michael Burke
- John O'Hurley as Allen Cooper
- Jim Pirri as Jean-Claude
- Tom Reilly as Peter D'Allesio
- Mik Scriba as Gordon North
- Milton Selzer as Manny Henry
- Kevin Spirtas as Tim Burke
- David Stratton as Dennis Ulander
