= David Weisbart =

American film editor and producer (1915–1967)

David Weisbert
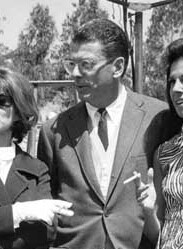
- Weisbart in 1967
- Born: January 21, 1915; Los Angeles, California, U.S.
- Died: July 21, 1967 (aged 52); Los Angeles, California, U.S.
- Occupations: Film editor and producer

David M. Weisbart (January 21, 1915 – July 21, 1967) was an American film editor and producer.

== Early life ==
Weisbart was born in Los Angeles. He graduated in 1932 from Fairfax High School in Los Angeles and was President of his graduating class.

== Career ==
Weisbart began working as a film editor for Warner Bros. in 1942. Over the next decade, he was involved in the editing of some twenty films, including The Constant Nymph (1943), Mildred Pierce (1945), Night and Day (1946), Dark Passage (1947), The Fountainhead (1949), The Glass Menagerie (1950), and A Streetcar Named Desire (1951). He was nominated for the Academy Award for editing Johnny Belinda (1948).

=== Producer ===
In 1952, Weisbart became a producer, the youngest under contract to Warner Bros. That same year he produced his first film, Mara Maru, starring Errol Flynn and Ruth Roman. In 1955 he produced the film for which he is probably best remembered: the James Dean classic, Rebel Without a Cause.

Weisbart left Warner Bros. for 20th Century Fox, where he produced Love Me Tender (1956), the first Elvis Presley film. Weisbart would produce three more Presley movies, as well as April Love (1957) for another teen idol, Pat Boone.

With Samuel A. Peeples, Weisbart created the television series Custer, also known as The Legend of Custer, which ran on ABC for seventeen episodes in 1967.

On July 21, 1967, Weisbart died of what was apparently heart failure; he collapsed while playing golf with film director Mark Robson on a Los Angeles golf course. He was 52, and was survived by his wife and two daughters.

=== Death ===
At the time of his death, Weisbart was producing the high-profile Valley of the Dolls, based on the novel by Jacqueline Susann. He died while on the golf course with director Mark Robson.

The film was released in December 1967. Although it received scathing reviews, it was 20th Century Fox's biggest box office hit of the year. At the time of his death, Weisbart was preparing a film version of Irwin Wallace's The Plot.

Journalist Bob Freund called him "one of the finest gentlemen in the industry." Norma Lee Browning called him "one of the unsung heroes of movie making."

== Select filmography ==
=== Editor ===
- You Can't Escape Forever (1942)
- Edge of Darkness (1943)
- The Constant Nymph (1943)
- Roughly Speaking (1945)
- Conflict (1945)
- Mildred Pierce (1945)
- My Reputation (1946)
- One More Tomorrow (1946)
- Night and Day (1946)
- Stallion Road (1947)
- Dark Passage (1947)
- That Hagen Girl (1947)
- Johnny Belinda (1948)
- A Kiss in the Dark (1949)
- The Fountainhead (1949)
- The Lady Takes a Sailor (1949)
- Perfect Strangers (1950)
- The Glass Menagerie (1950)
- The Man Who Cheated Himself (1950)
- A Streetcar Named Desire (1951)

=== Producer ===
==== Warner Bros ====
- Mara Maru (1952)
- Carson City (1952)
- The Charge at Feather River (1953)
- Thunder Over the Plains (1953)
- The Command (1954)
- The Boy from Oklahoma (1954)
- Them! (1954)
- Jump Into Hell (1955)
- Tall Man Riding (1955)
- Rebel Without a Cause (1955)
- Target Zero (1955)
- Our Miss Brooks (1956)
- The Steel Jungle (1956)

==== 20th Century-Fox ====
- Between Heaven and Hell (1956)
- Love Me Tender (1956)
- The Way to the Gold (1957)
- April Love (1957)
- These Thousand Hills (1959)
- Holiday for Lovers (1959)
- A Private's Affair (1959)
- Flaming Star (1960)
- Kid Galahad (1962)
- Rio Conchos (1964)
- Goodbye Charlie (1964)
- The Pleasure Seekers (1964)
- The Legend of Jesse James (1965-66) (TV series)
- Valley of the Dolls (1967)
- Custer (1967) (TV series)
- The Legend of Custer (1968)

===== United Artists =====
- Follow That Dream (1962)
- Kid Galahad (1962)
