= Veronica Hamel =

American actress (born 1943)

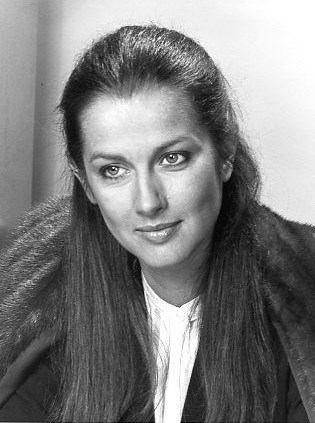
- Hamel as Joyce Davenport on Hill Street Blues (1981–1987)
- Born: November 20, 1943 (age 82); Philadelphia, Pennsylvania, U.S.
- Occupations: Actress, model
- Years active: 1971–2010
- Spouse: Michael Irving (m. 1971; div. 1981)

Veronica Hamel (born November 20, 1943) is an American actress and model. She was nominated five times for an Emmy Award for her role as attorney Joyce Davenport in the TV police drama Hill Street Blues.

== Biography ==
The daughter of a Philadelphia carpenter and a housewife, Hamel graduated from Temple University. She worked as a secretary for a company that manufactured ironing board covers. She began a fashion modeling career after being discovered by Eileen Ford. In her first film role, she played a model in 1971's Klute, followed by roles in the disaster films Beyond the Poseidon Adventure and When Time Ran Out.

She was the model in the final cigarette commercial televised in the U.S. (for Virginia Slims, aired at 11:59 pm on January 1, 1971, on The Tonight Show). Such advertisements had been banned after passage of the Public Health Cigarette Smoking Act. Hamel had also been a model in print advertisements for tobacco products including Virginia Slims and Pall Mall Gold.

Hamel started appearing in TV series in 1975. She was considered for the role of Kelly Garrett on Charlie's Angels, but reportedly declined the role. Producer Aaron Spelling cast Jaclyn Smith, instead. Hamel is best remembered for playing Joyce Davenport, the dedicated public defender, who also happened to be the love interest of police captain Frank Furillo, on the long-running TV series Hill Street Blues from 1981 to 1987. She was a five-time Emmy nominee for that role.

Hamel was cast in a leading role in Alan Alda's 1988 film A New Life as his doctor and love interest. She played Elizabeth, the wife of Charles Grodin's character in the movie Taking Care of Business in 1990. She was named on Us magazine's "Best Dressed" list for 1983.

In 2002, she also appeared on Hill Street Blues creator Steven Bochco's legal drama Philly. In the late 2000s, Hamel had a recurring role in the NBC television series Third Watch and appeared as Margo Shephard, Jack's mother, in the ABC series Lost.

== Filmography ==
=== Film ===
Year	Title	Role	Notes
1971	Klute	Model	Uncredited
1976	Cannonball	Linda Maxwell	
1976	Apple Pie	Artist	
1979	Beyond the Poseidon Adventure	Suzanne Constantine	
1980	When Time Ran Out	Nikki Spangler	
1988	A New Life	Kay Hutton	
1990	Taking Care of Business	Elizabeth Barnes	
1998	The Last Leprechaun	Laura Duvann	
2002	Determination of Death	Virginia 'Ginny' Halloran	

=== Television ===
Year	Title	Role	Notes
1975	Kojak	Elenora	"How Cruel the Frost, How Bright the Stars"
1976	The Bob Newhart Show	Rosemary	"Peeper Two"
1976	Switch	Nabilla	"Round Up the Usual Suspects"
1976	Starsky & Hutch	Marianne Tustin	"Tap Dancing Her Way Right Back into Your Hearts"
1976	The Rockford Files	Sandy Lederer / Marcy Brownell	"A Bad Deal in the Valley", "Return to the 38th Parallel"
1977	Family	Vicki Webber	"Change of Heart"
1977	79 Park Avenue	Laura Koshko	TV miniseries
1977	The Gathering	Helen	TV film
1978	Starsky & Hutch	Vanessa	"Hutchinson for Murder One"
1978	Ski Lift to Death	Andrea Mason	TV film
1978	The Eddie Capra Mysteries	Janet Wilde	"The Intimate Friends of Janet Wilde"
1979	Dallas	Leanne Rees	"Call Girl"
1979	The Gathering, Part II	Helen	TV film
1980	Eischied	Shannon Marshall	"Powder Burn"
1980	The Hustler of Muscle Beach	Sheila Dodge	TV film
1981	Jacqueline Susann's Valley of the Dolls	Jennifer North	TV film
1981–1987	Hill Street Blues	Joyce Davenport	Main role
1983	Sessions	Lee / Randy Churchill	TV film
1985	Kane & Abel	Kate Kane	TV miniseries
1989	Twist of Fate	Deborah	"Part II"
1990	She Said No	Elizabeth 'Beth' Early	TV film
1991	Stop at Nothing	Nettie Forbes	TV film
1991	Deadly Medicine	Kathleen Holland	TV film
1992	Baby Snatcher	Bianca Hudson	TV film
1993	The Disappearance of Nora	Nora Freemont	TV film
1993	The Conviction of Kitty Dodds	Kitty Dodds	TV film
1994	Stalker: Shadow of Obsession	Rebecca Kendall	TV film
1994	A Child's Cry for Help	Dr. Paula Spencer	TV film
1995	Secrets	Etta Berter	TV film
1995	Here Come the Munsters	Lily Munster	TV film
1996	In the Blink of an Eye	Micki Dickoff	TV film
1996	Talk to Me	Sadie	TV film
1997	Home Invasion	Georgia Patchett	TV film
1997	Stranger in My Home	Jennifer	TV film
1998	Touched by an Angel	Judge Dolores Chaphin	"The Wind Beneath My Wings"
2001	The Division	Myrna Roberts	"Mother's Day"
2001	The Fugitive	Dr. Diana Thayer	"Flesh and Blood"
2001–02	Philly	Judge Marjorie Brennan	Recurring role
2002–03	Third Watch	Beth Taylor	"Two Hundred and Thirty-Three Days", "The Price of Nobility", "My Opening Farewell"
2004–2010	Lost	Margo Shephard	"White Rabbit", "There's No Place Like Home: Part 1", "Lighthouse"
2008	Bone Eater	Commissioner Hayes	TV film
