= Yargo (novel) =

1979 novel by Jacqueline Susann

- First edition cover (p/b)
- Author: Jacqueline Susann
- Genre: Science fiction, Romance
- Publisher: Bantam Books
- Publication date: February 28, 1979
- Pages: 347
- ISBN: 0553128558

Yargo is a romantic science fiction novel by Jacqueline Susann. It was written during the 1950s, but not published until 1979, four years after Susann's death.

== Plot summary ==
Yargo tells the story of Janet Cooper, a young woman from Avalon, New Jersey, who is abducted by aliens from the planet Yargo. During her interplanetary adventures with these intelligent but emotionless extraterrestrials, she falls in love with their leader.

== Background ==
Jacqueline Susann had long been interested in science fiction; her widower, Irving Mansfield, said that when they first met, she wanted to spend their dates at the Hayden Planetarium instead of at nightclubs. In the early 1950s, she began to write Yargo, originally called The Stars Scream. She finished the book in 1956, and gave it to MCA agent George Chasin, who attempted to sell the story to Hollywood. Unsuccessful, he put the manuscript aside, where it was forgotten until Chasin reportedly was cleaning out a filing cabinet after Susann's death. Irving Mansfield suggested Chasin send it to Bantam Books, Susann's long-time paperback publisher; Bantam accepted it for publication, with a first printing of 1.3 million copies. The story also appeared in the February 1979 issue of the Ladies' Home Journal, which had enjoyed a huge success five years earlier when it published Susann's original novella, Dolores. Yargo was published on February 28, 1979.

== Reception ==
Critical notices were negative: one critic wrote, "It's awful, as usual, and it will sell, as usual." The Science Fiction & Fantasy Book Review stated that Yargo is "mildly entertaining," but "has no lasting value... except perhaps as a curiosity." Yargo was, nonetheless, a best seller, spending seven weeks on the New York Times Mass Market Paperback list. The blog The Sleaze Factor, that celebrates trashy books, movies and pop culture, found Yargo "Very delightful indeed." He continues, "Contrary to what some may believe, Yargo is surprisingly effective. Of course you have to dig Jacqueline Susann to really get this one. We’re not talking about [fantasy and science fiction author] Alan Dean Foster here. Yargo is just a quick and satisfying—and yes, silly—read that will make anyone on the Susann band wagon smile and appreciate her range as a trashy novelist."
