= Isn't She Great =

2000 comedy drama film by Andrew Bergman

- Theatrical release poster
- Directed by: Andrew Bergman
- Written by: Paul Rudnick
- Based on: "Wasn't She Great?" by Michael Korda
- Produced by: Mike Lobell
- Starring: Bette Midler; Nathan Lane; Stockard Channing; David Hyde Pierce; Amanda Peet; John Cleese
- Cinematography: Karl Walter Lindenlaub
- Edited by: Barry Malkin
- Music by: Burt Bacharach
- Production companies: BBC; Lobell-Bergman Productions; Marubeni; Mutual Film Company; Tele-München; Toho-Towa
- Distributed by: Universal Pictures (North America, United Kingdom and Ireland); Concorde Filmverleih (Germany); Toho-Towa (Japan)
- Release date: January 28, 2000
- Running time: 95 minutes
- Countries: United States; United Kingdom; Germany; Japan
- Language: English
- Budget: $36 million
- Box office: $3 million

Isn't She Great is a 2000 biographical comedy-drama film that presents a fictionalized biography of author Jacqueline Susann, played by Bette Midler. An international co-production between the United States, the United Kingdom, Germany, and Japan, the film was directed by Andrew Bergman from a screenplay by Paul Rudnick based on a 1995 New Yorker profile by Michael Korda.

In addition to Midler and Lane, the film stars Stockard Channing as Susann's "gal pal" Florence Maybelle, David Hyde Pierce as book editor Michael Hastings, and John Cleese as publisher Henry Marcus. John Larroquette, Amanda Peet, Christopher McDonald, Debbie Shapiro, and Paul Benedict have supporting roles. Opening in 750 US theaters on January 28, 2000, it received negative reviews from critics and earned only $3 million at the box office, far less than its cost of $36 million. Midler was nominated for a Golden Raspberry Award for Worst Actress.

== Plot ==
The film covers Susann's entire life, focusing on her early struggles as an aspiring actress relentlessly hungry for fame, her relationship with press agent husband Irving Mansfield (Nathan Lane), with whom she had an institutionalized autistic son, her success as the author of Valley of the Dolls, and her battle with and subsequent death from breast cancer.

== Cast ==
- Bette Midler as Jacqueline Susann
- Nathan Lane as Irving Mansfield
- Stockard Channing as Florence Maybelle
- David Hyde Pierce as Michael Hastings
- John Cleese as Henry Marcus
- Amanda Peet as Debbie Klausman
- John Larroquette as Maury Manning
- Christopher McDonald as Brad Bradburn
- Dina Spybey as Bambi Madison
- Larry Block as Herbie
- Paul Benedict as Brainiac
- Frank Vincent as Aristotle Onassis
- James Villemaire as Jim Morrison
- Sam Street as Truman Capote

== Production ==
The film was an international production, with the BBC, Lobell-Bergman Productions, Marbeni, Mutual Film Corporation, Tele München, Toho and Universal Pictures contributing, making it an American-British-German-Japanese co-production.Despite the international production, the film was not released in Japan.

== Reception ==
Isn't She Great was not well received by critics and the film holds a 25% rating on Rotten Tomatoes based on 61 reviews. The site's consensus states, "Bland material produces entirely forgettable comic performances." Metacritic, which uses a weighted average, assigned the film a score of 34 out of 100, based on 34 critics, indicating "generally unfavorable" reviews.

Elvis Mitchell of The New York Times praised Midler, Lane, and Cleese, but opined that screenwriter "Rudnick and the director Andrew Bergman (The In-Laws, 'Honeymoon in Vegas') have so defanged 'Isn't She Great' that it's like watching a sketch from the old 'Carol Burnett Show' that has mildewed." In contrast, Stephanie Zacharek of Salon gave a positive review. She admitted the film plays "fast and loose with facts," but described it as "a cupcake of a movie, a sweet and lightweight little thing that's all but served up in a ruffled paper cup." She praised the cast, particularly Lane, writing "what makes him so remarkable is that, even within the broadness of his role and the overarching, at times almost overwhelming, broadness of the picture itself, he manages an astonishing emotional delicacy."

Peter Stack of the San Francisco Chronicle said, "As a showbiz story, 'Isn't She Great' tends to work OK, even if there's no display (fortunately) of the subject's talents. The showbiz feel is the film's main aim, inferred by the casting of klieg-light legends Midler and Lane, and by delineating Susann as a wannabe who succeeded in gaining the world fame of an entertainer." He concluded the film works better as "an amusing look at self-invention and bravado." In a one-star review for the Chicago Sun-Times, Roger Ebert said, "I was hoping for satire, but they've made a flat and peculiar film that in its visual look and dramatic style might be described as the final movie of the 1950s."

== Soundtrack ==
Polygram Records released a soundtrack album containing "On My Way" and "The Book Tour (On My Way – Reprised)" by Dionne Warwick, "Open Your Heart" by Vanessa Williams and 14 instrumentals by Burt Bacharach.

== Accolades ==
=== Nominations ===
- Razzie Awards: Worst Actress (Bette Midler)

== Bibliography ==
- Galbraith IV, Stuart (1994). Japanese Science Fiction, Fantasy and Horror Films. McFarland. ISBN 0899508537.
- Galbraith IV, Stuart (2008). The Toho Studios Story: A History and Complete Filmography. Scarecrow Press. ISBN 9781461673743.
