= Jacqueline Susann =

American novelist and actress (1918–1974)

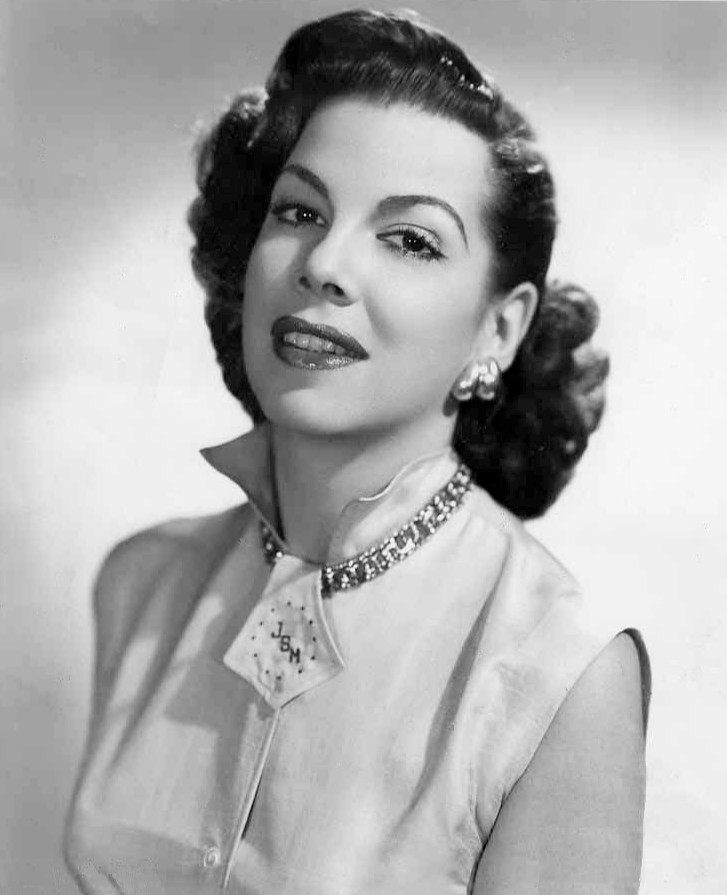
- Susann in 1951
- Born: Jacqueline Susan; August 20, 1918; Wynnewood, Pennsylvania U.S.
- Died: September 21, 1974 (aged 56); New York City, U.S.
- Occupations: Novelist; actress
- Spouse: Irving Mansfield (m. 1939)
- Children: 1
- Writing career
- Years active: 1937–1974

Jacqueline Susann (August 20, 1918 – September 21, 1974) was an American novelist and actress. Her novel Valley of the Dolls (1966) is one of the best-selling books in publishing history. With her two subsequent works, The Love Machine (1969) and Once Is Not Enough (1973), Susann became the first author to have three novels top The New York Times Best Seller list consecutively.

== Early years ==
Jacqueline Susan was born on August 20, 1918, at Lankenau Medical Center in Wynnewood, Pennsylvania, the only child of a Jewish couple: Robert Susan, a Wilno, Imperial Russia (now Vilnius, Lithuania)-born portrait painter, and his wife, Rose (née Jans), a public school teacher. It was Rose who added the second "n" to her husband's surname in order to make pronunciation easier for her students; Robert Susan retained the original spelling. Because his surname was never legally changed, his daughter was born Jacqueline Susan, as confirmed in the 1920 and 1930 US census, and her father's record in the U.S. Social Security Applications and Claims Index, 1936–2007. Nevertheless, she used her mother's version of the family surname.

As a child, her teachers reported that she was an inattentive but imaginative student. In the fifth grade, she scored 140 on an IQ test, the highest in her school. An only child and devoted to her father, Susann was determined to carry on the family name. She decided to be an actress, despite the advice of a teacher who said, "Jackie should be a writer. She breaks all the rules, but it works." In 1936, after graduating from West Philadelphia High School, she left for New York to pursue an acting career. Her father told her, "If you're going to be an actress, be a good actress. Be a people watcher."

== Stage career ==
In New York, on June 2, 1937, aged 18, Susann landed a small role in the Broadway company of The Women, the "caustic" comedy of manners by Clare Boothe that had opened on December 26, 1936, and would run for 657 performances. She subsequently appeared in such Broadway shows as The Girl from Wyoming (1938), My Fair Ladies (1941), Blossom Time (revival, 1943), Jackpot (1944), and in A Lady Says Yes (1945), which starred Hollywood siren Carole Landis. Only one of her shows following The Women was a hit: Banjo Eyes (1941), starring Eddie Cantor, ran for 126 performances.

Together with a friend, actress Beatrice Cole, Susann wrote a play called The Temporary Mrs. Smith, a comedy about a one-time movie actress whose former husbands interfere with her scheme to marry a man of wealth. Retitled Lovely Me, (Note: The title change came about after a very pregnant Susann, spotting her reflection in a mirror, asked, "How did this happen to lovely me?" Songwriter Arthur Siegel, taken with the remark, wrote a song for the show which he called "Lovely Me." The song, in turn, prompted the title change. (Seaman, Lovely Me, p. 187.)) the play, directed by actress Jessie Royce Landis, and starring Luba Malina and Mischa Auer, opened on Broadway at the Adelphi Theatre on December 25, 1946. Said to be an "audience-pleaser," the play nonetheless closed after just 37 performances. Four years later, Susann and Cole wrote another play, Cock of the Walk, which was to open on Broadway with Oscar-winning actor James Dunn. For reasons that remain unclear, the play was not produced.

In 1970, Susann made a brief return to the stage when she appeared in Blanche Yurka's off-Broadway revival of Jean Giraudoux's The Madwoman of Chaillot. Clive Barnes in The New York Times panned the production; of the cast, he praised only Yurka, but he did mention that "Jacqueline Susann looks a great deal prettier than the publicity stills on her book jackets might lead you to believe."

== Television career ==
From 1948 to 1950, Susann appeared on The Morey Amsterdam Show, a comedy series (telecast first on CBS, then on DuMont), in which she played Lola (later Jackie) the Cigarette Girl to Amsterdam's nightclub emcee. In 1951, she hosted Jacqueline Susann's Open Door (DuMont), the premise of which was to help people—most of whom had experienced hardships—find jobs. (Note: Billboard complimented Susann by writing, "Indicative of Miss Susann's charm is the fact that she did not permit the show to descend to a saccharine, tear-jerking level when there was ample chance to do just such a thing." (Chase, Sam. Television—Radio Reviews: Jacqueline Susann's Open Door. The Billboard, June 2, 1951. Retrieved January 9, 2017.)) She appeared in such series as Danger (CBS), Studio One (CBS), and Suspense (CBS), but found herself typecast: "I got cast as what I looked like—a glamorous divorcée who gets stabbed or strangled." In the summer of 1956, she appeared in NBC's revival of the panel show This Is Show Business, which was produced by her husband.

In addition to her acting and hosting work, Susann did commercials. In 1955, she became spokesperson for the Schiffli Lace and Embroidery Institute. Over the next six years, she wrote, produced, and starred in commercials that aired during such shows as New York's local Night Beat (DuMont's WABN), with Mike Wallace, (Note: Susann was present the night Wallace interviewed Grace Metalious, the previously unknown housewife from New Hampshire who was rocketing to fame as author of the then-scandalous novel, Peyton Place.) and then nationally on such shows as The Mike Wallace Interview (ABC) and The Ben Hecht Show (ABC). Sometimes she was joined on the air by her poodle, Josephine. Susann energetically promoted the product and made personal appearances on its behalf. (Note: Years later, after parting ways with Schiffli and now a well-known author, Susann said, "I would sooner wear a salami around my neck than a Schiffli embroidered collar." (Seaman, Lovely Me, pg. 258.)) One night in the early 1960s, as she was leaving a New York restaurant, Susann heard someone shout, "There's the Schiffli girl!" Susann, realizing that 25 years of hard work had culminated only in recognition as the "Schiffli girl," was discouraged. She later appeared in a 1971 episode of the crime drama Mannix ("The Crime That Wasn't", airdate January 29, 1971). In 1973, Susann played herself in an episode of Love, American Style.

== Books ==
=== Yargo ===
During the mid-1950s, Susann wrote a science-fiction novel called The Stars Scream (published posthumously as Yargo). In the early 1960s, she considered writing a book about show business and drug use, to be entitled The Pink Dolls.

=== Every Night, Josephine! ===
In 1962, after encouragement from showman Billy Rose, husband of Susann's friend, Joyce Mathews (1919–1999; twice married to Milton Berle), she began to adapt into book form letters she had written about her beloved poodle, Josephine.

Published by Bernard Geis Associates on November 16, 1963, Every Night, Josephine! sold 35,000 copies in hardcover, and by 1973 sold 1.7 million paperbacks. This affectionate account of Josephine's hijinks earned positive reviews (Note: J. D. Landis, who edited Once Is Not Enough and later became editor-and-chief of the William Morrow and Company publishing house, re-issued Josephine!, and said, "I loved it, I really did.... It was all the evidence I would ever need that this woman is a writer and was a writer right from the beginning of her career." (Seaman, Lovely Me, p. 361.)) and appeared briefly on Time magazine's best seller list, peaking at #8. In support of Josephine!, Susann undertook her first book tour, on which she was accompanied by the subject herself; often she and Josephine wore matching outfits. Even after publishing her novels, Susann cited Josephine! as her favorite of her own books.

=== Valley of the Dolls ===
Valley of the Dolls spans twenty years (1945–1965) in the lives of three young women: Anne Welles, the New England beauty who liberates herself from her staid small town by coming to New York, where she falls in love with the dashing Lyon Burke; Neely O'Hara, an ebullient vaudevillian who becomes a Hollywood star and self-destructs; and Jennifer North, a showgirl with little talent but a gorgeous face and figure, who becomes a friend to both. All three women fall prey to the "dolls," amphetamines and barbiturates, a euphemism Susann coined. The book was published by Bernard Geis on February 10, 1966, and "took off like a Cape Canaveral space shot." The story was said to be a roman à clef, with characters in the novel reportedly based on real-life celebrities such as Judy Garland, Dean Martin, and Ethel Merman.

Although Publishers Weekly, in an advance review, called the novel "powerful and sometimes fascinating," the book received largely negative reviews. Gloria Steinem panned the book in The New York Herald Tribune as did the reviewer in The New York Times. Time magazine called it the "Dirty Book of the Month," and said, "it might more accurately be described as a highly effective sedative, a living doll."

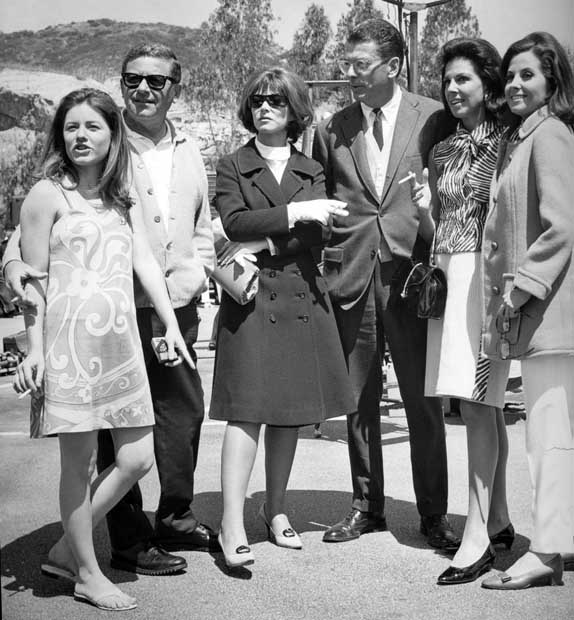
1967 film adaptation of Valley of the Dolls. Left to right: Patty Duke, Mark Robson, Lee Grant, David Weisbart, Jacqueline Susann, and Barbara Parkins.

Despite the poor reviews, the book was a commercial juggernaut. On May 8, 1966, in its ninth week on the list, the book reached #1 on The New York Times Best Seller list, where it remained for 28 consecutive weeks. With a total of 65 weeks on the list, the book became the best selling novel of 1966. By the time of Susann's death in 1974, it had entered the Guinness Book of World Records as the best selling novel in publishing history, with more than 17 million copies sold. By 2016, the book had sold more than 31 million copies.

In 1967, the book was adapted into the film of the same name, starring Barbara Parkins as Anne, Patty Duke as Neely, Sharon Tate as Jennifer, and Susan Hayward as Helen Lawson, the aging Broadway legend. Susann made a cameo appearance as a reporter at the scene of Jennifer North's suicide. Valley of the Dolls received scathing reviews, but was a widespread commercial success, becoming the sixth highest-grossing film of its year with $44.4 million at the domestic box office, a huge amount for its time. Susann herself hated the film; after its November premiere aboard the passenger liner, Princess Italia, she confronted the film's director, Mark Robson, and stated, "This picture is a piece of shit."

In 2001, author Rae Lawrence published a continuation of Valley of the Dolls, titled Jacqueline Susann's Shadow of the Dolls (Crown), which was reputedly based on notes left by Susann for an intended sequel. In its review, Publishers Weekly stated, "This tedious, tame sequel is aptly titled, as it languishes deep in the shadow of the original... Susann's original still packs a wallop; the sequel is a pulled punch."

=== The Love Machine ===
Susann's second novel, The Love Machine, is the story of Robin Stone, a ruthless but tormented executive in the cut-throat world of 1960s network television, and three women who love him: Amanda, the doomed fashion model; Maggie, the independent television personality turned movie actress; and Judith, the insecure wife of the network founder. Like Valley, the book was considered a roman à clef, with Robin reportedly based on former CBS president James Aubrey.

Published by Simon & Schuster on May 14, 1969, the book was an immediate success: it spent 32 weeks (13 weeks at #1) on The New York Times Best Seller list, and was the third highest-selling novel of its year. Reviews were not favorable; one reviewer in The New York Times compared the book to "popcorn... a kernel of an idea... exploded into bite-sized nothingness," while Time magazine complained that the book "lacks Valley's primitive vigor.

Film rights were sold to Columbia Pictures for a then-record $1.5 million. Directed by Jack Haley, Jr., the film adaptation was released in 1971, starring Dyan Cannon, Robert Ryan, and John Phillip Law. Irving Mansfield was executive producer but the film was a critical and commercial flop. Susann, who had loathed the film version of Valley, believed this adaptation was even worse.

=== Once Is Not Enough ===
Susann's third novel, Once Is Not Enough, (Note: Once Is Not Enough was originally called The Big Man, but Susann changed the title after visiting the dying comedian Joe E. Lewis. Lewis, originator of the line, "You only live once – but if you work it right, once is enough," apparently reconsidered on his deathbed, for he told Susann, "Once is not enough." (Seaman, Lovely Me, p. 414.)) was published by Morrow on March 20, 1973. Once is the story of January Wayne, daughter of a famous film and stage producer, who is hospitalized in Switzerland for three years. When she returns home to New York City, she finds that the world is far different from the one she had left. January contends with the social upheavals of the late 1960s and early 1970s in a graphic, driving story. Susann was candid about the theme of the book, stating that it was one of "mental and spiritual incest". After her death, film critic Andrew Sarris pointed out that "If there is any single key to the oeuvre of Jacqueline Susann it is to be found in an extended Electra complex."

As with her previous novels, reviews were negative (a writer for The New York Times complained of the book's "nearly 500 steadily monotonous pages"), but sales were spectacular: the book spent 36 weeks on The New York Times Best Seller list, eight of which were at #1, and became the second highest-selling novel of 1973. Susann, with this book, made publishing history as the first writer to have three consecutive number one novels on the Times list. The book was filmed in 1975 by Guy Green as Jacqueline Susann's Once Is Not Enough, with Kirk Douglas, Alexis Smith, Melina Mercouri, Brenda Vaccaro (in an Oscar-nominated performance), and Deborah Raffin. The film, executive-produced by Irving Mansfield, was not a critical favorite, but was a commercial success, grossing $15.7 million (the equivalent of $65.2 million in 2016).)

=== Posthumous works ===
Susann's final work was a novella, Dolores, a roman à clef about Jacqueline Kennedy, originally written for the February 1974 issue of the Ladies' Home Journal (which became the best-selling issue in the magazine's history). Susann's manuscript, too long for the Journal, was cut, but the excised material was restored for the book publication on July 8, 1976. Despite harsh reviews and the absence of Susann as a promotional tool, the book spent 25 weeks on The New York Times Best Seller list (seven consecutive weeks at #2), and became the third highest-selling novel of 1976.

Yargo, Susann's romantic science fiction novel written during the 1950s, was published in February 1979 as a paperback original by Bantam Books. The novel is a radical departure from the works that made her famous. During the 1970s, Susann had spoken of future works. They included a novel about brothers who have their show business start in vaudeville, to be called The Comedy Twins; a novel about a poetess, The Heroine; a continuation of the story of Neely O'Hara's sons; and her autobiography.

== Success ==
Jacqueline Susann enjoyed the fame that her books brought. "Confrontational, sassy, [and] entertaining," she appeared frequently on television, especially on talk shows. When asked what Ethel Merman thought of Valley of the Dolls, Susann responded, "We didn't speak before the book came out. Let's just say that now we're not speaking louder." Referring to Philip Roth and his best-selling novel Portnoy's Complaint, notorious for its graphic descriptions of masturbation, she said to Johnny Carson, "Philip Roth is a good writer, but I wouldn't want to shake hands with him."

Not everyone was a fan. Gore Vidal said, "She doesn't write, she types." (Note: Although Vidal surely was delighted by his own witticism, the remark is actually first attributable to Truman Capote, who in 1959 famously said of Beat writer Jack Kerouac's work, "[I]t isn't writing at all—it's typing." (Clarke, Gerald 1988). Capote: A Biography. [E-reader version] RosettaBooks, 2013.) In July 1969, Truman Capote appeared on The Tonight Show and announced that Susann looked "like a truck driver in drag." On Susann's next visit to the show, Johnny Carson gave her a chance to respond to Capote by asking, "What do you think of Truman?" Susann quipped, "I think history will prove he's one of the best presidents we've had." (Note: The feud didn't end here: Susann lambasted Capote as "a blondish pig" called Horatio Capon in her novella Dolores, and Capote continued to insult her, even after her death. (Clarke, Gerald [1988]. Capote: A Biography. [E-reader version] RosettaBooks, 2013.)

== Personal life ==
On April 2, 1939, Susann married press agent Irving Mansfield, who had impressed her by successfully placing "items" about her in the theater and society pages of New York newspapers. Despite persistent rumors of infidelity on Susann's part, she and Mansfield were devoted to each other and remained married until her death in 1974.

On December 6, 1946, Susann gave birth to their only child, a son whom they named Guy Hildy Mansfield, "Hildy" being for cabaret singer Hildegarde, who was the boy's godmother. At the age of three, Guy was diagnosed as severely autistic, and eventually had to be institutionalized; Susann and Mansfield did not reveal the true reason for his absence from home, fearing that he would be stigmatized should he eventually recover. The heartbreak from seeing their son in an institution reportedly was the impetus for her consuming pills for the rest of her life. Reportedly, Susann and Mansfield rarely missed a week visiting their son.

In 1954, the Mansfields adopted a black, half-toy half-miniature poodle, whom they named Josephine, in honor of comedian Joe E. Lewis. Josephine became the subject of Susann's first published book, and was to be the subject of a sequel, Good Night, Sweet Princess, which Josephine did not live to write. Josephine died on January 6, 1970, just days before her sixteenth birthday.

In 1962, at the age of 44, Susann was diagnosed with breast cancer, and underwent a radical mastectomy. During her recuperation, she made a pact with God: if she were given ten more years of life, she would prove herself to be the best-selling writer in the world. With her diagnosis, Susann felt an urgency to make money as quickly as possible, to ensure her son would be properly looked after for the rest of his life.

Despite reports that various celebrities, including Susann, were invited to the house of Roman Polanski and Sharon Tate on the night of August 8, 1969, there, in fact, was no one who was invited over that day other than two of Sharon's friends, who had lunch with her. This has been asserted by Sharon's husband and family.

== Death ==
After suffering from a persistent cough, Susann, who was concerned about her upcoming book tour in support of Once Is Not Enough, checked into Doctors Hospital on January 11, 1973. Test results showed a nodular lesion in her right lung; she was transferred to Mount Sinai Hospital for a bronchoscopy and biopsy. On January 18, she received a diagnosis of lung cancer, and immediately began cobalt treatments and daily chemotherapy injections. According to Irving Mansfield, there was some disagreement between doctors as to whether this was a metastatic breast cancer or an original lung cancer; accurate evaluation would determine the plan of treatment and subsequent prognosis.

Despite the grueling treatment, Susann's cancer spread, and she entered Doctors Hospital for the last time, on August 20, 1974, her 56th birthday. After days lapsing in and out of a coma, she died on September 21. (Note: Susann's age at her death was 56, but it was widely reported to be 53. According to husband Irving Mansfield, she had shaved three years from her age long before. (Mansfield and Block. Life with Jackie, p. 49)) Her last words to Mansfield were, "Hey, doll, let's get the hell out of here." She was survived by her husband, her son, and her mother.

== Influence ==
Jacqueline Susann is acknowledged to be the first "brand-name" novelist, a novelist who sells independent of critical attention. With her husband, Irving Mansfield, Susann revolutionized book promotion, and they are widely credited with creating the modern-day book tour. Michael Korda, editor of Susann's Love Machine said in 1995 that, prior to Susann, "people weren't so much interested in selling books as they were in publishing them." To what had once been considered a "gentleman's profession," she brought a show business sensibility. She toured extensively in support of each book, making appearances at bookstores and on countless television and radio shows. Her books were advertised on the entertainment pages of major newspapers, and Mansfield tested her book covers to see how they appeared on television. She even served coffee and doughnuts to the truck drivers who would be delivering her books. She lavished attention on booksellers, sending them thank you notes, and even bought copies of her book for bookstore clerks. "A new book is like a new brand of detergent," she said. "You have to let the public know about it. What's wrong with that?"

== Depictions ==
In 1998, Susann was played by actress Michele Lee in the television film Scandalous Me: The Jacqueline Susann Story (USA), based on Barbara Seaman's biography Lovely Me: The Life of Jacqueline Susann. Peter Riegert played Mansfield; also in the cast was Barbara Parkins (who played Anne in the 1967 film adaptation of Valley) as agent Annie Laurie Williams. The film was not well-reviewed, with Variety writing, "None of the storied genius that Susann exhibited in promoting herself along with her books is much in evidence. ... [it is] a movie that broadly captures all of the famed author's flaws but none of her essence."

Scandalous Me was followed in 2000 by the theatrical film Isn't She Great, based on a New Yorker profile by Michael Korda, with Bette Midler and Nathan Lane. The film was not well-received critically and was a box office bomb, with a worldwide gross of just $3 million on a $44 million budget. Film critic Roger Ebert wrote, "Jackie Susann deserved better." Midler was nominated for a Razzie award as Worst Actress for her performance.

In November 2001, Paper Doll, a play by Mark Hampton and Barbara Zitwer, premiered at the Pittsburgh Public Theater, with Marlo Thomas as Susann and F. Murray Abraham as Mansfield. Reviews were mixed, but the production was a hit with audiences. Fran Drescher was reportedly cast for the Broadway production, but that production was cancelled.

Susann was also the subject of a one-woman play by Paul Minx called See How Beautiful I Am: The Return of Jackie Susann, during which a dying Susann discusses her life and career. The show was performed as part of the Edinburgh Festival in 2001 as well as the New York International Fringe Festival in 2008.

== In popular culture ==
Susann is mentioned (along with Harold Robbins) in Star Trek IV: The Voyage Home by Admiral James T. Kirk, as archetypal 20th century writers, whom his first officer Spock recognizes as "the giants".

She is mentioned by name in the chorus of the song "Adult Books" by the band X. The song is featured on their 1981 album Wild Gift.

In the TV series Endeavour (season 6, episode 2, "Apollo"), Susann is mentioned. One of the characters says: "I had a solitary dinner and took Jacqueline Susann to bed."

== Works ==
=== Play ===
- Lovely Me (1946, with Beatrice Cole)

=== Memoir ===
- Every Night, Josephine! (Bernard Geis, 1963) ISBN 0-14-303434-0

=== Novels ===
- Valley of the Dolls (Bernard Geis, 1966) ISBN 0-8021-3519-6
- The Love Machine (Simon & Schuster, 1969) ISBN 0-8021-3544-7
- Once Is Not Enough (William Morrow, 1973) ISBN 0-8021-3545-5
- Dolores (William Morrow, 1976) ISBN 0-553-20958-2
- Yargo (Bantam, 1979) ISBN 0553128558
