= James T. Aubrey =

American media executive (1918–1994)

- Aubrey c. 1959
- Born: James Thomas Steven Aubrey; December 14, 1918; LaSalle, Illinois, U.S.
- Died: September 3, 1994 (aged 75); Los Angeles, California, U.S.
- Education: Princeton University
- Occupations: Television and film executive
- Spouse: Phyllis Thaxter (m. 1944; div. 1962)
- Children: 2

James Thomas Aubrey Jr. (December 14, 1918 – September 3, 1994) was an American television and film executive. As president of the CBS television network from 1959 to 1965, he produced some of television's most enduring series on the air, including Gilligan's Island and The Beverly Hillbillies.

Under Aubrey's leadership, CBS dominated American television, leading the other networks NBC and ABC, by nine points and seeing its profits rise from $25 million in 1959 to $49 million in 1964. The New York Times Magazine in 1964 called Aubrey "a master of programming whose divinations led to successes that are breathtaking". Aubrey had replaced CBS Television president Louis G. Cowan, who was dismissed after the quiz-show scandals. Aubrey's tough decision-making earned him the nickname "Smiling Cobra" during his tenure.

Despite his success in television, Aubrey's abrasive personality and ego led to his firing from CBS, amid charges of misconduct. Aubrey offered no explanation following his dismissal, nor did CBS President Frank Stanton or Board Chairman William Paley. "The circumstances rivaled the best of CBS adventure or mystery shows," declared The New York Times in its front-page story on his firing, which came on "the sunniest Sunday in February" 1965.

After four years as an independent producer, Aubrey was hired by financier Kirk Kerkorian in 1969 to preside over Metro-Goldwyn-Mayer's (MGM) near-total shutdown, during which he cut the budget and alienated producers and directors, but brought profits to a company that had suffered huge losses. In 1973, Aubrey resigned from MGM, declaring his job was done, and then kept a low profile for the last two decades of his life.

== Early life and career ==
Born in LaSalle, Illinois, James Thomas Steven Aubrey was the eldest of four sons of James Thomas Aubrey Sr., an advertising executive with the Chicago firm of Aubrey, Moore, and Wallace Inc., and his wife, the former Mildred Stever. He grew up in the affluent Chicago suburb of Lake Forest and attended Lake Forest Academy, Phillips Exeter Academy in Exeter, New Hampshire, and Princeton University. All four boys, James, Stever, David, and George, went to the same schools; his brother Stever became a successful advertiser at J. Walter Thompson before heading the F. William Free agency. While at Princeton, all four brothers were members of the Tiger Inn eating club. "My father insisted on accomplishment," Aubrey recalled in 1986.

At Princeton, Aubrey was on the football team, playing left end. The New York Times Magazine described Aubrey as "6-foot 2-inch with an incandescent smile", with "unrevealing polar blue eyes". Life magazine described him as "youthful, handsome, brainy, with an incandescent smile, a quiet, somewhat salty wit, and when he cared to turn it on, considerable charm. He was always fastidiously turned out, from his Jerry the Barber haircut to his CBS-eye cufflinks." One producer said, "Aubrey is one of the most insatiably curious guys I know." He graduated in 1941 with honors in English and entered the United States Army Air Forces. As part of his degree, Aubrey completed a 196-page long senior thesis titled "Fielding's Debt to Cervantes and the Picaresque Tradition."

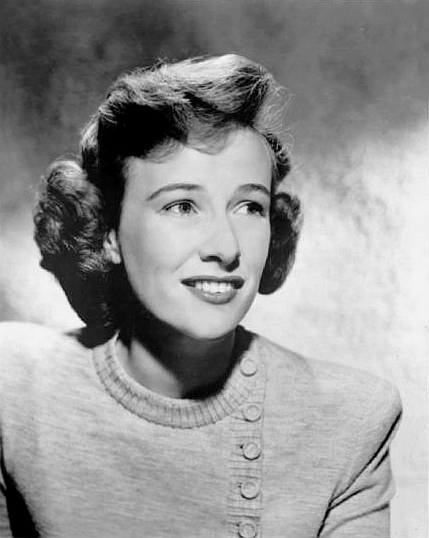
Aubrey's ex-wife, Phyllis Thaxter

During his service in World War II, Aubrey rose to the rank of major and taught military flying to actor James Stewart, who was a licensed civilian pilot. While stationed in Southern California, he met Phyllis Thaxter, an actress signed to MGM, whom he married in November 1944. Thaxter's first role was as Ted Lawson's wife in Thirty Seconds Over Tokyo (1944), and her final film was as Martha Kent, in the 1978 Superman. They had two children, Susan Schuyler "Skye" Aubrey (21 December 1945, Evanston, Illinois to 27 November 2020, DeBary, Florida) and James Watson Aubrey (born 5 January 1953). The couple divorced in 1962.

After being discharged from the Air Force, Aubrey stayed in Southern California; before his marriage, he intended to return to Chicago. In Los Angeles, he sold advertising for the Street & Smith and Condé Nast magazines. His first broadcasting job was as a salesman at the CBS radio station in Los Angeles, KNX, and soon went to the network's new television station, KNXT. Within two years, Aubrey had risen to be the network's West Coast television programming chief. He met Hunt Stromberg Jr., and they developed the popular Western series Have Gun, Will Travel. They sent their idea to the network's chief of programming, Hubbell Robinson, and as journalists Richard Oulahan and William Lambert put it, "the rest is TV history." Aubrey was promoted to manager of all television network programs, based in California, until he went to ABC in 1956.

On December 16, 1956, American Broadcasting Company (ABC) president Oliver E. Treyz announced Aubrey would immediately become the network's head of programming and talent. ABC, the weakest of the three networks at the time, was a contender with a roster of affiliates and programs comparable to the early days of the Fox network. Aubrey later said, "at that time, there was no ABC. The headquarters was an old riding stable, but I went because [ABC chairman] Leonard Goldenson in effect said, 'Look, I don't know that much about TV, I'm a lawyer.' And he let me have autonomy." As vice president of television, a title which Aubrey gained before March 1957, he brought to the air what he recalled as "wild, sexy, lively stuff, things that had never been done before"; shows such as the Walt Disney anthology television series produced by The Walt Disney Company and shows produced by Warner Bros. Television such as Maverick, a Western starring James Garner, and 77 Sunset Strip, a detective show starring Efrem Zimbalist Jr.

Oulahan and Lambert said that "Highbrow critics were pained", but Aubrey scheduled "one lucrative show after another [...] and for the first time, the third network became a serious challenge to NBC and CBS." Among the successes he scheduled were: The Donna Reed Show, a domestic comedy; The Rifleman, a Western with Chuck Connors, and The Real McCoys, a rural comedy with Walter Brennan and Richard Crenna.

== President of CBS Television (1959–1965) ==
Despite his success at ABC, Aubrey saw a limited future at the network and asked to return to CBS. He returned on April 28, 1958, initially as an assistant to Frank Stanton, the president of CBS Inc., which owned the network. Thomas W. Moore would later replace Aubrey at ABC. At CBS, Aubrey was appointed as vice president for creative services in April 1959, replacing Louis G. Cowan, whom CBS promoted to network president.

Aubrey was named executive vice president on June 1, 1959, a newly created position that was the number-two official at the network. His responsibilities involved general supervision of all departments of the CBS Television Network. On December 8, 1959, Cowan resigned, having been damaged from his connection to the quiz-show scandals. Cowan had created the show The $64,000 Question, and owned the company that produced it for the network, although Cowan denied he knew anything about the rigging of the program. Cowan's letter of resignation to Stanton declared, "you have made it impossible for me to continue". Aubrey was appointed president the same day and elected to the board of directors on December 9, 1959.

Aubrey served as a successful president of the CBS Network for the next five years. Oulahan and Lambert later described him as the first network president who was both "fiscal wizard and a showman"; CBS increased ratings and profits, from $25 million to $39 million. In the 1963–64 season, 14 of the top-15 primetime shows were on CBS, an accomplishment Variety later compared to Joe DiMaggio's 56-game hitting streak. The lone evening exception was NBC's Bonanza, the first color one hour Western ranked number two. 12 of the top daytime programs were also on CBS. Oulahan and Lambert wrote after his firing:

In the long history of human communications, from tom-tom to Telstar, no one man ever had a lock on such enormous audiences as James Thomas Aubrey Jr. during his five-year tenure as head of the Columbia Broadcasting System's television network [...] He was the world's No. 1 purveyor of entertainment.

=== Aubrey's formula ===
I'd become convinced Beverly Hillbillies was going to work. Bill Paley wasn't convinced. Bill has this great sense of propriety. Putting aside the Sarnoffs and all the other great names of broadcasting, Paley [...] had this blasting genius of instinctively looking at a show and knowing if it should be on the air. He could also be ruthless and distant [...] But Bill was intuitive about both the business and creative sides of TV. And he genuinely disliked Beverly Hillbillies. I put it on the schedule anyway.

— Aubrey on Paley and his programming choices, 1986

Aubrey's formula was characterized by a CBS executive as "broads, bosoms, and fun". He was said to have a "smell for the blue-collar", resulting in such shows as The Beverly Hillbillies and Gilligan's Island, despised by the critics and by CBS chairman William S. Paley, but extremely popular with viewers. ABC's Treyz said of his programming: "Jim Aubrey was one of the most effective ever, from the standpoint of delivering what the public wanted and making money. He was the best program judge in the business". While Aubrey had great sense for what would be popular with viewers, he also showed contempt for them. "The American public is something I fly over", he reportedly said.

Author David Halberstam called Aubrey, "The hucksters' huckster [...] whose greatest legacy to television was a program called The Beverly Hillbillies, a series so demented and tasteless that it boggles the mind". Besides Paley, Stanton and Michael Dann were among others at CBS that disliked the show. Columnist Murray Kempton described Hillbillies as "a confrontation of the characters of John Steinbeck with the environment of Spyros Skouras", the chairman of 20th Century Fox. Despite the criticism of Hillbillies, the program was popular with audiences. Nielsen ratings showed that 57 million viewers were watching the show—one in three Americans. Its popularity saved The Dick Van Dyke Show, scheduled behind it, and resulted in the spinoffs Petticoat Junction and Green Acres. Skouras was forced out of Fox by the company's board of directors in July 1962; Aubrey was rumored to be his successor, but he openly denied he had any intention of leaving CBS.

Another part of Aubrey's formula was ensuring that the commercial interests of CBS's sponsors were kept foremost in their minds. In 1960, he elaborated on this idea more when he told the Office of Network Study:

There is relatively little that is incompatible between our objectives and the objectives of the advertisers... Before sponsorship of a program series commences there is often a meeting between production personnel and representatives of the advertiser at which time the general areas of the advertiser's interest and general attitudes are discussed. A breakfast food advertiser may, for example, wish to make sure the programs do not contain elements that make breakfast distasteful. A cigarette manufacturer would not wish to have cigarette smoking depicted in an unattractive manner. Normally, as long as these considerations do not limit creativity, they will be adhered to.

=== Dominance and controversy ===
CBS became so influential that when the fall schedules were announced, ABC and NBC would wait until CBS announced its rota before making plans to keep up, effectively making Aubrey programmer for all three networks. CBS enjoyed success with rural-themed sitcoms such as the Hillbillies, The Andy Griffith Show, Mister Ed, Green Acres, and Petticoat Junction. Paley highly disliked the CBS hit The Munsters, part of a trend of fantasy shows at the time that included CBS's My Favorite Martian and Gilligan's Island, but did not interfere with Aubrey's decisions; Dann later said "It was the only time in CBS history that Paley completely abdicated running the network". Aubrey's "unwritten code" for programs was described in Life magazine:

Feed the public little more than rural comedies, fast-moving detective dramas, and later, sexy dolls. No old people; the emphasis was on youth. No domestic servants, the mass audience wouldn't identify with maids. No serious problems to cope with. Every script had to be full of action. No physical infirmities.

Exceptions existed, such as The Defenders with E.G. Marshall and Robert Reed as socially conscious attorneys, which ran for four years, or East Side/West Side with George C. Scott as a New York City social worker, which was cancelled after just one season despite receiving eight Emmy Award nominations. Aubrey defended charges of pandering to the public. "I felt that we had an obligation to reach the vast majority of most of the people", he said. "We made an effort to continue purposeful drama on TV, but we found out that people just don't want an anthology. They would rather tune in on Lucy". Receptive of the nation becoming tired of high-culture programming and turning to sitcoms, Aubrey contributed to the "vast wasteland" of inferior TV.

In 1962, a United States Senate committee investigating juvenile delinquency held hearings on sex on television and called executives from the three networks. The chairman, Senator Thomas J. Dodd, blasted "an unmistakable pattern", and informed the executives "you all seem to use the same terminology—to think alike—and to jam this stuff down the people's throat". Dodd accused Aubrey of putting "prurient sex" in the program Route 66 to boost ratings, and confronted him with the "bosoms, broads, and fun" quotation from a memorandum by CBS executive Howard G. Barnes following a meeting with the program's producers. Aubrey denied saying the phrase. He said that people in the business often shorthanded "wholesome, pretty girls" as "broads", and "attractive" as "bosoms". Another memorandum summarizing the same meeting, written by Screen Gems executive William Dozier, wrote: "There is not enough sex in the programs. Neither lead has gotten involved even for a single episode with the normal wants of a young man, namely to get involved with a girl or even to kiss her".

=== Management style ===
Aubrey was known for his fast decision-making, controlling and workaholic tendencies, putting in 12-hour days, six days a week. He endlessly read scripts, screened episodes, and ordered reshoots or changes made in the furniture and dressing of a set. Author Murray Kempton wrote that he would see six films every weekend and read three books on transcontinental flights. Kempton quoted a CBS executive, saying:

He read everything. Like he saw every movie. But he had the smallest world there could be. He'd watch a movie, and while everyone else was involved in the story, he'd say out loud "that kid could be the lead in a television program." He read everything sure. All the new fiction. What he didn't like was Bellow, Updike, Cheever, Salinger, Capote, and Mailer. He didn't know how to use them.

Oulahan and Lambert wrote, "Aubrey exercised his tremendous power with the canny skill and the ruthlessness of a Tatar khan". By 1959, Aubrey's treachery led the producer John Houseman to dub him "the Smiling Cobra". In December 1962, CBS announced it was spending $250,000 an episode on Houseman's hour-long drama on American history for the next season, The Great Adventure, but on July 25, 1963, CBS announced Houseman had resigned. The producer told The New York Times, "The kind of show they want is not what I wanted to produce", but attributed his departure to a simple difference of opinion, the Times reporter stating Houseman "expressed no criticism of CBS". The show ran for one season, 1963–64.

[Aubrey] was the fourth president of CBS-TV as Caligula was the fourth of the 12 Caesars. Each carried the logic of his imperial authority as far as it could go. Each was deposed and disappeared suddenly, leaving bad press behind him.

— Author Murray Kempton on Aubrey

In his book Only You, Dick Daring!, Merle Miller described how he spent five-and-a-half months trying to make a show with CBS for the 1963–64 season based on an idea of Aubrey's about a county agent. Aubrey would walk out of meetings without offering any constructive comments on Miller's program and the 19 rewrites he did of the pilot episode. Miller was assured by executives that Aubrey's silence meant things were fine; Kempton quoted a CBS producer telling Miller "this has nothing to do with a good script or a bad script. It has to do with pleasing one man, Jim Aubrey. Don't ever forget it", and Miller later learned of efforts by Aubrey to force him out. A pilot for the show, Calhoun and County Agent, starring Jackie Cooper and Barbara Stanwyck, was shot and put on the fall schedule, but the series was cancelled before it aired. Miller quoted an independent producer: "Aubrey's the most important man in television, in the history of television, maybe in the history of entertainment. He out-Mayers Louis B. Mayer ten times over".

Aubrey's success caused him instability and he became more arrogant. He was abusive to the network's affiliates, advertisers, producers, and talent. Friends including producers Dick Dorso of United Artists, Martin Ransohoff of Filmways, and David Susskind, who had each sold several series to CBS, found themselves excluded. "He's a friend of mine, but he cut me stone cold last year", Susskind said. "I was hanging there with my pants down, wondering what I'd tell the stockholders". Gossip columnist Liz Smith, who worked at CBS, called him a "a mean, hateful, truly scary, bad, outré guy". Studio executive Sherry Lansing, a close friend of Aubrey's for two decades, told the Los Angeles Times in 1986:

Jim is different. He does his own dirty work. Jim is one of those people who are willing to say, "I didn't like your movie." Directness is disarming to people who are used to sugar-coating. It's tough for people who need approval to see somebody who doesn't. Myths and legends begin to surround that kind of person.

In the 1950s, entertainer Garry Moore wanted to make a comeback on CBS but Aubrey told him "not a chance". However, long after Aubrey left the company, in the fall of 1966, Moore did get a chance with a short-lived revival of his weekly variety series. John Frankenheimer, critically acclaimed as the number-one director of live TV dramas during the 1950s, was forced out by Aubrey in 1960. Frankenheimer found a new career as a film director, for which he is now arguably best known, although he had wanted to continue in television. Frankenheimer once publicly called Aubrey a "barbarian".

The star of CBS's The Lucy Show had disputes with Aubrey. "Lucille Ball couldn't say his name without calling him an S.O.B.", Stanton said, though Kempton quoted her after Aubrey's firing as saying "he was the smartest one up there". Aubrey also rescheduled Jack Benny's long-running series without consulting him. Benny, a friend of Paley's since luring the comedian to CBS in 1948, objected to his new lead-in on Tuesdays for the 1963–64 season, Petticoat Junction, instead of the previous season's The Red Skelton Hour. Then in the summer of 1963, Aubrey told Benny his show would not be renewed at the end of the forthcoming season; Aubrey thought Benny was no longer current. "You're through, old man", Aubrey told him. Benny took his show back to NBC, but ended the show after only one season, proving Aubrey's point if not his tactics. Aubrey also had disagreements with Red Skelton, Danny Thomas, Judy Garland, and Arthur Godfrey.

Allegations of favoritism in purchasing programs were made against Aubrey. His friend Keefe Brasselle, who had had minor film roles in the 1940s and 1950s, and met Aubrey when they both worked at KNXT, had no experience as a producer. David Susskind called Brasselle "a 1965 edition of George Raft", as there were also rumors Brasselle had ties to the Mafia. Nevertheless, Aubrey scheduled three shows from Brasselle's Richelieu Productions for the 1964–65 season, without pilot episodes. The shows were The Baileys of Balboa, a sitcom with Paul Ford; the newspaper drama The Reporter; and The Cara Williams Show, a sitcom starring Williams. Brasselle would personally supervise The Reporter, shot in New York City. Costs skyrocketed on Brasselle's shows; after nine episodes, The Reporter was $450,000 over budget, and ran only for three months. Baileys ran until April 1965, and Cara Williams finished after one season; all three shows were commercial failures, although Oulahan and Lambert described them as "no better and no worse than most of the new shows". When Aubrey was later asked why he aired three untested programs, he responded with "arrogance, I guess".

In his book The Other Glass Teat, media critic Harlan Ellison alleges that a Mafia don had put out a contract on Aubrey for beating his daughter during consensual sex at a Las Vegas hotel, and that Brasselle demanded the shows in exchange for his using his own Mafia connections to smooth things over. Aubrey's critics acknowledged that he could be charming and went to great lengths to please performers. To keep Jackie Gleason happy when he moved his show from New York City to Miami Beach in 1963, Aubrey had CBS buy Gleason's $350,000 futuristic home in Peekskill, New York; The New York Times called it "a flying saucer-like cabana". The network was still trying to sell it years later.

=== News and sports ===
Aubrey disliked not having control of the autonomous CBS News and fought constantly with its officials, especially its chief, Fred W. Friendly, who was just as demanding and controlling as Aubrey. Friendly felt Aubrey was unconcerned with public affairs; in his memoir, Due to Circumstances Beyond Our Control, Friendly recounts one budget meeting in which Aubrey talked at length about the high costs of airing news, which could be cheaply replaced with entertainment programs. However, Paley supported the news and protected Friendly's division from Aubrey's proposed budget cuts. In 1962, Aubrey ordered that there would be fewer specials, entertainment and news, because he felt interruptions to the schedule alienated viewers by disrupting their routine viewing, sending them to the competition. Friendly resented this move.

In the fall of 1962, CBS Reports, a news-documentary program on Wednesdays was blamed by the press for the sharp drop-off in the ratings of The Beverly Hillbillies, the comedy had been number one in its first two seasons, but dropped to 18th when CBS Reports became the Hillbillies lead-in for its third season. Hillbillies had aired at 9:00 before moving up a half hour in 1964; CBS responded by moving CBS Reports to Mondays.

On May 9, 1963, Aubrey warned the network's affiliates the high cost of rights for professional sports could price them off television; nevertheless, in January 1964 CBS agreed to pay $28.2 million to air the games of the National Football League for two years, 17 games each season. "We know how much these games mean to the viewing audience, our affiliated stations, and the nation's advertisers", Aubrey told The New York Times. In April 1964, he agreed to extend the deal for another year for $31.8 million. In the spring of 1964, The New York Times Magazine declared CBS "for the 10th year in a row [...] was the undisputed champion of the television networks". An analyst said CBS was "almost comparable to what General Motors did in autos or what General Electric [did] in electrical equipment".

=== Dismissal ===
On April 16, 1964, celebrity tabloid Close-Up reported that Aubrey was taking kickbacks from producers. The Federal Communications Commission (FCC) made inquiries, and CBS learned that despite his $264,000 annual salary from the company, Aubrey's apartment on Manhattan's Central Park South was owned by Martin Ransohoff, the head of Filmways, the producer of many CBS programs. The lease stated that Filmways would pay for part of Aubrey's rent and Aubrey would share the apartment with Filmways visitors, resulting in the bizarre situation of a network president with clients as roommates. Although he had a chauffeur-driven car paid for by the network, Brasselle's Richelieu Productions was paying for another chauffeured car for Aubrey. CBS had no knowledge of the apartment or car; the company was also concerned about the money spent to buy Gleason's former home.

There are at least 13,000 theories on why he [Aubrey] got the ax, some of them lurid, but none as obvious as the fact that CBS was starting to slip in the Nielsens. "And there was a basic dissatisfaction with me," as he put it. If Aubrey understood ratings and revenue, he also was no stranger to a kind of after-hours recklessness that mirrored the Camelot of its day. Nobody questions that Jungle Jim had a good time in the playgrounds of Manhattan and Hollywood.

— Paul Rosenfield of the Los Angeles Times, 1986

Both Paley and Stanton were older than Aubrey, and Paley reportedly feared that if something were to happen to them, Aubrey would take over the company. Paley reportedly told Stanton in late 1964 "Frank, he's got to go". The Internal Revenue Service tax lien against Aubrey for $38,047.93 was another irritant for Paley. Aubrey seemed to have lost his touch; the early ratings for the 1964–65 season showed that new programs were flops. He turned down Bewitched, which became a hit for ABC, and Dan Melnick did not offer Get Smart to CBS because of the dispute between Aubrey and Melnick's partner Susskind. Programs like Bewitched and Peyton Place showed that other networks successfully emulated Aubrey's formula.

The decision to fire Aubrey was reportedly made by February 1965, before Paley's Caribbean vacation. Rumors said that Aubrey's job was at risk, but he told a friend "How can Paley ax me when I've made him $40 million?" CBS was still the ratings leader, so Paley and Stanton had no pretext for firing Aubrey until he went to Florida for Jackie Gleason's 49th birthday party, after which he went to a "raucous and wild party" elsewhere which the police visited. No one was arrested, but Paley immediately returned from the vacation and told Aubrey to return to New York. Paley ordered Stanton to fire Aubrey, and he did so on February 27, 1965, though the announcement was delayed until the following Sunday afternoon. Stanton's statement read, "Jim Aubrey's outstanding accomplishment during his tenure as head of the C.B.S. television network need no elaboration. His extraordinary record speaks for itself". Aubrey offered no explanation following his dismissal, nor did Stanton or Paley give an explicit reason. The New York Times Magazine wrote, "Aubrey was torpedoed at last [...] by a combination of his imperiousness, the ratings drop, and a vivid after-hours life culminating in a raucous Miami Beach party—details of which no one ever agrees on—the weekend he was fired".

Aubrey said, "I don't pretend to be any saint. If anyone wants to indict me for liking pretty girls, I'm guilty". Skye Aubrey said that her family broke up because Aubrey stayed in New York while Phyllis Thaxter was working in Hollywood; while "women were practically throwing themselves at him ... Putting business and career first broke up the Family. He was all into business". Oulahan and Lambert wrote that after his divorce in 1962, Aubrey was able to "live the high life around New York, Hollywood, Miami, and in Europe with such companions as Judy Garland, Julie Newmar, Rhonda Fleming—and with other dolls who were only faces and figures, not names". His parties and dating history became widely discussed. Paul Rosenfield of the Los Angeles Times described the temptation of gossip columnists to write about Aubrey, but the material about him could not be verified—"tempting, but mostly unprintable".

Aubrey's successor was announced as John A. Schneider; the firing was so sudden that Schneider was offered the job the same day. The general manager of WCBS-TV in New York City for five months, he had no experience in network television. "One of the things I have accomplished", Schendier said, "is to create an atmosphere in which everybody can get along". Aubrey became depressed, and Stanton feared he was suicidal. Wall Street was also affected as CBS stock fell by nine points over the following week. The stock tumble "puts my net value to the network at $20 million", Aubrey said. He continued to be a CBS employee until April 20.

Following his dismissal, Jack Gould, television critic for The New York Times, opined:

[Aubrey] symbolized an era in television that has been and is too much rooted in calculated and insensitive preoccupation with making more money this year than last [...] Automated situation comedies that wooed the young and did not drive away the old were the mainstay of his philosophy and they paid off.

Oulahan and Lambert wrote: "This much is certain: John Schneider will never exercise the broad programming power his free-wheeling predecessor held. It is doubtful whether anyone in television ever will again".

== Post-CBS career (1966–1968) ==
Aubrey left CBS with $2.5 million in network stock, and moved to the Sunset Strip and set up a production company, The Aubrey Company. His attorney, Gregson E. Bautzer, in 1967 tried to buy ABC for another client, the Las Vegas-based millionaire Howard Hughes. Aubrey was to run ABC after the takeover, but the reclusive Hughes refused to testify in person at hearings before the FCC, which had to approve the purchase, and the deal collapsed.

In June 1967, Aubrey signed a two-year contract to produce films for Columbia Pictures. Despite being rumored as a candidate for many posts in the entertainment industry, Aubrey told Vincent Canby of The New York Times he had "no desire ever again to become involved in the corporate side of the entertainment business", and had been, in Canby's words, "dabbling in a number of enterprises, including the acquisition of films for TV, real estate, and cultured pearls." In 1965, Oulahan and Lambert wrote he had "extensive investments in everything from copper mines to a chain of waffle shops." His first project for Columbia was to be an adaptation of a Patricia Highsmith book, Those Who Walk Away. "The criterion is profitable entertainment," he told Canby.

== President of MGM (1969–1973) ==
Aubrey resurfaced in 1969 when Las Vegas businessman Kirk Kerkorian took control of Metro-Goldwyn-Mayer (MGM), ousting Canadian liquor magnate Edgar M. Bronfman, who had gained control earlier that year. Aubrey's attorney Gregson E. Bautzer also represented Kerkorian, and Bautzer recommended Aubrey for the MGM post. Aubrey was announced as MGM president on October 21, 1969; he was Kerkorian's third choice after producers Herb Jaffe and Mike Frankovich both declined the post, while producer Ray Stark was also considered. Aubrey replaced the fired Louis F. Polk Jr., who had been MGM president since only January 14. Aubrey was the studio's third president that year. Polk told The New York Times, "no one likes to leave a job unfinished," and said he had started much-needed reforms at the studio, which suffered a $35 million loss in the fiscal year ending August 31, 1969.

Aubrey received a salary of $4,000 a week, but had no contract. He said in 1986, "I wanted Kirk to be able to say, 'Get lost, Jim,' without obligation if it didn't work." Like most of the big studios in the 1960s, MGM was struggling and Kerkorian said his new president would bring the company back to its former glory. Instead, Aubrey largely liquidated the company as Kerkorian transformed it into hospitality-oriented with construction of the MGM Grand Hotel. "We've been using old-fashioned methods here," Aubrey said. He later said in 1986, that the company was "total disarray. Until you were in a position to lift up the rug, there was no way to know how much disarray. The crown jewel of studios had become a shambles."

Within days of Aubrey assuming the role, he cancelled 12 films to cut costs, among them Fred Zinnemann's Man's Fate, which was about to begin principal photography. Aubrey terminated 3,500 employees when he relocated headquarters from New York City to Culver City to be closer to production facilities, a move which was announced on April 29, 1970. He ordered the sale of MGM's historical collection of costumes and props such as the ruby slippers worn by Judy Garland in The Wizard of Oz, Vivien Leigh's dresses from Gone with the Wind, and the suit Spencer Tracy wore in Inherit the Wind. The suit was eventually bought by one of Charles Manson's defense attorneys who wore it regularly to court. Most of the studio's Culver City backlot and its 2,000 acre (8 km^{2}) ranch in the Conejo Valley were sold to real estate developers; these actions were already planned under Polk. Aubrey was heavily criticized for disposing of MGM's archives and halting productions. He recalled in 1986, "the buck had to stop somewhere, and it was with me. Nostalgia runs strong out here, so we were criticized for selling Judy Garland's red shoes. To us they had no value, and they had no intrinsic value."

His actions had a positive effect on the company's finances. In his first nine months on the job, he cut MGM's debt by $27 million, nearly one-quarter of the total, and the company posted profits of $540,000 for those nine months compared to a $18.3 million loss in the preceding period.

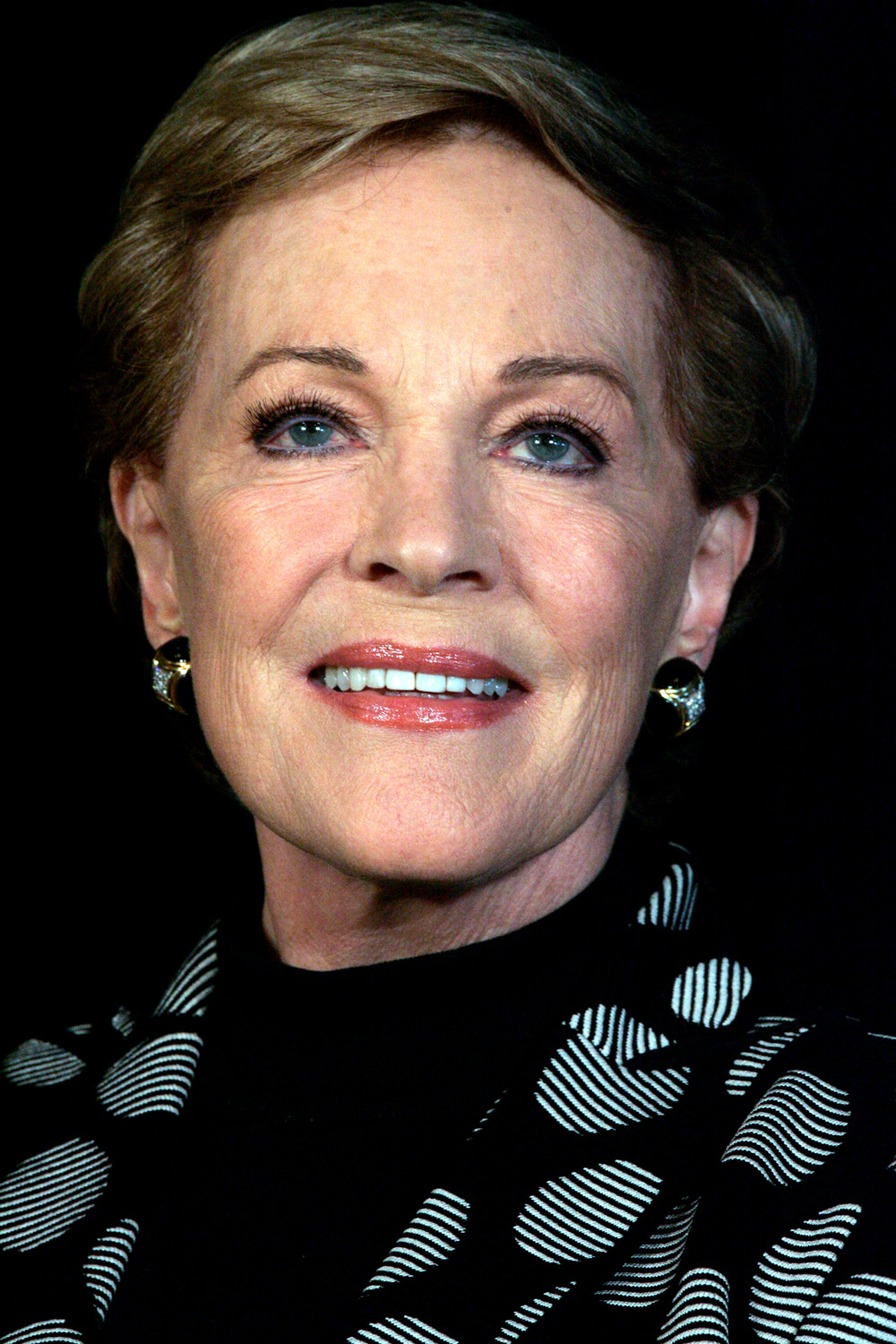
Aubrey cancelled two of Julie Andrews' films.

=== Streamlining ===
Losses were great because Polk wrote off as total losses many films made under his predecessors; the company posted a $35.4 million loss in the fiscal year ending August 31, 1969. "Basically what we're really concentrating on at the moment is to really streamline this operation. There isn't much else to do when you're losing as much money as we are", Aubrey told The New York Times in December 1969. Aubrey said, "we have determined that we're not going to continue to produce on the basis of 40 acres and acres and acres of standing sets. Young people who are the major movie audience today, refer to that as the plastic world and that is almost a deterrent in the business today."

Aubrey announced plans for rapid production of low budget films that cost no more than $2 million each, but many of these bombed with critics and audiences. One success, however, was the Richard Roundtree film Shaft, which cost $1 million and grossed around $12 million at the box office. Agent Sue Mengers said he was a very tough deal-maker; "I'd rather go to bed with him than negotiate with him." Early in, Aubrey cancelled the production of two Julie Andrews films, She Loves Me and Say It With Music, citing that the fad for musicals had ended. He also unsuccessfully attempted to cancel or downsize David Lean's Ryan's Daughter in 1970, because it was over budget.

In the first half of fiscal 1970, the company made $6.5 million profit despite sizable write-offs. The company had significantly cut its operating losses from $6.5 million to $1.6 million. Aubrey told the press in April 1970 that the company would have made money if not for four films: Herbert Ross's musical adaptation of James Hilton's novel Goodbye, Mr. Chips starring Peter O'Toole and Petula Clark; Michelangelo Antonioni's Zabriskie Point, a film Pauline Kael called "a huge, jerry-built crumbling ruin of a movie"; the adventure Captain Nemo and the Underwater City with Robert Ryan and Chuck Connors, and Sidney Lumet's The Appointment with Omar Sharif, Anouk Aimée, and Lotte Lenya. These four pictures cost almost $20 million to produce and each failed to break even. In that same month, Vincent Canby wrote in The New York Times, "the fickle tastes of the movie-going audience have made a large part of [studios' film] inventory obsolete."

By the end of the fiscal year, MGM made a profit of $1.5 million, a remarkable turnaround for a company which posted a $35 million loss one year before. In January 1971, Aubrey declared, "we are pleased that the company has been turned around. Through the policies of this management, including a complete reorganization, substantial economies, consolidation of operations and through better performance of recent films, we have been able to operate substantially in the black." In that same month, Aubrey announced the company was in merger talks with 20th Century Fox, days after Fox fired its top executives, Richard D. Zanuck and David Brown. Two weeks later, he announced the talks had ended. However, Darryl F. Zanuck, chairman and CEO of Fox, publicly denied any negotiations. "There have not been and are not now and are not scheduled for the future any discussions concerning a merger or any other type of combination between our two companies," he told the press.

=== Practical approach ===
Aubrey was hands-on with MGM's work, personally making edits to films. The New York Times Magazine wrote, "Aubrey's heavy involvement with every creative detail of MGM's pictures far surpassed his immersal in CBS's scripts". After making edits to the film Going Home starring Robert Mitchum, director Herbert B. Leonard publicly protested. "He unilaterally and arbitrarily raped the picture", he told Time magazine in 1971. Director Blake Edwards was angry with changes Aubrey made to the film Wild Rovers with William Holden, telling The New York Times Magazine, "Cuts? He doesn't know as much as a first-year cinema student. He cut the heart right out of it". Television producer Bruce Geller, who created the Mission: Impossible series, had his name removed from the credits of his first film, Corky, because of Aubrey's edits. The producer of the film Chandler, Michael S. Laughlin, and its director, Paul Magwood, took out a full-page advert in the trade papers declaring:

Regarding what was our film Chandler, let's give credit where credit is due. We sadly acknowledge that all editing, post-production as well as additional scenes were executed by James T. Aubrey Jr. We are sorry.

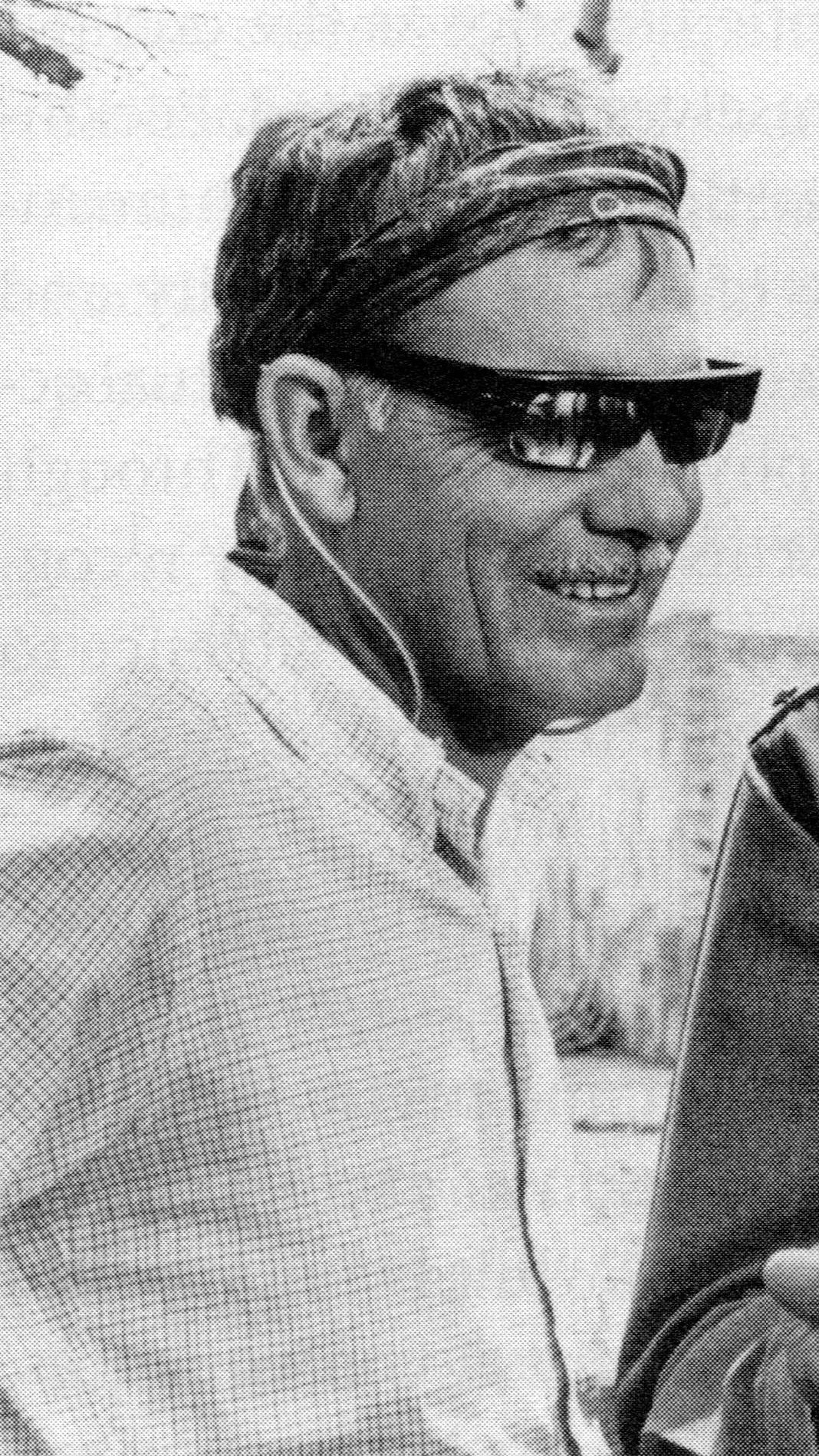
Aubrey clashed with director Sam Peckinpah.

Laughlin told Time magazine, "You just can't deal with Aubrey. He realizes that litigation can be a great expense, and that because of legal delays, the film will have disappeared long before your case comes to court". Aubrey engaged in another infamous feud with Sam Peckinpah, who in 1973 began work on the Western Pat Garrett and Billy the Kid. Aubrey cut Peckinpah's budget early in production, preventing him from reshooting crucial footage, pushing back the release date to Memorial Day, and cutting nearly 20 minutes of the film. Editor Roger Spottiswoode said, "Aubrey was ordering scenes cut out for no other reason except he knew Sam didn't want them cut". Film critic John Simon wrote Aubrey "deserves to be made a honorary or, rather, dishonorable member of the film editor's union".

MGM had disagreements with the Motion Picture Association of America (MPAA) and its film rating system which had been instituted in 1968. MGM resigned from the MPAA in 1971 over the issue of ratings and "exorbitant dues charges", Aubrey said. In October 1971, MGM announced that it was to build the world's largest hotel in Las Vegas (MGM Grand Hotel), and was to enter the cruise ship business. The next month, the company announced fiscal 1971 profits of $16.3 million, a sharp rise from the $1.6 million in fiscal 1970, and the highest in a quarter century.

After four years at MGM, Aubrey announced his resignation, declaring, "The job I agreed to undertake has been accomplished". Kerkorian was named as his successor on October 31, 1973. Time magazine declared, "Under Aubrey, MGM churned out profitable, medium-budget schlock like Skyjacked and Black Belly of the Tarantula; directors often charged him with philistine meddling, and he alienated many of them", but "as a financial auteur, Aubrey may have deserved an Oscar". Others agreed with Max Palevsky, who said that Aubrey had improved MGM "by selling off any part of the company that was profitable so that he could cover up his mistakes". "He made inexpensive films, which was a good idea, but they were almost uniformly bad, which wasn't", Canby wrote: "When there was any chance that a film might be good, he, or someone else, interfered in the production".

== Final years (1974–1994) ==
In 1978, Aubrey and Sherry Lansing were struck by a car while crossing Wilshire Boulevard. The pair sustained injuries; Lansing was on crutches for a year and a half, and Aubrey nursed her back to health. "He came every day. He would say, 'You're not going to limp.' My own mother and father couldn't give me more support," Lansing told Variety magazine in 2004.

Aubrey became an independent producer after leaving MGM, producing ten unmemorable films. His biggest success was a 1979 television film about the Dallas Cowboys Cheerleaders starring Jane Seymour. While mostly avoiding publicity, in the mid-1980s, he was chairman of Entermark, a production company that made low-budget films and was backed by several wealthy Texans, including former governor John Connally. "Our theory is that with today's ancillary rights, there is real profit in a movie that costs $3 million. We don't need to gross $40 million, or open on Christmas Day", he said. To publicize this venture, he granted a rare interview with the Los Angeles Times in 1986. Paul Rosenfield found him unrepentant:

Aubrey doesn't deny that he shoots from the hip, in a style that can unhinge the fragile egos of show business. "If I was in the tire business," reasoned Aubrey, "I wouldn't be hurt if the customer didn't buy my tires. I'd think, 'So what?' But in my business, if I don't buy the script, then the writer kicks the dog and beats his wife. So you learn to pay attention to personal relationships. But that doesn't mean you lie to people. I've been the screwer and the screwee, and I know which is better. It's better to be the screwer, and it's very difficult to do that with honesty, but it's how I prefer to be treated. I don't want power now, or authority, so I suppose my candor can't hurt me.

Gossip columnist Liz Smith reported this profile of Aubrey had led to rumors he would again return to head CBS after Paley was forced out in 1986 when Laurence Tisch acquired the network. Aubrey worked as a consultant for Brandon Tartikoff during the 1980s and early 1990s, while Tartikoff worked to restore the reputation of NBC. Aubrey was living with his daughter Skye with, she said, little money, and died of a heart attack at UCLA Medical Center on September 3, 1994, at the age of 75.

== Legacy ==
Aubrey's outsized reputation, appearance and womanizing, and his dramatic exit from CBS inspired characters in three novels. Brasselle wrote The CanniBalS: A Novel About Television's Savage Chieftains (1968), the title of which had very unsubtle capitalization and was, in Nora Ephron's assessment, "unreadable." Harold Robbins's The Inheritors (1969) and Jacqueline Susann's The Love Machine (1969) also contained characters based on him. In Susann's book, Aubrey is network executive Robin Stone. Rosenfield said Aubrey had "quietly cooperated" with Susann, "giving her background on TV", although Susann's husband, Irving Mansfield, had been a busy TV producer himself, before switching to managing his wife's career full-time. Susann said Aubrey, her neighbor, was "one of those people who are born to run the works. A natural for a novel". In a 1969 New York Times article, Ephron quoted Aubrey as instructing Susann to "make me mean. Make me a son-of-a-bitch". Skye Aubrey starred in a 1974 TV movie, The Phantom of Hollywood, about a ruthless movie executive who sells the studio backlot and memorabilia.

Television historian Terence Towles Canote wrote in 2008 that Aubrey's preferences helped reverse the late-1950s trend toward family comedy on the Big Three television networks, causing a megacycle of broad, escapist comedy and imaginative television during the 1960s. Although mostly forgotten—a CBS publicist did not recognize Aubrey's name in 2004—Variety that year wrote that "His legacy has actually become a part of TV lore", noting that "TV Land treats many of the shows Aubrey put on the air as crowning achievements, not idiotcoms ... Many of the hick-coms now make it on lists of the best sitcoms of all time". The magazine said that "Aubrey's tastes for 'broads, bosoms and fun' could today be called the elements of a successful reality series" like The Simple Life.

Describing Aubrey as having an unfair reputation of only airing schlock, Robert Thompson of Syracuse University's Center for the Study of Popular Television cited The Defenders and East Side/West Side, and described Hillbillies as "the clash of folk art and greedy consumerism". Noting that "A lot of that 'schlock TV' is still playing", Skye Aubrey quoted her father as saying "Remember that TV is not for people living in New York and California. It's for the world and the masses. They want to be entertained".

== Select films made/released at MGM under Aubrey ==
- Zabriskie Point (1970) (February 1970) - this was greenlit before Aubrey became president
- The Moonshine War (July 1970)
- No Blade of Grass (October 1970) - made by MGM British under Robert Littman
- The Traveling Executioner (October 1970)
- Ryan's Daughter (November 1970) - this was greenlit before Aubrey became president
- Brewster McCloud (December 1970)
- Get Carter (February 1971) - made by MGM British under Robert Littman - latre remade as Hit Man
- Pretty Maids All in a Row (May 1971)
- Fortune and Men's Eyes (June 1971) - Canadian film
- Shaft (June 1971) - box office hit, led to two sequels
- The Wild Rovers (June 1971) - post production controversy
- The Last Run (July 1971) - made by MGM British, director replaced during filming
- The Go-Between (September 1971) - MGM British - MGM sold interest to Columbia
- Chandler (December 1971) - post production controversy
- Going Home (December 1971) - post production controversy
- Believe in Me (December 1971) - Aubrey demanded reshoots
- The Gang That Couldn't Shoot Straight (December 1971)
- The Boyfriend (December 1971) - made by MGM British (MGM-EMI), post production controversy
- Corky (March 1972) - post production controversy
- The Carey Treatment (March 1972) - post production controversy
- Skyjacked (May 1972)
- Sitting Target (May 1972) - MGM British
- Shaft's Big Score! (June 1972)
- The Jerusalem File (June 1972)
- Every Little Crook and Nanny (June 1972)
- One is a Lonely Number (June 1972)
- Night of the Lepus (July 1972)
- The Wrath of God (July 1972)
- Cool Breeze (July 1972) - remake of The Asphalt Jungle, from Gene Corman
- Kansas City Bomber (August 1972)
- Melinda (August 1972)
- Private Parts (Sept 1972) - from Gene Corman
- Savage Messiah (Sept 1972) - made by MGM British
- They Only Kill Their Masters (Nov 1972)
- Elvis on Tour (Nov 1972)
- Hit Man (Dec 1972) - remake of Get Carter from Gene Corman
- Travels with My Aunt (December 1972)
- Pat Garrett and Billy the Kid (May 1973) - post production controversy
- Shaft in Africa (June 1973)
- Trader Horn (June 1973)
- The Man Who Loved Cat Dancing (June 1973)
- Westworld (August 1973)
- The Slams (Sept 1973) - from Gene Corman
- The Outfit (October 1973)

== See also ==
- Rural purge
