= Once Is Not Enough =

1973 novel by Jacqueline Susann

- First edition cover
- Author: Jacqueline Susann
- Language: English
- Publisher: William Morrow
- Publication date: March 20, 1973
- Publication place: United States
- Media type: Print (hardcover and paperback)
- Pages: 467 pp (First edition, cloth)

Once Is Not Enough is the third novel by Jacqueline Susann, published in 1973 following her huge bestsellers Valley of the Dolls (1966) and The Love Machine (1969). With Once Is Not Enough, Susann became the first writer in publishing history to have three consecutive #1 novels on the New York Times Best Seller list.

== Plot summary ==
January Wayne, daughter of film and stage producer Mike Wayne, returns to New York City after being hospitalized in Switzerland for nearly three years. The environment has changed since her departure.

January encounters Deirdre Milford Granger, David Milford, and Linda Riggs, the editor of Gloss magazine. Other individuals include the novelist Tom Colt, Dr. Preston Alpert, and Karla, a former film actress.

The story reflects the social upheavals of the late 1960s and early 1970s.

== Background ==
Jacqueline Susann initially called the novel The Big Man but changed her mind after visiting comedian Joe E. Lewis on his deathbed. Lewis, who had famously said, "You only live once—but if you work it right, once is enough," apparently reconsidered, for he told Susann, "Once is not enough."

Susann was diagnosed with cancer two months before the book's scheduled publication date. Her usual efforts at promotion—including a grueling book tour—had to be curtailed. But Susann soldiered on; as her husband, Irving Mansfield, said, "The day the book came out, she was booked on the Today show. She left Doctors Hospital after a blood transfusion, did the show, walked around the corner, got into an ambulance and went back to the hospital."

Susann was candid about the theme of the book, stating that it was one of "mental and spiritual incest." After her death, film critic Andrew Sarris pointed out, "If there is any single key to the oeuvre of Jacqueline Susann, it is to be found in an extended Electra complex."

Susann dedicated the book to her father, Robert Susann (1887–1957), and her husband.

== Reception ==
The book, published by William Morrow on March 20, 1973, met with largely negative reviews, as was typical for a Susann novel. A writer for The New York Times complained that the book had "nearly 500 steadily monotonous pages," populated by "a cast of obscure, unpleasant, implausible, stupid or sly characters [who] lurk in the mind for weeks only because one wants to meet and kick them." However, two of the book industry's most respected trade magazines—Library Journal and Publishers Weekly—gave the book positive reviews. Library Journal said, "Spectacularly successful. There are plane crashes, drug orgies, motorcycle accidents, mass rapes, attempted abortions, suicide, evil doctors and assorted other activities, and I couldn't put the damned thing down." Publishers Weekly said, "Our girl has done it again. There is no place for this sensational novel to go but straight up the best seller list." Which it did. Sales were enormous: the book spent 36 weeks on The New York Times Best Seller List, eight of those weeks at #1. It became the second highest-selling novel in 1973, behind only Jonathan Livingston Seagull by Richard Bach.

== Film adaptation ==
In 1975, Paramount Pictures released a film adaptation, Once Is Not Enough, directed by Guy Green and written by Julius J. Epstein (Casablanca). The film starred Kirk Douglas as Mike Wayne, Alexis Smith (in her first film since 1959) as Deirdre Milford Granger, Melina Mercouri as Karla, and Deborah Raffin as January. It was produced by Howard W. Koch and executive-produced by Susann's husband, Irving Mansfield. The musical score was composed by Henry Mancini.

The film received negative reviews; Vincent Canby, in The New York Times, offered a multiple-choice "audience participation" review, in which the reader was given four choices (ludicrous, bad, terrible, horrendous) to evaluate the movie.

Despite the reviews, the film was a commercial success, earning $15.7 million at the box office. Brenda Vaccaro, as Linda Riggs, received an Oscar nomination for her performance. Vaccaro won the Golden Globe award for Best Supporting Actress in a Motion Picture for her role in the film.
