= The Love Machine (film) =

1971 film by Jack Haley Jr.

- Theatrical release poster by Howard Terpning
- Directed by: Jack Haley Jr.
- Screenplay by: Samuel Taylor
- Based on: The Love Machine by Jacqueline Susann
- Produced by: M. J. Frankovich
- Starring: Dyan Cannon; Robert Ryan; Jackie Cooper; David Hemmings; William Roerick; Maureen Arthur; Shecky Greene; Clinton Greyn; Sharon Farrell; Jodi Wexler; John Phillip Law
- Cinematography: Charles B. Lang
- Edited by: David Blewitt
- Music by: Artie Butler
- Production companies: Sujac Productions; Frankovich Productions
- Distributed by: Columbia Pictures
- Release dates: August 5, 1971 (New York City); August 27, 1971 (United States)
- Running time: 109 minutes
- Country: United States
- Language: English
- Budget: $5 million

The Love Machine is a 1971 American drama film directed by Jack Haley Jr. from a screenplay by Samuel Taylor, based on the 1969 novel of the same name by Jacqueline Susann. It stars Dyan Cannon, Robert Ryan, Jackie Cooper, David Hemmings, William Roerick, Maureen Arthur, Shecky Greene, Clinton Greyn, Sharon Farrell, Jodi Wexler, and John Phillip Law.

== Plot ==
Robin Stone, a handsome, ambitious newsman for a New York television station, attracts the attention of Judith Austin, wife of Gregory Austin, the head of the IBC network. Concerned about ratings, Greg is encouraged by Judith to hire Robin as IBC's new anchorman. Although he opposes Greg's decision, Danton Miller, the head of programming, is unable to overrule his boss. Soon afterward, feeling threatened by Greg's support of Robin's plan to take his newscast to prime-time, Dan decides to build a variety show around second-rate comedian Christie Lane to prove that the audience prefers crass entertainment to more cerebral programming.

Christie is a hit in the ratings, and Jerry Nelson, a homosexual friend of Robin, arranges for the show's sponsor to hire Amanda, a fashion model and Robin's occasional girlfriend, as the on-air representative of its product. After her first spot airs, Amanda skips a celebratory party and goes to Robin. Shattered when she finds Robin with a nude woman, she attends the party alone. Christie Lane, smitten with Amanda, proposes marriage when a drunken Amanda agrees to go home with him.

Judith persuades Robin to have lunch with her, but they end up in bed instead. During their rendezvous, Greg suffers a severe heart attack. Judith, who holds Greg's power of attorney, appoints Robin to act as head of the network while she takes her husband to Switzerland to recuperate.

Soon afterward, having rejected Amanda yet again, Robin is shaken by the news of Amanda's suicide. He goes out for a walk. Propositioned by a prostitute, he accompanies her to his room, but then changes his mind, and beats up the hooker. He then confesses to Jerry, who agrees to provide an alibi for Robin. In return, Jerry asks for a slave bracelet engraved with Robin's name.

Judith returns to New York with Greg, now recovered. When Robin refuses to resume their affair, Judith convinces her husband to reclaim control of the network, thereby demoting Robin. In response, Robin threatens to quit entirely, a move which would result in problems between Greg and the shareholders.

When Robin visits Los Angeles, Jerry persuades him to attend a party at the home of the actor Alfie Knight, Jerry's new boyfriend. Robin, in turn, invites Judith who is also in the city. At the party, Robin is pleased to see aspiring actress Maggie Stewart, who rebuffs him. Judith, meanwhile, becomes annoyed when Robin neglects her for Jerry and Alfie.

After most of the guests have gone, Judith, still angry, finds Jerry's slave bracelet on the floor. Reading the inscription, she threatens to expose Robin. Jerry and Alfie try to retrieve the bracelet, which leads to a brawl. Soon the police arrive, and Robin explains the fight by claiming that he had instigated it by making a drunken pass at Judith. Later, as Robin leaves the police station, his reputation in ruins, Maggie Stewart pulls up in her car and asks him if he needs a ride. He declines.

== Cast ==
- John Phillip Law as Robin Stone
- Dyan Cannon as Judith Austin
- Robert Ryan as Gregory 'Greg' Austin
- Jackie Cooper as Danton Miller
- David Hemmings as Jerry Nelson
- Jodi Wexler as Amanda
- William Roerick as Cliff Dorne
- Maureen Arthur as Ethel Evans
- Shecky Greene as Christie Lane
- Clinton Greyn as Alfie Knight
- Sharon Farrell as Maggie Stewart
- Alexandra Hay as Tina St. Claire
- Eve Bruce as Amazon Woman
- Greg Mullavey as Bob Summers
- Gene Baylos as Eddie Flynn
- Ben Lessy as Kenny Ditto
- Edith Atwater as Mary
- Elizabeth St. Clair as Susie
- Claudia Jennings as Darlene
- Mary Collinson as Debbie
- Madeleine Collinson as Sandy
- Jerry Dunphy as Newscaster
- Michael Jackson as Newscaster
- Ted Meyer as Newscaster

== Production ==
Jacqueline Susann received $1.5 million (equivalent to $12.4 million in 2025) for the film rights to her best-selling book, a record sum for the time. She has a brief cameo in the film as a television newscaster.

Just prior to the start of filming, actor Brian Kelly, who had been cast as Robin Stone, was involved in a near-fatal motorcycle accident. He was replaced by John Phillip Law. Although significantly taller than Kelly, Law was compelled to wear costumes which had been designed for Kelly, with the result that the ill-fitting clothes are apparent in the finished film.

The campy scene where Judith gets in a fight with Jerry and his boyfriend was a case of art imitating life for Dyan Cannon, who had had a backstage quarrel with gay co-star Dick Kallman while doing the play How to Succeed in Business Without Really Trying. During one of their matches, Kallman slammed a door on her hand. She still has the scar on her finger.

== Release ==
The film opened August 6, 1971 at the Loew's State 2 and Loew's Orpheum theaters in New York City with 450 prints released around the United States by August 27.

== Reception ==
Reviews of the film were mostly negative. Chicago Sun-Times film critic Roger Ebert wrote:

John Phillip Law is pretty bored in The Love Machine. He plays an artifact only slightly more animated than the monoliths in 2001: A Space Odyssey and symbolizing a great deal less. He is surrounded by a galaxy (or perhaps gallery is the word) of Hollywood character actors who seem as desperate as he is, and the final effect is of Search for Tomorrow on downers.

My notion is that you've either got to handle this material all-out or avoid it. There's nothing more disgusting than vulgarity done as if it were in good taste. It's hypocritical and it's dirty. When you give junk like this an expensive production, with two Dionne Warwick songs and only four glimpses of the sound boom, you're missing the elementary kind of vitality it could have had.

The film is listed in Golden Raspberry Award founder John Wilson's book The Official Razzie Movie Guide as one of the 100 Most Enjoyably Bad Movies Ever Made.
