= Tobruk (1967 film) =

1967 American war film directed by Arthur Hiller

- film poster by Frank McCarthy
- Directed by: Arthur Hiller
- Written by: Leo V. Gordon
- Produced by: Gene Corman
- Starring: Rock Hudson; George Peppard; Guy Stockwell; Nigel Green
- Cinematography: Russell Harlan
- Edited by: Robert C. Jones
- Music by: Bronisław Kaper
- Color process: Technicolor
- Production companies: Gibraltar Productions; The Corman Company
- Distributed by: Universal Pictures
- Release dates: February 7, 1967 (Chicago, Illinois)
- Running time: 109 minutes
- Country: United States
- Language: English
- Budget: $6 million
- Box office: $2,000,000 (US/Canada)

Tobruk is a 1967 American drama war film directed by Arthur Hiller and starring Rock Hudson and George Peppard. The film was written by Leo Gordon (who also acted in the film) and released through Universal Pictures.

Set in North Africa during the North African Campaign of World War II. It is a fictionalized story of members of the British Army's Long Range Desert Group (LRDG) and the Special Interrogation Group (SIG) that endeavour to destroy the fuel bunkers of Generalfeldmarschall Erwin Rommel's Panzer Army Africa in Tobruk. The film is loosely based on the British attacks on Italian and German forces at Tobruk codenamed "Operation Agreement". The film depicts the operation as being successful, even though actually Operation Agreement was a disastrous failure.

== Plot ==
In September 1942, Rommel's Afrika Korps is only 90 miles (144 km) from the Suez Canal, but running dangerously low on fuel. The British approve a plan to destroy German fuel bunkers at Tobruk in an attempt to cripple Rommel's attack.

The author of the plan, Canadian-born Major Donald Craig of the Long Range Desert Group (LRDG) is a prisoner of Vichy French forces held prisoner with captured Italian soldiers on a ship in the French port of Algiers. Craig is rescued by a group of German Jews of the Special Identification Group (SIG) led by Captain Kurt Bergman. They rendezvous with commandos of the Long Range Desert Group, under the command of Lieutenant-Colonel John Harker, at Kufra in southeastern Libya. They have eight days to destroy the fuel depot at Tobruk and the artillery protecting the harbour, before a scheduled amphibious landing and RAF bombing raid. Their infiltration plan is to pose as prisoners of war escorted by the SIG disguised as German guards. Craig is skeptical of the plan feeling they've waited too long and left the Germans time to create a strong defence. Harker warns Craig not to let personal differences of opinion interfere with the operation, revealing the revised plan is his.

The group encounters a patrol of Italian tanks near a rest stop in a gully. Sergeant Major Jack Tyne spots a German tank column approaching from the opposite direction and they trick the two units into engaging each other, permitted their escape. Craig safely guides them through a German mine field, before they are attacked by a British Curtiss P-40 Warhawk fighter. They shoot it down after losing eight men are killed, a one troop transport truck, their auxiliary fuel supply, and both of their radios. Harker orders a burial party, and the fighting and smoke from the burning truck and plane attracts Tuareg tribesmen who are friendly with the Germans. Craig parleys in their language and exchanges guns and ammunition for two prisoners: British traitors Henry Portman and his daughter Cheryl who were shot down while flying from Benghazi to Cairo. They carry papers signed by the Grand Mufti of Jerusalem and German Field Marshal Albert Kesselring: an agreement for Egyptian army officers to rise up against the British in a "holy war" and a stated belief that conquering Egypt will bring other Muslim states into the Axis.

The Portmans are told by a mysterious SIG member about the British masquerade. They take a gun and map to an underground telephone cable to contact the Germans in Tobruk and alert them of the upcoming British attack. When they're intercepted by an Italian patrol, Henry is killed and his daughter seriously wounded.

Bergman and Sergeant Krug retrieve Cheryl from the Italians, who reveals one of the SIG members is a traitor. Harker gives Bergman two hours to investigate, and the traitor kills Cheryl to protect his identity. Lieutenant Max Mohnfeld, Bergman's second in command, investigates the tunnel the Portmans used to escape, and finds the body of Corporal Bruckner, one of Bergman's closest friends. Cheryl's death from cyanide, and Bruckner's missing suicide tablet, fail to convince Bergman his friend was the traitor.

The group penetrates into Tobruk where Rommel has amassed two full panzer divisions undetected, placing the amphibious assault in jeopardy. Without radios, they are unable to report the situation and the RAF bomb Tobruk as scheduled. The LRDG blow up two of the harbour guns, Harker orders Sergeant Major Tyne to signal the ships to abort the landing, and sends Lieutenant Boyden (Anthony Ashdown) to capture the German transmitter. Boyden is killed in the bombing and Privates Alfie and Dolan are shot when they are caught trying to steal captured English pound notes.

Bergman and three men are killed while creating a diversion for Harker, allowing Craig and Krug to escape with two SIG men. They seize a German tank and destroy the fuel depot with it.

Harker and his men surrender and Mohnfeld reveals he is really a German intelligence officer named von Kruger, admitting Bruckern had found him in the tunnel. Asking Harker for the Kesselring document, Harker tells him he burned it before capture then draws his pistol and kills von Kruger. The German guards kill him in return. Craig, Krug and their two companions travel over 70 miles down the coast on foot and arrive at the alternate rendezvous with a Royal Navy ship at Sallum just over the Egyptian border.

== Cast ==
In order of appearance

- Rock Hudson as Major Donald Craig
- George Peppard as Captain Kurt Bergman
- Robert Wolders as Corporal Bruckner
- Anthony Ashdown as Lieutenant Boyden
- Nigel Green as Lieutenant-Colonel John Harker
- Norman Rossington as Private Alfie Braithwaite
- Percy Herbert as Private Dolan
- Jack Watson as Sergeant Major Jack Tyne
- Leo Gordon as Sergeant Krug
- Guy Stockwell as Lieutenant Max Mohnfeld / Von Kruger
- Peter Coe as Tuareg Chieftain
- Liam Redmond as Henry Portman
- Heidy Hunt as Cheryl Portman
- Rico Cattani as Corporal Stuhler
- Lawrence Montaigne as Italian Officer
- Curt Lowens as German Colonel
- Bob Hoy as British Corporal
- Phil Adams as S.I.G. Bicker
- Ronnie Rondall Jr. as S.I.G. Schell

== Production ==
=== Development ===
The film was based on an original script by Leo Gordon, who also worked as an actor. Gordon took the script to producer Gene Corman, whom he had worked with several times before. Corman originally intended to make the film on a relatively low budget, around a million dollars, for United Artists – he had just made The Secret Invasion (1964) for that studio.

The scope of the film changed when Corman discovered Rock Hudson, then one of the biggest stars in the world, was about to leave his home studio of Universal because he was unhappy with the roles he had been playing (he had just signed to make Seconds at Paramount). Corman showed the script to Hudson who liked it, and he succeeded in getting the film financed at Universal, who wanted to keep Hudson within its fold. The film was a co production between Universal, Gibraltar Productions (Rock Hudson's company), and the Corman Co.

The film was known at one stage as The Cliffs at Mersa and The Cliffs. Hudson came on board in May 1965 (he would make it after Blindfold and Seconds) and Peppard was signed to co star with Hudson in July 1965, at a fee of $400,000.

Laurence Harvey was originally slated to play the role of Major Craig, while Dirk Bogarde was originally offered the role of Colonel Harker, but he declined.

Corman approached John Huston to direct who was interested. However, he wanted a fee of $500,000 and Universal was reluctant to use the director considering his recent films had been commercial failures. The job of directing eventually went to Arthur Hiller.

Corman budgeted the film at two-and-a-half million dollars. Universal felt it should be made for $5 million, but Corman was reluctant to make the movie for that much. His own fee was $200,000 while Gordon was paid $40,000 for his script. Corman wanted to shoot the film in North Africa with studio work done in England; however, Universal insisted it be shot in America as the studio was reluctant to film in Europe again after A Man Could Get Killed (also known as Welcome Mr. Beddoes) went over budget.

Gordon wrote himself a role as Sgt Tyne. Gordon normally played characters who died and wrote the script so Tyne did not die. Corman agreed to Gordon playing a role but only if the script was changed so Tyne died. Gordon instead decided to play the character of Krug, who lived.

Corman later commentated that Gordon "was a very witty, interesting conversationalist. His appearance probably worked to his disadvantage because to have him walk into a story conference was somewhat intimidating! I remember on Tobruk having director Arthur Hiller, who is a fey, gentle soul, taken aback when he met Leo – it took two or three story conferences before he could come to grips with that size and bulk."

=== Shooting ===
It was photographed in Technicolor using the Techniscope format, and shot in Almería, Spain and the Glamis Sand Dunes in the Imperial Valley, of southern California in the United States. The film had a budget of US$6 million.

Technical advice and assistance was provided by the 40th Armored Division ("Grizzly") of the California Army National Guard.

In the convoy heading to Tobruk the trucks used are actually M135 and M54, while the Sd.Kfz. 7's are American M3 halftracks with altered bodies. The tanks in the Italian column are in fact M48 Pattons.

Producer Gene Corman would again use Tobruk's Nazi occupation as the background in his 1990 parody film A Man Called Sarge, although this time set during the Second Battle of El Alamein, in late 1942.

== Reception ==
Filmink argued "there's annoyingly no mention of Australians."

== Use of footage ==
The 1971 war film Raid on Rommel, directed by Henry Hathaway and starring Richard Burton, made extensive use of combat footage from Tobruk and also featured a very similar story-line about a British commando force infiltrating enemy lines and raiding the Afrika Korps supply bases.

== Academy Awards ==
Albert Whitlock and Howard A. Anderson were nominated for the Academy Award for Best Visual Effects.

== Home media ==
Universal first released this film on VHS on April 23, 1992, and again on May 15, 2002, in pan-and-scan format. It was released on DVD on June 12, 2012, as part of the made-on-demand Universal Vault Series. On January 21, 2020, Tobruk was released on Blu-ray by Kino International under its subsidiary "Kino Lorber Studio Classics" with licensing by Universal Pictures.

The R1 DVD release has no optional English subtitles and thus, the non-English dialogue in the film is not translated. The Blu-ray contains optional English subtitles with limited non-English ones during certain scenes and dialogue; the film's theatrical trailer is also included as a bonus feature (in pan-and-scan format).

There are also various Region 2 DVD and Region B Blu-ray releases.

== Comics adaptation ==
Oliver Passingham adapted the film into a comic book version, published by the Lion Summer Spectacular.

== See also ==
- List of American films of 1967
- The Desert Rats (film) (1953 film)
- Raid on Rommel (1971 film)
- Tobruk (2008 film) (2008 film)

== Notes ==
- Mayersberg, Paul (1967). Hollywood, the haunted house. Allen Lane, Penguin P.
