= Danielle De Metz =

French actress (born 1938)

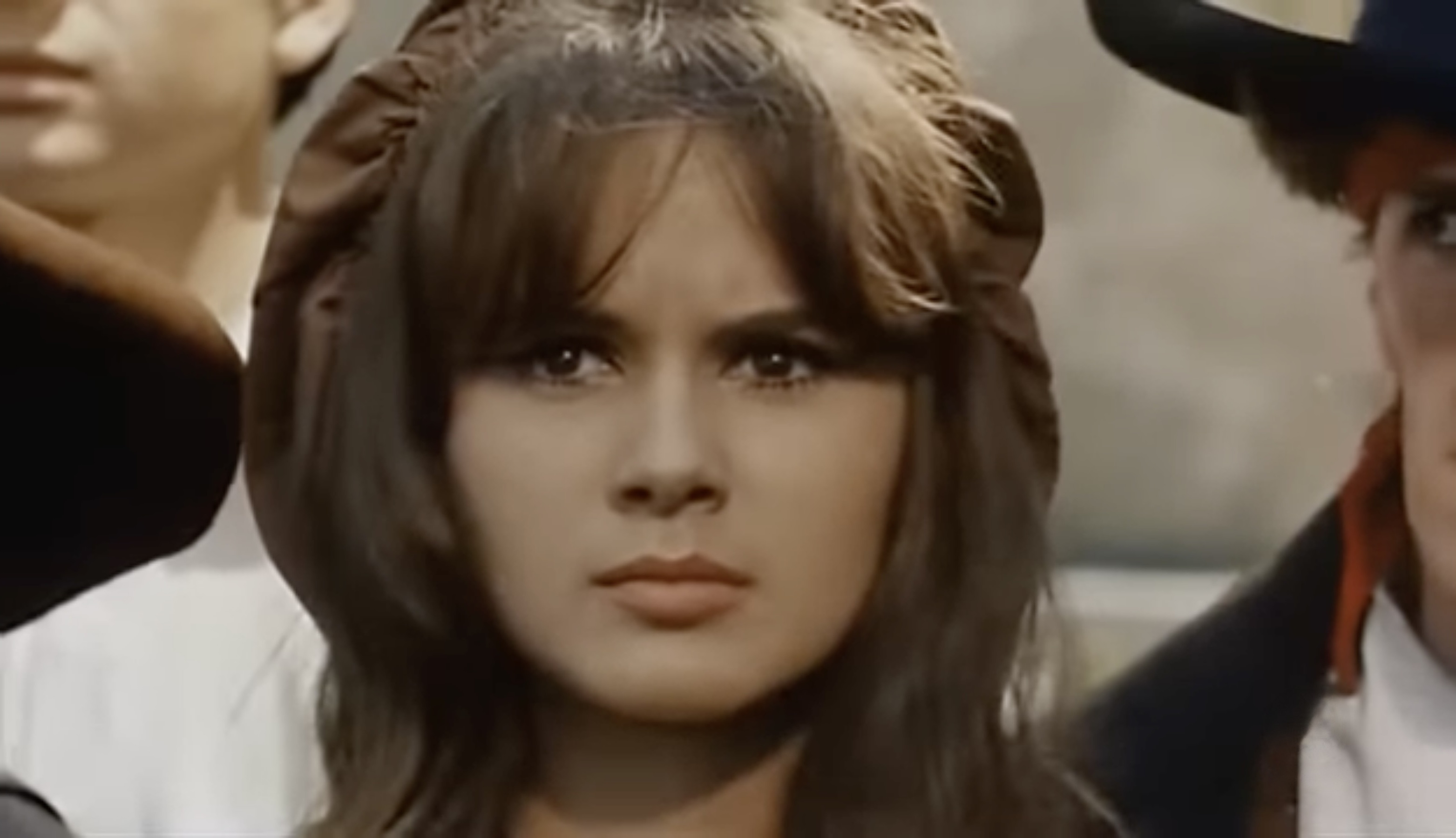
- De Metz in Odio mortale (1962)
- Born: 27 July 1938 (age 88); Paris, France
- Occupation: Actress
- Years active: 1959–1972
- Spouses: George De Metz (m. 1956; div. 1961) Alan Sher (m. 1962; div. 1971) Samuel Kupper (m. 1972; div. 1984)
- Children: 1

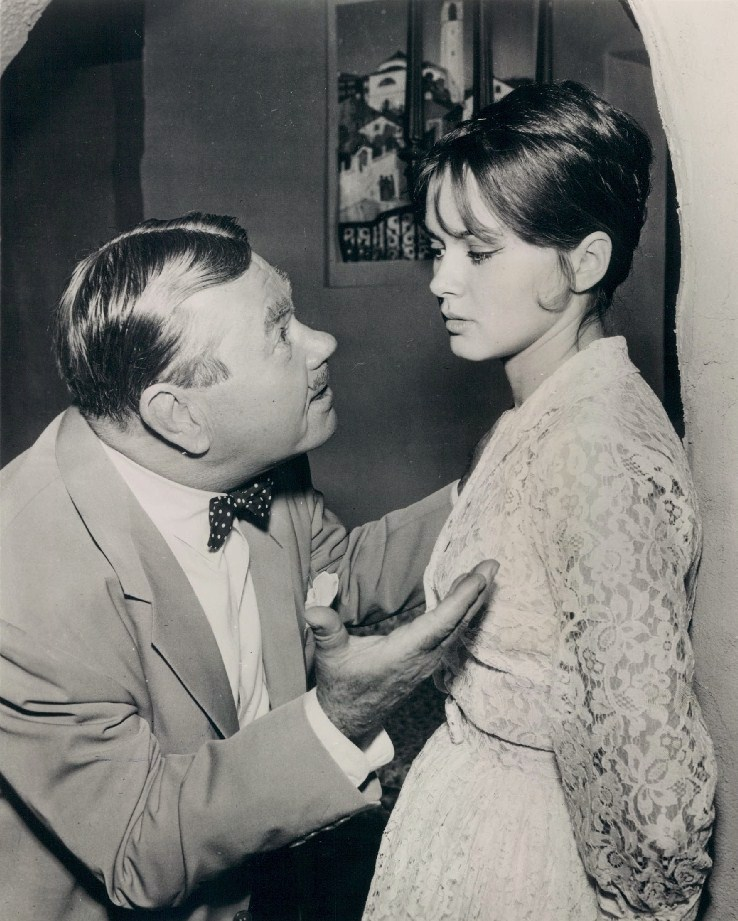
Oskar Homolka and Danielle De Metz in "The Ikon of Elijah", an episode of Alfred Hitchcock Presents (1960)

Danielle De Metz (born 27 July 1938) is a French actress who appeared in movies and television during the 1960s and early 1970s.

== Career ==
Movie columnist Louella Parsons reported that film director Jean Negulesco met De Metz when he was in Paris, France, and told her to contact him if she came to Hollywood, California. When she came and called him, he had no role available, so he put her in school at 20th Century Fox.

De Metz guest starred in such shows as Dr. Kildare, The Man from U.N.C.L.E., The Girl from U.N.C.L.E., The Many Loves of Dobie Gillis, The Tab Hunter Show, My Three Sons, I Dream of Jeannie, 77 Sunset Strip, Combat!, Lock-Up, Perry Mason, I Spy, Voyage to the Bottom of the Sea, Boris Karloff Presents, Alfred Hitchcock Presents and Have Gun - Will Travel. Her film work includes Return of the Fly (1959), Valley of the Dragons (1961), The Magic Sword (1962), Gidget Goes to Rome (1963), The Party (1968), and Raid on Rommel (1971).

== Personal life ==
De Metz married George De Metz in Paris in 1956. They divorced January 23, 1961, in Los Angeles, California She married Alan "Lanny" Sher in March 1962. Divorced Sher in 1969. De Metz married Samuel Y. Kupper in 1972.

== Filmography ==
- Return of the Fly (1959) as Cecile Bonnard
- La ragazza di mille mesi (1961) as Didi
- Valley of the Dragons (1961) as Nateeta
- Jessica (1962) as Nicolina Lombardo
- The Magic Sword (1962) as Mignonette
- The Black Invaders (1962)
- Duel at the Rio Grande (1963) as Manuela
- Gidget Goes to Rome (1963) as Daniela
- The Scorpio Letters (1967) as Marie
- The Party (1968) as Stella D'Angelo
- Wake Me When the War Is Over as Eva Klein
- Raid on Rommel (1971) as Vivi

== Television ==
- Alfred Hitchcock Presents (1960) (Season 5 Episode 16: "The Ikon of Elijah") as Malvira
- Thriller (1961) as Babette
- Perry Mason (1966)(Season9, Episode 25: "The Case of the Unwelcome Well")as Monique Martin
- Combat! (1963, Season 2 Ep. 15 The Party) as Angelique
