= Raid on Rommel =

1971 film by Henry Hathaway

- Directed by: Henry Hathaway
- Written by: Richard M. Bluel
- Produced by: Harry Tatelman
- Starring: Richard Burton; John Colicos; Clinton Greyn; Wolfgang Preiss; Danielle De Metz
- Cinematography: Earl Rath
- Edited by: Gene Palmer
- Music by: Hal Mooney
- Distributed by: Universal Pictures
- Release date: February 12, 1971
- Running time: 98 minutes
- Country: United States
- Language: English

Raid on Rommel is a 1971 American war film directed by Henry Hathaway and starring Richard Burton, John Colicos, Clinton Greyn, Danielle De Metz and Wolfgang Preiss. The film centers on a British commando attempting to destroy German gun emplacements in Tobruk.

Originally intended as a made-for-television film, Raid on Rommel extensively reuses action footage from 1967's Tobruk, and the storyline is also largely the same. The film was released by Universal Pictures on February 12, 1971, and was both a critical and commercial failure.

== Plot ==
In Libya in 1942, Captain Alex Foster, an intelligence officer with the British Army, allows himself to be captured by a German Afrika Korps convoy transporting British prisoners, pretending to be injured. Once integrated with the prisoners, consisting of a medical unit and remnants of a commando force, Foster outlines his plans to take over the convoy, with the help of the prisoners, and redirect it towards the Libyan port town of Tobruk.

On the way, they find an unexpected concentration of German tanks, and they surmise that a fuel depot must be hidden nearby. Foster, in Afrika Corps uniform, and Major Tarkington, the medical officer as his 'prisoner', gain access to the depot and meet Field Marshal Erwin Rommel. During a friendly dispute over philately between Rommel and Tarkington, Foster notices a map which indicates the location of the fuel depot.

They make excuses, leave, capture a tank, and blow up the fuel dump. They escape towards Tobruk, where they destroy a coastal battery. The prisoners are embarked in boats launched by attacking Royal Navy warships. However, Foster and Tarkington are captured by German soldiers. The film leaves their fates unexplained.

The only female character in the film, Vivianne, is a woman previously attached to an Italian general. Vivianne is held against her will because of her presence on the official letters of transport for the convoy. She is drugged and eventually abandoned at the side of the road before the final battle in Tobruk.

== Cast ==
- Richard Burton as Capt. Alex Foster
- John Colicos as Sgt. Allan MacKenzie
- Clinton Greyn as Maj. Hugh Tarkington
- Wolfgang Preiss as Erwin Rommel
- Danielle de Metz as Vivianne Gagliardo
- Karl-Otto Alberty as Capt. Heinz Schroeder
- Christopher Cary as Cpl. Peter Merrihew
- John Orchard as Dan Garth
- Brook Williams as Sgt. Joe Reilly
- Greg Mullavey as Pte. Ed Brown
- Ben Wright as Admiral
- Michael Sevareid as Cpl. Bill Wembley
- Chris Anders as Tank Sergeant

== Production ==
The film was originally intended as an NBC made-for-television film. The producers wanted to reuse the expensive action and special-effects footage from Tobruk (1967), which had not been a success, and intended to cast Robert Stack in the lead role. During pre-production, plans shifted and it was decided to retool the film into a theatrical picture, albeit a relatively cheap one. Stack was replaced by Richard Burton for added marquee value, but indicative of the low budget, was the only major star in the film.

Henry Hathaway says he did the film because "it looked like it might be fun". He shot it in twenty days and says Richard Burton never drank during the shoot although Elizabeth Taylor, who joined him, did.

Filming took place over three weeks in San Felipe, Mexico. Belying the film's made-for-television origins, much of the crew were from Universal's television division. In order to match the reused footage from Tobruk, Richard Burton had to dye his hair blond (in order to match George Peppard in the earlier film).

== Reception ==
The film was poorly received by critics. It has a 32% rating on Rotten Tomatoes.

In 2006, the BBC's Radio Times wrote: "It says a lot for Richard Burton that he was able to plumb the depths in dreary Second World War action movies such as this one, about a British officer releasing prisoners to attack Tobruk, without doing any apparent damage to his career. Even the usually dependable director Henry Hathaway falters in this flawed effort that was originally meant for TV".

Just nine months after its theatrical release, the film made its television debut as an NBC Movie of the Week.

== See also ==
- List of American films of 1971
