= Once Is Not Enough (film) =

1975 American drama film directed by Guy Green

Jacqueline Susann's Once Is Not Enough
- Theatrical release poster
- Directed by: Guy Green
- Written by: Julius J. Epstein
- Based on: Once Is Not Enough by Jacqueline Susann
- Produced by: Howard W. Koch
- Starring: Kirk Douglas; Alexis Smith; David Janssen; George Hamilton; Melina Mercouri; Brenda Vaccaro; Deborah Raffin
- Cinematography: John A. Alonzo
- Music by: Henry Mancini
- Distributed by: Paramount Pictures
- Release date: June 18, 1975; (United States)
- Running time: 121 minutes
- Country: United States
- Language: English
- Box office: $15.7 million

Jacqueline Susann's Once Is Not Enough is a 1975 American romance film, directed by Guy Green, starring Kirk Douglas, Alexis Smith, David Janssen, George Hamilton, Brenda Vaccaro, Melina Mercouri, and Deborah Raffin. It was produced by Howard W. Koch and written by Julius J. Epstein, based on the 1973 novel of the same name by Jacqueline Susann.

It featured Alexis Smith's return to the big screen after an absence of 16 years, and Brenda Vaccaro was nominated for the Academy Award for Best Supporting Actress and won the Golden Globe award for her role as Linda Riggs. Composer Henry Mancini's title song was shortlisted by the Academy Awards for Original Song, but did not receive a final nomination.

== Plot ==
Mike Wayne is a middle-aged motion-picture producer who can no longer get a Hollywood film made.

Accustomed to a lavish lifestyle, Mike has pampered his daughter, January, providing her with an expensive education in Europe and everything else money can buy. January worships her father and eagerly returns to America to be with him again.

Needing capital, Mike enters into a loveless marriage with Deidre Milford Granger, one of the world's wealthiest women. She has already been through multiple marriages and demands that things be done her way. She is also secretly carrying on a lesbian affair. January is devastated to learn that her father is now wed to this rude, arrogant woman.

Deidre attempts to draw January into a relationship with her cousin David Milford, a ladies' man who also usually gets his own way. He finally persuades January into going to bed with him, only to discover that she is a virgin.

Unsure what to do with her life, January is advised by an old friend, Linda Riggs, now a magazine editor, to write a book. Linda enjoys a free-spirited life with many lovers and urges January to do likewise. But due in no small part to her father complex, January instead falls for much older Tom Colt, a hard-drinking, impotent novelist who is an adversary of her father's.

Mike bitterly resents the affair. He punches Colt upon finding him with January in a Beverly Hills hotel cabin. Mike orders his daughter to make a choice between them and Colt gives her the same ultimatum. She chooses her lover.

Deidre's demands and insults finally become too much for Mike, who wants a divorce. They amicably agree to one but their airplane crashes and both are killed. The devastated January turns to Tom Colt for comfort, but he turns against her, leaving her to go on alone.

January learns that she has inherited $3 million from her father's insurance policy to begin a new life for herself. When she goes to tell the good news to Linda, she finds her angry and distraught, having just been fired for having sex with her boss. Realizing that nothing is perfect in life, not even in its own way, January is left alone wandering Manhattan after dark but with hope that tomorrow will be a better day. The ending was made more hopeful than in the source novel. The novel ends with January trying acid and partaking in an orgy. She then wanders onto the beach where she hallucinates that she sees her father and walks into the ocean after him, presumably drowning.

== Cast ==
- Kirk Douglas as Mike Wayne
- Alexis Smith as Deidre Milford Granger
- David Janssen as Tom Colt
- George Hamilton as David Milford
- Melina Mercouri as Karla
- Gary Conway as Hugh Richardson
- Brenda Vaccaro as Linda Riggs
- Deborah Raffin as January Wayne
- Leonard Sachs as Dr. Peterson
- John Roper as Franco
- Phil Foster as Cab Driver
- Lillian Randolph as Mabel

== Production ==
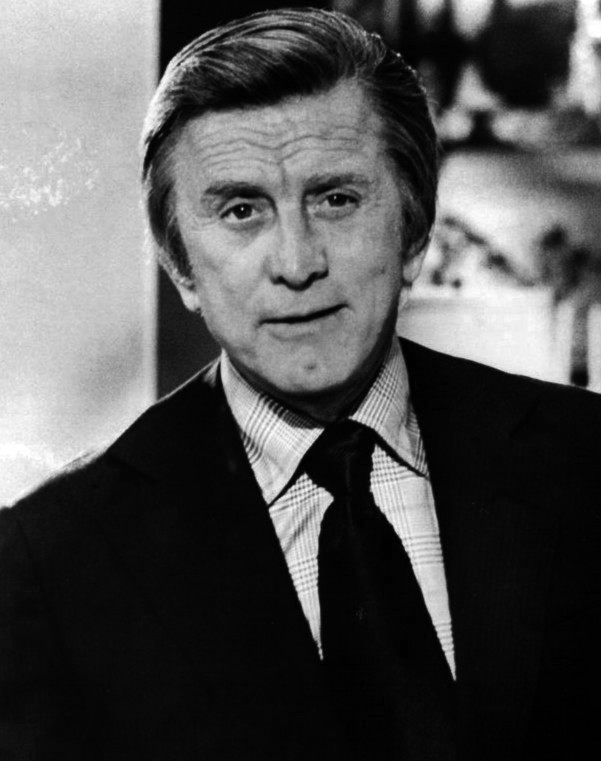
Kirk Douglas

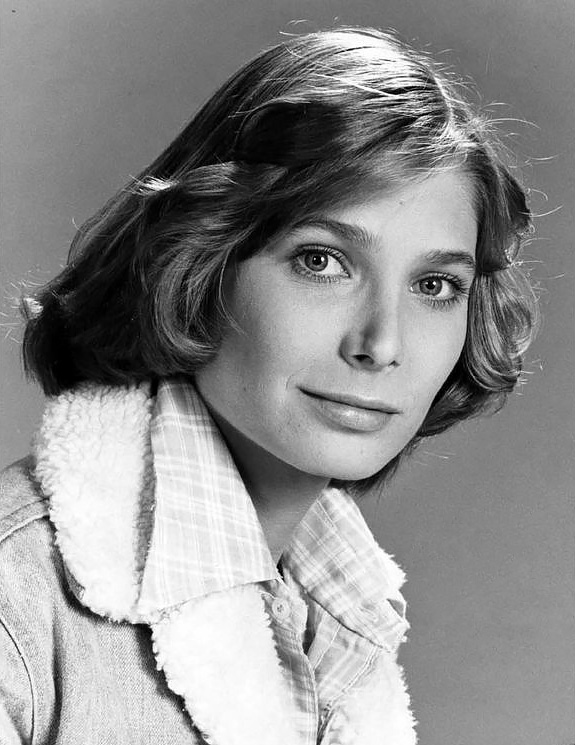
Deborah Raffin

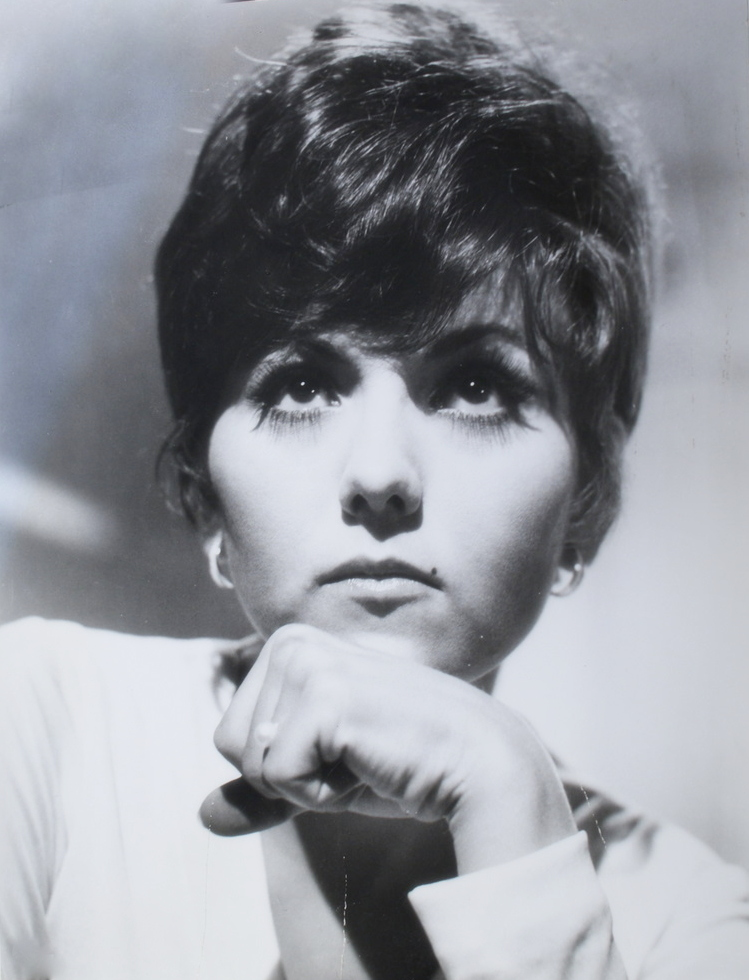
Brenda Vaccaro

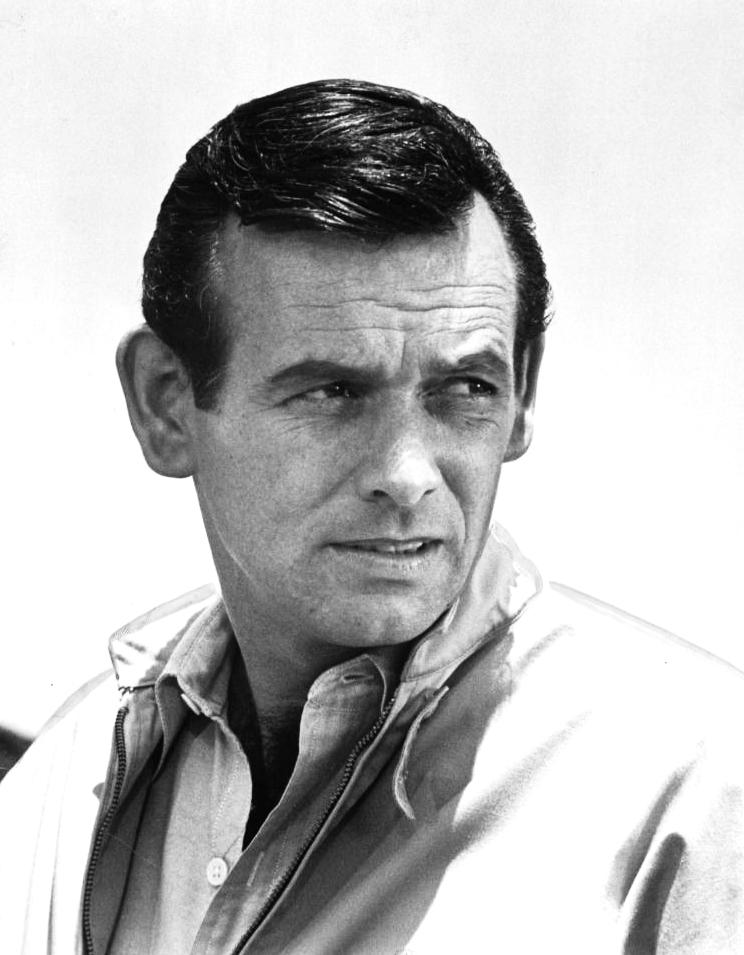
David Janssen

Guy Green was hired to direct the film, according to one Paramount executive, because he "might give it class". Green wanted Dick Van Dyke to play the role of Mike Wayne. He also wanted to fire David Janssen during rehearsals and replace him with Robert Shaw. Irving Mansfield said Kirk Douglas and Janssen directed themselves during the film. Green said he did not get along with Susann and did not enjoy the experience. "I was lost ... going through the emotions," he said. "A sad experience."

The film was partly shot on location in New York City at various locations, including: P. J. Clarke's, the Whitney Museum, El Morocco, The Pierre hotel, the Plaza Hotel and Beekman Place. In a scene filmed at Central Park Zoo, Deborah Raffin and David Janssen are seen bicycling up to the llamas cage; where the script required the animals to nuzzle while the couple was present, but the llamas refused to cooperate, which prompted a member of the set to quip: "they're more trouble than Bette Davis."

If the film is entertaining, I'll have made my contribution. People go to the movies to forget their problems; if a statement is made as well, that's a by-product for whoever wants to pick it up.

— Kirk Douglas

Kirk Douglas said he accepted the part because the film "is a wonderful soap opera". He also said he liked the script, and since he had made so many "period pieces", it gave him "a chance to do a modern film again." He further opined, "people may wonder if I still know how to tie a tie".

When producer Howard Koch approached Deborah Raffin about the film project, she told him she would do the film, but objected to doing any nude scenes that were required in the movie, because she considered "the nudity to represent so much indulgent froth." Koch, on the other hand, "felt such detail was both positive and essential." When she was called in to test for the part, she was adamant, telling Koch, she would not do any kind of nudity, including having another actress stand in and double for her. According to Raffin, Kirk Douglas ostracized her on the set by calling her "frigid" because she protested against nudity in the film, to which Raffin responded; she wouldn't do "anything just to be in movies".

== Release ==
The film was released on June 18, 1975, and earned $15.7 million at the box office. In addition, the movie placed number twenty-three on the list, "Big Rental Films of 1975", with an end-of-1975 total rentals of $7.8 million. (Note: Variety Magazine's anniversary edition annual checklist on the big pictures of the year just ended as reflecting their domestic rentals in the United States and Canada, accruing to the distributors (not total receipts taken in at all the theatres).) The film had its cable premiere on HBO in August 1976.

== Reception ==
R.T. Allin wrote in Film International that the movie is "solid film entertainment, promising to be as appealing visually as it is in terms of the Jacqueline Susann fantasied script; director Guy Green's newest gem dazzles the eye with every frame." Gerald Forshey said in his review for The Christian Century that this movie "is actually the best of the adaptations of the Susann novels; instead of breaking up the storyline into segments for several major characters, director Green keeps Deborah Raffin on the screen for more than 80 per cent of the scenes." He went on to say that "Alexis Smith and Melina Mercouri have decayed with age, and they show it on the screen; but the striking Deborah Raffin looks like a model on the cover of Seventeen."

Film critic Jay Cocks opined that "there is something exhilarating about inadvertent comedy; few things are as bracing as the spectacle of a lot of people spending good money trying to be serious and making fools of themselves; by these standards, this movie is an accidentally entertaining piece of work; as for the actors, they are all worthy of every moment of this film, which is both the most and least that can be said of them." British film critic Richard Dyer opined that "the lesbian relationship is the most positive and warm one in the film."

In a satirical review for The New York Times, film critic Vincent Canby put forward what he called "the world's first audience participation film review", where he asked questions with multiple choice answers. Among the snarky questions he asked were: "the movie seems to have been composed of (whole cloth, snips-and-snails-and-puppy-dogs-tails, press releases"); another question he proposed was; "it is (ludicrous, bad, terribe, horrendous"); plus the final question; "it's a film that seems to have been made (to warn motorcyclists not to drive fast, under a hair dryer, to make money look boring, to make money, all four").

Australian film critic Doug Anderson wrote in the Sydney Morning Herald "this is an immaculately stupid slab of jet-set intrigue and pulp novel glamour; Brenda Vaccaro shines among a cast of ghastlies; Melina Mercouri, who should have known far better, also appears; the book was eminently put-downable, the flick is equally eligible for a touch of the remote — Once is once too often."

== Accolades ==
Brenda Vaccaro was nominated for the Academy Award for Best Supporting Actress and won the Golden Globe Award for Best Supporting Actress in a motion picture for her role as Linda Riggs.

== See also ==
- Cinema of the United States
- List of American films of 1975
- List of LGBTQ-related films of 1975
- List of feature films with lesbian characters
