= Clinton Greyn =

British actor (1933–2019)

- Born: Clinton Stuart Greyn Thomas; 29 September 1933; Swansea, Wales
- Died: 19 March 2019 (aged 85)
- Years active: 1961-1989

Clinton Greyn (29 September 1933 – 19 March 2019) was a Welsh-born actor noted for his appearances in British television series of the 1960s and 1970s.

After graduating from RADA in 1957, Greyn worked in rep at Ipswich, Chesterfield and the Belgrade Theatre Coventry. He made his film debut in the 1961 Scotland Yard short Wings of Death, before going on to appear in such popular British TV series as Z-Cars and Compact. He also appeared in an uncredited role as the man in the punt in From Russia with Love (1963), although the part has been widely mis-credited to Michael Culver.

By 1967 his career had progressed to prominent roles opposite Shirley MacLaine in Vittorio De Sica's Woman Times Seven (1967), Stanley Baker in Peter Yates’s crime caper Robbery (1967), and Peter O'Toole in Herbert Ross's musical remake of Goodbye, Mr. Chips (1969). This led to him getting his own TV series in 1968, Virgin of the Secret Service, in which he played the dashing Captain Robert Virgin, travelling the world battling evil in the name of the British Empire. The series was not a success and he found himself making guest appearances in other adventure series, such as The Champions; Department S; and UFO ("The Dalotek Affair", 1971).

In the early 1970s he moved to Hollywood where he appeared in a number of films, including Raid on Rommel, The Love Machine, Swedish Fly Girls, and How to Steal an Airplane (all 1971). Returning to Britain he appeared in the action thriller Penny Gold (1973), and continued to guest-star in popular television series of the period such as Jason King, The Protectors, The Zoo Gang and Doctor Who.

Later in life he concentrated on the stage, appearing at the National Theatre as Nobel prize-winning Danish physicist Niels Bohr in Michael Frayn's Copenhagen in 2000.

Besides his acting career, Greyn studied architecture and design at the Open University and City University, London. He collaborated with Australian architect Russell Jones to build his dream home on a former bomb site in Bayswater, London.

Survivors include his first wife and their son, four grandchildren, and his second wife.

== Filmography ==
Year	Title	Role	Notes
1960	Exodus	Officer	uncredited
1964	The High Bright Sun	Evans	uncredited
1967	Woman Times Seven	MacCormack	segment "Two Against One"
1967	Robbery	Jack	
1969	Goodbye, Mr. Chips	Bill Calbury	
1971	Raid on Rommel	Major Tarkington	
1971	The Love Machine	Alfie Knight	
1971	Swedish Fly Girls	Derek	AKA Christa
1973	Penny Gold	Van Der Meij	
