= Irving Mansfield =

American film producer and publicist (1908–1988)

- Born: Irving Mandelbaum; July 23, 1908; New York City, U.S.
- Died: August 25, 1988 (aged 80); New York City, U.S.
- Occupations: Producer, publicist, writer
- Spouse: Jacqueline Susann (m. 1939; died 1974) Beverly Robinson (m. 1983)
- Children: 1

Irving Mansfield (July 23, 1908 – August 25, 1988) was an American producer, publicist and writer, the husband of novelist Jacqueline Susann and promoter of Susann's popular books.

== Early life and career ==
After working in public relations for several years, Mansfield became a producer with CBS in 1946 and developed Arthur Godfrey's Talent Scouts, This Is Show Business, and The Jane Froman Show, among other programs.

Mansfield gave up his career to help his wife promote her book, Valley of the Dolls, which was published in 1966 and became the best-selling novel of the year. Mansfield continued to work with his wife in promoting her subsequent novels, The Love Machine (1969) and Once Is Not Enough (1973), both among the top three sellers of their respective years. Mansfield also executive-produced movie versions of his wife's novels The Love Machine (1971) and Jacqueline Susann's Once Is Not Enough (1975), as well as a 1981 television mini-series version of Valley.

== Personal life ==
Mansfield met Jacqueline Susann, then an aspiring stage actress, in the late 1930s while he was working as a press agent. Susann was impressed by his ability to place "items" about her in the theater and society pages of New York newspapers, and they were married on April 2, 1939. Susann gave birth to their only child, Guy Hildy Mansfield, on December 6, 1946. At the age of three, Guy was diagnosed as autistic.

In an interview with People magazine in 1983, Mansfield described his son and how he found out his son was autistic:

"He was the most delicious child in the world.... Then one day when he was 3½ he came out of the park screaming and only said one line the rest of his life." (One day Jackie had muttered, "Guy, when are you going to talk?" and was stunned when he blurted, "When I'm ready." He never spoke again.)

Despite persistent rumors of Susann's infidelity, the couple was devoted to each other, and remained married until Susann's death from cancer on September 21, 1974, at the age of 56. After her death, Mansfield alone promoted her novella Dolores (William Morrow, 1976) which became another huge best seller (according to Publishers Weekly, Dolores was the third best-selling novel of its year). In 1983, learning of an upcoming biography of Susann, Mansfield published his own book, Life with Jackie (Bantam), written with Jean Libman Block.

In 1983, he married Beverly Robinson, who survived him at his death.

== Description ==
Editor Michael Korda gave this description of Irving Mansfield, ".. talked and acted as if he were a character straight out of Guys and Dolls, and was comfortable only at places like Lindy's, the Stage Delicatessen, and Sardi's (although late in life he managed to settle into the West Coast equivalent: a bungalow and a cabana at the Beverly Hills Hotel and a table at the Polo Lounge).

== Death ==
Mansfield died on August 25, 1988, at his home in Manhattan after suffering a heart attack. He was 80. In addition to his second wife, he was survived by his son. His funeral service was held on August 28 at the Riverside Chapel in Manhattan.
