= This Is Show Business =

American TV variety series (1949–1956)

This Is Show Business is an American variety television program that was broadcast first on CBS and later on NBC beginning July 15, 1949, and ending September 11, 1956. It was CBS-TV's first regular series broadcast live from coast to coast. It was originally titled This Is Broadway.

== Early years ==
This Is Broadway debuted on May 11, 1949, on CBS radio, and on July 15, 1949, CBS began a simulcast of the show on its TV network. Irving Mansfield created and produced it and Byron Paul was the director. Like a variety show, it featured entertainment by performers (some established and some new). It also featured a panel whose regular members, Abe Burrows and George S. Kaufman, were joined by a different guest each week. Clifton Fadiman was the host. In addition to performing, artists were supposed to discuss with the panel any show-business-related problems that they had encountered. The discussion aspect sometimes provided difficult when the performers felt that they had no problems to discuss. Bern Bennett was the announcer, and Ray Bloch and his orchestra provided music, Beginning on July 8, 1949, the program moved from its original 9:30-10:30 p.m. Eastern Time Wednesdays slot to 9-10 p.m. E.T. on Fridays.

Changes came on October 6, 1949, as the Crosley corporation began sponsoring the show. The schedule also changed again, with the show alternating with Inside U.S.A. on Thursdays, 8:30-9 p.m. E.T. Crosley ended its sponsorship on March 26, 1950.

A review of This Is Broadway In Radio Best magazine's October 1949 issue said, "Here is a show that started slowly, but built. As of end of summer, it is one of the outstanding variety pieces on the radio side of the dial." It noted that earlier difficulties, primarily presenting guests who really had no problems with which they needed help, had been resolved.

In September 1951. This Is Show Business became CBS's first regular series to be broadcast live coast-to-coast.

== Kaufman's dismissal and return ==
On the December 21, 1952, episode, Kaufman commented, "Let's make this one program on which no one sings 'Silent Night'." Protesting listeners began calling CBS before the episode ended, and letters of complaint went to the sponsor, American Tobacco Company, and to CBS in the days that followed. CBS officials responded by asking Kaufman not to return for the three remaining episodes (all that were scheduled at that time). Sources close to the program said that several hundred complaints came in, some of which contained threats to boycott the sponsor if Kaufman did not leave.

Kaufman explained that his comment was anti-commercialism, rather than anti-religious, saying, "I was merely speaking out against the use and overuse of this Christmas carol in connection with the sale of commercial products." His dismissal resulted in other protests by people who opposed his being removed from the show, Among them was the Rev. Dr. Truman B. Douglass, chairman of the National Council of Churches' Broadcasting and Film Commission. In a letter to William S. Paley, chairman of the board of CBS, Douglass wrote that what Kaufman said was "more expressive of religious sensitiveness than of any spirit of derision." He added, "The real sacrilege is the merciless repetition of 'Silent Night' and similar Christian hymns by crooners, hillbillies, dance bands and other musical barbarians."

American Tobacco Company's sponsorship of This Is Show Business ended on January 18, 1953, and Kaufman returned as a panelist on January 24, when the program became sustaining. Steve Allen filled in for Kaufman on the remaining sponsored program.

== 1956 ==
This Is Show Business returned to TV on June 19, 1956, on NBC with Fadiman as host and a panel made up Dave Garroway, Lillian Roth, and Walter Slezak. The format's components were performances by three acts and questions posed by the artists to the panelists. The program's addition to the NBC schedule was announced on June 11, accompanying an announcement of cancellation of plans for a musical program that would have featured Paul Whiteman. The Hazel Bishop cosmetics company, which would have sponsored the Whiteman program, became the sponsor of This Is Show Business. Mansfield was the producer.
