= Dolores (Susann novel) =

1976 novel by Jacqueline Susann

- First edition cover
- Author: Jacqueline Susann
- Language: English
- Publisher: William Morrow and Company
- Publication date: 1976
- Publication place: United States
- ISBN: 0-552-10538-4

Dolores is the final novel of American writer Jacqueline Susann. Published by William Morrow in 1976, it is a roman à clef based on the life of Jacqueline Kennedy. It first appeared in the February 1974 issue of the Ladies' Home Journal, seven months before Susann's death from cancer.

== Plot ==
The beautiful and fashionable Dolores Cortez Ryan is widowed when her husband, U.S. President James Ryan, is gunned down in New Orleans. After a year in seclusion, Dolores takes tentative steps back into the world, by having affairs first with a screenwriter, and then with Barry Haines, an attorney who likes rich women, but doesn't consider Dolores—with just $30,000 a year—quite rich enough. Finally, Dolores agrees to marry a fabulously wealthy shipping tycoon, who leaves her on their wedding night to go to his mistress.

== Background ==
The book, in actuality a novella, is by far the shortest fiction of Susann's career, at just 201 pages. Susann wrote the story for the Ladies' Home Journal, and it was first published in that magazine's February 1974 issue. Journal editor Lenore Hershey had asked Susann to write a piece about Jacqueline Kennedy Onassis ("Jackie S on Jackie O"), but Susann was unwilling to devote her time to research as she was seriously ill with cancer.

The Journal had offered Susann $20,000 for 20,000 words, but the manuscript she turned in was nearly 38,000 words. It was cut by Journal editors, but the excisions were restored when the story was published in book form. Certain details were changed in the book (for example, in the original story, Dolores's husband, Jimmy Ryan, is felled by a heart attack, not by an assassin's bullet). Rumors that film critic (and friend of Susann) Rex Reed rewrote the work are unsubstantiated.

The book is dedicated to the author's mother, Rose Susann (1892–1981).

== Reception ==
As always with Jacqueline Susann's novels, the critics were harsh. A reviewer for The New York Times wrote, "The novel is a fanzine version of clippings and rumors.... The writing is sluggish and the plot limp." The reading public nonetheless embraced the book: the hardcover spent 25 weeks on the New York Times best seller list, peaking at #2 for seven consecutive weeks, and becoming the third highest-selling novel of 1976, behind Leon Uris's Trinity and Agatha Christie's final mystery, Sleeping Murder. The 1978 Bantam edition reached #1 on the Times paperback list.
