= The Love Machine (novel) =

1969 novel by Jacqueline Susann

- First edition cover
- Author: Jacqueline Susann
- Language: English
- Publisher: Simon & Schuster
- Publication date: May 14, 1969
- Publication place: United States
- Media type: Print (hardcover and paperback)
- Pages: 512 pp (First edition, cloth)
- ISBN: 0-553-10530-2 (First edition, cloth)

The Love Machine is the second novel by Jacqueline Susann, and the follow-up to her enormously successful Valley of the Dolls (1966). It was published by Simon & Schuster in 1969, and became a New York Times number-one best seller.

== Plot summary ==
The Love Machine tells the story of ruthless, haunted Robin Stone and his life and career in the cut-throat world of 1960s network television. Handsome but promiscuous, earning his nickname the Love Machine after he describes television with the same sobriquet, Robin is loved beyond all reason by three women: Amanda, the beautiful but doomed fashion model; Maggie, the beautiful but headstrong fellow journalist escaping a cruel society marriage; and Judith, the beautiful but aging wife of fourth-network founder Gregory Austin.

As Robin rises and falls (both in and out of his bedroom), many people cross his path. They include:

- Christie Lane, the vulgar but vulnerable comic and singer who becomes an unlikely TV variety star with an equally unlikely family-friendly image;
- Ethel Evans, the homely but athletic "celebrity fucker" who lusts for Robin but can't have him;
- Danton Miller, the dapper, desperate network executive who fears Robin and the exposure of his own private life;
- Austin, powerful and daring, but vulnerable in his own way;
- Jerry, an advertiser and sponsor who's equally fascinated and confused by Robin's emotionless lifestyle;
- Sergio, the loving but pragmatic companion to Robin's mother, the beautiful but ailing Kitty;
- Lisa, Robin's suspicious sister;
- Ike Ryan, a producer who befriends but is befuddled by Robin;
- Dip Nelson, a failed actor-turned-successful producer whose loyalty to Robin is sorely tested;
- Alfie Knight, a too-clever-by-half actor and scene maker;
- Cliff Davies, a network lawyer who mistrusts Robin and has his own agenda;
- and various prostitutes—with one of whom an unexpected encounter forces Robin to face his past and, in time, his future.

== Background ==
The title of the book refers not just to the character of Robin Stone, but to the television set itself. Susann explained, "The title has a dual meaning... the man is like a machine and so is the television box, a machine selling the love of the actors and love of the sponsors.”

Robin Stone is said to be based on James Aubrey, former president of the CBS television network. Aubrey, known as the "smiling cobra," apparently heard "what Susann was up to" and told her to "make me mean, a real son of a bitch."

Of Susann's novels, The Love Machine is the only one which has at its center a male character. Susann stated it was an "attempt to get inside of men's ids." It's also the only Susann novel with an ostensibly happy ending.

Susann dedicated the book to her friend Carol Bjorkman, a columnist for Women's Wear Daily, who died of leukemia in 1967.

== Reception ==
Critical reception of The Love Machine was not positive, but it was slightly better than that of Valley of the Dolls. Although Christopher Lehmann-Haupt of The New York Times wrote that the novel "is popcorn... the kernel of an idea, the seed of an inspiration, exploded into bite-sized nothingness." Nora Ephron, in the same newspaper, said "'The Love Machine' is a far better book than 'Valley'—better written, better plotted, better structured." As with Valley, the reviews did not affect sales: The Love Machine spent 32 weeks on the Times best seller list, with 13 of those weeks at #1. The book became the third highest-selling novel of the year, behind just Philip Roth's Portnoy's Complaint and Mario Puzo's The Godfather.

== Film adaptation ==
Columbia Pictures bought the film rights for $1.5 million, which was a record sum for the time. (Note: As news of the movie sale went public, Susann encountered Aristotle Onassis at a New York restaurant. Onassis--apparently impressed by her earning potential--told Susann, "I think I'm married to the wrong Jackie." (Seaman, Lovely Me, pp. 392-93.)) Released in August 1971, the film was executive-produced by Susann's husband, Irving Mansfield and directed by Jack Haley Jr., with actors Dyan Cannon, Robert Ryan, and John Phillip Law as Robin. Actor Brian Kelly, whom Susann had called "the perfect Robin Stone", was cast, but just prior to filming, Kelly was nearly killed in a motorcycle accident. Law was hurriedly cast, and wore many of the costumes already designed for Kelly in the film which were apparent were not properly fitted to his size.

Dionne Warwick, who had a major hit with "(Theme from) Valley of the Dolls" in 1968, sang two songs written for the film, "He's Moving On (Theme from The Love Machine)" and "Amanda's Theme." The film soundtrack was released on Scepter Records. Susann herself had a cameo as a television newscaster. (Note: Susann also played a bit part in Valley of the Dolls; she referred to each brief appearance as her "Hitchcock." (Seaman, Lovely Me, p. 344.))

Like the film adaptation of Valley of the Dolls before it, The Love Machine received negative reviews. Unlike Valley, however, the film version of The Love Machine was a box-office failure.
