= Bernard J. Geis =

American editor and publisher

Bernard J. Geis (August 30, 1909 – January 8, 2001) was an American editor and publisher who founded the now-defunct Bernard Geis Associates, which published and promoted several best-sellers in the 1960s and 70s, including Jacqueline Susann's Valley of the Dolls and Helen Gurley Brown's Sex and the Single Girl and David Wilkerson's The Cross and the Switchblade.

== Biography ==
=== Early life ===
Geis was born in Chicago on August 30, 1909, the youngest son of Harry Geis, a cigar manufacturer. Geis was an editor for Northwestern University's school newspaper in 1931. He graduated with a degree in English that same year.

=== Early years in publishing ===
Geis began his career in advertising but then became a magazine editor for Esquire and Coronet. He later moved into book publishing, working for Grosset & Dunlap and Prentice Hall. While at Grosset & Dunlap, Geis suggested the name of their paperback arm, Bantam Books. At Prentice Hall, Geis published Art Linkletter's Kids Say the Darndest Things. The book was based on Linkletter's interviews with children, which was a segment of his television show, House Party.

=== Career at Bernard Geis Associates ===
The success of Art Linkletter's book led to Geis starting his own publishing company, Bernard Geis Associates, in 1959. Backers included Linkletter, Groucho Marx, and television producers Mark Goodson and Bill Todman.

Geis focused heavily on promotion of books. Letty Cottin Pogrebin, his head of publicity from 1960 to 1970, told the New York Times, "[Geis] made authors into celebrities and celebrities into authors. Other publishers were very buttoned-down, and believed it was a gentleman's profession." Pogrebin also went on to say that Geis would give her about $100,000 to promote the books, and he pushed his authors to aggressively plug their books through interviews. Simon & Schuster's Michael Korda described Geis's use of Hollywood-style publicity tactics a "shameless blend of column plants, celebrity appearances, and Hollywood gossip that was new to publishing but was old hat for theater and movies."

Geis published Jacqueline Susann's Valley of the Dolls, which went on to spend 65 weeks on the New York Times Best Seller list. He also published Helen Gurley Brown's Sex and the Single Girl. Geis also published books by celebrities, including President Harry S. Truman, Groucho Marx, Harpo Marx, and Art Linkletter.

His partners withdrew from backing the company in 1967 after Geis began publishing novels featuring highly sexual content and characters resembling real celebrities. Random House discontinued distribution over the book The King by Morton Cooper, whose main character was rumored to be based on Frank Sinatra, and a number of partners including Linkletter, Groucho Marx, Goodson and Todman backed out over The Exhibitionist by Henry Sutton (a pseudonym for novelist David R. Slavitt).

Time Inc. sued and then lost a lawsuit against Bernard Geis Associates, Random House and author Josiah Thompson in 1968. Thompson authored the book, Six Seconds in Dallas, which examined the assassination of John F. Kennedy. The book included sketches of pictures in Life Magazine which were photos of stills taken from the Zapruder film which Time, Inc. owned. The judges ruled in favor of Thomson and Geis saying that "There is public interest in having the fullest information available on the murder of President Kennedy. Thompson did serious work on the subject and has a theory entitled to public consideration. The book is not bought because it contained the Zapruder pictures; the book is bought because of the theory of Thompson and its explanation supported by the Zapruder pictures.

Geis Associates filed for bankruptcy protection in 1971. The company's books were later published under the Geis imprint for other publishing houses up until 1995.

In his memoir, Writing Places, author William Zinsser described meeting with Geis in 1987. Zinsser had been looking for an office to rent to do some writing and saw an ad saying "East 50s publisher seeks subtenant." Zinsser was surprised to find a fireman's pole installed in the office between the 5th and 4th floors. The office manager told him that Geis had had it installed and "he always [used] it when he [left]." Geis was then 78.

=== Marriage and children ===
Bernard Geis was married to author and editor Darlene Geis (April 8, 1917 - March 25, 1999), who died in a fire at her home in Manhattan.

Darlene Geis was the author of a number of popular books for young readers including The Little Train That Won a Medal (Wonder Books, Grosset & Dunlap, 1947), which sold more than 3 million copies, The Mystery of The Thirteenth Floor (The John C. Winston Company, 1953), Dinosaurs and Other Prehistoric Animals (Grosset & Dunlap, 1959) or The How and Why Wonder Book of Dinosaurs (1960, How and Why Wonder Books, reedited several times between 1960 and 1987 and translated into several languages). Darlene Geis was also a senior editor for Harry N. Abrams beginning in 1969 where she edited and wrote books for Disney including "Treasury of Children's Classics" and "The Fantasia Book."

Bernard and Darlene Geis had two sons: Peter and Stephen Geis.

=== Death ===
Bernard Geis died at New York Presbyterian Hospital on January 8, 2001, aged 91.
