= Pick-up sticks (disambiguation) =

Pick-up sticks is a game of physical and mental skill.

Pick-up sticks or its variations may also refer to:

- Pick-Up Sticks (novel), children's novel by Sarah Ellis
- Pick-up sticks (Haida), playing sticks made by the Haida people
- Pick-up stick, a weaving tool used mostly in combination with a rigid-heddle weaving loom.
- "Pick Up Sticks", song by The Dave Brubeck Quartet from their album Time Out
- Pick Up Stix, an Asian restaurant
