= Farm tools =

Farm tools could refer to:

- List of agricultural machinery
- Garden tools that are the same as agricultural tools
- Variant of the Pick-up sticks game
