= George Emmons =

George Emmons may refer to:

- George F. Emmons (1811–1884), rear admiral of the United States Navy
- George T. Emmons (1852–1945), ethnographic photographer and US Navy lieutenant; son of the above
