= James Naylor =

James Naylor may refer to:

- James Nayler, or Naylor, English Quaker leader
- James Ball Naylor, American doctor and writer
- Jimmy Naylor English footballer
