= Egg and wine diet =

Fad diet consisting of eggs, wine and steak

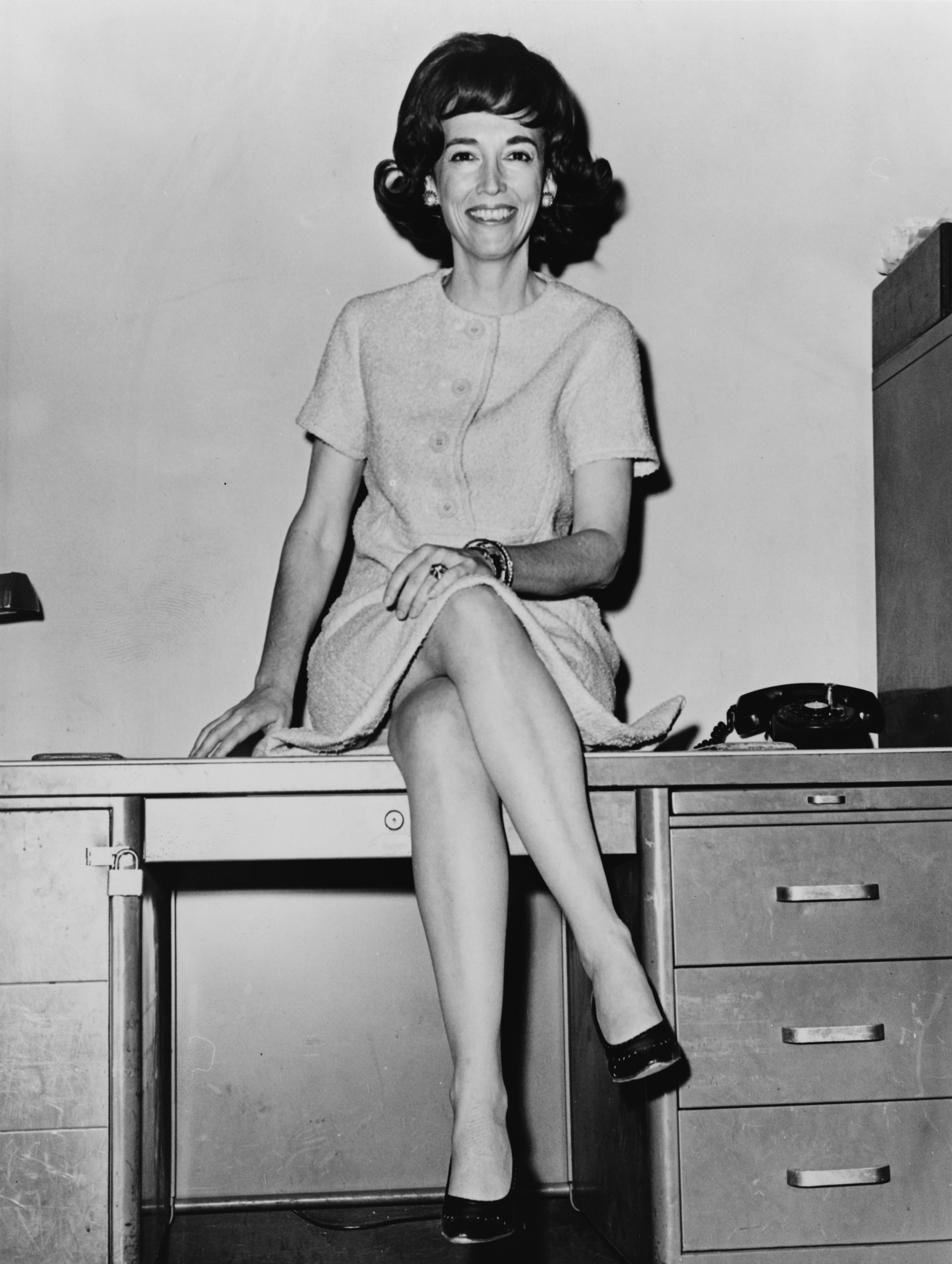
Helen Gurley Brown in 1964

The egg and wine diet is a fad diet that was popularized in 1964 and revived in 2018 on social media platforms.

The egg and wine diet was first popularized in Helen Gurley Brown's book Sex and the Single Girl: The Unmarried Woman’s Guide to Men in 1962 and was published in the Vogue magazine in 1977. The diet advocated the consumption of 3-5 eggs per day plus a 24-US-fluid-ounce (710 ml) bottle of wine. For breakfast one egg and a glass of wine are taken, for lunch two eggs and another glass and for dinner a 5-ounce (140 g) steak and the rest of the bottle of wine.

The diet was revived in 2018 on social media platforms and became a meme. Medical experts have warned against the diet as it is nutritionally unbalanced, unsustainable and in the long run will do more harm than good. The high-alcohol content of the diet has been described as dangerous and a threat to the liver.
