= Jonchets =

French children's game

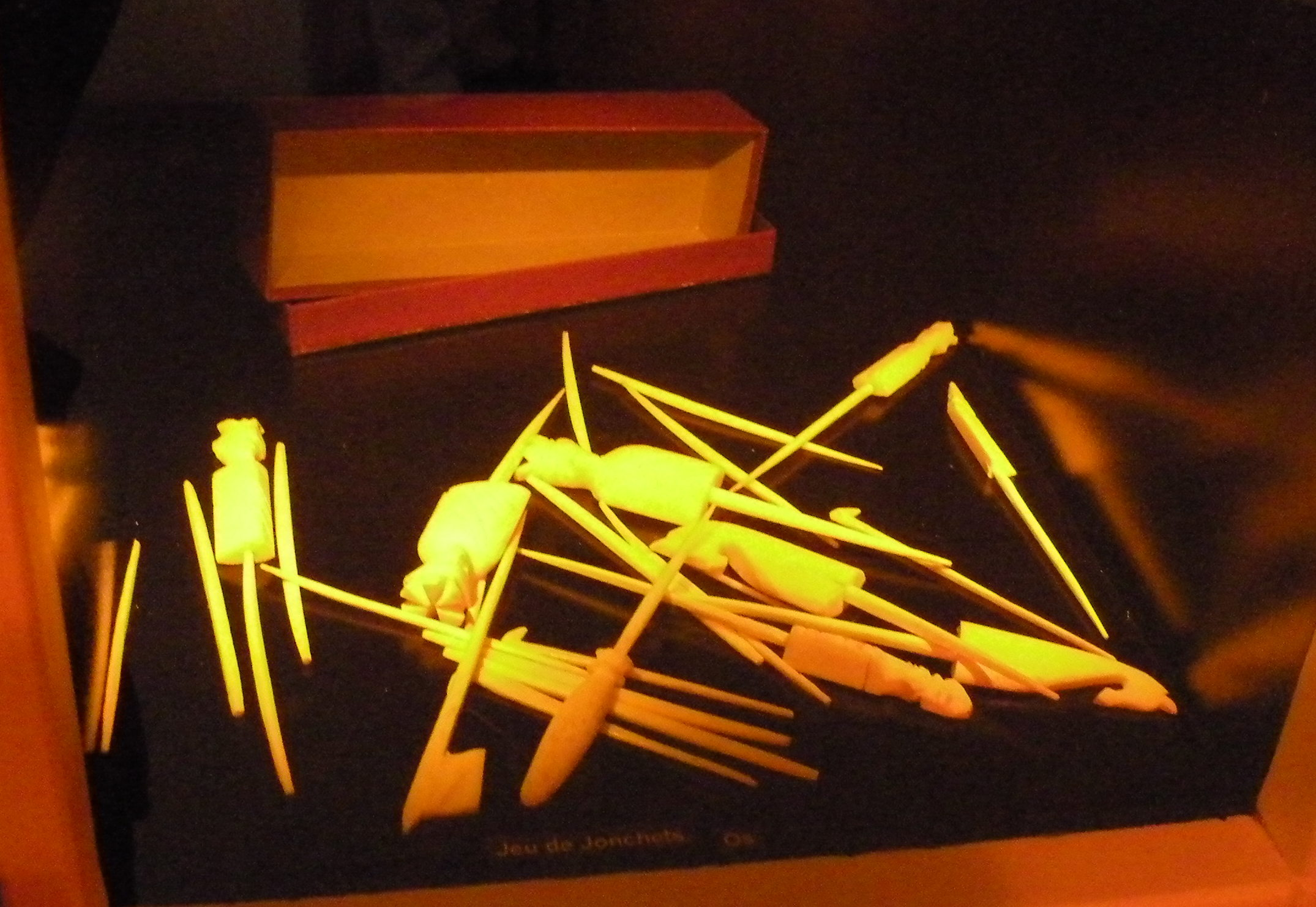
Jonchets sticks

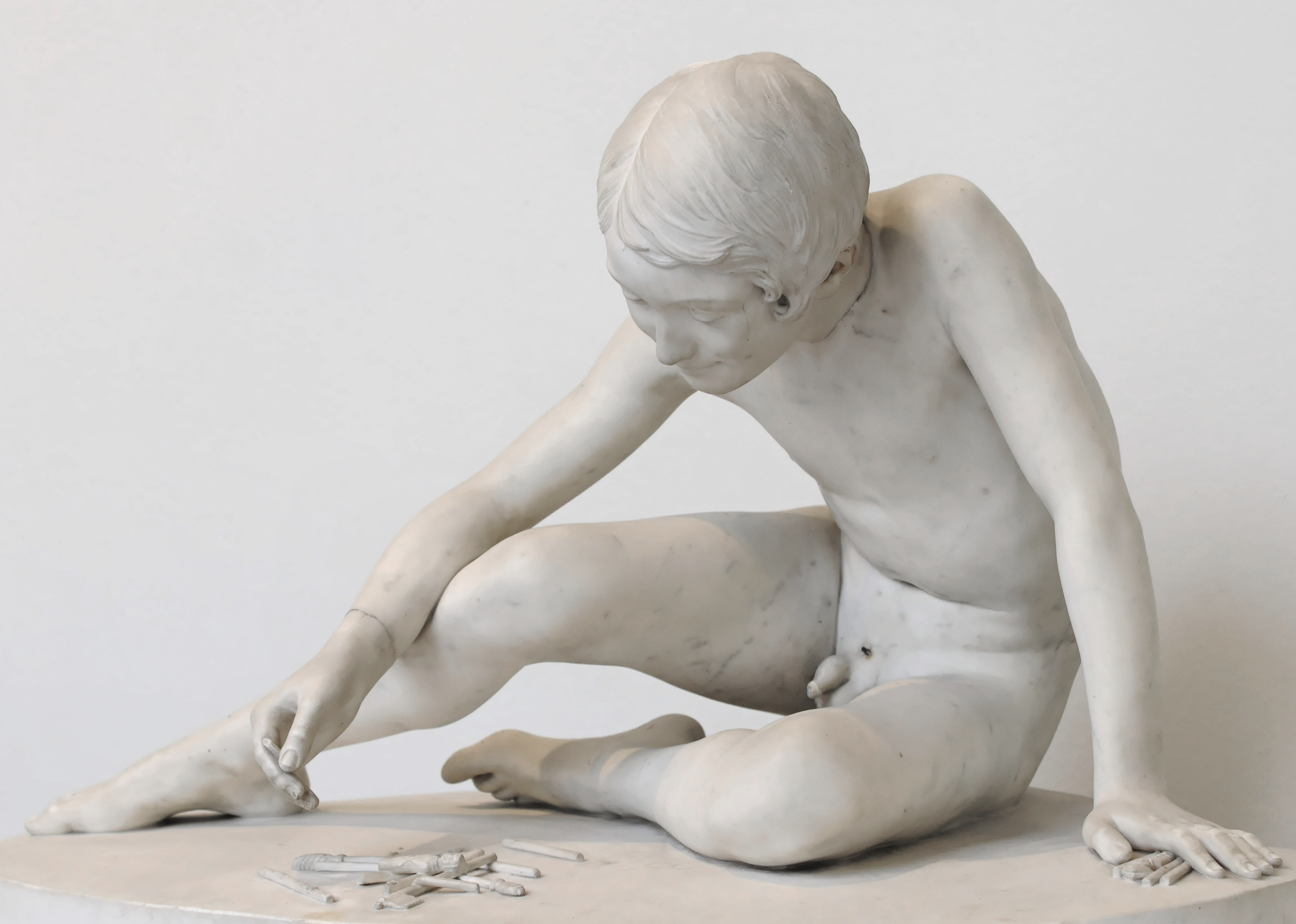
"Boy playing onchets" by Julien-Charles Dubois (1842), Museum of Fine Arts of Rennes

Jonchets or onchets is a pick-up sticks game from France played with carved sticks. References to the game date back as far as the 17th century, and it was quite popular at the start of the 20th century. The sticks were originally made of rush, but later also from wood, bone or ivory.

Jonchets can be played by 2 to 4 players, with 30 to 40 sticks at a length of 10 centimetres (3.9 in). The sticks are thrown on a table, and the rules of play are likely similar to pick-up sticks. In jonchets, some sticks may have carved heads that denote different point values.

Name	Value	Number of the sticks
King	50 points	1 stick
Queen	40 points	1 stick
Flag	30 points	1 stick
Servant	20 points	4 sticks
Rider	10 points	8 sticks
Soldier	5 points	15–25 sticks

Mikado is a simplified variation that may have been directly inspired by jonchets.

"Jonchets" were the name of a stick abacus calcus form in France with Asian background.
