= Sex and the Single Girl =

Book by Helen Gurley Brown

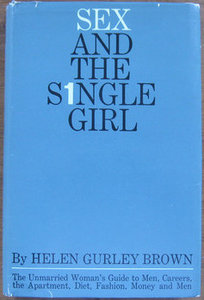
- First-edition cover
- Author: Helen Gurley Brown
- Language: English
- Genre: Non-fiction
- Publisher: Bernard Geis Associates
- Publication date: 1962
- Publication place: United States
- ISBN: 9781569802526
- OCLC: 51342662
- Followed by: Sex and the Office (1965).

Sex and the Single Girl is a 1962 non-fiction book by American writer Helen Gurley Brown, written as an advice book that encouraged women to become financially independent and experience sexual relationships before or without marriage. The book became a succès de scandale, selling two million copies in three weeks, being sold in 35 countries and making the Los Angeles Times, The New York Times and Time bestseller lists.

== Publication ==
In 1960 Brown's husband, David Brown, suggested she write a book that discusses "how a single girl goes about having an affair". The book was rejected by several publishing houses until it was accepted by Bernard J. Geis of Bernard Geis Associates.

The original title was Sex for the Single Girl, but this was changed because "it sounded like [it] was advocating sex for all single girls." Brown had also written a section on contraceptive methods that was omitted from the final publication.

The book was advertised through a large-scale campaign created by Letty Cottin Pogrebin of Bernard Geis Associates in conjunction with Brown. The campaign involved print ads as well as television, radio and bookstore appearances; however, Brown often was barred from saying "sex" during her television appearances. Cottin and Brown also attempted to have the book censored or banned in the United States as a marketing gimmick, but they were unsuccessful. The book also was endorsed on the jacket by Joan Crawford and Gypsy Rose Lee, and the 2003 edition is endorsed on the back cover by Sex and the City's Kim Cattrall.

Following the success of Sex and the Single Girl, Brown became the editor of Cosmopolitan magazine in 1965, and went on to publish several other books, which include Sex and the Office (1965), Helen Gurley Brown's Single Girl's Cookbook (1969), and Sex and the New Single Girl (1970).

== Summary ==
In the 2003 edition, Brown includes a reintroduction to her book and briefly outlines the static situations and changes that the single woman has faced from the 1960s to 2003.

- "Chapter 1. Women Alone? Oh Come Now!" The first chapter introduces the single girl to the advantages of her situation, and offers brief advice that will be expanded upon in the following chapters.
- "Chapter 2. The Availables: The Men in Your Life" Brown suggests that the single girl make a list of all the men in her life and then slot them into the following categories: "The Eligibles", "The Eligibles-But-Who-Needs-Them", "The Don Juans", "The Married Man", "The Homosexual", "The Divorcing Man" and "The Younger Man". She then proceeds to advise how to handle the men in each category.
- "Chapter 3. Where to Meet Them" The obstacles the single girl faces, and how to overcome them, when meeting men in such environments such as: "Your Job", "Friends of Friends", and "Alcoholics Anonymous".
- "Chapter 4. How to Be Sexy" Outlines the different styles of sexy and how to achieve a "sexth sense", and also refers to Alfred Kinsey's reports.
- "Chapter 5. Nine to Five" Includes "Mother Brown's Twelve Rules for Squirming, Worming, Inching, and Pinching Your Way to the Top".
- "Chapter 6. Money Money Money" This chapter explains how to stretch your money in areas such as driving and eating, because "nobody likes a poor girl. She is just a drag."
- "Chapter 7. The Apartment" Discusses decorating on a budget, hiring a decorator and do it yourself tips such as including "Gobs of Pictures" and how to achieve "A Sexy Kitchen".
- "Chapter 8. The Care and Feeding of Everybody" Includes different methods of at home entertaining and recipes for "Three Fabulous Little Dinners and One Semi–Fabulous Brunch".
- "Chapter 9. The Shape You're In" The chapter on how to eat well and stay fit with "Gladys Lindberg's Serenity Cocktail", "Ruth West's Stop Dieting! Start Losing!", the "Sexercise" chapter in "Bonnie Prudden's How to Keep Slender and Fit After Thirty", and other methods.
- "Chapter 10. The Wardrobe" A quick guide to understanding fashion, shopping and sewing.
- "Chapter 11. Kisses and Make-Up" Step-by-step instructions on cosmetic changes such as make-up, facial hair bleaching (includes formula to mix at home), and contact lenses.
- "Chapter 12. The Affair: From the Beginning to End" A step-by-step guide that should prepare a single girl for what will occur, or should occur during the beginning, middle and end stages of an affair.
- "Chapter 13. The Rich, Full Life" Includes any advice that did not belong under the previous chapter headings.

== Critical analysis ==
The reviews that followed the publication of Sex and the Single Girl, "were either highly favourable...or highly negative" and often attacked Brown's writing style and credibility. While several of Brown's concepts were "in common with the second-wave feminist arguments she precedes," other second-wavers such as Betty Friedan "found Brown's message 'obscene and horrible.'" When questioned regarding the criticism the book has received, Brown replied that:

This is how it was for me. This is how I played it. It's just a pippy-poo little book and people come back with this diatribe about its great social significance. Well it's just because nobody ever got off his high horse long enough to write to single women in any form they could associate with. If they had, somebody else would be the arbiter for single women at this point instead of me.

Jennifer Scanlon, author of Bad Girls Go Everywhere: The Life of Helen Gurley Brown, argues that through Sex and the Single Girl Brown became "not only one of the founders of second wave feminism but stands as a key antecedent for the third." Scanlon also argues that with Sex and the Single Girl, Brown would "cross the line between the fictional and the real", exploring the real single women that had been previously presented in fictional form in such novels as Peyton Place (1956) and The Best of Everything (1958).

Julie Berebitsky explores the impact of Sex and the Single Girl on the pink-collar worker of the 1960s and Brown's blurring of the professional and the personal in a business environment, as she "directed women to seek professional advancement...to use gender, and to varying degrees, sexuality for their own gain." Berebitsky also contrasts Sex and the Single Girl with The Executive Secretary, a guidebook published in 1959 by Marilyn Burke, secretary to Dale Carnegie and Dorothy Carnegie, that cautions against demonstrations of female sexuality in the workforce.

== Interpretation ==
Jennifer Scanlon suggests that Sex and the City is "the most direct descendent of the sexual politics Helen Gurley Brown introduced in Sex and the Single Girl" and Jane Gerhard argues that "Sex and the City pays direct homage" to Sex and the Single Girl, as both present the "connection between women's financial independence and their sexual liberation."

AMC's Mad Men creator, Matthew Weiner, frequently attributes Sex and the Single Girl and The Feminine Mystique as heavily influencing the creation of his characters and scenarios, especially involving the single female office worker Peggy Olson.

== Supplemented edition ==
The Four Square paperback edition published (in London) in 1964 includes "£ove $tory", an unpaginated 32-page supplement by the cartoonist and illustrator John Glashan, between pages 128 and 129.

== Film adaptation ==
Warner Bros. paid $200,000 for the rights to the book, which was made into a film of the same name (1964), starring Natalie Wood, Tony Curtis, Henry Fonda and Lauren Bacall. The film version follows the main character, Dr. Helen Gurley Brown (Wood), based loosely on the real Brown (who held a business degree but no doctorate), through several comedic situations resulting from the publication of her book Sex and the Single Girl.

== See also ==
- Egg and wine diet (as popularized in Sex and the Single Girl)
- List of best-selling books
