= Saalfield Publishing =

Publisher of children's books and related products, 1900-1977

- Status: Defunct
- Founded: 1900
- Founder: Arthur J. Saalfield
- Defunct: 1977
- Country of origin: United States
- Headquarters location: Akron, Ohio, U.S.
- Publication types: Books
- Fiction genres: children's books

The Saalfield Publishing Company of Akron, Ohio published children's books and other products from 1900 to 1977. It was once one of the largest publishers of children's materials in the world.

The company was founded in 1900 in Akron, Ohio, by Arthur J. Saalfield who had come to take charge of the Werner Company's publishing department. During its flourishing, the company published the works of authors including Louisa May Alcott, Lewis Carroll, Horatio Alger, P. T. Barnum, Daniel Defoe, Laura Lee Hope, Herman Melville, Dr. Seuss, Anna Sewell, Shirley Temple, Johanna Spyri, Mark Twain, Johann Rudolf Wyss, Ohio author, columnist, poet, and humorist James Ball Naylor, and Robert Sidney Bowen. Colonel George Durston was a commonly used house name for ghost writers working with this publisher.

Saalfield published the New Americanized Encyclopædia Britannica in 1903, and was sued for copyright violation.

The company also published educational toys and games, including the game Blockhead!.

A page from Ethel Hays's version of Peter Rabbit © Saalfield Publishing Company.

Among the artists employed by Saalfield was noted illustrator Ethel Hays. She worked on a variety of the company's juvenile titles, including Peter Rabbit, The Night Before Christmas, and The Little Red Hen. Her most notable work came after Saalfield had secured the license from the Johnny Gruelle Company in 1944 to produce Raggedy Ann and Andy material. Storybooks, coloring books, and paper doll booklets soon followed. Most of the artwork fell to Hays, "whose exuberant, curvilinear style perfectly captured the whimsy and energy of Gruelle's characters." Another artist/illustrator who did work for Saalfield was Frances Brundage. Brundage, who also did work for Raphael Tuck & Sons and other publishers, illustrated many classic works for children, and had widespread popularity; books with her illustrations are actively collected.

In April 1977, Saalfield Publishing Company shut down, and its library and archives were purchased by Kent State University.

== Lawsuit over New Americanized Encyclopædia Britannica ==
Saalfield published the Americanized Encyclopædia Britannica in 8 volumes with a 4 volume supplement (when the British edition had 24 volumes). The Encyclopædia Britannica Company had acquired all the rights to the encyclopedia in America. In addition, D. Appleton & Company claimed that the 4 volume supplement used material from Appletons' Cyclopædia of American Biography.

To avoid further litigation, the suit against Saalfield Publishing was settled in court "by a stipulation in which the defendants agree not to print or sell any further copies of the offending work, to destroy all printed sheets, to destroy or melt the portions of the plates from which the infringing matter in the Supplement as it appears in the Americanized Encyclopædia Britannica has been printed, and to pay D. Appleton & Co. the sum of $2000 damages."

== Saalfield Science Series ==
In the early 1960s, the Saalfield Publishing Company competed directly with rival publisher Grosset & Dunlap by issuing their own series of science books for children. Similar in format to their competitor's then highly popular How and Why Wonder Book series, the Saalfield Science Series consisted of a set of soft-cover books on diverse science topics, aimed at capturing a share of the lucrative children's non-fiction book market.

Identical to How and Why Wonder Books, the Saalfield Science Series consisted of a list of unique titles printed in the classic 8 1/2 X 11 inch page format, with a standard book length of 48 pages each. These books were also generously illustrated with many color and black and white drawings depicting a wide range of scientific concepts. There were only six volumes published in the short-lived series. They were:

1. ...5806 Dinosaurs
2. ...5807 Water
3. ...5808 The Dawn of Man
4. ...5809 Man in Flight
5. ...5810 Man and Missiles
6. ...5811 Pine, Man and Ax

== Notable books ==
- White House Cook Book by Fanny Lemira Gilette (1900)
- Mr Bunny, His Book by Adah Louise Sutton (1900)
- Ralph Marlowe by James Ball Naylor (1901)
- In the Days of St. Clair by James Ball Naylor (1902)
- Billy Whiskers by Frances Trego Montgomery (1903)
- The Lone Indian by James A. Braden (1903)
- Under Mad Anthony's Banner by James Ball Naylor (1903)
- Boss Tom by Stanley Kemp (1904)
- The Cabin in the Clearing by James A. Braden (1904)
- The Cabin in the Big Woods by James Ball Naylor (1904)
- Captives Three by James A. Braden (1904)
- Teddy Bears by Adah Louise Sutton (1907)
- The Trail of the Seneca by James A. Braden (1907)
- The Cabin in the Clearing by James A. Braden (1927)

== Book series ==
- Auto Boys series
- Billy Whiskers Series
- Bonehill Series
- The Braden Books
- Castlemon Series
- Every Child's Library
- My ABC - Linentex picture books
- Otis Series
- The Peter Rabbit Series
- Rathborne Series
- Saalfield Science Series
- Saalfield's Muslin Books
- Saalfield's Tiny Muslin Books
- The War Adventure Series
- Winfield Series
- The World's War Series

== See also ==
- History of the Encyclopædia Britannica
- How and Why Wonder Books
