= How and Why Wonder Books =

Series of American illustrated books published in the 1960s and 1970s

How and Why Wonder Books were a series of American illustrated books published in the 1960s and 1970s that were designed to teach science and history to children and young teenagers. The series began in 1960 and was edited under the supervision of Paul E. Blackwood of the Office of Education at the U.S. Department of Health, Education and Welfare. The series was published by Wonder Books, Inc., a division of Grosset & Dunlap.

== Listing ==
There were 74 unique titles in the series, each one starting with the phrase The How and Why Wonder Book of… as a key component of the book's name. All 74 volumes were published in a softcover format, with pages measuring 8 1/2 × 11 inches (21.6 × 27.9 cm) in size. A number of the titles were also produced in hardcover versions, too; these being referred to as either the "Trade Editions" or the "Library Editions." Each How and Why Wonder Book uniformly contained a total of 48 pages, with the only exception being The Environment and You, which contained 64 pages.

The softcover books were numbered consecutively in series starting at 5001 (with the only exception being the final book in the series entitled Fossils). The hardcover versions were numbered differently from the softcover issues.

1. 5001 Dinosaurs
2. 5002 Weather
3. 5003 Electricity
4. 5004 Rocks and Minerals
5. 5005 Rockets and Missiles
6. 5006 Stars
7. 5007 Insects
8. 5008 Reptiles and Amphibians
9. 5009 Birds
10. 5010 Our Earth
11. 5011 Beginning Science
12. 5012 Machines
13. 5013 The Human Body
14. 5014 Sea Shells
15. 5015 Atomic Energy
16. 5016 The Microscope
17. 5017 The Civil War
18. 5018 Mathematics
19. 5019 Flight
20. 5020 Ballet
21. 5021 Chemistry
22. 5022 Horses
23. 5023 Explorations and Discoveries
24. 5024 Primitive Man
25. 5025 North America
26. 5026 Planets and Interplanetary Travel
27. 5027 Wild Animals
28. 5028 Sound
29. 5029 Lost Cities
30. 5030 Ants and Bees
31. 5031 Wild Flowers
32. 5032 Dogs
33. 5033 Prehistoric Mammals
34. 5034 Science Experiments
35. 5035 World War II
36. 5036 Florence Nightingale
37. 5037 Butterflies and Moths
38. 5038 Fish
39. 5039 Robots and Electronic Brains
40. 5040 Light and Color
41. 5041 Winning of the West
42. 5042 The American Revolution
43. 5043 Caves to Skyscrapers
44. 5044 Ships
45. 5045 Time
46. 5046 Magnets and Magnetism
47. 5047 Guns
48. 5048 The Moon
49. 5049 Famous Scientists
50. 5050 The Old Testament
51. 5051 Building
52. 5052 Railroads
53. 5053 Trees
54. 5054 Oceanography
55. 5055 North American Indians
56. 5056 Mushrooms, Ferns and Mosses
57. 5057 The Polar Regions
58. 5058 Coins and Currency
59. 5059 Basic Inventions
60. 5060 The First World War
61. 5061 Electronics
62. 5062 Deserts
63. 5063 Air and Water
64. 5064 Stars
65. 5065 Airplanes and the Story of Flight
66. 5066 Fish
67. 5067 Boats and Ships
68. 5068 The Moon
69. 5069 Trains and Railroads
70. 5070 Ecology
71. 5071 The Environment and You
72. 5072 Extinct Animals
73. 5073 Snakes
74. 5076 Fossils

When publication of the How and Why Wonder Book series first commenced in 1960, only the initial six titles in the series were produced. As time went by, and as the series proved to be highly successful, more new titles were added to expand its scope.

At the same time, a handful of titles also disappeared from the comprehensive "checklists" (located on back covers) when these volumes were revised and republished under a different title and/or series number. Specifically, there were six titles that were removed from checklists when they were reissued with a later series number. They were:

1. 5006 Stars (reissued as 5064 Stars)
2. 5019 Flight (reissued as 5065 Airplanes and the Story of Flight)
3. 5038 Fish (reissued as 5066 Fish)
4. 5044 Ships (reissued as 5067 Boats and Ships)
5. 5048 The Moon (reissued as 5068 The Moon)
6. 5052 Railroads (reissued as 5069 Trains and Railroads)

Although some of the titles were not altered from earlier versions, both the cover artwork and the interior content were changed. Thus, it is easy to distinguish between the early versions and the latter issues by the cover art alone.

The first 69 books in the series were issued with illustrated cover art, otherwise referred to as Painted Covers, during the 1960s. Later reprints in the 1970s, however, switched to Photo Covers. In fact, four of the last five volumes in the series were only produced in a photo cover version (Ecology, Extinct Animals, Snakes, and Fossils). In an unexplained departure, one of the final five titles (The Environment and You) was only issued in a painted cover, even though it was not released until the 1970s.

== The mystery of the missing series numbers ==
A mystery for collectors is the absence of How and Why Wonder Book volumes numbered 5074 or 5075. While it may well have been the original intent of publishers to fill in these missing gaps in the series sequence, this was never done. With the advent of the ISBN numbering system, the 5075 number was eventually assigned to a 1985 hardcover reprint of Earl Schenck Miers book America and Its Presidents (ISBN 0-448-05075-7). The ISBN associated with number 5074 (ISBN 0-448-05074-9) has never been assigned.

== Price Stern Sloan How and Why editions ==
Price Stern Sloan took over the publication of the How and Why series and released many of the existing titles with new covers. In addition they added some new titles to the list:

1. Space
2. Solar System
3. Living Things
4. Planet Earth
5. Motorcycles
6. Automobiles
7. Ships and Submarines
8. Robots
9. Radiation
10. Aircraft

The first four of these had the series name How and Why Wonder Books above the title; the remainder reverted to the original The How and Why Wonder Book of... formulation.

== How and Why Activity Wonder Books ==
Price Stern Sloan also released a matching series of activity books that contained mazes, puzzles and games about the subject they contained. Titles released in this series were:

1. Beginning Science
2. Cats
3. Dinosaurs
4. The Earth
5. Four Famous Dinosaurs
6. Human Body
7. Insects
8. Prehistoric Animals
9. Reptiles
10. Rocks and Minerals
11. Sharks
12. Space
13. Wild Animals
14. Wild Animals of North America

== The UK series ==
During the 1960s and 1970s, the How and Why Wonder Book series was concurrently published in the United Kingdom by Transworld Publishers of London. For the most part, both the cover artwork and the inner content of the UK volumes were identical to those of the U.S. publications. However, a handful of the UK versions contained either revised text and/or unique cover art. Many of these revisions were done to reflect European species (Birds, Insects) or to emphasize regional conditions.

The UK series was published using a completely different numbering sequence from the U.S. series (Dinosaurs is number 6501, Stars is 6503, etc.). Also, the UK version of Extinct Animals has a painted cover as opposed to the U.S. version's photo cover.

The following standard series titles were released in the UK by Transworld Publishers. Unless otherwise indicated, both the content and cover art used were identical to those of the American versions:

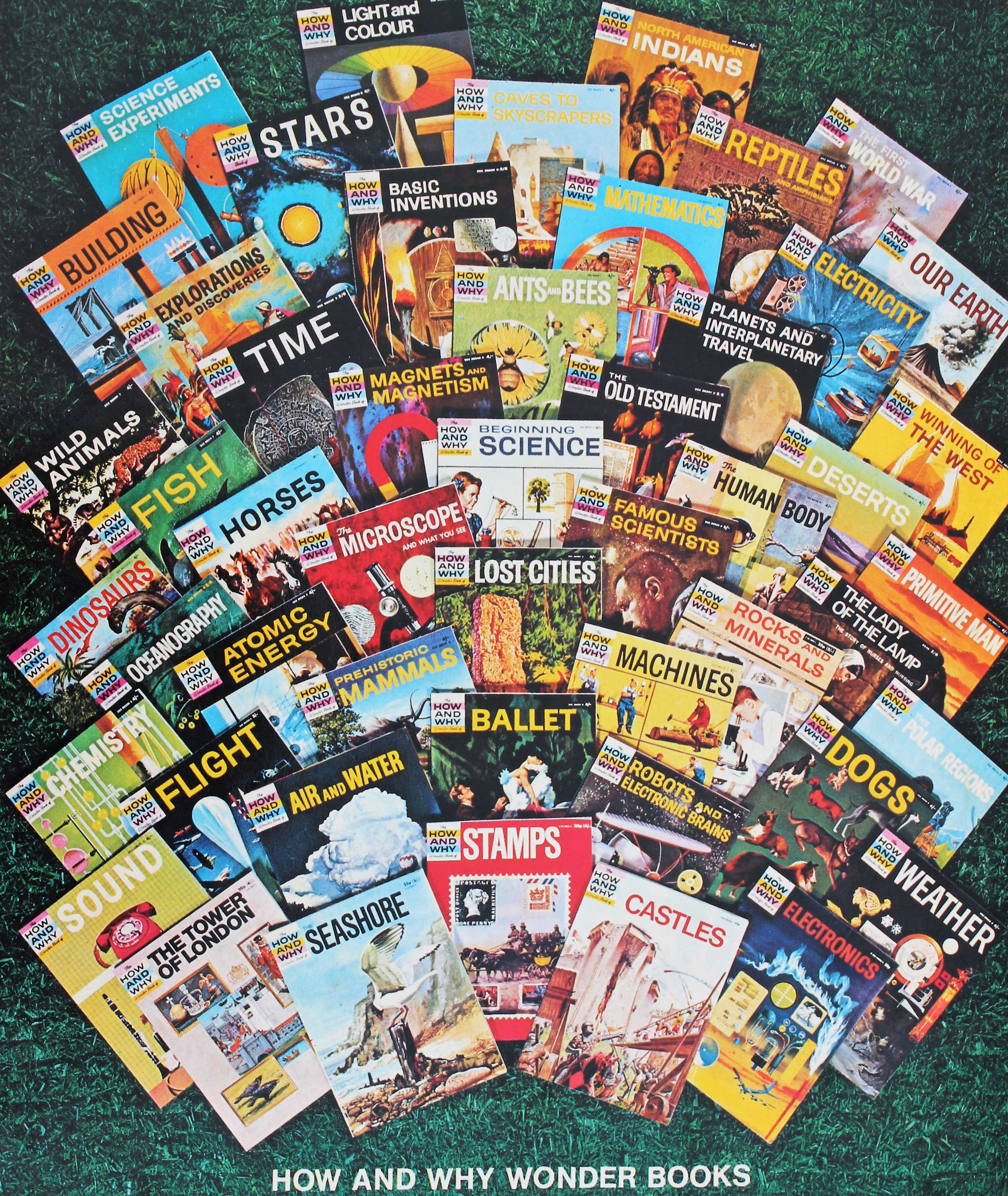
How and Why Wonder Books

- 6501 Dinosaurs
- 6502 Weather
- 6503 Stars
- 6504 The Human Body
- 6505 Chemistry
- 6506 Horses
- 6507 Planets and Interplanetary Travel
- 6508 Wild Animals
- 6509 Lost Cities
- 6510 Dogs
- 6511 Fish
- 6512 Caves to Skyscrapers
- 6513 Our Earth
- 6514 The First World War (different cover art from US version)
- 6515 Explorations and Discoveries (different cover from later US softcover, but same as US hardcover and initial US softcover)
- 6516 Mathematics
- 6517 Primitive Man
- 6518 Science Experiments
- 6519 The Microscope
- 6520 Flight
- 6521 Prehistoric Mammals
- 6522 Atomic Energy
- 6523 Robots and Electronic Brains
- 6524 Ballet
- 6525 Electricity
- 6526 Machines
- 6527 Sound
- 6528 Ants and Bees
- 6529 Light and Colour
- 6530 Reptiles
- 6531 Rocks and Minerals
- 6532 Beginning Science
- 6533 Famous Scientists
- 6534 The Polar Regions
- 6535 North American Indians
- 6536 The Lady of the Lamp (identical to US Florence Nightingale version, but unique title)
- 6537 Winning of the West
- 6538 Time
- 6539 Basic Inventions
- 6540 Magnets and Magnetism
- 6541 Old Testament
- 6542 Oceanography
- 6543 Building
- 6544 Deserts
- 6548 Rocks and Minerals (Revised Edition of #6531)
- 6550 Electronics
- 6551 Air and Water
- 6552 Railways (new text and cover art as compared to US Railroads edition)
- 6553 Birds (revised text and unique cover art)
- 6554 Coins (new text and cover art as compared to US Coins and Currency edition)
- 6555 Extinct Animals (was UK release first, subsequently released in US with different cover)
- 6557 World War II (revised text and unique cover art)
- 6561 Wild Flowers (revised text and unique cover art)
- 6562 Trees (unique cover art)
- 6564 Fossils (was UK release first, subsequently released in US with different cover)
- 6568 Butterflies and Moths (revised text and unique cover art)
- 6571 Insects (revised text and unique cover art)
- 6572 Robots and Electronic Brains (Revised Edition of #6523)
- 6575 Electronics (Revised Edition of #6550)
- 6579 Ships (unique cover art)
- 6580 Dogs (Revised Edition of #6510)
- 6581 Beginning Science (Revised Edition of #6532)
- 6585 Snakes
- 6586 Planets and Interplanetary Travel (Revised Edition of #6507)
- 6592 Weather (same cover image as U.S. edition, but revised content to #6502)
- 6595 Deserts (Same content as US edition but unique cover as compared to #6544)

In addition to the foregoing, Transworld expanded the UK series with the release of the following new, unique titles:

- 6545 The Tower of London
- 6546 Stamps
- 6547 Seashore
- 6549 Castles
- 6556 The Spoilt Earth
- 6558 Communications
- 6559 Dance
- 6560 Kings and Queens
- 6563 Photography
- 6565 Ancient Rome
- 6566 Common Market
- 6567 Volcanoes
- 6569 Vikings
- 6570 Cats
- 6573 Costume
- 6574 The Crusades
- 6576 The Motor Car
- 6577 Energy and Power Sources
- 6578 Radio and TV
- 6583 Heraldry
- 6587 Deep Sea
- 6589 Pets
- 6591 Arms and Armour
- 6596 Rare Animals
- 6597 Ancient Egypt
- 6598 Oil
- 6599 Parliament
- 6600 The Ice Age
- 6601 Arab World

Early editions of the UK volumes had a "checklist" on their back covers, similar to American copies. This format was used up until #6536 (Lady of the Lamp); released in 1967. However, soon thereafter, the format of the back cover was revised to show a photo of a random selection of some of the volumes available in the series.

In addition, Transworld published two How and Why BUMPER WONDER Books which were "puzzles, quizzes, jokes, amazing facts" using content and images from the various How and Why editions.

- Bumper Wonder Book #1 (#6584) (ISBN 0-552-86584-2)
- Bumper Wonder Book #2 (#6593) (ISBN 0-552-86593-1)

One feature of most UK editions of the How and Why books was that the back inner cover featured an advertisement for a "Collector's Binder" to hold your How and Why books. The ad read "The new How and Why collector binder holds 12 titles; a wonderful way to build your own reference library! It is available from the publishers of the How and Why books for only 16/-. Supplies are limited so send for yours now." This back inner cover advertisement was a standard feature for many years.

It also appears that four of the ISBN series numbers contained within the sequential Transworld numbering block were never assigned to volumes within the How and Why Wonder book series; these being volumes #6582 (ISBN 0-552-86582-6), #6588 (ISBN 0-552-86588-5), #6590 (ISBN 0-552-86590-7) and #6594 (ISBN 0-552-86594-X). An ISBN search of these numbers indicates that they were never assigned to published volumes.

Although the above lists are comprehensive for How and Why Wonder Book volumes published by Grosset & Dunlap and Transworld in the 1960s and 1970s, certain volumes in the series continued to be published by Price Stern Sloan into the 1980s and that additional unique titles were added to the series. New How and Why Wonder Book titles included Radiation, Ships and Submarines, Planet Earth, Living Things, Automobiles, Motorcycles, Space, Robots, Aircraft, and the Solar System. None of these titles was available earlier than 1987 and thus they do not appear in the foregoing checklists.

== Dutch translations ==
Dutch translations of the American originals were published, originally in softcover and later in hardcover, by Zuid-Nederlandse Uitgeverij at Deurne, Belgium under the titles "HOE EN WAAROM" or "Het HOE EN WAAROM boek van".

== German translations ==
German translations were published from 1961, originally in softcover and later in hardcover, by Tessloff Verlag, Hamburg, Germany, under the title "Was ist was". The edition was fairly successful and produced audio CDs and DVDs later on.

== Spanish translations ==
Spanish translations for many of these titles were published in hardcover by Editorial Molino, Barcelona, under the series title "Cómo y por qué" from 1961 to 1983.

== Writers, illustrators and photographers ==
Many individuals contributed to the How and Why Wonder Book series. They consisted of a wide spectrum of authors, artists and photographers. Some of these individuals contributed to several volumes in the How and Why Wonder Book series, while many others appeared on a one-time basis only. A partial listing of many of the individuals that contributed to the series is outlined below.

Writers: Darlene Geis, George Bonsall, Jerome J. Notkin, Sidney Gulkin, Nelson W. Hyler, Clayton Knight, Norman Hoss, Ronald Rood, Robert Mathewson, Felix Sutton, Martin L. Keen, Donald F. Low, Donald Barr, Earl Schenck Miers, Esther Harris Highland, Harold Joseph Highland, Lee Wyndham, Margaret Cabell Self, Irving Robbin, Grace F. Ferguson, Robert Scharff, Gene Liberty, Jean Bethell, Dr. Gilbert Klaperman, Geoffrey Coe, Amy Elizabeth Jensen, Dr. Paul J. Gelinas, Clare Cooper Cunniff, Shelly Grossman, Mary Louise Grossman, Matthew J. Brennan and Georg Zappler.

Illustrators and photographers: - Kenyon Shannon, George Pay, Robert Patterson, Charles Bernard, James Ponter, Cynthia Koehler, Alvin Koehler, Darrell Sweet, Douglas Allen, Ned Smith, Walter Ferguson, John Hull, George J. Zaffo, Raul Mina Mora, William Fraccio, Tony Tallarico, Leonard Vosburgh, Rafaello Busoni, Matthew Kalmenoff, Denny McMains, William Barss, Robert Doremus, Shannon Stirnweis, Shelly Grossman, Dougal MacDougal and John Barber.

== Spotlight Wonder Books and the 7900 Series ==
Closely associated with the How and Why Wonder Book series are two other series of softcover books produced by publisher Grosset and Dunlap in the 1960s under the Wonder Books banner. They are the Spotlight Wonder Book series and the otherwise nameless "7900" series.

=== Spotlight Wonder Books ===
The Spotlight Wonder Book series focused on famous people or institutions as opposed to science topics. They were identical to How and Why Wonder Books in terms of their size (8 1/2 × 11 inches, or 21.6 × 27.9 cm) and the fact that they also contained the standard 48 pages. Titles included the following:

1. 6900 The Story of John F. Kennedy
2. 6901 Into Space with the Astronauts
3. 6902 The Story of Winston Churchill
4. 6903 The White House and the Presidency
5. 6904 The Capitol and Our Lawmakers
6. 6905 The Story of the American Negro
7. 6906 The Story of the F.B.I.
8. 6907 The Story of Pope John XXIII

=== The 7900 Series ===
Similar in size and style to How and Why Wonder Books and Spotlight Wonder Books, the 7900 series pertained to television personalities/programs or fictional characters. Titles included:

1. 7900 Portrait of Skipper
2. 7901 Monsters
3. 7902 Bewitched
4. 7903 The Man from U.N.C.L.E.
5. 7904 Soupy Sales

== Conquest of the Moon ==
In 1969 Wonder Books/Grosset and Dunlap published Conquest of the Moon, a 64-page book in the same format as a How and Why Wonder Book consisting of revised content from #5048 The Moon and expanded to include the story of the Apollo 11 Moon landing mission.

== See also ==
- List of English language book publishing companies
- List of largest UK book publishers
- Saalfield Science Series
