= Sex and the Single Girl (film) =

1964 film by Richard Quine

- Theatrical release poster
- Directed by: Richard Quine
- Screenplay by: Joseph Heller; David R. Schwartz
- Story by: Joseph Hoffman
- Based on: Sex and the Single Girl; 1962 book by Helen Gurley Brown
- Produced by: William T. Orr
- Starring: Tony Curtis; Natalie Wood; Henry Fonda; Lauren Bacall; Mel Ferrer
- Cinematography: Charles Lang
- Edited by: David Wages
- Music by: Neal Hefti
- Production companies: Quine Productions; Reynard Productions
- Distributed by: Warner Bros. Pictures
- Release date: December 25, 1964 (United States)
- Running time: 114 minutes
- Country: United States
- Language: English
- Box office: $4 million (rentals)

Sex and the Single Girl is a 1964 American Technicolor comedy film directed by Richard Quine and starring Tony Curtis, Natalie Wood, Henry Fonda, Lauren Bacall and Mel Ferrer. The film was co-produced by Quine's Quine Productions and Curtis' Reynard Productions.

The film is based on Helen Gurley Brown's 1962 non-fiction book of the same name.

== Plot ==
Bob Weston works for Stop, a tabloid magazine whose owner and staff are proud of being regarded as the filthiest rag in the United States. One of Bob's colleagues has just written an article about Dr. Helen Gurley Brown, a young psychologist and author of the best-selling book Sex and the Single Girl, a self-help guide with advice to single women on how to deal with men. The article raises doubts on her experience with sex and relationships. Helen is very offended, having lost six appointments with patients due to the article discrediting her as a "23-year-old virgin." Bob wants to follow up by interviewing her, but she refuses.

Bob's friend and neighbor, stocking manufacturer Frank Broderick, is having marriage issues with his strong-willed wife Sylvia, but cannot find the time to go to a counselor. Therefore, Bob decides to impersonate Frank and go to Helen as a patient, with the goal of getting close to her in order to gather more information. Meanwhile, he will report back to Frank on her advice. During their first couple of sessions, Bob acts shy and smitten, and tries to gently seduce Helen. She seems to respond to Bob's courteous advances, all while insisting that it is a transfer and that she will play the role of Sylvia to the benefit of his therapy. After he fakes a suicide attempt, the two of them end up making out in her apartment, with Bob realizing he is actually falling for Helen, which is the reason he still has not written anything about her, prompting an ultimatum from his boss.

Helen panics at the idea that she is in turn falling for a married man, and upon suggestion from her mother, she meets Sylvia and encourages her to return to work at Frank's office, where the two of them first met and could stand together against Frank's business rivals. Sylvia had initially rejected that suggestion coming from Frank (who had heard it from Bob), but she ultimately decides to follow the advice, thus reconciling with her husband.

A terminally lovestruck Bob forces another meeting with Helen and tries to convince her his marriage is not legal, but Helen insists on hearing it from his wife and secretly asks her to come to her office. In the meantime, Bob asks his girlfriend, nightclub singer Gretchen, to pose as his wife (or rather, Frank Broderick's wife), and when she cancels at the last minute because of an audition, he asks his secretary Susan to go instead. Without telling him, Gretchen decides to forgo her audition, so she also shows up at Helen's office. Witnessing three different women claiming to be Mrs. Broderick, Helen becomes extremely confused, while a furious Sylvia calls the police on Frank, who is then arrested for bigamy.

Helen comes to visit Sylvia with fellow psychiatrist Rudy DeMeyer, who has had a crush ever since the article intimated she might be a virgin. In trying to convince Sylvia to pardon Frank, she finally discovers the man who has been coming to her office was not Frank Broderick at all, but rather Stop magazine's managing editor Bob Weston. Shocked, she asks Rudy to take her to Fiji.

In the meantime, Bob refuses to let the magazine publish anything about Helen, and is consequently fired. In a frantic final act, Helen and Rudy are driving to the airport, while Frank, after being released, has not understood that Sylvia has learned the truth, and so has decided to quit everything and run off to Hawaii with Gretchen; at the same time, Bob is chasing after Helen, and Sylvia is chasing after Frank. During the chase, while constantly changing places on the two cars and two cabs involved, and while eluding a zealous cop's attempts at stopping them, the three couples clarify their feelings for each other, and at the airport, Frank and Sylvia reconcile and depart for Fiji, Rudy and Gretchen console themselves with a trip together to Hawaii, and Helen forgives Bob, who has already found a new job with Dirt magazine, and the two of them fly to Las Vegas to marry.

== Cast ==
- Tony Curtis as Bob Weston, managing editor of Stop magazine
- Natalie Wood as Dr. Helen Brown, psychologist and author of Sex and the Single Girl
- Henry Fonda as Frank Broderick, owner of a stocking manufacturing firm, Bob's friend
- Lauren Bacall as Sylvia Broderick, Frank's wife
- Mel Ferrer as Rudy DeMeyer, psychiatrist, Helen's colleague
- Fran Jeffries as Gretchen, Bob's girlfriend
- Leslie Parrish as Susan, Bob's secretary
- Edward Everett Horton as the chief of Stop magazine
- Larry Storch as the motorcycle cop
- Stubby Kaye as Helen's cabbie
- Otto Kruger as Dr. Anderson
- Barbara Bouchet as photographer at the anniversary party (uncredited)

== Awards ==
Award	Category	Subject	Result
Laurel Awards	Top Female Comedy Performance	Natalie Wood	5th

== Reaction ==
The film was a box-office success and one of the top 20 highest-grossing films of 1964. The Time Out Film Guide 2009 described the film as a "coyly leering comedy ... graceless stuff, criminally wasting Bacall and Fonda as a couple with marital problems ... with Quine's moderate flair for comedy nowhere in evidence" and, according to Halliwell's Film & Video Guide, with "noise substituting for wit and style". On the review aggregator website Rotten Tomatoes, 50% of 6 critics' reviews are positive.
