= Ronald Rood =

Ronald Rood (July 7, 1920- July 16, 2001) was a Vermont author, naturalist and Vermont Public Radio commentator who wrote over 30 books, including The Loon in My Bathtub, How Do You Spank a Porcupine?, It's Going to Sting Me, and Mother Can I Keep This Clam - It Followed Me Home.

Ron Rood's Vermont: A Nature Guide was published by The New England Press in 1988.

== Personal life ==
Rood was born in Torrington, Connecticut, in 1920. He was intrigued by all of nature from early childhood, stating that his mentor was Thornton Burgess. During the Second World War, Rood was a fighter pilot, flying P-51 Mustangs over Europe. He earned a bachelor's degree in forestry and wildlife, and later a master's degree in zoology. He married Margaret "Peg" Bruce in 1942 and in 1953 they moved to Lincoln, Vermont, where he shared a home with his wife and their four children. Their friends Al and Norene Thergesen and their children also shared the home for some years. Rood taught the Introductory Biology Laboratory course at Middlebury College, collected biological specimens for biological supply houses, and wrote encyclopedia entries on various biological subjects while beginning his writing career. Rood taught Sunday School at the Lincoln United Church and directed its choir for 25 years.

Ronald Rood and his family lived for a while in Massapequa Park, New York, where he was an important part of the Massapequa Presbyterian Church. He and his wife, Peggy, both sang in the choir.

== Partial bibliography ==
- Wild Brother
- The How and Why Wonder Book of Insects (1960)
- Land Alive (1962)
- The How and Why Wonder Book: Ants & Bees (1962)
- The How and Why Wonder Book: Butterflies & Moths (1963)
- Loon in My Bathtub (1964)
- The Sea and Its Wonderful Creatures (1965)
- Bees Bugs & Beetles (1965)
- Vermont Life Book of Nature (1967)
- Hundred Acre Welcome: The Story of a Chincoteague Pony (1967)
- Animal Champions (1969)
- Answers About Insects (1969)
- Animals Nobody Loves (1971)
- Wild Brother (1971)
- Who Wakes the Groundhog? (1973)
- May I Keep this Clam, Mother? It Followed Me Home (1973)
- Good Things are Happening (1975)
- Possum in the Parking Lot (1977)
- It's Going to Sting Me! (1977)
- Elephant Bones and Lonely Hearts (1977)
- Laska (1980)
- Insects (1982)
- Ron Rood's Vermont (1988)
- Tide Pools (1993)
- Wetlands (1994)
- New York Public Library Incredible Earth (1996)
- How Do You Spank a Porcupine?
- Beachcombers All!

== See also ==
- How and Why Wonder Books
