= David R. Slavitt =

American poet and author (1935–2025)

David Rytman Slavitt (March 23, 1935 – May 17, 2025) was an American writer, poet and translator, who was author of more than 100 books.

Slavitt wrote a number of novels and numerous translations of classical literature from Greek, Latin, and other languages. He also wrote a number of popular erotic novels under the pseudonym Henry Sutton, starting in the late 1960s. The Exhibitionist (1967) was a bestseller and sold over four million copies. He has also published popular novels under the names of David Benjamin, Lynn Meyer, and Henry Lazarus. His first work, a book of poems titled Suits for the Dead, was published in 1961. He worked as a writer and film critic for Newsweek from 1958 to 1965. In 2011, he joined the "100 Club": writers who have published, or contracted for, 100 books.

According to Henry S. Taylor, winner of the 1986 Pulitzer Prize for Poetry, "David Slavitt is among the most accomplished living practitioners" of writing, "in both prose and verse; his poems give us a pleasurable, beautiful way of meditating on a bad time. We can't ask much more of literature, and usually we get far less." Novelist and poet James Dickey wrote, "Slavitt has such an easy, tolerant, believable relationship with the ancient world and its authors that making the change-over from that world to ours is less a leap than an enjoyable stroll. The reader feels a continual sense of gratitude." The New York Times called him "a protean performer who functions at several levels."

== Career ==
=== Writing career ===
Before becoming a full-time freelance writer in 1965, Slavitt worked at various jobs in the literary field. These included a stint in the personnel office of Reader's Digest in Pleasantville, New York; teaching English at the Georgia Institute of Technology in Atlanta (1957–1958); and a variety of jobs at Newsweek in New York. Slavitt began there as a mailroom clerk, was promoted to the positions of book reviewer and film critic, and earned the position of associate editor from 1958 to 1963. He edited the movie news and reviews pages from 1963 to 1965.

Okla Elliott, a professor and Illinois Distinguished Fellow at the University of Illinois at Urbana–Champaign, wrote of Slavitt that he "served as an associate editor at Newsweek until 1965, teaching himself Greek on his 35-minute commute. In his last two years at Newsweek, he had a reputation as an astute, sometime cranky, but always readable 'flicker picker' and gained some notoriety for his film reviews there."

Slavitt taught as an assistant professor at the University of Maryland, College Park, in 1977, and at Temple University in Philadelphia, as associate professor from 1978 to 1980. Slavitt was a lecturer at Columbia University from 1985 to 1986, at Rutgers University in 1987, and at the University of Pennsylvania in 1991. He served as a visiting professor at the University of Texas at El Paso and other institutions. He has given poetry readings at colleges and universities, at the Folger Shakespeare Library, and at the Library of Congress.

In the 1960s, Slavitt was approached by Bernie Geis & Associates to write an erotic novel, which he agreed to if he could use a pseudonym. As Henry Sutton, in 1967 he published The Exhibitionist, which sold more than 4 million copies. He followed this with The Voyeur in 1968 and three more novels as Henry Sutton. In the 1970s, he also used the pen names of Lynn Meyer and Henry Lazarus for novels written for the popular market.

Slavitt has published numerous classical works in translation, from Greek, Latin, Hebrew, Spanish and French literature.

=== Politics ===
In 2004, Slavitt unsuccessfully ran as a Republican for a seat in the Massachusetts House of Representatives, losing to longtime incumbent Timothy J. Toomey Jr. His campaign manager was former Cambridge School Committee candidate and Republican City Committee Chairman Fred Baker. He explored the race in his 2006 non-fiction book Blue State Blues: How a Cranky Conservative Launched a Campaign and Found Himself the Liberal Candidate (And Still Lost). Jonathan Yardley, reviewing the book, said that Slavitt "was challenged by his son Evan -- a Republican activist" to run, and that Slavitt described himself as "economically conservative and socially moderate."

== Personal life ==
Slavitt was born in White Plains, New York, on March 23, 1935, the son of lawyer Samuel Saul Slavitt and Adele Beatrice Slavitt, a paralegal.

Slavitt attended Phillips Academy in Andover, Massachusetts, where his first writing teacher was Dudley Fitts. He received an undergraduate degree from Yale University (where he studied under Cleanth Brooks and Robert Penn Warren and was elected class poet, "Scholar of the House," in 1956), graduating with a Bachelor of Arts (magna cum laude), and then a Master's degree in English from Columbia University in 1957.

He was married to Lynn Nita Meyer on August 27, 1956. They had three children: Evan Meyer, Sarah Rebecca, and Joshua Rytman; while raising their young children, the Slavitts lived for some years in Miami, Florida. His son Josh attended grade school with Fiona Kelleghan. Slavitt and his first wife were divorced on December 20, 1977.

Slavitt's Florida house was burgled during the summer of 1973. His family were no longer happy to live in Miami; they moved to live in Cambridge, Massachusetts. For a short time he lived in Belmont. He then met Janet Lee Abrahm, later to be Professor of Medicine at Harvard Medical School, and they were married on April 16, 1978. Abrahm was appointed Chief Resident at Moffitt Hospital of University of California, San Francisco, where they lived for a year. Together, they moved to Philadelphia, where Abrahm had earned a fellowship; they moved to Boston in 2000, when she was hired at Harvard University.

Slavitt's mother was murdered in 1982 by a teenaged burglar, who was convicted and imprisoned. Slavitt's poetry became darker, by his own admission.

The Slavitts are a close-knit family; he said proudly in a 2011 interview: "What amazes me is not the 100 books, but the fact that I am 76 and have nine grandchildren." He and Janet lived in Cambridge, Massachusetts.

He and his first wife are Jewish and raised their children in that faith.

Slavitt died on May 17, 2025, at the age of 90.

== Bibliography ==
Title	Year	Publisher	Notes
A Cheater's Dozen: Eleven Poems	1952	Self-published	Slavitt wrote and distributed these poems by mimeograph at age 17, at Andover. Held in the Rare Books and Manuscripts Dept. of Houghton Library at Harvard University.
Suits For the Dead	1961	Scribner	Poetry. (Scribner series: Poets of today, vol. 8)
The Carnivore	1965	University of North Carolina Press	Poetry. Pulitzer Prize for Poetry winner Henry S. Taylor praises one poem, Elegy for Walter Stone, as one of Slavitt's "most ambitious."
Rochelle, or, Virtue Rewarded	1966	Chapman & Hall	A novel. Printed in the United States by Delacorte Press in 1967.
The Exhibitionist	1967	Bernard Geis Associates	An erotic novel about "a prominent actress and her prominent father," written under the name Henry Sutton.
King Saul	1967	The American Place Theatre	A play.
The Voyeur	1968	Bernard Geis Associates	An erotic novel, written under the name Henry Sutton. Advertised with a New York Times Square billboard, a first in New York book promotions.
Feel Free	1968	Delacorte Press	Novel.
Day Sailing and Other Poems	1969	University of North Carolina Press	Poetry.
The Cardinal Sins	1969	The Playwright's Unit	A play.
Anagrams	1970	Hodder & Stoughton	Novel.
Vector	1970	Bernard Geis Associates	Science fiction medical disaster novel, written as by Henry Sutton. Reprinted by Hodder & Stoughton in 1971 (ISBN 0-340-15068-8) and by Coronet Books in 1972 (ISBN 0-340-16071-3).
Eclogues of Virgil	1971	Doubleday	Translated from the Latin, the Eclogues of Virgil.
A B C D: A Novel	1972	Doubleday	Novel. ISBN 0-385-03634-5.
The Eclogues and the Georgics of Virgil	1972	Doubleday	Translated from the Latin, the Eclogues and Georgics of Virgil.
Child's Play	1972	Louisiana State University Press	Poetry. ISBN 0-8071-0238-5.
The Outer Mongolian	1973	Doubleday	Alternate history novel ISBN 0-385-00425-7.
The Liberated	1973	Doubleday	Novel. Written as by Henry Sutton.
The Killing of the King	1974	Doubleday / W.H. Allen	Biographical novel about Farouk of Egypt. ISBN 0-385-07899-4.
Vital Signs: New and Selected Poems	1975	Doubleday	
Paperback Thriller	1975	Avon	A mystery novel, written under the pseudonym Lynn Meyer. Honors: Edgar Award Nominee for Best First Novel (1976). ISBN 0-380-31336-7.
King of Hearts	1976	Arbor House	Novel. ISBN 0-87795-153-5.
That Golden Woman	1976	Fawcett Publications	Novel, written as Henry Lazarus. ISBN 0-449-13518-7.
Understanding Social Life: An Introduction to Social Psychology	1976	McGraw-Hill	Co-authored with Paul F. Secord and Carl W. Backman, a treatise on social psychology.
Jo Stern	1978	Harper & Row	Novel. ISBN 978-0-06-013994-0.
The Sacrifice: A Novel of the Occult	1978	Grosset & Dunlap	Novel, written as Henry Sutton. ISBN 0-448-14719-X. Reprinted by Charter in 1979 (ISBN 0-441-74610-1) and by Sphere Books in 1980 (ISBN 0-7221-8290-2).
Rounding the Horn	1978	Louisiana State University Press	Poetry.
The Idol	1979	Putnam	A novel about Hollywood, written under the pseudonym David Benjamin.
Cold Comfort	1980	Methuen Publishing	Novel.
The Proposal	1980	Charter Books	An erotic novel about swinging, written as by Henry Sutton.
Dozens	1981	Louisiana State University Press	ISBN 0-8071-0787-5.
Ringer	1982	E. P. Dutton	Novel
Big Nose	1983	Louisiana State University Press	
Alice at 80	1984	Doubleday	Novel ISBN 978-1-937402-23-5. ISBN 0-385-18883-8.
The Elegies to Delia of Albius Tibillus	1985	Bits Press	Translation of the Latin poetry of Tibullus.
The Agent	1986	Doubleday	Novel co-authored with Bill Adler. ISBN 0-385-23007-9.
The Walls of Thebes	1986	Louisiana State University Press	Poetry. ISBN 978-0-8071-1306-6.
The Tristia of Ovid	1986	Bellflower Press	Translation ISBN 0-934958-04-1.
The Cock Book, or, The Child's First Book of Pornography	1987	Bits Press	
The Hussar	1987	Louisiana State University Press	Novel. ISBN 0-8071-1364-6.
Physicians Observed	1987	Doubleday Religious Publishing Group	Non-fiction. ISBN 9780819568069
Salazar Blinks	1988	Atheneum	Novel. ISBN 0-689-12030-3.
Equinox and Other Poems	1989	Louisiana State University Press	Poetry. ISBN 0-8071-1485-5.
Ovid's Poetry of Exile	1989	Johns Hopkins University Press	A collection of epistolary poems translated from the Latin of Ovid.
Lives of the Saints	1990	Atheneum	Novel. ISBN 0-689-12079-6.
Eight Longer Poems	1990	Louisiana State University Press	Poetry.
Short Stories Are Not Real Life	1991	Louisiana State University Press	Short story collection. ISBN 978-0-8071-1665-4.
Virgil	1992	Yale University Press	Analyses of Virgil's poems.
Seneca: The Tragedies, Volume I	1992	Johns Hopkins University Press	Translated from the Latin plays about classical mythology by Seneca the Younger.
Turkish Delights	1993	Louisiana State University Press	Novel. ISBN 978-0-8071-1813-9.
The Fables of Avianus	1993	Johns Hopkins University Press	Translations of 42 fables by Avianus. ISBN 0-8018-4684-6.
Crossroads	1994	Louisiana State University Press	Poetry. ISBN 0-8071-1753-6.
The Metamorphoses of Ovid	1994	Johns Hopkins University Press	English verse translation of Ovid's Metamorphoses.
The Cliff	1994	Louisiana State University Press	Novel. ISBN 978-0-8071-1781-1.
Seneca: The Tragedies, Volume II	1995	Johns Hopkins University Press	Translation of five tragedies by Seneca the Younger.
A Gift: The Life of Da Ponte	1996	Louisiana State University Press	A poetical biography of Lorenzo Da Ponte. ISBN 978-0-8071-2047-7.
Hymns of Prudentius: The Cathemerinon, or, The Daily Round	1996	Johns Hopkins University Press	Translation of Prudentius' Cathemerinon Liber.
Sixty-One Psalms of David	1996	Oxford University Press	Translation of the Psalms of David from Hebrew. ISBN 0-19-510711-X.
Epic and Epigram: Two Elizabethan Entertainments	1997	Louisiana State University Press	Free-form translations from the Latin epigrams of Welsh poet John Owen. Includes Duessa's version: a dirge in seven canticles. ISBN 0-8071-2151-7.
Broken Columns: Two Roman Epic Fragments	1997	University of Pennsylvania Press	Translations of The Achilleid (Achilleis) by Publius Papinius Statius and The Rape of Proserpine (De raptu Proserpinae) by Claudius Claudianus. ISBN 0-8122-3424-3.
Epinician Odes and Dithyrambs of Bacchylides	1998	University of Pennsylvania Press	Translation of the Bacchylides. ISBN 0-8122-3447-2.
PS3569.L3	1998	Louisiana State University Press	Poetry.
Solomon Ibn Gabirol's A Crown For the King	1998	Oxford University Press	Translation of Solomon ibn Gabirol's poem. ISBN 0-19-511962-2.
Three Amusements of Ausonius	1998	University of Pennsylvania Press	Translation of three epigrams by Ausonius. ISBN 0-8122-3472-3. Paperback ISBN 978-0-8122-1953-1.
The Oresteia of Aeschylus	1999	University of Pennsylvania Press	Translation.
The Poem of Queen Esther by Joao Pinto Delgado	1999	Oxford University Press	Translation of a Spanish 16th century poem ISBN 0-19-512374-3.
Get Thee to a Nunnery: Two Shakespearean Divertimentos	1999	Catbird Press	Novella.
The Voyage of the Argo: The Argonautica of Gaius Valerius Flaccus	1999	Johns Hopkins University Press	Translation
The Book of the Twelve Prophets	2000	Oxford University Press	Translation of a book from the Hebrew Bible ISBN 0-19-513214-9.
The Latin Odes of Jean Dorat	2000	Orchises	Translated from the French of Jean Daurat. ISBN 0-914061-80-1.
Falling From Silence: Poems	2001	Louisiana State University Press	Poetry.
The Book of Lamentations: a Meditation and Translation	2001	Johns Hopkins University Press	Poetry. ISBN 0-8018-6617-0.
Sonnets of Love and Death of Jean de Sponde	2001	Northwestern University Press	Translation
Propertius In Love: The Elegies	2002	University of California Press	Translation.
Poems of Manuel Bandeira	2002	Sheep Meadow Press	Translation.
Aspects of the Novel: A Novel	2003	Catbird	ISBN 0-945774-56-7.
The Phoenix and Other Translations	2004	New American Press	Translations from Latin, French, and Sanskrit.
The Regrets of Joachim du Bellay	2004	Northwestern University Press	Translation of sonnets by Joachim du Bellay.
Re Verse: Essays on Poets and Poetry	2005	Northwestern University Press	
Change of Address: Poems, New and Selected	2006	Louisiana State University Press	Poetry.
Blue State Blues: How a Conservative Launched a Campaign and Found Himself The Liberal Candidate (And Still Lost)	2006	Wesleyan University Press	Memoir.
William Henry Harrison and Other Poems	2006	Louisiana State University Press	Poetry.
The Theban plays of Sophocles	2007	Yale University Press	Translation.
De Rerum Natura = The Nature of Things : a Poetic Translation	2008	University of California Press	Translation.
The Consolation of Philosophy	2008	Harvard University Press	Translation from the Latin of Boethius.
The Seven Deadly Sins and Other Poems	2009	Louisiana State University Press	Poetry.
Orlando Furioso: a new verse translation	2009	Belknap Press, Harvard Univ. Press	Translation of the poem by Ludovico Ariosto.
George Sanders, Zsa Zsa, and Me: Essays on the Movies	2009	Northwestern University Press	Memoir.
The Latin Eclogues	2010	Johns Hopkins University Press	Translation of the eclogues by Giovanni Boccaccio. ISBN 978-0-8018-9562-3.
La Vita Nuova	2010	Harvard University Press	Translation of poetry by Dante Alighieri.
Poems From The Greek Anthology	2010	Sheep Meadow Press	Translations of Greek poems.
Milton's Latin Poems	2011	Johns Hopkins University Press	Translations of the Latin poems by John Milton.
The Gnat and Other Poems of the Appendix Virgiliana	2011	University of California Press	Translations of some poems attributed to Virgil. ISBN 0-520-26765-6.
The Duke's Man	2011	Northwestern University Press	Historical novel. ISBN 978-0-8101-2700-5.
Love Poems, Letters, and Remedies of Ovid	2011	Harvard University Press	Translations.
Sonnets and Shorter Poems	2012	Harvard University Press	Translations from Petrarch.
The Metabolism of Desire: The Poems of Guido Cavalcanti	2012	Athabasca University	Translated poetry. ISBN 978-1-926836-84-3.
Overture	2012	Outpost19	Novel. ISBN 978-1-937402-22-8
The Crooning Wind: Three Greenlandic Poets	2012	New American Press	Translations from the Greenland poets Torkilk Mørch, Gerda Hvisterdahl, and Innunquaq Larsen, by Nive Grønkjær and David Slavitt.
The Dhammapada of the Buddha	2012		
Procne	2012	Outpost19	Translation of the drama by Gregorio Correr (1409–1464)
Bottom of the Barrel: The Herring Poems	2012	Outpost19	Poetry.
L'Heure bleu	2013	Broadkill River Press	ISBN 978-0-9837789-1-2.
The Lays of Marie de France	2013	Athabasca University	Poetry.
Civil Wars: Poems	2013	Louisiana State University Press	Poetry. ISBN 978-0-8071-5180-8.
The Other Four Plays of Sophocles: Ajax, Women of Trachis, Electra, and Philoctetes	2013	The Johns Hopkins University Press	Translations of the tragedies Ajax, Women of Trachis, Electra, and Philoctetes.
Odes	2014	University of Wisconsin Press	Translations from Horace.
Shiksa	2014	C&R Press	
From the Fragrant East by Pietro Bembo	2014	Miracolo	Translation of Pietro Bembo.
The Jungle Poems of Leconte de Lisle	2014	New American Press	Poetry.
Walloomsac: A Week on the River, a.k.a. Walloomsac: A Roman Fleuve	2014	Anaphora Literary Press	Novel. ISBN 978-1-937536-90-9.
Opus Posthumous and Other Poems	2021	Louisiana State University Press	Poetry. ISBN 978-0-80717-566-8.

== Adaptations ==
- Metamorphoses – Director, Mary Zimmerman; Repertory Theatre; St. Louis, Missouri; 2003.
- Trojan Women – Directors, Heidi Winters Vogel and Tom Martin; Saint Louis University Theatre; St. Louis, Missouri; 2005.
- Oedipus King – Director, Philip Boehm; Kranzberg Arts Center / Gaslight Theater, St. Louis, Missouri; 2010.
- Antigone – Director, Philip Boehm; Upstream Theater, St. Louis, Missouri; 2014.

== Critical reception ==
Henry S. Taylor, winner of the 1986 Pulitzer Prize for Poetry, wrote in 1992:

It has been twenty-five years since David R. Slavitt invented Henry Sutton and embarked on a series of schlock novels under that pseudonym, but it is still fun to recall people's outrage when they learned that The Exhibitionist was the work of someone who had also written more serious fiction, and even poetry. On one hand, people of Jacqueline Susann's ilk were irritated because someone had done easily and laughingly what they worked hard to do; on the other hand, purveyors of solemn literature were offended at the success of this prostitution of talent. Even Tom Wolfe, who had no reason to feel either envious or superior, took a cheap shot at Slavitt's next serious novel, saying in a review that it was not as good as The Exhibitionist.

Taylor adds:

From the beginning, Slavitt's poetry has been characterized by profound wit, neoclassical attention to form, and generous erudition. Slavitt is also a master of tonal variety; within the same poem he can make shifts of tone that most poets would find too risky. ... Part of his success lies in his ability to deal with formal restrictions that are too much for most poets; though his stanza forms are often intricate, they never prevent, or even impede, the explorations of a mind that takes suggestions as they come, weaving them into the pattern.

R. H. W. Dillard, a noted critic at Hollins University, writes, "David Slavitt is one of the most prodigious writers working today. In book after book after book after book after book, he engages, amuses, delights, shocks, astounds, annoys, rouses, arouses, and generally awakens readers from the torpor that the works of too many (unnamed here) writers have cast them into."

In a lengthy review of Orlando Furioso: A New Verse Translation, critic Steve Baker writes admiringly that

David R. Slavitt has been playing fast and loose with the literary classics since the early 70s when he brought us free adaptations of the Eclogues and Georgics of Virgil, both of which present the original masterworks as filtered through – to put it in his words – the "radically improvisational" lens of the translator. In fact, Slavitt openly refers to these early works not as translations per se, but rather as "verse essays", in which he riffs playfully on the original texts. As renderings into English of Virgil's Latin, his translations of both the Eclogues and the Georgics represent an act of reading, a lively engagement with the original poems, as he transposes them from the distant and antique to the conversational and everyday. They do more to escort us through a reading of the poems than they do to present us with the original texts to read on our own. Shot through with the translator's commentary, dominated by paraphrase and dressed with satirical discussions of the propositional content of the originals, Slavitt's creations are not translations in any traditional sense. In bringing the uninitiated into uniquely colloquial contact with these timeless classics, they do, however, actually amount to pleasantly entertaining romps with the bucolic Virgil."

The Cliff (1994), Slavitt's novel about an impostor (one John Smith pretending to be another, more revered professor of the same name) at a literary retreat in Italy, received praise from many quarters. Publishers Weekly's reviewer wrote, "Smith's witty and playful narration entertains despite some conveniences in the plot. It is his attempt to retain a sense of basic human dignity, however - his desire to prove that he is not 'an altogether worthless person' - that lies at the heart of the novel and invests it with meaning and resonance." Georgia Jones-Davis, writing for the Los Angeles Times, speculated that "Slavitt is not so much telling a story as using his narrative to spoof everything he's probably come across in his distinguished and, let's face it, long academic career." She added, "There are some wondrously funny moments. Our brilliant, moody, schlemiel of a narrator, a guy who can't even make his rent, is highly critical of the food served at this historic villa. ... The narrator's sincere attempts to reconcile with his alienated daughter are touching and not at all sentimental. The highlight of the book must be the narrator's scathing letter to the manager about the villa's terrible service and dismissive treatment of its guests." Magill Book Reviews wrote, "Slavitt's fiftieth book offers a satiric look at the cosseted world of creative and scholarly retreats, their beneficiaries, staffs, and administrators, as well as creative and academic life more generally."

His two science fiction novels were well-received. Vector, a 1970 public health thriller about the accidental spillage of a nerve gas causing viral encephalitis and wiping out a small Utah town, was called "an efficient, energetic novel tracking a common concern." The Outer Mongolian (1973) is an alternate history novel about a genius child with Down syndrome, who manipulates 1970s politics so that Richard M. Nixon will become the President and end the Vietnam War. Science fiction scholar Arthur D. Hlavaty wrote in The New York Review of Science Fiction that it was the best of Slavitt's novels under his own name, praising its "much wit and pathos." Kirkus Reviews wrote that Slavitt "managed to parlay medical sport into contemporary satire with geniality and casual bravura." The New York Times called The Outer Mongolian a "slight but springy entertainment" and a "nicely‐timed series of escalating capers," made up of "a number of political crotchets and a generous dollop of cynicism."

== Awards and honors ==
- Edgar Award Nominee for Best First Novel for Paperback Thriller, 1976
- Grant from Pennsylvania Council on the Arts, 1985
- National Endowment for the Arts Translation Fellowship, 1988
- Literature award, American Academy of Arts and Letters, 1989
- Rockefeller Foundation artist's residency, 1989. Slavitt used the time period of the retreat (November 3 - December 12, 1989) to work on a translation of the curse poem Ibis by the Latin poet Ovid.
- Kevin Kline Award, 2011, for Outstanding New Play or Musical: David Slavitt, translator (Oedipus King, Upstream Theater, St. Louis, Missouri)
