= Blockhead! =

Tabletop stacking game using colorful wooden blocks

Blockhead! game, 1954 edition

Blockhead! is a simple tabletop game suitable for children four years of age or older. It was invented in 1952 by G.W. "Jerry" D'Arcey and developed by G.W. and Alice D'Arcey in San Jose, California. Originally consisting of 20 brightly colored wooden blocks of varying shapes, the object of the game is to add blocks to a tower without having it collapse on your turn.

== Rules ==
The first player sets one of the blocks on a flat surface; this is the only block allowed to touch the base. Each player then takes turns adding a single block until the tower collapses. The player that knocks over the tower on their turn loses. A player who loses three times is eliminated. The last player remaining wins.

Blockhead! uses slang terms with a block theme: A player who has lost once is called a "square"; a player who has lost twice is a "character"; a player who loses three times and is eliminated is a "blockhead".

== History ==
Cover of the 1954 square box edition

The game was first published by G.W. "Jerry" D'Arcey in 1952. In 1954 Saalfield Publishing Company released the first 25-block version of the game. The design of the blocks has remained consistent through each edition, the only change being modifying the yellow “double hump” to be more heart-shaped. Currently, the game is produced by Pressman Toy Corporation.

=== Editions ===
- 1952: G.W.D'Arcey square box
- 1954: Saalfield tall box #7563
- 1954: Saalfield square box #7563
- 1969: Saalfield Executive Edition #6163
- 1969: Saalfield Giant Edition #7625
- 1975-76: Parker Brothers
- 1982: Pressman
- 1992: Pressman Super Blockhead! - 30 Pieces
- 2001: Pressman Cylindrical Box
- Current: Pressman

Blockhead! was voted into Games Magazine's Hall of Fame and appears on the GAMES 100 list.

== Reception ==
Games included Blockhead in their "Top 100 Games of 1982", calling the game "Very addictive" and declaring that "We know of no better equalizer of children and adults, game fanatics and non-gamers."

== Reviews ==
- 1983 Games 100

== See also ==
- Jenga, another stacking game
