= Mikado (game) =

Pick-up sticks game

Mikado is a pick-up sticks game of European origin, played with a set of same-length sticks which can measure between 17 and 20 cm (6.7 and 7.9 in). One of the oldest preserved sets of Mikado game sticks dates back to the 17th century. The game's origins are likely Eastern, as evidenced by the existence of preserved game sets from that region.

In Colonial America, the game was first called Jackstraws, and later named in the US as pick-up sticks. This term is not very specific in respect to existing stick game variations. The "Mikado" name may have been avoided because it was a brand name of a game producer. The game is named for the highest scoring (blue) stick "Mikado (Emperor of Japan)" .

== Rules ==
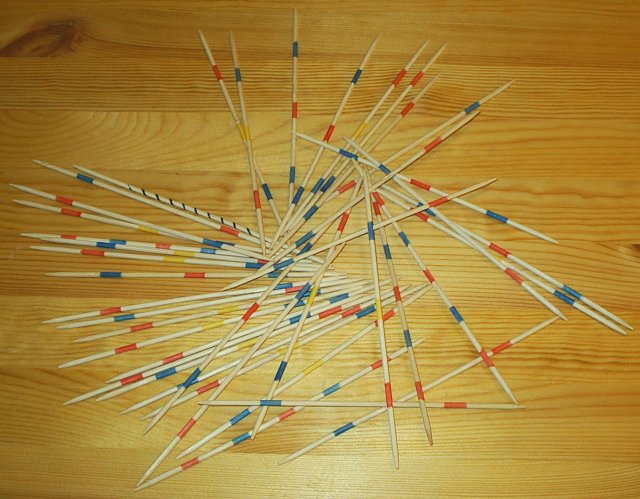
Mikado sticks

Classic Mikado consists of 41 sticks, coded with different values that have a total of 170 points and are around 15 cm long.

| Name | Traditional wood type | Coding | Point value | Number of sticks |
|---|---|---|---|---|
| Mikado | walnut | blue | 20 pts | 1 |
| Mandarin | cherry | yellow/black, middle wide two narrow stripes on the ends | 10 pts | 5 |
| Bonzen (jp. bouzu) | oak | orange, five stripes | 5 pts | 5 |
| Samurai | beech | green, three stripes | 3 pts | 15 |
| Kuli (cn. guli) / Worker | ash | red, two stripes | 2 pts | 15 |

The sticks are bundled and taken in one hand that touches the table or ground. The release creates a circular jumble. Now the players take turns, in which one stick after another should be taken up without moving or touching others. The take-away could be by hand, possibly through pressing on a stick's tip or if one has already picked up a special stick (Mikado/Mandarin), it could be used as a helper, possibly to throw up another stick.

On a fault the turn ends (the last stick taken is not counted). The next player bundles and drops the sticks again. After several rounds, normally five, the one with the highest score – the total of the values of the sticks picked up – is the winner.

A player is allowed to stand up on but not to leave their own place. A bad throw could be rerun and the rules should be kept strict in respect to moving sticks to enjoy the game.

== Rule variations ==
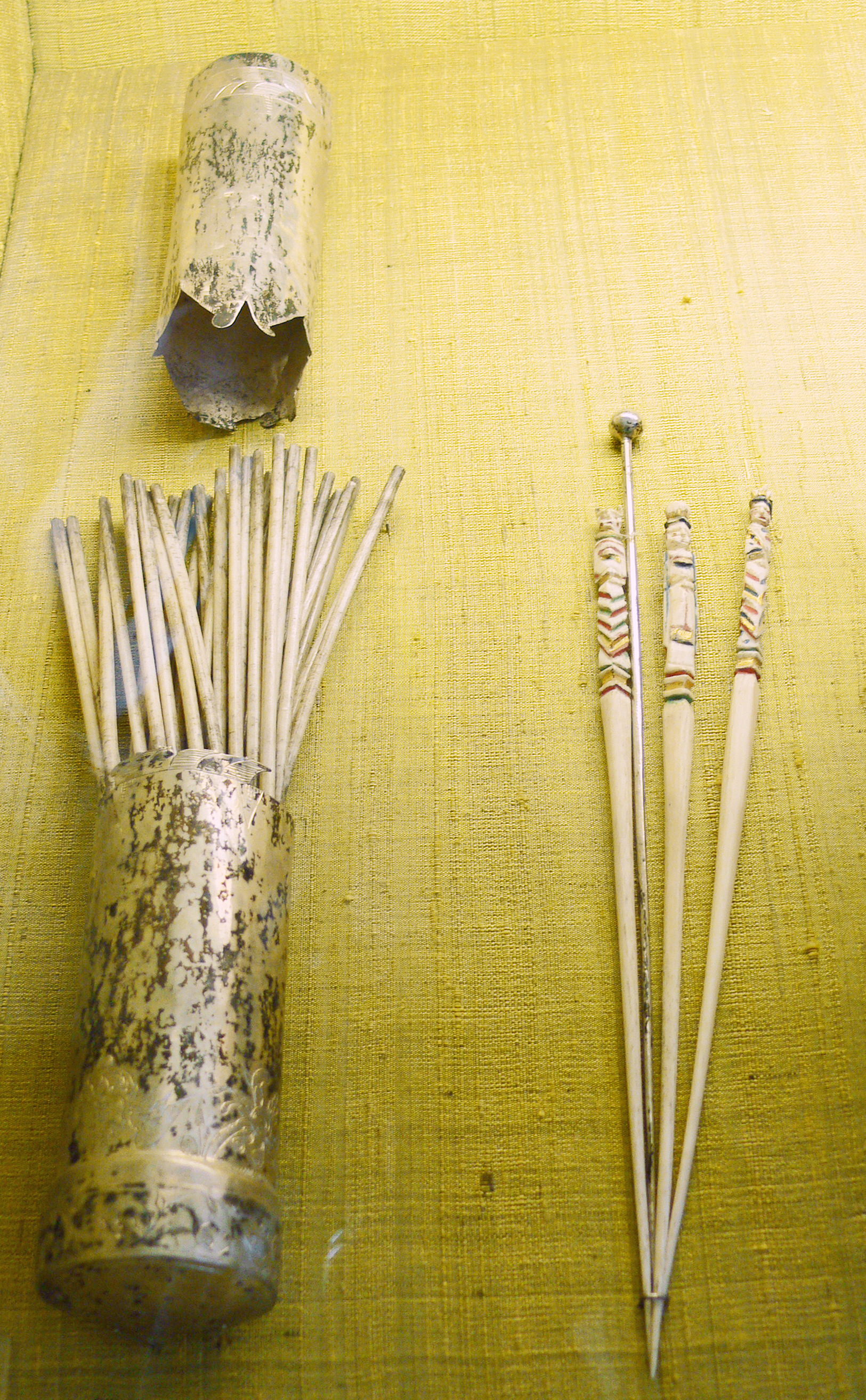
Mikado set from the 17th century

During a player's turn:

- the sticks are rebundled and dropped again (traditional);
- the stack is taken over as is from the previous player (casual);
- the person to the left of the player turn rebundles and drops the sticks for the player, thus eliminating the potential for a doctored drop.

Sticks allowed as pick-up helpers:

- Mikado (traditional);
- only the Mikado if the player has at least one of all other sticks (Kuli, Samurai, Bonzen, Mandarin);
- Mikado / Mandarin (simplified);
- Mikado / Mandarin / Bonzen (casual);
- any stick already picked up (very casual).

A stick taken when picking it up makes another stick in the stack move:

- is not added to the player's score and dropped back (stack take-over variant);
- is not added (traditional);
- is added to the player's score.

Scoring:

- the exact sequence of Kuli, Samurai, Bonzen and Mandarin may double the points of a turn;
- a player who does not use the correct helper may lose all points of the current turn.

== Types ==
=== Classic Mikado ===
Classic Mikado is typically made from beech wood.

Sizes:

- standard: length 17 centimetres (6.7 in), 1 millimetre (0.039 in) thick
- large: length 28 centimetres (11 in), 1 millimetre (0.039 in) thick
- super: length 50 centimetres (20 in), 8 millimetres (0.31 in) thick

The large and super variants may use the 26 sticks Giant Mikado variant.

=== Mini Mikado ===
Made of 31 toothpicks painted in the middle. The game has a total of 145 points. name / coding / value / number of the sticks:

- Mikado, 1 blue stripe, 20 points, 1 stick
- Mandarin, 3 yellow stripes, 10 points, 5 sticks
- Bonzen, 2 orange stripes, 5 points, 5 sticks
- Samurai, 3 green stripes, 3 points, 10 sticks
- Kuli, 2 red stripes, 2 points, 10 sticks

Rules and values are the same as with normal Mikado sticks.

=== Giant Mikado ===
This type is usually used for outdoor use. There are 26 sticks with a length of 93 centimetres (37 in) and 10 millimetres (0.39 in) diameter. The game has a total of 200 points.

| Name | Value | Number of the sticks |
|---|---|---|
| Mikado | 50 points | 1 stick |
| Mandarin | 10 points | 5 sticks |
| Samurai | 3 points | 10 sticks |
| Kuli | 2 points | 10 sticks |

Rules and markings are the same as with normal Mikado sticks.
