= Wonder Books =

Series of books produced in the 1930s and 1940s

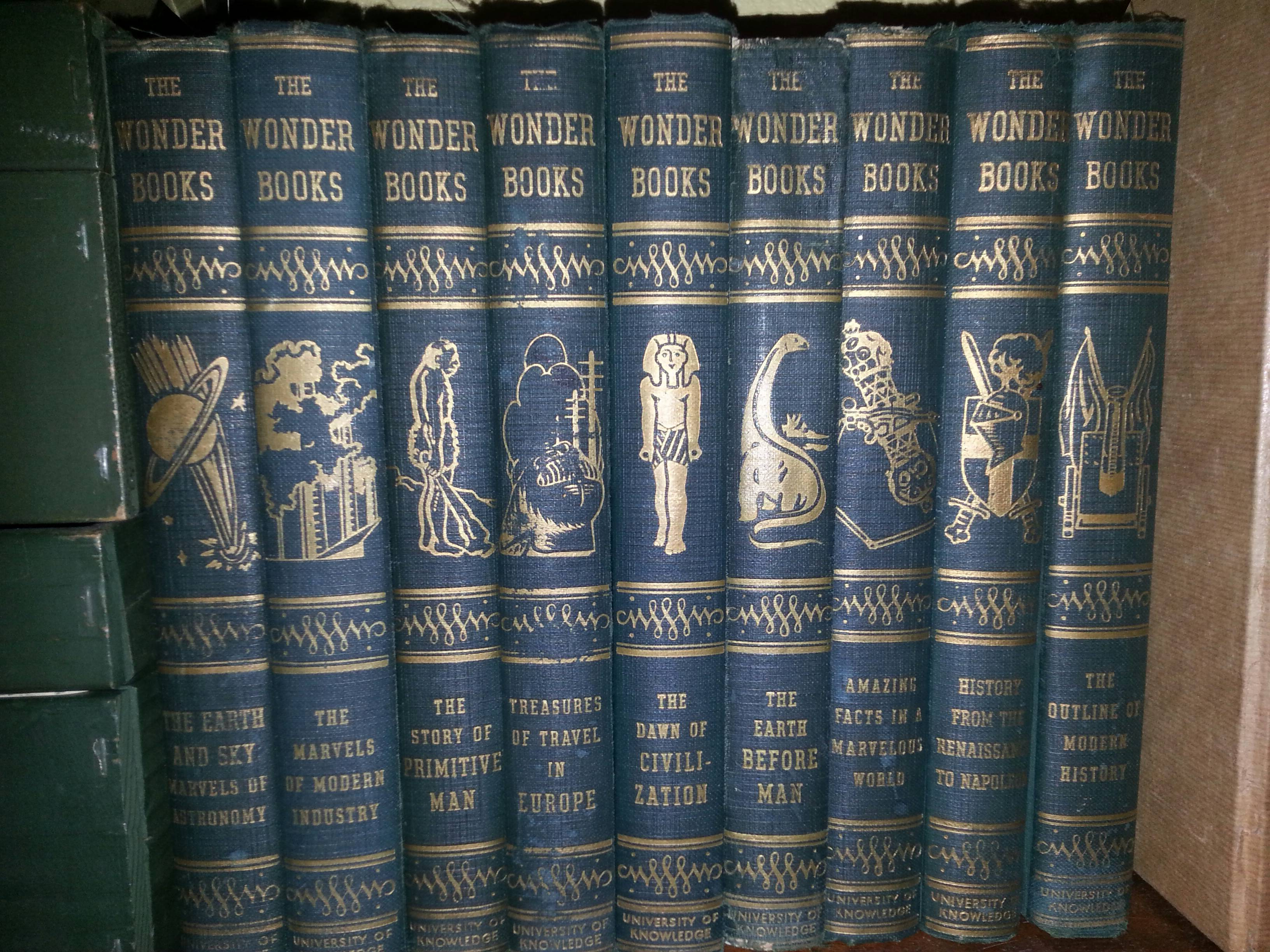
Some of the Wonder Books

The Wonder Books are a series of books produced in the United States in the 1930s and 1940s. It was published by the University of Knowledge Incorporated, editor-in-chief being Glenn Frank. It is not to be confused with the children's book imprint of Grosset & Dunlap.

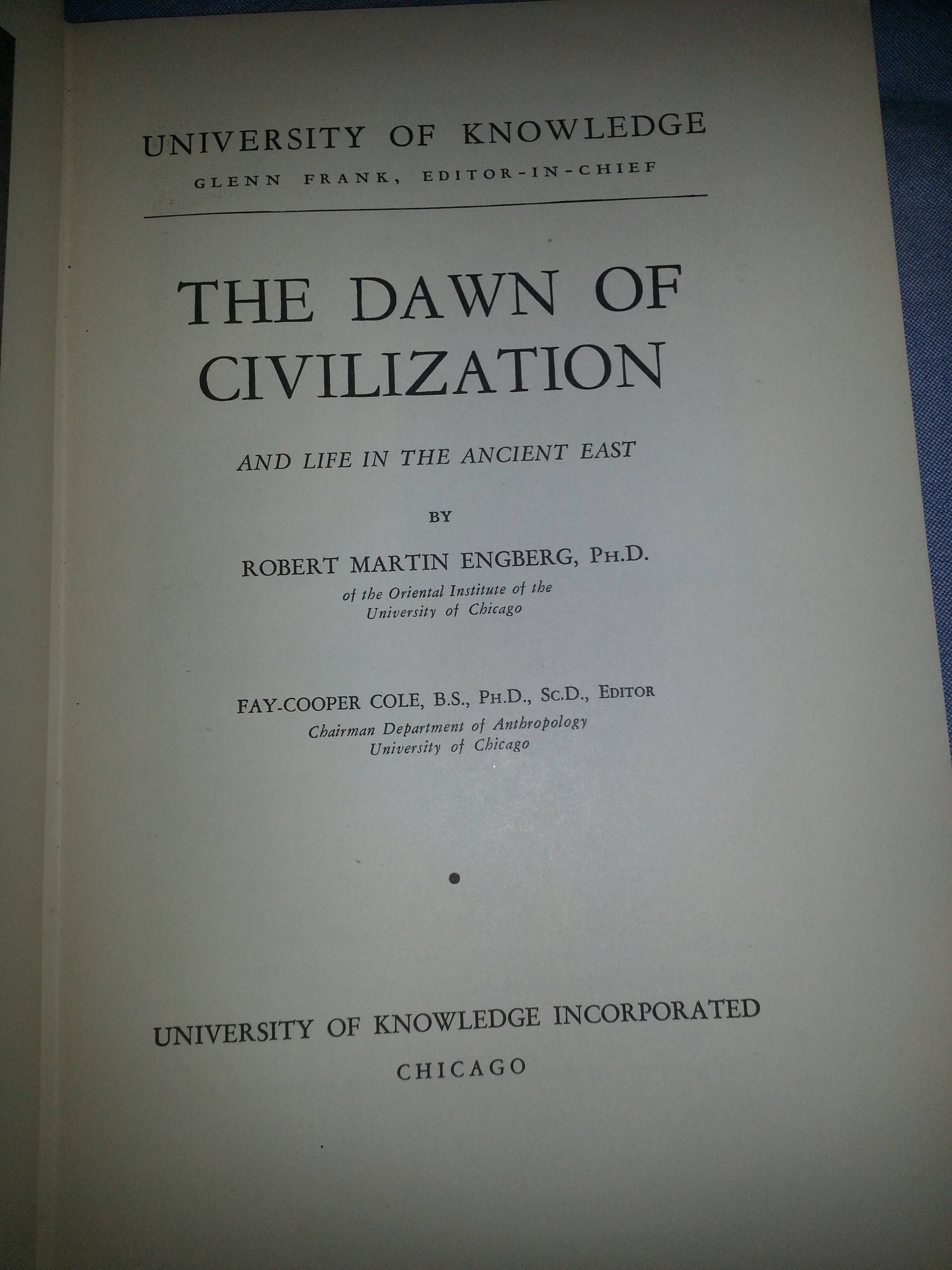
The title page of the "Dawn of Civilization" book in the Wonder Book series published by The University of Knowledge.

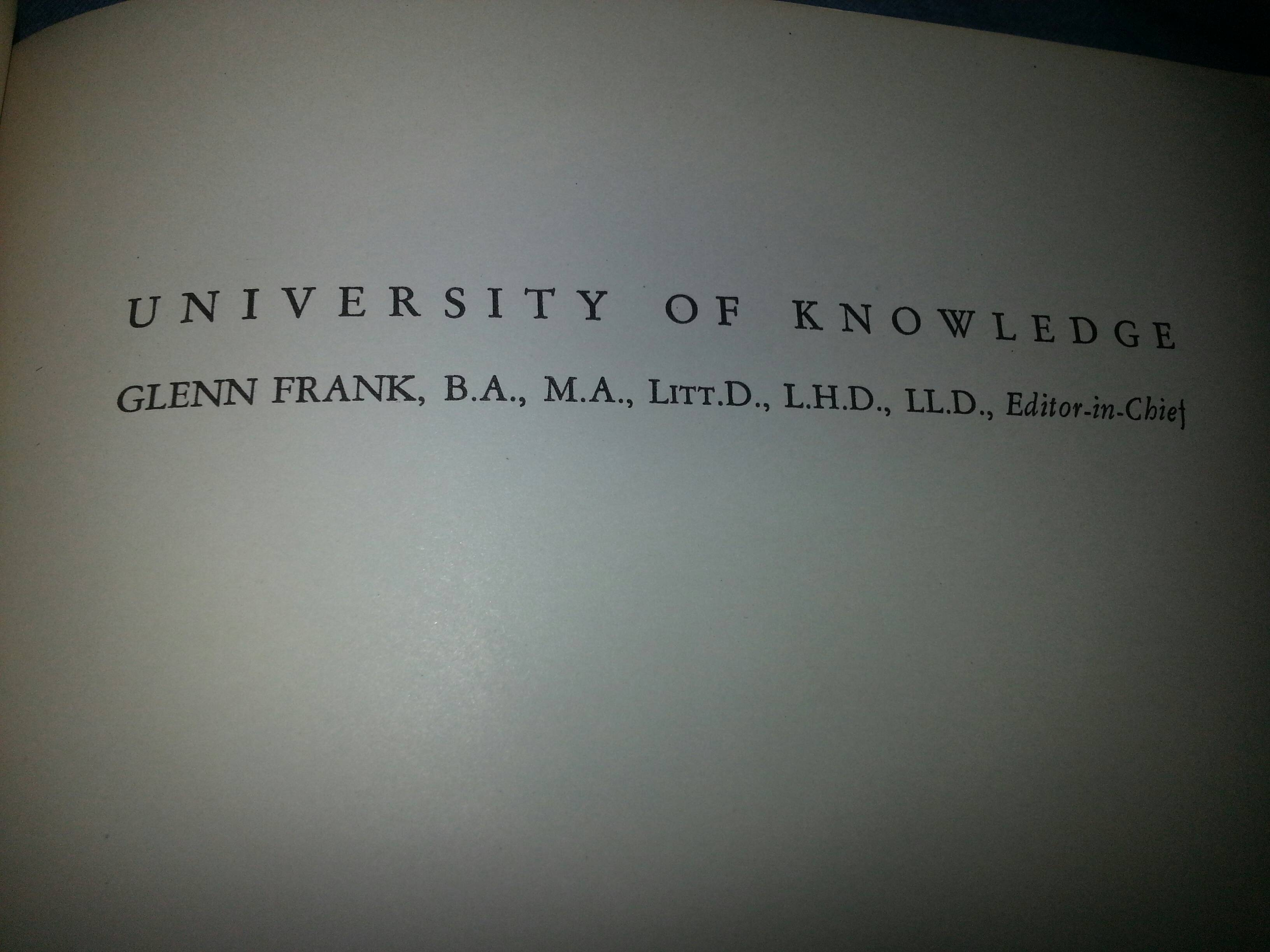
This is a page of the "Dawn of Civilization" book from the Wonder Books series that contains publishing info.

== Books ==
1. The Earth Before Man - The story of how things began
2. The Story of Man - His earliest appearance and development to the portals of history
3. The Dawn of Civilization - And life in the ancient East
4. Selected Readings - from much loved books
5. The Glories of Ancient History
6. History From The Renaissance to Napoleon
7. The Outline of Modern History
8. Outline History of World Literature
9. The World we live in and The people we live with travel
10. The World we live in & The People we live with - still more travel
11. The World we live in & The People we live with - still more travel (Marvels of Asia and the Orient)
12. Great Leaders - Men and women who influenced their times
13. Great Inventors and Their Inventions
14. The Story of Engineering
15. Wonders of Modern Industry - The story of the machine age
16. Music and the Great Composers - The story of musical expression
17. Trailing Animals Around The World
18. Earth and Sky - Wonders of the universe
19. Exploring The Mysteries of Physics and Chemistry
20. The Story of Living Plants, Their Uses and how they grow
21. An Outline History of Art - The Key to Parnassus
22. An Outline History of Art - Art of the Middle Ages in Europe of Islam, in the Far East, and of the American Indians
23. An Outline History of Art - Art of the European Renaissance, Baroque, and Modern Art
24. A Modern Book of Wonders - Amazing Facts in a remarkable world
