= Pick-up sticks =

Game of physical and mental skill

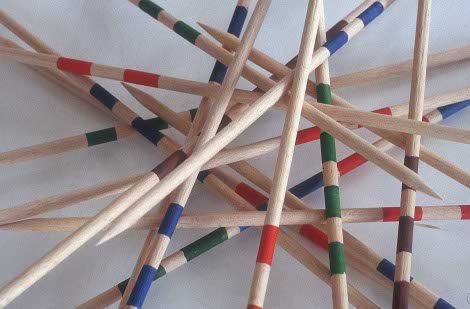
Mikado pick-up sticks

Pick-up sticks, pick-a-stick, jackstraws, jack straws, spillikins, spellicans, or fiddlesticks is a game of physical and mental skill in which a bundle of sticks, between 8 and 20 centimeters long, is dropped as a loose bunch onto a table top into a random pile. Each player, in turn, tries to remove a stick from the pile without disturbing any of the others. The object of the game is to pick up the most sticks or to score the most points based on the color of the sticks.

== History ==
The origin of the game of pick-up sticks is disputed, but it is believed to have developed from the yarrow stalks used for divination with the Chinese I Ching. An English-language reference to a "game at spilakees" dates from 1734. The game became popular in the 1800s in Germany, the United Kingdom (where it was played at least as early as 1845 at Windsor Castle), and the United States. A particularly popular version of the game during the 1930s-50s, 456 Pickup Sticks, was manufactured by O. Schoenhut Inc, an offshoot of the US-based Schoenhut Piano Company.

In the 1800s, pick-up sticks were generally made from ivory or bone; modern sticks may be made of almost any material, such as wood, bamboo, straw, reed, rush, yarrow, or plastics.

The indigenous Haida nation in North America play a game similar to pick-up sticks with sticks made of plain maple wood decorated with abalone shell and copper.

== Play ==
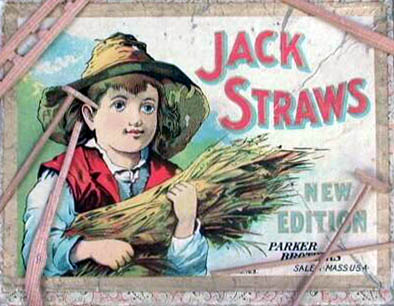
Jack Straws board game published by Parker Brothers in 1895

In a game of pick-up sticks, there are typically 30 or more sticks and at least two players. At the beginning of game play, the bundle of sticks is randomly distributed or dropped so the sticks end up in a tangled pile. The more tangled the pile, the more challenging the game. In some versions of the game any sticks not touching at least one other stick are removed. The first player (sometimes the youngest) attempts to remove a single stick at a time, without moving any other stick. If the player succeeds, that player's turn continues. If a player moves another stick, the turn immediately passes clockwise to the next player.

The object of the game is for a player to pick up more sticks than any other players. In more complex games, different-colored sticks are worth different numbers of points, and the winner is the person with the highest score.

In some versions of the game, the next player can opt to begin a turn by asking the player after that to pick up all the sticks and randomly remake the pile.

In some versions of the game, players may use only their fingers to move the desired stick. In other versions, players may use a tool to move one stick away from the pile; this tool may be one of the sticks, held aside before the game begins, or a particular colored stick, typically black, that may be won by a player who successfully moves it.

== Variants ==
=== Mikado ===
Mikado is a pick-up-sticks game originating in Europe, played with a set of longer sticks which can measure between 17 and 20 centimetres (6.7 and 7.9 in), all having the same length. The game is named for the highest-scoring (blue) stick, the "Mikado" (Emperor of Japan).

==== Mikado scoring ====
Name	Traditional wood type	Coding	Point value	Number of sticks
Mikado	walnut	blue	20 pts	1
Mandarin	cherry	yellow/black, middle wide two narrow stripes on the ends	10 pts	5
Bonzen (jp. bouzu)	oak	orange, five stripes	5 pts	5
Samurai	beech	green, three stripes	3 pts	15
Kuli (cn. guli) / Worker	ash	red, two stripes	2 pts	15

=== Farm tools ===
The pieces in a Farm tools set are related to farmyard tools, such as ladders, rakes, shovels, and hoes. Typically, around 45 pieces are in a set, made of wood, plastic, bone, or ivory. In addition to the tools, typically a helper piece with a hooked end is included for use in snagging and manipulating pieces. Each piece has a point value, with more challenging pieces being worth more points.

==== Farm tools scoring ====
Point Value	Items
10	Two-man saw, Gun, Wrench, Ladder, Key-hole saw
5	Shovel, Rake, Sledge, Fork, T-Square, Paddle, Axe, Crutch, Sword
2	Cane, Arrow, Tamper, Baton, Hockey Stick, Pick
1	All other pieces

== See also ==
- Jonchets, a similar French game, from the 17th century or earlier
- Jenga, a game where players remove blocks from a tower of blocks trying not to collapse it
  - Blockhead!, similar to Jenga
