= James Ball Naylor =

American doctor and writer

James Ball Naylor (1860-1945) was an American doctor who wrote novels, short stories, children's books, and poems. He also lectured. S. Q. Lapius was a pen name he used in newspapers. (the pronunciation of that pen name being a play on the word Aesculapius, the Greek god of medicine). A 1920 publication noted him as a "humorist, lecturer, and poet."

He worked as a teacher for several years he began the study of medicine and attended Starling Medical College. His first wife Myrta Gibson died soon after they were wed. He later married L. Villa Naylor. They had five daughters and a son.

His tale Ralph Marlowe is set in the hill country of Southeastern Ohio. Some of his books were published by Saalfield Publishing Co. of Akron, Ohio.

He lived in McConnellsville, Ohio. He wrote columns for the Ohio Star and Marion Star. He supported Warren G. Harding.

His poem "The Old River Bridge" was read at the July 8, 1902, dedication of the Malta-McConnellsville steel bridge.

Ohio State University has a collection of his papers.

Poems he wrote were published in Flowers by the Wayside in 1891.

The book A Final Test: A Biography of James Ball Naylor by Theresa Marie Flaherty was published in 2011. Sara K. Beardsley wrote an M.A. thesis in 2015 about his "forgotten bestseller" Ralph Marlowe.

His poem "The Final Test" states:

When all is said and all is done,

When all is lost or all is won — In spite of musty theory, Of purblind faith and vain conceit, Of barren creed and sophistry: In spite of all — success, defeat, The Judge accords to worst and best, Impartially, this final test: What hast thou done with brawn and brain, To help the world to lose or gain An onward step? Canst reckon one Unselfish, brave or noble deed, That thou — nor counting cost! Hast done To help a brother’s crying need? Not what professed nor what believed —

But what good thing hast thou achieved?

== Writings ==
=== Novels ===
- Ralph Marlowe (Saalfield Publishing, 1901)
- The Sign of the Prophet (1901)
- In the Days of St. Claire: A Romance of the Muskingum Valley (Saalfield Publishing, 1902) illustrated by W. H. Fry
- Under Mad Anthony's Banner (Saalfield Publishing, 1903)

The sign of the prophet; a tale of Tecumseh and Tippecanoe

- The Cabin in the Big Woods (Saalfield Publishing, 1904)
- The Kentuckian; A thrilling Tale of Ohio Life in the Early Sixties illustrated by A. B. Shute (1905)
- The Scalawags
- A Counterfeit Coin
- The Misadventures of Marjory
- The Sign of the Prophet . A Tale of Tecumseh and Tippecanoe
- Songs from the Heart of Things; A Complete Collection of All the Best Poems of James Ball Naylor

=== Poetry ===
- Golden Rod & Thistle Down
- Songs From the Heart of Things
- Old Home Week illustrated by F. Gilbert Edge (1906)
- Vagrant Verse (1935)
- A Book of Buckeye Verse, being a complete collection of the author's poems and verse readings (1927)

=== Children's books ===
- Witch Crow and Barney Bylow illustrated by Carll B. Williams (1906)
- The Little Green Goblin illustrated by Harry L. Miller (1907)
- Dicky Delightful in Rainbowland
