= George T. Emmons =

George Thornton Emmons
- Born: June 6, 1852; Baltimore, Maryland
- Died: June 11, 1945 (aged 93)
- Military career
- Allegiance: United States
- Branch: United States Navy
- Service years: 1874–99
- Rank: Lieutenant

George Thornton Emmons (June 6, 1852 – June 11, 1945) was an ethnographic photographer and a U.S. Navy Lieutenant.

He was born in Baltimore, Maryland. His father was George Foster Emmons.

He graduated from the U.S. Naval Academy in 1874. In 1881, he attained the Master rank, (1883) Lieutenant J.G. and (1887) Lieutenant.

In 1882, Emmons was stationed on the Pinta in Alaska, remaining there through the 1880s and 1890s. The Navy was largely responsible for stability in the region in those times.

Emmons married Kittie Baker in 1886.

Through his duties, Emmons got in contact with, and interested in, the Alaska Native cultures of the region: particularly the Tlingit and Tahltan. He began to record information and collect artifacts as he visited them on his leaves. He was dedicated to learning about native traditions, such Chilkat weaving, bear hunting, feuds, and the potlatch (a large ceremonial feast). With his understanding of beliefs and values, and his ethnographer's devotion, he also recorded Tlingit vocabulary. He was assigned to the World's Columbian Exposition to accompany the Alaskan exhibit from 1891–1893.

Emmons retired in 1899 and took on special projects for the federal government. He was sent to Alaska in 1901 to locate border stone markers between Canada and the USA. He gave advice about Alaskan game and forests and salmon fishery in 1902. In 1904, he gathered information about white settlers and Alaska Natives and asked President Theodore Roosevelt to investigate the conditions of Alaska Natives and starvation among the Copper River Indians. He received Roosevelt's support, and presented a report to the Congress in 1905.

His interest in Alaska Natives brought him into close contact with the American Museum of Natural History, which purchased his first two collections of Alaska Native artifacts in the 1890s. Emmons had an exchange of items with the Museum for the next three decades. (In 1902, the Field Museum of Natural History purchased a large and varied collection of more than 1,900 Tlingit objects.) F. W. Putnam, curator of the American Natural History Museum, asked for his help on a report in 1896 and repeated the request to the Navy the following year. So Emmons was officially detached from active service and ordered to write the Ethnological Report on the Native Tribes of Southeast Alaska, elaborated from the museum collections. He became a regular contributor to The American Museum Journal (forerunner of Natural History journal) and other scholarly periodicals.

At the recommendation of Franz Boas, with whom he corresponded regularly and at the request of the president of the American Museum of Natural History, Morris K. Jesup, he began to organize his notes and prepare a manuscript on the Tlingit. When he died in Victoria, British Columbia in 1945, the encyclopedic work was still unfinished. The project was taken over by Frederica de Laguna in 1955 and finally published 1991 with the title The Tlingit Indians. It includes topics such as census data, names of clans and houses, species of plants and their uses, native calendars, and names of gambling sticks.

== Writings ==
Journal articles by Emmons, G. T.:

- (1903). The Basketry of the Tlingit. Memoirs of the American Museum of Natural History 3 (2), 229–277.
- (1907). The Chilkat Blanket. Memoirs of the American Museum of Natural History 3 (4), 329–401.
- (1908). Copper Neck-rings of Southern Alaska. American Anthropologist (ns) 10 (4), 644–649.
- (1908). Petroglyphs in Southeastern Alaska. American Anthropologist (ns) 10 (2), 221–230.
- (1909). The Art of the Northwest Coast Indians, Journal of American Museum of Natural History 30 (3).
- (1910). Niska. Bureau of American Ethnology Bulletin 30 (2), 75–76.
- (1911). The Tahltan Indians. Anthropological Publications of the University of Pennsylvania Museum 3. Philadelphia: The University Museum.
- (1912). The Ketselas of British Columbia. American Anthropologist (ns) 14, 467–471.
- (1913). Some Kitksan Totem Poles. American Museum Journal 13. 362–369.
- (1914). Portraiture among the North Pacific Coast Tribes. American Anthropologist (ns) 16, 59–67.
- (1915). Tsimshian Stories in Carved Wood. American Museum Journal 15 (7), 363–366.
- (1921). Slate Mirrors of the Tsimshian. Indian Notes and Monographs (ns) 15, 21.
- (1925). The Kitikshan and Their Totem Poles. Natural History 25, 33–48.
- (1930). The Art of the Northwest Coast Indians: How Ancestral Records Were Preserved in Carvings and Paintings of Mythical or Fabulous Animal Figures. Natural History 30 (3), 282–292. [Reprinted: The Haunted Bookshop, Victoria, BC, 1971.]

Posthumously published books:

- Emmons, George Thornton (reprint 1993). The Basketry of the Tlingit and the Chilkat Blanket. Friends of Sheldon Jackson. ISBN 1-880475-03-0.
- Emmons, George Thornton & (Ed.) de Laguna, Frederica (1991). The Tlingit Indians. Seattle, London, Vancouver: University of Washington Press. ISBN 0-295-97008-1

Chapter headings resemble the breadth of the work: The Land and the People; Social Organization; Villages, Houses, Forts, and Other Works; Travel and Transportation; Fishing and Hunting; Food and its Preparation; Arts and Industries: Men's Work; Arts and Industries: Women's Work; Dress and Decoration; The Life Cycle; Ceremonies; War and Peace; Illness and Medicine; Shamanism; Witchcraft; Games and Gambling; and Time, Tides, and Winds.

- Emmons, George Thornton; (Ed.) Hope, Andrew; (Ed.) Thornton, Thomas (2001). Will the Time Ever Come?: A Tlingit Source Book. University of Washington Press. ISBN 1-877962-34-1.
