= Haida gambling sticks =

Playing sticks made by the Haida people

Haida gambling sticks exist in two sorts. There were non-decorated thin playing sticks (not collected) and the other decorated, containing three sets of sticks. These were named after animals or birds only known by the owner or his family, according to Charles F. Newcombe.

The decoration consists of rings and spiral markings for distinction. Most elaborated sets may contain a Haida art gallery of more than fifty drawings. Made of maple wood, they are decorated with pyro-engravings or carvings. Many pyro-engravings are inlaid with copper or abalone shell. The drawings are complex and an artistic challenge as they are wrapped around a cylinder. Their form is unlocked through slow rotation and are sometimes animated cartoon-like with themes of moving shamans, birds, whales, war scenes, hunting, fishing, etc. The compositions are small and not more than 2 cm in length. The sticks were a field where the Haida became truly documentary. Franz Boas, Swanton and others published drawings of many art sets. George T. Emmons recorded many details about a full set owned by a Tlingit Indian.

It is similar to the pick-up sticks game played today, most notably the jackstraws variation.
