= Helen Gurley Brown =

American author, publisher, and businesswoman

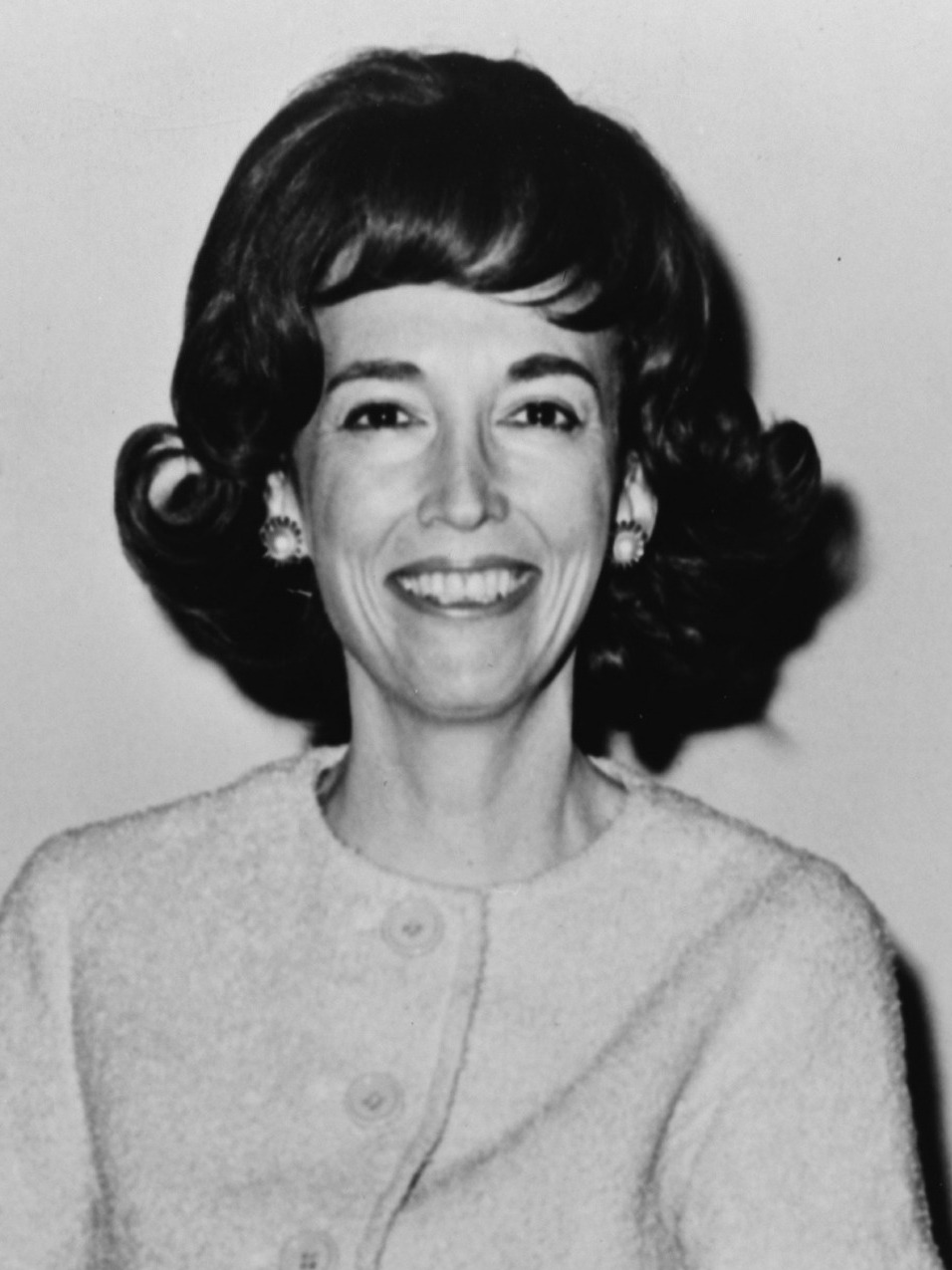
- Brown in 1964
- Born: Helen Marie Gurley; February 18, 1922; Green Forest, Arkansas, U.S.
- Died: August 13, 2012 (aged 90); New York City, U.S.
- Occupations: International Editor, Cosmopolitan
- Notable credit(s): Editor-in-chief, Cosmopolitan
- Title: International editor, Cosmopolitan; former editor-in-chief, U.S. Cosmopolitan
- Spouse: David Brown (m. 1959; died 2010)

Helen Gurley Brown (née Helen Marie Gurley; February 18, 1922 – August 13, 2012) was an American author, publisher, and businesswoman. She was the editor-in-chief of Cosmopolitan magazine for 32 years.

== Early life ==
Helen Marie Gurley was born February 18, 1922, in Green Forest, Arkansas, the younger daughter of Cleo Fred (née Sisco; 1893–1980) and Ira Marvin Gurley. At one time, her father was appointed Commissioner of the Arkansas Game and Fish Commission. After his election to the Arkansas state legislature, the family moved to Little Rock, Arkansas. He died in an elevator accident on June 18, 1932.

In 1937, Gurley, her older sister Mary Eloine (later Mrs. Alford; 1917–1997), and their mother moved to Los Angeles, California. A few months after moving, Mary contracted polio. While in California, Helen attended John H. Francis Polytechnic High School.

After Gurley's graduation, the family moved to Warm Springs, Georgia. She attended one semester at Texas State College for Women and then moved back to California to attend Woodbury Business College, from which she graduated in 1941. While at Woodbury she joined Eta Upsilon Gamma sorority; her chapter later merged into Zeta Tau Alpha. In 1947, Cleo and Mary moved to Cleo's native Osage, Arkansas, while Helen stayed in Los Angeles.

After working at the William Morris Agency, Music Corporation of America, and Jaffe talent agencies, Gurley worked for Foote, Cone & Belding advertising agency as a secretary. Her employer recognized her writing skills and moved her to the copywriting department, where she advanced rapidly to become one of the nation's highest-paid ad copywriters in the early 1960s. In 1959, she married David Brown, who later became a noted film producer.

== Career ==
=== Publishing ===
In 1962, Brown's book Sex and the Single Girl was published in 28 countries, and stayed on the bestseller lists for over a year. In 1964, the book inspired the film of the same name starring Natalie Wood. In 1965, Brown became editor-in-chief of Cosmopolitan, then a literary magazine famed for high-toned content, and reinvented it as a magazine for the modern single career-woman. In the 1960s, Brown was an outspoken advocate of women's sexual freedom and sought to provide women with role models in her magazine. She claimed that women could have it all – "love, sex, and money". As a result of her advocacy, glamorous, fashion-focused women were sometimes called "Cosmo Girls". Her work played a part in what is often called the sexual revolution.

In 1997, Brown was ousted from her role as the U.S. editor of Cosmopolitan and replaced by Bonnie Fuller. When she left, Cosmopolitan ranked sixth at the newsstand and, for the 16th straight year, ranked first in bookstores on college campuses. However, she stayed on at Hearst publishing and remained the international editor for all 59 international editions of Cosmo until her death on August 13, 2012.

In September 2008, Brown was named the 13th-most-powerful American over the age of 80 by Slate magazine.

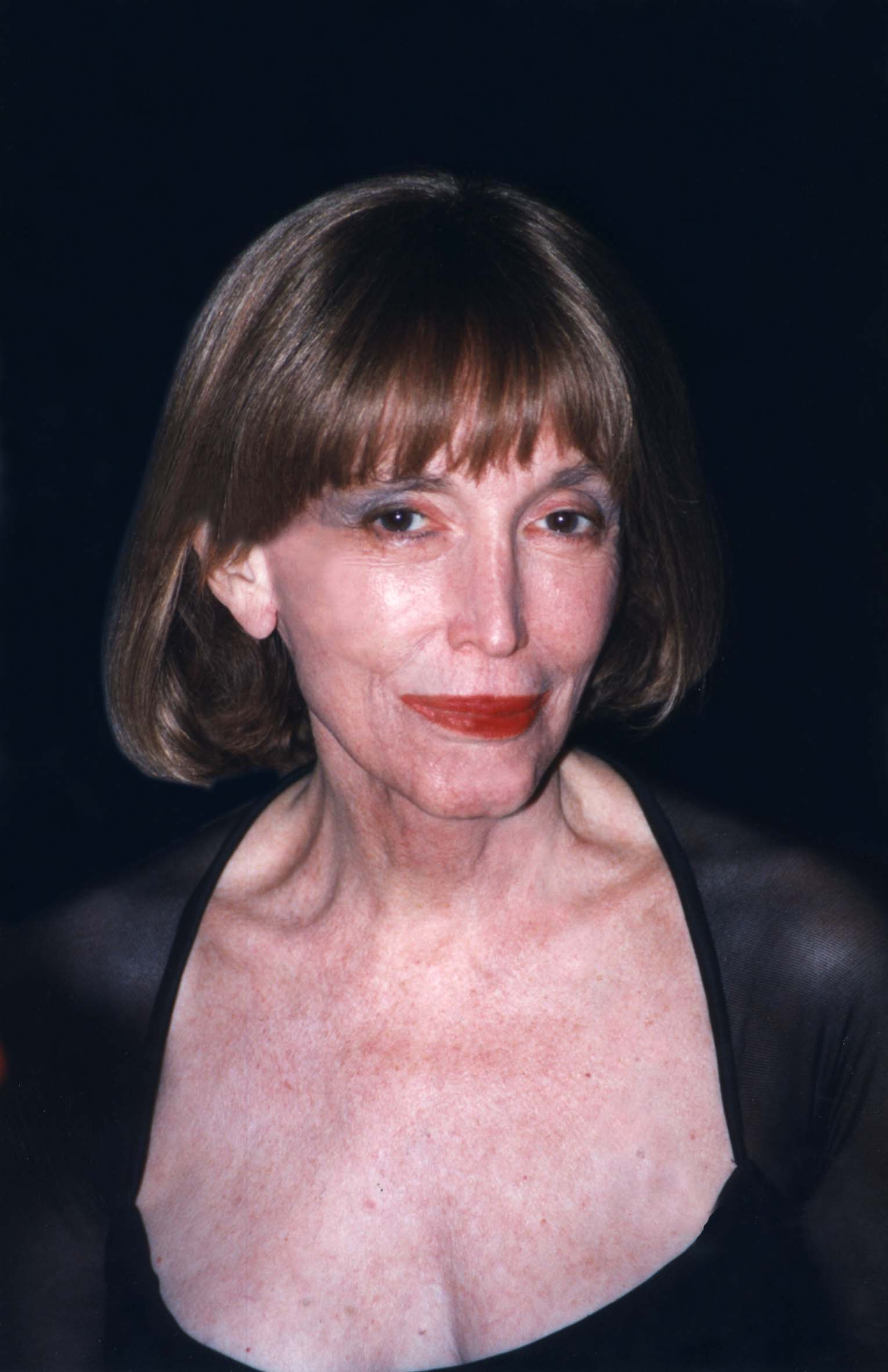
Gurley Brown in 1996

=== At Cosmopolitan ===
In 1965, Gurley Brown took over as editor-in-chief of Cosmopolitan magazine and was in that position until 1997. Brown revamped the magazine by taking it from a women's magazine written by men to one of the most widely sold women's magazines, now available in more than 100 countries. When she began at the magazine, Brown had no editing experience.

Her take on the magazine was to be frank when talking about sex in this new version of Cosmopolitan. Sex and the Single Girl gave Brown the formula that is today's Cosmopolitan. She gave women the freedom to know that women do have sexual desires. The New York Times described the Cosmo Girl that Brown was after as "self-made, sexual and supremely ambitious. ... she looked great, wore fabulous clothes and had an unabashedly good time when those clothes came off." After being gently let go, in 1996 at age 74 due to her increasing disconnection from young women, Brown went on to be editor of the international Cosmopolitan magazines.

Betty Friedan, author of The Feminine Mystique, disliked what Brown had done in her book and in the magazine. Friedan said that what Brown was doing was "anti-feminist" and an "immature teenage-level sexual fantasy". Feminist views of the magazine were re-evaluated in the 1990s, however, with New York Times media reporter Randall Rothenberg writing, "In retrospect, the magazine played an important role in helping young women redefine their roles in society." Audie Cornish from NPR said that Brown "has been called a bad girl, a pioneer in Prada, a revolutionary in stilettos." Brown looked at herself as a feminist, but this description was contested by several others.

== Personal life and death ==
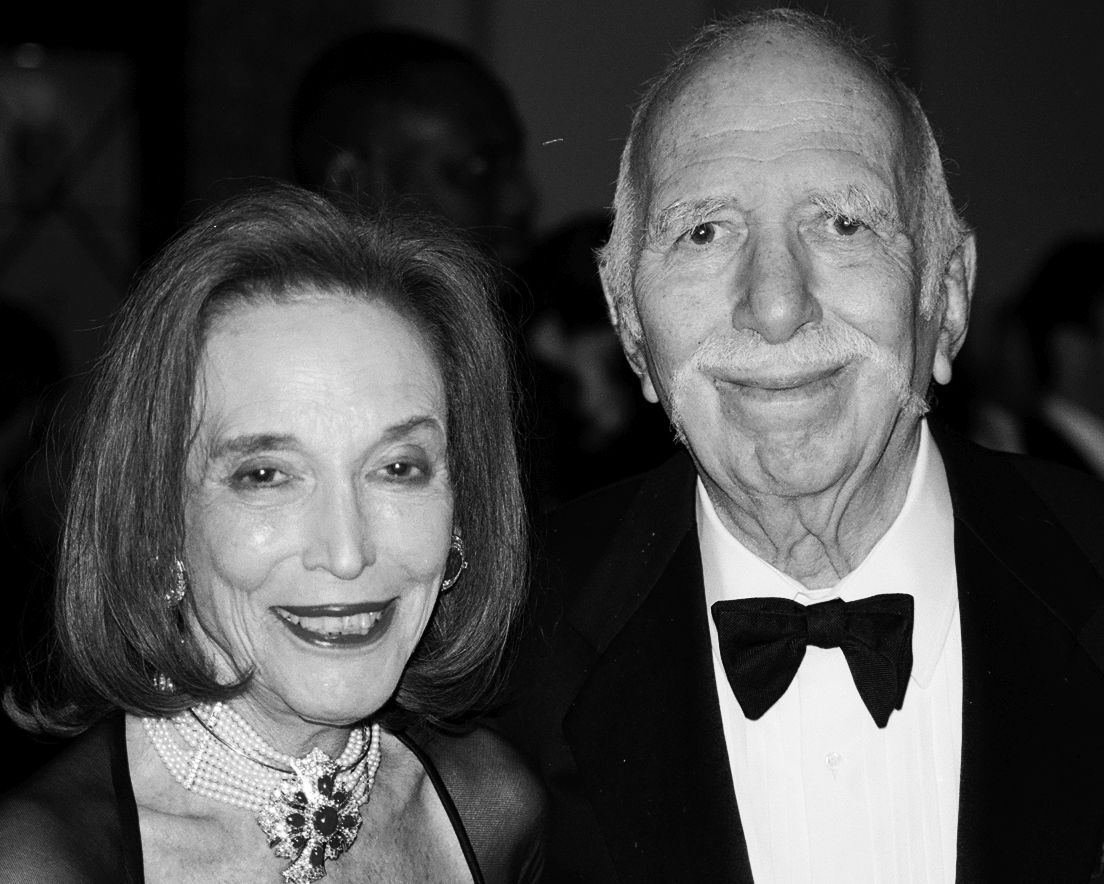
Helen Gurley and David Brown

After a brief hospitalization, Brown died August 13, 2012, at the McKeen Pavilion at New York–Presbyterian Hospital/Columbia. She was 90.

In a statement announcing the news of her death, Hearst Publications noted that "Helen was one of the world's most recognized magazine editors and book authors, and a true pioneer for women in journalism – and beyond." The cause of her death was not disclosed.

Entertainment Weekly said that "Gurley Brown will be remembered for her impact on the publishing industry, her contributions to the culture at large, and sly quips like her famous line: 'Good girls go to heaven. Bad girls go everywhere.'" Then-New York City Mayor Michael Bloomberg, in a statement, said: "Today New York City lost a pioneer who reshaped not only the entire media industry, but the nation's culture. She was a role model for the millions of women whose private thoughts, wonders and dreams she addressed so brilliantly in print."

Brown's only husband, David, preceded her in death on February 1, 2010, at the age of 93. In late November 2012, Brown and her husband were buried in adjacent graves at Sisco Cemetery, her maternal family cemetery in Osage, Carroll County, Arkansas.

== Legacy ==
Seven months prior to her death, continuing the work started with her husband in forming the Helen Gurley Brown Trust, Brown established the Brown Institute for Media Innovation.

This institution is housed at both the Columbia University Graduate School of Journalism and Stanford's Engineering School. Their $38 million donation to the two schools develops journalism in the context of new technologies.

Following her death, the trust continues donating much of its fortune to programs that serve the children of New York City and foster advancements in education and technology. Fifteen million dollars were donated to the New York Public Library, and $7.5 million donated to the American Museum of Natural History.

These donations have collectively created new media programs (David and Helen Gurley Brown Institute for Media Innovation at Columbia) and started initiatives to benefit at-risk youth (NYPL BridgeUp) and increase representation of women and minority groups in STEM disciplines (the AMNH BridgeUp:STEM program).

Among feminists, Brown's role has been highly contested as empowering women to be unashamed of their sexual urges and as creating a magazine that may live on as a sexist magazine with a body image problem. However, some feminists feel that the sexism cannot be blamed all on Cosmopolitan and Brown, with other magazines circulating that objectify women's bodies. These other people look at Brown's work as both "progressive and retrogressive" when it comes to the feminist movement.

Brown also funded the Helen Gurley Brown Fellowship within the BOLD Women's Leadership Network designed to facilitate the pathway for exceptional young women from college to career.

== Awards ==
- 1985: Matrix Award from New York Women in Communications
- 1995: Henry Johnson Fisher Award from the Magazine Publishers of America
- 1996: American Society of Magazine Editors' Hall of Fame Award
- 1998: Editor of the Year by Advertising Age magazine
- 2013 (posthumously): Woman of Achievement Award from the Women's Project Theater

== Works ==
- Sex and the Single Girl (1962)
- Lessons in Love—LP Record on How To Love a Girl & How To Love a Man (1963) Crescendo Records, GNP 604
- Sex and the Office (1965)
- Outrageous Opinions of Helen Gurley Brown (1967)
- Helen Gurley Brown's Single Girl's Cookbook (1969)
- Sex and the New Single Girl (1970)
- Having It All (1982)
- The Late Show: A Semi Wild but Practical Guide for Women Over 50 (1993)
- The Writer's Rules: The Power of Positive Prose—How to Create It and Get It Published (1998)
- I'm Wild Again: Snippets from My Life and a Few Brazen Thoughts (2000)

== See also ==
- List of women's rights activists
