= List of Jeff Bridges performances =

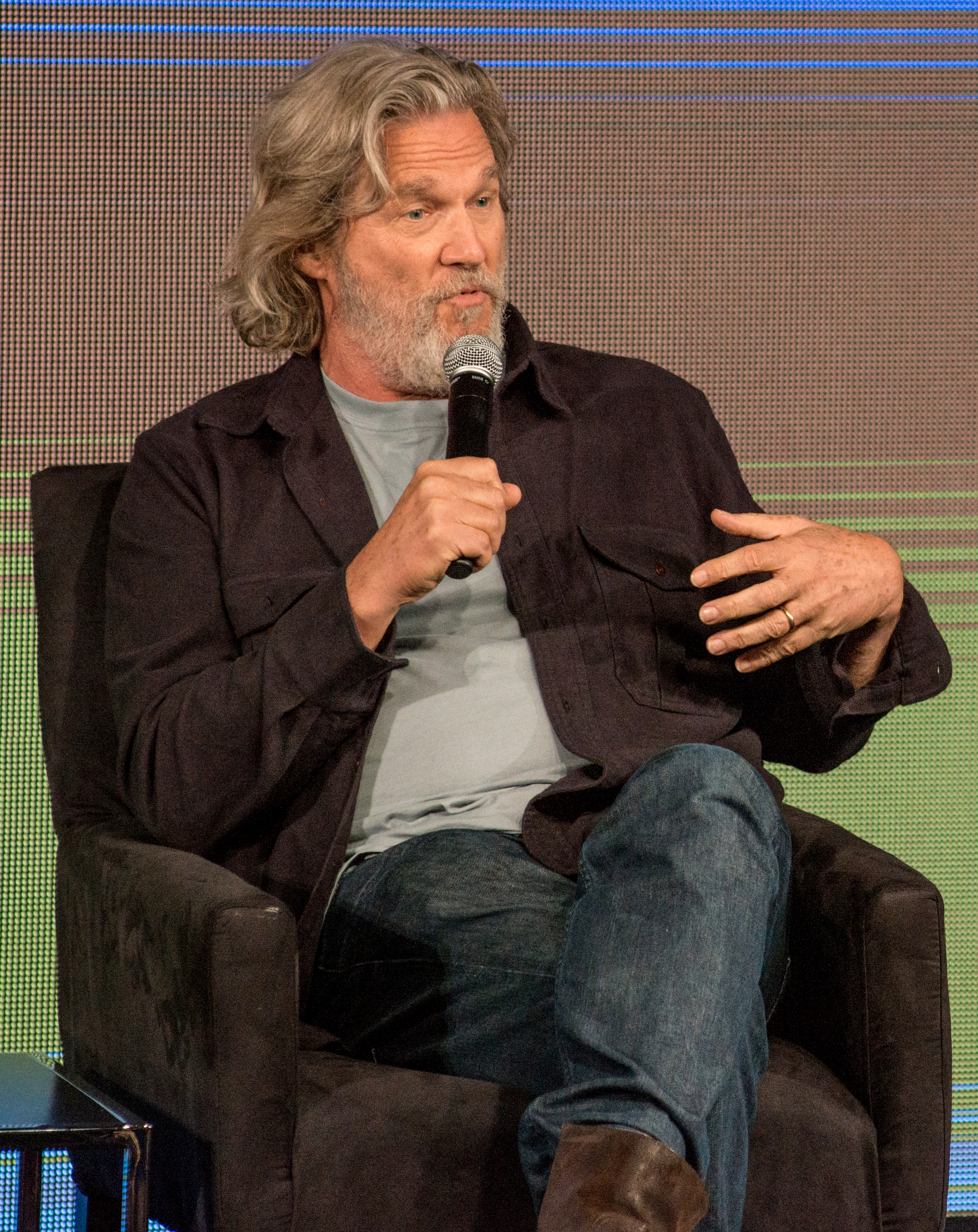
Jeff Bridges discussing The Giver (2014) at a Q&A event.

This is a complete filmography of Jeff Bridges. Apart from an uncredited appearance as an infant in 1951, Bridges made his cinematic debut in 1970 beginning with the film Halls of Anger. His breakthrough came the following year with The Last Picture Show (1971), for which he was nominated for his first Academy Award for Best Supporting Actor. After appearing in several 1972 films such as Fat City and Bad Company; and 1973 films such as The Iceman Cometh, he earned a second Supporting Actor Oscar nomination for Thunderbolt and Lightfoot (1974).

Bridges appeared in films with varied degrees of success throughout the rest of the decade, including Hearts of the West (1975), Stay Hungry (1976), the remake of King Kong (also 1976), and Winter Kills (1979). He also starred in the notoriously over-budget flop Heaven's Gate (1980). However, he followed that with Cutter's Way (1981), Tron (1982), and Starman (1984)—for which he received his third, and this time leading, Academy Award for Best Actor nomination.

He remained a versatile actor, starring in a variety of genres. Succeeding films included Jagged Edge (1985), The Morning After (1986), Tucker: The Man and His Dream (1988); The Fabulous Baker Boys (1989), co-starring his brother Beau Bridges; The Fisher King (1991), American Heart (1993), Fearless (also 1993), The Mirror Has Two Faces (1996); and The Big Lebowski (1998), as "The Dude". He then earned a fourth Oscar nomination, as supporting actor, for The Contender (2000).

The new millennium brought Bridges roles in such films as K-PAX (2001), Seabiscuit (2003), The Door in the Floor (2004); a voice role in Surf's Up (2007); and Iron Man (2008). But it was his role in Crazy Heart (2009) that brought Bridges his fifth Academy Award nomination and first win to date (as Best Actor). He received a sixth, and consecutive, nomination the following year for the remake of True Grit (2010), portraying Rooster Cogburn (which won John Wayne an Oscar for the 1969 original film).

Bridges began to slow his output down in the 2010s, but still featured in several notable films such as The Giver (2014) and Hell or High Water (2016)—the latter of which earned him his seventh Oscar nomination, for supporting. Other films this decade include Kingsman: The Golden Circle (2017) and Bad Times at the El Royale (2018). Most recently, he has starred in the FX/Hulu drama series The Old Man (2022–2024).

== Filmography ==
=== Film ===
Key
†	Denotes films that have not yet been released

Film work by Jeff Bridges
Year	Title	Role	Notes
1951	The Company She Keeps	Infant	Uncredited
1970	Halls of Anger	Douglas "Doug"	
1970	The Yin and the Yang of Mr. Go	Nero Finnegan	
1971	The Last Picture Show	Duane Jackson	
1972	Fat City	Ernie Munger	
1972	Bad Company	Jake Rumsey	
1973	Lolly-Madonna XXX	Zack Feather	
1973	The Last American Hero	Elroy Jackson Jr.	
1973	The Iceman Cometh	Don Parritt	
1974	Thunderbolt and Lightfoot	Lightfoot	
1975	Rancho Deluxe	Jack McKee	
1975	Hearts of the West	Lewis Tater	
1976	Stay Hungry	Craig Blake	
1976	King Kong	Jack Prescott	
1978	Somebody Killed Her Husband	Jerry Green	
1979	Winter Kills	Nick Kegan	
1979	The American Success Company	Harry Flowers	
1980	Heaven's Gate	John L. Bridges	
1981	Cutter's Way	Richard Bone	
1982	Tron	Kevin Flynn / CLU	
1982	Kiss Me Goodbye	Dr. Rupert Baines	
1982	The Last Unicorn	Prince Lír	Voice
1984	Against All Odds	Terry Brogan	
1984	Starman	Scott Hayden / Starman	
1985	Jagged Edge	Jack Forrester	
1986	8 Million Ways to Die	Matthew "Matt" Scudder	
1986	The Morning After	Turner Kendall	
1987	Nadine	Vernon Hightower	
1988	Tucker: The Man and His Dream	Preston Tucker	
1989	See You in the Morning	Larry Livingstone	
1989	Cold Feet	Bartender	Uncredited
1989	The Fabulous Baker Boys	Jack Baker	
1990	Texasville	Duane Jackson	
1991	The Fisher King	Jack Lucas	
1992	American Heart	Jack Kelson	Also producer
1993	The Vanishing	Barney Cousins	
1993	Fearless	Max Klein	
1994	Blown Away	Jimmy Dove / Liam McGivney	
1995	Wild Bill	James Butler "Wild Bill" Hickok	
1996	White Squall	Captain Christopher "Skipper" Sheldon	
1996	The Mirror Has Two Faces	Gregory Larkin	
1998	The Big Lebowski	Jeffrey "The Dude" Lebowski	
1999	Arlington Road	Michael Faraday	
1999	The Muse	Jack Warrick	
1999	Simpatico	Lyle Carter	
2000	The Contender	President Jackson Evans	
2001	Scenes of the Crime	Jimmy Berg	
2001	K-PAX	Dr. Mark Powell	
2002	Lost in La Mancha	Narrator	Documentary
2003	Masked and Anonymous	Tom Friend	
2003	Seabiscuit	Charles S. Howard	
2004	The Door in the Floor	Ted Cole	
2005	The Amateurs	Andy	
2005	Tideland	Noah	
2006	Stick It	Burt Vickerman	
2007	Surf's Up	Ezekiel "Big Z" Topanga / Geek	Voice
2008	Iron Man	Obadiah Stane / Iron Monger	
2008	How to Lose Friends & Alienate People	Clayton Harding	
2009	The Open Road	Kyle	
2009	Crazy Heart	Otis "Bad" Blake	Also executive producer
2009	The Men Who Stare at Goats	Bill Django	
2010	Tron: Legacy	Kevin Flynn / CLU 2	
2010	True Grit	Reuben J. "Rooster" Cogburn	
2011	Tron: The Next Day	Kevin Flynn / CLU 2	Short film
2012	A Place at the Table	Narrator	Documentary
2012	Casting By	Himself	Documentary
2013	R.I.P.D.	Roycephus "Roy" Pulsipher	
2013	Pablo	Narrator	Documentary
2014	The Giver	The Giver	Also producer
2014	Seventh Son	Master Gregory	
2015	The Little Prince	The Aviator	Voice
2016	Hell or High Water	Marcus Hamilton	
2017	Dream Big: Engineering Our World	Narrator	Documentary
2017	The Only Living Boy in New York	W.F. Gerald	Also executive producer
2017	Kingsman: The Golden Circle	Champagne "Champ"	
2017	Only the Brave	Duane Steinbrink	
2018	Bad Times at the El Royale	Father Daniel Flynn / Donald "Dock" O'Reilly	
2018	Living in the Future's Past	Narrator	Documentary; also producer
2019	Dads	Himself	Documentary
2023	Zen Brownie	Narrator	Documentary
2025	Tron: Ares	Kevin Flynn	
2026	Minions & Monsters	Frank / Elwood	Voice

=== Television ===
Television work by Jeff Bridges
Year	Title	Role	Notes
1958–1960	Sea Hunt	Davey Crane / Jimmy / Boy / Kelly Bailey	4 episodes
1962–1963	The Lloyd Bridges Show	Various characters	3 episodes
1965	The Loner	Bud Windom	Episode: "The Ordeal of Bud Windom"
1969	The F.B.I.	Terry Shelton	Episode: "Boomerang"
1969	Lassie	Cal Baker	Episode: "Success Story"
1969	Silent Night, Lonely Night	John Young	Television film
1970	The Don Knotts Show	Himself	1 episode
1970	The Most Deadly Game	Hawk	Episode: "Nightbirds"
1971	In Search of America	Mike Olson	Television film
1981	Great Performances	Michael Loomis	Episode: "The Girls in Their Summer Dresses and Other Stories"
1983	Faerie Tale Theatre	Claude / Prince	Episode: "Rapunzel"
1983, 2010	Saturday Night Live	Himself / Host	Episode: "Beau Bridges and Jeff Bridges/Randy Newman"; Episode: "Jeff Bridges/Eminem and Lil Wayne"
1996	Hidden in America	Vincent	Television film; also executive producer
2000	Raising the Mammoth	Narrator	Discovery Channel special
2002	Reading Rainbow	Narrator	Episode: "The Tin Forest"
2008	A Dog Year	Jon Katz	Television film
2022–2024	The Old Man	Dan Chase	Main role
