= List of awards and nominations received by Jeff Bridges =

Jeff Bridges awards and nominations
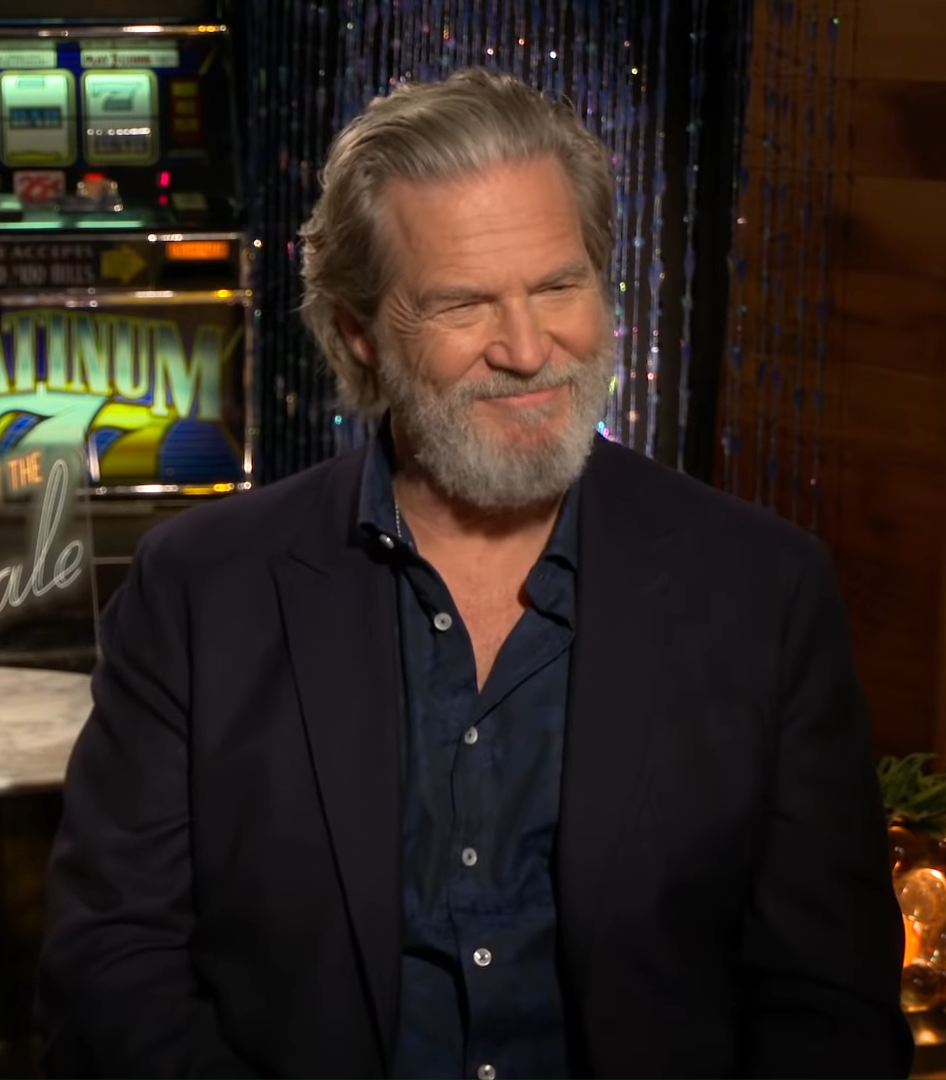
- Bridges in 2019
Awards and nominations
Award	Wins	Nominations
Golden Globe	2	6
Academy Awards	1	7
BAFTA Awards	0	3
Emmy Awards	0	2
Screen Actors Guild Awards	1	5

The following is a list of awards and nominations received by American actor Jeff Bridges. He has received various awards throughout his career spanning over seven decades, including an Academy Award, two Golden Globe Awards, a Screen Actors Guild Award, and two Independent Spirit Awards. In 2019 he received the Golden Globe Cecil B. DeMille Award.

He soon gained attention for his role in the Peter Bogdanovich drama The Last Picture Show (1971) earning his first Academy Award nomination. He cemented himself as a leading man earning Oscar nominations for Thunderbolt and Lightfoot (1974), Starman (1984), The Contender (2000), True Grit (2010), and Hell or High Water (2016). He received the Academy Award for Best Actor for his role as an alcoholic singer in Crazy Heart (2009).

Bridges is also known for his work on television receiving a Primetime Emmy Award for Outstanding Lead Actor in a Limited Series or Movie nomination for his role in the HBO movie A Dog Year (2009).

== Major associations ==
=== Academy Awards ===
Year	Category	Nominated work	Result	Ref.
1972	Best Supporting Actor	The Last Picture Show	Nominated	
1975	Best Supporting Actor	Thunderbolt and Lightfoot	Nominated	
1985	Best Actor	Starman	Nominated	
2001	Best Supporting Actor	The Contender	Nominated	
2010	Best Actor	Crazy Heart	Won	
2011	Best Actor	True Grit	Nominated	
2017	Best Supporting Actor	Hell or High Water	Nominated	

=== BAFTA Award ===
British Academy Film Awards
Year	Category	Nominated work	Result	Ref.
2010	Best Actor in a Leading Role	Crazy Heart	Nominated	
2011	Best Actor in a Leading Role	True Grit	Nominated	
2017	Best Actor in a Supporting Role	Hell or High Water	Nominated	

=== Golden Globe Awards ===
Year	Category	Nominated work	Result	Ref.
1985	Best Actor in a Motion Picture – Drama	Starman	Nominated	
1992	Best Actor in a Motion Picture – Musical or Comedy	The Fisher King	Nominated	
2001	Best Supporting Actor – Motion Picture	The Contender	Nominated	
2010	Best Actor in a Motion Picture – Drama	Crazy Heart	Won	
2017	Best Supporting Actor – Motion Picture	Hell or High Water	Nominated	
2019	Cecil B. DeMille Award		Honored	
2023	Best Television Actor - Drama Series	The Old Man	Nominated	

=== Emmy Awards ===
Primetime Emmy Awards
Year	Category	Nominated work	Result	Ref.
2010	Outstanding Lead Actor in a Limited Series or Movie	A Dog Year	Nominated	
2023	Outstanding Lead Actor in a Drama Series	The Old Man	Nominated	

=== Screen Actors Guild Awards ===
Year	Category	Nominated work	Result	Ref.
2001	Outstanding Supporting Actor in a Motion Picture	The Contender	Nominated	
2004	Outstanding Ensemble Cast in a Motion Picture	Seabiscuit	Nominated	
2010	Outstanding Leading Actor in a Motion Picture	Crazy Heart	Won	
2011	Outstanding Leading Actor in a Motion Picture	True Grit	Nominated	
2017	Outstanding Supporting Actor in a Motion Picture	Hell or High Water	Nominated	
2023	Outstanding Actor in a Drama Series	The Old Man	Nominated	
2025	Outstanding Actor in a Drama Series	The Old Man	style="background: #FFE3E3; color: black; vertical-align: middle; text-align: center; " class="no table-no2 notheme"|Nominated	

== Miscellaneous awards ==
=== Gotham Awards ===
Year	Category	Nominated work	Result	Ref.
2016	Best Actor	Hell or High Water	Nominated	

=== Independent Spirit Awards ===
Year	Category	Nominated work	Result	Ref.
1992	Best Male Lead	American Heart	Won	
2004	Best Male Lead	The Door in the Floor	Nominated	
2009	Best Male Lead	Crazy Heart	Won	

=== Saturn Awards ===
Year	Category	Nominated work	Result	Ref.
1984	Best Actor	Starman	Won	
1991	Best Actor	The Fisher King	Nominated	
1993	Best Actor	The Vanishing	Nominated	
2008	Best Supporting Actor	Iron Man	Nominated	
2011	Best Actor	Tron: Legacy	Won	
2019	Best Actor	Bad Times at the El Royale	Nominated	

=== Satellite Awards ===
Year	Category	Nominated work	Result	Ref.
1998	Best Actor in a Motion Picture	The Big Lebowski	Nominated	
2000	Best Supporting Actor in a Motion Picture	The Contender	Nominated	
2003	Best Supporting Actor in a Motion Picture	Seabiscuit	Nominated	
2009	Best Actor in a Motion Picture	Crazy Heart	Nominated	
2016	Best Supporting Actor in a Motion Picture	Hell or High Water	Won	

=== Teen Choice Awards ===
Year	Category	Nominated work	Result	Ref.
2008	Choice Movie Villain	Iron Man	Nominated	

== Critic associations ==
Year	Award	Category	Nominated work	Result
2009	Alliance of Women Film Journalists	Eda Award for Best Actor	Crazy Heart	Won
2009	Critics' Choice Awards	Best Movie Actor	Crazy Heart	Won
2009	Denver Film Critics Society	Denver Film Critics Society Award for Best Actor	Crazy Heart	Won
2009	Los Angeles Film Critics Association	Los Angeles Film Critics Association Award for Best Actor	Crazy Heart	Won
2009	Palm Springs International Film Festival	Desert Palm Achievement Award	Crazy Heart	Won
2009	PRISM Awards	PRISM Award for Best Performance in a Feature Film	Crazy Heart	Won
2009	Chicago Film Critics Association	Chicago Film Critics Association Award for Best Actor	Crazy Heart	Nominated
2009	Dallas–Fort Worth Film Critics Association	Dallas–Fort Worth Film Critics Association Award for Best Actor	Crazy Heart	Nominated
2009	Houston Film Critics Society	Houston Film Critics Society Award for Best Actor	Crazy Heart	Nominated
2009	London Film Critics Circle Awards	London Film Critics Circle Award for Best Actor	Crazy Heart	Nominated
2009	Online Film Critics Society	Online Film Critics Society Award for Best Actor	Crazy Heart	Nominated
2009	St. Louis Gateway Film Critics	St. Louis Gateway Film Critics Association Award for Best Actor	Crazy Heart	Nominated
2009	Central Ohio Film Critics Association	COFCA Award for Best Actor	Crazy Heart	Nominated
2010	Chicago Film Critics Association	Chicago Film Critics Association Award for Best Actor	True Grit	Nominated
2010	Critics' Choice Awards	Best Movie Actor	True Grit	Nominated
2010	Detroit Film Critics Society	Detroit Film Critics Society Award for Best Actor	True Grit	Nominated
2010	Houston Film Critics Society	Houston Film Critics Society Award for Best Actor	True Grit	Nominated
2010	Las Vegas Film Critics Society	Las Vegas Film Critics Society Award for Best Actor	True Grit	Nominated
2010	London Film Critics Circle Awards	London Film Critics Circle Award for Best Actor	True Grit	Nominated
2010	National Movie Awards	National Movie Award for Performance of the Year	True Grit	Nominated
2010	Online Film Critics Society	Online Film Critics Society Award for Best Actor	True Grit	Nominated
2010	Phoenix Film Critics Society	Phoenix Film Critics Society Award for Best Actor	True Grit	Nominated
2010	St. Louis Gateway Film Critics	St. Louis Gateway Film Critics Association Award for Best Actor	True Grit	Nominated
2010	Utah Film Critics Association	Utah Film Critics Association Award for Best Actor	True Grit	Nominated
2016	Houston Film Critics Society	Houston Film Critics Society for Best Supporting Actor	Hell or High Water	Won
2016	Australian Academy of Cinema and Television Arts Awards	Best International Supporting Actor – Cinema	Hell or High Water	Nominated
