= Jeff Bridges =

American actor (born 1949)

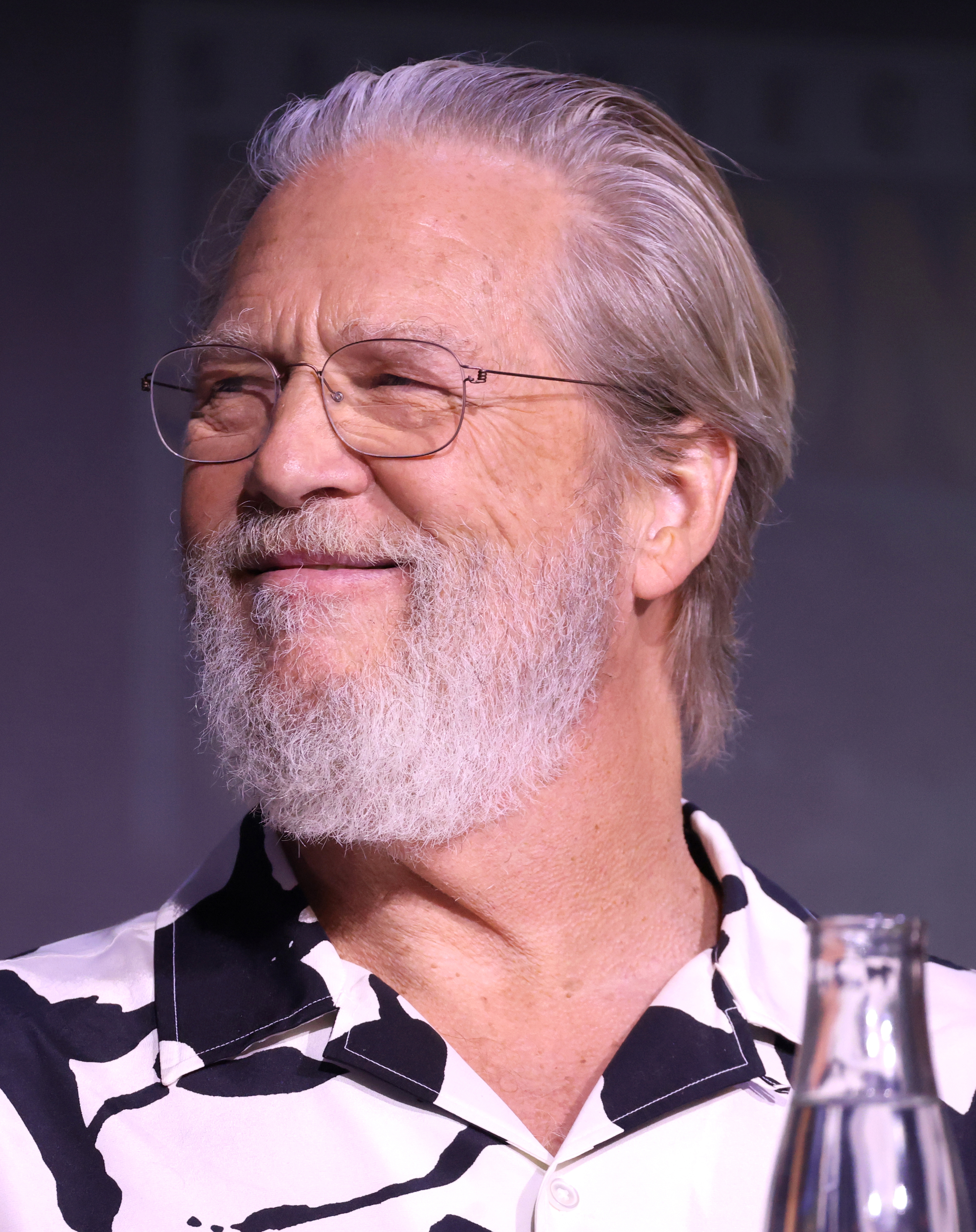
- Bridges in 2025
- Born: Jeffrey Leon Bridges; December 4, 1949 (age 76); Los Angeles, California, U.S.
- Occupations: Actor; film producer; singer
- Years active: 1951–present
- Works: Full list
- Spouse: Susan Geston (m. 1977)
- Children: 3
- Parent(s): Lloyd Bridges; Dorothy Bridges
- Family: Beau Bridges (brother); Jordan Bridges (nephew)
- Awards: Full list
- Military service
- Allegiance: United States
- Branch: United States Coast Guard
- Service years: 1967–1975
- Rank: Petty officer second class
- Website: jeffbridges.com

Jeffrey Leon Bridges (born December 4, 1949) is an American actor and singer. Bridges describes himself as an actor, musician, photographer, painter, sculptor, campaigner, and storyteller.

He is best known for his leading man roles in film and television. In a career spanning more than seven decades, he has received various accolades, including an Academy Award and a Golden Globe Award, in addition to nominations for three BAFTA Awards and two Primetime Emmy Awards. In 2019, he was awarded the Cecil B. DeMille Award.

Born into a prominent acting family, Bridges appeared on the television series Sea Hunt (1958–1960) alongside his father, Lloyd, and brother, Beau. He made his feature film debut in the drama Halls of Anger (1970), and starred in The Last Picture Show (1971), which earned him his first Academy Award nomination. As a leading man, he starred in the adventure film King Kong (1976); neo-noir Cutter's Way (1981); science fiction film Tron (1982); thrillers Jagged Edge (1985) and The Morning After (1986); dramas The Fabulous Baker Boys (1989), The Fisher King (1991), and The Mirror Has Two Faces (1996); and crime comedy The Big Lebowski (1998).

Bridges received further Oscar nominations for his roles in Thunderbolt and Lightfoot (1974), Starman (1984), The Contender (2000), True Grit (2010), and Hell or High Water (2016); and won the Academy Award for Best Actor for his role as an alcoholic singer in Crazy Heart (2009). He has also starred in big-budget films, such as Seabiscuit (2003), Iron Man (2008), and Tron: Legacy (2010). On television, he earned Primetime Emmy Award nominations for his performances in the HBO film A Dog Year (2009), and the FX series The Old Man (2022–2024).

== Early life and education ==
Jeffrey Leon Bridges was born on December 4, 1949, in Los Angeles, the son of actor Lloyd Bridges (1913–1998) and actress and writer Dorothy Bridges (née Simpson; 1915–2009). He is one of four children: older brother Beau Bridges (born December 9, 1941), who is also an actor; a younger sister Lucinda; and a brother named Garrett, who died of sudden infant death syndrome in 1948. His maternal grandfather was an immigrant from Liverpool, England.

Bridges and his siblings were raised in the Holmby Hills section of Los Angeles. He shared a close relationship with his brother Beau, who acted as a surrogate father when their father was working. He graduated from University High School in 1967. At age 17 he toured with his father in a stage production of Anniversary Waltz, and then moved to New York City, where he studied acting at the Herbert Berghof Studio. He also served in the United States Coast Guard Reserve as a boatswain's mate from 1967 to 1975 in San Luis Obispo, California, with a terminal rating of Boatswain's Mate Second Class.

== Career ==
=== 1951–1970: Early roles ===
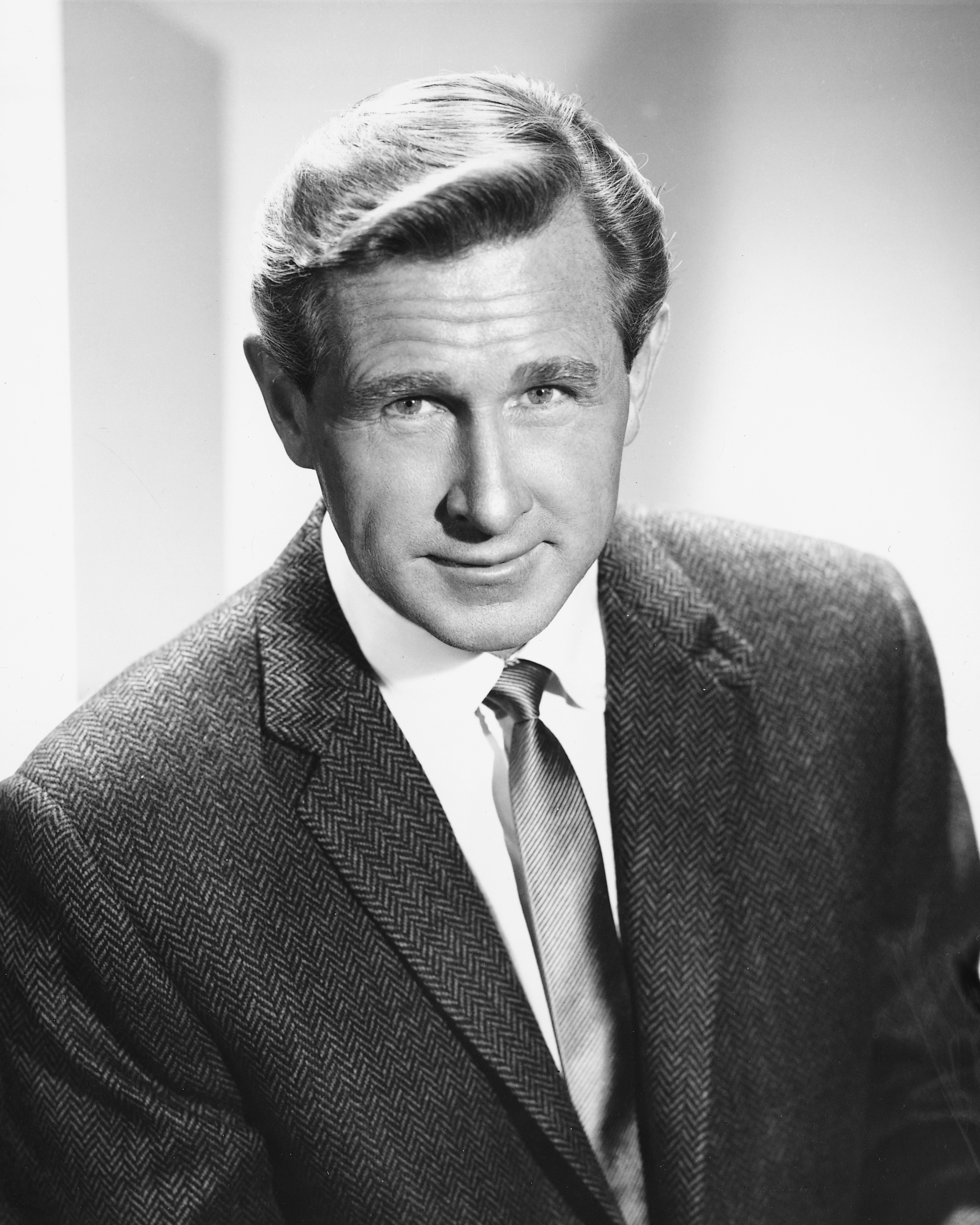
Jeff Bridges acted alongside his father, Lloyd Bridges, in Sea Hunt and The Lloyd Bridges Show

Bridges made his first screen appearance in an uncredited role in The Company She Keeps (1951); the film was released shortly after his first birthday. In his youth, Bridges and his brother Beau made occasional appearances on their father's show Sea Hunt (1958–1961) and the CBS anthology series The Lloyd Bridges Show (1962–1963). In 1965, he played a supporting role alongside his father in an episode of The Loner. In 1969, he played Job Corps crew member Cal Baker in the Lassie episode "Success Story". Bridges and Rob Reiner both had their first movie roles in a school desegregation picture from United Artists called Halls of Anger.

=== 1971–1989: Breakthrough and stardom ===
In 1971, he played the lead role Mike in the television film In Search of America. His first major role came in the 1971 film The Last Picture Show, for which he garnered a nomination for the Academy Award for Best Supporting Actor. He next co-starred in the 1972 gritty boxing film Fat City, directed by John Huston. In 1973, he starred as Junior Jackson in The Last American Hero, a film based on the true story of NASCAR driver Junior Johnson. He was again nominated for Best Supporting Actor for his performance opposite Clint Eastwood in the 1974 film Thunderbolt and Lightfoot.

In 1976, he starred as the protagonist Jack Prescott in the first remake of King Kong, opposite Jessica Lange. This film was a commercial success, earning $90 million worldwide, more than triple its $23 million budget, and also winning an Academy Award for Best Visual Effects. Towards the end of the decade he acted in mystery Somebody Killed Her Husband (1978) opposite Farrah Fawcett, the satirical black comedy Winter Kills (1979) alongside John Huston, and the comedy-drama The American Success Company (1979). In 1980, he acted in Michael Cimino's large Western ensemble film Heaven's Gate acting opposite Kris Kristofferson, Christopher Walken, John Hurt, Sam Waterston, and Isabelle Huppert. The film was a public critical and commercial failure and was blamed for the downfall of the studio, United Artists.

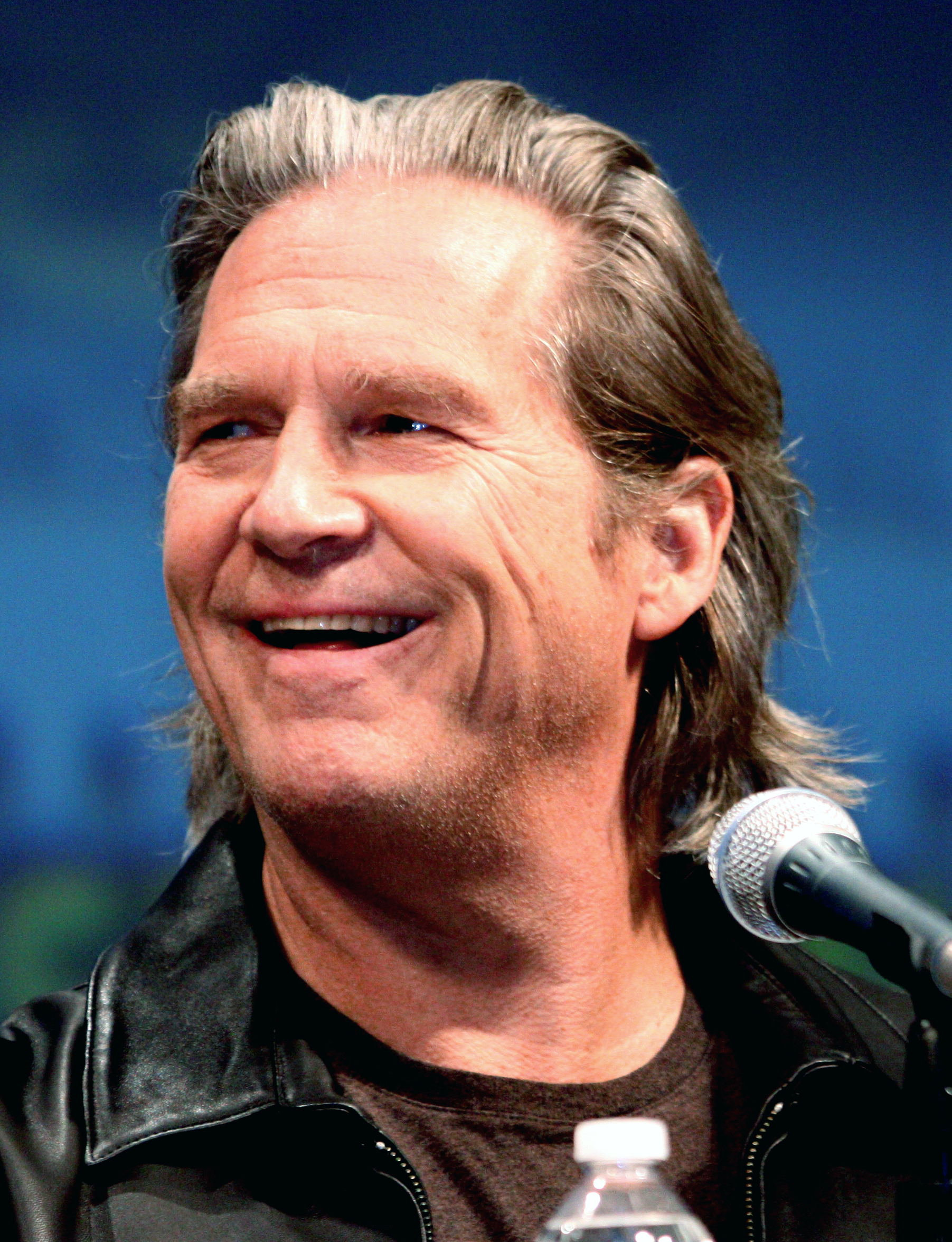
Bridges in 2009

In 1982, Bridges starred in the science fiction film Tron, in which he played Kevin Flynn, a video game programmer. Critic Roger Ebert described the film as "brilliant" and compared it to The Empire Strikes Back (1980), writing, "This movie is a machine to dazzle and delight us...[and] in a technical way maybe it's breaking ground for a generation of movies in which computer-generated universes will be the background for mind-generated stories about emotion-generated personalities". Also in 1982, he voiced Prince Lir in the animated fantasy film The Last Unicorn alongside Alan Arkin, Mia Farrow, and Angela Lansbury and starred in the romantic comedy Kiss Me Goodbye directed by Robert Mulligan, acting alongside Sally Field.

In 1984, he starred in the John Carpenter–directed science fiction romance Starman playing an alien opposite Karen Allen. For his performance he was nominated for the Academy Award for Best Actor. During this period he also performed in the neo-noir Against All Odds (1984) with James Woods and Rachel Ward, the thrillers Jagged Edge (1985) opposite Glenn Close and The Morning After (1986) with Jane Fonda, and the crime comedy Nadine (1987) alongside Kim Basinger. In 1988 he portrayed automobile entrepreneur Preston Tucker in the Francis Ford Coppola directed biographical film Tucker: The Man and His Dream which earned positive reviews. The following year he acted in two romance films, the Alan J. Pakula directed See You in the Morning with Alice Krige and Farrah Fawcett and the Steve Kloves directed The Fabulous Baker Boys starring opposite Michelle Pfeiffer and his real life brother Beau Bridges.

=== 1990–2007: Established actor ===
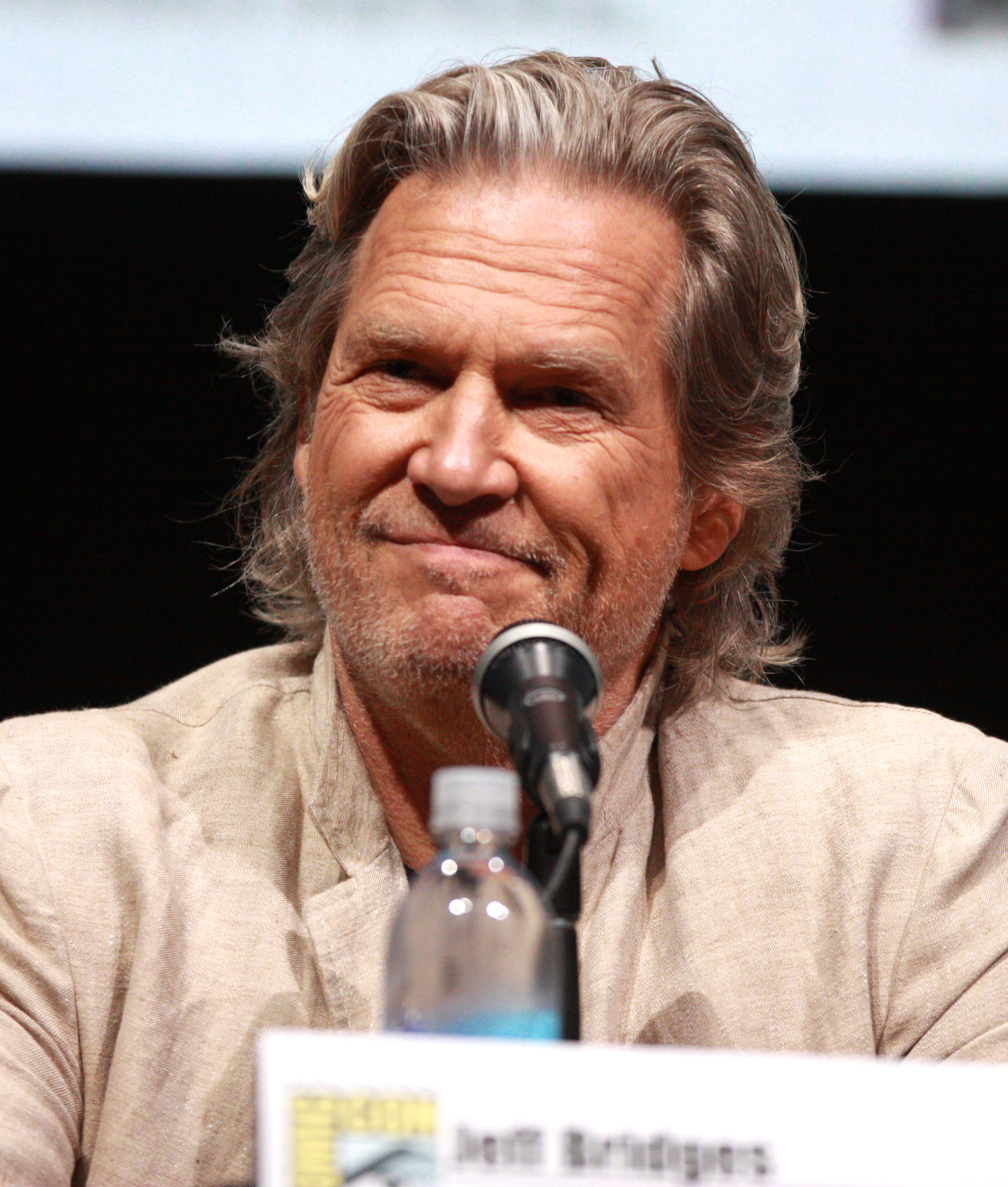
Jeff Bridges in 2013

In 1990, he reunited with Cybill Shepherd for Peter Bogdanovich's Texasville, a sequel to the 1971 film The Last Picture Show, which Bridges had starred in. The film also starred Cloris Leachman, Eileen Brennan, and Randy Quaid. The film was based on the 1987 novel of the same name by Larry McMurtry. Bridges said of making the film, "[It] was like constantly being hit over the head by deja vu. Every day I'd grab Peter and place him in some corner on the street where we were shooting and I'd say, 'Now 20 years ago what did you say to me as I was standing right here?'". The following year he starred in Terry Gilliam's fantasy comedy-drama The Fisher King (1991) opposite Robin Williams, Mercedes Ruehl and Amanda Plummer. In the film he plays a misanthropic radio shock jock who befriends a homeless person on the quest to find love and the Holy Grail. For their performances they both received nominations for the Golden Globe Award for Best Actor – Motion Picture Musical or Comedy. In 1992 he produced and starred as a man released from prison in the Martin Bel directed drama American Heart earning the Independent Spirit Award for Best Male Lead. Film critic Janet Maslin of The New York Times praised Bridges' performance writing, "It's time to recognize Mr. Bridges as the most underappreciated great actor of his generation...he has managed to transform himself to an astonishing degree."

In 1993, he starred in the Peter Weir directed drama Fearless (1993) alongside Isabella Rossellini, John Turturro, and Rosie Perez. His role is thought by some critics to be one of his best performances. One critic dubbed it a masterpiece; Pauline Kael wrote that he "may be the most natural and least self-conscious screen actor that has ever lived". In 1994, he starred as Lt. Jimmy Dove in the action film Blown Away, opposite Tommy Lee Jones and Forest Whitaker. His real-life father Lloyd Bridges was also featured in the film, playing the uncle of Bridges' character. The film was not a financial success, managing to recoup $30 million of its $50 million budget at the box office, with its release a few weeks after another explosive-themed film, Speed. On July 11, 1994, Bridges received a star on the Hollywood Walk of Fame for his contributions to the motion picture industry. The star is located at 7065 Hollywood Boulevard. Bridges portrayed James Butler "Wild Bill" Hickok in the western film Wild Bill (1995) acting with Ellen Burstyn, John Hurt and Bruce Dern. The film received mixed reviews and was a box-office bomb. In 1996 he acted in the Showtime television film Hidden in America alongside his brother Beau Bridges and Frances McDormand.

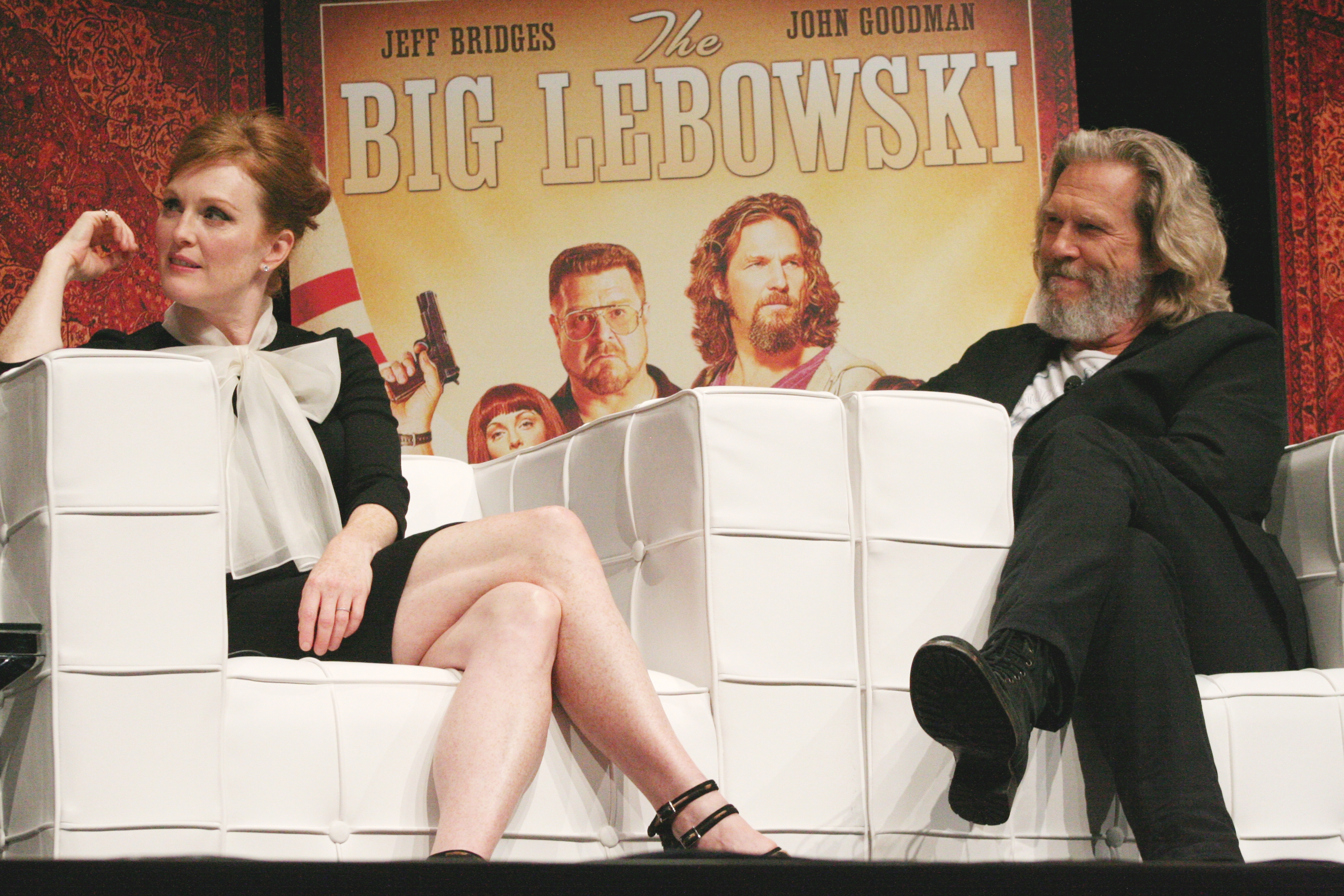
Julianne Moore and Bridges at LebowskiFest in 2011

The following year acted in Ridley Scott's survival drama White Squall and co-starred with Barbra Streisand in the romantic comedy The Mirror Has Two Faces. In 1998, he starred as what is arguably his most iconic role, Jeffrey "The Dude" Lebowski, in the Coen brothers' noir comedy The Big Lebowski. He played a fictional president of the United States in the political drama The Contender acting opposite Gary Oldman and Joan Allen. For his performance he earned his fourth Academy Award nomination as well as nods for the Golden Globe Award and Screen Actors Guild Award for Best Actor. The following year he acted in the science-fiction drama K-Pax opposite Kevin Spacey. He portrayed businessman Charles S. Howard in the horse racing drama film Seabiscuit co-starring with Tobey Maguire and Chris Cooper. The film was based on the 1999 book of the same name by Laura Hillenbrand. The film earned an Academy Award for Best Picture nomination. He also starred in the 2005 Terry Gilliam fantasy film Tideland co-starring with Janet McTeer and Jennifer Tilly. That was Bridges' second collaboration with Gilliam, the first being 1991's The Fisher King alongside Robin Williams.

Bridges hosted VH1's Top 100 Greatest Albums of Rock and Roll series in 2001. Bridges narrated the documentary Lost in La Mancha (2002), about the making of a Terry Gilliam retelling of Don Quixote, tentatively titled The Man Who Killed Don Quixote, which would have starred Johnny Depp as Sancho Panza and Jean Rochefort as the quixotic hero. Bridges also narrated the documentaries National Geographic's Lewis & Clark: Great Journey West (2002, IMAX), Discovery Channel's Raising the Mammoth (2000), and ABC's Heroes of Rock and Roll (1979). He voiced the character Big Z in the animated film Surf's Up (2007). Bridges has performed TV commercial voiceover work as well, including Hyundai's 2007 "Think About It" advertising campaign, and the Duracell advertisements in the "Trusted Everywhere" campaign.

=== 2008–present: Career expansion ===
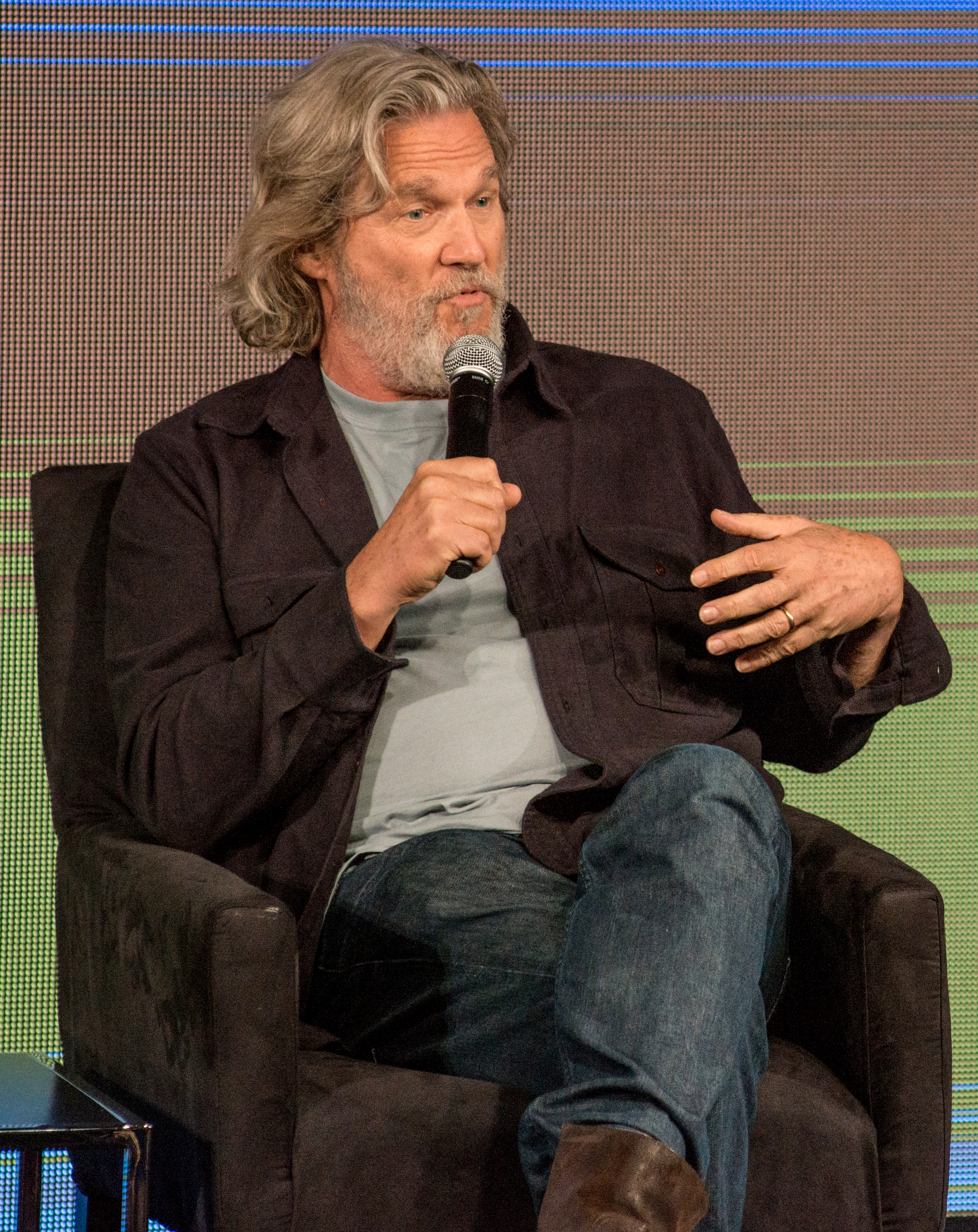
Bridges at an event for The Giver in 2014

In 2008, Bridges shaved his head to play the role of Obadiah Stane in the Marvel comic book adaptation of Iron Man starring Robert Downey Jr. In July 2008, at San Diego Comic-Con, he appeared in a teaser, reprising his 1982 fan favorite role of Kevin Flynn for Tron: Legacy. Also in 2008 he acted in the HBO film A Dog Year earning a Primetime Emmy Award nomination. He then acted in the comedy films How to Lose Friends & Alienate People (2008), and The Open Road (2009). He gained widespread acclaim for his role as an alcoholic country singer in Crazy Heart (2009) for which he earned the Academy Award for Best Actor as well as the Golden Globe for Best Actor in a Drama and the Screen Actors Guild Award for Best Actor in a Leading Role. Bridges is one of the youngest actors ever to be nominated for an Academy Award (1972, age 22, Best Supporting Actor, The Last Picture Show), and one of the oldest ever to win (winning the Best Actor in 2010 at age 60 for Crazy Heart).

In 2009, he acted in the satirical comedy The Men Who Stare at Goats alongside George Clooney, Ewan McGregor, and Kevin Spacey. In 2010 he reprised his role as Kevin Flynn in Tron: Legacy acting with Garrett Hedlund and Olivia Wilde. Bridges received his sixth Academy Award nomination for his role in True Grit, a collaboration with the Coen brothers in which he starred alongside Matt Damon, Josh Brolin, Barry Pepper, and Hailee Steinfeld. Both the film and Bridges' performance as Rooster Cogburn were critically praised. Bridges lost to Colin Firth, whom he had beaten for the Oscar in the same category the previous year. On December 18, 2010, Bridges hosted NBC's Saturday Night Live; he had hosted the show before in 1983 with his brother, Beau. With the December 18, 2010, episode, Bridges beat Sigourney Weaver's record for longest gap between hosting appearances on SNL. (Weaver had a 24-year gap between her first time hosting in 1986 and her second time hosting in 2010, while Bridges had a 27-year gap between his first appearance in 1983 and his most recent one, also in 2010.)

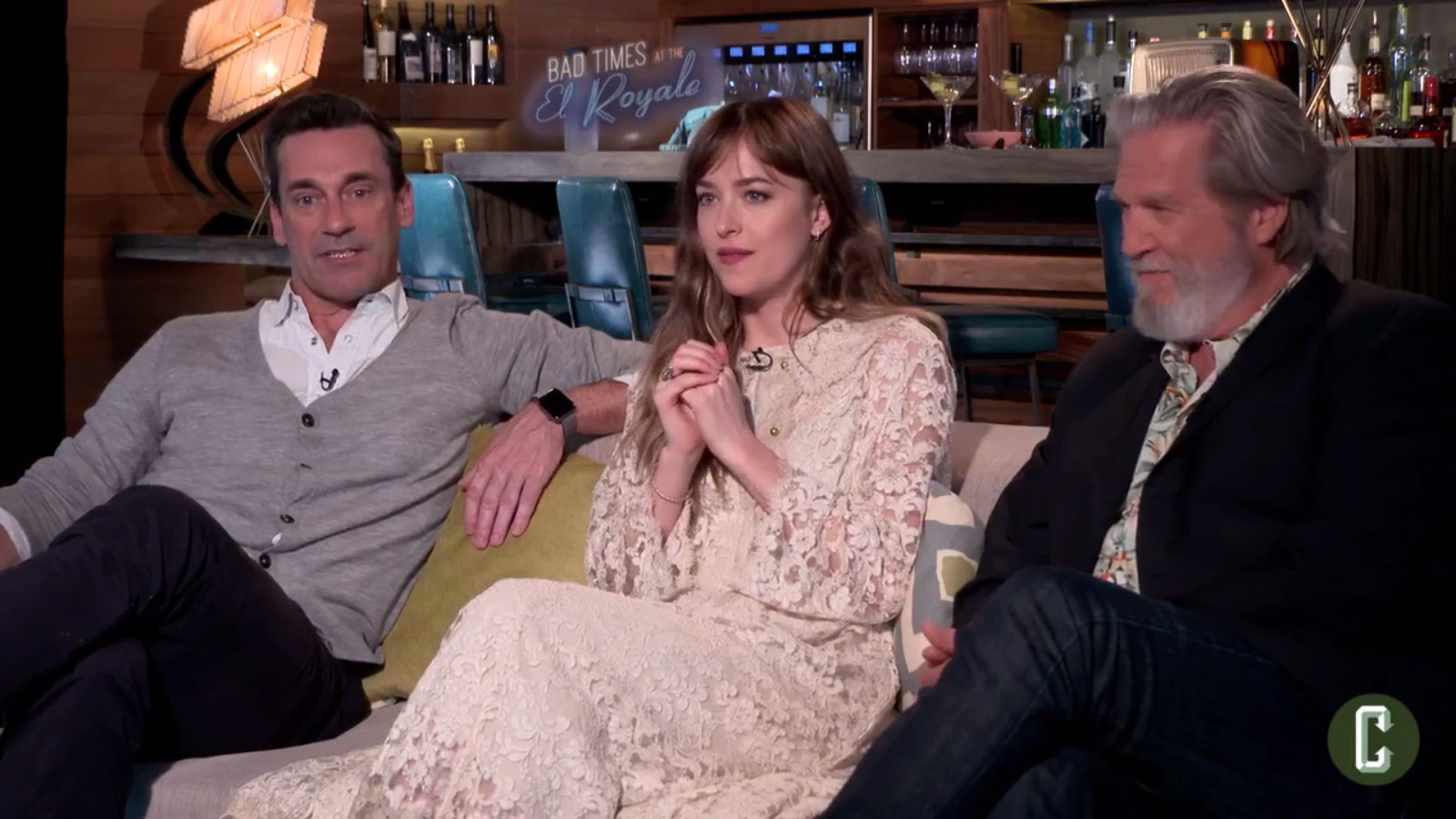
Jon Hamm, Dakota Johnson, and Bridges promoting Bad Times at the El Royale (2018)

In 2013, he starred alongside Ryan Reynolds in the action comedy R.I.P.D. which was a box office and critical failure. That same year Bridges wrote The Dude and the Zen Master with Bernie Glassman. Bridges found himself at a party with Glassman and Ram Dass and their conversation led to discussing the parallels between "The Dude" from The Big Lebowski and Zen Buddhism. The book was formed from what has been described as a "transcript of a five-day 'hang' on a Montana ranch." The following year he produced and starred as the title role in dystopian drama The Giver and acted in the action fantasy film Seventh Son, which were both critically panned and the latter a box office flop. In 2015 Bridges voiced The Aviator in the animated film The Little Prince based on the 1943 children's novella of the same name. The following year he narrated the documentary Dream Big: Engineering Our World (2015) and acted in the Taylor Sheridan directed neo-Western drama film Hell or High Water (2015) opposite Chris Pine and Ben Foster. For the role he received his a nomination for the Academy Award for Best Supporting Actor, which would be his seventh Oscar nomination.

In 2017, he acted in the romantic drama The Only Living Boy in New York with Callum Turner and Kate Beckinsale and in the spy action comedy Kingsman: The Golden Circle starring Taron Egerton and Colin Firth. In 2018 he acted in the neo-noir ensemble thriller Bad Times at the El Royale with Cynthia Erivo, Dakota Johnson, and Jon Hamm. For his contribution to films, he was presented with the Cecil B. DeMille Award in 2019. Starting in 2022 he acted in the FX drama thriller series The Old Man opposite John Lithgow. For his performance he earned nominations for the Primetime Emmy Award for Outstanding Lead Actor in a Drama Series and the Golden Globe Award for Best Actor – Television Series Drama. In 2024, Bridges received the annual Chaplin Gala Award which was held at Alice Tully Hall at Lincoln Center. Also in 2024, it was announced that Bridges would be reprising his role as Kevin Flynn in Tron: Ares.

In June 2024, he was cast as God in the upcoming comedy film Carnival: At the End of Days.

== Interests ==
=== Music ===
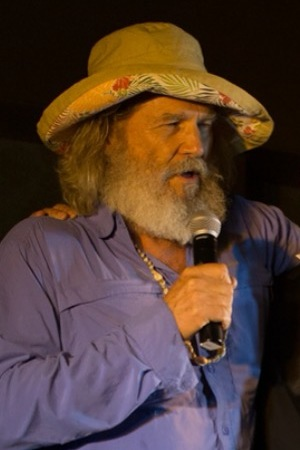
Bridges during a concert in 2016

Referring to his career as an actor and his passion for music, Bridges says, "I dug what an actor did, but it took me a while to feel it, to truly appreciate the craft and the preparation. Plus, I was still playing music a lot, and I guess I had a hard time choosing: was I an actor or a musician, or could I be both?" Bridges studied piano at a young age, strongly encouraged by his mother. Before his first lead role as an actor he already sold two songs to the musician and composer Quincy Jones, who used his "Lost in Space" for the soundtrack of the 1970 film John and Mary and let Bridges contribute the vocals. While working on the 1980 film Heaven's Gate, he often played guitar with his co-star, singer-songwriter Kris Kristofferson, between takes. His character in Crazy Heart, Bad Blake, was later based partly on Kristofferson. In 1982, he voiced the character of Prince Lír in the animated film The Last Unicorn, and in that role sang on two songs, including a duet with Mia Farrow. He released his debut album Be Here Soon on January 1, 2000. In 2005, Bridges, known as "The Dude" in the film The Big Lebowski, showed up at a Lebowski Fest in Los Angeles singing and playing the film's theme song written by Bob Dylan, "Man in Me".

On January 15, 2010, Bridges performed the song "I Don't Know" from Crazy Heart on The Tonight Show with Conan O'Brien. In the film The Contender, in which he co-starred, Bridges recorded a version of Johnny Cash's standard "Ring of Fire" with Kim Carnes that played over the pivotal opening credits. In February 2010, he was among the nearly 80 musicians to sing on the charity-single remake of We Are the World. On October 24, 2010, Bridges appeared at Neil Young's annual Bridge School Benefit concert and played a set with singer-songwriter Neko Case. On April 19, 2011, Country Music Television announced that Bridges had signed a recording contract with Blue Note Records/EMI Music Group. He worked with producer T Bone Burnett and released his second album, Jeff Bridges, on August 16, 2011. On November 5, 2011, Bridges played Austin City Limits in support of this album.

In 2015, he sang on the album Strangers Again, performing a duet with Judy Collins of the song "Make Our Garden Grow" from Candide by Leonard Bernstein. The same year, he released an ambient/spoken-word album entitled Sleeping Tapes. All proceeds from the album go directly to Bridges' charity No Kid Hungry. Bridges plays many guitars, including the Gretsch Chet Atkins Country Gentlemen Model G6122-19. In 2020, Bridges partnered with Breedlove Guitars to release his signature Oregon Concerto Bourbon CE with "All In This Together" scrawled across the fretboard. In 2025, he shared a verse and chorus on the song "Men in Bars" from Japanese Breakfast's album For Melancholy Brunettes (& Sad Women).

=== Photography ===
Bridges has been an amateur photographer since high school. He began taking photographs on film sets during Starman at the suggestion of co-star Karen Allen in 1984, with his favorite camera, a Widelux F8 that his wife bought him. He published many of these photographs online and in a 2003 book entitled Pictures: Photographs by Jeff Bridges. In 2013, he received an Infinity Award for his photos from the International Center of Photography in New York. A follow-up book, Jeff Bridges: Pictures Volume Two, was published in 2019.

== Personal life ==
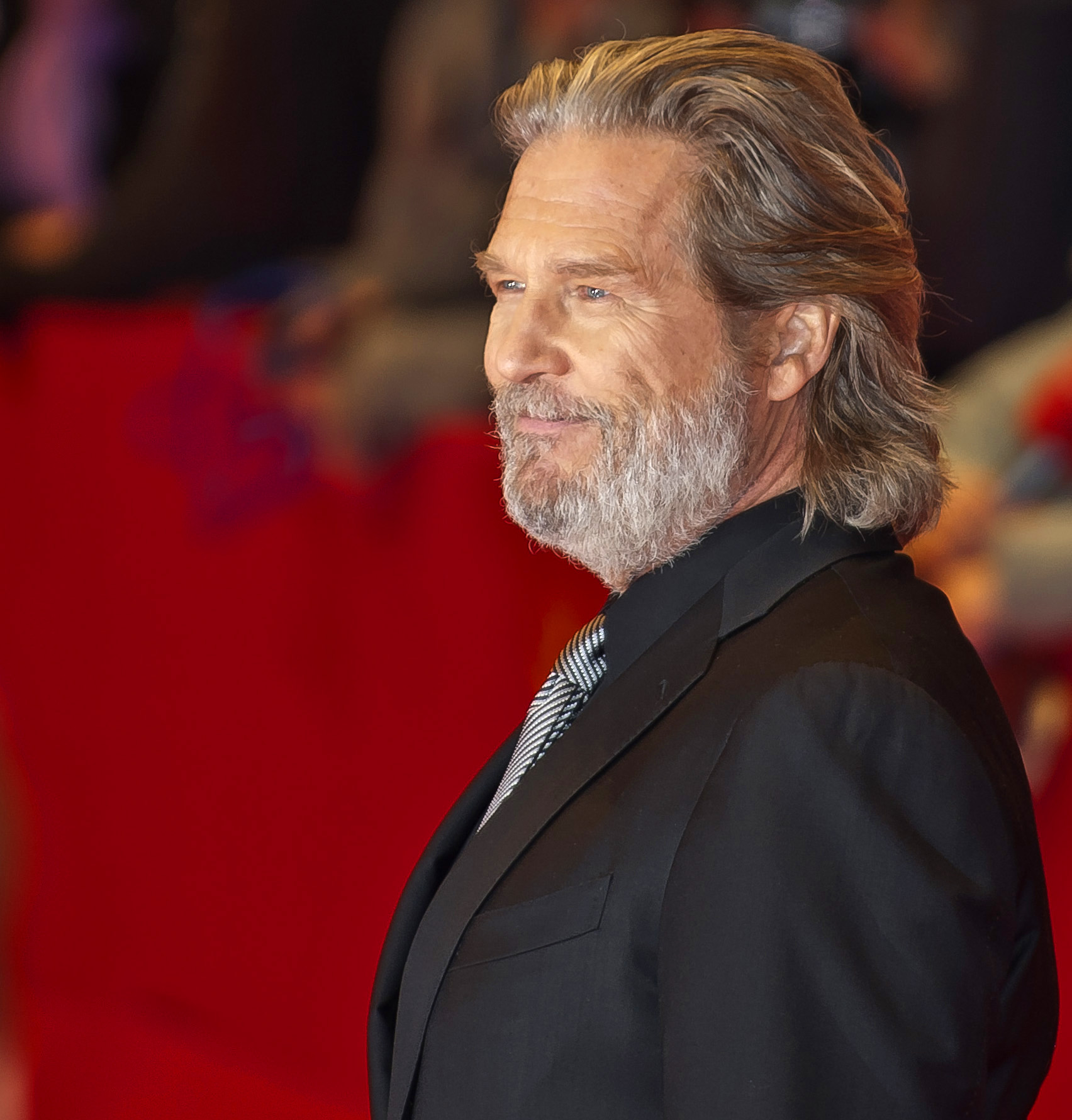
Bridges at the premiere of True Grit at the 2011 Berlin Film Festival

Bridges and his siblings inherited their family house in Malibu from their parents. In January 2025, the house burned down in the Palisades Fire. The property was listed for sale in 2026. He also owns a ranch in Paradise Valley, Montana. He previously had a house in Montecito, California, which was sold to Oprah Winfrey.

Bridges dated Candy Clark for several years after they met on the set of Fat City in 1972.

=== Marriage and family ===
Bridges and Susan Geston met in 1974 while filming Rancho Deluxe (1975), on a ranch where Geston had been working as a waitress. In 1975, they appeared together in Stay Hungry (1976). Bridges married Geston in 1977. They have three daughters.

=== Religious beliefs ===
Bridges has studied Buddhism and has described himself as "a Buddhistly bent guy". He has co-written a book with the Zen master Bernie Glassman on the subject, but doesn't consider himself a Buddhist in terms of formal affiliation, saying he only enjoys the meditation part. On most days, he meditates for half an hour before beginning work on a film set.

Bridges wanted to use Glassman's teachings to influence the script of Tron: Legacy and suggested that Olivia Wilde read Glassman's Infinite Circle: Teachings in Zen to help inform her performance in the film.

=== Health problems ===
On October 19, 2020, Bridges announced that he had been diagnosed with non-Hodgkin lymphoma and has gone through chemotherapy. On September 12, 2021, Bridges announced that his cancer was in remission: "My cancer is in remission — the 9" × 12" mass has shrunk down to the size of a marble." Bridges also announced he contracted COVID-19 while in treatment and which he fought for almost five weeks.

He described the long process of recovery from both diseases, relating how large his tumor had grown, yet being unaware it was there. After five weeks in the hospital with COVID, he had months of recuperation at home before he could function again.

=== Philanthropy ===
In 1984, Bridges and other entertainment industry leaders founded the End Hunger Network aimed at encouraging, stimulating and supporting action to end childhood hunger. He supported President Barack Obama's initiative to end childhood hunger by 2015. In November 2010, Bridges became spokesman for the No Kid Hungry campaign of the organization Share our Strength. Its goal was to present and undertake a state-by-state strategy to end childhood hunger in the United States by 2015. Bridges also supports environmental causes and organizations such as the Amazon Conservation Team.

== Filmography ==
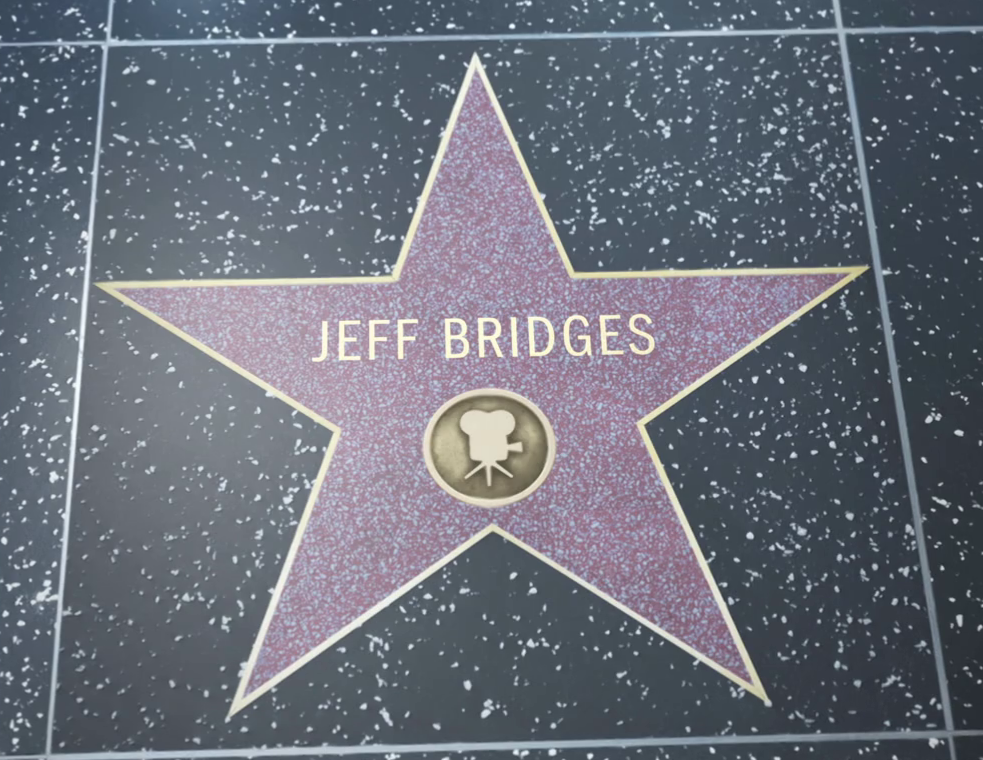
Bridges' star on the Hollywood Walk of Fame

== Discography ==
Overview of Jeff Bridges albums
Title	Details	Peak chart positions				Sales
Title	Details	US Country	US	USFolk	USRock	Sales
Be Here Soon	Release date: January 1, 2000; Label: Ramp Records; Formats: CD	—	—	—	—	
Jeff Bridges	Release date: August 16, 2011; Label: Blue Note Records; Formats: CD, music download	10	25	2	5	US: 345,000
Sleeping Tapes	Release date: January 28, 2015; Label: Squarespace; Formats: CD, music download	—	—	—	—	
Slow Magic: 1977-1978	Release date: Record Store Day 2025; Label: Light in the Attic Records; Formats: CD, vinyl, music download	—	—	—	—	

Overview of Jeff Bridges singles
Single	Year	Album
"What a Little Bit of Love Can Do"	2011	Jeff Bridges

Overview of Jeff Bridges music videos
Title	Year	Director
"What a Little Bit of Love Can Do"	2011	Alan Kozlowski

Overview of Jeff Bridges guest appearances
Title	Year	Other artist(s)	Album
"Make our Garden Grow"	2015	Judy Collins	Strangers Again
"Men in Bars"	2025	Japanese Breakfast	For Melancholy Brunettes (& Sad Women)

== Works ==
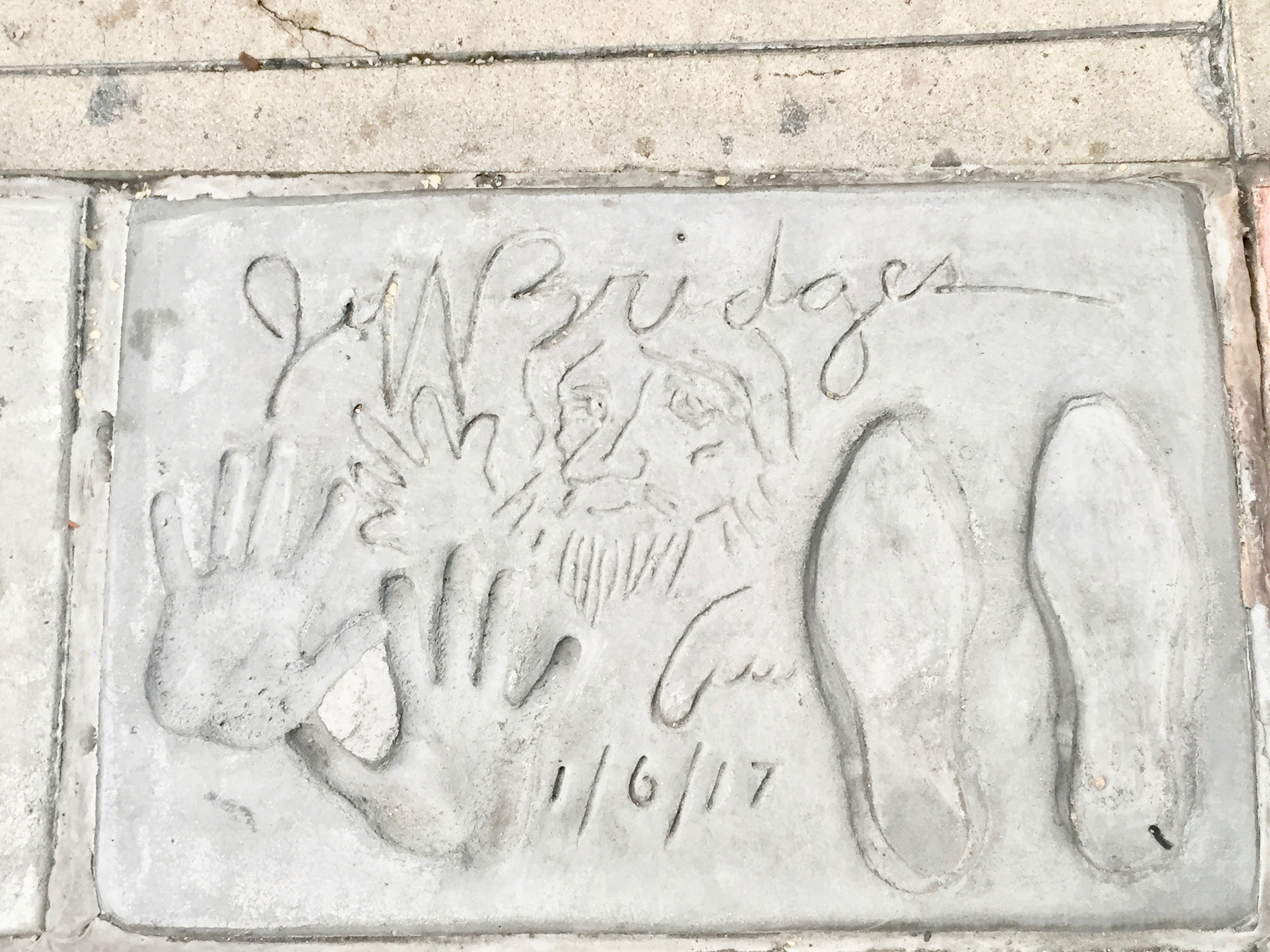
Jeff Bridges's signature, self-portrait, handprints, and footprints in the concrete in front of Grauman's Chinese Theatre in Los Angeles.

- Bridges, Jeff; Glassman, Bernie (2013). The Dude and the Zen Master. Blue Rider Press. ISBN 978-0399161643.
- Bridges, Jeff (2004). Pictures by Jeff Bridges. PowerHouse Books. ISBN 978-1576871775.
- Bridges, Jeff (2019). Pictures by Jeff Bridges: Volume Two. PowerHouse Books. ISBN 978-1576879368.

== See also ==
- List of oldest and youngest Academy Award winners and nominees — Oldest winners for Best Lead Actor
- List of actors with Academy Award nominations
- List of actors with more than one Academy Award nomination in the acting categories
- List of Golden Globe winners
