= Bad Times at the El Royale =

2018 American film by Drew Goddard

- Theatrical release poster
- Directed by: Drew Goddard
- Written by: Drew Goddard
- Produced by: Jeremy Latcham; Drew Goddard
- Starring: Jeff Bridges; Cynthia Erivo; Dakota Johnson; Jon Hamm; Cailee Spaeny; Lewis Pullman; Chris Hemsworth
- Cinematography: Seamus McGarvey
- Edited by: Lisa Lassek
- Music by: Michael Giacchino
- Production company: Goddard Textiles
- Distributed by: 20th Century Fox
- Release dates: September 22, 2018 (Los Angeles); October 12, 2018 (United States)
- Running time: 141 minutes
- Country: United States
- Language: English
- Budget: $32 million
- Box office: $31.8 million

Bad Times at the El Royale is a 2018 American neo-noir thriller film written, directed, and co-produced by Drew Goddard. The film stars Jeff Bridges, Cynthia Erivo, Dakota Johnson, Jon Hamm, Cailee Spaeny, Lewis Pullman, and Chris Hemsworth. The hyperlink-style film follows six strangers and an employee at the El Royale, a hotel located along the California–Nevada border, whose secrets intersect on a night in the late 1960s. The film explores themes of morality, faith, and redemption, with the state border and other visual elements symbolizing the concept of right and wrong.

Goddard began writing the spec script for the film in November 2016, and compiled a list of songs into his screenplay. After telling major studios to avoid buying the script if they could not buy the licenses for each piece of music, he sold it to 20th Century Fox in March 2017. Principal photography began on January 29, 2018, with cinematographer Seamus McGarvey, and concluded on April 6. The El Royale hotel was built entirely on a studio set in Burnaby, under the supervision of production designer Martin Whist, who had envisioned designing a perfectly symmetrical hotel. During post-production, editing was completed by Lisa Lassek and the musical score was composed by Michael Giacchino. The marketing campaign for the film included posters, trailers, and television advertisements, stylized to evoke nostalgia for the noir genre and to make it stand out against other films in theaters.

Bad Times at the El Royale premiered at Grauman's Chinese Theatre in Los Angeles on September 22, 2018, and was theatrically released in the United States on October 12. The film underperformed at the box office, grossing $31.8 million against its $32 million production budget. It received mixed-to-positive reviews from critics, who praised Giacchino's score, performances of the cast, and McGarvey's cinematography, but criticized its pacing, runtime, character beats, and Goddard's writing. At the 45th Saturn Awards, the film received five nominations, Best Writing for Goddard, Best Actor for Bridges, Best Supporting Actor for Pullman, Best Supporting Actress for Erivo, and won for Best Thriller Film.

== Plot ==
The El Royale, once popular with the wealthy until losing its gambling license, is a hotel that straddles the California–Nevada border. In 1959, Felix O'Kelly hides a money bag under the floorboards of his room. His accomplice arrives and shoots him dead. A decade later, Catholic priest Daniel Flynn, singer Darlene Sweet, salesman Laramie Seymour Sullivan, and hippie Emily Summerspring arrive at the hotel, now run solely by heroin addict Miles Miller, and book separate rooms.

Upon checking into the honeymoon suite, Laramie begins removing wiretaps but unexpectedly finds a second set as well. After stealing the hotel's master key, he discovers a secret corridor where every room can be observed through one-way mirrors and filmed with a camera. Laramie sees Darlene singing, Daniel removing the floorboards of his room, and Emily holding a young woman captive. In the parking lot, Laramie calls into the FBI, revealing himself to be Special Agent Dwight Broadbeck. He is instructed by J. Edgar Hoover to focus on his mission of collecting the surveillance materials the FBI had planted and ignore the kidnapping. Believing the mission has been compromised, Dwight is advised to prevent the guests from leaving. To do so, Dwight disables their cars.

Daniel invites Darlene to join him for dinner in the hotel lounge. There, Darlene says she is practicing for a performance in Reno and Daniel reveals his memory is deteriorating. While he is getting drinks, she sees him spiking her beverage and knocks him unconscious with a bottle. Miles later finds and revives Daniel, telling him that he wants to undertake a confession but Daniel refuses. Miles, looking for the missing master key, leads Daniel to the secret corridor, explaining that he used to regularly film intimate encounters that he had to send to his superiors. Miles also admits to having withheld one incriminating film of a deceased public figure who had been kind to him. When Daniel leaves to evaluate said film, Miles witnesses through the one-way mirror Dwight attempting to rescue Emily's hostage, revealed to be her younger sister, Rose. When Emily kills Dwight with a shotgun, it also shoots out the mirror, exposing the corridor and injuring Miles.

Before these events, Emily had forcibly removed her sister from a dangerous cult, led by Billy Lee. In the present, Rose secretly calls Billy to tell him where she is. A witness to Dwight's murder, Darlene tries to escape by car but fails due to his tampering with her vehicle. Daniel enters her car and reveals to her that he is Donald "Dock" O'Kelly, imprisoned since a botched armored truck robbery in 1959. Recently paroled, he arrived in disguise to retrieve the money hidden by his brother Felix, but due to his failing memory, he picked the wrong room and tried to drug Darlene to gain access to hers. To earn her trust, he offers to split the cash with her. They retrieve the money, but Billy and his cult arrive and take them, Emily, and Miles hostage.

In a flashback, Billy preaches to his cult how people are forced to choose sides by getting Rose to fight another girl for the chance to sleep with him as Emily watches nearby. In the present, a compliant Rose watches Billy as he interrogates the group and finds the film, which he realizes is more valuable than the money. He forces Emily to choose a color in a game of roulette between her and Miles, and kills her when she loses. Before Billy completes another round of roulette, Dock attacks him, a melee ensues, and a fire spreads. When Darlene implores a shell-shocked Miles to help, he reveals that he served in the Vietnam War as a sniper. Miles picks up a gun and kills Billy and his followers, but a distraught Rose stabs him in the stomach before being shot by Dock. Darlene convinces "Father Flynn" to absolve Miles of the guilt over his wartime actions before he dies. They then toss the film into the fire and leave with the money. Sometime later, in Reno, Dock attends Darlene's soul performance at a casino lounge.

== Cast ==
- Jeff Bridges as Father Daniel Flynn / Donald "Dock" O'Kelly
- Cynthia Erivo as singer Darlene Sweet
- Dakota Johnson as hippie Emily Summerspring
- Jon Hamm as traveling salesman Laramie Seymour Sullivan / Special Agent Dwight Broadbeck
- Lewis Pullman as hotel manager Miles Miller
- Chris Hemsworth as cult leader Billy Lee
- Cailee Spaeny as cult member Rose Summerspring, Emily's sister
- Nick Offerman as bank robber Felix O'Kelly
- Xavier Dolan as music producer Buddy Sunday
- Shea Whigham as Dr. Woodbury Laurence
- Mark O'Brien as bank robber Larsen Rogers
- Charles Halford as prisoner Sammy Wilds
- Jim O'Heir as emcee Milton Wyrick
- Stephen Stanton as the voice of J. Edgar Hoover
- Rebecca Toolan as Helen Gandy
- Manny Jacinto as cult member Waring "Wade" Espiritu
- William B. Davis as Judge Gordon Hoffman

== Themes and analysis ==
=== Deconstruction ===
As Kyle Kizu from The Hollywood Reporter notes, writer and director Drew Goddard's filmography has deconstructed genres several times. Focusing on the 2018 film, he said it was the filmmaker's "most controlled and fruitful piece of deconstruction" as it was able to present its thesis, of "what looks plain and ordinary hides something beneath", with its opening scene through a literal metaphor of a man deconstructing a room. While The A.V. Club's Katie Rife noted that the film attempted to deconstruct its neo-noir genre, but that it was instead "a structurally ambitious example of same", Matthew Razak of Flixist wrote that the film purposely avoided deconstructing its main genre as it "mashes together a whole wealth of genres and delivers an utterly unique, unpredictable, and unexpected movie that never stays still long enough to be anything but itself". In a negative light, Andrew Paredes from News.ABS-CBN.com said that the film's runtime made it difficult to analyze, and that the film could have been "both a deconstruction and a commentary" or neither, and that only Goddard could say. When asked if he had focused on deconstructing the genres in his film like he previously did with the horror-comedy The Cabin in the Woods in 2011, Goddard said "It's funny because in both cases that was not conscious either way. I just sort of go with what feels right for the story. Cabin was very aggressive in its approach. Whereas, in this case, [...] it just sort of came out inherently. I didn't want to make it about the genre."

=== Right and wrong ===
A major aspect of the film was its visualization of each character's morality. One of its main cues to this was the presence of the California–Nevada border dividing the hotel. In one of the opening scenes, Darlene Sweet takes her time walking across the state line and crosses it only with the help of Father Daniel Flynn, never actually stepping on the line itself. However, characters such as cult leader Billy Lee calmly walk in between the line without a second thought. To further illustrate this idea, cinematographer Seamus McGarvey used color to give each character a "photographic signature". With this process, he assigned Billy to the color red for the significance of "impending doom, blood, and death", black and white to Daniel to tell his distinctions between the truth and deception, and bright colors to Darlene for her character's hopefulness and purity. Goddard said he placed the story in 1969 due to the circumstances and tensions during the decade while drawing inspiration on morality from the techniques used by the Coen brothers.

=== Crisis of faith ===
"The film's purgatory also functions as a microcosm of an America trying to get a grip on its sins from the 1960s; Richard Nixon, J. Edgar Hoover, cruelly casual racism, roguish celebrities, doomed Hollywood starlets, hippie cult leaders, gruesome random murders, and the Vietnam War are all in the story's background. In their own ways, each of the characters represents some element of that decade."

— Alissa Wilkinson

Alissa Wilkinson from Vox said the film's themes tackled "religion, salvation, and who we really are" and that the film was about "humanity's drive to find redemption". Believing that the state line served as the "existential crossroads" each character was facing, she came to the conclusion that the hotel was a "stand-in for purgatory". She noted that the main point of the use of religion in the film was the idea that confessing would help the characters "[speak] freely about their past misdeeds in time for someone else to see them for who they really are". Tracy Palmer, from Signal Horizon, similarly evaluated the story and arrived at the assumption that Daniel was, in fact, God testing six people in purgatory, and as "Darlene never commits any sin beyond hating herself and aiding a criminal find his money [...] she is rewarded for her charity, and acceptance of self by singing for an audience what she wants, how she wants to look for eternity."

The Hollywood Reporter's Ciara Wardlow said the film had "a lot to say about faith". She began her analysis with the mention that the reveal of Daniel not being a priest but bank robber Dock O'Kelly as being similar to "other invocations of religion" turning out to be misleading. She explained the decision of Dwight Broadbeck to violate his orders to potentially rescue a kidnapping victim, as his attempt to do what is right after reciting to his daughter a revised version of the prayer "Now I Lay Me Down to Sleep". After concluding that all the characters in the film were having their faith tested, such as Miles Miller seeking forgiveness for his sins and Billy playing God as a cult leader, Wardlow cited Pascal's wager to summarize the major theme of the project: "Bad Times repeatedly asks what is 'goodness' even, or forgiveness? And who is qualified to give it, for that matter?"

Furthermore, a journalist named Jasmine from SSZee Media studied the film and wrote that it was "a study of religion" as every character was having a "crisis of faith". Focusing on the introduction of Billy Lee and how he uses religion to take advantage of his followers and to pose as a God himself, "walking the line between good and evil", Jasmine noted the similarity of his followers to the "disciples following Jesus". Also analyzing a scene in which a shot was framed to make Billy appear to have a halo on his head, she interpreted that his character was created to focus more on threatening appearances through his movements and words, calling it "the performance of Chris Hemsworth's career".

=== Film reel ===
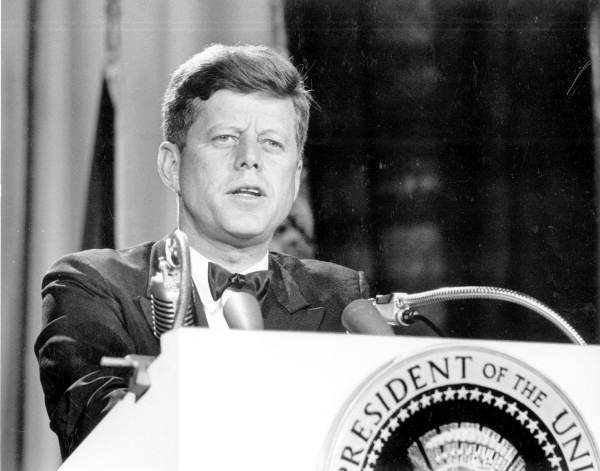
Rumors surrounding the personal life of John F. Kennedy influenced the presence of the film reel.

A film reel containing a recently deceased person in an intimate act is destroyed in the film's finale. The choice to never tell the audience the identity of the person on the film was examined by both critics and filmgoers. Screen Rant's Zak Wojnar said the scene would lead the audience to question "if it should actually matter." He said it was possible the person on the film was John F. Kennedy, Robert F. Kennedy, or Martin Luther King Jr., major political figures who were all assassinated in the 1960s. In his conclusion, Wojnar said the "key takeaway of the film is that great men aren't perfect. Good people can do bad things, bad people can do good things, and there's more to human beings than the binary poles of righteous and wicked."

Lia Beck from Bustle, on the other hand, closely examined the possibility of JFK being the person on the film, as he had been rumored to have had an affair with Marilyn Monroe in the 1960s, who appears in the film through a photograph. She also pointed out that the hotel the El Royale is based on, the Cal Neva Lodge & Casino, was frequently visited by the Kennedy family. Goddard said his choice to leave the person on the tape ambiguous was to move the focus on Darlene, her rant towards Billy, and her character as a whole.

== Production ==
=== Development ===
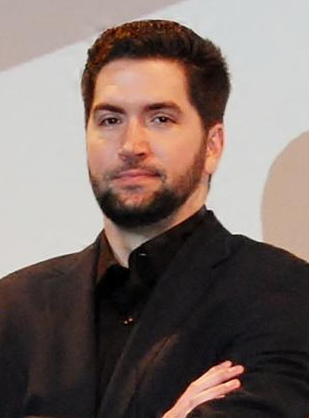
Drew Goddard wrote, directed, and produced the film as his "love letter to the crime thriller" genre.

In November 2016, Goddard began writing the spec script for Bad Times at the El Royale, his next project after earning an Academy Award nomination for adapting The Martian (2015). To prepare for the film financially, he pitched the project with a budget and a selection of songs he wanted to be included. 20th Century Fox, who produced The Martian, bought the screenplay on March 8, 2017, agreeing to his terms and setting the budget at $32 million. According to The Hollywood Reporter, the script was only given to top studio executives, with potential buyers having to read it off a tablet before returning it to a courier. Goddard was also attached to direct for Goddard Textiles, producing alongside Jeremy Latcham. Mary McLaglen was an executive producer.

Gumbo is the perfect way to describe it. I love crime fiction, I love film noir, I love big ensemble movies, I love 60s music. So much of this movie is about my love for the music of the 1960s and wanting to celebrate the artistic revolution that was happening. I take all of those things and throw it into the gumbo pot, spice it up with a little [of] my own stuff, and out comes El Royale.

— Goddard at New York Comic Con

The El Royale was influenced by the Cal Neva Lodge & Casino, a hotel located in between the California–Nevada border. Goddard said he wanted to work with an ensemble cast after finishing The Martian with lead actor Matt Damon because he "wanted to play around with a large cast so that you don't know who the protagonist is." On further inspirations, Goddard said his cast and crew watched several films throughout the film's production, including Casablanca (1942), Out of the Past (1947), Chinatown (1974), and Barton Fink (1991), along with reading several novels from Jim Thompson, Agatha Christie, Dashiell Hammett, James Ellroy, and Flannery O'Connor. He also compared the film to The Good Place, a television comedy series he executive produced, saying they were "two sides of the same coin. They're both about characters struggling to be better people and trying to figure out what it means to be a better person. One is a very broad comedy, the other is a dark noir. But at the core, they are about characters."

=== Casting ===
Goddard chose to spend more time developing his characters than looking for actors who would best fit the roles. Jeff Bridges was the first person to receive the script, and on August 23, 2017, it was announced he had been in negotiations to star alongside Chris Hemsworth, who previously worked with the director on The Cabin in the Woods. Actors who were also being considered for lead roles included Beyoncé, Tom Holland, and newcomer Cailee Spaeny; the latter was officially cast on August 24.

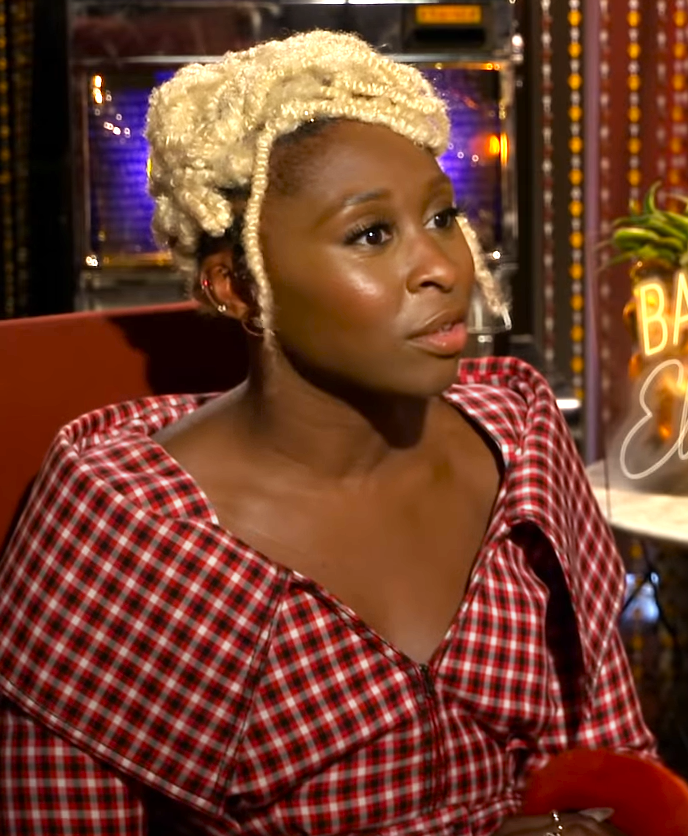
Cynthia Erivo plays soul singer Darlene Sweet. She was cast in the singing role in August 2017 and helped Goddard develop a scene.

Cynthia Erivo was first considered for a lead role while working on Widows. She submitted two audition tapes to casting director Carmen Cuba and was cast on August 29, 2017. When asked about Erivo's audition process, Goddard said he "felt the hair stand up on the back of my neck. It was pretty exciting the day she walked in, that's for sure." Erivo would go on to help Goddard write her character's climactic monologue directed at Hemsworth's character, Billy Lee, explaining that as the only lead character who is a woman of color, that if her character "doesn't have a moment where she can just speak, it will seem as though we don't want her to".

In January 2018, Dakota Johnson joined the film; Russell Crowe signed on to star but dropped out shortly before filming began. To quickly find his replacement, Jon Hamm was contacted while attending the 2018 Sundance Film Festival and given two days to read the screenplay and decide whether he wanted to star. After accepting, he had less than a week to remember fourteen pages of dialogue before filming began. Hamm noted a major reason he accepted to star was to work with Bridges and said, "I've wanted to work with [Bridges] since I was in college or even younger. So to get that opportunity, you gotta jump with both feet". In February, Nick Offerman and Mark O'Brien were spotted on set. Lewis Pullman was confirmed to star in May 2018. On casting Pullman, Goddard said "it was one of those good old-fashioned casting searches. After meeting with lots and lots and lots of actors, Lewis came in and you just felt that immediately. The last time that happened, quite honestly, was when Chris Hemsworth walked in for The Cabin in the Woods. You're just looking for actors who inherently fit the role—and then also transcend the role. Lewis had that sort of magic."

=== Filming and design ===
==== Costumes ====
Costume designer Danny Glicker created each character's attire and found Goddard's "visual vocabulary" to be "playful and sharp". Glicker said his job was to create "real tension" in each character "between their outward appearance and who they really are". To create the design for Hamm's character, a salesman, Glicker and his production crew researched different types of salespeople and used the documentary Salesman (1969) as inspiration, before deciding that his attire, described as being "very American", would change as the temperature in the film changed as well. On the other hand, the clothing of Erivo's character, lounge singer Darlene Sweet, was purposely created to look imperfect to reflect her declining career. Glicker said he had to screen test each piece of clothing due to conditions presented in the film, such as the weather, environment, and lighting, and that he spent time at the library researching different types of clothing from the 1960s. Summarizing his work, Glicker felt that actors wearing his created costumes were "infused with truthful information [...] to experience that character's life without inhibition".

==== Principal photography ====
Principal photography took place between January 29 and April 6, 2018, in areas around Vancouver, British Columbia, where an incentive was given in the form of a 28% refundable tax credit. The film was shot under the working title Purple Harvest and filmed in chronological order to improve continuity. After working on The Greatest Showman (2017), Seamus McGarvey was hired to bring out the "1960s look" and "beautiful colors" of each set. Shot with Kodak 35 mm film with a Panaflex XL camera on a 2.39:1 aspect ratio, McGarvey used Panavision C Series and E series anamorphic lenses to capture the film.

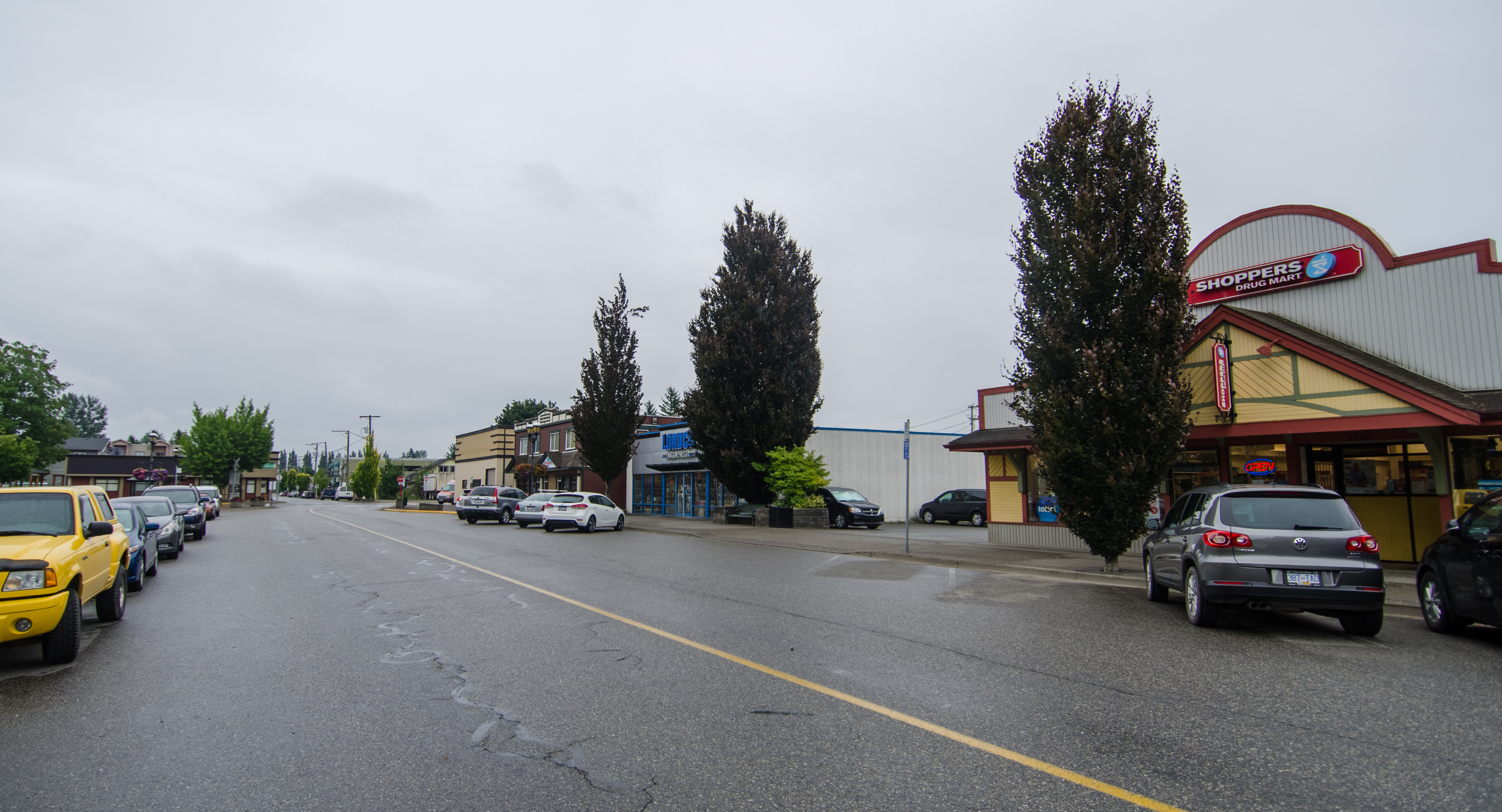
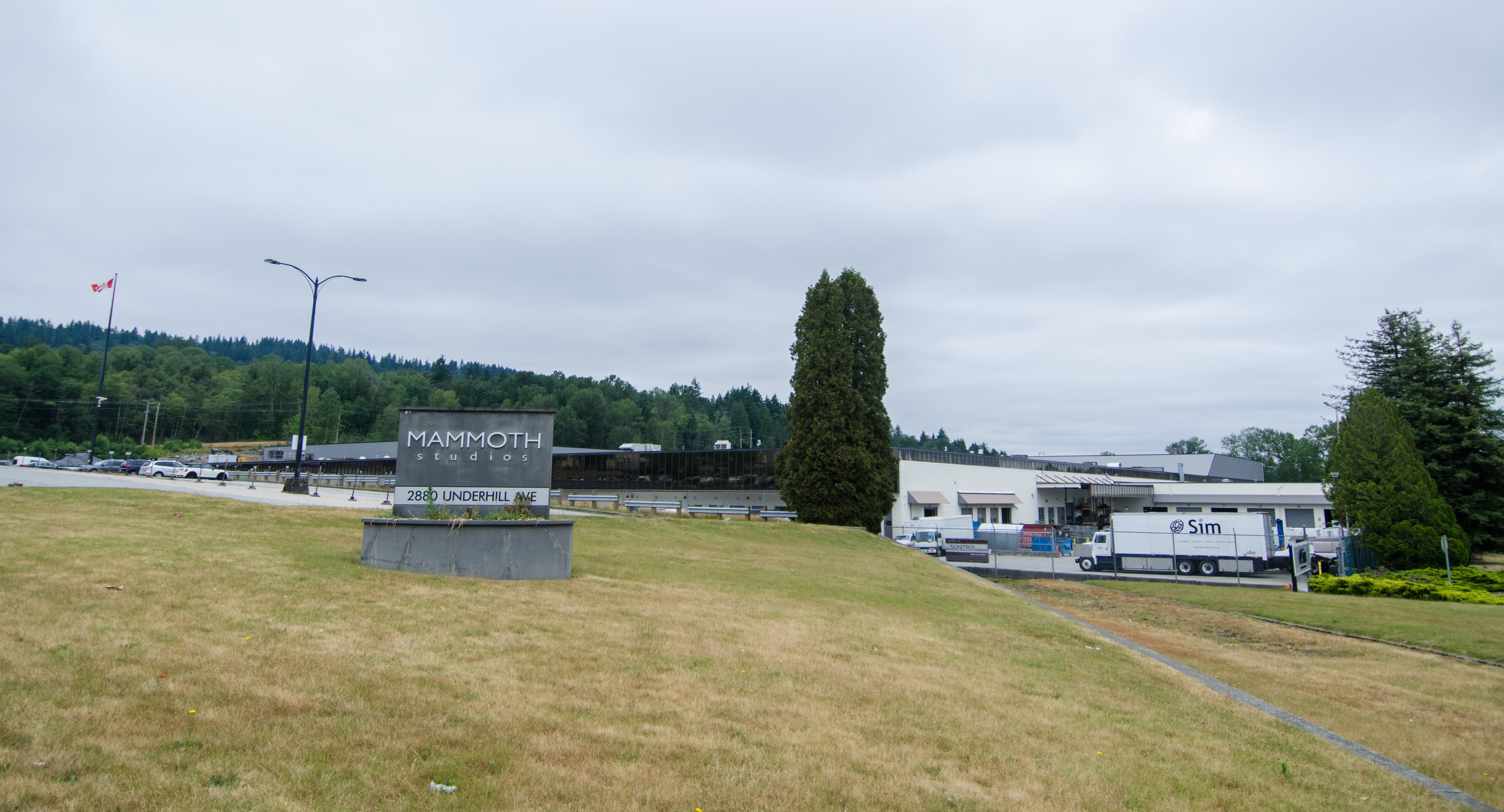
Principal photography took place in the Canadian province of British Columbia. Filming locations included Pioneer Avenue in Agassiz (top) and Burnaby's Mammoth Studios (bottom).

Several actors took pay cuts to complete the project and allow the production to "take big creative bets". For the first few days of the shoot, filming for the main bank robbery sequence took place in Pioneer Avenue in Agassiz, British Columbia. The following week, cast members were moved to Mammoth Studios, a 60,000-square-foot (5,600 m^{2}) sound stage in Burnaby featuring a 10,000-square-foot (930 m^{2}) set of the El Royale. Early in the production, the film crew realized they could not find a real place with perfect symmetry to film, and Goddard also wanted the weather to be controllable, thus the decision to build the set in Burnaby. The set was created under the supervision of production designer Martin Whist, who had previously worked with Goddard on Cloverfield (2008) and The Cabin in the Woods. Each hotel room of the set was designed to be unique to each character, particularly through their wallpaper, with Darlene's room being the most vibrant.

It took eight months to plan a tracking shot in which Hamm's character discovers the secret corridor of the El Royale and watches the hotel guests through one-way mirrors. Rehearsals of the scene began in November 2017, with the cast working with a model of the hotel and small figurines to research how to perfect the timing. Due to the complexity of the scene, in which Erivo was singing live for the five-minute continuous shot, cast and crew members had to move silently in unison while wearing "padded shoes and quiet clothes". Using "30% reflective glass" for the one-way mirrors, the scene took an entire day between twenty-seven takes to accomplish. An additional scene in which Erivo's character sings to cover up noises caused by Bridges's character took twenty takes to complete. Furthermore, the set of a scene involving Billy Lee and his cult talking around a bonfire was built outside the parking lot of the hotel set.

The scene showing the first interaction between Daniel and Darlene was one of the last scenes shot for the film as it was built on location to have the scene occur during the day; every other scene taking place inside the hotel was shot on the set at Mammoth Studios. The film's climax scene in which the hotel burns down was planned using fire retardant materials by Whist's brother Joel, a special effects coordinator. The last scenes that were shot for the film involved flashbacks; the Vietnam War scene, originally going to be shot in Thailand, was filmed at the Pölsa Rosa Movie Ranch in Acton, California, while the FBI scene, doctor's office scene, and jail scene were shot in an armory from the Canadian Army. Additional filming in Los Angeles and north of Malibu, California, took place for three days when scenes involving a flower walk and a beach were shot. McGarvey said he used a wide aspect ratio to shine focus on the ensemble cast.

=== Editing ===
Lisa Lassek edited the film using Avid Media Composer; she previously worked with Goddard on The Cabin in the Woods. Lassek said she had to wait for the film stock to travel to Los Angeles, where it was processed and returned to Vancouver. As a result, Lassek was permitted to edit the project as filming took place while in a workspace above the set. Due to the delay, the footage shown in the film on television monitors was shot first so the original film stock could be projected on said monitors weeks later. After post-production concluded near the start of October 2018, the finished product reached an Avid DNxHD 115 resolution. On working with the director, she said there were various "scenes that, in the script, were particularly memorable. It was really the way Drew shot them that took them to a whole [new] level."

=== Soundtrack ===
Goddard wrote each song into his screenplay before pitching it for an "organic process of structuring the film and the songs" and told major studios to avoid buying the script if they could not buy the licenses for each piece of music. He described the film as "a love letter to music" and served as a music supervisor. Goddard had Erivo sing her songs live on set with the belief that without it, "the movie would not work". Goddard said that the music was "almost like the eighth character in the movie. It serves the function of a chorus in a Shakespearean play. It actually is a key part of the emotional fabric of the film." As a result, the production crew had each song playing during filming on loudspeakers; Pullman and Bridges said they had originally read the script while listening to the songs in the background as a "great way to set the tone". In introducing the character of cult leader Billy Lee with "Twelve Thirty", Goddard said he wanted to provide a metaphorical connection with the character, as the song is "very bright and seductive, but when you really listen to what the words are saying, there's an incredible darkness".

The film score was composed by Michael Giacchino, who had met Goddard while working on television series Alias and Lost. Both the score and its accompanying soundtrack album were released on digital download by Milan Records and Republic Records, on October 12, 2018. The original tracklist for the soundtrack featured eleven prerecorded songs, while a digital re-release on November 30, 2018, included two additional songs; "This Old Heart of Mine (Is Weak for You)" and "Hold On, I'm Comin'", performed by Erivo in the film. Following its re-release, the soundtrack received positive reviews from critics. Polygon's Karen Han called it "one of the year's best". Angelica Florio from Bustle said that "between the music [...] and Darlene's show-stopping performances, you definitely get the sense that the song selection was key for Goddard".

== Marketing ==
External videos
- Official trailer of Bad Times at the El Royale on 20th Century Fox's YouTube channel

The marketing campaign from 20th Century Fox for Bad Times at the El Royale began on May 29, 2018, when "exclusive" images of the project were released and Drew Goddard said "real-life historical figures could turn up at the El Royale". A teaser for the film was publicized on June 7, 2018, with Entertainment Weekly calling it a "tense first look" and IndieWire comparing its premise to Clue (1985) and the television series Room 104. On August 28, an official trailer was released, which Collider described as "fantastic" as it was "more delightful for the fact that it reveals pretty much nothing beyond the basic setup and the idea that none of these strangers is who they at first appear to be". In a trailer breakdown with Empire, who described it as an "instant blast of glossy genre intrigue", Goddard revealed the names of each character and said, "If it was really up to me, I'd say the less you know the better. I take very great care in giving the audience something they've never seen before and surprising the audience, and taking them to places that they do not expect to go."

Promotional and theatrical posters for the film were released extensively to broadcast the ensemble cast. On June 26, 2018, eight character posters were unveiled by the studio, with Ben Pearson from /Film noting the "progression of the setting sun" and "how the amount of light in each poster seems to mirror what we know about the characters so far". On August 13, seven additional character posters along with an official theatrical poster were released featuring "closeups of the brooding main characters lit by the title's neon glow". On August 28, a second theatrical poster was publicized to coincide with the release of the official trailer.

Television spots began airing on September 4, 2018. In the week starting September 17, seven commercials made 223.4 million impressions across 28 networks, particularly on NBC and FOX. In the final week of September, Bad Times at the El Royale had eleven versions of similar advertisements aired 773 times nationwide, gaining an attention score of 93.42 (as well as an attention index of 109). In the first week of October, eighteen commercials made over 378 million impressions. With its following week from October 8 to October 14 being its last time as one of the top five projects with the highest commercial spending, twenty-two commercials aired a total of 1,331 times on 34 networks, specifically on Adult Swim and NBC, bringing the film's overall television advertisement spending to $24.46 million. On December 21, 2018, a 10-minute "extended preview" scene of the film was released, with Collider questioning the studio's decision, writing that it was "something they should have done back in October, but it is what it is".

The Hollywood Reporter's Chris Thilk analyzed the marketing techniques of Bad Times at the El Royale, summarizing the fact that the studio was "[betting] on noir nostalgia" to attract audiences. In what he believed was "established neon-heavy branding", Thilk said each of the released posters was "hinting in some way toward the nature or arc" of each character. On the trailers, he wrote that viewers were unable to "describe what's going" and were left "raising lots of questions". After discussing the initial footage being released at CinemaCon and San Diego Comic-Con, where filmgoers were also allowed to enter a lottery for the chance of seeing an exclusive screening of the film, Thilk tackled the various clips, featurettes, and television spots produced to advertise the film. In his summary, he wrote that the marketing campaign "promoted a strong cast and a wicked sense of humor", and that 20th Century Fox "has embraced that to sell it to those looking for something a bit different at the theater".

== Release ==
=== Theatrical ===
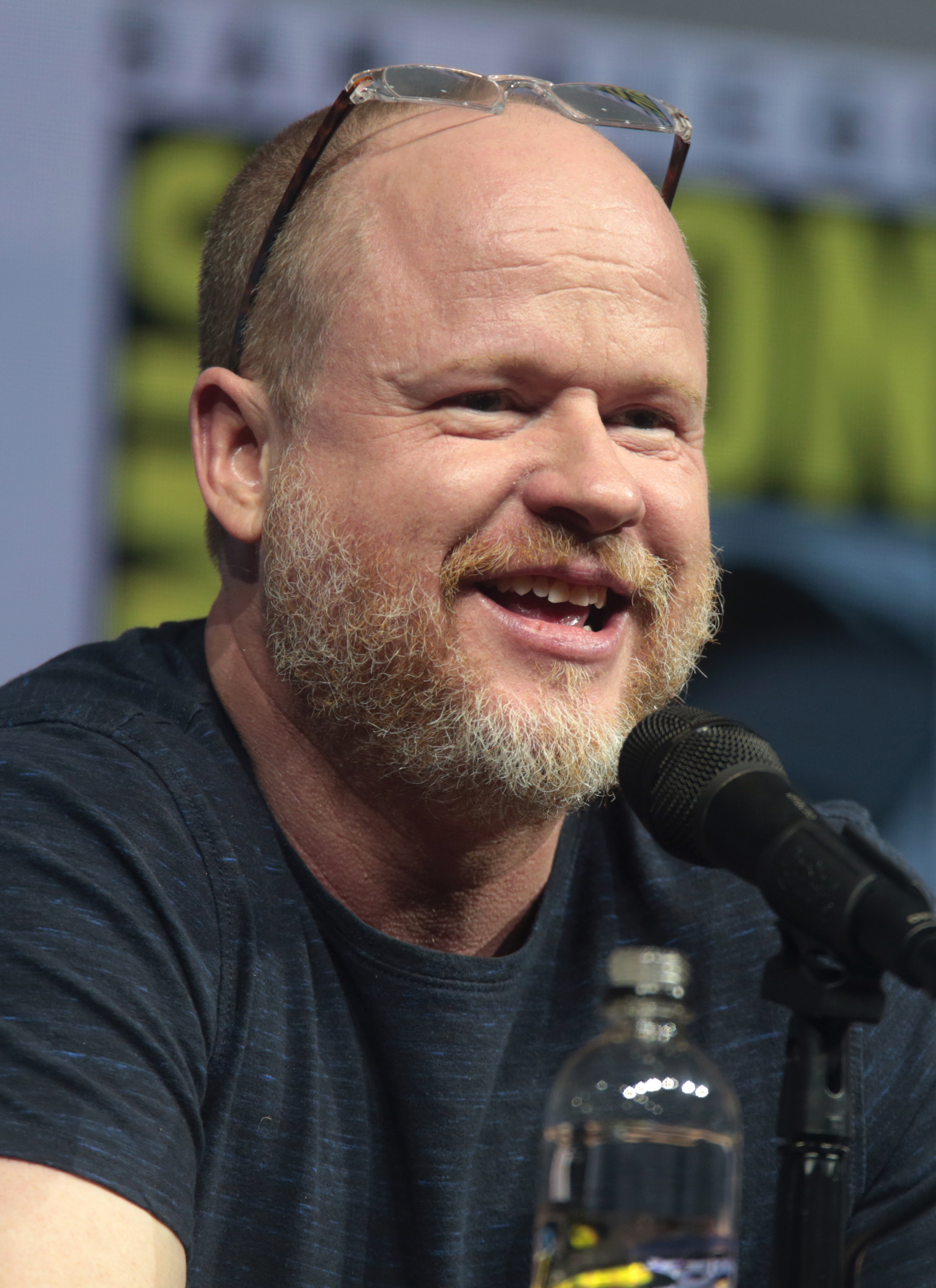
Joss Whedon, who previously collaborated with Goddard, attended the film's premiere and praised it.

Bad Times at the El Royale premiered at the TCL Chinese Theatre in Hollywood, Los Angeles, on September 22, 2018. It was attended by its crew, cast, and fellow filmmakers and actors including Manny Jacinto, Alvina August, Stefan Kapičić, Bill Pullman (the father of actor Lewis Pullman, who stars in the film), and Joss Whedon along with 20th Century Fox chairman and CEO Stacey Snider and vice chairman Chris Aronson. At the opening, Whedon gave the film positive feedback, having previously worked with Goddard on writing The Cabin in the Woods, and said of the finished product, "It's gritty, it's hard-edged, but it's adorable." The film was one of the last screened projects at Fantastic Fest in Austin, Texas, and later had its world premiere in Spain, out of competition, at the San Sebastián International Film Festival.

The film's runtime of 141 minutes was chosen after negative scores appeared during test screenings where audiences were given a viewing of the film with a shorter runtime. It was initially scheduled for release on October 5, 2018, but was later postponed to October 12. This shift was reportedly made to avoid competition with the October 5 releases of Venom and A Star Is Born. After it opened in theaters, the film was chosen to introduce the 13th Rome Film Festival, serving as its Italian premiere. At the ceremony, Goddard said his film contained "parallels to the #MeToo movement" on the topic of abusing power.

=== Home media ===
20th Century Fox Home Entertainment released the film on Digital HD via digital distribution on December 18, 2018, before giving it a physical release on Ultra HD Blu-ray, Blu-ray, and DVD on January 1, 2019. Special features on the physical release include several featurettes, a 28-minute making-of documentary, both trailers, and an image gallery. In separate reviews, Chris Evangelista from /Film and Adam Chitwood from Collider both expressed their disappointment at the lack of an audio commentary track from the director.

== Reception ==
=== Box office ===
Bad Times at the El Royale grossed $17.8 million in the United States and Canada, and $14 million in other territories, for a worldwide total of $31.9 million against a production budget of $32 million. A box-office bomb, its performance was attributed to its runtime, competition, and R rating from the Motion Picture Association.

Box office analytics projected the film would make $8–12 million in its opening weekend from 2,808 theaters, with some "ambitious estimates" going as high as $17 million. Bad Times at the El Royale earned $2.8 million on its first day (including $575,000 from Thursday night previews) and went on to debut to $7.1 million in its opening weekend, finishing seventh at the box office. Opening below initial estimates, Deadline Hollywood noted the fact that the film had made less in its first weekend than Night School in its third. Audiences during the film's opening weekend were 53% male and 73% above the age of 25. In its second weekend, the film made $3.4 million and dropped to ninth place at the box office. The film was pulled from theaters in the U.S. and Canada on December 6, 2018.

Worldwide, Bad Times at the El Royale debuted in 36 markets, making $4 million in its opening weekend; the top countries were Russia ($913,000), Australia ($884,000), the United Kingdom ($620,000), and Germany ($315,000). The film earned $2.5 million in its second weekend and $1.63 million in its third from 49 markets.

=== Critical response ===
On the review aggregator website Rotten Tomatoes, 74% of 256 critics' reviews are positive, with an average rating of 6.7/10. The website's critical consensus reads, "Smart, stylish, and packed with solid performances, Bad Times at the El Royale delivers pure popcorn fun with the salty tang of social subtext." Metacritic, which uses a weighted average, assigned the film a score of 60 out of 100, based on 43 critics, indicating "mixed or average" reviews. Audiences polled by CinemaScore gave the film an average grade of "B-" on an A+ to F scale.

The film was criticized for its runtime, character beats, and pacing. Additionally, Goddard's screenplay for the film received mixed reviews, with some praising it for its dialogue and use of violence, others comparing it to Quentin Tarantino's Pulp Fiction (1994) and Stanley Kubrick's The Killing (1956), and several critics finding its third act failed to deliver the ending it was building towards. From NPR, Simon Abrams noted Goddard's directorial style, and how he was able to keep his "hyper-compartmentalized plot moving forward so swiftly" despite its moments of tension and significant plot points. On the other hand, Glenn Kenny from RogerEbert.com did not enjoy the film's finale, writing that it was "an unfortunately apt demonstration of what can befall a clever filmmaker who gets too clever".

Other aspects of the film, such as its soundtrack and cinematography, received praise. Critics agreed that McGarvey's cinematography made the film visually appealing because of its composition and color palette. The film's performances, also received praise and were mostly well received. While The A.V. Club's Katie Rife criticized Spaeny's character, she praised Erivo's monologue near the climax of the film. Collider's Adam Chitwood said Erivo's acting made Bad Times at the El Royale "one of the best films of the year". Writing for Entertainment Weekly, Leah Greenblatt gave praise to Erivo for her "steely charisma and gorgeous powerhouse of a voice". Abrams also gave positive feedback to the film for its ability to give each member of the ensemble cast enough time to act out their "best," with Manohla Dargis from The New York Times writing that "the performances and the visual style keep you easily engaged [...] Goddard keeps everything smoothly, ebbing and flowing as the characters separate and join together, but at some point [...] you want something more substantial".

=== Accolades ===
For her performance, Erivo received nominations for the Black Reel Award for Outstanding Breakthrough Performance, Female, the London Film Critics' Circle Award for Supporting Actress of the Year, and the Washington D.C. Area Film Critics Association Award for Best Supporting Actress. A member of the British Society of Cinematographers, McGarvey was nominated by the organization for Best Cinematography in a Theatrical Feature Film. The film was also nominated at the Golden Trailer Awards for Best Home Ent Horror/Thriller and received a San Diego Film Critics Society award nomination for Best Use of Music in a Film. At the 45th Saturn Awards, it received Best Thriller Film and nominations for Best Writing (Goddard), Best Actor (Bridges), Best Supporting Actor (Pullman), and Best Supporting Actress (Erivo).
