= List of Avid DNxHD resolutions =

This is a list of Avid DNxHD resolutions, mainly available in multiple HD encoding resolutions based on the frame size and frame rate of the media being encoded. The list below shows the available encoding choices for each of the available frame size and frame rate combinations.

Its sister codec, Avid DNxHR, supports resolutions beyond FullHD.

== 1080 ==
=== 1080p60 ===
Resolution	Frame Size	Chroma Subsampling	Bits	Frames Per Second	Megabits per second	Minutes per Gigabyte
Avid DNxHD 440x	1920 x 1080	4:2:2	10	60	440	0.325
Avid DNxHD 440	1920 x 1080	4:2:2	8	60	440	0.325
Avid DNxHD 290	1920 x 1080	4:2:2	8	60	291	0.492
Avid DNxHD 90	1920 x 1080	4:2:2	8	60	90	1.585

=== 1080p59.94 ===
Resolution	Frame Size	Chroma Subsampling	Bits	Frames Per Second	Megabits per second	Minutes per Gigabyte
Avid DNxHD 440x	1920 x 1080	4:2:2	10	59.94	440	0.325
Avid DNxHD 440	1920 x 1080	4:2:2	8	59.94	440	0.325
Avid DNxHD 290	1920 x 1080	4:2:2	8	59.94	291	0.493
Avid DNxHD 90	1920 x 1080	4:2:2	8	59.94	90	1.585

=== 1080p50 ===
Resolution	Frame Size	Chroma Subsampling	Bits	Frames Per Second	Megabits per second	Minutes per Gigabyte
Avid DNxHD 365x	1920 x 1080	4:2:2	10	50	367	0.390
Avid DNxHD 365	1920 x 1080	4:2:2	8	50	367	0.390
Avid DNxHD 240	1920 x 1080	4:2:2	8	50	242	0.590
Avid DNxHD 75	1920 x 1080	4:2:2	8	50	75	1.900

=== 1080i59.94 ===
Resolution	Frame Size	Chroma Subsampling	Bits	Frames Per Second	Megabits per second	Minutes per Gigabyte
Avid DNxHD 220x	1920 x 1080	4:2:2	10	29.97	220	0.651
Avid DNxHD 220	1920 x 1080	4:2:2	8	29.97	220	0.651
Avid DNxHD 145	1920 x 1080	4:2:2	8	29.97	145	0.985
Avid DNxHD 100	1920 x 1080	4:2:2	8	29.97	100	1.429

=== 1080p29.97 ===
Resolution	Frame Size	Chroma Subsampling	Bits	Frames Per Second	Megabits per second	Minutes per Gigabyte
Avid DNxHD 440x	1920 x 1080	4:4:4	10	29.97	440	0.325
Avid DNxHD 220x	1920 x 1080	4:2:2	10	29.97	220	0.651
Avid DNxHD 220	1920 x 1080	4:2:2	8	29.97	220	0.651
Avid DNxHD 145	1920 x 1080	4:2:2	8	29.97	145	0.985
Avid DNxHD 100	1920 x 1080	4:2:2	8	29.97	100	1.429
Avid DNxHD 45	1920 x 1080	4:2:2	8	29.97	45	3.18

=== 1080i50 ===
Resolution	Frame Size	Chroma Subsampling	Bits	Frames Per Second	Megabits per second	Minutes per Gigabyte
Avid DNxHD 185x	1920 x 1080	4:2:2	10	25	184	0.78
Avid DNxHD 185	1920 x 1080	4:2:2	8	25	184	0.78
Avid DNxHD 120	1920 x 1080	4:2:2	8	25	121	1.713
Avid DNxHD 85	1920 x 1080	4:2:2	8	25	84	1.181

=== 1080p25 ===
Resolution	Frame Size	Chroma Subsampling	Bits	Frames Per Second	Megabits per second	Minutes per Gigabyte
Avid DNxHD 365x	1920 x 1080	4:4:4	10	25	367	0.39
Avid DNxHD 185x	1920 x 1080	4:2:2	10	25	184	0.78
Avid DNxHD 185	1920 x 1080	4:2:2	8	25	184	0.78
Avid DNxHD 120	1920 x 1080	4:2:2	8	25	121	1.181
Avid DNxHD 85	1920 x 1080	4:2:2	8	25	84	1.713
Avid DNxHD 36	1920 x 1080	4:2:2	8	25	36	3.98

=== 1080p24 ===
Resolution	Frame Size	Chroma Subsampling	Bits	Frames Per Second	Megabits per second	Minutes per Gigabyte
Avid DNxHD 350x	1920 x 1080	4:4:4	10	24	352	0.406
Avid DNxHD 175x	1920 x 1080	4:2:2	10	24	176	0.814
Avid DNxHD 175	1920 x 1080	4:2:2	8	24	176	0.814
Avid DNxHD 115	1920 x 1080	4:2:2	8	24	116	1.231
Avid DNxHD 80	1920 x 1080	4:2:2	8	24	80	1.785
Avid DNxHD 36	1920 x 1080	4:2:2	8	24	36	3.98

=== 1080p23.97 ===
Resolution	Frame Size	Chroma Subsampling	Bits	Frames Per Second	Megabits per second	Minutes per Gigabyte
Avid DNxHD 350x	1920 x 1080	4:4:4	10	23.976	352	0.407
Avid DNxHD 175x	1920 x 1080	4:2:2	10	23.976	176	0.814
Avid DNxHD 175	1920 x 1080	4:2:2	8	23.976	176	0.814
Avid DNxHD 115	1920 x 1080	4:2:2	8	23.976	116	1.231
Avid DNxHD 80	1920 x 1080	4:2:2	8	23.976	80	1.787
Avid DNxHD 36	1920 x 1080	4:2:2	8	23.976	36	3.98

== 720 ==
=== 720p59.94 ===
Resolution	Frame Size	Chroma Subsampling	Bits	Frames Per Second	Megabits per second	Minutes per Gigabyte
Avid DNxHD 220x	1280 x 720	4:2:2	10	59.94	220	0.651
Avid DNxHD 220	1280 x 720	4:2:2	8	59.94	220	0.651
Avid DNxHD 145	1280 x 720	4:2:2	8	59.94	145	0.985
Avid DNxHD 100	1280 x 720	4:2:2	8	59.94	100	1.402

=== 720p50 ===
Resolution	Frame Size	Chroma Subsampling	Bits	Frames Per Second	Megabits per second	Minutes per Gigabyte
Avid DNxHD 175x	1280 x 720	4:2:2	10	50	175	0.818
Avid DNxHD 175	1280 x 720	4:2:2	8	50	175	0.818
Avid DNxHD 115	1280 x 720	4:2:2	8	50	115	1.244
Avid DNxHD 85	1280 x 720	4:2:2	8	50	85	1.68

=== 720p29.97 ===
Resolution	Frame Size	Chroma Subsampling	Bits	Frames Per Second	Megabits per second	Minutes per Gigabyte
Avid DNxHD 110x	1280 x 720	4:2:2	10	29.97	110	1.3
Avid DNxHD 110	1280 x 720	4:2:2	8	29.97	110	1.3
Avid DNxHD 75	1280 x 720	4:2:2	8	29.97	72	2.05
Avid DNxHD 50	1280 x 720	4:2:2	8	29.97	51	2.8

=== 720p25 ===
Resolution	Frame Size	Chroma Subsampling	Bits	Frames Per Second	Megabits per second	Minutes per Gigabyte
Avid DNxHD 90x	1280 x 720	4:2:2	10	25	92	1.59
Avid DNxHD 90	1280 x 720	4:2:2	8	25	92	1.59
Avid DNxHD 60	1280 x 720	4:2:2	8	25	60	2.39
Avid DNxHD 45	1280 x 720	4:2:2	8	25	43	3.361

=== 720p23.97 ===
Resolution	Frame Size	Chroma Subsampling	Bits	Frames Per Second	Megabits per second	Minutes per Gigabyte
Avid DNxHD 90x	1280 x 720	4:2:2	10	23.976	92	1.566
Avid DNxHD 90	1280 x 720	4:2:2	8	23.976	92	1.566
Avid DNxHD 60	1280 x 720	4:2:2	8	23.976	60	2.381
Avid DNxHD 45	1280 x 720	4:2:2	8	23.976	43	3.504
