= Thunderbolt and Lightfoot =

1974 film directed by Michael Cimino

- Theatrical release poster, version #2
- Directed by: Michael Cimino
- Written by: Michael Cimino
- Produced by: Robert Daley
- Starring: Clint Eastwood; Jeff Bridges; George Kennedy
- Cinematography: Frank Stanley
- Edited by: Ferris Webster
- Music by: Dee Barton
- Production company: The Malpaso Company
- Distributed by: United Artists
- Release date: May 22, 1974 (Los Angeles)
- Running time: 115 minutes
- Country: United States
- Language: English
- Budget: $2.2–4 million or $2.2 million
- Box office: $25 million (U.S.)

Thunderbolt and Lightfoot is a 1974 American crime action comedy film written and directed by Michael Cimino in his directorial debut. Clint Eastwood stars as John "Thunderbolt" Doherty, a disguised preacher who is almost killed before being unintentionally rescued by a young car thief named "Lightfoot" (Jeff Bridges), who partners with him in a series of thefts. "Thunderbolt" is soon found to be a fugitive bank robber, who is being hunted by his former gang. George Kennedy and Geoffrey Lewis also feature.

Filmed in various locations of Montana, Thunderbolt and Lightfoot was produced by Eastwood's production company, Malpaso Productions, and released through United Artists. The film grossed $25 million at the box office on a budget of $2.2–4 million, and was positively received by critics. Bridges was nominated for the Academy Award for Best Supporting Actor for the film.

== Plot ==
A young ne'er-do-well who goes by the name Lightfoot cheerfully steals a car from an enraged dealer's lot. Elsewhere, an assassin attempts to shoot a preacher, who is delivering a sermon at his pulpit. The preacher escapes on foot. Lightfoot, who happens to be driving by, inadvertently rescues the preacher by running over his pursuer and giving the preacher a lift. They steal a series of cars, patronize prostitutes, and escape another attempt on their lives by two men.

Lightfoot learns that the "minister" John Doherty is a notorious bank robber, known as "the Thunderbolt" for his use of an Oerlikon 20 mm cannon to break into a safe, who has been hiding out in the guise of a clergyman following the robbery of a Montana bank. Thunderbolt tells Lightfoot that the members of his gang mistakenly think Thunderbolt double-crossed them and kept the money for himself. Thunderbolt is the only member of the gang who knows where the loot is hidden. Lightfoot and he journey to Warsaw, Montana, to retrieve the money hidden behind a chalkboard inside an old one-room school. They discover the schoolhouse has been replaced by a brand-new school with no indication of what happened to the previous school or its looted treasure.

Thunderbolt and Lightfoot are abducted by the men who were pursuing them — the vicious Red Leary and the gentle Eddie Goody. After being forced to drive to a remote location, Thunderbolt wins a fistfight with Red, after which Thunderbolt explains that he never betrayed the gang. Lightfoot proposes another heist, namely, robbing the same company as before, but without the gang's electronics expert Dunlop, whom Lightfoot hit and killed with his car. In the city where the bank is located, the men find jobs to raise money for needed equipment while they plan the heist.

When the robbery begins, Thunderbolt and Red hold the vault manager at gunpoint in his home and force him to reveal the access codes to the outer doors of the safe. Lightfoot, cross-dressing as a woman, distracts the Western Union office's security guard, deactivates the ensuing alarm, and is picked up by Goody. Like the first heist, Thunderbolt uses an antiaircraft cannon to breach the vault's wall, and the gang escapes with the loot. They flee in the car, with Red and Goody in the trunk, to a nearby drive-in movie in progress.

After hearing Red sneeze from the trunk and seeing a shirttail protruding from the trunk lid, the theater manager suspects someone is hiding in the trunk to avoid paying and so goes to investigate. As wailing police cars begin to close in on the drive-in theater and as the theater manager gets nearer, Red becomes increasingly agitated and Thunderbolt drives out of the drive-in, encountering police at the exit. During the ensuing chase, Goody is shot as the police open fire on the vehicle. Red heartlessly tosses the badly wounded Goody out into the road, where he takes a few breaths and then dies.

Red then forces Thunderbolt and Lightfoot to stop the car. He pistol whips them both, knocking them unconscious, and kicks Lightfoot in the head and body several times, severely injuring him. Red takes off with the loot in the getaway car, but is again pursued by police, several of whom he shoots and either kills or injures. He crashes the car under fire into the store where he'd been working during the heist prep, and the store's watchdog rears up and kills him by tearing his throat out.

A conscious and physically-OK Thunderbolt and a clearly injured Lightfoot make their way toward the highway, where they hitch a ride the next morning and are dropped off near Warsaw, Montana. They stumble upon the vanished original schoolhouse, which is now a historical monument on the side of a highway, having been moved there from its original location after the first heist. As the two men retrieve the stolen money, Lightfoot has hearing and balance lapses that concern Thunderbolt.

Thunderbolt buys a new Cadillac convertible with cash, something Lightfoot said he had always wanted to do, and picks up his waiting partner, who is gradually losing control of the left side of his body. As they drive away celebrating their success with cigars, Lightfoot, in obvious distress, tells Thunderbolt in a slurred voice how proud he is of their accomplishments, then slumps over and dies. Thunderbolt snaps his cigar in half, as it is no longer a celebration, and with his dead partner beside him, drives off down the Interstate and into an uncertain future.

== Cast ==
- Clint Eastwood as Thunderbolt
- Jeff Bridges as Lightfoot
- George Kennedy as Red Leary
- Geoffrey Lewis as Goody
- Catherine Bach as Melody
- Gary Busey as Curly (billed as Garey Busey)
- Jack Dodson as Vault Manager
- Gene Elman as Tourist
- Burton Gilliam as Welder
- Roy Jenson as Dunlop
- Claudia Lennear as Secretary
- Bill McKinney as Crazy Driver
- Vic Tayback as Mario
- Dub Taylor as Station Attendant
- Gregory Walcott as Used car salesman
- Erica Hagen as Waitress
- Alvin Childress as Janitor
- Virginia Baker as Couple at station
- Stuart Nisbet as Couple at station
- Irene K. Cooper as Cashier
- Cliff Emmich as The Fat Man
- June Fairchild as Gloria
- Ted Foulkes as Young Boy
- Leslie Oliver as Teenager
- Mark Montgomery as Teenager
- Karen Lamm as Girl on motorcycle
- Luanne Roberts as Suburban housewife
- Lila Teigh as Tourist
- Beth Howland as Vault Ml manager's wife (uncredited)

== Production ==
=== Development and screenplay ===
Michael Cimino wrote the script on spec, with Clint Eastwood in mind. He loosely patterned it off of—and named the characters after—two infamous early-nineteenth-century Irish bandits. Cimino's agent, Stan Kamen of the William Morris Agency, came up with the idea of packaging the film with him, Jeff Bridges and Eastwood. Cimino had also co-written (with John Milius) the screenplay for the second Dirty Harry movie, Magnum Force, starring Eastwood. The latter was now available after ultimately turning down the lead role in Charley Varrick, just as production was nearly ready to begin. Due to the great financial success of Dennis Hopper's Easy Rider, road pictures were a popular genre in Hollywood at that time. Eastwood himself, had been looking for a road movie. Agent Leonard Hirshan brought the script to Eastwood from fellow agent Kamen. After reading the script, Eastwood liked it so much that he intended to direct it himself. However, after meeting Cimino, Eastwood decided to give him the directing job instead, which was Cimino's big break and feature-film directorial debut. Cimino later said that if it was not for Eastwood, he never would have had a career in film. The music was composed by Dee Barton but the end titles song "Where Do I Go From Here?" was composed and performed by Paul Williams.

In the diner scene, Eastwood's character John "Thunderbolt" Doherty recites the opening lines of Thomas McGrath's "Poor John Luck...". McGrath collaborated with Cimino on several early projects.

=== Shooting ===
Although Eastwood generally refused to spend much time in scouting for locations, particularly unfamiliar ones, Cimino and Eastwood's producer Robert Daley traveled extensively around the "Big Sky Country" in Montana for thousands of miles and eventually decided on the Great Falls area and to shoot the film in the towns of Ulm, Hobson, Fort Benton, Augusta and Choteau and surrounding mountainous countryside. The film was shot in 47 days from July to September 1973. It was filmed in Fort Benton, Wolf Creek, Great Falls, and Hobson. St. John's Lutheran Church in Hobson was used for the opening scene. The imaginary freeway exit signage (Warsaw Exit 250) for the fictional town of Warsaw, was in reality, the Interstate 15 exit for Dearborn, an unincorporated community that straddles the Cascade–Lewis and Clark County line. The scene where Thunderbolt recovers the money from the one-room schoolhouse was filmed at the rest stop just south of Exit 240, which is the exit for Dearborn.

Eastwood did not like to do any more than three takes on any given shot, according to co-star Bridges. "I would always go to Mike and say 'I think I can do one more. I got an idea.' And Mike would say 'I gotta ask Clint.' Clint would say, 'Give the kid a shot.'" Charles Okun, first assistant director on Thunderbolt, added, "Clint was the only guy that ever said 'no'. Michael said 'OK, let's go for another take.' It was take four, Clint would say 'No we got enough. We got it.' [...] And if [Cimino] took too long to get it ready, [Clint] would say, 'It's good, let's go.'" Cimino would later cite his ability to set up and film quickly on this production when the filming of his 1980 movie Heaven's Gate was in such trouble that United Artists executives gave him two choices: deliver a three-hour cut within a new budget parameter or be fired from the production altogether.

== Release ==
Thunderbolt was released on May 22, 1974. The film grossed $9 million in rentals on its initial theatrical release and eventually grossed $25 million in the United States, making it the 17th highest-grossing film of 1974. The film did respectable box office business, and the studio profited, but Clint Eastwood vowed never to work with the movie's distributor United Artists again due to what he felt was bad promotion. According to author Marc Eliot, Eastwood perceived himself as being upstaged by Bridges.

Thunderbolt and Lightfoot was released to DVD by MGM Home Video on June 13, 2000, as a Region 1 widescreen DVD and also by Twilight Time on February 11, 2014, as a Region A Blu-ray.

== Reception ==
Howard Thompson of The New York Times praised the film as "a funny, tough-fibered crime comedy with an unobtrusive edge of drama. With Clint Eastwood as an older, wise thief and Jeff Bridges as his grinning apprentice, the picture is consistently entertaining and interesting." Arthur D. Murphy of Variety called it "an overlong, sometimes hilariously vulgar comedy-drama, about the restaging of a difficult safecracking heist. Debuting director Michael Cimino, who also wrote the rambling, anticlimactic script, obtained superior performances from Eastwood, George Kennedy, Geoffrey Lewis and especially Jeff Bridges, outstanding as a young drifter who joins the gang."

Gene Siskel of the Chicago Tribune gave the film two-and-a-half stars out of four and wrote that "one is left wondering what attracted these actors to a story that leaves every flash of humanity for a protracted robbery, shootout, or some manner of cruelty. Eastwood and Bridges try to build an older-younger brother relationship during the film; it is lost, however, amid all the killings and explosions." Kevin Thomas of the Los Angeles Times called it "a rambunctious and surprisingly touching movie", adding that "writer Michael Cimino, in a potent directorial debut, displays a clear, concise style and very impressive control."

Gary Arnold of The Washington Post wrote that the film "takes about an hour to get down to business, and it's such a weirdly kinked-up, trumped-up exercise in formula moviemaking, with indiscriminate borrowings from this film and that film and almost schizoid variations in tone and style, that one begins to wonder if Eastwood's truest fans will find it slightly indigestible too." John Raisbeck of Monthly Film Bulletin stated: "John Milius' collaborator on the screenplay for Magnum Force, Michael Cimino makes his directorial debut with Thunderbolt and Lightfoot, a film as interestingly idiosyncratic if not as controlled as Milius' Dillinger. The script, also by Cimino, is packed with excellent moments, but somehow the whole never amounts to more than the sum of its parts."

Jay Cocks of Time called the film "one of the most ebullient and eccentric diversions around." Leonard Maltin gave the film three out of four stars, describing it as "Colorful, tough melodrama-comedy with good characterizations; Lewis is particularly fine, but Bridges steals the picture."

On Rotten Tomatoes, the film has an approval rating of 89% based on reviews from 35 critics. The website's consensus is: "This likable buddy/road picture deftly mixes action and comedy, and features excellent work from stars Clint Eastwood and Jeff Bridges and first-time director Michael Cimino." Metacritic, which uses a weighted average, assigned the film a score of 62 out of 100, based on 10 critics, indicating "generally favorable" reviews. Thunderbolt has since become a cult film.

As a result of this film and Cimino's TV commercial work, producer Michael Deeley would approach Cimino to direct and co-write the Oscar-winning The Deer Hunter (1978).

Jeff Bridges was nominated for the Academy Award for Best Supporting Actor at the 47th Academy Awards. Eastwood's acting performance was noted by critics to the extent that he himself believed it was Oscar-worthy.

== Analysis ==
Richard Brody of The New Yorker noted that the "benighted lumpishness" of Red and Goody "contrasts dismally with Thunderbolt's bladelike precision and Lightfoot's carefree, sexually uninhibited insolence."

Author Michael Bliss wrote that while Thunderbolt may appear to be a conventional violent action film with Eastwood in the lead role, the film is more like "a meditation on, than a representation of, the male camaraderie theme" using rhetorical devices such as symbols, camerawork, and allusive dialogue to add to that theme. According to Bliss, the film's structural paradigm describes a tripartite series of events: natural order followed by disturbance followed by a restoration of the natural order.

== See also ==
- List of American films of 1974

== Bibliography ==
- Bach, Steven (September 1, 1999). Final Cut: Art, Money, and Ego in the Making of Heaven's Gate, the Film That Sank United Artists (Updated ed.). New York: Newmarket Press. ISBN 1-55704-374-4.
- Bliss, Michael (1985). "Two For The Road". Martin Scorsese and Michael Cimino (Hardcover ed.). Metuchen, New Jersey: Scarecrow Press. pp. 151–165. ISBN 0-8108-1783-7.
- Carducci, Mark Patrick (writer), Gallagher, John Andrew (editor) (1989). "Michael Cimino". Film Directors on Directing (Paperback ed.). Westport, Connecticut: Praeger Publishers. ISBN 0-275-93272-9.
- Deeley, Michael (April 7, 2009). Blade Runners, Deer Hunters, & Blowing the Bloody Doors Off: My Life in Cult Movies. New York: Pegasus Books LLC. ISBN 978-1-60598-038-6.
- Eliot, Marc (October 6, 2009). American Rebel: The Life of Clint Eastwood (1st ed.). New York: Rebel Road, Inc. ISBN 978-0-307-33688-0.
- Hughes, Howard (2009). Aim for the Heart. London: I.B. Tauris. ISBN 978-1-84511-902-7.
- McGilligan, Patrick (1999). Clint: The Life and Legend. London: Harper Collins. ISBN 0-00-638354-8.
- Wood, Robin (2003). "From Buddies to Lovers". Hollywood from Vietnam to Reagan (Revised and Expanded ed.). New York: Columbia University Press. ISBN 978-0-231-12966-4.
