= David Serero (singer) =

Moroccan-French opera singer (born 1981)

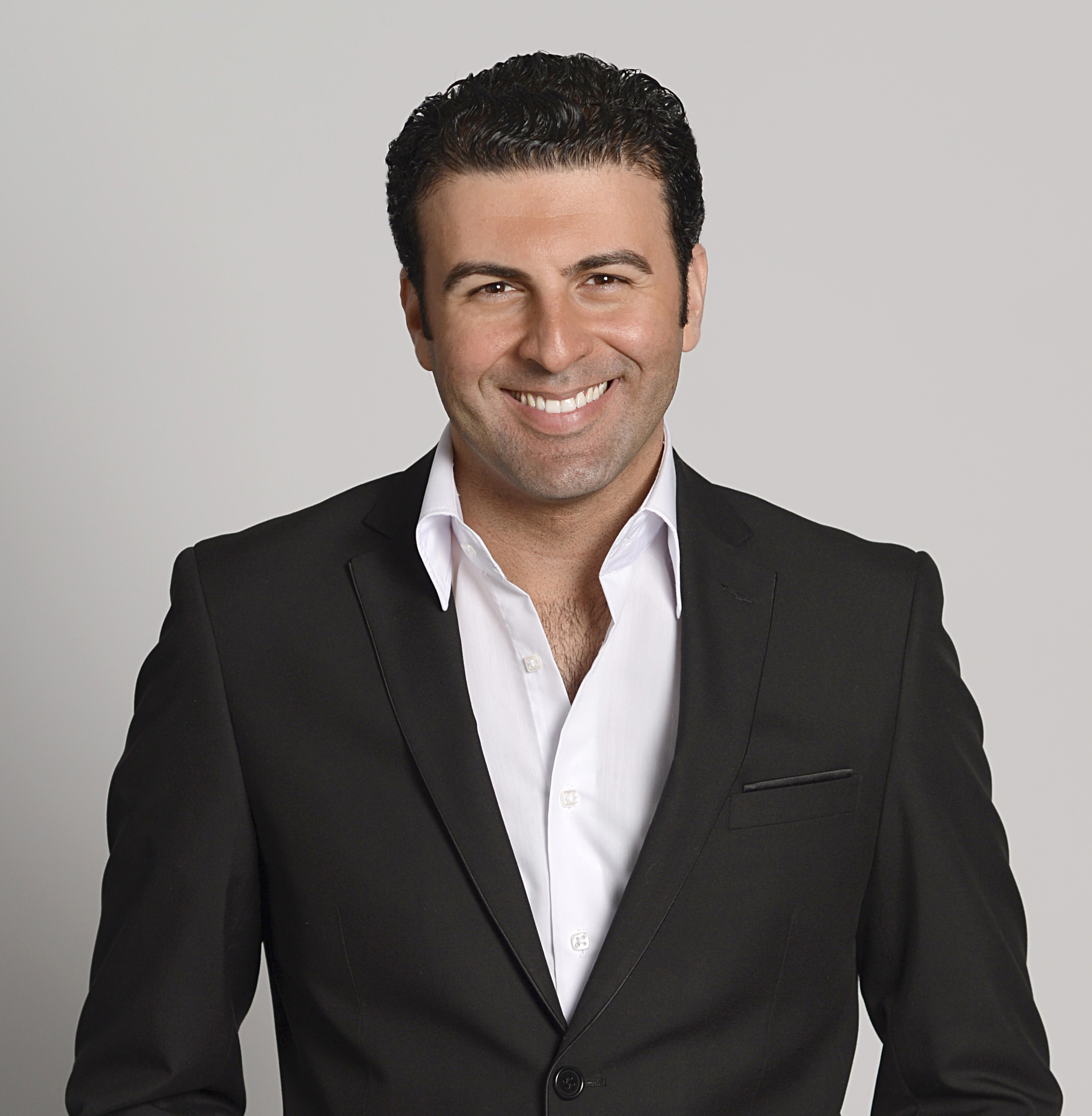
- David Serero in 2014

Background information
- Born: 22 April 1981 (age 45); Paris, France
- Genres: Opera, Broadway musicals, jazz
- Occupations: Singer, director, producer
- Website: davidserero.com

David Serero (born 22 April 1981) is a Moroccan-French baritone opera singer, stage & film director, and producer. He has sung in many concerts and performed in opera, theater and musicals such as the title role in Cyrano de Bergerac, Othello, Richard III, Don Giovanni, Rigoletto and Nabucco, Shylock in The Merchant of Venice, Don Quixote in Man of La Mancha, Escamillo in Carmen, Enrico in Lucia di Lammermoor and Amonasro in Aida, and in films and TV series. He has toured in America, Europe, the Middle East, Asia and Russia.

He received the 2019 Albert Nelson Marquis Lifetime Achievement Award. In 2020, he received the UNESCO Award for Diversity. He won the 2020 BroadwayWorld Awards for Best Performer of the decade, Best Producer of a Musical of the decade, Best Producer of a Play of the decade. The Mayor of New York, Bill de Blasio, awarded him with the Certificate of Recognition for his contributions to the City of New York.

== Early life and education ==
Born in Paris to a Moroccan Jewish family from Fez, Serero studied jazz piano at the American School of Modern Music and at the Bill Evans Piano Academy in Paris. He lived in New York from 2001 to 2003, where he studied singing and acting at the HB Studio, where he played roles in classic plays. Serero moved to St. Petersburg, Russia, to study at the Rimsky-Korsakov Music Conservatory, where he made his debut as Scarpia in Tosca and Germont in La traviata. Following these performances, he joined the Young Singers Academy of the Mariinsky Theater.

== Early career ==
In 2006, Serero made his European debut in the role of Escamillo in Carmen at the Brasov Opera and returned the following year to perform the four villains in The Tales of Hoffmann. The next year he performed as Alfio in Cavalleria rusticana and Canio in Pagliacci in Harrisburg, Pennsylvania. In 2008, he played Dr Malatesta in Don Pasquale with the Centre Philharmonic Orchestra in Bordeaux, and returned to the Brasov Opera, where he received the Encouragement Prize from the Bizet Foundation for his performance of Zurga in The Pearl Fishers. In 2009, he performed Enrico in Lucia di Lammermoor and Escamillo in Florida, and in July, was selected to be part of the opera competition Operalia, founded by Plácido Domingo, at the Budapest Opera and Pecs Opera.

In 2010, he performed more than 50 performances of the lead roles in the operettas La Périchole and La Grande-Duchesse de Gerolstein, in Paris, and also performed Zapata in the operetta Le Chanteur de Mexico in Nice, France. In June 2010, he performed a concert in front of the Eiffel Tower for more than 18 000 people. From September 2010 to June 2011, Serero performed at the Opera du Ranelagh in Paris, which included a concert with pianist Cyprien Katsaris. In April 2011, he sang at the Olympia in Paris. In June 2010, he performed three concerts in Vladikavkaz (Russia). In June 2011, he performed at the Tchaikovsky Hall in Moscow. That same month, he played the part of the bodyguard in the movie Chinese Zodiac CZ12, directed by Jackie Chan. In July 2011, he performed the lead role of the first opera in Hebrew, The Dybbuk, at the Kfar Blum Festival, Israel.

In 2012, he performed Valiente in the operetta Andalousia in Lyon, France, then played Don Quixote in the musical Man of La Mancha in Paris, Tokyo and Deauville. He next sang with the Concertgebouw in Amsterdam. In June 2012, he founded the first Paris Musical Film Festival with the City Hall of Paris. In both July 2012 and 2013, he performed for the President of Israel, Shimon Peres, and performed a concert at the Felicja Blumental in Tel-Aviv. In October, he made his West End debut at the Dominion Theatre in London. He next performed in Paris as Happy Mac in Duke Ellington's musical Beggar's Holiday and appears in the cast album.

In 2013, Serero wrote, directed and produced the musical You Are Not Alone, in which he starred with Jermaine Jackson. He also arranged and produced I Wish You Love, Jackson's album of jazz standards, in which they duet on "Autumn Leaves". In April 2013 and 2014, he performed at the Royal College of Music in London for the Festival of Russian songs and was also a jury member of the competition. In May 2013, he released his solo debut album All I Care About is Love. He also founded the 1st London Musical Film Festival at the Bush Hall. Later in 2013, he performed a concert series in Capri, Italy, at Wembley Stadium in London and in St. Petersburg. He then gave a solo concert, All I Care About Is Love, at The Theater Center (Bernstein Theater) in New York.

== 2014–2015 ==
In 2014, he released the album The Broadway Baritone, Volume 1, with the Prague Philharmonic Orchestra and toured from London's Leicester Square Theatre to Birmingham, Liverpool and the Royal Northern College of Music in Manchester. He also recorded the anthem for the Brazil World Soccer Cup. He gave solo concerts at the Théâtre du Gymnase in Paris for more than 100 performances from May to September 2014 and was featured at the RASIA Festival in Moscow. He also released a documentary called I Wish You Love, the Making Of about the recording of the 2013 album with Jackson. He next recorded all the Napoleon's love letters to Josephine and appeared in the French films Eva & Leon as Italian Crooner and Nous Trois ou Rien as Kheiron. In September, he released his album The Crooner Baritone, The Frank Sinatra Classics. He then returned with this solo show to the Bernstein Theater. He released a single from Scarface, a musical that he wrote based on Al Capone's life and the Al Pacino film. From November 2014 to May 2016 he played Chef Bruno in the musical Truffles in New York. He also performed his musical comedy Xmas for Jews – A Comic Jewish Tragedy at Zanger Hall in New York. He also performed roles in the films The Kingdom of the Alley (as Marco) and Ring Ring (as the burglar) by Stephen Skeel, Super Paradise (as Adam the Rabbi) by Nour Matimush, Capicola (as Ralphie) by Mark Aiello, Laundry Day (as Angelo the mobster) by Jake Peterson, Ransom (as Mr. Butler) by Brendan Duffy, There will come soft rain (Alonse) by Danielle Boyd and Amarena (Benny's father) by Andrew Abballe.

In January 2015, he released the album David Serero chante Luis Mariano Jazz!. He arranged and produced this album, performed in French, dedicated to Luis Mariano. He appeared in New York 180 (as Alfredo the tailor) by Hongkai Sun, Day to Night (as Saleem) in the horror film directed by Ana Pasisanos, Paisanos in Paris (as Francois) by Ernie Zahn, Near it all by Woody Lewis, Crime Scene: Do Not Cross (as Detective Jack) by Katie Huang, Speedy (as Ali) by Ameer Kazmi, Make it work / How we do it (as the executive) by Nicholas Bruckman, Gangs of New York – Blood Feuds for Discovery Channel by Andrea de Brito, Alice in America (as the Lottery investigator), Tango Shalom (as the cantor) by Gabriel Bologna, Again (as James) by Omar Salgado, Overload (as Sal) by Mark Aiello, The Redemption (as the violent father) by Steve Carmona, Sorry Charlie (as Adileh's father) by Lawrence Sharp, Hooligans (as the deli owner) by Patrick Lizza, Suddenly Rich (as the real estate agent) for TLC TV, and Whistleblowers (CIA Agent) for Spike TV. In March 2015, he played the parts of Christopher Sly & Vincentio in The Taming of the Shrew by Shakespeare at the New York Public Library. In April 2015, he starred as the lead in the commercial between Sotheby's and eBay partnership in New York. In May 2015, he played the parts of King Edward and Ratcliff in Richard III by Shakespeare in New York with the Oxford Shakespeare Company directed by Ron Destro, and in that same month he played the 'role of Marcel Proust in the play "Proust & Joyce at the Hotel Majestic" at the French Consulate of New York. In June 2015, he played Shylock in The Merchant of Venice by Shakespeare at the Center for Jewish History in New York and was featured on Yahoo! Small Business regarding producing theater. He was a guest artist at the New York Jewish Music Festival and performed the annual Gala at the National Arts Club of New York. He played the roles of Lewis the Dauphin and Robert Faulconbridge in King John by Shakespeare at the New York Public Library. He released the album Richard III, by Shakespeare, in French, which he adapted. In September, he performed for the New York Fashion Week and produced the debut album of Russian singer Zarina Maliti on his record label. He announced his TV Series called "Napoleon in New York", which he wrote and starred in as Napoleon. On September 26 and 27, he performed two open air concerts in Times Square for Best of France in the presence of French President François Hollande. He was the emcee of this event with the Moulin Rouge. In October, he released his new album Sephardi featuring Sephardi songs in Ladino, which he arranged and produced and an a capella version of the Habanera from Carmen in a duet with beatboxer Mythe Boxe. In November, he released All My Love Is for You, a pop album that he composed, performed, arranged and produced. In December, he performed a concert at Queens College in New York for the City University of New York.

== 2016–2019 ==
In January 2016, he played Shylock in The Merchant of Venice at the Center for Jewish History in New York. Jewish Week compared his Shylock to those of Laurence Olivier, Al Pacino, Dustin Hoffman, Jacob Adler and Zero Mostel. In the same venue, he starred in the title roles of Verdi's Opera Nabucco in April and Shakespeare's Othello in June off-Broadway. He produced and released the debut album Hunger Pains of Hip Hop artist Rob Cherry on his record label. He produced the 19th edition of the New York Sephardic Jewish Film Festival for the American Sephardi Federation at the Center for Jewish History. The same month he discussed the future of the music business with Pharrell Williams on AOL He started his radio show The Culture News – On the phone with David Serero with iTunes Radio. In May, he sang the title roles in Don Giovanni and Rigoletto at Carnegie Hall in New York. The same month he performed at the Jerusalem Post Conference in New York. In June he performed at the Blue Note Jazz Festival in New York. In September, he sang for the President of Portugal, Marcelo Rebelo de Sousa.

In 2017 he performed a gala concert to benefit Surgeons of Hope at the National Opera Center of America. He produced the 20th Anniversary Edition of the New York Sephardic Jewish Film Festival. He is one of the judges of the Featured International Singing Competition in New York. He performed a concert at the Fashion Institute of Technology of New York. At the Pomegranate Lifetime Achievement Award Ceremony in honor of Andre Azoulay, he performed Moroccan songs and the national anthem of Morocco. In April, he performed in Chicago at the Alliance Française de Chicago, in Toronto and for the Soroka Medical Center Gala at the Pierre Hotel in New York. He performed the opening of the Israel Parade of New York. He was a guest in French TV show Vendredi Tout Est Permis on TF1 singing "New York, New York" as well as a Moroccan song. He produced and was artistic director of the American Sephardi Music Festival. He performed an open air concert in New York for Bastille Day organized by the Fiaf. After performing in Paris at the Comédie Bastille, he performed an open air concert on the Freedom Plaza for the Festival of Morocco in Washington DC, Toronto and Montreal, Canada, for the Canadian Friends of Soroka Medical Center. In December, he played Barabas in The Jew of Malta by Christopher Marlowe in New York. His radio show The Culture News – On the Phone with David Serero was aired on iHeart Radio.

In January 2018, Serero played the title role of Reb Dovid Moysheles in Yiddish King Lear by Jacob Gordin at the Angel Orensanz Foundation in New York in partnership with the Yivo Foundation. He adapted in English and directed this revival and appears on the first cast album of that play, which featured Yiddish songs of play's the era. He performed at the Russian Culture House of London, Rossotrudnichestvo, for the Stars of the Albion Festival He then appeared as King Ahasuerus in the musical Queen Esther's Dilemma, which he directed and produced at the Center for Jewish History. He performed and hosted the 70th Anniversary of World Health Day by the World Health Organization at the United Nations, New York. He played Cyrano in Cyrano de Bergerac in New York in his own English adaptation and recorded the cast album. In June, he played the title role in Don Giovanni in his own adaptation off-Broadway. He sang for the Edmond Rostand 2018 Festival with the French Military Orchestra in Paris. He played Napoleon in his own stage adaptation of a concept by Stanley Kubrick.

In 2019, he performed off-broadway in the title roles of Nabucco, Romeo (in his own Jewish adaptation of Romeo and Juliet), Figaro (Marriage of Figaro). He played Otto Frank, in Anne Frank a musical, which he directed and produced off-Broadway. He wrote and directed, with Lisa Azuelos, the musical Lost in the Disco, which he produced off-Broadway. He receives the 2019 Albert Nelson Marquis Lifetime Achievement Award

== 2020–2024 ==
In 2020 he received the Award for Diversity from UNESCO. He released his books Operation Odessa and From I Can't Breathe to Black Lives Matter: How George Floyd's Tragic Death changed America. He released the audio recordings of The Diary of a Madman by Gogol, The Megillah of Esther, The Greatest War Speeches of Napoleon Bonaparte and J'Accuse...! by Émile Zola. He recorded the part of Ludwig van Beethoven in his own one-man-play I, Beethoven for Beethoven 250th's Anniversary. He headlined at the Montreal Sephardic Festival, performed at the Louvre Museum during Paris Fashion Week, and returned as the producer of NY Sephardic Jewish Film Festival.

In 2021 he released singles from his musical "Scarface, The Al Capone Musical", for which he arranged Jazz standards with hip-hop arrangements featuring jazz, opera and burlesque elements. He won the BroadwayWorld Awards 2020 for Best Performer of the decade, Best Producer of a Musical of the decade (Anne Frank, a Musical), Best Producer of a Play of the decade (Romeo and Juliet). The Mayor of New York, Bill de Blasio, gave him the Certificate of Recognition from the City of New York for his contribution to New York's cultural landscape, for enriching the performing arts sector, uplifted and inspired diverse New Yorkers. He directed and produced a documentary about fashion designer Elie Tahari. The film won Best Fashion Documentary at the London Fashion Film Festival, Moscow International Design Film Festival (Jury Award), China Beijing Film Festival (Best Documentary Producer Award), among others. It was selected at The Chelsea Film Festival (New York), and others. In Paris, he created the Festival Napoleon.

He gave a concert at the Dubai World Expo for Morocco and in Yerevan, Armenia, in 2022. Off-Broadway, he played Moses in "The Ten Commandments, The Musical" (Les Dix Commandements), which he adapted in English, directed, and produced, His documentary on Elie Tahari was screened at Lincoln Center. He is named in the "40 under 40" honoree list for the United States Business Elite Awards.

In 2024, he performed the role of Prosecutor Gideon Hausner in his own play, The Trial of Eichmann (based on the Eichmann Trial), which was staged in New York and directed by him.

== Film and television career ==
=== Television ===
In television, Serero started his career in France with: Juste un pitch (2008), Code Barge (2008), Krach (2009), C'est la crise (2011), Mes amis, mes amours, mes emmerdes (2011), Interpol (2011), Des soucis et des hommes (2011), Las Vegas Hotel (2011), L'Attaque (2011), Platane (2011), Silences d'Etat (2012), RIS Police (2012), Profilage (2012), Royal Palace (2012). In America, he starred in Blood Feuds – Gangs of New York by Discovery Channel on American Heroes Channel (2015), On the Case with Paula Zahn, Suddenly Rich on TLC (2016), Whistleblowers on Spike TV (2016), Six Degrees of Murder on Discovery Channel (2016), Deadline: Crime with Tamron Hall on NBC (2016), The Hunt with John Walsh on CNN (2016), We Are New York WANY (2017), Pandora's Box on Discovery ID (2018) and Quantico on ABC.

=== Cinema ===
In films, Serero starred: Le Marchant de Miracles with Borys Szyc (2009), Le Mac (2011), The Day I Saw Your Heart with Mélanie Laurent (2011), The Chef with Jean Reno (2011), Chinese Zodiac 12 with and directed by Jackie Chan (2012), Nous trois ou rien (2015), Eva & Leon (2015).

In New York he starred in There will come soft rains by Danielle Boyd (2014), Capicola by Mark Aiello (2014), Laundry Day by Jake Peterson (2014), The Kingdom of the Alley and Ring Ring by Stephen Skeel (2014), Ransom by Brendan Duffy (2014), Amarena (in Italian) by Andrew Abballe (2014), Super Paradise by Nour Matimusha (2014), New York 180 by Hongkai Sun (2015), Paisanos in Paris by Ernie Zahn (2015), Near it all / How we do it by Nicholas Bruckman (2015), Crime Scene: Do Not Cross by Katie Huang (2015), Speedy by Ameer Kazmi (2015), Near it all by Woody Lewis (2015), Most Beautiful Island by Ana Paisanos (2015), The Redemption by Steve Carmona (2015), Sorry Charlie! by Lawrence Edmond (2015), Hooligans by Patrick Lizza (2015), Sheepshead by Ari Ben Avram (2016), Jihadi Street (2016), Tango Shalom, starring Lainie Kazan (2016), Overload Rock or Die (2016), Alice in America (2016), Following Phil (2016) and When I Sing (2017).

== Philanthropy ==
Serero has performed at concerts to benefit charities including UNICEF, the Hadassah Hospital, Meir Panim, Surgeons of Hope and Broadway Cares. He has brought opera programs to schools, hospitals such as the Children hospital of Paris and the Mount Sinai Hospital of New York and prisons. He has been the president of Young Hadassah in France since 2011. Serero created The Forbidden Talents (Les Talents Interdits) to perform music banned during the Nazi regime. He published his collection Movie Stills of American and French Actors. He performed at the B. B. King Club in New York for the National Down Syndrome Society in March 2016. In 2019, he donated part of his Judaica art collection to the Jewish Museum of Morocco, the largest donation of Judaica ever received in Morocco.

== Discography ==
- Cyrano de Bergerac – Live from New York (2018)
- Napoleon by Stanley Kubrick – Cast Album (2018)
- The Yiddish King Lear – Live from New York (2018)
- Queen Esther's dilemma – Live from New York (2018)
- The Yiddish King Lear – Cast Album (2018)
- The Jew of Malta – Cast Album (2018)
- Baritone Opera Arias (2018)
- The Jew of Malta – Live from New York (2018)
- All My Love is For You (2016)
- Othello – Live from New York (2016)
- Sephardi (2015)
- Richard III (performed in French) (2015)
- The Merchant of Venice (2015)
- David Serero chante Luis Mariano JAZZ! (2015)
- The Crooner Baritone, The Frank Sinatra Classics (2014)
- Napoleon's love letters to Josephine (performed in French) (2014)
- The Broadway Baritone, Volume 1 (2014)
- You are not alone, Live with Jermaine Jackson (2014)
- Scarface, The Musical (2014)
- All I Care About is Love (2013)
- David Serero as Don Quixote from Man of La Mancha (2013)
- Beggar's Holiday, the Duke Ellington Broadway Musical (2012)
- I Wish You Love with Jermaine Jackson (2012)
- David Serero & Cyprien Katsaris, Live from Paris (2011)
- David Serero Live Jewish Music from Paris (2011)

== Filmography ==
- When I Sing (2018)
- Most Beautiful Island (2017)
- Hatikvah (2017)
- Sheepshead (2017)
- Jihadi Street (2017)
- Tango Shalom (2017)
- Overload Rock or Die (2016)
- Alice in America (2016)
- Following Phil (2016)
- All Three of Us (2015)
- Again (2015)
- The Redemption (2015)
- The three of us or nothing (2015)
- Paisanos in Paris (2015)
- New York Vertigo (2015)
- Winter Has No Sun (2015)
- Sorry Charlie (2015)
- Hooligans (2015)
- Crime Scene: Do Not Cross! (2015)
- Near it All (2015)
- Speedy (2015)
- The Kingdom of the Alley (2014)
- Eva & Leon (2015)
- Amarena (2014)
- There will come soft rains (2014)
- Ring, Ring (2014)
- Capicola (2014)
- Super Paradise (2014)
- Laundry Day (2014)
- Ransom (2014)
- Amarena (2014)
- There will come soft rains (2014)
- Chinese Zodiac CZ12 (2012). Directed by Jackie Chan
- The Day I Saw Your Heart (2011)
- Le Chef (2011)
- La Vérité si je mens ! 3 (2011)
- Le Mac (2009)
- The Miracle Seller (2008)
- The Boxer (2003)
- The Italian Lover (2002)

== Television ==
- Quantico (2018)
- We Speak NYC (2018)
- Crimes of Fashion on Discovery ID (2018)
- Pandora's Box on Discovery ID (2018)
- Mysteries at the Museum on Travel Channel (2016–2018)
- The Hunt with John Walsh on CNN (2017)
- Deadline Crime with Tamron Hall on NBC (2016)
- On the case with Paula Zahn (2016)
- Six Degrees of Murder on Discovery Channel (2016)
- Don Julio (2016)
- Whistleblowers on Spike TV (2016)
- Checked Out (2016)
- Suddenly Rich on TLC (2016)
- Rabid Beast on Animal Planet (2016)
- Blood Feuds Gangs of New York by Discovery Channel on American Heroes Channel (2015)
- Royal Palace (2013)
- Profilage (2012)
- R.I.S Police (2012)
- Silences d'Etat (2011)
- C'est la crise (2011)
- Mes amis, mes amours, mes emmerdes (2011)
- Une famille formidable (2011)
- Ni vu, ni connu (2011)
- Interpol (2011)
- Des soucis et des hommes (2011)
- Las Vegas Hotel (2011)
- L'attaque (2011)
- Platane (2011)
- Les beaux mecs (2010)
- Krach (2009)
- Code barge (2008)
- Juste un pitch (2008)
