= Real Women Have Curves (musical) =

Musical based on the play of the same name

- The Musical
- Broadway Promotional Poster
- Music: Joy Huerta & Benjamin Velez
- Lyrics: Joy Huerta & Benjamin Velez
- Book: Lisa Loomer with Nell Benjamin
- Basis: Real Women Have Curves; By: Josefina López
- Premiere: December 6, 2023: American Repertory Theater
- Productions: 2023 Cambridge; 2025 Broadway

Real Women Have Curves is a stage musical with a book by Lisa Loomer with Nell Benjamin and music and lyrics by Joy Huerta and Benjamin Velez. The show is based on the play of the same name by Josefina López, and the 2002 film based on the play, written by Lopez and George LaVoo. The show opened on Broadway on April 27, 2025 at the James Earl Jones Theatre.

The show is set in 1987 Boyle Heights, Los Angeles and follows a young woman named Ana García, who goes to work in a garment factory alongside her mother, Carmen. The show follows a group of women and their struggles with societal expectations, difficult family dynamics, immigration issues, and finding the courage to follow their dreams. The musical also touches on body positivity. Although Real Women Have Curves is primarily in English, there are also Spanish phrases incorporated in the script.The show has been critically well received and was nominated for two Tony Awards, Best Featured Actress in a Musical, and Best Original Score.

== Synopsis ==
In Boyle Heights, Los Angeles, in 1987, recent high school graduate Ana García is accepted to Columbia University. Ana struggles to balance her dream of going to college with family duty and a tough economic situation. Ana conceals the news from her father Raúl and her mother Carmen. Initially, Carmen resists the idea in favor of Ana helping her sister Estela, who oversees a textile factory and needs to manufacture 200 dresses in three weeks. Further complicating matters, most of the factory's workers are undocumented; Ana is the only U.S. citizen working there. The factory experiences several challenges including an immigration raid next door and the deportation of Itzel, one of their employees.

Ana wants to both keep her family together and resolve their precarious finances. Ana accepts an internship at a newspaper, where she meets another intern named Henry. The two interns form a romance, with Henry disregarding Ana's self-deprecation. Ana juggles the newspaper internship with her factory job; in the end, she ultimately decides to go to Columbia University.

== Production history ==
=== Cambridge (2023) ===
The musical premiered at the American Repertory Theater in Cambridge, Massachusetts on December 6, 2023, and closed on January 21, 2024. The show is directed and choreographed by Sergio Trujillo. Orchestrations were done by Bill Sherman and Cian McCarthy. Nadia DiGiallonardo served as musical director and vocal arranger. Scene design was done by Arnulfo Maldonado with costumes by Paloma Young and Wilberth Gonzalez.

=== Broadway (2025) ===
On September 12, 2024, it was announced the show plans to transfer to Broadway's James Earl Jones Theatre in 2025. It was also announced Nell Benjamin was added to the creative team. Producers of the show include the theatrical husband and wife team Barry and Fran Weissler. The show started previews on April 1 and opened on April 27.

An original Broadway cast recording was released on June 6, 2025. The show was nominated for two awards at the 78th Tony Awards in 2025 but did not win either. The musical played a total of 104 performances (31 previews and 73 regular performances) by the time it closed on June 29.

== Original cast and characters ==
Character	Cambridge	Broadway
Character	2023	2025
Ana García	Lucy Godinez	Tatianna Córdoba
Carmen Garcia	Justina Machado	Justina Machado
Raul Garcia	Edward Padilla	Mauricio Mendoza
Estella Garcia	Florencia Cuenca	Florencia Cuenca
Pancha	Carla Jimenez	Carla Jimenez
Rosali	Jennifer Sanchez	Jennifer Sanchez
Izel/Itzel	Satya Chavez	Aline Mayagoitia
Henry	Mason Reeves	Mason Reeves
Mrs. Wright	Yvette González-Nacer	Monica Tulia Ramirez
Prima Fulvia	Sandra Valls	Sandra Valls
Prima Flaca	Shelby Acosta	Shelby Acosta

Of the 19 cast members in the Broadway production, 16 are Hispanic or Latino, and most made their Broadway debut in the show.

== Musical numbers ==
Act I

- "Make It Work" - Estela, Factory Ladies
- "De Nada" - Carmen, Raúl, Estela
- "Flying Away" - Ana
- "Jugglin'" - Company
- "If I Were A Bird" - Itzel, Ana
- "De Nada (Reprise)" - Carmen
- "Daydream" - Estela, Company
- "Already Know You" - Henry, Ana, Company
- "Oye Muchacha" - Carmen, Ana, Estela, Company

Act II

- "Flying Away / If I Were a Bird (Reprise)" - Ana, Itzel
- "Adios Andres" - Carmen, Factory Ladies
- "Siempre Mi Gente" - Rosalí, Pancha, Company
- "Make It Work (Reprise)" - Mrs. Wright, Assistants
- "Real Women Have Curves" - Ana, Factory Ladies
- "Doin' It Anyway" - Henry, Ana
- "Life Is Like A Dance" - Raúl, Carmen
- "Flying Away (Reprise)" - Estela, Ana
- "Finishing The Dresses" - Ana, Estela, Factory Ladies
- "Daydream (Reprise)" - Itzel
- "I Got It Wrong" - Ana, Carmen, Company

== Reception ==
=== Reviews ===
Robert Hofler of TheWrap praised the musical as a substantial improvement over the film and play of the same name, particularly praising the storyline as showing that "women of color have the right to be bad, too".

Vulture critic Sara Holdren felt that the musical's storyline was especially prescient, given the ongoing deportations in the second presidency of Donald Trump, and said that "the brightness and backbone of Real Women Have Curves feel bracing". The real-life political context was also noted by Frank Rizzo of Variety, who called the storyline "chillingly relevant" and felt that the musical was "much more than a celebration of culture, community and body positivity".

Laura Collins-Hughes, writing for The New York Times, regarded Real Women Have Curves as "a bouncy, crowd-pleasing comedy" mixed with some drama and a likeable cast, despite some "banalities" in the second act. Naveen Kumar wrote in The Washington Post that "the creators pull off an impressive balancing act in relishing joy and humor amid striving and strife."

Several of the reviewers praised the musical's titular song, in which several of the women sing while in their undergarments. By contrast, Greg Evans of Deadline Hollywood liked the casting choices but felt that the story was watered-down, "with triteness, cliche and lack of real surprise".

=== Awards and nominations ===
Year	Award	Category	Nominee	Result
2025	Tony Awards	Best Performance by a Featured Actress in a Musical	Justina Machado	Nominated
2025	Tony Awards	Best Original Score	Joy Huerta and Benjamin Velez	Nominated
2025	Drama League Awards	Outstanding Production of a Musical	Real Women Have Curves	Nominated
2025	Drama League Awards	Outstanding Direction of a Musical	Sergio Trujillo	Nominated
2025	Drama League Awards	Distinguished Performance	Tatianna Córdoba	Nominated
2025	Drama League Awards	Distinguished Performance	Justina Machado	Nominated
2025	Outer Critics Circle Awards	Outstanding New Broadway Musical	Real Women Have Curves	Nominated
2025	Outer Critics Circle Awards	Outstanding New Score	Joy Huerta and Benjamin Velez	Nominated
2025	Outer Critics Circle Awards	Outstanding Costume Design	Wilberth Gonzalez and Paloma Young	Nominated
