= Josefina López =

Mexican playwright (born 1969)

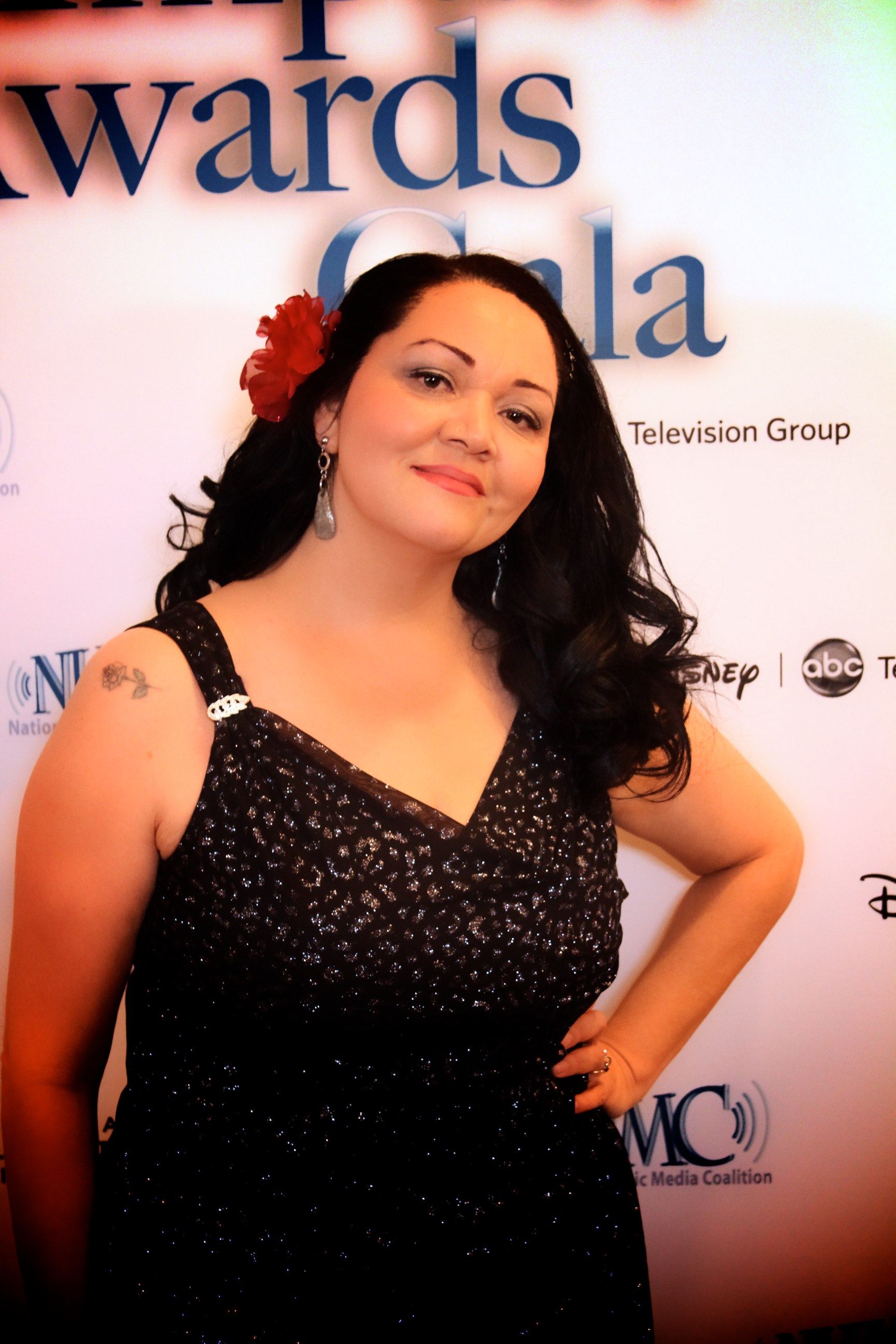
- Lopez at the National Hispanic Media Coalition's 16th Annual Impact Awards Gala
- Born: 1969 (age 56–57); San Luis Potosí, Mexico
- Citizenship: Mexico (birth), United States (1995)
- Education: Columbia College (BA) UCLA (MFA)
- Occupations: Playwright, Artistic Director, Community Leader
- Writing career
- Language: English, Spanish
- Notable work: Real Women Have Curves

Josefina López (born 1969, San Luis Potosí, Mexico) is a Chicana playwright, perhaps best known as the author of the play (and co-author of the screenplay) Real Women Have Curves. López is also the Founding Artistic Director of the CASA 0101 theater located in Boyle Heights, California, which began in 2000.

== Early life ==
López was born in 1969 in San Luis Potosí, Mexico, and at age five, she emigrated with her family to the United States, where they settled in Los Angeles, California. She graduated from the Los Angeles County High School for the Arts before obtaining a BA in film and screenwriting from Columbia College Chicago, and an MFA in screenwriting from the School of Theater, Film and Television at UCLA. She also graduated with a Supreme Diploma from Le Cordon Bleu.

López was undocumented for 13 years before she received amnesty in 1987 and eventually became a U.S. Citizen in 1995. López is the recipient of a number of other awards and accolades, including a formal recognition from U.S. Senator Barbara Boxer's 7th Annual "Women Making History" banquet in 1998 and a screenwriting fellowship from the California Arts Council in 2001. She and Real Women Have Curves co-author George LaVoo won the Humanitas Prize for Screenwriting in 2002, The Gabriel Garcia Marquez Award from Los Angeles Mayor James K. Hahn in 2003, and the Artist-in-Residency grant from the National Endowment for the Arts/Theatre Communications Group for 2007.

== Career ==
After having over 100 productions of her plays run throughout the United States, Josefina López is one of today's preeminent Chicana writers. She has written several plays such as Simply Maria, Or the American Dream; Confessions of Women From East L.A.; Boyle Heights; Lola Goes To Roma; Food For The Dead; Unconquered Spirits; Queen of the Rumba and Real Women Have Curves.

She is the co-screenwriter of the film version of her play Real Women Have Curves (2002), starring America Ferrera (Ugly Betty), Lupe Ontiveros, and Ingrid Oliu (Stand and Deliver). The movie garnered much acclaim, including at the 2002 Sundance Film Festival where the film won the "Audience Award" and a "Special Jury Award for Acting." López has written several other screenplays including Loteria for Juarez about the mysterious murders of women in the Mexico/US border town of Ciudad Juárez; ADD Me to the Party, an original comedic screenplay about three Latinas addicted to adrenaline who drive around in an Impala looking for the next distraction; Lola Goes To Roma, a mother-daughter comedy that takes place in Europe; a biopic titled Queen of the Rumba; and a family comedy titled No Place Like Home. In 2013, she wrote and produced the film version of her play Detained in the Desert.

López has won several awards including a Gabriel García Márquez award from Mayor of Los Angeles in 2003. She was also recognized by the WGA as the cover story for the December 2002/January 2003 issue of the prestigious Writers' Guild magazine Written By, entitled "Real Writers Have Courage." López and cowriter George LaVoo won the "Humanitas Award for Screenwriting" for Real Women Have Curves. She was awarded a Screenwriting Fellowship by the California Arts Council for 2001 and in 1988 she was recognized by California Sen. Barbara Boxer as a "woman who has made history in the entertainment industry".

== Notable works ==
=== Simply Maria, or the American Dream ===
Josefina López's first play is Simply Maria, or the American Dream (1987) which she wrote while still in high school at the Los Angeles County High School for the Arts. The play tells the story of Maria, a young, precocious Latina aspiring to be an actor, and her dream of going to college. The story begins in Mexico with Maria's parents eloping. Maria is born, and shortly after they leave for the U.S. her father, Ricardo, tells Maria that in America, with an education, she can have the American dream. Maria believes him and studies hard. However, when she tells her parents she wants to go to college, they order her to get married instead. Maria is so upset she cries herself to sleep and has a nightmare in which her American self and her Mexican self wrestle with each other. She gets married and gives birth to six babies. Her wedding dress attacks her and a giant tortilla squashes her. Maria is awakened by her mother's crying and overhears her confronting Ricardo about his affairs. Maria is shocked by the news and realizes she has to go to college in order to be economically independent of men and have the life that she wants, one that combines the best of her two worlds.

=== Real Women Have Curves ===
Josefina López's signature work is Real Women Have Curves. The play is set in a tiny sewing factory in East Los Angeles in September 1987. It's marked by the issues of gender politics and the Latina immigrant experience. The story is told from the point of view of Ana, the youngest employee at the factory. Ambitious and bright, Ana yearns to go to college, but doesn't have the money. The action follows the course of a summer at the factory, as the women talk about their lives, loves and deepest desires while attempting to meet impossible production deadlines.

In the playwright's notes, Josefina López writes about how she grew up in Los Angeles herself. With the threat of La Migra looming over her childhood, she once saw a meter maid in a corner store and immediately attempted to "act white" out of fear that the official looking person could deport her. After the 1987 Simpson-Rodino Amnesty Act, Josefina Lopez was able to become a legal resident. She reflects on the undocumented people she knew who were afraid to register themselves for fear that the act was a trick. "They, like me, couldn't believe that after hiding and being persecuted for so long they were finally going to have the freedom to live and work in this country" (5). She recounts that before she went to college she worked in a garment factory; those experiences inspired Real Women Have Curves.

Real Women Have Curves (2002) is also an American comedy-drama film that takes place in East Los Angeles. It gained fame after winning the Audience Award for best dramatic film, and the Special Jury Prize for acting in the 2002 Sundance Film Festival. The film went on to receive the Youth Jury Award at the San Sebastian International Film Festival, the Humanitas Prize, the Imagen Award at the Imagen Foundation Awards, and Special Recognition by the National Board of Review. The film was directed by Patricia Cardoso, and stars a young America Ferrera as protagonist Ana García. Josefina Lopez co-authored the screenplay for the film with producer George LaVoo. According to the Sundance Institute, the film gives a voice to young women who are struggling to love themselves and find respect in the United States.

=== Confessions of Women from East L.A. ===
Confessions of Women from East L.A. is a celebration of being Latina and being women in the U.S., this play challenges the stereotypes of Latinas as "virgins, mothers and whores," with the vibrant humor and authentic voices of women from East L.A. telling their stories with imagination and poetry. Four actors play nine unforgettable characters including: Marquez-Bemstein, Ph.D., 35, a woman who encourages Latinas to marry Jewish men in her "How To Be A Super Latina" seminar; Calletana, 40, a street vendor who challenges city hall for her right to earn a living; Lolita Corazon, 25, who teases and punishes men with her powerful sexuality; Yoko Martinez, 28, a Latina who's trying to pass for Japanese; Roxie, 30, a self-defense instructor who accidentally attacks a man who was merely going to ask her for the time; Tiffany, 20, a valley girl and a Chicana activist who finds courage and strength in Frida Kahlo's paintings; Dofia Conception, 55, a grandmother who, after her husband dies, is forced to come to terms with her sexuality when she discovers her husband gave her AIDS; Doija Florinda, 45, a soap opera addict in recovery; and Valentina, 26, a Chicana activist who is trying to organize her people to fight racism and Proposition 187.

=== Boyle Heights ===
Boyle Heights received its world premiere production at CASA 0101 Theater in 2004.

Boyle Heights follows the history of the Rosales family, from a small Mexican town to the burgeoning neighborhood of Boyle Heights in Los Angeles. The story is seen through the eyes of Dahlia, an aspiring writer who is reluctant to get involved in the real world, much less in her familyÂs drama. Her passionate and impulsive family perpetually re-creates conflict spanning generations and borders. First chastised for making education a priority, and then for not being married, Dahlia navigates the colorful and troubled personalities of her family and neighborhood as she attempts to stay true to her most important asset, her integrity. Boyle Heights is the stormy neighborhood where a family ultimately attempts to create a place called home.

=== Hungry Woman In Paris ===
López's first novel, Hungry Woman in Paris, was published in March 2009. Hungry Woman in Paris tells the story of Canela, a journalist and activist, who believes passion is essential to life; but lately passion seems to be in short supply. It has disappeared from her relationship with her fiancé, who is more interested in controlling her than encouraging her. It's absent from her work, where censorship and politics keep important stories from being published. And while her family is full of outspoken individuals, the only one Canela can truly call passionate is her cousin and best friend Luna, who just took her own life. Canela can't recover from Luna's death. She is haunted by her ghost and feels acute pain for the dreams that went unrealized. Canela breaks off her engagement and uses her now un-necessary honeymoon ticket, to escape to Paris. Impulsively, she sublets a small apartment and enrolls at Le Coq Rouge, Paris's most prestigious culinary institute. Cooking school is a sensual and spiritual reawakening that brings back Canela's hunger for life. With a series of new friends and lovers, she learns to once again savor the world around her. Finally able to cope with Luna's death, Canela returns home to her family, and to the kind of life she thought she had lost forever.

In 2013, the stage adaptation of Hungry Woman received its world premiere at CASA 0101 Theater. Under the direction of Corky Dominguez, actress Rachel González led a cast of 12 actors portraying 35 plus roles to tell the story of Canela Guerrero, a Chicano journalist passionate about life and her causes, who breaks off her marriage engagement to use tickets intended for her honeymoon to go to Paris to find herself and meaning in life. Regarding the abridged adaptation of her novel, Josefina López has this to say: "It has been a challenge to write the play adaptation of 'Hungry Woman' because my novel 'Hungry Woman in Paris' is written in first person. The character of Canela Guerrero has so many painful and funny experiences as she journeys through her depression, in search for meaning to fulfill her physical and spiritual hunger. What to take and what to leave out was heart wrenching for me as a writer. For me, 'Hungry Woman in Paris' the novel is a seven course meal, while 'Hungry Woman' the play is a delicious appetizing meal with an extravagant desert."

=== Detained in the Desert ===
Detained in the Desert debuted in 2012 and is López's response to Arizona Senate Bill 1070. The play is Lopez's response to an anti-immigrant atmosphere in Arizona and a rise in violence against Latinos.

Detained in the Desert parallels two completely different people: Sandi Sanchez, a second-generation dark skinned Latina, and Lou Becker, an inflammatory talk show radio host, whose lives converge in the Sonoran desert in Arizona. An Arizona cop racially profiles Sandi, who refuses to show her identification in protest. Her act of rebellion sets her on an unexpected course toward immigrant detention. Conversely, three siblings who have just suffered the loss of their brother due to a hate crime influenced by Lou's racist radio talk show, kidnap him in hopes of seeking justice. While Sandi is being transferred to another immigrant detention center, her I.C.E. bus crashes in the desert. She escapes only to end up Stranded in the desert. Lou is freed by one of his supposedly remorseful kidnappers. Consequently, Sandi and Lou meet in the desert and help each other survive. Both Sandi and Lou come to understand the severity of the plight of the immigrants through a gruesome discovery.

=== Trio Los Machos ===
Trio Los Machos follows the journey of three men who come to the U.S. to work in the fields and eventually make a living playing the music they love. The play is a love letter to Latino men and, an homage to Lopez's father. The play explores the themes of music, aging and male camaraderie set against the backdrop of the Bracero guest worker program (1942 - 1964) between the United States and Mexico. Narrated to the music of Trio Los Panchos, the story covers a chapter of U.S. history seldom talked about as the three friends navigate work, friendship, love as their loyalty to one another becomes tested time and again. The play explores the 50-year friendship of its central characters, Lalo, Nacho and Paco.

Trio Los Machos was played at CASA 0101. The setting of the play took place in East LA during WWII. The play alternates between the past and the present which follows culture changes, local history, and even politics. The play was directed by Edward Padilla and the cast included Miguel Santana, Roberto Garza, and Henry Aceves Madrid. Joesfina Lopez wrote this play in honor of her father.

=== A Cat Named Mercy ===
A Cat Named Mercy received its world premiere production at the CASA 0101 Theater from January 31 – February 23, 2014. The play is a dark comedy about Catalina Rodriguez, a Latina Licensed Vocational Nurse working at Elysian Estates Nursing Home who gets her hours cut, becomes uninsured and is in desperate need of an emergency operation. With the help of a cat she names Mercy, she is divinely guided to do the unthinkable to save her life.

Lopez wrote A Cat Named Mercy to show the problems in society that people face daily. Catalina Rodriguez, a nurse, lives with her blind mother who is unapologetically negative about life. She finds out she has cancer and needs immediate surgery to save her life. To her surprise, the nursing home she works at cuts back her hours causing her to lose her health insurance. In need of money fast Catalina decides to help the citizens at the nursing home check out forever. Through this process Catalina encounters a cat named Mercy who seems to appear out of nowhere.

=== Piñata Dreams ===
Piñata Dreams received its world premiere production at CASA 0101 Theater from December 5–28, 2014. Piñata Dreams is a fantastical, magical journey for the whole family that celebrates piñatas, alebrijes (brightly colored Mexican art sculptures of fantastical creatures), and the courage to be oneself. According to Josefina López, "I''ve always wanted to write a holiday show for children and their families celebrating my Latino heritage and I finally wrote it. This story is inspired by the story of the Alebrijes and the story of the Piñatas. I wanted kids to know this story and for parents to understand that some children are special and are meant to be artists."

Pinata Dreams is the story of a young boy named J.J. who wants to follow in his father's footsteps and become a pinata maker. His vivid imagination creates a world where pinatas and alebrijes come to life. Not only does he enjoy time in this fantasy world, but he must come back to reality. During this adventure he is taught life lessons about the importance of family and culture. In reality, his family who is faced with the competition of a nearby pinata store struggles to keep their family afloat.

=== Drunk Girl ===
Drunk Girl received its world premiere production at CASA 0101 Theater from September 25 – October 18, 2015. Drunk Girl is a series of plays exploring the struggles of women to have power over their bodies, their lives and their destinies. Drunk Girl is a collection of 16 short plays, monologues and sketch pieces. The subject matter, which explores physical abuse and recovery, and objectification and societal attitudes, is for mature audiences only. Individuals under 18-years-of-age must be accompanied by an adult.

According to Josefina López, "As a writer I feel it's important to bring to light difficult and sometimes controversial subject matters which oftentimes aren't discussed openly in public. I want to give voice to those who are afraid to speak out and express their inner truths. In my latest work, Drunk Girl, I candidly explore the very serious topic of physical abuse. The current scandal surrounding actor Bill Cosby, who is in headlines around the world, has brought the topic of rape to the forefront and was the inspiration for one of the pieces I wrote in this collection."

== Other work ==
She taught writing courses at California State University Northridge in the mid-1990s.
