= Real Women Have Curves (play) =

Play by Josefina López

- Original language: English
- Written by: Josefina López
- Characters: Ana; Estela; Carmen; Pancha; Rosali
- Setting: A tiny sewing factory in East Los Angeles

Premiere
- Date: May 25, 1990
- Place: Mission Cultural Center for Latino Arts; San Francisco, California

Real Women Have Curves is a stage play by Josefina López and is set in a tiny sewing factory in East Los Angeles in September 1987. It is marked by the issues of gender politics and the Latina immigrant experience. The story is told from the point of view of Ana, the youngest employee at the factory. Ambitious and bright, Ana yearns to go to college, but does not have the money. The action follows the course of a week at the factory, as the women talk about their lives, loves and deepest desires while attempting to meet impossible production deadlines. Within that week at the factory, the woman face many challenges such as the U.S. Immigration and Customs Enforcement (called La Migra in Spanish slang), troubles with their husbands and other male characters mentioned in the play, judgement from other characters, as well as yearning for dreams that do not seem possible to fulfill.

In the playwright's notes, López writes about how she grew up in Los Angeles herself. With the threat of la migra looming over her childhood, she once saw a meter maid in a corner store and immediately attempted to "act white" out of fear that the official looking person could deport her. After the 1987 Simpson-Rodino Amnesty Act, López was able to become a legal resident. She reflects on the undocumented people she knew who were afraid to register themselves for fear that the act was a trick. "They, like me, couldn't believe that after hiding and being persecuted for so long they were finally going to have the freedom to live and work in this country." She recounts that before she went to college she worked in a garment factory; those experiences inspired Real Women Have Curves.

In 2002, the play was adapted into a film of the same name, directed by Patricia Cardoso and starring America Ferrera as Ana.

== Characters ==
- Ana: the young feminist and recent high school graduate. She is politically active and concerned; she is waiting on her financial aid to come through so she can attend college at her dream school, New York University. She sometimes sneaks away from her work to the bathroom where she has a hidden journal and pen that she writes her true feelings in. At the beginning of the play she is ashamed to be working at the factory, but by the end she realizes how much the women in the factory have taught her that her years of education could not. Getting her temporary residence card soon.
- Estela: the owner of the Garcia Sewing Factory, behind on her payments, kind but hardworking. Described in the play's intro as "plain-looking" and "plump". She is afraid to apply for amnesty because she owes money on some sewing machines, and thus spends most of the play's action being nervous, afraid and driven to complete her large order. She has a huge crush on a man the group jokingly calls "El Tormento"; he takes her for a date and behaves inappropriately, making sexual advances that a smarter woman would have seen coming. Eventually pays off her debts and dreams of owning her own retail boutique one day.
- Carmen: the oldest of the women, mother of Ana and Estela, described as "short" and "large". She is a conventional example of a Latina mother; has a talent for storytelling and a tendency to use a harsh, blunt tone. She speaks her mind on all issues. Uncomfortable within her body, makes judgment on other characters’ appearances, especially her two daughters. By the end of the play she learns to accept herself and embrace her body. Recently became a US resident under the 1987 Simpson-Rodino Amnesty Act.
- Pancha: Smart, sassy, described as a "huge woman". She is very comfortable with herself despite the fact that she cannot have children, something her social conditioning has raised her to expect from life. Her character is, like Carmen, rather conventional, believing that Ana's education will be a turn-off for her future husband. Believes that a woman should endure anything a man does to her if she loves him. López hints that Pancha might be in a sometimes abusive relationship but it is never directly mentioned. Recently became a US resident under the 1987 Simpson-Rodino Amnesty Act.
- Rosali: often acts as the mediator of fights within the group, a little thinner than the others probably because she is constantly dieting. She is described as "sweet and easygoing" by the playwright. Recently became a US resident under the 1987 Simpson-Rodino Amnesty Act.

== Reception ==
While the reception of the play has changed over the years, most critics agree that the play continues to have important modern relevance.

- In 2007, the American Drama Institute argued that Real Women Have Curves “can and should be read as a working-class text” since the play “highlights the difficulties of mediating between the individual and the collective, and the issue of class mobility.”
- In 2012, Arturo J. Aldama noted that “López consistently, creatively, and effectively draws structural connections between the individual and the communal.” Additionally, Lopez “recounts that before she went to college, she worked in a garment factory; those experiences inspired Real Women Have Curves.”
- The 2015 Pasadena Playhouse production was noted for its warmth and humor. Los Angeles Times determined the play “was revolutionary for its time and still, decades later, feels subversive: It puts women center stage, and not rich, glamorous women.”
- The 2017 production by Main Street Players in Miami Lakes credited López’s writing, stating that it “has a well-deserved congratulatory feel that someone is finally speaking on stage for the hard-working blue collar Latina women.”
- A 2018 review of the production at Austin’s Teatro Vivo determined that the show’s “place and relevance in our community are undeniable,” and a similar sentiment was expressed in 2019 in regard to the production at Dallas Theater Center. Artistic director Bill English of the 2020 San Francisco Playhouse Production also believes this play is still relevant, telling BroadwayWorld that “thirty years after its premiere in San Francisco, Real Women Have Curves still carries a potent and empowering message.”
- Yet in 2022, a reviewer for Sonoma County Gazette critiqued the play, arguing that the play’s humorous moments make “for comfortable viewing, but are often to the detriment of helping us understand what these women have to bear as impoverished, invisible and largely powerless Latina immigrants in California.”

== Select Production History ==
- Victory Gardens Theatre in Chicago, IL, October–November 1993
- Depot Theatre in Westport, NY, 2012 Season
- Pasadena Playhouse in Pasadena, CA, September–October 2015
- Douglas Morrisson Theatre in Hayward, CA, August–September 2016
- Main Street Players Theater, February 2017
- Women's Theatre Project in Fort Lauderdale, FL, August 2017
- Emma S. Barrientos Mexican American Cultural Center production, August 2018
- Garry Marshall Theatre in Burbank, CA, October–November 2018
- Dallas Theatre Center at the Kalita Humphreys Theater in Dallas, TX, April–May 2019
- Center Players Dessert Theatre in Freehold, NJ, July–August 2019
- The Public Theatre in San Antonio, TX, September–October 2019
- San Francisco Playhouse in San Francisco, CA, March–April 2020
- Aurora Arts Theatre’s 2021 'Real Women Have Curves, August-September 2021
- Powerstories Theatre, February 2022
- 6th Street Playhouse, May 2022

== Stage musical adaptation ==
A stage musical adaptation of the play premiered at the American Repertory Theater in Cambridge, Massachusetts in 2023. The show was adapted by Lisa Loomer with music and lyrics by Joy Huerta and Benjamin Velez. Sergio Trujillo is the director and choreographer.
