= Evelyn Lorena =

American actress, writer, and filmmaker

- Born: North Carolina, U.S.

Evelyn Lorena is an American actress, writer, and filmmaker based in Los Angeles and Atlanta.

== Early life ==
Lorena was born in North Carolina to Guatemalan immigrant parents. She grew up in Wilmington, North Carolina and is of indigenous Guatemalan descent. She was interested in performance from a young age, first performing in a school play in fifth grade, but didn't decide to pursue it as a career until high school. Although her parents initially discouraged her from pursuing a career in the arts, she was able to gain their support. She attended NYU Tisch School of the Arts.

== Career ==
In the 2010s, Lorena was a member of the Los Angeles-based theatre company CASA 0101. In 2013, she began raising funds to produce an independent webseries, titled Crash Dance. The proof-of-concept would later become the basis for a television pilot.

Lorena then worked with former classmate Samantha Colicchio to adapt a one-act play she had written into a short film, titled For Her.

In 2021, Lorena received a Latinx Inclusion Fellowship from the Los Angeles Latino International Film Festival (LALIFF) and Netflix. She used the grant money to finance the production of her short film, Gabriela, which follows an undocumented young woman as she attempts to join a swim team. The entirety of the project was filmed in Wilmington, North Carolina, with the underwater scenes filmed on a soundstage. In 2022, a rough cut of Gabriela premiered at LALIFF with the final film premiering the following year at the 2023 Atlanta Film Festival. The 16-minute film marked Lorena's first project as a director.
