= Jean Shafiroff =

American philanthropist, author, advocate and socialite

- Born: Jean Lutri
- Citizenship: United States
- Education: Columbia University (BS, MBA)
- Occupations: Philanthropist, author, and socialite
- Years active: 1982 - present
- Notable work: Successful Philanthropy: How to Make a Life by What You Give
- Board member of: The Jewish Board, American Humane, NYC Mission Society, Couture Council of the Museum at FIT, Southampton Hospital Association, French Heritage Society, Casita Maria, New York Women's Foundation, Global Strays, Southampton Animal Shelter Foundation Honorary Board
- Awards: Madeleine Borg Lifetime Service Award, Dina Merrill Award for Public Service, Ellen Hermanson Foundation and Surgeons of Hope honoree
- Website: jeanshafiroff.com

Jean Shafiroff (née Lutri) is an American philanthropist, author, advocate, and socialite. Serving on multiple national and regional philanthropic boards, she is the ambassador and spokesperson for American Humane Feed the Hungry COVID-19 Program. She is the host of the television show "Successful Philanthropy" on LTV.

== Early life ==
Shafiroff, née Jean Lutri, grew up on Long Island, New York. Her parents are Placido Lutri, former music chairman and director of district bands for the Levittown, Long Island, schools, and Rose Lutri, a painter and former textile designer. She graduated from Holy Trinity Diocesan High School in Hicksville, New York, in 1972.

She received an MBA from Columbia Business School.

== Career ==
Following her undergraduate studies, Shafiroff worked as a physical therapist at St. Luke's Hospital in New York City. Later she worked in public finance and in private partnerships on Wall Street, including a post in the corporate finance department of investment bank L.F. Rothschild, Unterberg, Towbin.

=== Philanthropy ===
Shafiroff has been a trustee of the Jewish Board of Family and Children's Services (JBFCS) since 1992 and served as a board member of the Youth Counseling League, a division of JBFCS, from 1998 to 2009. She has served as co-chair of Southampton Bath & Tennis Club Charitable Foundation 2005 to 2020, and as a member of the board of directors from 2001 to 2004.

Shafiroff joined the board of Couture Council, which supports the museum at the Fashion Institute of Technology (FIT), in 2010. In April 2012, Shafiroff was appointed to the board of the French Heritage Society. Later that year, she joined the board of the New York Women's Foundation after having hosted the foundation's annual luncheon fundraiser the previous four years. She is an honorary board member of the Southampton Animal Shelter.

Shafiroff is known for "her leadership in raising money for the Southampton Hospital" and sits on the Southampton Hospital Association board. She chaired the hospital's annual summer gala fundraiser in 2010, 2011 and 2013. Shafiroff has chaired other galas and fundraisers, including the Bicentennial Gala of the NY Mission Society, the Solar One Gala, and the New York City American Cancer Society Gala three times. Shafiroff has also organized and hosted high-profile luncheons for charitable organizations.

In October 2014, Shafiroff was elected to the board of directors of the NYC Mission Society, a nonprofit organization dedicated to helping out families in New York City's impoverished neighborhoods. She serves as a board member for The New York Women's Foundation and American Humane. In 2017, she joined the board of animal rescue group, Global Strays and in 2020 chaired the Viennese Opera Ball in New York. In 2022, Shafiroff was named the “First Lady of Philanthropy of New York” by Rebecca Seawright, on behalf of the New York State Assembly. In November 2022, the 117th US Congress recognized Jean for her work in philanthropy through US Representative Carolyn Maloney of New York, including honors from the French Heritage Society.

=== Writing ===
In March 2016, Shafiroff authored Successful Philanthropy: How to Make a Life by What You Give. The book is about Shafiroff's experiences as a philanthropist and how to get involved in charity work with an introduction by Georgina Bloomberg. She is a regular columnist at Social Life magazine.

- Successful Philanthropy: How to Make a Life by What You Give (2016) ISBN 1578266173

== Recognition ==
Shafiroff was an Ellen Hermanson Foundation and Surgeons of Hope honoree in May and June 2014, respectively. She was also an honoree and recipient of the Madeleine Borg Lifetime Service Award and recipient of the Dina Merrill Award for Public Service from the New York Mission Society in 2014. In June 2016, Shafiroff received the Humanitarian with Heart Award from the American Heart Association. That same year, Shafiroff was honored at the Taste of Hope gala for the American Cancer Society.

Shafiroff has been named by Gotham Magazine as one of the "100 Most Powerful New Yorkers," and was featured in Hamptons Magazine's "Best Dressed List" in 2012. In 2018, Avenue magazine named her to its annual Power Elite list and the Pioneer Chapter of Hadassah named her "Woman of the Year". In 2018, she was named "The First Lady of Philanthropy" by both Hello and ¡Hola! magazines. In 2019, Shafiroff was the Stony Brook Southampton Hospital gala honoree.

== Personal life ==
Shafiroff married Martin D. Shafiroff, managing director at Barclays, in 1982. The couple have two daughters, Jacqueline and Elizabeth.
