= A Dog Year =

2008 television film

- HBO advertising poster
- Written by: George LaVoo
- Story by: Jon Katz
- Directed by: George LaVoo
- Starring: Jeff Bridges; Lauren Ambrose
- Music by: Joseph Vitarelli
- Country of origin: United States
- Original language: English

Production
- Producers: Liz Manne; Frank Doelger
- Cinematography: Frederick Elmes
- Editors: Michael Taylor; Leo Trombetta
- Running time: 80 minutes
- Production company: HBO Films

Original release
- Network: HBO
- Release: September 3, 2009

A Dog Year is a 2009 American made-for-television comedy-drama film written and directed by first-time director George LaVoo and starring Jeff Bridges. It was originally broadcast on HBO on September 3, 2009.

The film is based on the memoir by Jon Katz and adapted by LaVoo. The story centers on a man experiencing a midlife crisis whose world is turned upside down when he adopts a Border Collie crazier than he is.

== Plot ==
Jon Katz faces a midlife crisis. His wife moves out because he was growing too distant, their daughter Emma has moved to a place of her own, and he is left in the house with their two Labrador Retrievers and a severe case of writer's block. A dog breeder who has read his books convinces him to take in an abused and hyperactive Border Collie named Devon.

Devon turns out to be more than Katz expected, destroying his home and fighting with his other dogs. His daughter Emma visits him, clearly concerned, and is present when one of the Labradors dies of a stroke. Exasperated with his attempts to train Devon, Katz gives Emma the other Labrador and moves to Upstate New York, determined that further isolation will aid in both his writing and dog training.

The slower pace of life soon agrees with both Katz and the dog, aided further by a dog trainer, Lois, and helpful neighbor Anthony, who helps Katz build a pen for Devon. He succeeds in training Devon to sit, and the dog begins to heal and be at home with Katz: he doesn't try to escape the house when Katz accidentally left the door open, and proves able to remain in the car with a window open. Katz' experience informs his writing, and a short book pours out of him. Feeling a measure of success, Katz returns home to the city, promising Anthony that he will return to the farm soon.

== Cast ==
- Jeff Bridges as Jonathan "Jon" Katz
- Lauren Ambrose as Emma
- Lois Smith as Lois Blair
- Domhnall Gleeson as Anthony Armstrong
- Welker White as Brenda King
- Elizabeth Marvel as Margo
- Pamela Holden Stewart as Patti
- Deirdre O'Connell as Donna Brady
- Karen Allen as Paula (voice)

== Production ==
Bridges was cast in May, 2006, with production set to start in July that year. It was filmed in part on the farm belong to the book's author, Jon Katz, in Hebron, New York. Bridges wore clothes taken from Katz' own wardrobe.

== Release and reception ==
Once set for theatrical release, the film premiered on HBO on September 3, 2009, after its distributor, Picturehouse, was closed in 2008.

Chuck Bowen of Slant called the film "a lean, appealingly straight-forward little movie" and praised Bridges' performance. Brian Lowry of Variety called the film "stunted and lifeless' and criticised Bridges performance, writing that "other than looking disheveled, Bridges simply can’t seem to unearth much from Jon’s character," and praised the canine actor's performance over his. In The New York Times, Mike Hale praised the cast but wrote that director LaVoo could not rise above the film's sentimentality and TV movie clichés, despite the high production values.

On July 8, 2010, Jeff Bridges was nominated for the Primetime Emmy Award for Outstanding Lead Actor in a Miniseries or Movie.
