= George LaVoo =

American film director

George LaVoo is an American film director, producer, and screenwriter. Real Women Have Curves, for which he was both producer and screenwriter, won the 2002 Sundance Film Festival Dramatic Audience Award. The film was selected for preservation in the Library of Congress’ National Film Registry.

In 1999, he produced Getting to Know You, starring Heather Matarazzo, Zach Braff, and Bebe Neuwirth. In 2006, he wrote Blood Monkey, and his 2008 HBO television film A Dog Year, based on the New York Times bestselling book by Jon Katz, starred Jeff Bridges and was shown at the Tribeca Film Festival. Bridges received a Primetime Emmy Award nomination for Best Actor for his performance. LaVoo is now working as a professor at the School of Visual Arts in New York City.

LaVoo directed and produced the second season (seven episodes) of the social justice web series We Speak NYC, developed by the City of New York to support immigrant communities through narrative storytelling and language access. The series received a New York Emmy Award for Direction (Web Series).

== Critical reception ==
=== Real Women Have Curves ===
Real Women Have Curves received strong critical attention upon its release and has since been widely discussed as a defining work of early-2000s American independent cinema. The film premiered at the Sundance Film Festival in 2002, where it won the Dramatic Audience Award, bringing significant attention to its portrayal of Latina identity, body image, and working-class family life in East Los Angeles.

In retrospective coverage, The New York Times cited Real Women Have Curves as one of the defining independent films of the early 2000s, noting its enduring cultural and social relevance and situating it as an important precursor to later female-centered coming-of-age films.

The film was also widely recognized for introducing America Ferrera in her feature film debut as Ana García. Critics writing at the time and in subsequent reassessments described Ferrera's performance as a breakthrough, noting its emotional directness and its departure from prevailing Hollywood representations of Latina women. Coverage in trade publications including Variety emphasized the film's impact in challenging industry norms around body image and representation, and credited it with establishing Ferrera as a significant new talent in American independent film.

The film's long-term cultural significance has been reinforced through institutional recognition. In 2019, Real Women Have Curves was selected for preservation in the Library of Congress’ National Film Registry, which honors films deemed “culturally, historically, or aesthetically significant.”

The film's influence has extended beyond cinema. A stage musical adaptation premiered on Broadway in 2025. The New York Times included the musical version among its selections for the year's notable theatrical moments, citing the work's continued resonance and reinterpretation for contemporary audiences.

=== Getting to Know You ===
Getting to Know You received thoughtful critical attention in connection with its literary origins and festival exhibition. The film is based on three short stories by American author Joyce Carol Oates, and its adaptation was noted for translating Oates's themes of adolescence, interiority, and emotional vulnerability to the screen.

The film premiered in competition at the Sundance Film Festival and was subsequently selected for the Venice Film Festival, contributing to its profile on the international festival circuit. Following its festival run, the film received theatrical distribution in Italy through Key Films, reflecting sustained interest in European markets.

In New York City, Getting to Know You screened at Film Forum, where it was reviewed by critic Amy Taubin in The Village Voice. Taubin described the film as “a pitch-perfect portrait of adolescence, a film so fragile and uncompromising that you want to throw your arms around it and protect it from the jerks who won't know how special it is,” highlighting its emotional precision and restraint.

== Awards and nominations ==
Year	Award / Organization	Category	Work	Result
2002	Sundance Film Festival	Dramatic Audience Award	Real Women Have Curves	Won
2002	Sundance Film Festival	Special Jury Recognition	Real Women Have Curves	Won
2002	Humanitas Prize	Feature Film Screenwriting	Real Women Have Curves	Won
2003	Gabriel García Márquez Award (City of Los Angeles)	Screenwriting	Real Women Have Curves	Won
2007	National Endowment for the Arts / Theatre Communications Group	Artist-in-Residence Grant	—	Awarded
—	Sundance Film Festival	Official Selection	Frisk	Nominated
—	Sundance Film Festival	Official Selection	Getting to Know You	Nominated
2019	New York Emmy Awards	Direction (Web Series)	We Speak New York	Won
—	Variety	Producers to Watch	—	Won
