= New York Jewish Film Festival =

American festival founded in 1992

- Location: New York City
- Founded: 1992
- Website: thejewishmuseum.org/NYJFF

The New York Jewish Film Festival (NYJFF) is an annual festival in New York City that features a wide array of international films exploring themes related to the Jewish experience. The Jewish Museum and The Film Society of Lincoln Center work in partnership to present the NYJFF every January. Since its creation in 1992, the festival has more than doubled in size and scope. Screenings are typically followed by discussions with directors, actors and film experts. Audience participation is encouraged.

The festival celebrates the Jewish experience and explores Jewish identity. The NYJFF seeks to broaden perceptions of the Jewish experience from a multitude of perspectives and nationalities. It presents an opportunity to discover new and challenging films that are often otherwise hard to find.

== Festival highlights ==
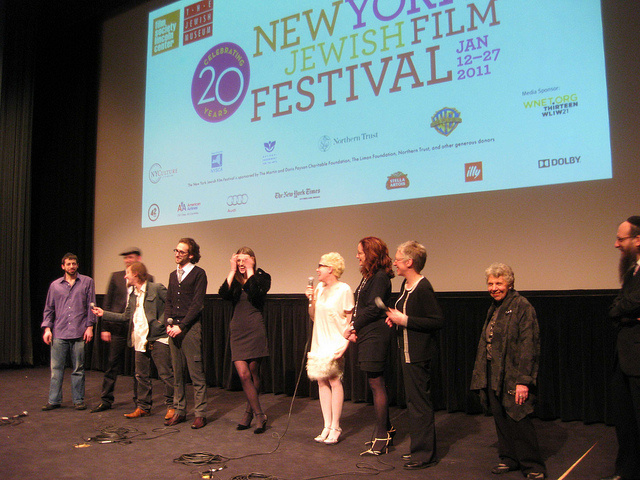
Cast and crew of Romeo and Juliet at The Jewish Museum

Key works and noteworthy presentations of the past few years have included:

- The N.Y.C. premiere of Koch (2013 Festival), directed by Neil Barsky
- The N.Y. premiere of Hannah Arendt (2013 Festival), directed by Margarethe von Trotta
- The N.Y.C. premiere of AKA Doc Pomus (2013 Festival), directed by Will Hechter and Peter Miller
- The World premiere of Strangers No More (2011 Festival), a short film directed by Karen Goodman and Kirk Simon, and nominated for an Academy Award
- The N.Y. premiere of Mahler on the Couch (2011 Festival), directed by father-son duo Percy Adlon and Felix Adlon
- The N.Y. premiere of The Matchmaker (2011 Festival), directed by Avi Nesher
- The U.S. premiere of Saviors in the Night (2010 Festival), directed by Ludi Boeken
- The N.Y. premiere of Ajami (2010 Festival), directed by Scandar Copti and Yaron Shani, which was subsequently nominated for an Academy Award for Best Foreign Language Film
- The U.S. premiere of My Mexican Shiva (2007 Festival), by Mexican filmmaker Alejandro Springall
- The screening of Nowhere in Africa (2003 Festival), directed by Caroline Link, which won an Academy Award in 2002 for Best Foreign Language Film

Additional noteworthy films have included:

- Michael Haneke's The Castle (1998 Festival)
- Alain Resnais's Stavisky (1993 Festival)
- Jeroen Krabbé's Left Luggage (1999 Festival), featuring Maximilian Schell and Isabella Rossellini
- Andrea Frazzi and Antonio Frazzi's The Sky is Falling (Il Cielo Cade) (2001 Festival), featuring Isabella Rossellini and Jeroen Krabbé
- Pierre Grimblat's Lisa (2001 Festival), featuring Jeanne Moreau and Marion Cotillard

== History ==
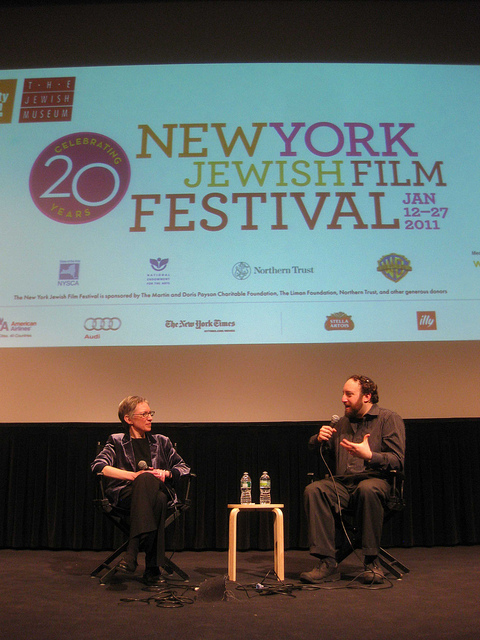
Discussion after the screening of Crime after Crime with Aviva Weintraub (NYJFF director) and attorney Joshua Safran (one of the protagonists)

The birth of the NYJFF was linked to the fall of the Berlin Wall and the break-up of the Soviet Union. On the heels of liberation, a torrent of cinematic work—new films by young directors as well as long-suppressed older works—flooded into the West. Recognizing an extraordinary opportunity to bring untold stories to New York audiences for the first time, the New York Jewish Film Festival was launched in January, 1992 in a continuing partnership between The Jewish Museum and the Film Society of Lincoln Center. The festival includes feature-length and short films, documentaries, and animated and experimental films.

== Special presentations ==
The Festival has also featured sidebar presentations such as premieres of restored archival prints and screenings of rarely viewed films.

The 2013 Festival hosted filmmaker brothers Josh and Benny Safdie, for an evening of conversation and presentation of five of their short films, followed by their 2009 film Daddy Longlegs. The festival also featured a sidebar presentation organized by the film critic and author J. Hoberman, which included clips from what he considers compelling Jewish horror movies, along with a screening of Edgar G. Ulmer's 1934 classic The Black Cat.

The 2011 Festival presented three restored films: Lies My Father Told Me (dir. Ján Kadár), a 1975 film about a boy living in a Montreal Jewish community in the 1920s; the 1956 film Singing in the Dark (dir. Max Nosseck), one of the first American feature films to dramatize the Holocaust, starring Moishe Oysher as a concentration camp survivor; and the 1930 Tevye (dir. Maurice Schwartz), restored with new English subtitles.

The 2010 Festival presented N.Y. premieres of restored prints of Falk Harnack's The Axe of Wandsbek (based on Arnold Zweig's novel) about a man who was a paid executioner for the Nazis; and Henry Lynn's classic 1935 Yiddish melodrama, Bar Mitzvah, which features vaudeville jokes, songs, and dancing, and stars actor Boris Thomashefsky in his only film performance.

== See also ==
- New York Film Festival
- New York Sephardic Jewish Film Festival
