= Brian Sites =

American actor (born 1983)

- Born: June 21, 1983 (age 43); Visalia, California, U.S.
- Occupation: Actor
- Years active: 2000–2004

Brian Sites (born June 21, 1983) is an American actor. He has guest-starred in television series like 7th Heaven, Boston Public, Crossing Jordan, The Ellen Show, CSI: Crime Scene Investigation and had brief recurring roles on 8 Simple Rules and That's So Raven.

He also had roles in the feature films Gigli, Real Women Have Curves and Terminator 3: Rise of the Machines.

== Filmography ==
=== Film ===
Year	Title	Role	Notes
2002	Real Women Have Curves	Jimmy	
2003	Terminator 3: Rise of the Machines	Bill Anderson	
2003	Gigli	High School Kid #2	

=== Television ===
Year	Title	Role	Notes
2001	Virtually Casey	Dax	Television film
2001	7th Heaven	Mick	Episode: "Teased"
2001	The Ellen Show	Tug	2 episodes
2002	Crossing Jordan	Derrek Mobley	Episode: "Blood Relatives"
2002	Boomtown	Taylor Gates	Episode: "Pilot"
2002	The Grubbs	Jimmy Grubb	Episode: "Pilot"
2002–2003	8 Simple Rules	Jason	3 episodes
2003	That's So Raven	Max	2 episodes
2003	Boston Public	Mark Thomas	Episode: "Chapter Sixty-Nine"
2003	CSI: Crime Scene Investigation	Benny Lizzio	Episode: "Coming of Rage"
2004	Then Comes Marriage	Eddie	Television film
