= Eva & Leon =

- Film poster
- Directed by: Émilie Cherpitel
- Written by: Émilie Cherpitel
- Produced by: Candice Zaccagnino
- Starring: Clotilde Hesme; Florian Lemaire
- Cinematography: Laurent Machuel
- Edited by: Guerric Catala
- Music by: Jonathan Morali
- Production company: ElianeAntoinette
- Distributed by: Pyramide Distribution
- Release date: 17 June 2015
- Running time: 76 minutes
- Country: France
- Language: French

Eva & Leon (French title: L'Echappée Belle) is a 2015 French drama film written and directed by Émilie Cherpitel. The movie was a submission to the 82nd Academy Awards for Best Foreign Language Film.

== Plot ==
The movie is about a privileged woman and an orphaned boy who become friends.

Leon and his older brother, Arnaud, were abandoned in a park in Lyon.

They are seen as outcasts by a social worker, who considers both the brothers mentally ill and the only solution is sending them to a children’s home.

With the help of two teachers, Leon and Arnaud are put in an English-language school run by a kind but rough-around-the-edges teacher called Isabelle (Nicole Delecroix).

== Cast ==
- Clotilde Hesme as Eva
- Florian Lemaire as Léon
- Peter Coyote as The father
- Keziah Jones as John
- Clotilde Courau as Lucie
- Yannick Choirat as Simon
- Idit Cebula as Madame Agostini
- Grégoire Bonnet as a psychiatrist
- Joséphine de La Baume as Simone
- Christophe Dimitri Réveille as Jérôme
- Frédéric Beigbeder as Richard
- David Serero as the Italian Crooner
