= We Speak NYC =

American TV series

- Genre: Drama; Comedy
- Created by: Mayor’s Office of Immigrant Affairs (MOIA) & The City University of New York (CUNY)
- Written by: David Hellman; Sam Seifnourian; Sandra Poster; Kayhan Irani; Anthony Tassi
- Starring: Arturo Castro; Jennica Carmona; Barbara Eliodorio; Irma Estella La Guerre; Sándor Técsy; Alberto Vazquez; Angel Garcia Clemente; Alexander Flores; Kenneth Maharaj; Bones Rodriguez; Shirine Babb; Antonia Rey; Arunima Roy; Brianna Fernandez; Arisael Rivera; Savannah Renée Rodriguez; Ariel Pacheco; David Serero; Besanya Santiago; Sonam Wangdue; Simone Xi; Robert Garcia Cabrera; Soto Silva; Julissa Roman
- Composers: Don DiNicola; Douglas J. Cuomo; Rick Baitz
- Country of origin: United States
- No. of seasons: 2
- No. of episodes: 20

Production
- Executive producers: Leslee Oppenheim; Anthony Tassi; David Hellman; Kunchok Dolma; Andrzej Krakowski
- Producers: Bob Perkis; Sam Seifnourian; Todd Broder; George LaVoo; Javier Gonzales
- Production location: New York City
- Cinematography: Sergei Franklin; Bob Lechterman; Alejandro Mejía
- Running time: 20–25 minutes (per episode)

Original release
- Network: WNYE-TV

We Speak NYC is an American television series that depicts the lives of working class immigrants who come from all over the world to make New York City their home. It's created by the Mayor's Office of Immigrant Affairs and The City University of New York with the purpose of helping adult immigrants for whom English is a second language to improve their English by watching the series and also to learn about their rights to City and community services.

We Speak NYC episodes address issues of relevance to adult immigrants, such as navigating the school system, advocating for healthcare solutions and finding free or low-cost health insurance, responding to domestic violence, getting help with stress and anxiety, learning about and asserting your worker rights, getting free immigration legal help, accessing social services, preparing for a career, and many other important topics. Previously known as We Are New York, its purpose is to help adult immigrants, for whom English is a second language, to improve their understanding of English by watching the series, and also to learn about their rights to city and community services.

In May 2018, the Mayor's Office of Immigrant Affairs launched the second season of We Speak NYC.

== Cast and characters ==
=== Season 1 ===
==== Regular cast ====
- Arturo Castro as Jorge
- Jennica Carmona as Carmen
- Irma Estella La Guerre as Rosa
- Alberto Vazquez as Fernando
- Sándor Técsy as Sasha
- Mahadeo Shivraj as Rishi
- Angel Garcia Clemente as Juan
- Vincent D'Arbouze as Pierre
- Alexander Flores as Diego
- Kenneth Maharaj as Abdul
- Bones Rodriguez as Mario
- Antonia Rey as Mrs. Medina
- Shirine Babb as Efie

=== Season 2 ===
==== Regular cast ====
- Arunima Roy as Shumi
- Tien-Li Wu as Ms. Wu
- Brianna Fernandez as Gabriela
- Arisael Rivera as César
- Savannah Renée Rodriguez as Xio
- Ariel Pacheco as Rolando
- Barbara Eliodorio as Claudia
- David Serero as Omar
- Besanya Santiago as Silvia
- Jose Martinez as Luis
- Jane Gendelman as Mrs. Belkina
- Sonam Wangdue as Sonam
- Pedro Fontaine as Gidel
- Sumant Gupta as Osman
- Simone Xi as Lian
- Robert Garcia Cabrera as Martin
- Soto Silva as Rafaela
- Julissa Roman as Alicia

== Episodes ==
=== Series overview ===
Season	Episodes	Originally released
1	10	June 26, 2009
2	10	July 8, 2018

=== Season 1 (2009) ===
We Speak NYC previously known as We Are New York (WANY) is an Emmy Award-winning educational television series produced by the NYC Mayor's Office of Immigrant Affairs and The City University of New York in 2009. The 10-episode comedic drama is based on true-to-life stories of immigrants making their way in New York City. Each episode provides useful information on essential City services and shows how people working across ethnic lines can access resources and solve common problems.

Immigrants learning English have found the show especially helpful because the production values (e.g., actors speaking clearly and slowly directly into the camera; repetition of key vocabulary; subtitles in six languages: Arabic, Bengali, Chinese, English, Russian and Spanish etc., make the content accessible in ways unlike any other English-language TV show. Viewers want to watch the show because they can understand the English, the storyline is filled with topics that are relevant to their everyday lives, and the cast reflects the demographics of the city's immigrant population. The working class immigrant characters of We Speak NYC contend with asthma and diabetes; they find ways to support their children's education and prevent teenagers from dropping out; and they figure out the banking system.

No.	Title	Directed by	Written by	Original release date
1	"New Life Café"	José Luis Orbegozo	David Hellman, Sandy Poster & Kayhan Irani	June 27, 2009
Rosa is a chef whose dream is to open a new café in Washington Heights. But before the big opening, her doctor gives her some serious news. She has diabetes and has to change how she eats. How can she open her Dominican café if she has to change everything she cooks? Rosa isn't sure what to do, but her friends and family help her make important small changes to manage her diabetes. In the end, will this be enough to make Rosa's dream come true?
2	"No Smoking"	Luis Argueta	David Hellman, Sandy Poster & Kayhan Irani	July 4, 2009
Everyone knows Sasha, the Champion Winter Swimmer of Brighton Beach. Every year his club goes swimming in the winter to raise money for the children's hospital. Sasha always raises the most money. But this year, he has a bad cough from smoking and can't swim on the big day. He has to quit smoking if he wants to swim again. Sasha gets help from his best friend and his wife. But, will it be enough?
3	"The Wedding"	Katja Esson	David Hellman, Sandy Poster & Kayhan Irani	July 11, 2009
The band is lost. The photographer is sick. The dress is too big. The wedding is tomorrow! A group of plucky New Yorkers each gets their big break to work at the wedding. Can they pull it off in time?
4	"Welcome Parents"	Luis Argueta	David Hellman, Sandy Poster & Kayhan Irani	July 18, 2009
Carmen and Fatima have children who go to the same school. It is time for the Parent-Teacher Conference. Last year, Carmen and Fatima didn't understand the teacher. This year things will be different. They call other parents and work together to practice their questions. Their husbands help out, too. Carmen and Fatima become leaders in their children's school.
5	"Stay in School"	Luis Argueta	David Hellman, Sandy Poster & Kayhan Irani	July 25, 2009
Diego is a teenager from Mexico who loves to play soccer. His mother sends him to live with his aunt and uncle in New York City to get a good education. But life in New York is not like Mexico. School is hard and confusing. Diego decides to quit school and get a job. When his aunt and uncle find out, they are shocked. But when Diego tells them his fears, they listen patiently. They decide to help him find information and advice so he can stay in school. Together, they try to sort things out. Will it be enough? Will Diego stay in school?
6	"Love and Money"	Darren Methlie	David Hellman, Sandy Poster & Kayhan Irani	August 1, 2009
Sophie works in a nail salon. She meets Jorge who works in a restaurant. They like each other. Jorge wins a free dinner at his restaurant and invites Sophie for their first date. The restaurant is so expensive that Sophie thinks Jorge is rich. Sophie's dress is so fancy that Jorge thinks she's rich, too! With the help of their friends, Jorge and Sophie learn a lot about money, banking, and love in New York City. In the end, will they tell each other the truth?
7	"The Hospital"	Luis Argueta	David Hellman, Sandy Poster & Kayhan Irani	August 7, 2009
Can art heal the sick? A nurse encourages a patient to start drawing again. The patient has a dramatic recovery and inspires the hospital workers to make their own art. It turns out, many of the workers are artists. Clayton in housekeeping is an abstract painter. Halina in food services is a photographer. But, an art gallery in a hospital?
8	"Stop Domestic Violence"	Paul Epstein	David Hellman, Sandy Poster & Kayhan Irani	August 15, 2009
A group of actors are putting on a play in a community theater. The actors are from different countries. They are practicing a very important play. The play is about a difficult subject - domestic violence.
9	"Asthma: The Soap Opera"	Marc Lesser	David Hellman, Sandy Poster & Kayhan Irani	August 22, 2009
Mario is the star of a TV soap opera. He loves Angela, but her father is against their love. Today they are filming the last scene of the show, and Angela finally leaves Mario and his son. But there is a problem: the story is too sad for Mario! He stops the filming and asks the director to change the story. He wants a happy ending! He wants to take care of his son, and he wants Angela back. The director wants to finish filming, but agrees to Mario’s idea. Will Mario win Angela back? Will he be the hero father he was meant to be?
10	"The Storm"	Todd Broder	David Hellman & Sandy Poster	December 2, 2013
It's a hot summer day in New York City. Aku is going to the beach. Then she is meeting her parents for a picnic in the park. The plans are all made. Everyone is ready for a day of sun, fun, good food and friends. But no one planned for what happened next. Soon after Aku leaves, there's a storm alert on TV: flood warnings... hazardous weather conditions... possible tornado... It sounds terrible! Kojo and his friend Alberto go to find Aku. Efie waits at home with her friend, Isabel, in case Aku returns. Cell phone service goes out. The electricity goes out, too. Mrs. Chen, a neighbor, comes over and the women talk about planning for emergencies. Mrs. Chen and Isabel comfort Efie. Finally, Kojo and Alberto return, but without Aku...

=== Season 2 (2018-2022) ===
We Speak NYC's second season features important issues facing New Yorkers, including mental health, workers’ rights, senior care, food help, immigrant rights, work search and early childhood education. Stories in season 2 weaves into a description of the services and resources available from the city. It's all part of empowering New Yorkers to advocate for their needs and thereby making NYC "the fairest big city in the country".

No.	Title	Directed by	Written by	Original release date
1	"Shumi's Pantry"	George LaVoo	David Hellman & Sam Seifnourian	July 8, 2018
It’s Shumi’s last year before college. She gets a part-time job at a local supermarket to help her mother pay the bills. And she volunteers at a food pantry to help the community. “You’re doing too much,” says her mom. “You need to focus on school!” Shumi is a hero to a lot of people. Will she manage it all and become a hero to you too?
2	"The Seed for a Good Life"	George LaVoo	David Hellman & Sam Seifnourian	July 15, 2018
Bad news: César loses his job. Good news: He finds two part-time jobs. But César is not satisfied. He wants a career. But how do you get one? Join César, Gabriela, Simon, Jian and Nana Aidoo on the search for the seed for a good life
3	"Rolando's Rights"	George LaVoo	David Hellman & Sam Seifnourian	July 22, 2018
Rolando is a construction worker. His wife, Silvia, is a domestic worker. They are heroes who build this city and help keep it strong. But what can they do if their companies rip them off and don’t give them paid sick leave or other worker rights? Who can help them?
4	"Making New Friends"	George LaVoo	David Hellman & Sam Seifnourian	July 29, 2018
“I’m not coming home for dinner,” Abuelo Luis says on the phone to his daughter, Silvia, “I’m going to my girlfriend’s house.” “Your girlfriend,” says Silvia, “Who is your girlfriend?” Silvia doesn’t know that it is Mrs. Belkina, her own client. Rent freezes and senior centers ...
5	"Sonam's Mom"	George LaVoo	David Hellman & Sam Seifnourian	August 5, 2018
Samten, Sonam's mom, is coming to America for the very first time. Sonam is a taxi driver but when his mom arrives in NYC she gets a ride with Osman, a different taxi driver. Sonam is busy helping his friend get free, safe immigration legal help. He doesn’t know his mom is already here. How will they meet?
6	"Crossing the Street"	George LaVoo	David Hellman & Sam Seifnourian	August 12, 2018
In Sunset Park, Brooklyn, Lian is looking for a great Pre-K to get experience to become a teacher. Martin is looking for a great Pre-K for his daughter. In this classic tale of New York City, where people and cultures of the world come together, Lian and Martin cross the street to meet.
7	"Rafaela's Test"	George LaVoo	David Hellman & Sam Seifnourian	August 19, 2018
Rafaela has a panic attack on the day of her High School Equivalency Test. She goes to the emergency room, where a doctor tells her about NYC Well, a City service that helps people manage stress and anxiety. Her family and her friend are very worried about her. Join them in this important story as they learn how to support each other and thrive.
8	"CensusGirl"	Marc Lesser	David Hellman & Sam Seifnourian	April 19, 2020
The library is full. People from all over the world are united by their love of learning. Suddenly, there's a WHOOSH - It's CensusGirl. She's here just in time to tell the truth about the census and why it is so important to all immigrant New Yorkers.
9	"Count Us In"	Marc Lesser	David Hellman & Sam Seifnourian	April 19, 2020
Papa doesn't know the purpose of the census. He doesn't understand why it is so important to his wife, his son and his daughter. How can they convince him to say, "Count us in!" Watch the show, join the selfie, and get counted.
10	"Shola's Voice"	Marc Lesser	David Hellman & Sam Seifnourian	October 10, 2021
Shola, an employee at a community TV station, finds her voice speaking about democracy, immigration, education, and other issues of importance to you, your family, and the times we live in. What difference can a voice make? Watch Shola’s Voice and discover the power of your own voice.

== Reception ==
The series received positive reviews. Mayor Bill de Blasio praised the series and its unique mission. "Effective English learning programs like We Speak NYC open new doors for New Yorkers," said Mayor Bill de Blasio. "Though we are a city that proudly speaks over 150 languages, many residents want to improve their English language skills, and we want to meet them with the tools to do it. Empowering immigrant communities with the skills and knowledge to take advantage of more opportunities is how we make the ultimate city of immigrants an even better place for all of our residents."

In May 2019, We Speak NYC received its third NY Emmy Award for Rolando's Rights episode in the category for Informational/Instruction Programming.
