= Lisa Loomer =

American playwright and screenwriter (born 1950)

- Born: 1950 (age 75–76); New York City, U.S.
- Education: New York University Tisch School of the Arts
- Occupations: Playwright, screenwriter, actress
- Writing career
- Notable works: The Waiting Room Living Out Roe
- Notable awards: Jane Chambers Playwriting Award Susan Smith Blackburn Prize; Kennedy Center Fund for New American Plays Award; Back Stage West Garland Award for Playwriting; Imagen Award American Theatre Critics Association Steinberg New Play Award

Lisa Loomer (born 1950) is an American playwright and screenwriter who has also worked as an actress and stand-up comic. She is best known for her play The Waiting Room (1994), in which three women from different time periods meet in a modern doctor's waiting room, each suffering from the effects of their various societies' cosmetic body modification practices (foot binding, corsetry, and breast implantation). She also co-wrote the screenplay for the film Girl, Interrupted. Many of her plays deal with the experiences of Latinas and immigrant characters. Others deal with social and political issues through the lens of contemporary family life. Beyond that, Loomer's play The Waiting Room discusses issues such as body image, breast cancer, and non-Western medicine.

== Early life ==
Lisa Loomer was born in New York and moved to Mexico with her family in her late teens. She is of Spanish and Romanian ancestry. Loomer studied theatre at Brandeis University and New York University's Tisch School of the Arts.

== Career ==
Lisa Loomer began her career as an actress and comedienne. Her first work for theater was A Crowd of Two at the American Place Theatre. This was followed by a one-woman show, All By Herselves, at the Westside Arts Theatre. She began writing plays at the Intar Playwrights Lab, under the direction of Maria Irene Fornes. Her first play Birds was produced by South Coast Rep.

Lisa Loomer's play Roe, about Roe v. Wade, was originally commissioned through the Oregon Shakespeare Festival's American Revolutions program. It was first produced at OSF in a production that traveled to Arena Stage and Berkeley Rep. It received the Jane Chambers Playwriting Award and the Pen Award.

Her play Homefree was commissioned and developed at Denver Center Theater Company before receiving its world premiere in Los Angeles at the Road Theatre.

Café Vida, about female gang members, was presented at the Los Angeles Theatre Center by the Cornerstone Theatre Company in partnership with Homeboy Industries, and was nominated for an Ovation Award for Best Play.

Two Things You Don't Talk About at Dinner had its world premiere at the Denver Center for the Performing Arts.

Distracted had its world premiere at the Mark Taper Forum and was subsequently produced at the Oregon Shakespeare Festival. The play was produced at the Roundabout Theatre Company in New York in a production starring Cynthia Nixon and has subsequently been produced in theatres throughout the U.S.

Living Out had its world premiere at the Mark Taper Forum and was produced at the Second Stage Theater in New York. It has been produced at such theaters as Seattle Rep, Milwaukee Rep, The Denver Center, and Theatreworks, often in bi-lingual productions, as well as in Israel, Europe, and Mexico.

Her play The Waiting Room went from the Williamstown Theater Festival to the Mark Taper Forum to highly successful productions at Arena Stage and Trinity Rep, and then to the Vineyard Theatre in New York. It has been widely produced nationally and internationally.

Expecting Isabell had its world premiere at Arena Stage and its west coast premiere at the Mark Taper Forum. It has been produced in New York and nationally.

Bocón!, a political fable for young audiences, began at the Taper and has been seen throughout the country, from the Kennedy Center, to Seattle's Group Theater and the La Jolla Playhouse, as well as in Germany, Alaska, and Mexico.

For the Cornerstone Theatre Company, she also wrote Broken Hearts, produced at the Los Angeles Theatre Center.

Other plays by Loomer which have been performed publicly include Maria, Maria, Maria, Maria! (Mixed Blood), Accelerando (Odyssey Theatre Ensemble), and Looking for Angels (The Public Theater).

Loomer is an alumna of New Dramatists and the recipient of two grants from the National Endowment for the Arts and a grant from the New York Foundation for the Arts. Awards include the Jane Chambers Award (twice), the Susan Smith Blackburn Prize, the Kennedy Center Fund for New American Plays Award, a Garland Award, a Lurie Foundation Award, an Ovation Award, and the American Theatre Critics Association Award (twice). She has also received an Imagen Award for positive portrayals of Latinos in all media. Her plays have been selected for the Otis Guernsey Jr./Burns Mantle anthologies The Best Plays of 1994–1995, The Best Plays of 1998–1999, and The Best Plays of 2003-2004. Loomer's works have been published by Dramatists Play Service, TCG, Dramatic Publishing, and Arte Publico Press. Roe, The Waiting Room, and Living Out are widely taught in university drama programs, Women's Studies programs, and Latino Studies programs.

Loomer also writes for film and television, both comedy and drama. She was a supervising producer for the second season of Love Is… on OWN. Her films include Girl, Interrupted, and Nappily Ever After for Netflix. Loomer has written TV pilots for HBO, CBS, Fox, and Showtime.

Loomer adapted the play Real Women Have Curves into a stage musical of the same name that premiered in 2023.

== Awards ==
Loomer has won the Jane Chambers Playwriting Award (in 1994 for The Waiting Room), the Susan Smith Blackburn Prize, the Kennedy Center Fund for New American Plays Award, a Back Stage West Garland Award for Playwriting (in 2003 for Living Out), the Imagen Award for positive portrayals of Latinos in all media, and American Theatre Critics Association Steinberg New Play Award (in 1995 for The Waiting Room and in 1999 for Expecting Isabel.) She was also the recipient of two grants from the National Endowment for the Arts, and one from the New York Foundation for the Arts.

== Select plays ==
Play Title	Premiere date	Premiere Theatre	Premiere City	Premiere Reviews	ISBN for published version of play
Chain of Life	1990	Renegade Theatre Company's One Act Play Festival at the United Synagogue of Hoboken	Hoboken, NJ	New York Times	
The Waiting Room	1994	Mark Taper Forum	Los Angeles	Variety	ISBN 0-8222-1594-2
Maria! Maria! Maria! Maria!	1996	Mixed Blood Theatre Company	Minneapolis, MN	Mac Weekly	
Expecting Isabel	October 7, 1998	Arena Stage	Washington, DC	CurtainUp	ISBN 0-8222-1995-6
Broken Hearts: A B.H. Mystery	November 12, 1999	Cornerstone Theatre Company at the Los Angeles Theatre Center	Los Angeles	CurtainUp	
Living Out	Jan 18, 2003	Mark Taper Forum	Los Angeles	Curtain Up Variety TalkinBroadway.com	ISBN 978-0-8222-1994-1 ISBN 0822219948
Distracted	March 15, 2007	Mark Taper Forum	Los Angeles	Blog Critics Magazine LA Times Variety	
Roe	April 20, 2016	Oregon Shakespeare Festival	Ashland, OR	New York Times	
