= Ingrid Oliu =

American actress

Ingrid Oliu (born October 9, 1963) is an American actress. She played the role of Guadalupe "Lupe" Escobar in Stand and Deliver, voiced Renee Montoya in Batman: The Animated Series, and co-starred as Estela Garcia in the 2002 film Real Women Have Curves.
