= CASA 0101 =

Theater company and community arts space

Coordinates: 34.0446°N 118.2136°W

CASA 0101 is a theater company and community arts space in Boyle Heights, a neighborhood in Los Angeles, California. It was founded by Josefina López in 2000 to bring art and live theater programs to the community she grew up in.

== History ==
CASA 0101 spent 11 years at its original location—a converted former bridal shop. In 2011, it moved to a fully equipped 99-seat theater, with an art gallery and a dedicated classroom. This space is now renamed "Little Casa" and is one block away from its original site. Both spaces are a part of CASA 0101. Mainstage productions and art exhibits featuring Angelino artists are presented year-round at CASA 0101 Theater, while smaller plays and workshop productions are presented at Little Casa. The theater is known nationally for hosting productions with a social justice narrative, often focusing on the Latinx identity and providing an opportunity for other marginalized voices to take the stage.

== Productions ==
CASA 0101 has produced many shows that have received acclaim across Los Angeles. These also highlight the art venue's central mission to bring inclusive productions to the largely Latinx neighborhood.

“Real Women Have Curves” is written by Josefina Lopez and was performed at CASA 0101 in 2006. This coming-of-age story focuses on a young Latina in Los Angeles who is trying to navigate her dream of going to college with her family's limited financial resources and traditional gender roles. Instead of casting professional actors for the show, Boyle Heights community members played the characters whose lives were similar to their own. These cast members were able to bring their life experiences to the characters and offered them a space to communicate the hardships of immigration, a lower socioeconomic status, and other marginalized groups.

Since 2012 “Chicanas, Cholas, y Chisme”, a play festival, has been debuting a multitude of short plays at CASA 0101. The festival was founded by Josefina Lopez, Lindsey Hayley, and Elena Dominguez. The purpose of this play was to give a voice and experience to Latinas in the community who were aspiring writers, directors, and actors, “making it an entirely Latina driven production”. The festival has now produced more than 100 plays. The "Chicanas, Chola's y Chisme" festival has sold out many shows at CASA 0101.

“Aladdin: the dual language edition” was a 2017 CASA 0101 production produced in partnership with El Centro Del Pueblo, TNH Productions, and Los Angeles City Council Member Gill Cedillo's committee. The Disney story was performed in both English and Spanish for audience members of both speaking communities to enjoy. Creating a dual language production gave more opportunities for community members to experience live theater and it was well received among CASA 0101's diverse audience.

== Arts education ==
In addition to producing a season of professional shows, CASA 0101 also offers year-round, free arts education classes for youth, and low-cost classes for adults. Acting and writing are offered year-round, while specialty classes such as improv, filmmaking, puppetry, and dance are offered seasonally. Many of the youth and adult courses give participants the opportunity to perform or present the material they have been working on to the Boyle Heights community.

== Financial hardship ==
In January 2018, Lopez announced that Casa 0101 was experiencing financial hardships and was considering closing. This was at least partially caused by state regulations required the theater to pay theater volunteers as employees (including 3 years of back pay). After a multi-tiered fundraising effort focusing on dedicated membership to the theater, recruiting new board members, and local funding, it was announced in December 2018 that the theater would remain open for a 2019 season. CASA 0101 continues to host fundraising efforts via private events with performances, food, and dance and making direct donations available.

== Boyle Heights Museum ==
CASA 0101 became home to the Boyle Heights Museum in November 2018, partnering with the University of Southern California (USC) Center for Diversity and Democracy. Also co-founded by Josefina López, the museum embraces the neighborhood's rich multicultural immigrant histories and preserves the spirit of community organizing, resistance to non representational power, and empathy that surpasses racial boundaries. Hosting the museum at CASA 0101 encourages theater goers, history buffs, and all Angelinos to learn about the community's history and celebrate the contributions of Mexican-Americans and other marginalized groups to Los Angeles, and broadly the United States.
