= Benjamin Velez =

American composer and lyricist

- Born: 1988 (age 36–37); Miami, Florida
- Genres: Musical theater
- Occupation(s): Composer, Lyricist
- Website: www.benjaminvelez.com

Benjamin Velez (born 1988) is an American composer and lyricist.

== Early life ==
Velez was born in Miami, Florida. He is a graduate of Columbia University where he studied film and wrote the 114th annual Varsity Show.

== Career ==
Velez joined the BMI Lehman Engel Musical Theater Workshop in 2010, where he developed multiple projects, including Afterland, Starblasters, and Borderline.

With book writer and co-lyricist Katie Hathaway, Velez developed Afterland at the Yale Institute for Music Theater (2014), the York Theater (2016), and as a part of several concert series in New York City, including Cutting Edge Composers and a One Night Stand at Ars Nova (2018). Starblasters had a reading at Dixon Place in 2018.

Velez wrote the score for Borderline, an original musical created with book writer Aryanna Garber, which won the 2018 Weston Playhouse New Musical Award and opened the 2019 O’Neill National Musical Theater Conference.

Velez wrote the music and co-wrote the lyrics (with David Kamp) for Kiss My Aztec, a new musical from John Leguizamo directed by Tony Taccone. It was developed at the Public Theater and premiered at Berkeley Repertory Theater and La Jolla Playhouse in 2019, where it received critical acclaim. Kiss My Aztec had its East Coast premiere at Hartford Stage in 2022.

In 2023, Velez was commissioned by the Public Theater to write a musical adaptation of Shakespeare's The Tempest for its Public Works program, directed by Laurie Woolery. It premiered in August 2023 at Shakespeare in the Park and was the final production at the Delacorte Theater in Central Park before its planned 18-month renovation. The production starred Renée Elise Goldsberry as Prospero and was a New York Times Critic's Pick.

Velez, alongside Joy Huerta, provided the music and lyrics for the musical Real Women Have Curves, a new musical based on the play of the same name. The show premiered in 2023 at the A.R.T. (American Repertory Theater) in Cambridge. Curves had its Broadway premiere at the James Earl Jones Theater in April 2025, for which Benjamin received a Tony Award nomination for Best Original Score.

== Awards ==
- 2012 BMI Foundation Harrington Award
- 2017 Sundance Institute Residency at the Ucross Foundation
- 2018 Weston Playhouse New Musical Award
- 2018-2019 Dramatists Guild Foundation Fellow
- 2019 Fred Ebb Award
- 2020 Jonathan Larson Award
- 2023 Stephen Schwartz Award
- 2025 Kleban Award
- 2025 Tony Award for Best Original Score Nomination, Drama Desk Award for Outstanding Music Nomination, and an Outer Critics Circle Award Nomination for Real Women Have Curves (musical)
