= New York Sephardic Jewish Film Festival =

Annual film festival in New York City

- Location: New York
- Founded: 1990
- Website: www.nysephardifilmfestival.org

The New York Sephardic Jewish Film Festival (NYSJFF), also known as the Sephardic Film Festival, is an annual New York City film festival sponsored by the American Sephardi Federation. It was founded in 1990. The 20th Anniversary Edition of the festival was from March 30 to April 6, 2017.

The festival showcases films about Jewish communities of the Mediterranean and Asia, including Morocco, Yemen, Ethiopia, Kurdistan, Iran/Persia and India, as well as the Sephardi descendants of the Jews expelled from Spain.

The films are part of a movement towards popular narrative movies and more personal documentaries taking advantage of the freedom given by improvements in video cameras and associated digital hardware to pursue a more personal on-screen vision of what it means to be Jewish.

The 2020 festival was held from February 23 to March 2, 2020.

== See also ==
- New York Film Festival
- New York Jewish Film Festival
