= Surgeons of Hope =

US-based nonprofit organisation

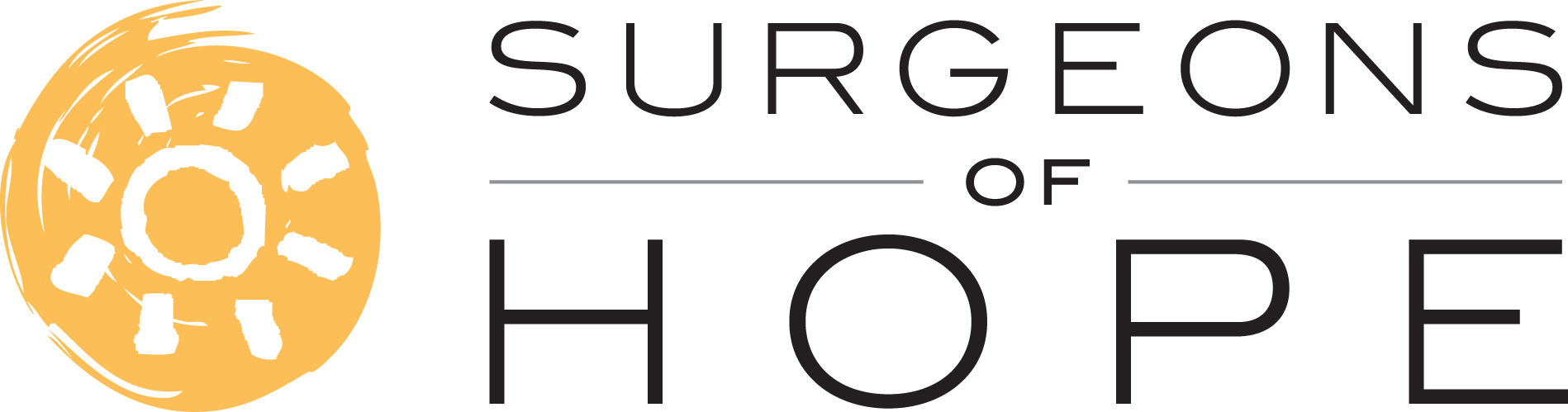
Surgeons Of Hope logo

Surgeons of Hope (SOH) is a New York City-based nonprofit organization established in 2001. It deals with heart defects in children and the related surgery.

== Background ==
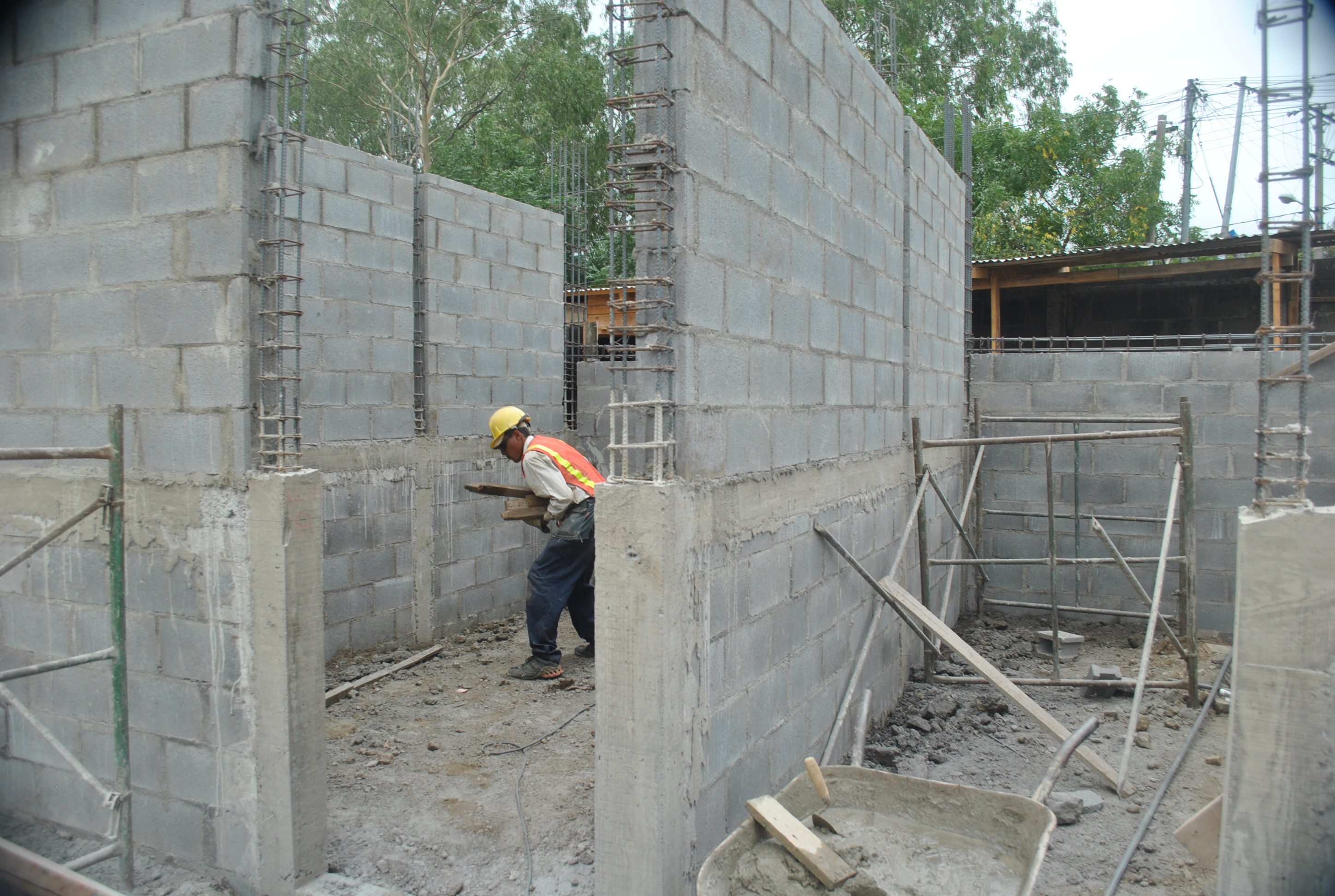
Pediatric Heart Center of Nicaragua in construction

Surgeons of Hope began its work with pilot programs in Cambodia, Mozambique, Senegal, and Afghanistan. In 2008, it shifted focus to efforts in Latin America. In 2013, Surgeons of Hope opened the only pediatric heart center in Nicaragua. As of 2018, Surgeons of Hope has programs in Nicaragua and Costa Rica.
