= Patricia Cardoso =

Colombian-American film director

- Born: 1960 or 1961 (age 65–66); Bogotá, Colombia
- Education: Universidad de los Andes (Colombia) (BA); University of California, Los Angeles (M.F.A.)
- Occupations: Film director; screenwriter; film producer
- Years active: 1989-present

Patricia Cardoso is a Colombian and American filmmaker, screenwriter and producer. She is best known for her 2002 film Real Women Have Curves, which centers around the experiences of a young Mexican-American woman navigating the challenges of family, culture, and body image. The film's lasting impact was recognized in 2019, when it was selected by the Library of Congress for inclusion in the National Film Registry "as a cinematic treasure and worthy of preservation as part of America's patrimony". This honor made Cardoso the first Latin woman director to have a film included in the registry.

Cardoso has also achieved several other notable firsts in her career. She was the first Latin woman director to receive a Sundance Audience Award, which she won for Real Women Have Curves. Additionally, she was the first Latin woman director to receive a Student Academy Award, an achievement she earned for her short film The Water Carrier.

In 2017, Cardoso was invited to join the Academy of Motion Pictures Arts and Sciences in the Directors Branch, and in 2021 she was invited to join the British Film Academy.

Cardoso's directing credits extend beyond the big screen, and include work on several American television shows. In 2018, she was handpicked by Ava DuVernay to direct an episode of her television series Queen Sugar. Additionally, Cardoso has directed episodes for a variety of other television shows, including Will Trent, The Society and Tales of the City on Netflix, All Rise, Emergence, Party of Five, and Diary of a Future President. Her directing credits also include the pilot for Harlan Coben's Shelter on Amazon Prime.

Cardoso is a graduate of UCLA's film school and a Fulbright scholar; her anthropological approach to directing guides her film and television work.

== Early life ==
Cardoso was born and raised in Bogotá, Colombia. As a child, she wrote and illustrated home-made picture-books. Only after she became a film student at UCLA did she realize that these books were story boards. Cardoso's first film was a humorous documentary titled Vacas Flacas y Vacas Gordas (Skinny Cows and Fat Cows) about the famine and feast periods her family endured. Due to the lack of technology in her household, the film was made with toothpicks, paper, and cardboard.

She studied anthropology at Universidad de los Andes in Bogotá, Colombia, and earned a M.F.A in Film and Television Production from UCLA.

== Career ==
At UCLA film school, she was at the top of her class, earning all major directing awards at the school: the Colin Higgins Foundation Award in Film, the Lynn Weston Fellowship in Film, and the Verna Fields Award.

Cardoso's directing credits include episodes of The Society, All Rise, and Tales of the City and the feature Teresa — the largest box office for a woman director in Colombia.

Cardoso was the first Latin woman to win a Sundance Film Festival Dramatic Audience Award and to receive a Student Academy Award for Real Women Have Curves. She was also the first Latin woman to have a film in the Library of Congress National Film Registry.

On the creation of Real Women Have Curves, Cardoso described struggling to find funding for the film with writers Josefina Lopez and George LaVoo—many industry heads citing it as "having no market" despite its compelling script. After the script was picked up, Cardoso was officially hired to direct. She completed the casting process as well as crew assembly herself, conducting one-on-one interviews with potential crew members.

Cardoso attributes her anthropological background to the respect she has for every character in her films, the depth and dimension of her character development, and for the rigorous research she does during pre-production to create reality and truthfulness in her movies.

Cardoso's Real Women Have Curves broke many conventions of traditional Hollywood filmmaking and became a landmark in American independent film. According to Entertainment Weekly, it is "one of the most influential movies of the 2000s", and cast "a wide shadow over the new generation of filmmakers to come". The movie is cited for showing "the impact a movie could have in the culture", and it is acclaimed for its nuanced portrayal of its characters and of Los Angeles.

According to an interview with The Los Angeles Times, Cardoso struggled to find work after the success of Real Women Have Curves. After her work on TV movies throughout the 2000s and 2010s, she caught the attention of filmmaker Ava DuVernay, with whom she directed an episode of DuVernay's television series Queen Sugar in 2016.

In September 2021, Cardoso's Real Women earned the main spot at the Significant Movies and Movie Makers Gallery, held at the Academy Museum of Motion Pictures. Clips and stills from Real Women were the only ones depicted in color. According to Sophia Serrano, assistant curator of the gallery, the museum wanted Real Women to "stand out as the hero of the gallery".

Cardoso also donated the film's script notes, casting calls, storyboards, production stills, location scouting photos and design drawings to the academy's Margaret Herrick Library as part of the Patricia Cardoso Papers, making her work a public resource and allow the curators to resurface various parts of it in future exhibits.

== Personal life ==
Since 2018, Cardoso has been a distinguished professor at UC Riverside, teaching classes in the departments of Theater and Film and Digital Production.

== Filmography ==
=== Film ===
==== Feature film ====
Year	Title	Notes
2002	Real Women Have Curves	
2010	Lies in Plain Sight	TV movie
2012	Meddling Mom	TV movie
2017	El Paseo De Teresa	

==== Short film ====
Year	Title	Notes
1989	Isle of Dreams	
1990	The Air Globes	
1991	Cartas al niño Dios	
1994	The Water Carrier of Cucunuba	
1994	El reino de los cielos	
1996	The Water Carrier	
2011	Deep Blue Breath	
2016	La Clave	

=== Television ===
Year	Title	Notes
2012	Ro	Director, 6 episodes
2018, 2022	Queen Sugar	Director, 3 episodes
2019	All Rise	Director, 1 episode
2019	Emergence	Director, 1 episode
2019	In the Dark	Director, 1 episode
2019	Tales of the City	Director, 1 episode
2019	The Society	Director, 1 episode
2020	Party of Five	Director, 2 episodes
2021	Secrets of Sulphur Springs	Director, 2 episodes
2021	Diary of a Future President	Director, 1 episode
2021	Just Beyond	Director, 1 episode
2023	The Watchful Eye	Director, 1 episode
2023	Harlan Coben's Shelter	Director, 1 episode
2023-2024	Will Trent	Director, 2 episodes

== Awards and honors ==
Year	Award	Festival	Nominated work	Result
1990	Premio Mesquite Best First Work	San Antonio CineFestival	The Air Globes (Cartas al Niño Dios)	Won
1990	Premio Mesquite Best Short Film	San Antonio CineFestival	The Air Globes (Cartas al Niño Dios)	Won
1990	Primer Premio	Concurso Nacional de Cortometrajes	The Air Globes (Cartas al Niño Dios)	Won
1990	Premio Especial del Jurado Hernando Salcedo Silva	Concurso Nacional de Cortometrajes	The Air Globes (Cartas al Niño Dios)	Won
1996	Festival Prize	Black Maria Film and Video Festival	The Water Carrier (El Reino de los Cielos)	Won
1996	Crystal Heart Award	Heartland Film Festival	The Water Carrier (El Reino de los Cielos)	Won
1996	DGA Student Film Award	Student Academy Awards	The Water Carrier (El Reino de los Cielos)	Won
1996	Gold Medal	Student Academy Awards	The Water Carrier (El Reino de los Cielos)	Won
1996	Grand Prize	Angelus Student Film Festival	The Water Carrier (El Reino de los Cielos)	Won
1996	Golden Eagle Award	CINE	The Water Carrier (El Reino de los Cielos)	Won
1996	Premio Mesquite Best Narrative	San Antonio CineFestival	The Water Carrier (El Reino de los Cielos)	Won
1996	UNESCO Igualada Institut Català Award	UNESCO	The Water Carrier (El Reino de los Cielos)	Won
1996	MacArthur Foundation Subtitling Grant	Toronto International Film Festival	The Water Carrier (El Reino de los Cielos)	Won
1996	Ida Lupino Student Award	Directors Guild of America	The Water Carrier (El Reino de los Cielos)	Won
1996	Harry Kurnitz Creative Writing Competition	Dashew Center - UCLA	The Water Carrier (El Reino de los Cielos)	Won
1996	Golden Reel Award	Motion Picture Sound Editors	The Water Carrier (El Reino de los Cielos)	Nominated
2002	Audience Award	Sundance Film Festival	Real Women Have Curves	Won
2002	Grand Jury Prize	Sundance Film Festival	Real Women Have Curves	Nominated
2002	Premio Eroski de la Juventud (Youth Award)	Festival de Cine de San Sebastián	Real Women Have Curves	Won
2002	Humanitas Prize Sundance Feature Film	Humanitas Prize	Real Women Have Curves	Won
2002	Excellence in Filmmaking	National Board of Review	Real Women Have Curves	Won
2002	Silver Plate Audience Choice Award	Chicago International Film Festival	Real Women Have Curves	Won
2002	Excellence in Film Latino Spirit Award	California State Legislature	Real Women Have Curves	Won
2002	Planned Parenthood Award	Planned Parenthood	Real Women Have Curves	Won
2002	California Governor's Commendation	Governor of California	Real Women Have Curves	Won
2011	Best Creative Media Film	Poppy Jasper Film Festival	Deep Blue Breath	Won
2011	Best Young Actor for Clay Beabout	Action on Film International Film Festival	Deep Blue Breath	Won
2011	Best Short Film	Tampa Independent's Film Festival	Deep Blue Breath	Won
2011	NAMIC Vision Award	NAMIC Vision Award	Lies in Plain Sight	Won
2011	Best Actor for Martha Higadera	Imagen Awards	Lies in Plain Sight	Won
2011	Movie of the Year	Lifetime (TV Network)	Lies in Plain Sight	Won
2011	Best Actor for Rosie Perez	NAACP Image Awards	Lies in Plain Sight	Nominated
2013	Best Actor for Sonia Braga	Imagen Awards	Meddling Mom	Nominated
2015	First Place Drama Short	United Latino Film Festival	La Clave	Won
2015	Gold CINDY Award	CINDY Awards	La Clave	Won
2015	CINDY Social Issues Award	CINDY Awards	La Clave	Won
2015	Award of Merit Special Mention	The Best Shorts Competition	La Clave	Won

Cardoso also received:

- Smithsonian Institution Latino Recognition Award
- Reconocimiento Fulbright a la Excelencia
- UCLA Filmmaker Of The Year Honor
- Hubert Bals Fund for Film Production - International Film Festival Rotterdam
- Visionary Award LA Femme Film Festival
- California Governor's Commendation
