= Jon Katz =

American journalist (born 1947)

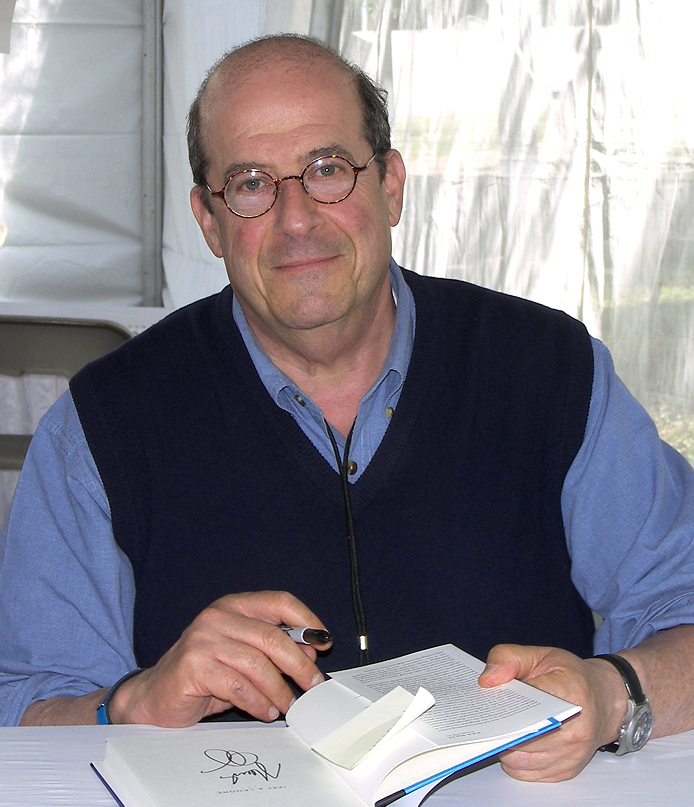
- Born: August 8, 1947 (age 79)
- Occupation: Journalist

Jon Katz (born August 8, 1947) is an American journalist, author, and photographer. He was a contributor to the online magazine HotWired, the technology website Slashdot, and the online news magazine Slate. In his early career as an author he wrote a series of crime novels and books on geek subculture. More recent works focus on the relationship between humans and animals.

== Career ==
=== Journalism ===
Katz initially worked as a reporter for The Philadelphia Inquirer, The Boston Globe and The Washington Post, and later as of the CBS Morning News. His media criticism, columns and book reviews appeared in such periodicals as Rolling Stone and New York (he was a contributing editor to both magazines), Wired, GQ, and The New York Times.

Expressing "disenchantment with the world of old media", he joined the now defunct HotWired, the online version of Wired magazine, to which he contributed articles on technology, culture and the media. In 1998, Katz left HotWired after a redesign, not knowing where he would land next.

He joined Slashdot, where many of his contributions to Slashdot were focused on the youth subculture of geeks and social misfits, for example examining the degree of alienation of the Columbine killers.

Katz's first article for Slate appeared in December 2005 and he has since become a regular contributor to the online magazine. The majority of his writings at Slate revolve around animals and his rural life.

=== Books ===
External videos
- Booknotes interview with Katz on Virtuous Reality, March 23, 1997, C-SPAN
- Washington Journal interview with Katz on Running to the Mountain, March 8, 1999, C-SPAN
- Washington Journal interview with Katz on Geeks: How Two Lost Boys Rode the Internet Out of Idaho, February 25, 2000, C-SPAN

Katz has written several novels as well as non-fiction works which cover topics ranging from geek culture to people's evolving relationship with animals. He wrote a successful series of mystery novels centered around the character Kit DeLeeuw, a former Wall Street financier turned private investigator, based in the fictional Rochambeau, New Jersey. His more recent work explores his own relationship with his dogs (and other animals) on his farm in upstate New York and broader issues of animals' place—both physically and emotionally—in the modern world.

Many of Katz' books have described his relationships with dogs. He began writing about them after taking in a difficult Border Collie, whom Katz credited with changing his life by causing him to take up shepherding and move to a farm. He has written extensively on the way we train dogs, arguing that most approaches fail because they are too inflexible, and because—as dog owners—we over-anthropomorphize our companion animals: "we give them too much credit, make them too complex, muddying our communications" by treating them as "soul mates" rather than understanding and respecting their animal nature. "I can't imagine life without a dog", Katz said in a 2002 interview. "I don't think dogs are substitutes for people, but I must confess I often find them more reliable."

=== Photography ===
Katz began to blog in 2007 and concurrently learned photography, using his photographs to illustrate blog posts. These photos feature portraits (primarily of animals) as well as landscapes and scenic shots taken on his farm and in the surrounding rural areas and small towns of upstate New York. Since shortly after initiating his blog, he began using his own photos as the cover images on all of his books.

== Controversy ==
=== On Slashdot ===
Katz's writing was often criticized by Slashdot readers. Some criticism was leveled at Katz when he posted an article about an e-mail message he purportedly received from a teenager named "Junis" in Afghanistan who had just rejoined the Internet in late 2001. Some Slashdot readers believed the e-mail message to be a hoax or parody designed to fool Katz. According to Katz, Junis wrote his e-mail from "his ancient Commodore computer", which he had "dug up" and was now using to download movies, pornography, and MP3s thanks to the recent liberation of Afghanistan. Because of the unlikelihood of performing these activities on the Commodore 64, some Slashdot readers felt this demonstrated Katz's lack of technical knowledge about computers. An article in the Technology section of The New York Times discussed the Slashdot piece and its criticisms.

=== In the Border Collie community ===
Katz's books about dogs have received favorable reviews in the literary press, but have been met with a hostile reaction in segments of the Border Collie community. Notable examples of this criticism have included Donald McCaig's review of The Dogs of Bedlam Farm in [The Bark] magazine, and Penny Tose's review of Katz on Dogs in The American Border Collie magazine.

=== New York City carriage horses ===
Katz wrote a book on the controversial subject of the New York carriage horses titled Who Speaks for the Carriage Horses: The Future of Animals in Our World in which he supported the continuance of the carriage trade in New York City. The book was published by Roadswell Editions in July 2014.

== Personal life ==
Katz's marriage to Paula Span ended in 2008. He married artist Maria Wulf on their New York farm in 2010. Katz is the father of Brooklyn sportswriter Emma Span.

== Publications ==
=== Kit DeLeeuw series ===
- Death by Station Wagon (1993)
- The Family Stalker (1994)
- The Last Housewife (1995)
- The Father's Club (1996)
- Death Row (1998)

=== Books about dogs ===
- Running to the Mountain: a journey of faith and change (2000)
- A Dog Year: twelve months, four dogs and me (2003)
- The New Work of Dogs: tending to life, love and family (2003)
- The Dogs of Bedlam Farm: an adventure with sixteen sheep, three dogs, two donkeys and me (2004)
- Dog Days: dispatches from Bedlam Farm (2005)
- Katz on Dogs: a commonsense guide to training and living with dogs (2005)
- A Good Dog: the story of Orson who changed my life (2006)
- Izzy and Lenore: two dogs, an unexpected journey, and me (2008)
- Soul of a Dog: reflections on the spirits of the animals at Bedlam Farm (2009)
- Rose in a Storm: A novel (2010)
- Listening to Dogs: How to Be Your Own Training Guru (2012)
- Dancing Dogs: Stories (2012)
- The Story of Rose: A Man and His Dog (2012)
- The Second-Chance Dog: A Love Story (2013)

=== Children's books ===
- Meet the Dogs of Bedlam Farm (2011)
- Lenore Finds a Friend (2013)

=== Other books ===
- Sign Off (1991)
- Virtuous Reality (1997)
- Media Rants: Post Politics in the Digital Nation: A Netizen Takes on Washington and the Media Empire (1997)
- Running to the Mountain: A Midlife Adventure (1999)
- Geeks: How Two Lost Boys Rode the Internet Out of Idaho (2000)
- Out of the Shadows (2009)
- Going Home: Finding Peace When Pets Die (2011)
- Who Speaks for the Carriage Horses: The Future of Animals in Our World (2014)
- Saving Simon: How a Rescue Donkey Taught Me the Meaning of Compassion (2014)
- Talking To Animals: How You Can Understand Animals And They Can Understand You (2017)
- Lessons From Bedlam Farm (Coming 2018)

=== Plays ===
- Last Days at Maple View Farm (2015)

== See also ==
- Slashdot
