= Greatest Hits (Melissa Manchester album) =

Greatest hits album by Melissa Manchester
- Released: January 31, 1983
- Recorded: 1975–1983
- Genre: Pop, ballad, easy listening, dance-pop, new wave
- Length: 44:12
- Label: Arista
- Producer: Arif Mardin, Vini Poncia, Harry Maslin, Steve Buckingham

Melissa Manchester chronology
Hey Ricky (1982)	Greatest Hits (1983)	Emergency (1983)

Singles from Greatest Hits
- 1. "Nice Girls" Released: January 1983; 2. "My Boyfriend's Back" Released: 1983

Greatest Hits is the first compilation album released by American singer Melissa Manchester. It was issued by Arista Records in 1983, shortly after the release of Manchester's biggest hit, the new wave top 10 hit "You Should Hear How She Talks About You".

The compilation spans 10 songs, which cover the years 1975 to 1983, starting with Manchester's first Arista single (and first top 10 hit) "Midnight Blue", from her third album Melissa up to two new songs recorded specifically for this record: "Nice Girls" and a medley of two 60's covers: "My Boyfriend's Back" and "Runaway", both produced by Arif Mardin, who had produced Manchester's previous record Hey Ricky.

While the compilation includes her three Billboard top 10 singles, "Midnight Blue", "Don't Cry Out Loud" and "You Should Hear How She Talks About You", it is fairly incomplete, as it only includes three more songs that became hits for her in the USA, including the Academy Award-nominated 1979 song "Through the Eyes of Love", from the soundtrack of the film Ice Castles, which had not been included on any of Manchester's albums up to that point.

No material from Manchester's Arista albums Help Is On the Way (1976), Singin'... (1977) or For the Working Girl (1980) is included, while her 1979 self-titled album is only represented by the song "Whenever I Call You Friend", a song Manchester co-wrote with Kenny Loggins and became a top 10 hit for him and Stevie Nicks in 1978 (Manchester duets with Arnold McCuller on her version, which was not released as a single). In addition, "Come In From The Rain", a song which Manchester wrote and first recorded in 1976 as an album track but became a hit for Captain & Tennille a year later, is also included, albeit in its 1982 remixed version found on Manchester's album Hey Ricky.

"Nice Girls" and "My Boyfriend's Back" were released as singles, with the former peaking at #42 in the Billboard Hot 100. Both became top 40 hits on the Adult Contemporary chart. The compilation peaked at #43 in the USA, and was a steady seller, eventually being certified gold in 1989 by the RIAA.

A German 1994 reissue added 6 bonus tracks, all of which were released as singles and charted on the Billboard Hot 100, including the 1983 single "No One Can Love You More Than Me", which was released later in the year from Manchester's last Arista album Emergency.

== Track listing ==
No.	Title	Writer(s)	Length
1.	"Don't Cry Out Loud" (from Don't Cry Out Loud, 1978)	Peter Allen; Carole Bayer Sager	3:49
2.	"You Should Hear How She Talks About You" (from Hey Ricky, 1982)	Dean Pitchford; Tom Snow	4:15
3.	"Midnight Blue" (from Melissa, 1975)	Melissa Manchester; Sager	3:55
4.	"Just Too Many People" (from Melissa)	Manchester; Vini Poncia	3:38
5.	"Whenever I Call You Friend" (feat. Arnold McCuller) (from Melissa Manchester, 1979)	Kenny Loggins; Manchester	4:44
6.	"Come In from the Rain" (from Hey Ricky)	Manchester; Sager	4:20
7.	"Nice Girls" (previously unreleased)	Jan Buckingham; Steve Buckingham; Mark Gray	3:40
8.	"Just You and I" (from Better Days & Happy Endings, 1976)	Manchester; Sager	4:06
9.	"My Boyfriend's Back/Runaway (Medley)" (previously unreleased)	Bob Feldman; Jerry Goldstein; Richard Gottehrer; Del Shannon; Max Crook	7:35
10.	"Through the Eyes of Love" (from Ice Castles, 1979)	Marvin Hamlisch; Sager	4:10

German 1994 CD bonus tracks
No.	Title	Writer(s)	Length
11.	"Better Days" (from Better Days & Happy Endings)	Manchester; Sager	4:17
12.	"Rescue Me" (from Better Days & Happy Endings)	Carl Smith; Raynard Miner	3:02
13.	"Fire in the Morning" (from Melissa Manchester)	Gary Harju; Larry Herbstritt; Steve Dorff	3:51
14.	"Pretty Girls" (from Melissa Manchester)	Lisa Dalbello	3:53
15.	"Lovers After All" (feat. Peabo Bryson) (from For the Working Girl, 1980)	Manchester; Leon Ware	4:14
16.	"No One Can Love You More Than Me" (from Emergency, 1983)	Terry Britten; Billy Livsey	4:12

== Charts ==
Chart (1983)	Position
United States (Billboard 200)	43
Australia (Kent Music Report)	98
