= Midnight Blue (Melissa Manchester song) =

Single by Melissa Manchester

from the album Melissa
- B-side: "I Got Eyes"
- Released: April 1975
- Recorded: 1974; Sunset Sound Recorders (Los Angeles), A & R Recording (New York City)
- Genre: Folk rock
- Length: 3:25 (single version) 3:55 (album version)
- Label: Arista
- Songwriters: Melissa Manchester; Carole Bayer Sager
- Producers: Vini Poncia; Richard Perry (exec.)

Melissa Manchester singles chronology
"O Heaven (How You've Changed to Me)" (1974)	"Midnight Blue" (1975)	"Just Too Many People" (1975)

Official music video
- "Midnight Blue" on YouTube

"Midnight Blue" is a song by American singer and songwriter Melissa Manchester, written by herself alongside Carole Bayer Sager and produced by Vini Poncia with an executive production by Richard Perry. It was released in April 1975 as the first single from Manchester's third studio album, Melissa (1975).

The song was described by Billboard magazine as "a classically elegant quiet ballad about a pair of longtime lovers putting aside their current aggravations until the dawn in order to try making it one more time in memory of all their old times together".

In the United States, the single became her first top ten entry on the Billboard Hot 100 chart, peaking at number six. Additionally, it peaked at number one on the Adult Contemporary chart.

== Background ==
The song had been written by Manchester in 1973 as her first collaboration with Carole Bayer Sager, who would be Manchester's regular lyricist over the next five years; Manchester would recall: "the songs that I wrote with Carole... all came out of conversations. Therefore the tone of the songs was very conversational. The listener always feels like they are in the moment when that first line is uttered." According to Manchester the genesis of "Midnight Blue" was a conversation she and Bayer Sager "had about our young husbands, and how as young women we didn't know how to get through the hard times that every relationship has"; the song was essentially finished but still lacking a title when either Manchester or Bayer Sager said: "Midnight Blue" which Manchester opines "was the perfect fit for the [song's] overall feeling".

After meeting Manchester backstage after Bette Midler's Carnegie Hall concert of 23 June 1972 Bayer Sager suggested she and Manchester write a song to cut as a demo, the result being "Midnight Blue".

Although Manchester's first two album releases, Home to Myself and Bright Eyes in respectively 1973 and 1974, would overall feature eight songs she had co-written with Bayer Sager, Manchester herself would not record "Midnight Blue" until 1975. The demo of "Midnight Blue" was submitted by Sager and Manchester to producer Vini Poncia in hopes of having his purported client Dionne Warwick record the song: instead the demo convinced Poncia to record the singer of the demo who was Manchester herself. Poncia waited for almost two years - allowing Manchester to fulfill her obligations to the producers of her two Bell Records albums — before approaching Manchester with regard to producing her.

In the interim Manchester had personally pitched "Midnight Blue" to Dusty Springfield according to Springfield's friend Sue Cameron who recalls Manchester visiting Springfield's Laurel Canyon home and playing Springfield the demo of "Midnight Blue" - Cameron (quote): "She told Melissa no. Melissa leaves the house. I went: 'Are you crazy?'"

An alternate background scenario for Manchester's recording "Midnight Blue" is related by Carole Bayer Sager in her autobiography: according to Bayer Sager she "pretty much stalked" Richard Perry to "get him to listen to our song. Finally after I cornered him at an industry party he agreed to listen to [the] demo [of 'Midnight Blue']." Bayer Sager played the demo for Perry at his Manhattan hotel suite, first telling him: "The girl I wrote the song with is singing here and she wants to record it... and I was hoping if you liked it maybe you'd produce it." Bayer Sager recalls that after hearing the demo Perry told her: "This song could be a big hit. I have a young producer who works for me: Vini Poncia, and I think he could make a really good record with Melissa as the artist. I'd executive produce it." According to Bayer Sager, Perry himself played the completed track of "Midnight Blue" for Arista Records president Clive Davis who greenlit Poncia producing Manchester's album Melissa from which "Midnight Blue" was issued as lead single in May 1975 (the single edit trimmed 29 seconds off the album track's outro).

On the original track listing for the album Melissa the track's title is spelled "Midnite Blue", a spelling which was retained for the track's single release in Australia.

== Personnel ==
- Melissa Manchester - piano, vocals
- Vini Poncia - backing vocals
- David Wolfert - acoustic guitar, electric guitar
- Cooker Lo Presti - bass
- James Newton Howard - electric piano
- Kirk Bruner - drums
- Trevor Lawrence - strings arrangement

== Impact ==
In 2012 Manchester would recall promoting "Midnight Blue": "I [had been] an album artist [with no cause] to worry about a single. Suddenly, Bell Records was absorbed into Arista Records [whose president] Clive Davis...spoke of things like singles success. [For] 'Midnight Blue' we did a really vigorous tour of radio stations and secondary markets" - "I crisscrossed the country to break the song on college radio stations, which were very important at the time. It was right before radio went into automated playlists. Music directors and disc jockeys still had pull. Right after 'Midnight Blue', everything changed" - "We traveled thousands of miles shaking hands and playing: when [the song] finally got from the east coast to the west coast it was so huge...I [will] never forget that first experience of playing the intro to 'Midnight Blue' [to have] people started cheering....That was the power of radio."

"Midnight Blue" debuted at #90 on the Hot 100 in Billboard magazine dated 10 May 1975: the same issue of Billboard showed the track ranked at #22 on the magazine's Easy Listening chart where "Midnight Blue" was in its fourth week on the Easy Listening Top 50. In its sixth week on the Billboard Hot 100, "Midnight Blue" entered the Top 40 at #40 on the chart dated 14 June 1975, with the track ranked at #2 on that week's Billboard Easy Listening chart: "Midnight Blue" would spend the weeks of 21–28 June at #1 on the Billboard Easy Listening chart - eventually being cited as the #1 Easy Listening hit of the year 1975 - while on the Hot 100 the track would ascend to a peak of #6 (8 August 1975).

The first of Manchester's fifteen Hot 100 singles, "Midnight Blue" would be the last song composed by Manchester herself to afford her a Top 20 hit as only the second and third of her seven Top 40 hits were self-penned songs neither of which enjoyed the success level of "Midnight Blue" having respective Hot 100 peaks of #30 ("Just Too Many People") and #27 ("Just You & I"): however Manchester would be returned to the Top Ten twice by "outside material" (see "Don't Cry Out Loud" and "You Should Hear How She Talks About You").

A snippet from Manchester's recording of "Midnight Blue" was one of twelve current or recent hits whose lyrics were "borrowed" to provide responses to a "roving reporter" on the scene of a shark attack played by Dickie Goodman on his novelty hit Mr. Jaws which became a Top Ten hit in the autumn of 1975.

Manchester's "Midnight Blue" was featured on the soundtrack of the 1978 film Ice Castles - for which Manchester sang the theme - and also the 2010 film Dirty Girl in which several of Manchester's songs are heard (Manchester has a cameo in the latter film but not as herself).

In October 2020, a re-envisioned version of "Midnight Blue" was released in support of World Singing Day (3rd Sunday in October). The official music video shows Manchester in a new performance of the song, with a backdrop of images of her stage performances of the song over the years.

== Charts ==
=== Weekly charts ===
Chart (1975)	Peak position
Australia (Kent Music Report)	78
Canada Adult Contemporary (RPM)	1
Canada Top Singles (RPM)	5
US Adult Contemporary (Billboard)	1
US Billboard Hot 100	6
US Cash Box Top Singles	7

=== Year-end charts ===
Chart (1975)	Position
Canada Adult Contemporary (RPM)	12
Canada Top Singles (RPM)	48
US Adult Contemporary (Billboard)	1
US Billboard Hot 100	55
US Cash Box Top Singles	59

== Other versions ==
The song has also been recorded by Wendy Alleyne (Barbados), Shirley Bassey, Johnny Mathis, Arthur Prysock, Vanessa Williams and Viola Wills. An Italian rendering, "E L'Amore Che Muore", was recorded by Wess & Dori Ghezzi for their 1975 album Terzo Album and was issued as a single.

In May 1976, it was recorded and released as a single via LS Records by Cristy Lane. In 1985, a music video was later made for the song.

== See also ==
- List of number-one adult contemporary singles of 1975 (U.S.)
