= Don't Cry Out Loud (Melissa Manchester album) =

1978 album by Melissa Manchester

Studio album by Melissa Manchester
- Released: November 1978
- Recorded: 1977–1978
- Studio: A&M Studios (Hollywood, California); Music Grinder Studios (Hollywood); Allen Zentz Recording (Hollywood); The Village Recorder (Los Angeles, California)
- Genre: Pop; soul; quiet storm
- Length: 36:01
- Label: Arista
- Producer: Leon Ware; Harry Maslin

Melissa Manchester chronology
Singin'... (1977)	Don't Cry Out Loud (1978)	Melissa Manchester (1979)

Singles from Don't Cry Out Loud
- 1. "Don't Cry Out Loud" Released: November 1978; 2. "Through the Eyes of Love" Released: April 1979

Professional ratings
Review scores
Source	Rating
allmusic	4.5/5 stars

Don't Cry Out Loud is the seventh studio album by Melissa Manchester. It was released by Arista Records in October 1978.

== Background ==
Most of the album's tracks were recorded with Leon Ware producing; Ware had expressed an interest in recording Manchester based on the singer's version of the Ware composition "I Wanna Be Where You Are" featured on the 1977 album release Singin'.... The tracks Manchester recorded with Ware intended as the singer's 1978 album release - which Manchester planned to name Caravan - were all original material except "Bad Weather", a Stevie Wonder composition which had been a single for The Supremes in 1973.

According to Arista president Clive Davis upon hearing the Caravan tracks he felt the album as planned would not afford Manchester the Top 40 hit required to revive her career and at Davis' strong suggestion Manchester recorded the Peter Allen and Carole Bayer Sager composition "Don't Cry Out Loud" with Harry Maslin producing. Manchester has stated that in fact the idea of recording "Don't Cry Out Loud" was her own, although she had anticipated recording it in the intimate manner evinced by its writer Peter Allen on his recorded version, and was surprised by the bombastic arrangement used for her recording. However, she also did not like the fact that this song title began with ‘Don’t’ which contradicts her prior songwriting about affirmation. Signing it as a lullaby would not be as complimentary to the lyric as it did with Bowie producer Harry Maslin which made it a success. She now calls it a gift. The addition of the new track "Don't Cry Out Loud" to the album necessitated the dropping of the track "We Had This Time" an apparently one-off songwriting collaboration of Manchester and Larry Weiss - which was utilized as the B-side of the "Don't Cry Out Loud" single: "We Had This Time" would also be recorded by Dionne Warwick for her 1980 album No Night So Long.

With the addition of the "Don't Cry Out Loud" track, Manchester's album was released in October 1978 with "Don't Cry Out Loud" issued as a single; the album was renamed for the single despite Manchester's desire to retain the title Caravan. "Don't Cry Out Loud" did indeed return Manchester to the Top 40 in fact attaining a #10 peak in March 1979 in its twentieth week on the Billboard Hot 100; the single's popularity was paralleled by the ascent of the Don't Cry Out Loud album to #33.

Rather than release a second A-side single from the Don't Cry Out Loud album, Arista attempted to follow up the success of the "Don't Cry Out Loud" single with "Through the Eyes of Love", the theme song from the movie Ice Castles; the track, for which "Such a Morning" from the Don't Cry Out Loud album served as B-side, failed to consolidate Manchester's comeback, peaking at #76. "Through the Eyes of Love" would be included as a bonus track on the CD re-release of the Don't Cry Out Loud album, as would the B-side of the "Don't Cry Out Loud" single: "We Had This Time".

== Track listing ==
Original LP release
No.	Title	Writer(s)	Note(s)	Length
1.	"Shine Like You Should"	Melissa Manchester		3:13
2.	"Caravan"	Melissa Manchester		3:42
3.	"Don't Cry Out Loud"	Peter Allen; Carole Bayer Sager		3:50
4.	"Almost Everything"	Manchester; Leon Ware		2:44
5.	"Bad Weather"	Ira Tucker Jr; Stevie Wonder		3:20
6.	"Through the Eyes of Grace"	Melissa Manchester		4:01
7.	"To Make You Smile Again"	Manchester; Sager	this song was re-recorded in 1989 for her album Tribute	4:51
8.	"Such a Morning"	Manchester; Steve Cagan		2:51
9.	"Knowing My Love's Alive"	Manchester; Ware		4:00
10.	"Singin' from My Soul"	Manchester; Adrienne Anderson	this song originally appeared on Help Is On The Way (1976); this version of the track has an added lyric with different arrangements	3:29

2002 CD reissue bonus track
No.	Title	Writer(s)	Note(s)	Length
11.	"We Had This Time"	Manchester; Larry Weiss	Dionne Warwick also recorded this song for her album No Night So Long (1980)	4:40

2007 Wounded Bird CD reissue
No.	Title	Writer(s)	Note(s)	Length
11.	"Through the Eyes of Love" (single mix)	Marvin Hamlisch; Sager	theme from the motion picture Ice Castles	3:42
12.	"My Boyfriend's Back/Runaway" (Medley)	Bob Feldman; Jerry Goldstein; Richard Gottehrer; Del Shannon; Max Crook	from Manchester's 1983 Greatest Hits album	7:11

== Charts ==
Chart (1978/79)	Position
United States (Billboard 200)	33
Australia (Kent Music Report)	75

== Personnel ==
Musicians and vocalists

- Melissa Manchester – vocals, acoustic piano (2, 6, 10)
- Greg Phillinganes – electric piano (1, 2, 4, 5, 7–10)
- Richard Tee – acoustic piano (1, 4, 5, 7, 9, 10)
- Bill Payne – acoustic piano (3)
- Michael Boddicker – synthesizers (5), sound string equalizer (8)
- Reginald "Sonny" Burke – synthesizers (5)
- David T. Walker – electric guitar (1, 2, 4, 5, 7, 9, 10)
- Lee Ritenour – guitars (2–5, 8, 9)
- Dennis Budimir – guitars (3)
- Jay Graydon – guitars (10)
- Chuck Rainey – bass guitar (1, 2, 4, 5, 7–10)
- David Hungate – bass guitar (3)
- James Gadson – drums (1, 2, 4, 5, 7, 9), electronic drums (1, 2), backing vocals (9)
- Jim Keltner – drums (3)
- Art Rodriguez – drums (8), electronic drums (8)
- Ed Greene – drums (10)
- Lenny Castro – percussion (1, 2, 4, 7–10), birds (8)
- Tommy Morgan – harmonica (7)
- Tom Saviano – alto saxophone (5), tenor saxophone (5)
- David Luell – baritone saxophone (5), tenor saxophone (5)
- Mike Carnahan – tenor saxophone (5)
- Dick Hyde – trombone (5)
- Lew McCreary – trombone (5)
- Chuck Findley – trumpet (5)
- Steve Madaio – trumpet (5)
- Frank DeCaro – orchestra manager (1–4, 6, 7, 10)
- Harry Bluestone – concertmaster (1–4, 6, 7, 10), violin solo (2)
- Leon Ware – backing vocals (1, 2, 5, 9)
- Claudia Cagan – backing vocals (5)

Music arrangements

- Tom Saviano – horn arrangements (1, 4, 5), rhythm arrangements (1, 2, 4, 7, 8, 10)
- Gene Page – string arrangements (1, 4, 7, 10)
- David Blumberg – string arrangements (2, 6, 9), rhythm arrangements (9), woodwind arrangements (9)
- Barry Fasman – arrangements (3)
- Leon Ware – rhythm arrangements (7, 9)

=== Production ===
- Leon Ware – producer (1, 2, 4–10)
- Harry Maslin – producer (3), engineer (3)
- Milt Calise – engineer (1, 2, 4, 5, 7–10)
- Gary Starr – engineer (1, 2, 4, 5, 7–10)
- Steve Waldman – engineer (3)
- Gary Skardina – engineer (6)
- Carla Frederick – second engineer (1, 2, 4, 5, 7–10)
- Chuck Travers – second engineer (1, 2, 4, 5, 7–10)
- Nick Van Maarth – second engineer (1, 2, 4, 5, 7–10)
- Rick Ash – second engineer (3)
- Steve Conger – second engineer (3)
- Robert Feist – second engineer (6)
- Phil Schier – mixing
- Ron Alvaro – second mix engineer
- Jackson Schwartz – second mix engineer
- Jo Hansch – editing, mastering
- Record Plant (Los Angeles, California) – mixing location
- Kendun Recorders (Burbank, California) – mixing, editing and mastering location
- Pam Bishop – production coordinator, tour manager
- Marsha Kleinbak – production coordinating assistant
- Carol Cassano – musical coordinator
- Kay Steele – cover coordinator
- John Kosh – art direction, design
- David Alexander – photography
- Larry Brezner, Jack Rollins and Charles H. Joffe – personal management
