= Through the Eyes of Love =

Single by Melissa Manchester

from the album Ice Castles: Original Motion Picture Soundtrack
- B-side: "Such a Morning"
- Released: 1979
- Recorded: 1978
- Genre: Pop
- Length: 4:12 (album version), 3:32 (single mix)
- Label: Arista
- Songwriter(s): Marvin Hamlisch, Carole Bayer Sager
- Producer(s): Arif Mardin

Melissa Manchester singles chronology
"Don't Cry Out Loud" (1978)	"Through the Eyes of Love" (1979)	"Pretty Girls" (1979)

"Through the Eyes of Love (Theme from Ice Castles)" (sometimes incorrectly referred to as "Looking Through the Eyes of Love"), is an Academy Award and Golden Globe Award-nominated ballad performed by American singer Melissa Manchester, from the soundtrack of the 1978 film Ice Castles.

== Details ==
"Through the Eyes of Love" is featured during the climax of the film, as the song Lexie Winston (played by Lynn-Holly Johnson) skates to it in the first competition after she has become blind due to a skating accident. Lexie skates to the instrumental version, while the vocal version is played over the end credits. The lyrics refer to the recovery of the will to fulfill her dreams helped by her boyfriend Nick Peterson (played by Robby Benson) and how, despite her blindness, she's able to overcome her troubles looking "through the eyes of love".

The music of the song was written by the film's composer, Marvin Hamlisch, with the lyrics written by Carole Bayer Sager. Melissa Manchester, a frequent collaborator with Sager, was chosen to sing the song. The song was produced by Arif Mardin, with whom Manchester would re-team in 1982 to produce her comeback album Hey Ricky, that produced the biggest hit of her career "You Should Hear How She Talks About You".

Despite not being a big hit, it is considered a classic among Manchester fans for her vocal delivery and has achieved a cult following over the years. It has been a frequent opening song at weddings, especially in the early 1980s. Manchester has usually included the song on her live shows.

== Release and reception ==
Clive Davis, head of Arista Records, decided to make "Through the Eyes Of Love" the follow-up to Manchester's March 1979 top 10 hit "Don't Cry Out Loud" instead of another song from the album of the same name. Released in April 1979, the song climbed high on the Adult Contemporary charts, peaking at number 13, also making a minor showing on the pop charts, peaking at number 76 on the Billboard Hot 100.

The single mix runs at a shorter length than the album version, and features a short guitar solo near the end of the song which is not present on the album version. The song "Such A Morning", from Don't Cry Out Loud, was issued as the B-side on the single.

== Awards ==
The song was nominated for the Academy Award for Best Original Song at the 52nd Academy Awards and the Golden Globe Award for Best Original Song at the 37th Golden Globe Awards during the 1980 awards season, but lost both times, losing to "It Goes Like It Goes" from Norma Rae and "The Rose" from The Rose, respectively.

At the 1980 Academy Awards ceremony, Manchester performed two nominated songs on the same night, the other being "I'll Never Say Goodbye", which she sang for the film The Promise.

== Availability ==
The song was not on any of Manchester's studio albums, but was included on her first Greatest Hits album in 1983 and on many of her subsequent compilations since. A single mix was released for the first time on CD as a bonus track on the Wounded Bird reissue of Manchester's Don't Cry Out Loud album, in 2007.

== Track listing ==
US 7" Single

1. "Theme from Ice Castles (Through the Eyes of Love) (Single Mix) 3:32
2. "Such a Morning" 2:42

European 7" Single

1. "Theme from Ice Castles (Through the Eyes of Love) (Album Version) 4:12
2. "Such a Morning" 2:42

Spanish 7" Single

1. "Theme from Ice Castles (Through the Eyes of Love) (Album Version) 4:12
2. "Theme from Ice Castles (Through the Eyes of Love) (Instrumental) 3:34

Argentinian 7" Single

1. "Theme from Ice Castles (Through the Eyes of Love) (Album Version) 4:12
2. "No One's Ever Seen This Side of Me" 3:13

== Charts ==
Chart (1979)	Peak position
US Billboard Hot 100	76
US Billboard Adult Contemporary	13
Canadian Singles Chart	89

== Covers ==
- In 1999, singer, actor and politician Marco Sison released a cover of this song on his album Memories.
- In the 2010 remake of Ice Castles, a version by artist Britt Nicole is heard several times.
