= Dreams (Diana DeGarmo song) =

2004 single by Diana DeGarmo

Single by Diana DeGarmo
- B-side: "Don't Cry Out Loud"; "I Believe"
- Released: June 22, 2004
- Recorded: 2004
- Studio: Woodland Ranch (Woodland Hills, California); The Location (Stockholm, Sweden); Ocean Way Recording, The Record Plant (Hollywood, California); Royaltone (North Hollywood, California); Mix This! (Pacific Palisades, California)
- Label: RCA; 19; S
- Songwriters: Desmond Child; Andreas Carlsson; Chris Braide
- Producers: Desmond Child; Andreas Carlsson

Diana DeGarmo singles chronology
"Dreams" (2004)	"Emotional" (2004)

Audio
- "Dreams" on YouTube

"Dreams" is a song by American Idol season three runner-up Diana DeGarmo, released as her debut single on June 22, 2004. The song peaked at number 14 on the US Billboard Hot 100 and number two on the Canadian Singles Chart, giving DeGarmo her only and highest-charting single. The B-sides includes a cover of "Don't Cry Out Loud" and her rendition of the season-three finalist song "I Believe".

== Credits and personnel ==
Credits are lifted from the US CD single.

Studios

- Recorded at Woodland Ranch Studios (Woodland Hills, California), The Location (Stockholm, Sweden), Ocean Way Recording, The Record Plant (Hollywood, California), Royaltone Studios (North Hollywood, California), and Mix This! (Pacific Palisades, California)
- Mixed at Mix This! (Pacific Palisades, California)

Writing and production

- Desmond Child – writing, choir, production
- Andreas Carlsson – writing, choir, choir arrangement, production
- Chris Braide – writing, choir
- Brian Coleman – production management
- Jules Gondar – recording
- Rob Jacobs – recording
- Kalle Engström – keyboards and programming, recording, Pro Tools engineering
- Carl Falk – keyboards and programming, recording, Pro Tools engineering
- Matt Gruber – recording
- Richard Hwang – recording
- Bob Clearmountain – recording, mixing
- Steve Churchyard – recording (strings)
- Kevin Harp – mix engineering assistance, engineering assistance
- Anthony Kilhoffer – engineering assistance
- Mike Eleopoulos – engineering assistance
- Greg Burns – engineering assistance
- Curt Kroeger – engineering assistance
- Michael Segal – photography

Vocals

- Diana DeGarmo – lead vocals
- Chris Willis – choir, choir arrangement
- William Champlin – choir
- Shelea Frazier – choir
- Jim Gilstrap – choir
- Lori Perry – choir
- Oren Waters – choir
- Kevin Dorsey – choir

Orchestra

- Dean Parks – acoustic guitars
- Tim Pierce – electric guitars
- Paul Bushnell – bass
- Matt Rollings – piano
- Evan Wilson – viola
- Bob Becker – viola
- Larry Corbett – cello
- Armen Garabedian – cello
- Joe Meyer – French horn
- Brad Warnaar – French horn
- Bob Zimmitti – timpani
- David Campbell – arrangement, conducting (strings, horns, timpani)
- Suzie Katayama – string contracting
- Bettie Ross-Blumer – copyist

== Charts ==
Chart (2004)	Peak position
Canada (Nielsen SoundScan)	2
US Billboard Hot 100	14
