= Ice Castles (2010 film) =

- Official DVD cover
- Directed by: Donald Wrye
- Screenplay by: Donald Wrye; Gary L. Baim; Karen Bloch Morse
- Based on: Ice Castles by Donald Wrye; Gary L. Baum
- Produced by: Michael Mahoney
- Starring: Taylor Firth; Rob Mayes; Morgan Kelly; Tattiawna Jones; Eve Crawford; Henry Czerny
- Cinematography: Eric Cayla
- Edited by: Robert A. Ferretti
- Music by: David C. Williams (Note: Original themes composed by Marvin Hamlisch.)
- Production companies: Stage 6 Films; Jaffe / Braunstein Entertainment
- Distributed by: Sony Pictures Home Entertainment
- Release date: February 9, 2010
- Running time: 95 minutes
- Countries: United States; Canada
- Language: English

Ice Castles is a 2010 American sports romantic drama film directed by Donald Wrye and starring Taylor Firth, Rob Mayes and Henry Czerny. It is a remake of the 1978 film of the same name, which was also directed by Wrye.

The film was released on DVD on February 9, 2010, by Sony Pictures Home Entertainment, shortly before the 2010 Winter Olympics.

== Plot ==
Lexi Winston lives on an Iowa farm with her father Marcus Winston. She has a boyfriend named Nick Peterson who plays hockey in college. Lexi's skating talent attracts the attention of Aiden Reynolds, a coach who wants to take her to Boston and train her to win championships. Lexi works hard and comes in second in regionals, but she misses Nick. However, Aiden considers Nick a distraction and won't even let her mention him to the press. In sectionals, Lexi wins the competition and is ready to go the nationals, but she takes a break from an event where she is supposed to meet with those who can further her career, going outside to just skate for fun. She falls and hits her head, which causes her to go blind. Miracles do happen, she is told, but this is her life for now. Nick has quit the hockey team because the professional teams are not interested in him, and comes back to Iowa to spend time with Lexi. Lexi's condition is kept secret from the public, and while she doesn't believe she will skate again, Marcus and Nick have to urge her just to get out of bed. Eventually, Lexi is willing to try skating again. After some training, she is actually capable of competing again, and she goes to the national competition, with the public unaware she is blind.

== Cast ==
- Taylor Firth as Alexis "Lexi" Winston
- Rob Mayes as Nick Peterson
- Henry Czerny as Marcus Winston
- Morgan Kelly as Aiden Reynolds
- Tattiawna Jones as Melissa
- Eve Crawford as Jane Winston
- Molly Oberstar as Carrie Turner
- Nancy Regan as Regionals Commentator
- Andrea Joyce as Rink Reporter
- Michelle Kwan as National Rinks Commentator #1
- Sandra Bezic as National Rinks Commentator #2

== Production ==
Taylor Firth, who had no prior acting experience, earned her role when she impressed executives at Sony Pictures after they saw a 2007 YouTube video of her ice skating.

The film was shot in Halifax, Nova Scotia.

Notable figure skaters Sandra Bezic (who also appears in the film) and David Wilson served as choreographers for the skating scenes.

Lynn-Holly Johnson, who played Lexie in the original movie, filmed a cameo in the remake, but her scene was cut.
