= Dirty Girl (2010 film) =

Film by Abe Sylvia

- Theatrical release poster
- Directed by: Abe Sylvia
- Written by: Abe Sylvia
- Produced by: Rob Paris; Jana Edelbaum; Rachel Cohen
- Starring: Juno Temple; Milla Jovovich; William H. Macy; Mary Steenburgen; Dwight Yoakam; Jeremy Dozier
- Cinematography: Steve Gainer
- Edited by: Jonathan Lucas
- Music by: Jeff Toyne
- Production companies: iDeal Partners; Hart/Lunsford Pictures; Cherry Sky Films; The Salt Company; Paris Films
- Distributed by: The Weinstein Company
- Release dates: September 12, 2010 (TIFF); October 7, 2011 (United States)
- Running time: 90 minutes
- Country: United States
- Language: English
- Budget: $4 million
- Box office: $143,485

Dirty Girl is a 2010 American coming-of-age comedy-drama film written and directed by Abe Sylvia. It stars Juno Temple, Milla Jovovich, William H. Macy, Mary Steenburgen, Dwight Yoakam, and Jeremy Dozier. The film premiered at the Toronto International Film Festival on September 12, 2010, and received a limited theatrical release in the United States on October 7, 2011, by The Weinstein Company.

== Plot ==
In 1987 in suburban Oklahoma City, Danielle Edmondston is a troubled and promiscuous high school student. She argues with her mother, Sue-Ann, who is about to marry a Mormon, Ray, and feels out of place in her very conservative small suburban town. Amidst the chaos, she befriends Clarke Walters, a shy, (closeted) gay classmate. Together, they flee in a car owned by Clarke's hyper-homophobic father, Joseph, and embark on a road trip to Fresno, California, where Danielle expects to find her birth father, Danny Briggs. Meanwhile, Sue-Ann and Clarke's mother, Peggy, chase after them.

Joseph breaks into Danielle's house in an attempt to find Clarke, only to find that the entire family has gone on vacation. Joseph is then arrested for breaking into the house. He calls Peggy to bail him out, but Peggy refuses to let him out and insists that she will no longer allow him to harm Clarke for being gay. Joseph, aggravated, has to stay in the cell until a judge can see him.

On the way, Danielle and Clarke pick up a beguiling Vegas-bound hitchhiker named Joel, who after they stop for rest, has sex with Clarke. Clarke awakens the next morning to find that Joel is gone, leaving him heartbroken. Clarke blames Danielle Joel's untimely departure. After seemingly moving on and returning to the car, it breaks down on the side of the road leaving Clarke and Danielle to continue on foot, trying to rent a car, only to find Joseph has been released from prison and has reported their credit card stolen. Desperate for money, the two enter a bar and Danielle enters a stripping contest. After she is booed profusely, Clarke derives that it is actually a biker gay bar rather than a straight bar, and Danielle suggests that he strip to win a cash prize instead.

Clarke is acclaimed as he dances, but is caught by Joseph who enters; interrupting his performance. Danielle collects the prize money, but they are both taken in Joseph's other car. While traveling, through an excessive usage of perverted gay slurs, Clarke provokes his father into pulling the car over and while attacking him, Clarke yells for Danielle to flee. Danielle complies and manages to make it to a bus station, visibly upset having had to leave Clarke behind. Arriving to California, she locates her father's house, where upon knocking on the front door she is met by her mother, who asks her to leave. After a kerfuffle, Danielle finally manages to make it to her father, who kindly rejects her and they are interrupted by his young daughter.

Despondent and nostalgic for the childhood that she missed out on, Danielle exits frantically and returns home with her mother. Time elapses and she visits Clarke's mother, who tells her that Clarke's father has sent him to military school and he, himself, has moved into an apartment. Danielle enters the talent show and sings "Don't Cry Out Loud" by Melissa Manchester, who is Clarke's favorite singer. As she breaks down singing, Clarke enters dressed in a military uniform. They finish the song together and get into Danielle's car. Clarke reveals that his mother let him out early and that, in an all-boys school, he became very popular, with some sexual implications, at the same school Clarke also learned how to better defend himself against his abusive father, whom his mother finally decided to divorce after getting fed up with his cruel and controlling behavior. Danielle, with a less rebellious attitude, and Clarke, now no longer afraid to be himself, drive off into the sunset.

== Cast ==
- Milla Jovovich as Sue-Ann Edmondston, Danielle's mother
- Juno Temple as Danielle Edmondston, a promiscuous 16-year-old girl
- Jeremy Dozier as Clarke Walters, a chubby, gay 15-year-old boy
- William H. Macy as Ray, Sue-Ann's fiancée
- Mary Steenburgen as Peggy Walters, Clarke's mother
- Dwight Yoakam as Joseph Walters, Clarke's father
- Nicholas D'Agosto as Joel, a male stripper
- Tim McGraw as Danny Briggs, Danielle's father
- Jack Kehler as Doc Shelby
- Deborah Theaker as Mrs. Hatcher
- Jonathan Slavin as Mr. Potter
- Pat Healy as Billy
- Nate Hartley as Charlie
- Gary Grubbs as Principal Mulray
- Reiley McClendon as Mike
- Brent Briscoe as Officer Perry
- Maeve Quinlan as Janet, Danny's wife
- Elsie Fisher as Tiffany Briggs, Danny and Janet's daughter
- Brian Baumgartner as the concierge (uncredited)

== Production ==
Abe Sylvia developed the story in 2004 while attending UCLA. Sylvia describes it as a fictional account of "growing up in the 1980s" that draws upon some of his adolescent experiences in Oklahoma.

Sally Hawkins and Lisa Kudrow were originally cast in November 2009. Milla Jovovich subsequently replaced Hawkins in the role of Sue-Ann, and Mary Steenburgen replaced Kudrow in the role of Peggy.

Filming began in Southern California, in 2010 and was completed in Los Angeles in May 2010.

== Reception ==
The film grossed $143,485 worldwide against an estimated budget of $4 million.

Dirty Girl received mostly negative critical reviews. On the review aggregator website Rotten Tomatoes, the film holds an approval rating of 35% based on 40 reviews, with an average rating of 5/10. Metacritic, which uses a weighted average, assigned the film a score of 37 out of 100, based on 13 critics, indicating "generally unfavorable" reviews.

In The New York Times, A. O. Scott declared that he found himself cheering not for the main characters on their road trip, but for the actors Temple and Dozier who were doing their best to salvage a chaotic script that "has far less insight, and much less panache, than a randomly chosen episode of Glee."
