= Melissa Manchester =

American singer-songwriter and actress (born 1951)

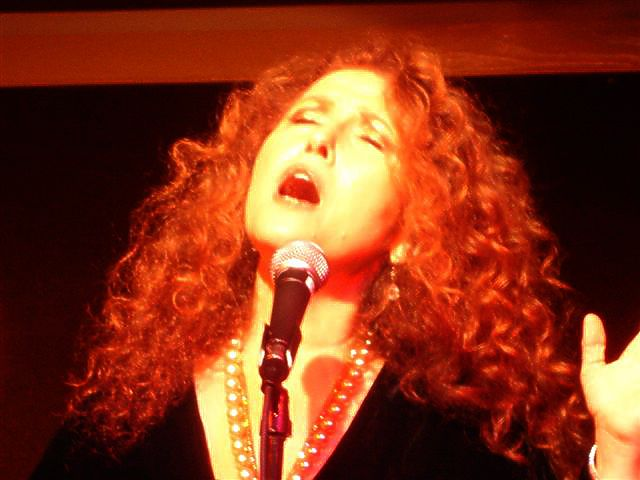
- Manchester in concert (2009)

Background information
- Born: February 15, 1951 (age 75); The Bronx, New York City, US
- Genres: R&B; pop; blue-eyed soul
- Occupations: Singer; songwriter; actress
- Instruments: Vocals; piano
- Years active: 1971–present
- Labels: Arista; Bell
- Website: melissamanchester.com

Melissa Manchester (born February 15, 1951) is an American singer-songwriter and actress. During the 1970s and 1980s, her music found widespread success and popularity, particularly in the adult contemporary market. Throughout her career, she has written many of her own songs, most notably her first mainstream hit single, 1975's "Midnight Blue". She is also well-known for her song "Come In from the Rain", her rendition of "Don't Cry Out Loud", and the Academy Award-nominated "Through the Eyes of Love". Her most successful song on the music charts is 1982's "You Should Hear How She Talks About You", landing at No. 5 on the Billboard Hot 100. She has also gone on to appear on television, in films, and on stage.

== Early life and career ==
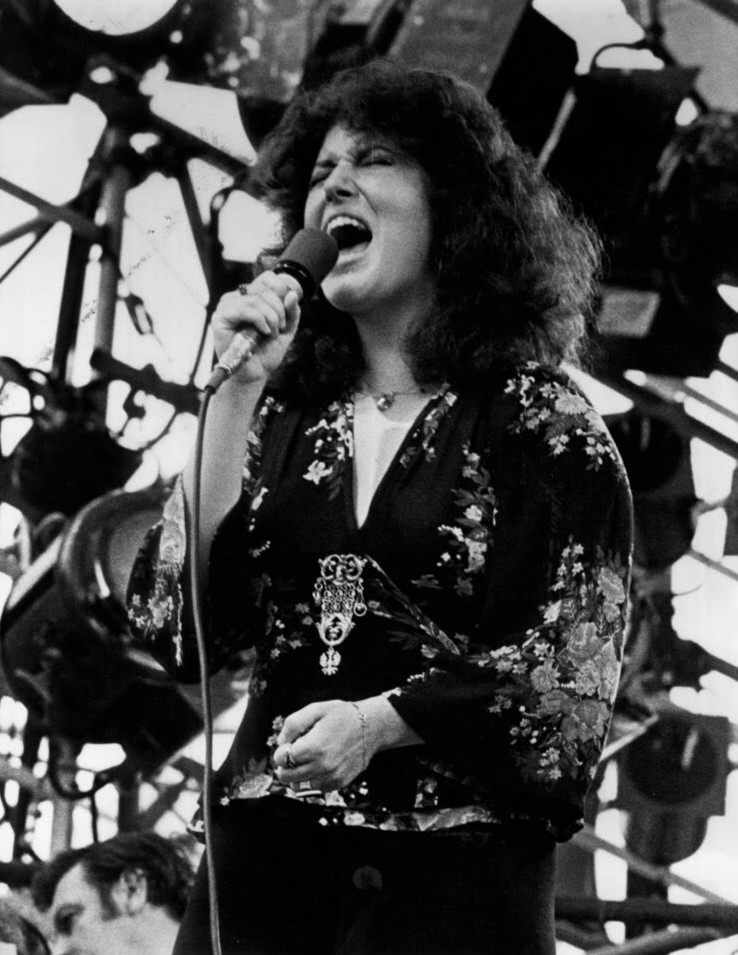
Melissa Manchester, 1973

Manchester was born on February 15, 1951, in the Bronx, to a musical family. Her father, David Manchester, was a bassoonist for the New York Metropolitan Opera for three decades. Her mother was one of the first women to design and found her own clothing firm, Ruth Manchester Ltd. The Manchesters are of Jewish origin.

Manchester started a singing career at an early age. She learned the piano and harpsichord at the Manhattan School of Music, began singing commercial jingles at age 15, and became a staff writer at age 17 for Chappell Music while attending Manhattan's High School of Performing Arts.

She studied songwriting at New York University with Paul Simon when she was 19. Manchester played the Manhattan club scene, where Barry Manilow, a friend and fellow singer of jingles, introduced her to Bette Midler. In 1971, she became a member of the Harlettes, the back-up singers for Midler, which she co-created with Manilow.

Manchester made a brief speaking appearance as "Yoko Ono" on the 1972 album National Lampoon Radio Dinner, on the track titled "Magical Misery Tour", and as the singer in "Deteriorata".

== Solo career ==
Manchester's debut album, Home to Myself, was released in 1973; Manchester co-wrote many of its songs with Carole Bayer Sager. Two years later, her album Melissa produced her first top-ten hit, "Midnight Blue", which enjoyed 17 weeks on the Billboard Hot 100 charts. The song's peak position was No. 6 for the week of August 9, 1975.

In 1974, she performed the songs "O Heaven" and "Home to Myself" on the pilot episode of Ms. magazine's television show, Woman Alive!, a feminist program. She performed the song live on Burt Sugarman's television series Midnight Special in 1973.

In 1976, Manchester released her album Better Days & Happy Endings, which included the song "Come in From the Rain". While it was never released as a single, the song became popular and has since been covered by several other artists including Captain & Tennille, Rosemary Clooney, Vic Damone, Eydie Gormé, Shirley Horn, Cleo Laine, Peggy Lee, Carmen McRae, Jane Olivor, Liza Minnelli, Barbara Cook, Mel Tormé, and Diana Ross.

Manchester appeared with Richie Havens, Melanie, and Frankie Valli as a contributor and performer in the 1977 NBC special documentary How the Beatles Changed the World. Manchester collaborated with Kenny Loggins to co-write Loggins' 1978 hit duet with Stevie Nicks, "Whenever I Call You 'Friend'". She later recorded this for her 1979 Melissa Manchester album. She guest-starred on the CBS-TV daytime soap opera Search for Tomorrow to teach a main character (played by Michael Nouri), who played a singer-songwriter, the essentials of the craft. In 1979, Manchester reached No. 10 with her version of Peter Allen's "Don't Cry Out Loud", for which she received a Grammy nomination for Best Pop Female Vocal Performance.

In 1979, she performed two nominated songs on the 52nd Academy Awards show: "I'll Never Say Goodbye" (from The Promise) and "Through the Eyes of Love" (theme song from Ice Castles). The winning song that year was "It Goes Like It Goes" from Norma Rae.

In 1980, she appeared on The Muppet Show.

In 1982, she released the smash "You Should Hear How She Talks About You", which won the 1983 Grammy for Best Pop Female Vocal Performance, beating out Linda Ronstadt, Olivia Newton-John, Juice Newton, and Laura Branigan. The song itself reached No. 4 on Cash Box and No. 5 on the Billboard Hot 100 chart as well as No. 10 on the Adult Contemporary chart.

In 1985, she signed with MCA Records and released the album Ma+hematics.

Manchester continued to place singles on the Adult Contemporary charts throughout the 1980s. Another Top 10 entry on the AC chart was a 1989 updating of Dionne Warwick's "Walk on By". The single was pulled from her Mika/Polygram album Tribute, which honored some of the singers that influenced her style. In 1992 she sang the title song for the animated musical Little Nemo: Adventures in Slumberland, written by the Sherman Brothers and accompanied by the London Symphony Orchestra.

In 1995, she released the album If My Heart Had Wings on Atlantic Records.

She appeared as herself during a two-day guest appearance on the ABC-TV daytime drama General Hospital to sing the song for Robin Scorpio and her AIDS-afflicted boyfriend Stone Cates.

Throughout the 1980s and 1990s, Manchester alternated recording with acting, appearing with Bette Midler in the film For the Boys, on the television series Blossom, and co-writing (with bookwriter-lyricist Jeffrey Sweet) and starring in the musical I Sent a Letter to My Love based on the Bernice Rubens novel of the same name. In 1990, Manchester could be heard performing "I Wish I Knew", played over the opening credits of the CBS television drama The Trials of Rosie O'Neill. In addition, she opened Game 6 of the 1991 World Series singing the U.S. National Anthem.

== Later career to present ==
Manchester composed and recorded the soundtrack to the direct-to-video Lady and the Tramp II: Scamp's Adventure (2001).

In 2004, Manchester returned with her first album in nine years, When I Look Down That Road. While touring to support the album, she was praised for her still "powerful voice" and for "reinventing [herself] while staying true to what made [her] popular."

In April 2007, she returned to theater, starring in the Chicago production of HATS! The Musical, a show to which she and Sharon Vaughn contributed two songs. Also in 2007, she recorded a duet cover with Barry Manilow of the Carole King classic "You've Got a Friend" on Manilow's The Greatest Songs of the Seventies. In 2008, Manchester released a new single, "The Power of Ribbons", to digital retailers. Proceeds from the single benefit breast cancer research.

In 2011, an independent film named Dirty Girl was released with many of Manchester's songs used throughout the film, five of which made it onto the soundtrack. Manchester made a non-speaking cameo appearance as the pianist who accompanies the lead character's rendition of "Don't Cry Out Loud".

In 2013, Manchester announced that she was recording her 20th studio album, You Gotta Love the Life, her first since When I Look Down That Road. She subsequently launched an Indiegogo campaign to raise funds to independently release the album.

In an interview with NPR, Manchester talks about the crowd-funding experience and relays the back-story behind the single "Feelin' for You". A drunk in a juke joint approached Manchester and asked if she was married, to which she replied, "Yes, very happily." The drunk replied, "Too bad, cause I got a feelin' for you." "Feelin' for You", written by Manchester and Sara Niemietz, includes a solo by Keb' Mo'. The single was released on January 9, 2015, and premiered at No. 2 on the Smooth Jazz charts. You Gotta Love the Life was released on February 10, 2015, and hit No. 17 on the Billboard Jazz Albums chart for the week of February 28, 2015.

A second single, "Big Light", featuring a duet with Al Jarreau, along with an accompanying music video, was released for radio on June 15, 2015.

In 2017, more than 25 years after Manchester released Tribute, her 1989 album honoring the female singers who influenced her, she released The Fellas, with covers of male influences including Tony Bennett, Dean Martin, Johnny Mathis, Frank Sinatra, and Mel Torme. This was Manchester's second independently produced studio album, which featured accompaniment by the Blue Note Orchestra from Citrus College in Glendora, CA, where she is artist-in-residence. There was only one duet on the album, 'For Me and My Gal', performed with Barry Manilow.

During the COVID-19 pandemic in 2020, Manchester kept busy working on her 24th album, Re:View, a re-envisioned and reworked compilation of several of her previous hits.

In 2021, she returned to playing club dates, though mainly telling stories and singing just a few songs of her catalog. During one such performance in which she shared the stage with Michael Feinstein, Manchester was surprised by Feinstein and Great American Songbook Foundation Executive Director Christopher Lewis with the Songbook Hall of Fame's New Standard Award.

In 2023, she played Mrs. Brice in the US national tour of the Broadway musical Funny Girl.

== Awards and recognitions ==
- In 1979 and 1980, "Through The Eyes of Love" (from the Ice Castles original soundtrack) and "I'll Never Say Goodbye" (from The Promise) were nominated for Academy Awards (Manchester did not write the songs, and as such, was not an Academy Award nominee).
- Grammy Award: "You Should Hear How She Talks About You" (1982) (Best Female Pop Vocal Performance).
- Bronx Walk of Fame
- Manchester received the Governor's Award from the National Academy of Recording Arts & Sciences for her contributions to the music & recording arts.
- Her body of work to date as a singer/songwriter was a featured exhibit at the Lyman Allyn Art Museum.
- Manchester is an adjunct professor at the USC Thornton School of Music.
- Manchester presented "The Sonic Thermal" at TEDxRiverside explaining her lifelong focus on both random and composed melodies and the back-story behind her first crowd-funded album.
- Melissa was honored by the Great American Songbook Foundation with the Songbook Hall of Fame New Standard Award for her contributions to the American Songbook and her timeless music on May 15, 2021.

== Personal life ==
During the 1970s, Manchester was married to her manager, Larry Brezner. They later divorced. On May 1, 1982, Manchester married Kevin De Remer, who had been serving as her tour coordinator. They have two children and divorced in 2014.

== Discography ==
=== Studio albums ===
- 1973: Home to Myself – US #156
- 1974: Bright Eyes – US #159
- 1975: Melissa – US #12
- 1976: Better Days & Happy Endings – US #24
- 1976: Help Is on the Way – US #60
- 1977: Singin'... – US #60
- 1978: Don't Cry Out Loud – US #33, AUS #75
- 1979: Melissa Manchester – US #63, AUS #93
- 1980: For the Working Girl – US #68
- 1982: Hey Ricky – US #19, AUS #33
- 1983: Emergency – US #135
- 1985: Mathematics – US #144
- 1989: Tribute
- 1995: If My Heart Had Wings
- 1997: Joy
- 2004: When I Look Down That Road
- 2014: You Gotta Love the Life
- 2017: The Fellas
- 2024: Re:View

Live albums

- 2022: Live '77

=== Misc. albums ===
1998: I Sent a Letter to My Love, a musical recorded by L.A. Theatre Works

=== Compilation albums ===
- 1983: Greatest Hits – US #43, AUS #98
- 1984: The Many Moods of Melissa Manchester
- 1996: Best Selection (Japan release)
- 1997: The Essence of Melissa Manchester
- 2001: Midnight Blue: Encore Collection
- 2004: Platinum & Gold Collection
- 2013: Playlist: The Very Best of Melissa Manchester
- 2017: Through The Eyes Of Love: The Complete Arista 7" Singles – 2CD set

=== Songs featured on soundtrack albums and various artist compilations ===
- 1979: "I'll Never Say Goodbye", from the motion picture soundtrack for The Promise
- 1979: "Through the Eyes of Love", from the motion picture soundtrack for Ice Castles – US #179
- 1984: "Your Place or Mine", from the motion picture soundtrack for A Little Sex
- 1984: "Thief of Hearts", from Thief of Hearts soundtrack – US #179
- 1986: "The Music of Goodbye" (duet with Al Jarreau), from Out of Africa soundtrack
- 1986: "Sittin' on a Dream" from The Money Pit soundtrack
- 1986: "Let Me Be Good to You", from Disney's The Great Mouse Detective
- 1989: "Little Nemo", from Little Nemo: Adventures in Slumberland (U.S. release 1992)
- 1989: "Slumberland", from Little Nemo: Adventures in Slumberland (U.S. release 1992)
- 1996: "Stand in the Light", duet with Tats Yamashita on Tatsuro Yamashita-Cozy – Japan #15
- 1998: "Have Yourself A Merry Little Christmas" and "Breath Of Heaven (Mary's Song)" on The Colors of Christmas
- 2003: "Treasure", from Once in a Lifetime-Mayo Okamoto
- 2007: "I Know Who I Am", sung by Leona Lewis on For Colored Girls & The Butler
- 2011: "Rainbird", original song from Dirty Girl

=== Singles ===
Year	Single	Chart Positions				Album
Year	Single	US	US AC	US CB	Various	Album
1967	"Beautiful People" b/w "A Song for You"	—	—	—	—	Single only
1973	"Never Never Land" b/w "Be Happy Now" (from Home to Myself)	—	—	—	—	Single only
1974	O Heaven (How You've Changed Me)" (single remix) b/w "Inclined"	—	—	#112 (Cash Box Looking Ahead)	—	Bright Eyes
1975	"Midnight Blue" b/w "I Got Eyes"	6	1	7	#78 (Australia) #5 (Canada)	Melissa
1975	"Just Too Many People" b/w "This Lady's Not Home Today"	30	2	32	#49 (Canada)	Melissa
1976	"Just You and I" b/w "Sing Sing Sing"	27	3	46	#63 (Canada)	Better Days and Happy Endings
1976	"Better Days" b/w "My Sweet Thing"	71	9	88	#84 (Canada)	Better Days and Happy Endings
1976	"Happy Endings (single edit)" b/w "Rescue Me"	—	33	—	—	Better Days and Happy Endings
1976	"Rescue Me" b/w "Happy Endings"	78	—	#108 (Cash Box Looking Ahead)	—	Better Days and Happy Endings
1976	"Monkey See, Monkey Do" b/w "So's My Old Man"	—	—	—	—	Help Is on the Way
1977	"Be Somebody" b/w "Dirty Work"	—	—	—	—	Help Is on the Way
1977	"I Wanna Be Where You Are (single mix)" b/w "No One's Ever Seen This Side of Me"	—	—	—	—	Singin'
1978	"Don't Cry Out Loud" b/w "We Had This Time"	10	9	10	#57 (Australia) #9 (Canada)	Don't Cry Out Loud
1979	"Through the Eyes of Love (Theme from Ice Castles) (single mix)" b/w "Such a Morning"	76	13	87	#87 (Canada)	Ice Castles (Original Soundtrack) & Don't Cry Out Loud (Single Mix)
1979	"Pretty Girls" b/w "All in the Sky Above"	39	26	44	#80 (Canada)	Melissa Manchester
1980	"Fire in the Morning" b/w "Lights of Dawn"	32	8	35	#89 (Canada)	Melissa Manchester
1980	"If This Is Love" b/w "Talk"	102	19	#103 (Cash Box Looking Ahead)	—	For the Working Girl
1980	"Lovers After All" feat. Peabo Bryson b/w "Happier Than I've Ever Been"	54	25	74	—	For the Working Girl
1980	"Without You" b/w "Boys In The Backroom"	—	—	—	—	For the Working Girl
1982	"Race to the End" b/w "Long Goodbyes" (Non-LP track)	—	—	—	—	Hey Ricky
1982	"You Should Hear How She Talks About You" b/w "Long Goodbyes" (Non-LP track)	5	10	4	#4 (Australia) #5 (Canada) #20 (New Zealand) #8 Billboard Dance Chart	Hey Ricky
1982	"Hey Ricky (You're a Low-Down Heel)" b/w "Come in from the Rain" (1982 Version)	—	—	—	—	Hey Ricky
1983	"Nice Girls" b/w "Hey Ricky"	42	22	40	—	Greatest Hits
1983	"My Boyfriend's Back" b/w "Looking For The Perfect Aah"	—	33	—	#48 (Australia)	Greatest Hits
1983	"No One Can Love You More Than Me" b/w "White Rose"	78	34	—	#75 (Australia)	Emergency
1983	"I Don't Care What the People Say" b/w "Emergency"	—	—	—	—	Emergency
1984	"Thief of Hearts" b/w "Thief of Hearts" (instrumental)	86	18	—	#14 Billboard Dance Chart	Thief of Hearts (Soundtrack)
1985	"Ma+hema+ics" b/w "So Full of Yourself" (Non-LP track) written by Manchester	74	—	73	—	Ma+hema+ics
1985	"Energy" b/w "So Full of Yourself"	—	—	—	—	Ma+hema+ics
1985	"Just One Lifetime" (Barbra Streisand's wedding song) b/w "So Full of Yourself"	—	—	—	—	Ma+hema+ics
1986	"The Music of Goodbye" (with Al Jarreau) b/w "Have You Got A Story For Me?" John Barry (composer)	—	16	—	#75 (UK)	Out of Africa (Soundtrack)
1989	"Walk On By" b/w To Make You Smile Again (1989 Version)	—	6	—	—	Tribute
1995	"In a Perfect World"	—	—	—	—	If My Heart Had Wings
1995	"Here to Love You"	—	—	—	—	If My Heart Had Wings
2004	"After All This Time"	—	—	—	—	When I Look Down That Road
2004	"Bend" b/w "Treasure" (Non-CD track)	—	—	—	—	When I Look Down That Road
2004	"Angels Dancing"	—	—	—	—	When I Look Down That Road
2006	"My Christmas Song for You"	—	—	—	# 21 Canadian Pop Adult (BDS)	Platinum Christmas, Vol. 3
2008	"The Power of Ribbons"	—	—	—	—	The Power Of Ribbons
2011	"You've Got a Friend" (Long Version)	—	—	—	—	Barry Manilow Duets
2011	"Rainbird"	—	—	—	—	Dirty Girl (Soundtrack)
2013	"I Know Who I Am" (Live) (Credit As SongWriter)	—	—	—	—	For Colored Girls (2010) & The Butler (2013) Soundtracks sung by Leona Lewis and Playlist: The Very Best of Melissa Manchester
2013	"Be My Baby"	—	—	—	—	You Gotta Love The Life
2014	"Two Courageous Hearts" (The Remixes by Mig & Mike Rizzo)	—	—	—	#1 King of Spins; Dance Chart	Single only
2015	"Feelin' for You" feat. Keb' Mo'	—	—	—	#2 Smooth Jazz	You Gotta Love the Life
2015	"Big Light" feat. Al Jarreau	—	—	—	—	You Gotta Love the Life
2015	"Open Spaces & Gas Stations" written with James Collins	—	—	—	—	Single only
2016	"Let There Be More Light"	—	—	—	—	Single only
2017	"Ain't That A Kick In The Head"	—	—	—	—	The Fellas
2017	"For Me and My Gal" (video) feat. Barry Manilow	—	—	—	—	The Fellas
2018	"A Better Rainbow"	—	—	—	—	Single only
2020	"Just You And I"	—	—	—	—	Single only
2020	"Midnight Blue"	—	—	—	—	Single only
2020	"Don't Cry Out Loud"	—	—	—	—	Single only
2021	"You Should Hear How She Talks About You"	—	—	—	—	Single only
2021	"Covid-19 Blues" feat. Tony Orlando	—	—	—	—	Single only
2021	"Fire In The Morning"	—	—	—	—	Single only
2022	"Come In From The Rain"	—	—	—	—	Single only
2022	"You Can't Hide The Light" (Duet with Johnny Schaefer)	—	—	—	#1 Dance Track and UK Award Winning song and video	Single only
2022	"Through The Eyes Of Love"	—	—	—	—	Single only
2023	"Lessons To Be Learned"	—	—	—	—	Single only
2023	Whenever I Call You Friend (Duet with Kenny Loggins)	—	—	—	—	From the forthcoming album Re:View 2050
2024	Midnight Blue (Duet with Dolly Parton) b/w Confide In Me	—	—	—	—	From the forthcoming album Re:View 2050

=== Guest appearances ===
Year	Song title	Artist	Album
1972	"Deteriorata", "Magical Misery Tour"	National Lampoon	Radio Dinner
1977	"They Never Met"	Martin Mull	I'm Everyone I've Ever Loved
1978	"A Half Hour of Heaven (and Eight Hours of Sleep)"	Martin Mull	Sex & Violins
1990	"Making Every Moment Count"	Peter Allen	Making Every Moment Count
1996	"Stand in the Light"	Tatsuro Yamashita	Cozy
2000	"A Mother and Father's Prayer"	Collin Raye	Counting Sheep
2002	"Never Let Me Go"	Michael Feinstein	Livingston & Evans Songbook
2008	"You've Got a Friend"	Barry Manilow	Greatest Songs of the 70's
2010	"You've Lost That Lovin' Feeling" & "What You Won't Do for Love" (not released yet)	Juice Newton	Duets: Friends & Memories
2018	"A Fine Romance"	Oleg Frish	Duets With My American Idols
2019	"I've Got My Love To Keep Me Warm"	Keb' Mo'	Moonlight, Mistletoe & You

== Filmography ==
Manchester appeared on the Blossom television series as Maddy Russo, from 1993 to 1995. She played Corrine in the feature film For the Boys (1991) and the piano teacher in Dirty Girl (2010). In addition to live performances as herself, Manchester composes and performs songs and has done character voice in animated works.

Selected feature film titles
Year	Title	Capacity
1978	The Promise	Performance
1980	The Music of Melissa Manchester	Performance
1984	The Last Starfighter	"Just One Star Beyond", written by Melissa and Craig Safan for the Sci-Fi Cult Classic The Last Starfighter
1986	The Great Mouse Detective	Songwriter, Voice of Miss Kitty Mouse
1991	For the Boys	Actor
1992	Little Nemo: Adventures in Slumberland	Musical Performer
1993	Precious Moments: Simon the Lamb	Duet with James Ingram – "The Brightest Star"
1998	Precious Moments: Timmy's Special Delivery	Reprise of duet with James Ingram – "The Brightest Star"
2001	Lady and the Tramp II: Scamp's Adventure	Songwriter
2010	Michel Legrand & Friends: 50 Years of Music and Movies	Performance
2010	Dirty Girl	Actor
2010	For Colored Girls	Songwriter – "I Know Who I Am"
