= Hey Ricky =

Studio album by Melissa Manchester
- Released: April 1982
- Studio: Sunset Sound and Cherokee Studios (Hollywood, California); Westlake Studios (Los Angeles, California); Record Plant and Atlantic Studios (New York City, New York)
- Genre: Pop; pop rock; synth-pop; new wave
- Length: 38:56
- Label: Arista
- Producer: Arif Mardin

Melissa Manchester chronology
For the Working Girl (1980)	Hey Ricky (1982)	Greatest Hits (1983)

Professional ratings
Review scores
Source	Rating
AllMusic	2/5 stars

Hey Ricky is the title of the tenth album release by Melissa Manchester. It was issued on Arista Records in April 1982.

During the interim between the release of Hey Ricky and that of the precedent For the Working Girl in September 1980 Manchester had attempted to extricate herself from her recording contract, filing suit in May 1981 for contractual release from Arista. However it was announced that October that the singer and label had reached terms and the track "Race to the End" - a vocal version of the Chariots of Fire theme - was recorded for single release. The producer was Arif Mardin who had previously collaborated with Manchester in 1979 on "Theme from Ice Castles".

Mardin proceeded to collaborate with Manchester on the tracks which would comprise the album Hey Ricky released in April 1982. The lead single "You Should Hear How She Talks About You," originally recorded by Charlie Dore ("Pilot of the Airwaves"), radically reinvented Manchester as a synthpop dance artist and was heavily promoted by the singer who displayed a new image complementing the track. "You Should Hear How She Talks About You" accrued gradual interest entering the Top 40 of the "Billboard" Hot 100 in July 1982 proceeding to the Top Ten that August with a career best peak for Manchester at #5. The single's popularity was reflected in that of its parent album which Billboard ranked with a #19 peak.

The other cuts on Hey Ricky included the 1981 "Race to the End" single, a duet with David Gates: "Wish We Were Heroes"; "Your Place or Mine" from the soundtrack of the feature film A Little Sex, and a new version of "Come in From the Rain" introduced by Manchester on her 1976 Better Days and Happy Endings album: the last-named song had been co-written with Manchester's most constant lyricist of the 1970s Carole Bayer-Sager who was also represented on Hey Ricky with a new (and final) songwriting collaboration with Manchester entitled ""Looking for the Perfect Ahh" (co-written by Robbie Buchanan). The title cut "Hey Ricky" was written by Manchester with Bernie Taupin the lyricist for Elton John in the first phase of the latter's recording career: "Hey Ricky" was the second (and final) Manchester/ Taupin songwriting collaboration, the pair - after meeting via having the same manager - having collaborated on the title cut of Manchester's 1980 album release For the Working Girl. Issued as the follow-up single to "You Should Hear How She Talks About You", "Hey Ricky" would fail to chart.

After a 1983 Greatest Hits album release Manchester would release only one more album on Arista, then part company with the label, retaining the dance artist focus of her "You Should Hear How She Talks About You" hit for her one album with MCA.

== Track listing ==
1. "You Should Hear How She Talks About You" (Dean Pitchford, Tom Snow) - 4:18
2. "Slowly" (Ken Bell, Terry Skinner, Gerry L. Wallace) - 3:31
3. "Hey Ricky (You're a Low Down Heel)" (Melissa Manchester, Bernie Taupin) - 4:15
4. "I'll Always Love You" (Tom Snow, Eric Kaz) - 3:32
5. "Race to the End" (Vangelis, Jon Anderson) - 3:52
6. "Wish We Were Heroes" featuring David Gates (Austin Gravelding) - 4:12
7. "Come in From the Rain" (Manchester, Carole Bayer-Sager) - 4:20
8. "Looking for the Perfect Ahh" (Manchester, Carole Bayer-Sager, Robbie Buchanan) - 3:15
9. "Your Place or Mine" (Manchester, Allee Willis, David Paul Bryant) - 3:50
10. "Someone to Watch Over Me" (George Gershwin, Ira Gershwin) - 3:52
11. "Long Goodbyes" (Melissa Manchester) - 4:15 - bonus track on Japan reissue
12. "My Boyfriend’s Back - Long Version" (Bob Feldman, Jerry Goldstein, Richard Gottehrer) - 5:15 - bonus track on Japan reissue

== Track-by-track personnel ==
=== "You Should Hear How She Talks About You" ===
- Melissa Manchester – lead vocals
- Robbie Buchanan – synthesizers, rhythm arrangements
- Steve Lukather – guitars
- Abraham Laboriel – bass
- Jeff Porcaro – drums
- Larry Williams – alto saxophone
- Will Lee, Millie Whiteside, Ula Hedwig – backing vocals

=== "Slowly" ===
- Melissa Manchester – lead vocals, backing vocals
- Robbie Buchanan – keyboards, synthesizers
- Steve Lukather, Michael Landau – guitars
- Nathan East – bass
- Jeff Porcaro – drums
- Millie Whiteside, Ula Hedwig, Will Lee – backing vocals
- Arif Mardin – rhythm arrangements
- Cengiz Yaltkaya – string arrangements and conductor

=== "Hey Ricky (You're a Low Down Heel)" ===
- Melissa Manchester – lead vocals
- Robbie Buchanan – electric piano, synthesizers
- Larry Williams – alto saxophone, additional synthesizers
- Michael Landau – guitars
- Abraham Laboriel – bass
- Jeff Porcaro – drums
- Robin Beck, Will Lee, Millie Whiteside – backing vocals

=== "I'll Always Love You" ===
- Melissa Manchester – lead vocals
- Robbie Buchanan – electric piano, synthesizers
- Dean Parks – acoustic guitar
- Abraham Laboriel – bass
- Jeff Porcaro – drums
- Tom Snow – backing vocals
- Arif Mardin – rhythm arrangements

=== "Race to The End" ===
- Melissa Manchester – lead vocals
- Robbie Buchanan – acoustic piano, synthesizers
- Dean Parks – guitars
- Abraham Laboriel – bass
- Jeff Porcaro – drums
- Arif Mardin – rhythm arrangements

=== "Wish We Were Heroes" ===
- Melissa Manchester – vocals
- Robbie Buchanan – electric piano, synthesizers
- David Gates – vocals, acoustic guitar
- David Spinozza – acoustic guitar, electric guitar
- Hugh McCracken – acoustic guitar
- Don Brooks – harmonica
- Dennis Belfield – bass
- Ed Greene – drums
- Arif Mardin – rhythm arrangements

=== "Come in from The Rain" ===
- Melissa Manchester – lead vocals
- Robbie Buchanan – acoustic piano, Prophet-5 synthesizer
- Bob Christianson – additional synthesizers
- Dean Parks – guitars
- Abraham Laboriel – bass
- Jeff Porcaro – drums
- Arif Mardin – arrangements

=== "Looking for The Perfect Ahh" ===
- Melissa Manchester – lead vocals, backing vocals
- Robbie Buchanan – keyboards, synthesizers, rhythm arrangements
- Dean Parks – guitars
- Abraham Laboriel – bass
- Jeff Porcaro – drums
- Hamish Stuart, Lani Groves, Robin Beck, Will Lee – backing vocals

=== "Your Place or Mine" ===
- Melissa Manchester – lead vocals
- Robbie Buchanan – electric piano, synthesizers, rhythm arrangements
- Dean Parks – guitars
- Abraham Laboriel – bass
- John Robinson – drums
- Sammy Figueroa – percussion
- Hamish Stuart – backing vocals

=== "Someone to Watch Over Me" ===
- Melissa Manchester – lead vocals
- Stuart Elster – acoustic piano
- Jim Henken – guitars
- Cliff Hugo – bass
- Sinclair Lott – drums
- David Manchester – bassoon
- Steve Cagan – conductor, rhythm and string arrangements

=== Production ===
- Arif Mardin – producer, remixing (1–4, 6–10)
- Jeremy Smith – recording, remixing (5)
- Michael O'Reilly – remixing (1–4, 6–10), additional recording
- Lew Hahn – remix assistant (1–4, 6–10), additional recording
- Jay Messina – additional recording
- Terry Christianson – assistant engineer
- Larold Rebhun – assistant engineer
- Gray Russell – assistant engineer
- George Marino – mastering at Sterling Sound (New York, NY)
- Frank DeCaro – production coordinator
- Chrissy Allerdings – production coordinating assistant
- Gene Orloff – concertmaster
- Jean Hugo – concertmaster
- Ria Lewerke-Shapiro – art direction
- George Hurrell – photography
- Michael Lippman – management

== Charting History ==
=== Weekly charts ===
Chart (1982)	Position
United States (Billboard 200)	19
Australia (Kent Music Report)	33

=== Year end charts ===
Year End Chart (1982)	Peak position
U.S. Billboard 200	79

=== Charting Singles ===
Single	Chart	Position
You Should Hear How She Talks About You	Australian (KMR)	4
You Should Hear How She Talks About You	Canada (RPM)	5
You Should Hear How She Talks About You	Official New Zealand Music Chart	20
You Should Hear How She Talks About You	U.S.Billboard Hot 100	5
You Should Hear How She Talks About You	U.S. Billboard Adult Contemporary	10
You Should Hear How She Talks About You	US BillboardDance Club Songs	8
