= If My Heart Had Wings (album) =

Studio album by Melissa Manchester
- Released: January 24, 1995
- Studios: Rumbo, Record One, and Image (Los Angeles, California); Conway and Andora (Hollywood, California); Can-Am (Tarzana, California); Aire L.A. (Glendale, California); Atlantic and Skyline (New York City, New York)
- Genre: Pop
- Length: 41:18
- Label: Atlantic
- Producers: Arif Mardin; Jud Friedman; Ron Nevison; Melissa Manchester

Melissa Manchester chronology
Tribute (1989)	If My Heart Had Wings (1995)	Joy (1997)

If My Heart Had Wings is an album by the American musician Melissa Manchester, released in 1995. It was a commercial disappointment.

Manchester promoted the album by performing its first single, "In a Perfect World", on the soap opera General Hospital.

== Production ==
The album was executive produced by Arif Mardin and Michael Lippman. Due to Manchester's work on the musical I Sent a Letter to My Love, the album was produced over a period of two years. "If My Heart Had Wings" was written with Amy Sky.

== Critical reception ==
Professional ratings
Review scores
Source	Rating
AllMusic	3/5 stars
The Atlanta Journal-Constitution	1/4 stars
The Encyclopedia of Popular Music	3/5 stars
Entertainment Weekly	C+
MusicHound Rock: The Essential Album Guide	3/5 stars
Pittsburgh Post-Gazette	1/4 stars

Entertainment Weekly wrote that, "too often, the tunes on If My Heart Had Wings sound like bland anthems in search of a maudlin movie score." The Pittsburgh Post-Gazette thought that "Manchester turns in a hopelessly-out-of-it performance that serves as a harsh reminder that having great pipes is no guarantee of success." The Atlanta Journal-Constitution opined that it was "too bad Manchester couldn't take a cue from Bonnie Raitt, whose music has grown along with her shock of gray hair and her insight."

AllMusic wrote that the album was "filled with big, dramatic ballads and widescreen production values." MusicHound Rock: The Essential Album Guide considered the album to be "not a great work [but] representative of her talent."

== Track listing ==
No.	Title	Writer(s)	Length
1.	"The House That Love Built"	Melissa Manchester; Dana Merino; Matt Sherrod	4:25
2.	"In a Perfect World"	Jud Friedman; Alan Rich; Wendy Waldman	4:14
3.	"If My Heart Had Wings"	Manchester; Eric Kaz; Amy Sky	4:13
4.	"Heart of Love"	Billie Hughes; Roxanne Seeman	4:23
5.	"To Be in Love with Me"	Jody Davidson	3:55
6.	"Here to Love You"	Michael McDonald	4:25
7.	"Higher Ground"	Kent Agee; Steve Dorff; George Green	4:18
8.	"Crazy People"	Edgar Leslie; James V. Monaco	2:33
9.	"Moments Like This"	Rich; Pam Reswick; Steve Werfel	4:42
10.	"Don't Let Me Walk This Road Alone"	David Foster; Keith Thomas; Linda Thompson	4:10

== Personnel ==
- Melissa Manchester – vocals, backing vocals (6), arrangements (6, 8)
- Robbie Kondor – keyboards (1), keyboard programming (1), arrangements (1), additional keyboards (7)
- Joe Mardin – additional keyboards (1), cymbals (1), hi-hat (1)
- Steve Skinner – additional keyboards (1), keyboards (5, 7), programming (5, 7), arrangements (5, 7)
- Scott Alspach – keyboards (2), programming (2)
- Jud Friedman – keyboards (2), programming (2), string arrangements (2)
- Robbie Buchanan – keyboards (3, 9, 10), arrangements (9)
- Claude Gaudette – keyboards (4, 6), orchestra programming and arrangements (4)
- Tom Salisbury – acoustic piano (6), backing vocals (6)
- Michael Lang – acoustic piano (8)
- John Putnam – guitars (1, 7)
- Teddy Castellucci – guitars (2)
- Tim Pierce – guitars (3, 10)
- Peter Hume – guitars (6), backing vocals (6)
- Dennis Budimir – guitars (8)
- Michael Landau – guitars (9)
- Will Lee – bass (1, 7)
- Cliff Hugo – bass (6)
- Chuck Berghofer – bass (8)
- Neil Stubenhaus – bass (9)
- Bob Harsen – drums (3, 10)
- Carlos Vega – drums (4, 6)
- Vinnie Colaiuta – drums (8, 9)
- Brian Kilgore – percussion (2)
- Efrain Toro – percussion (6)
- Roger Rosenberg – baritone saxophone (1)
- Andy Snitzer – tenor saxophone (1)
- Danny Wilensky – alto saxophone (5)
- Doug Norwine – saxophone (6)
- Gary Foster – clarinet (8)
- Charles Loper – trombone (8)
- Jimmy Hynes – trumpet (1)
- Frank Szabo – trumpet (8)
- Melissa Hasin – cello (7)
- Jimbo Ross – viola (7)
- Margaret Wooten – violin (7)
- Richard Greene – violin solo (7)
- Arif Mardin – arrangements (1, 7–9), string arrangements (7), orchestration (9)
- David Campbell – string arrangements (2)
- Gene Orloff – concertmaster (9)
- Johnny Mandel – string arrangements (10)
- Christopher Tate – choir master (1, 3)
- Deborah A. Alexander, Beverly Dangerfield, Ettamaria Ellis, Warren Harrington, Dewayne C. Knox, Charles May and Linda T. Willis – backing vocals (1, 3)
- Jerry Barnes – additional backing vocals (1)
- Katreese Barnes – additional backing vocals (1)
- Rachele Cappelli – additional backing vocals (1)
- Sue Holder – backing vocals (6)
- Carolyn Willis – backing vocals (6)
- Peggi Blu – backing vocals (9)
- Ollie Cregget – backing vocals (9)
- Jim Gilstrap – backing vocals (9)
- Phillip Ingram – backing vocals (9)
- Witnley Phipps – vocals (10)

Production

- Michael Lippman – executive producer, management
- Arif Mardin – executive producer, producer (1, 5, 7–9)
- Jud Friedman – producer (2)
- Ron Nevison – producer (3, 4, 10), engineer (3, 4, 10)
- Melissa Manchester – producer (6)
- Michael O'Reilly – engineer (1, 5, 7, 8), remixing (1, 5, 7–9)
- Taavi Mote – engineer (2), remixing (2)
- Chris Lord-Alge – remixing (3, 4, 10)
- Jeremy Smith – additional engineer (5), engineer (6, 9), remixing (6)
- Corey Baker – assistant engineer
- Greg Barrett – assistant engineer
- Shawn Berman – assistant engineer
- Brian Broadwater – assistant engineer
- Bruce Buchanan – assistant engineer
- John Jackson – assistant engineer
- Rail Rogut – assistant engineer
- Brian Soucy – assistant engineer
- Andy Udoff – assistant engineer
- Doug Sax – mastering at The Mastering Lab (Hollywood, California)
- Frank DeCaro – production assistant
- Lisa Maldonado – production assistant
- Deandra Vallier – production assistant
- Melanie Nissen – art direction
- Richard Bates – design
- Donald May – design
- Glen Earler – photography
