= 37th Golden Globe Awards =

Film award ceremony in 1980

- Date: January 26, 1980

Highlights
- Best Film: Drama: Kramer vs. Kramer
- Best Film: Musical or Comedy: Breaking Away

Television coverage
- Network: KHJ-TV

The 37th Golden Globe Awards, honoring the best in film and television for 1979, were held on January 26, 1980.

== Winners ==
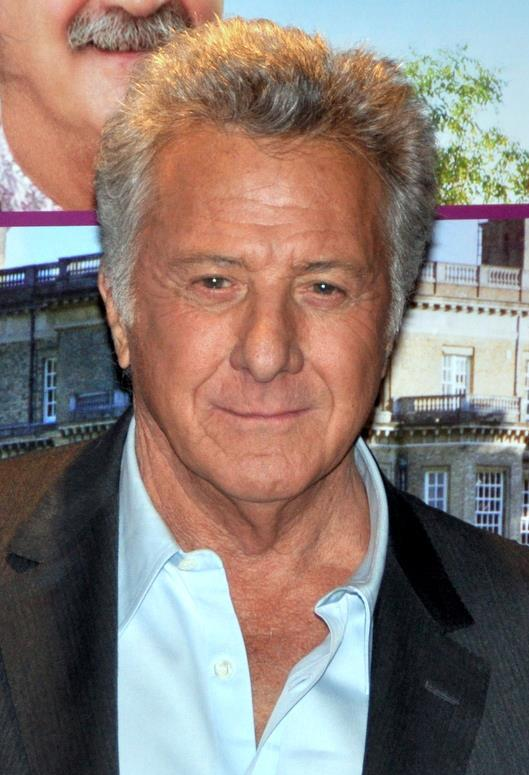
Dustin Hoffman — Best Actor in a Motion Picture, Drama winner

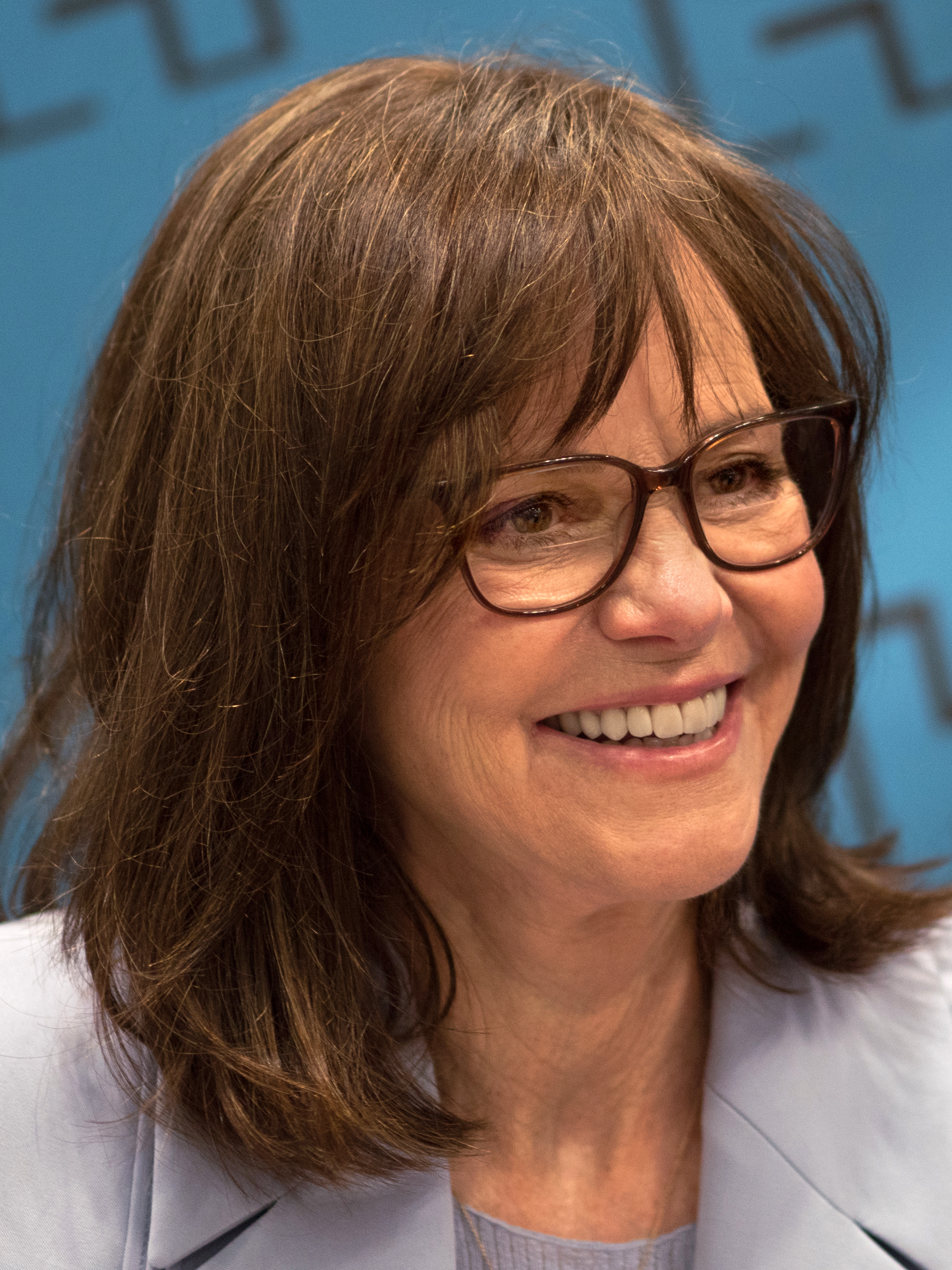
Sally Field — Best Actress in a Motion Picture, Drama winner

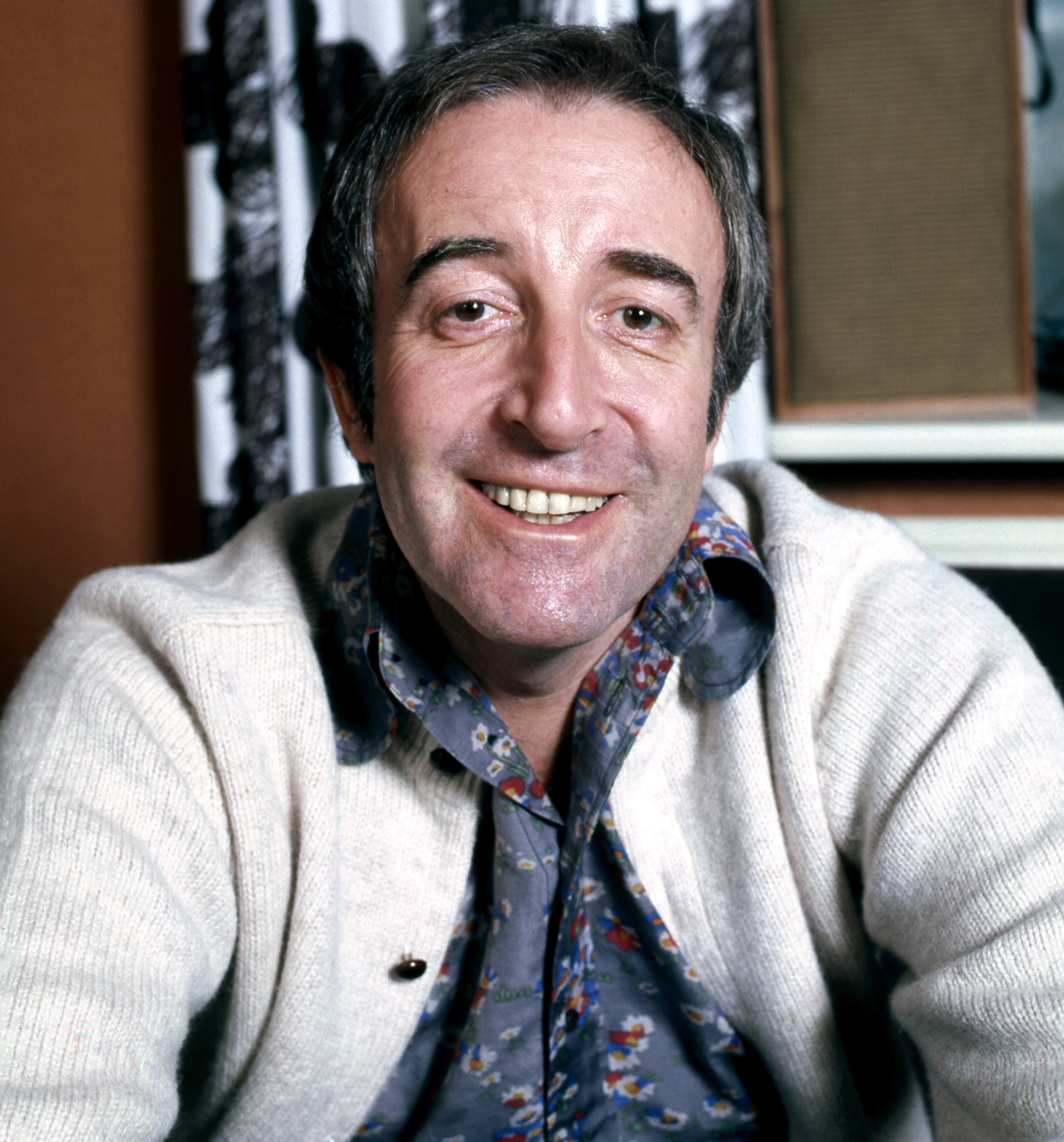
Peter Sellers — Best Actor in a Motion Picture, Comedy or Musical winner

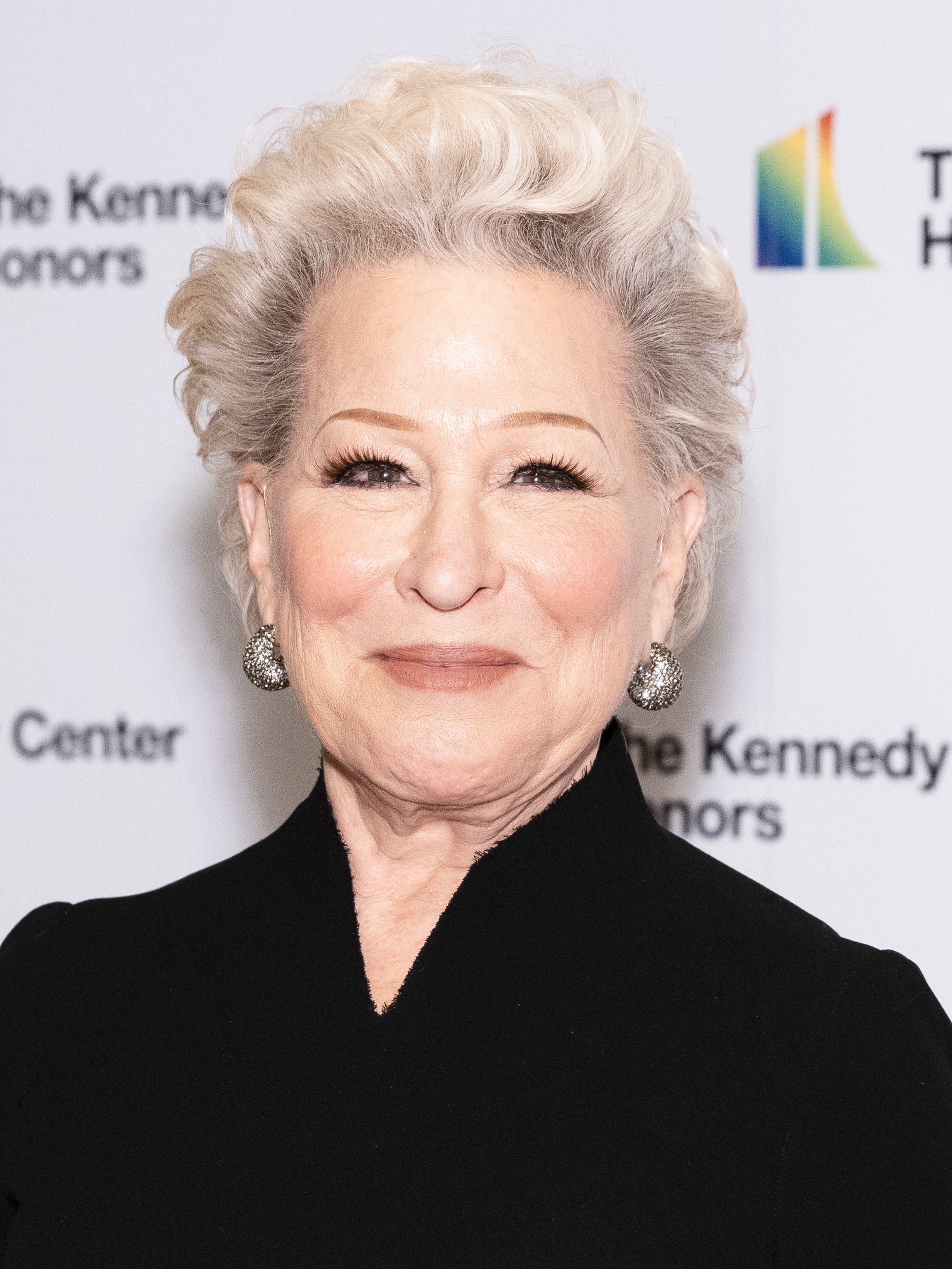
Bette Midler — Best Actress in a Motion Picture, Comedy or Musical winner

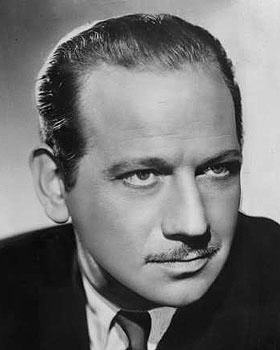
Melvyn Douglas — Best Supporting Actor in a Motion Picture, co-winner

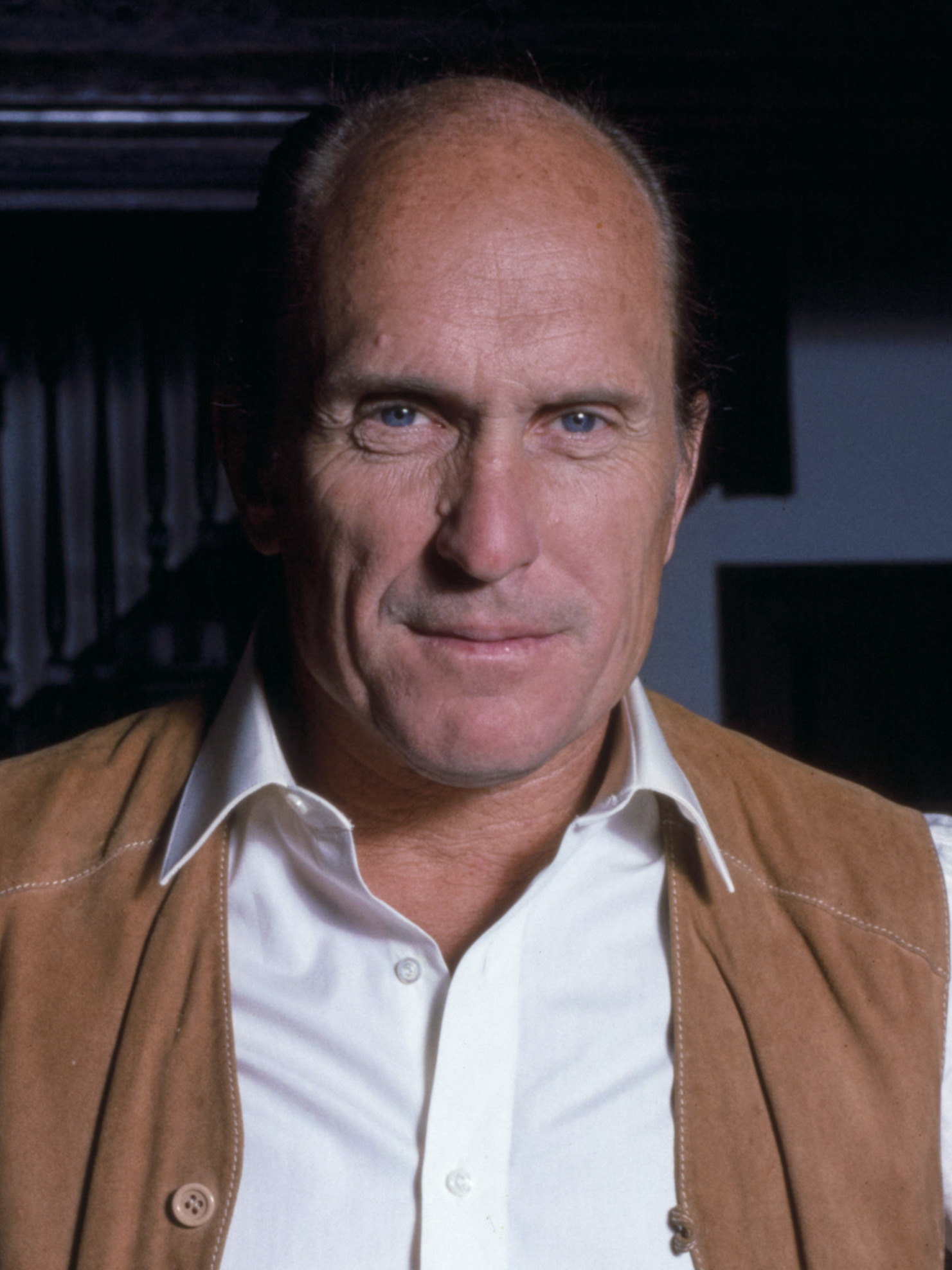
Robert Duvall — Best Supporting Actor in a Motion Picture, co-winner

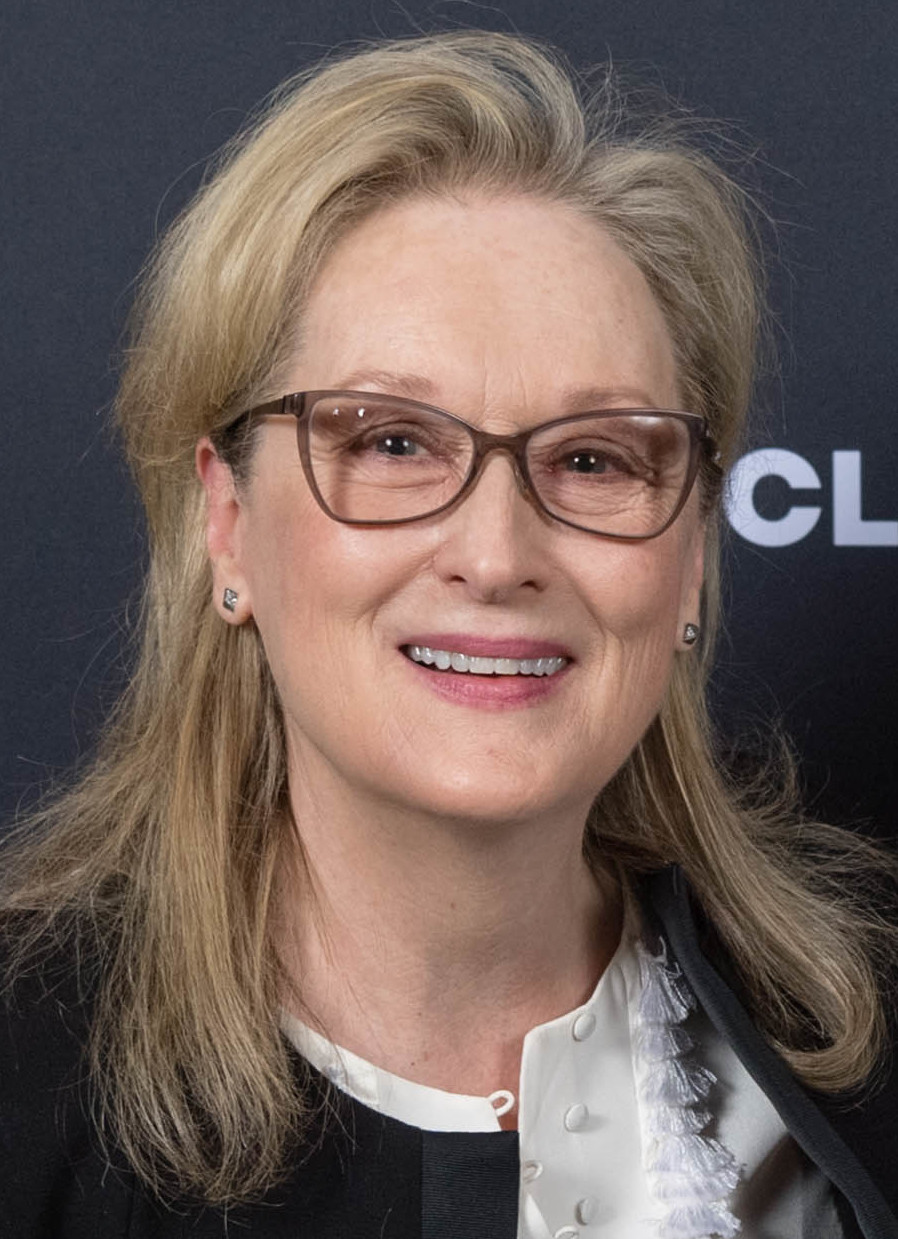
Meryl Streep — Best Supporting Actress in a Motion Picture, winner

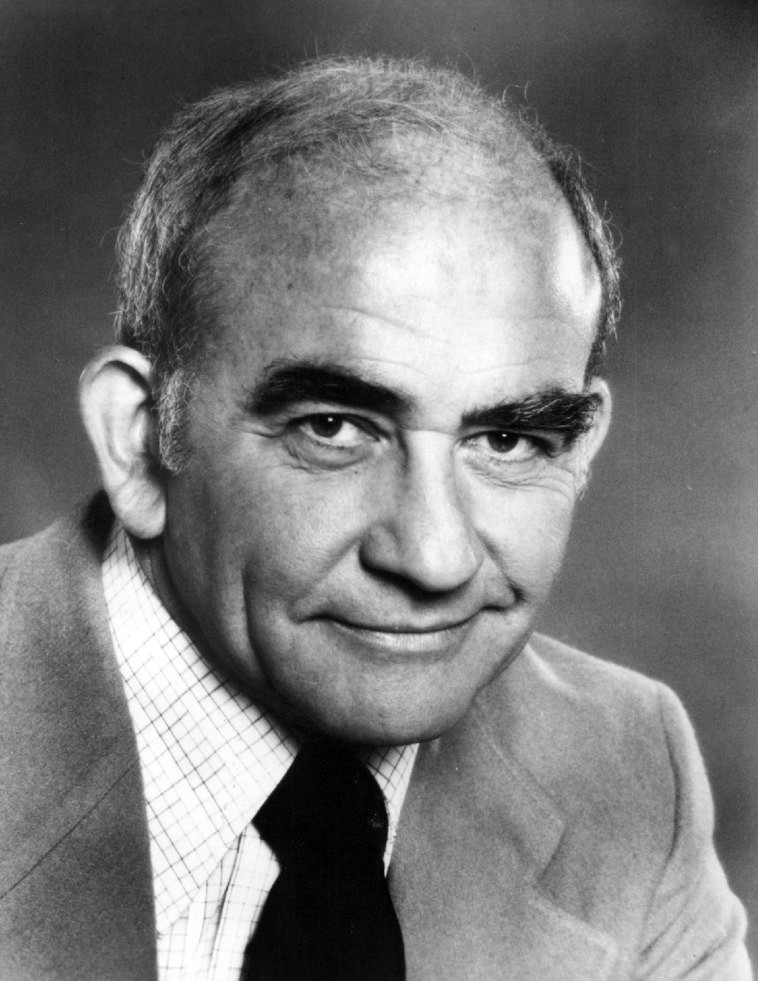
Ed Asner — Best Actor in a Television Series, Drama winner

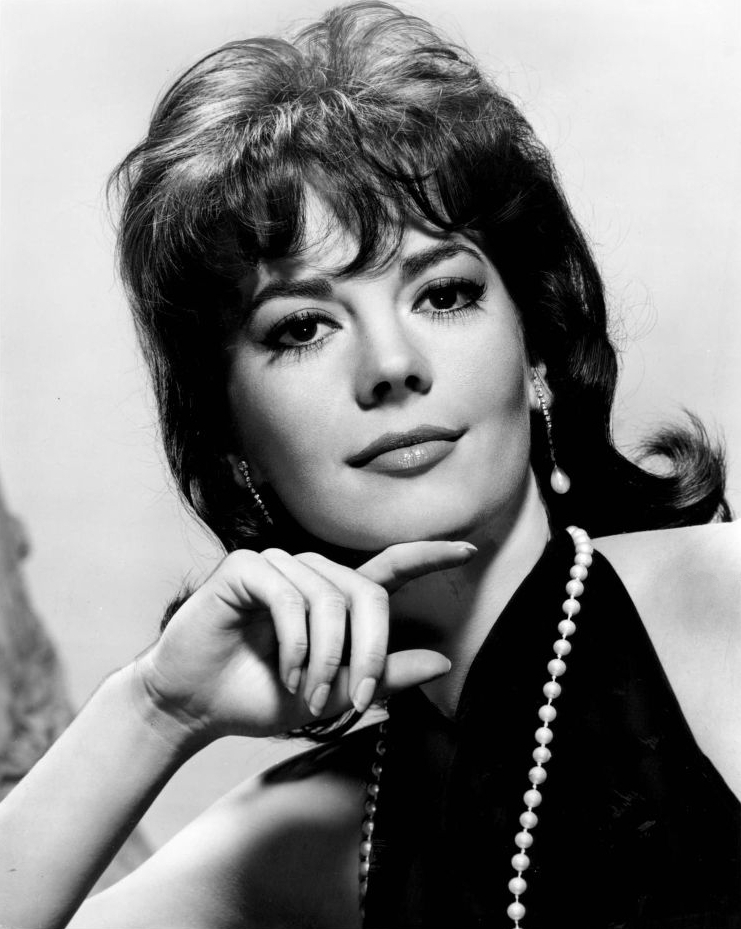
Natalie Wood — Best Actress in a Television Series, Drama winner

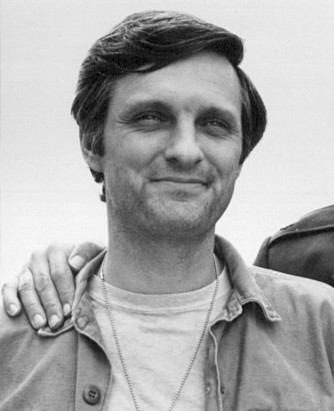
Alan Alda — Best Actor in a Television Series, Comedy or Musical winner

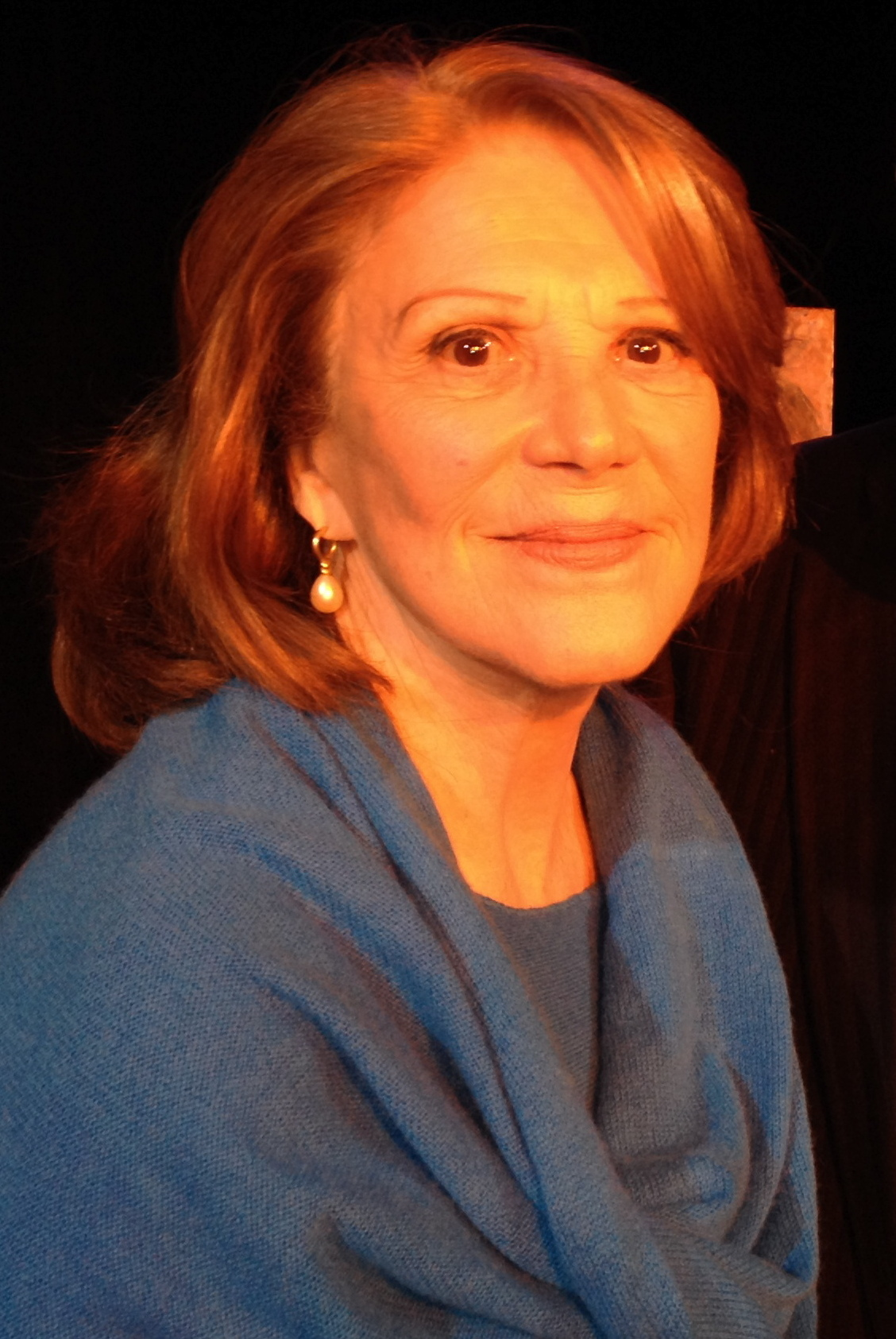
Linda Lavin — Best Actress in a Television Series, Comedy or Musical winner

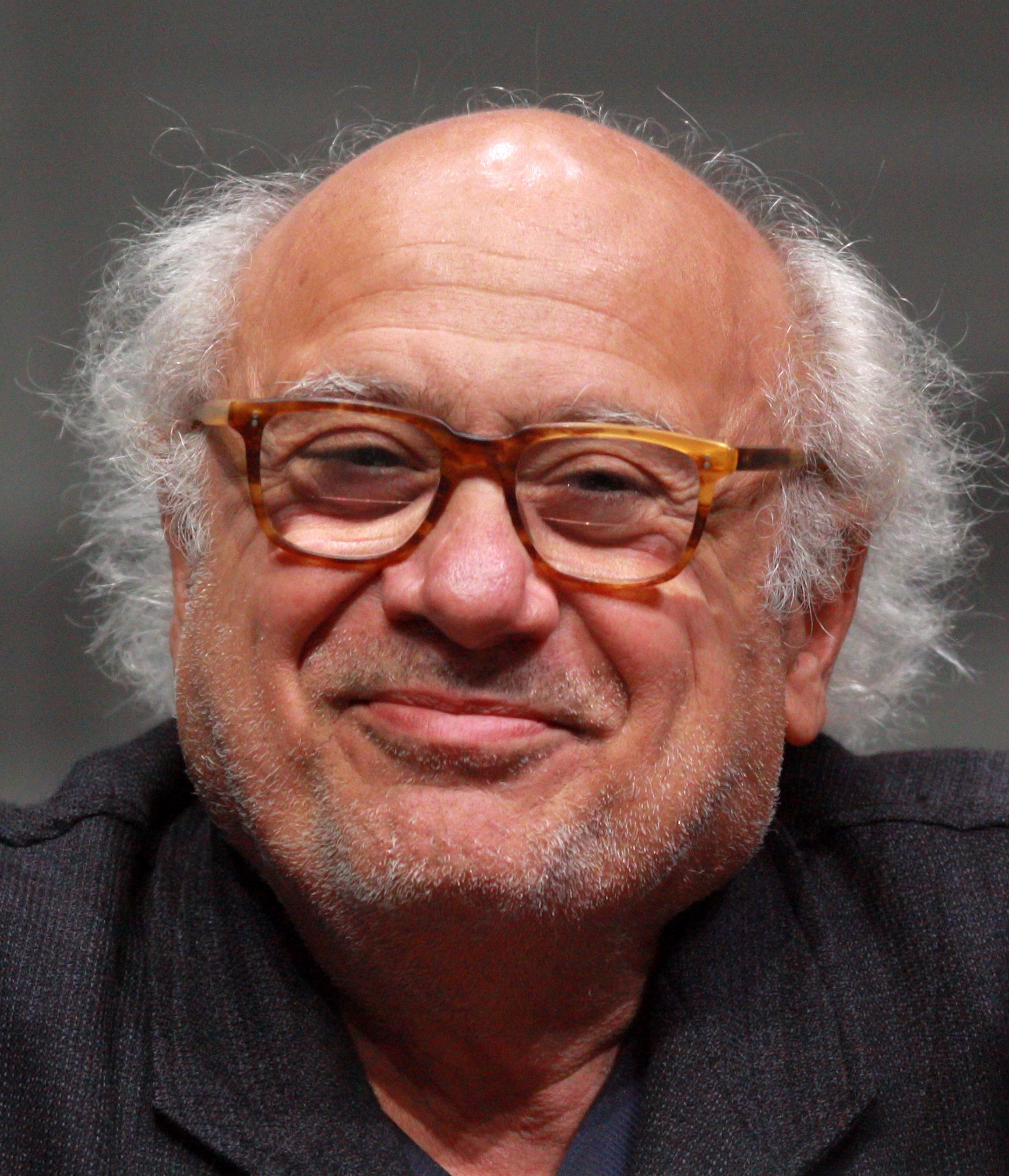
Danny Devito — Best Supporting Actor in a Series, Miniseries or Television Film co-winner

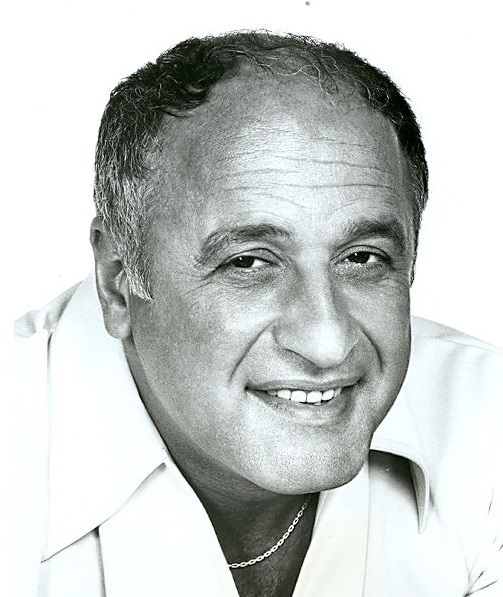
Vic Tayback — Best Supporting Actor in a Series, Miniseries or Television Film co-winner

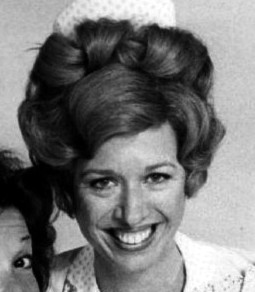
Polly Holliday — Best Supporting Actress in a Series, Miniseries or Television Film winner

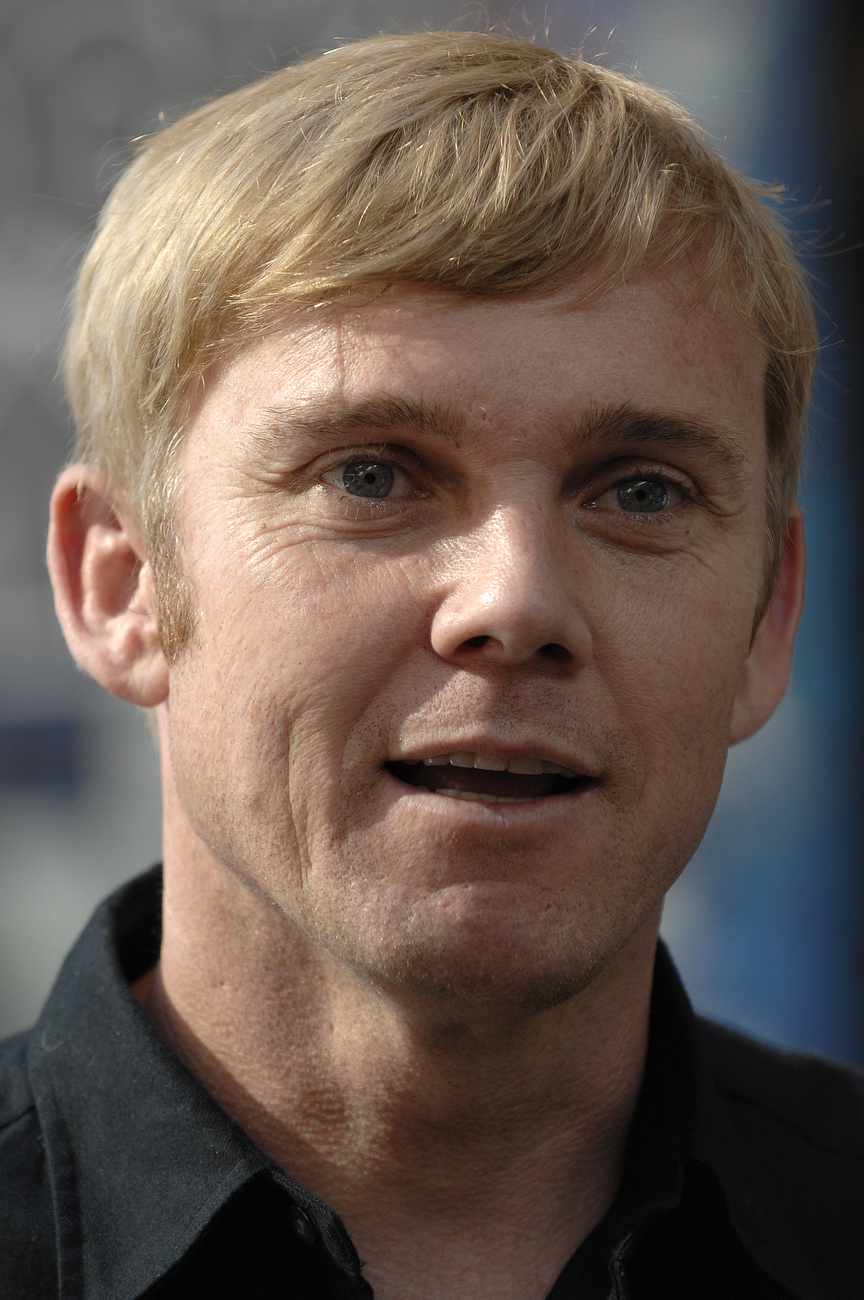
Ricky Schroder — New Star of the Year – Actor winner. He becoming the youngest winner of Golden Globe.

=== Film ===
Best Motion Picture
Drama	Comedy or Musical
Kramer vs. Kramer; Apocalypse Now; The China Syndrome; Manhattan; Norma Rae	Breaking Away; 10; Being There; Hair; The Rose
Best Performance in a Motion Picture – Drama
Actor	Actress
Dustin Hoffman – Kramer vs. Kramer as Ted Kramer; Jack Lemmon – The China Syndrome as Jack Godell; Al Pacino – ...And Justice for All. as Arthur Kirkland; Jon Voight – The Champ as Billy Flynn; James Woods – The Onion Field as Gregory Powell	Sally Field – Norma Rae as Norma Rae Webster; Jill Clayburgh – La Luna as Caterina Silveri; Lisa Eichhorn – Yanks as Jean Moreton; Jane Fonda – The China Syndrome as Kimberly Wells; Marsha Mason – Promises in the Dark as Dr. Alexandra Kendall
Best Performance in a Motion Picture – Comedy or Musical
Actor	Actress
Peter Sellers – Being There as Chance; George Hamilton – Love at First Bite as Count Dracula; Dudley Moore – 10 as George Webber; Burt Reynolds – Starting Over as Phil Potter; Roy Scheider – All That Jazz as Joe Gideon	Bette Midler – The Rose as Mary Rose Foster; Julie Andrews – 10 as Samantha Taylor; Jill Clayburgh – Starting Over as Marilyn Holmberg; Shirley MacLaine – Being There as Eve Rand; Marsha Mason – Chapter Two as Jennie MacLaine
Best Supporting Performance in a Motion Picture – Drama, Comedy or Musical
Supporting Actor	Supporting Actress
Melvyn Douglas – Being There as Benjamin Rand; Robert Duvall – Apocalypse Now as Lt. Col. Bill Kilgore; Frederic Forrest – The Rose as Huston Dyer; Justin Henry – Kramer vs. Kramer as Billy Kramer; Laurence Olivier – A Little Romance as Julius	Meryl Streep – Kramer vs. Kramer as Joanna Kramer; Jane Alexander – Kramer vs. Kramer as Margaret Phelps; Kathleen Beller – Promises in the Dark as Elizabeth (Buffy) Koenig; Candice Bergen – Starting Over as Jessica Potter; Valerie Harper – Chapter Two as Faye Medwick
Other
Best Director	Best Screenplay
Francis Ford Coppola – Apocalypse Now; Hal Ashby – Being There; Robert Benton – Kramer vs. Kramer; James Bridges – The China Syndrome; Peter Yates – Breaking Away	Kramer vs. Kramer – Robert Benton; Being There – Jerzy Kosinski; Breaking Away – Steve Tesich; The China Syndrome – James Bridges, T. S. Cook and Mike Gray; Norma Rae – Irving Ravetch and Harriet Frank Jr.
Best Original Score	Best Original Song
Apocalypse Now – Carmine Coppola and Francis Ford Coppola; 10 – Henry Mancini; Alien – Jerry Goldsmith; The Amityville Horror – Lalo Schifrin; The Black Stallion – Carmine Coppola; A Little Romance – Georges Delerue; Star Trek: The Motion Picture – Jerry Goldsmith	"The Rose" (Amanda McBroom) – The Rose; "Better Than Ever" (Marvin Hamlisch, Carole Bayer Sager) – Starting Over; "The Main Event" (Paul Jabara, Bruce Roberts) – The Main Event; "Rainbow Connection" (Paul Williams, Kenny Ascher) – The Muppet Movie; "Through the Eyes of Love" (Marvin Hamlisch, Carole Bayer Sager) – Ice Castles
New Star of the Year – Actor	New Star of the Year – Actress
Ricky Schroder – The Champ as Timothy Joseph ("T.J.") Flynn; Dennis Christopher – Breaking Away as Dave Stoller; Justin Henry – Kramer vs. Kramer as Billy Kramer; Dean Paul Martin – Players as Chris; Treat Williams – Hair as George Berger	Bette Midler – The Rose as Mary Rose Foster; Susan Anton – Goldengirl as Goldine; Bo Derek – 10 as Jenny Hanley; Lisa Eichhorn – Yanks as Jean Moreton; Lynn-Holly Johnson – Ice Castles as Alexis "Lexie" Winston
Best Foreign Film
La Cage aux Folles (France); The Europeans (United Kingdom); The Marriage of Maria Braun (West Germany); Soldier of Orange (Netherlands); Till Marriage Do Us Part (Italy)

The following films received multiple nominations:

Nominations	Title
8	Kramer vs. Kramer
6	Being There
5	The China Syndrome
5	The Rose
5	10
4	Apocalypse Now
4	Breaking Away
4	Starting Over
3	Norma Rae
2	The Champ
2	Chapter Two
2	Hair
2	Ice Castles
2	A Little Romance
2	Promises in the Dark
2	Yanks

The following films received multiple wins:

Wins	Title
4	Kramer vs. Kramer
3	Apocalypse Now
3	The Rose
2	Being There

=== Television ===
Best Television Series
Drama	Musical or Comedy
Lou Grant: Backstairs at the White House; Centennial; Dallas; The Rockford Files; Roots: The Next Generations	Alice (TIE) Taxi (TIE): The Associates; The Love Boat; M*A*S*H
Best Performance in a Television Series Drama
Actor	Actress
Ed Asner - Lou Grant as Lou Grant: Richard Chamberlain - Centennial as Alexander McKeag; Erik Estrada - CHiPs as Officer Francis Llewellyn 'Ponch' Poncherello; James Garner - The Rockford Files as Jim Rockford; John Houseman - The Paper Chase as Professor Charles W. Kingsfield, Jr.; Martin Sheen - Blind Ambition as John Dean; Robert Urich - Vega$ as Dan Tanna; Robert Wagner - Hart to Hart as Jonathan Hart	Natalie Wood - From Here to Eternity as Karen Holmes: Barbara Bel Geddes - Dallas as Miss Ellie Ewing; Kate Mulgrew - Mrs. Columbo as Kate Columbo; Stefanie Powers - Hart to Hart as Jennifer Hart; Sada Thompson - Family as Kate Lawrence
Best Performance in a Television Series – Musical or Comedy
Actor	Actress
Alan Alda - M*A*S*H as Benjamin Franklin "Hawkeye" Pierce: Judd Hirsch - Taxi as Alex Reiger; Wilfrid Hyde-White - The Associates as Emerson Marshall; John Ritter - Three's Company as Jack Tripper; Robin Williams - Mork & Mindy as Mork	Linda Lavin - Alice as Alice Hyatt: Penny Marshall - Laverne & Shirley as Laverne DeFazio; Donna Pescow - Angie as Angie Falco; Jean Stapleton - All in the Family as Edith Bunker; Loretta Swit - M*A*S*H as Margaret "Hot Lips" Houlihan (Penobscott)
Best Supporting Performance in a Series, Miniseries or Television Film
Supporting Actor	Supporting Actress
Danny DeVito - Taxi as Louie De Palma (TIE) Vic Tayback - Alice as Mel Sharples (TIE): Jeff Conaway - Taxi as Bobby Wheeler; Andy Kaufman - Taxi as Latka Gravas; David Doyle - Charlie's Angels as John Bosley	Polly Holliday - Alice as Florence "Flo" Castleberry: Loni Anderson - WKRP in Cincinnati as Jennifer Marlowe; Marilu Henner - Taxi as Elaine O'Connor Nardo; Beth Howland - Alice as Vera Gorman Novak; Linda Kelsey - Lou Grant as Billie Newman
Best Miniseries or Television Film
All Quiet on the Western Front: Elvis; Friendly Fire; Like Normal People; The Miracle Worker

The following programs received multiple nominations:

Nominations	Title
6	Taxi
5	Alice
3	Lou Grant
3	M*A*S*H
2	Centennial
2	Dallas
2	Hart to Hart
2	The Rockford Files

The following programs received multiple wins:

Wins	Title
4	Alice
2	Lou Grant
2	Taxi

=== Cecil B. DeMille Award ===
Henry Fonda

== See also ==
- 52nd Academy Awards
- 31st Primetime Emmy Awards
- 32nd Primetime Emmy Awards
- 33rd British Academy Film Awards
- 34th Tony Awards
- 1979 in film
- 1979 in television
