= Melissa (Melissa Manchester album) =

- Melissa "Original Master Recording" vinyl album from Mobile Fidelity Sound Lab

Studio album by Melissa Manchester
- Released: February 1975
- Recorded: 1974
- Studio: Sunset Sound (Hollywood, California); A & R Recording (New York City, New York)
- Genre: Pop; R&B; soul
- Length: 39:34
- Label: Arista
- Producer: Vini Poncia

Melissa Manchester chronology
Bright Eyes (1974)	Melissa (1975)	Better Days & Happy Endings (1976)

Singles from Melissa
- 1. "Midnight Blue" Released: May 1975; 2. "Just Too Many People" Released: September 1975

Professional ratings
Review scores
Source	Rating
Christgau's Record Guide	B+

Melissa is the third album by Melissa Manchester, released on the Arista Records label in 1975. It reached #12 on the Billboard Albums chart on the strength of her first U.S. Top Ten hit "Midnight Blue" (#6). In 2001, the album was re-released.

== Track listing ==
All songs were written by Melissa Manchester and Carole Bayer Sager, unless stated otherwise.

No.	Title	Writer(s)	Length
1.	"We've Got Time"		4:24
2.	"Party Music"	Melissa Manchester; David Wolfert	3:29
3.	"Just Too Many People"	Manchester; Vini Poncia	3:38
4.	"Stevie's Wonder"		3:35
5.	"This Lady's Not Home Today"		4:33
6.	"Love Havin' You Around"	Stevie Wonder; Syreeta Wright	4:40
7.	"Midnight Blue"		3:55
8.	"It's Gonna Be Alright"	Manchester; Adrienne Anderson	3:34
9.	"I Got Eyes"	Manchester	2:45
10.	"I Don't Want to Hear It Anymore"	Randy Newman	5:05

== Personnel ==
- Melissa Manchester – lead vocals, acoustic piano (1–4, 7, 8, 10), string conductor (3, 10), electric piano (5, 9), clavinet (6)
- James Newton Howard – electric piano (1–4, 7), clavinet (2, 8), ARP synthesizer (2, 4, 9), organ (5, 6), acoustic piano (6), celesta (9)
- David Wolfert – acoustic guitar (1, 7, 8), electric guitars (1–7), guitars (8)
- John "Cooker" Lo Presti – bass
- Kirk Bruner – drums (1–8), percussion (2, 4), cuica (4), talking drum (6), backing vocals (9)
- King Errisson – congas (2, 5, 8)
- Don Diego Gujo – cowbell (8)
- Morton K. Salt – percussion (9)
- Trevor Lawrence – tenor saxophone (3, 6, 8), horn arrangements (3, 6, 8), string arrangements (3, 5, 7, 10), soprano saxophone (5), baritone saxophone (6, 8), alto saxophone (10)
- John Rotella – baritone saxophone (3)
- Gene Dinwiddie – tenor saxophone (6, 8)
- Lew McCreary – trombone (3)
- Steve Madaio – trumpet (3, 6, 8)
- Sid Sharp – concertmaster (10)
- Vini Poncia – backing vocals (1, 3, 7, 9)
- Lucy Mike – backing vocals (2)
- David Lasley – backing vocals (6)
- Arnold McCuller – backing vocals (6)
- Brie Howard – backing vocals (9)

=== Production ===
- Richard Perry – executive producer
- Vini Poncia – producer
- Bob Schaper – recording engineer, remixing (10)
- Bill Schnee – remixing (1–9) at Sound Labs (Hollywood, California)
- Reed Stanley – assistant engineer
- The Mastering Lab (Hollywood, California) – mastering location
- Bob Heimall – art direction
- Arton Associates – design
- Pacific Eye & Ear – illustration
- Ed Caraeff – photography
- Larry Brezner, Jack Rollins and Charles H. Joffe – management
