= Ice Castles (soundtrack) =

Ice Castles: Original Soundtrack Album

Soundtrack album by Marvin Hamlisch
- Released: 1979
- Genre: Soundtrack
- Length: 31:14
- Label: Arista Records
- Producer: Marvin Hamlisch

Professional ratings
Review scores
| Source | Rating |
|---|---|
| AllMusic | 3.0/5 stars |

Ice Castles is a soundtrack album that contains music from the 1978 romantic drama film Ice Castles. It was nominated for Best Album of Original Score Written for a Motion Picture or Television Special at the 22nd Annual Grammy Awards. "Through the Eyes of Love", performed by Melissa Manchester, was nominated for the Golden Globe Award for Best Original Song at the 37th Golden Globe Awards and for the Academy Award for Best Original Song at the 52nd Academy Awards.

== Track listing ==
All songs composed, conducted and produced by Marvin Hamlisch, unless otherwise noted.

| No. | Title | Writer(s) | Length |
|---|---|---|---|
| 1. | "Through the Eyes of Love (Theme from Ice Castles)" (sung by Melissa Manchester) | Marvin Hamlisch; Carole Bayer Sager | 4:15 |
| 2. | "They Threw Flowers" | | 4:20 |
| 3. | "Scarlotti Suite 1" | | 2:27 |
| 4. | "Deborah's Rock" | | 2:02 |
| 5. | "Theme from Ice Castles (Instrumental)" | Marvin Hamlisch; Carole Bayer Sager | 3:43 |
| 6. | "Voyager" (performed by The Alan Parsons Project, produced by Alan Parsons) | Alan Parsons; Eric Woolfson | 2:25 |
| 7. | "Touch" | | 3:49 |
| 8. | "Learning Again" | | 3:42 |
| 9. | "Finale" | | 4:31 |
| Total length: | | | 31:14 |
