= You Should Hear How She Talks About You =

- Side A of the U.S. single

Single by Melissa Manchester

from the album Hey Ricky
- B-side: "Long Goodbyes"
- Released: May 1982
- Genre: Pop rock; synth-pop
- Length: 4:17 (Album version); 3:40 (Single version)
- Label: Arista
- Songwriters: Dean Pitchford, Tom Snow
- Producer: Arif Mardin

Melissa Manchester singles chronology
"Race to the End" (1981)	"You Should Hear How She Talks About You" (1982)	"Hey Ricky (You're a Low-Down Heel)" (1982)

Audio
- "You Should Hear How She Talks About You" on YouTube

"You Should Hear How She Talks About You" is a song that was first recorded by Charlie Dore for her 1981 Listen! album. "You Should Hear How She Talks About You" was written by Dean Pitchford and Tom Snow. In 1982, Melissa Manchester took the song to number five in the U.S. to become her highest-charting record, a recording that went on to become number 18 for the year in 1982.

== Background ==
According to lyricist Pitchford, the song's lyrical concept was borrowed from "She Loves You" by the Beatles: "the idea of somebody reporting to somebody else on hearing this girl's in love with you, or this boy's in love with you." Pitchford and Snow had had that idea in mind for some time; then when Snow first played for Pitchford a new tune which had come to him, Pitchford felt: "this [could] be the song where we write our modern day 'She Loves You.'" Pitchford came up with the main hook line as "You should hear the way she talks about you" which Snow amended to "You should hear how she talks about you".

== Melissa Manchester recording ==
In 1982, American singer Melissa Manchester recorded it and included it on her album Hey Ricky. Her version of the song has a tempo of 133 beats per minute in common time. The verses are in the key of A minor, with the chorus moving a major second to B major. Manchester's vocals span from C_{4} to B_{4} in the song.

Arif Mardin who produced Manchester's recording described the track as "a real departure for Melissa because it has a new wave dance quality and she had been known for her ballads", Manchester having previously reached the top 10 of the U.S. Billboard Hot 100 with the ballads "Midnight Blue" and "Don't Cry Out Loud". Mardin continued: "But music is music. You can't turn your back on new formats or styles." A 1985 interview with Manchester would state that the singer "had to be dragged kicking and screaming into [the] studio to record...'You Should Hear How She Talks About You'."

The track would earn Manchester the Grammy Award for Best Female Pop Vocal Performance for the year 1982, besting nominated performances by superstars Linda Ronstadt and Olivia Newton-John as well as Juice Newton and Laura Branigan. Manchester had previously been nominated in that category for her 1979 top 10 hit "Don't Cry Out Loud".

In a 2012 interview Manchester would say of "You Should Hear How She Talks About You": "What was wonderful was that the song was written by two colleagues of mine, Tom Snow and Dean Pitchford. It's a solid song; but it was not the norm for me because I’m basically a troubadour. But I cut my hair off, lost lots of weight, glammed up, and ran it up the flagpole - and it worked! It worked all the way to a Grammy, which was kind of surprising. It was a lot of fun. I stopped singing it for awhile, because I needed a little perspective on it. But now I sing it again, and it’s kinda fun."

== Chart performance ==
"You Should Hear How She Talks About You" reached number five on the U.S. Billboard Hot 100 in September 1982 to become Manchester's highest-charting record. On the Cash Box chart, it spent six weeks at number four. The success enabled the song to rank at number 18 on the Hot 100's year-end chart for 1982. The song would also prove to be Manchester's last top-40 hit. The song also peaked at number 10 on the Adult Contemporary chart and number eight on the Dance/Disco Top 80 chart. "You Should Hear How She Talks About You" was also a worldwide hit in Canada (number five), New Zealand (number 20), and Australia (number four). In Australia, it ranked as the number-25 single of 1982.

== Personnel ==
- Melissa Manchester – lead vocals
- Robbie Buchanan – synthesizers, rhythm arrangements
- Larry Williams – alto saxophone
- Steve Lukather – guitar
- Abe Laboriel Sr. – bass guitar
- Jeff Porcaro – drums
- Millie Whiteside, Ula Hedwig, Will Lee – background vocals

== Charts ==
=== Weekly charts ===
Chart (1982)	Peak position
Australia (Kent Music Report)	4
Canada Top Singles (RPM)	5
Canada Adult Contemporary (RPM)	1
New Zealand (Recorded Music NZ)	20
U.S. Billboard Hot 100	5
U.S. Adult Contemporary (Billboard)	10
U.S. Dance/Disco Top 80 (Billboard)	8
U.S. Cash Box Top 100	4

=== Year-end charts ===
Chart (1982)	Rank
Australia (Kent Music Report)	25
U.S. Billboard Hot 100	18
U.S. Cash Box Top 100	25
