= Ice Castles =

1978 film by Donald Wrye

- Theatrical release poster
- Directed by: Donald Wrye
- Screenplay by: Donald Wrye; Gary L. Baim
- Story by: Gary L. Baim
- Produced by: John Kemeny
- Starring: Robby Benson; Colleen Dewhurst; Tom Skerritt; Jennifer Warren; David Huffman; Lynn-Holly Johnson
- Cinematography: Bill Butler
- Edited by: Michael Kahn; Maury Winetrobe; Melvin Shapiro
- Music by: Marvin Hamlisch
- Distributed by: Columbia Pictures
- Release dates: December 14, 1978 (Minneapolis); December 22, 1978 (United States)
- Running time: 110 minutes
- Country: United States
- Language: English
- Box office: $18 million

Ice Castles is a 1978 American romantic sports drama film directed by Donald Wrye and starring Lynn-Holly Johnson, Robby Benson, Colleen Dewhurst, Tom Skerritt, and Jennifer Warren. It follows Lexie Winston, a young figure skater, and her rise and fall from super stardom alongside her boyfriend, an aspiring professional ice hockey player. Tragedy strikes when, following a freak accident, Lexie loses her sight, leaving her to hide away in the privacy of her own despair. She eventually perseveres and begins competing in figure skating again.

The film was shot on location in Colorado and Minnesota. Its theme song "Through the Eyes of Love", performed by Melissa Manchester, was nominated for the Academy Award for Best Original Song at the 52nd Academy Awards.

A remake, also directed by Wrye, was released direct to video in 2010.

== Plot ==
Alexis "Lexie" Winston is a sixteen-year-old girl from Waverly, Iowa, who dreams of becoming a champion figure skater. Her boyfriend, Nick Peterson, dreams of becoming a hockey player.

Coached by a family friend and former skater Beulah Smith, Lexie enters a regional championship over her father's protests. She is discovered there by elite coach Deborah Mackland, who sees her potential despite her lack of training and her relatively advanced age. Over her father Marcus Winston's protests, Lexie moves from Waverly to Colorado Springs to train at the legendary Broadmoor World Arena. She becomes unpopular among her fellow trainees because of the attention lavished on her natural talent and the publicity she receives.

Lexie qualifies for the senior championship level, her life changing drastically in the process. She becomes a star, alienates Nick, and begins dating a grown man, television broadcaster Brian Dockett. Becoming uncomfortable with the direction her life is taking, she leaves a sponsorship party and heads to a nearby outdoor skating rink. Deborah and the partygoers watch through the windows as she skates. She attempts a difficult triple jump, but lands off the ice onto a set of tables and chairs chained together near the edge of the rink. Lexie suffers a serious head injury, a blood clot in her brain damaging her eyesight and leaving her able to see only light and blurry shapes. The doctor is uncertain if her injury will be permanent.

Lexie returns home and becomes a recluse. Nick, who still resents her affair with Brian, demands that she get out of the house and back onto the ice. Despite their mutual resentment and Lexie's depression, they work through their estrangement and rediscover their love for each other. With help from Nick, Marcus, and Beulah, Lexie starts believing that she can still fulfill her dreams. Though virtually blind, she can still see the boards at the edge of the rink, and so learns how to compensate for her disability.

She enrolls in the sectional championship and presents a flawless program that provokes a standing ovation from the audience. Her disability, however, is revealed when she trips over roses thrown onto the ice by adoring fans. Nick rushes to her side and says, "We forgot about the flowers", as the crowd realizes that Lexie has not recovered from her injuries, but rather risen above them.

== Cast ==
- Lynn-Holly Johnson as Alexis "Lexie" Winston
- Robby Benson as Nick Peterson
- Colleen Dewhurst as Beulah Smith
- Tom Skerritt as Marcus Winston
- Jennifer Warren as Deborah Mackland
- David Huffman as Brian Dockett
- Sydney Blake as Sandy
- Craig T. McMullen as Doctor
- Kelsey Ufford as Ceciel Monchet
- Leonard Lilyholm as Hockey Coach
- Brian Foley as Choreographer
- John-Claude Bleuze as French Coach
- Theresa Willmus as Annette Brashlout
- Diana Holden as X-Ray Technician
- Michelle McLean as Skater
- Carol Williams as Television Producer

== Production ==
=== Casting ===
The film marked the debut of Lynn-Holly Johnson, a teenage figure skater who won the silver medal in the U.S. Figure Skating Championship's novice division. After suffering a leg injury, she returned to the sport as a featured skater with the Ice Capades. Originally, the filmmakers intended to cast a known actress in the role and use a double for the skating scenes, but ultimately decided to search for a trained skater with acting potential.

Robby Benson, who was cast opposite Johnson, had no skating experience. To prepare for the role, he trained with the National Hockey League (NHL) teams the New York Islanders and Minnesota North Stars. Additionally, Benson trained with NHL coach Barbara Williams and former skating champion Richard Vraa.

=== Filming ===
Principal photography of Ice Castles began in March 1978, beginning in Minneapolis. After six to eight weeks, the production moved to the Broadmoor World Arena in Colorado Springs, Colorado, an actual Olympic training facility. Additional photography took place in the Denver area.

According to cinematography Bill Butler, he and director Donald Wrye avoided using special lighting effects during both the arena and outdoor sequences, opting to rely on natural light. They also utilized special dollies and wide-angle lenses to capture the skaters' movements.

== Release ==
Ice Castles was released by Columbia Pictures in the United States, with its world premiere taking place on December 14, 1978 in Minneapolis to benefit the U.S. Figure Skating and local hockey organizations. It was released in nine select cities on December 22, 1978, before its release expanded nationwide.

== Reception ==
=== Box office ===
The film earned $365,000 during the first eleven days of its limited engagements across nine U.S. cities. It went on to earn approximately $18 million at the United States box office.

=== Critical response ===
The film holds a 44% "Rotten" rating on aggregate review site Rotten Tomatoes, based on 9 reviews, with an average score of 5.3/10.

A movie reviewer for Variety wrote, "Ice Castles combines a touching love story with the excitement and intense pressure of Olympic competition skating" and praised the performances of Colleen Dewhurst and Tom Skerritt.

Roger Ebert disliked the sentimentality of the movie, writing:

Call me Scrooge; stories like this make me cringe. I don't deny the bravery of the characters being portrayed – I just object to the emotional bankruptcy of the people making the movies ... One of the melancholy aspects of Ice Castles is the quality of talent that's been brought to such an unhappy enterprise. Lynn-Holly Johnson, who plays the figure skater, is an appealing young woman who actually happens to be a good skater who can act. Robby Benson, as her boy friend, is always an engaging performer ... The supporting cast includes the irreplaceable Colleen Dewhurst ... There's also a brief role (as a hard-boiled coach) for the fascinating actress Jennifer Warren, who was electrifying in Night Moves and never seems to get the roles she deserves. They all act well together, and the direction by Donald Wrye tries to get beneath surfaces, to show plausible people in actual situations, to give some notion of the pressures on young athletes. The girl's small town is colorfully painted, the family's home life is drawn in a nice offbeat way, and the details of competitive ice-skating are worked in casually.

Austin Kennedy also gave a mediocre review, though praised the acting as "the better part of this movie. Real life skater Lynn-Holly Johnson is charming and does a fine job as the innocent starlet."

Common Sense Media called the film a "schmaltzy classic skating movie for romantics."

Janet Maslin, in The New York Times, stated that she found the movie "amazingly hard to follow", "confusing", and "baffling". She wrote, "Wrye's bungling renders the story sob-proof."

== Accolades ==
Award	Year	Category	Recipients	Result	Ref.
Academy Awards	1979	Best Original Song	"Through the Eyes of Love (Theme from Ice Castles)"; Music by Marvin Hamlisch; Lyrics by Carole Bayer Sager	Nominated	
American Movie Awards	1979	Best Supporting Actress	Colleen Dewhurst	Nominated	
Golden Globe Awards	1979	Best Original Song – Motion Picture	"Through the Eyes of Love (Theme from Ice Castles)"; Music by Marvin Hamlisch; Lyrics by Carole Bayer Sager	Nominated	
Golden Globe Awards	1979	New Star of the Year in a Motion Picture – Female	Lynn-Holly Johnson	Nominated	
Golden Reel Awards	1979	Best Sound Editing – Dialogue		Won	
Grammy Awards	1980	Best Album of Original Score Written for a Motion Picture or a Television Special	Ice Castles – Marvin Hamlisch, Carole Bayer Sager, Alan Parsons and Eric Woolfson	Nominated	
Stinkers Bad Movie Awards	1979	Worst Supporting Actress	Colleen Dewhurst	Nominated	

== Remake ==
Director Donald Wrye remade Ice Castles in 2009. The namesake film, starring Taylor Firth and Rob Mayes, was released as a direct-to-DVD title on February 9, 2010, shortly before the 2010 Winter Olympics.

== See also ==
- Ice Castles (soundtrack)
- List of sports films
