= Don't Cry Out Loud (song) =

1976 song written by Peter Allen and Carole Bayer Sager

"We Don't Cry Out Loud"

Single by The Moments

from the album Moments with You
- B-side: "Come In Girl"
- Released: December 1976
- Recorded: 1976
- Genre: Soul
- Length: 3:56
- Label: Stang
- Songwriters: Peter Allen, Carole Bayer Sager
- Producer: Sylvia Robinson

The Moments singles chronology
"With You" (1976)	"We Don't Cry Out Loud" (1976)	"I Don't Wanna Go" (1977)

"Don't Cry Out Loud" is a song written in 1976 by Peter Allen with lyricist Carole Bayer Sager. It later became a hit single for Melissa Manchester in the US and for Elkie Brooks in the UK.

== Background and first recordings ==
Ann-Margret, who was a friend of Peter Allen, has stated that the song's lyrics—though written by Carole Bayer Sager—reflect Allen's own frame of mind: "He just kept everything inside [...] his personal philosophy was 'Don't show anyone you're crying.'" Bernadette Peters, who toured with Allen in 1989, has stated that Allen told her that "his mother taught him to always put your best face on" in response to Allen's father dying by suicide when Allen was 14 years old. The references to "baby" in the song refer to Allen's younger sister.

The first evident recording of the song is by The Moments as "We Don't Cry Out Loud", track-produced by Sylvia Robinson, and given a December 1976 release simultaneous with its parent album Moments with You. "We Don't Cry Out Loud" was the second of three consecutive single releases by the Moments, which were co-written by Carole Bayer Sager. The first and third of these singles: "With You" and "I Don't Wanna Go" were both top 20 R&B hits but "We Don't Cry Out Loud" rose no higher than number 79 on the chart.

Peter Allen himself included a version of the song on his 1977 live album It Is Time for Peter Allen, with the track having a December 1977 single release. Allen's studio recording of his song was introduced on his 1979 album release I Could Have Been a Sailor. Allen also included "Don't Cry Out Loud" on the 1985 live album Captured Live at Carnegie Hall.

== Melissa Manchester version ==
"Don't Cry Out Loud"

Single by Melissa Manchester

from the album Don't Cry Out Loud
- B-side: "We Had This Time"
- Released: October 11, 1978
- Recorded: 1977
- Studio: Allen Zentz Studios (Los Angeles, CA)
- Genre: Pop
- Length: 3:36
- Label: Arista
- Songwriters: Peter Allen; Carole Bayer Sager
- Producer: Harry Maslin

Melissa Manchester singles chronology
"I Wanna Be Where You Are" (1977)	"Don't Cry Out Loud" (1978)	"Theme from Ice Castles" (1979)

Music video
- "Don't Cry Out Loud" on YouTube

According to Arista Records president Clive Davis, Melissa Manchester recorded "Don't Cry Out Loud" at his strong suggestion as Davis felt that Manchester's intended 1979 album release lacked a potential top 40 comeback hit. Davis assigned production of the track to Harry Maslin, who had co-produced the David Bowie albums Young Americans and Station to Station and whose most recent production work had been with Arista's Bay City Rollers. Although Manchester herself regularly collaborated with lyricist Carole Bayer Sager—their output including Manchester's sole (to that point) top ten hit "Midnight Blue"—Harry Maslin recalled that Manchester "hated the song 'Don't Cry Out Loud' and was angry with me for doing it [i.e. producing Manchester's recording]"; "I think that's why I got such a wonderful vocal out of her".

In a 2015 interview Manchester stated: "[Clive Davis] remembers history his way and I remember history my way. He remembers bringing me 'Don’t Cry Out Loud'. I remember being friends with Peter Allen and Carole Bayer Sager and hearing 'Don’t Cry Out Loud' as a very quiet song, bringing it to him and saying yes, it's gorgeous, let's do it the way Peter did it—as beautiful and quiet. [Then] I showed up in the studio and the cannons blew on this huge version—which turned out beautifully, it turned out as a gift."

Manchester conceded reservations about the song's theme, saying in 2004: "I finally understand what it meant [...] I [originally] thought it was a brilliant song but it seemed like the antithesis of everything Carole [Bayer Sager] and I were writing which was always about self-affirmation and crying out and sharpening your communication skills. But it's a beautifully crafted song that was all about how in the end you just have to learn to cope—and that's no easy thing."

Recorded at Allen Zentz Studios Hollywood, "Don't Cry Out Loud" was released 11 October 1978 and did indeed reach the top 40 at the end of 1978, rising to a number 10 peak on the Billboard Hot 100 twenty weeks later in March 1979. The single also reached number 9 on the Adult Contemporary chart, and thanks to its long chart life on the Hot 100, was ranked as Billboard′s 26th biggest hit of 1979, ranking ahead of a number of songs that reached higher (but shorter) peaks on the weekly surveys (including Sister Sledge's "We Are Family" and the Bee Gees' number-one hit "Love You Inside Out").

=== Personnel ===
- Melissa Manchester – lead vocals
- Bill Payne – acoustic piano
- Lee Ritenour – guitar
- Dennis Budimir – guitar
- David Hungate – bass
- Jim Keltner – drums
- Barry Fasman – arrangements
- Harry Bluestone – concertmaster
- Frank DeCaro – conductor

=== Chart performance ===
==== Weekly charts ====
Chart (1979)	Peak position
Canada Top Singles (RPM)	9
Canada RPM Adult Contemporary	2
US Billboard Hot 100	10
US Billboard Adult Contemporary	9
US Cash Box Top 100	10

==== Year-end charts ====
Chart (1979)	Rank
Canada	45
US Billboard Hot 100	26
US Cash Box	71

=== Later uses ===
Manchester's version has been lip-synced to comic effect; once in Drop Dead Gorgeous, a 1999 dark comedy, and later in a May 2013 episode of Late Night with Jimmy Fallon, as part of a "Lip-Sync Off" with John Krasinski.

The song was heavily featured in Schitt's Creek.

The song was interpolated into the 4 Non Blondes song "What's Up?" in a 2005 viral video called "Fabulous Secret Powers".

== Elkie Brooks version ==
"Don't Cry Out Loud"

Single by Elkie Brooks

from the album Pearls
- B-side: "Got to Be a Winner"
- Released: 26 October 1978
- Genre: Pop
- Length: 3:52
- Label: A&M
- Songwriters: Peter Allen, Carole Bayer Sager
- Producer: Gus Dudgeon

Elkie Brooks singles chronology
"Since You Went Away" (1978)	"Don't Cry Out Loud" (1978)	"The Runaway" (1979)

Elkie Brooks released a version of the song for the UK market with Gus Dudgeon producing. Brooks' "Don't Cry Out Loud" reached its number 12 peak on the UK top 50 dated 16 December 1978—two weeks before Manchester's version reached the US Top 40— and was also a hit in Ireland (number 14). Brooks' "Don't Cry Out Loud" was not featured on her 1979 studio album Live and Learn, instead making a belated debut as an album track on Brook's all time bestseller Pearls released in 1981. The song later served as the title track for Brooks' 2005 live album release cut in 2004. In 2009, Brooks stated: "Many years ago I was persuaded to do a lot of songs I wasn't particularly keen on. 'Don't Cry Out Loud' was one of them—but over the years I have [grown] to like it!".

=== Personnel ===
- Elkie Brooks – vocals
- Tim Hinkley – piano/keyboards
- Jerry Friedmen, Eric Weissberg, Geoff Whitehorn – guitar
- Jeremy Meek – bass guitar
- Graham Jarvis – drums
- Bruce Baxter – arrangement

== Other versions ==
"Don't Cry Out Loud"

Single by Diana DeGarmo

from the album Blue Skies
- A-side: "Dreams"
- B-side: Don't Cry Out Loud, I Believe
- Released: 29 June 2004
- Recorded: May 2004
- Genre: Pop
- Length: 3:44
- Label: RCA Records
- Songwriters: Peter Allen, Carole Bayer Sager
- Producer: Stephen Ferrera

Diana DeGarmo singles chronology
"Dreams"/"Don't Cry Out Loud" / "Don't Cry Out Loud"/"I Believe" (2004)	"Emotional" (2004)

Rita Coolidge's performance of "Don't Cry Out Loud" took the Grand Prize at the Tokyo Music Festival held on June 17, 1979, with Coolidge's compilation album featuring the track and becoming a top 20 Japanese bestseller that summer.

"Don't Cry Out Loud" was recorded by American Idol Season 3 runner-up Diana DeGarmo for inclusion on her 2004 single release helmed by the track "Dreams"; Clive Davis selected "Don't Cry Out Loud" for DeGarmo to sing and Melissa Manchester attended DeGarmo's recording session giving DeGarmo pointers on how to sing the song.

Liza Minnelli—Peter Allen's ex-wife—sings "Don't Cry Out Loud" on her 2002 album Liza's Back, which was recorded from a seven-night engagement at the Beacon Theatre in New York City that June. Minnelli sets the song in a sequence of "crying" songs with "Don't Cry Out Loud" performed between "Cry" and "Crying": Minnelli's rendition features only the first verse of "Don't Cry Out Loud" and amends the lyrics of the chorus to invert their original import ("Cry out loud, don't keep it inside. Don't learn how to hide your feelings.")

Miss America 1980 Cheryl Prewitt—Miss Mississippi 1979—sang "Don't Cry Out Loud" to her own piano accompaniment in the talent competition of the Miss America Pageant broadcast on NBC 9 September 1979 from Convention Hall in Atlantic City.
