= Weekly =

Weekly refers to a repeating event happening once a week

Weekly, The Weekly, or variations, may also refer to:

== News media ==
- Weekly (news magazine), an English-language national news magazine published in Mauritius
- Weekly newspaper, any newspaper published on a weekly schedule
- Alternative newspaper, also known as alternative weekly, a newspaper with magazine-style feature stories
- The Weekly with Charlie Pickering, an Australian satirical news program
- The Weekly with Wendy Mesley, a Canadian Sunday morning news talk show
- The Weekly, the original name of the television documentary series The New York Times Presents
- Carlton Dequan Weekly-Williams known professionally as FBG Duck American rapper, songwriter.

== See also ==
- Frequency
- Once a week (disambiguation)
- Weekley, a village in Northamptonshire, UK
- Weeekly, a South Korean girl-group
- Weekly News (disambiguation)
- Weekley (surname)
