= Weekly News (disambiguation) =

The Weekly News was a British national newspaper published from 1855 to 2020.

The Weekly News was also a Florida LGBTQ newspaper published from 1977 to 2006.

Weekly News, a title given to a newspaper that is published on a weekly basis, may refer to:

== Australia ==
- Guyra Weekly News, New South Wales

== Turks and Caicos Islands ==
- Turks and Caicos Weekly News

== United Kingdom ==
- Fleetwood Weekly News, in Fleetwood, Lancashire
- Manchester Weekly News
- Newbury Weekly News, in Newbury and West Berkshire
- North Wales Weekly News, in North Wales
- Pulman's Weekly News
- Strabane Weekly News and Tyrone & Donegal Reporter, in Strabane, Northern Ireland
- Wellington Weekly News, in Wellington, Somerset

== United States ==
- Austin Weekly News, Texas
- Seattle Weekly News, Washington
- SoHo Weekly News, New York
- Weekly World News, a supermarket tabloid newspaper

== Online ==
- Linux Weekly News, now LWN.net, a computing webzine
