= Tenterfield Intercolonial Courier and Fairfield and Wallangarra Advocate =

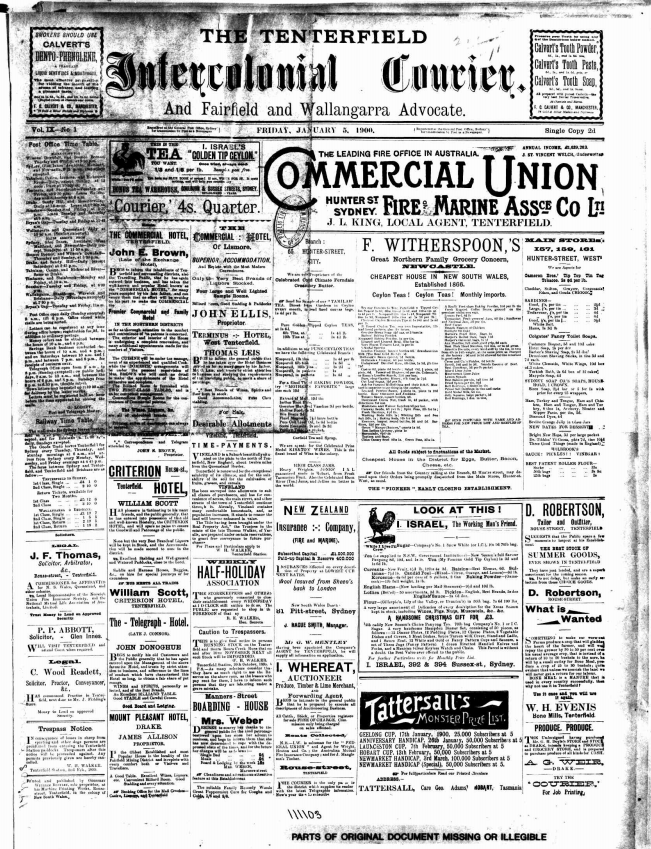
The Tenterfield Intercolonial Courier and Fairfield and Wallangarra Advocate

The Tenterfield Intercolonial Courier and Fairfield and Wallangarra Advocate was a newspaper published in Tenterfield, New South Wales, Australia from 1891 to 1914. It was also published as the International Courier and continued by the Tenterfield Courier and District Advocate.

== History ==
The Tenterfield Intercolonial Courier and Fairfield and Wallangarra Advocate was first published in 1891 by Geoffrey William Bentley. The newspaper was a Broadsheet bi-weekly and circulated every Tuesday and Friday. Priced at two pennies, it was four pages long, with 7 columns across each page. Dominating the front page was an array of product and service advertisements; however, the Post Office timetable flanked the left side. Local news began on the second page and was followed by wider national and international news. This encompassed events occurring in Sydney and Queensland, to correspondence from London about the Transvaal War or the Second Boer War.

In February 1914, the publication became the Tenterfield Courier and District Advocate when Gordon Cumming Stevenson took over ownership.

== Digitisation ==
The paper has been digitised as part of the Australian Newspapers Digitisation Program project of the National Library of Australia.

== See also ==
- List of newspapers in Australia
- List of newspapers in New South Wales
