= Guyra Argus =

Australian newspaper

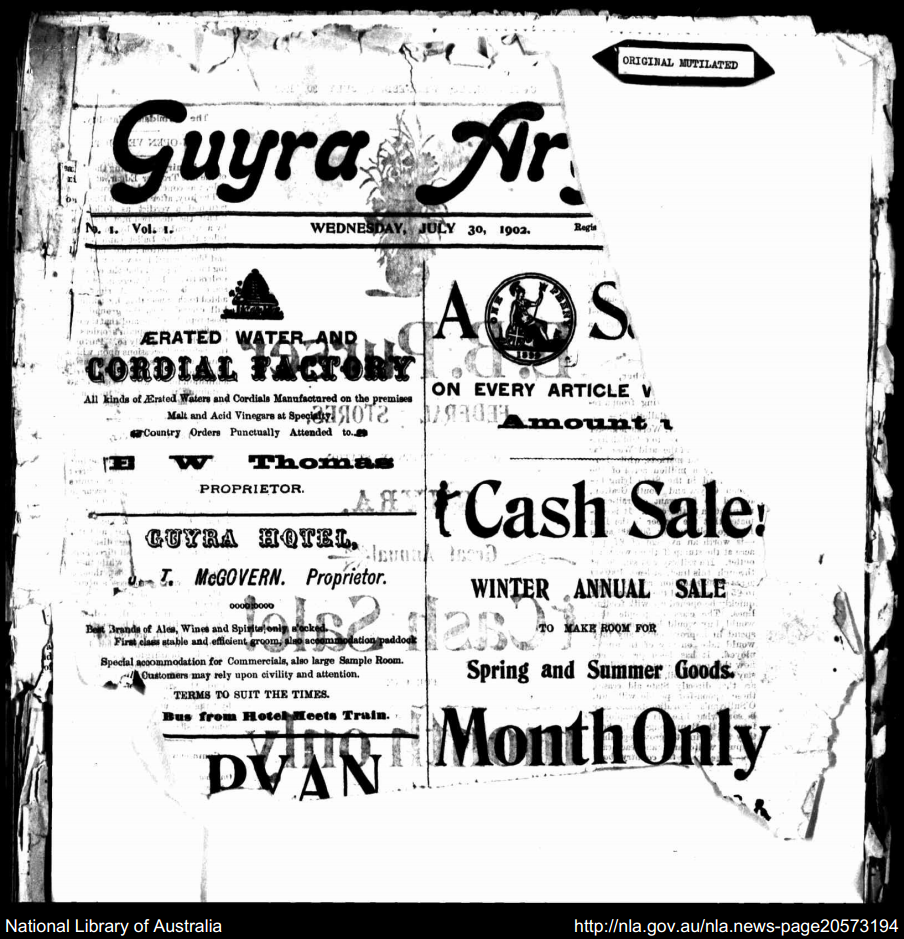
- Front cover of the Guyra Argus on 30 July 1902
- Type: Weekly newspaper
- Founder: Albert Michael Roche
- Publisher: Fairfax Media
- Founded: 1902
- Language: English
- Headquarters: Guyra, New South Wales
- Country: Australia
- Circulation: 800
- ISSN: 1321-5396
- Website: guyraargus.com.au

The Guyra Argus is an English-language newspaper published weekly in Guyra, New South Wales.

== History ==
The Guyra Argus was first published in 1902 by Albert Michael Roche and was published under this title until 1957. The newspaper reappeared under various other names, including the Guyra Guardian from 1959 to 1983, when it was bought by Rural Press Ltd and incorporated into the Tablelands Times. A local community newspaper, called the Guyra Shire Chronicle, followed from 1983 to 1988. After this closed, a series of community meetings were held to determine the future of the newspaper and Geoffrey and Margaret Hovey, who had previously owned The Tenterfield Star were asked to launch a newspaper; they began publishing the Guyra Weekly News in 1989 and it remained in publication until 1992. Publication recommenced under the Guyra Argus masthead in 1993.

== Digitisation ==
The earlier edition of the Argus has been digitised as part of the Australian Newspapers Digitisation Program project of the National Library of Australia.

== See also ==
- List of newspapers in New South Wales
