= Tenterfield Post Office =

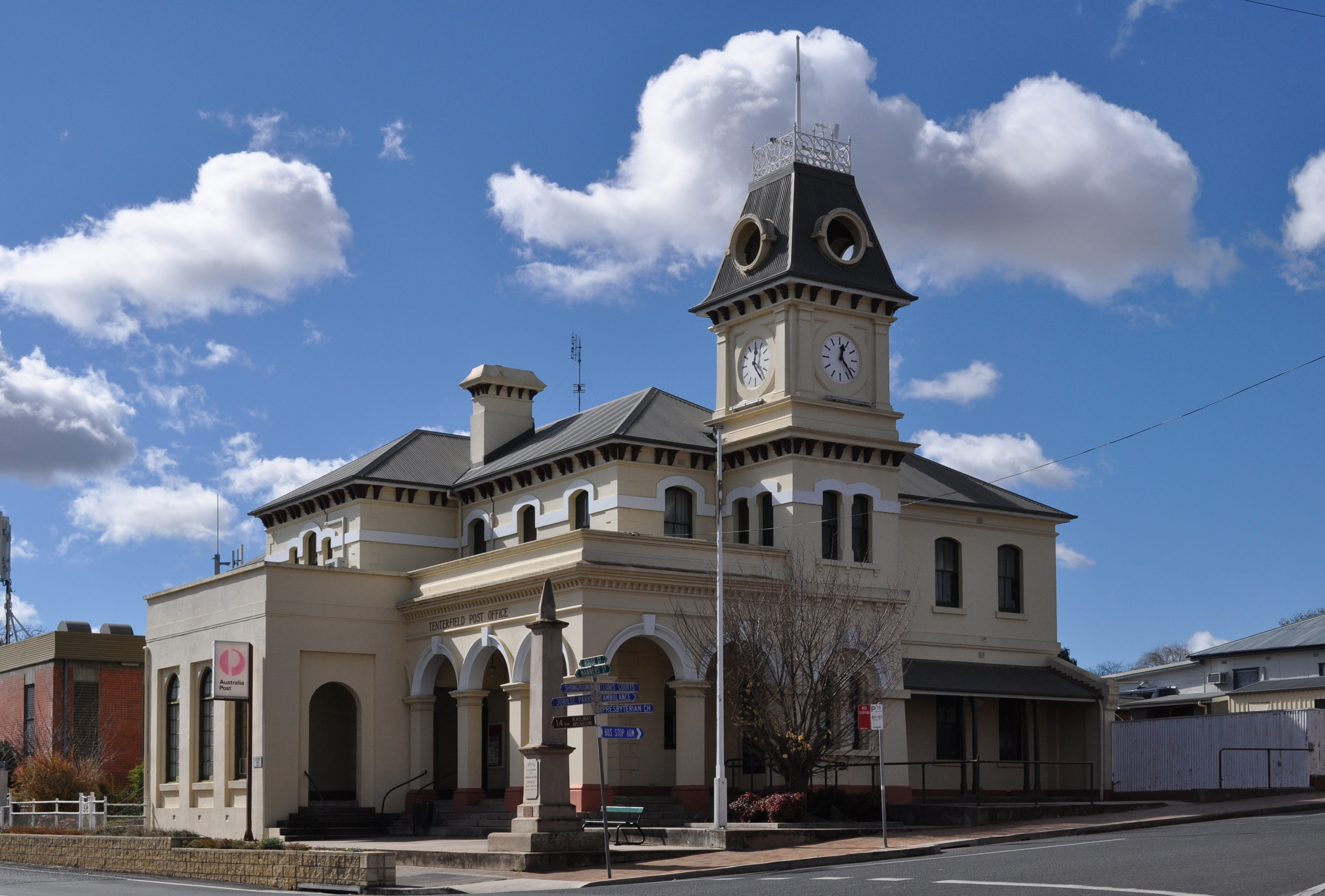
- The Tenterfield Post Office, June 2010

- Location within New South Wales Location within Australia
- 29°03′19″S 152°01′09″E
- Location: 225 Rouse Street, Tenterfield, Tenterfield Shire, New South Wales, Australia

History
- Built: 1881–

Site notes
- Architect: NSW Colonial Architect's Office under James Barnet
- Architectural styles: Victorian Italianate; Victorian Second Empire
- Owner: Australia Post

New South Wales Heritage Register
- Official name: Tenterfield Post Office & Quarters
- Type: State heritage (built)
- Designated: 17 December 1999
- Reference no.: 1315
- Type: Post Office
- Category: Postal and Telecommunications
- Builders: T. & J. McGuaran; T. A. Lewis

The Tenterfield Post Office is a heritage-listed post office located at 225 Rouse Street, Tenterfield, Tenterfield Shire, New South Wales, Australia. It was designed by NSW Colonial Architect's Office under James Barnet and built from 1881 to by T. & J. McGuaran, later T. A. Lewis. It is also known as the Tenterfield Post Office and Quarters. The property is owned by Australia Post. It was added to the New South Wales State Heritage Register on 17 December 1999.

== History ==
The first official postal in Tenterfield was established on 1 January 1849, and has been operated by numerous people in a variety of premises since that time. The significance of Tenterfield in the post and telegraph system was limited, however, until 1861 when it was established as the last repeating station between Sydney and Brisbane. In 1876 tenders were called for construction of a new building adjacent to the then Post and Telegraph Office. However, this appears to have been abandoned and the present site purchased instead, with fresh tenders called in 1878. The building was not opened until 1881 and the clock was completed in 1891–92. Extensive repairs were carried out in 1894–1895.

== Description ==
A two-storey stuccoed Victorian Italianate post office with single-storey parapeted colonnade and three-storey clock tower with Victorian Second Empire mansard roof. The colonnade has arched openings with drip moulds and rendered keystones, and the parapet has a deep entablature with detail moulding. A front extension continues the theme of the colonnade, but in a more austere manner. The upper floor windows are segmentally arched, with a deep string course, and there are paired brackets to the eaves of the hipped corrugated iron roof. The clock tower has Tuscan corner pilasters to the third level and features clock faces to all sides. The steep mansard roof has a widow's walk with cast iron balustrade, and large ocular vents to each face. The Quarters are entered from the side street through a skillion-roofed timber verandah with paired posts.

=== Condition ===
As at 1 December 1999 the physical condition was good.

=== Modifications and dates ===
Extensive repairs were carried out in 1894–1895. The date of the addition to the Rouse Street facade is not known.

== Heritage listing ==
As at 10 December 1999, the Tenterfield Post Office and Quarters was important at the State level as a substantial Italianate public building with corner tower, representative of the work of the Colonial Architect's Office under the direction of James Barnet. Its picturesque massing and French Second Empire influence are important elements the, design of the tower roof comparing with Forbes (1881). It is one of the grandest and most prominent buildings in Tenterfield and an intrinsic part of the towns social history. It forms part of a group which includes the School of Arts, a hotel and several shops.

Tenterfield Post Office was listed on the New South Wales State Heritage Register on 17 December 1999 having satisfied the following criteria.

The place is important in demonstrating the course, or pattern, of cultural or natural history in New South Wales.

Significant as the last repeating station in the post and telegraph system between Sydney and Brisbane (established in 1861).

Representative of the work of James Barnet, Colonial Architect.

The place is important in demonstrating aesthetic characteristics and/or a high degree of creative or technical achievement in New South Wales.

The Tenterfield Post Office and Quarters is a substantial Victorian Italianate building with some Second Empire style elements.

It is one of the grandest buildings in Tenterfield. The picturesque massing and corner tower have landmark qualities. The Post Office forms part of a group, which includes the School of Arts, a hotel and several shops.

The place has a strong or special association with a particular community or cultural group in New South Wales for social, cultural or spiritual reasons.

An intrinsic part of the town's social history, the Post Office is considered to be significant to the Tenterfield community's sense of place.

The place has potential to yield information that will contribute to an understanding of the cultural or natural history of New South Wales.

The site has the potential to contain an archaeological resource, which may provide information relating to the previous use of the site, and to the use by the Post Office.

The place possesses uncommon, rare or endangered aspects of the cultural or natural history of New South Wales.

Not assessed as being rare.

The place is important in demonstrating the principal characteristics of a class of cultural or natural places/environments in New South Wales.

The Tenterfield Post Office and Quarters is representative of the Victorian Italianate and Second Empire styles. It is also representative of the work of Colonial Architect James Barnet.

Representative of the group of NSW post offices.
