= The Weekly News (LGBTQ) =

LGBTQ newspaper in Miami, Florida (1977–2006)

- Type: Weekly LGBT newspaper
- Format: Tabloid
- Founded: 1977
- Ceased publication: 2006
- Headquarters: Miami, Florida, US
- Circulation: 32,000 (as of 1986)

The Weekly News (TWN) was a weekly newspaper serving the LGBTQ community in South Florida. It was published from 1977 to 2006.

== Background ==
In January 1977, the Dade County Commission passed an ordinance forbidding discrimination against homosexual people in employment, housing, and public services. A coalition called Save Our Children, headed by singer Anita Bryant, successfully lobbied to overturn the ordinance.

== History ==
TWN was founded in August 1977 by volunteers opposing Save Our Children's campaign. It was part of an explosion in LGBT newspapers in the later part of the 20th century. It was initially published by the Dade County Coalition for Human Rights (DCCHR). The first editor-in-chief was Paul Guiles. Among its early work was a boycott campaign against Florida Citrus due to its hiring of Bryant as a spokesperson, along with other DCCHR campaigns. It also hosted monthly meetings of the Gay Teen Task Force.

TWN became an independent non-profit in 1980, with Bill Watson as publisher. It was published in conjunction with Contax, which covered the Florida gay social scene. During this period, it underwent a "transformation from a traditional newspaper format into a trendy-looking periodical".

Joseph McQuay was hired as the editor in 1982. In the same year, the Gay Teen Task Force moved to Miami Dade College. In the early 1980s, TWN reported on police harassment of patrons at gay bars and discrimination by the Florida Bar against gay applicants. It also ran film and travel columns, and a book review column which was later syndicated.

A 1986 story in the Boston Globe stated that "in Miami, no group uses 'lesbian' or 'gay' in titles"; it quotes McQuay as attributing the paper's survival to its generic name.

In 1986, BellSouth Advertising & Publishing refused a yellow pages listing for TWN that identified it as a "gay" newspaper. The paper had had listings for the previous two years. A spokesman for BellSouth stated that "we're going to have little kids and people from another generation who can't stomach two men sleeping with each other picking up our directory, and these are the people we are thinking about."

Cliff O'Neill was named editor in 1987. Writers included activist and author Jack Nichols.

== Circulation and readership ==
TWN was a weekly tabloid newspaper. As of 1986, the paper had a circulation of 32,000. In 1988, the average reader was a man earning $35,000 annually (equivalent to $95,280 in 2025). In 1991, the readership was primarily white and more educated than the general population of the area.

The publication was a member of the National Gay Newspaper Guild. It circulated in Miami-Dade and Broward counties through businesses and lavender-colored news boxes.

== Legacy ==
TWN was Florida's "pioneer newspaper for LGBTQ rights". By the time of its last issue, published in 2006, TWN had become the longest-running LGBT newspaper in Florida. It was surpassed by Hotspots! in 2015.

An almost-complete run of the paper is held by the Stonewall National Museum and Archives, with smaller collections at other centers, including the University of Florida and the Lesbian, Gay, Bisexual & Transgender Community Center. Issues from 2003 to 2006 are indexed by EBSCO Information Services's LGBTQ+ Source database.
