= Tenterfield, New South Wales =

Tenterfield
- Town
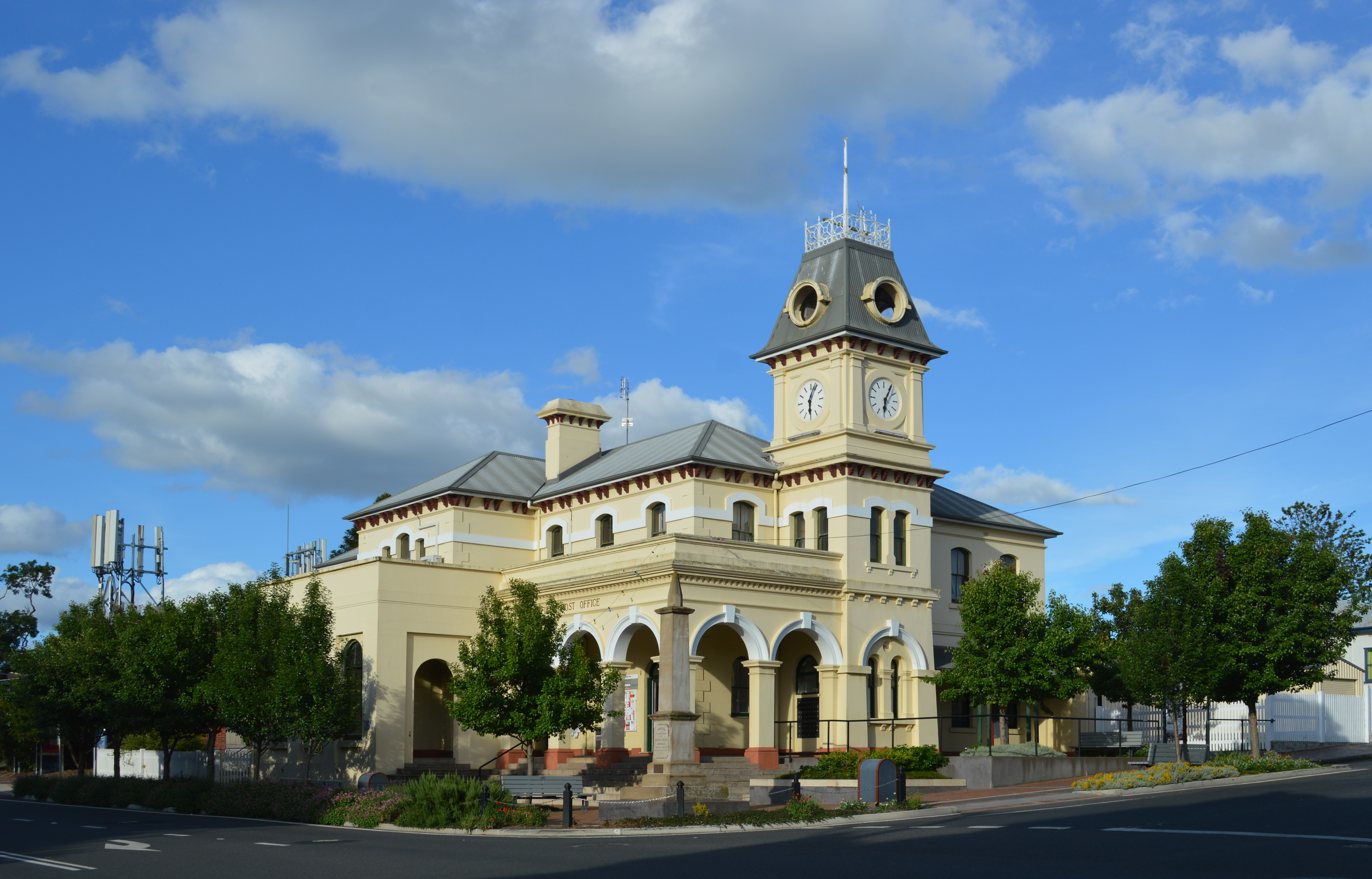
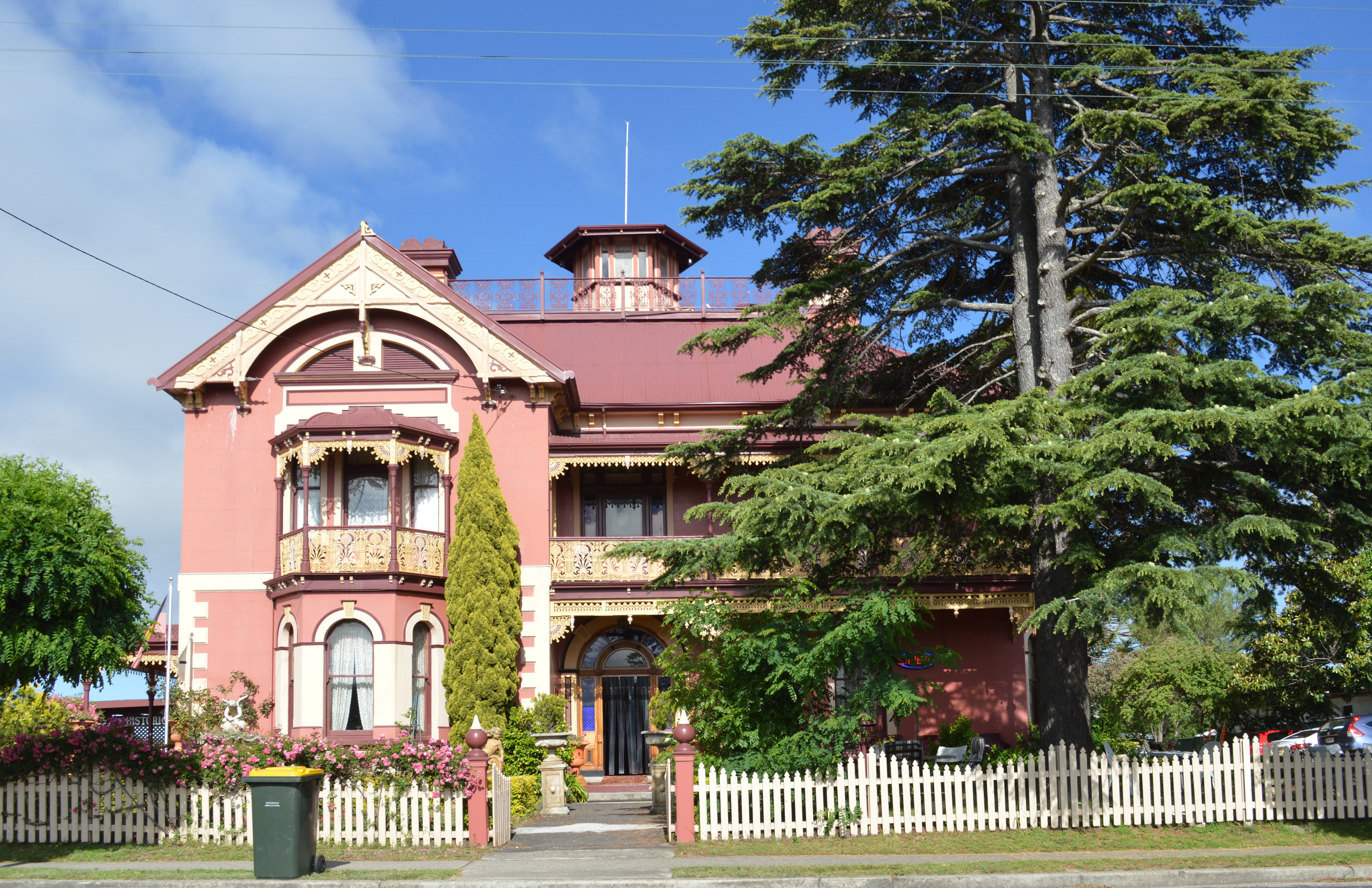
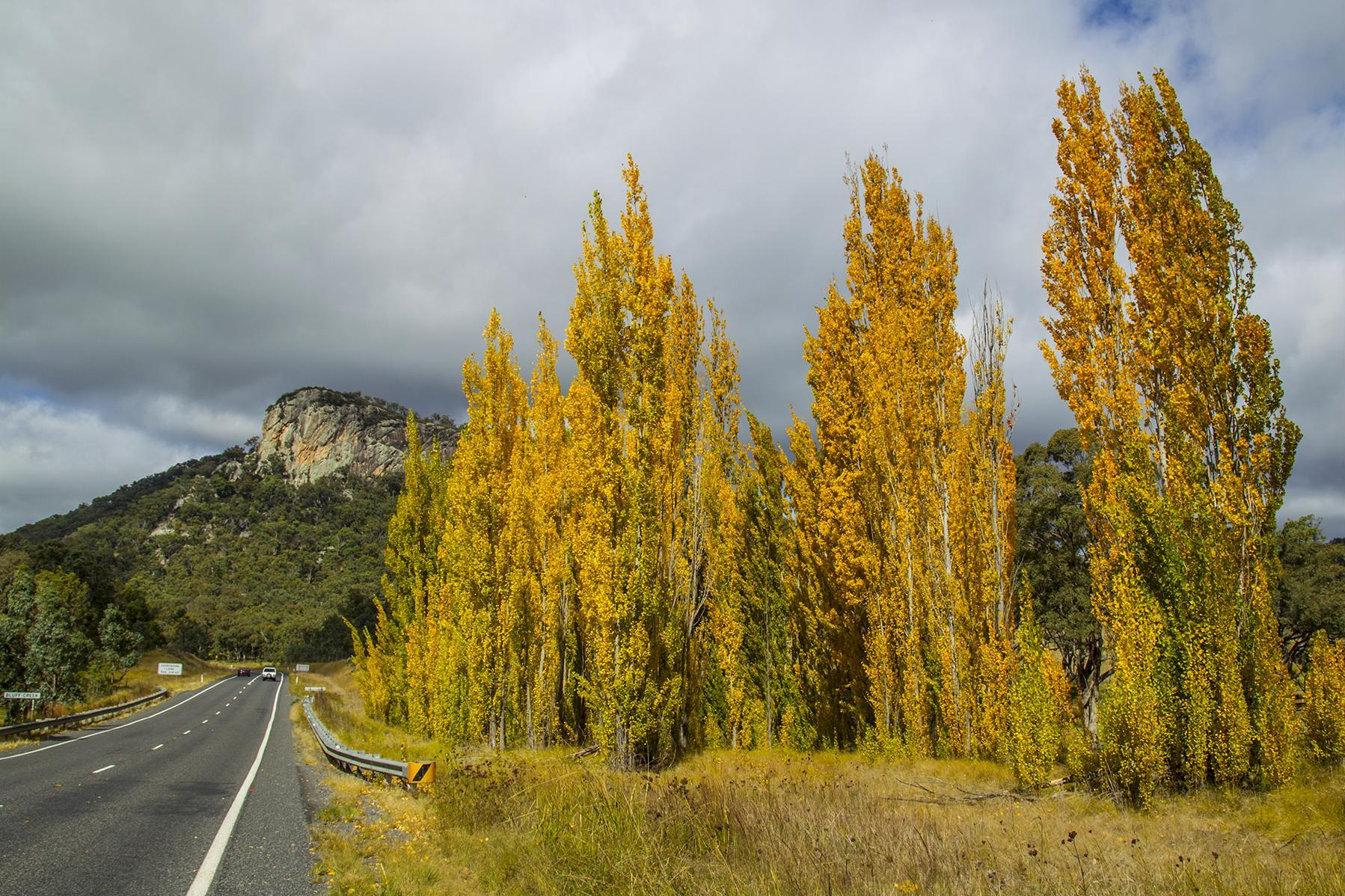
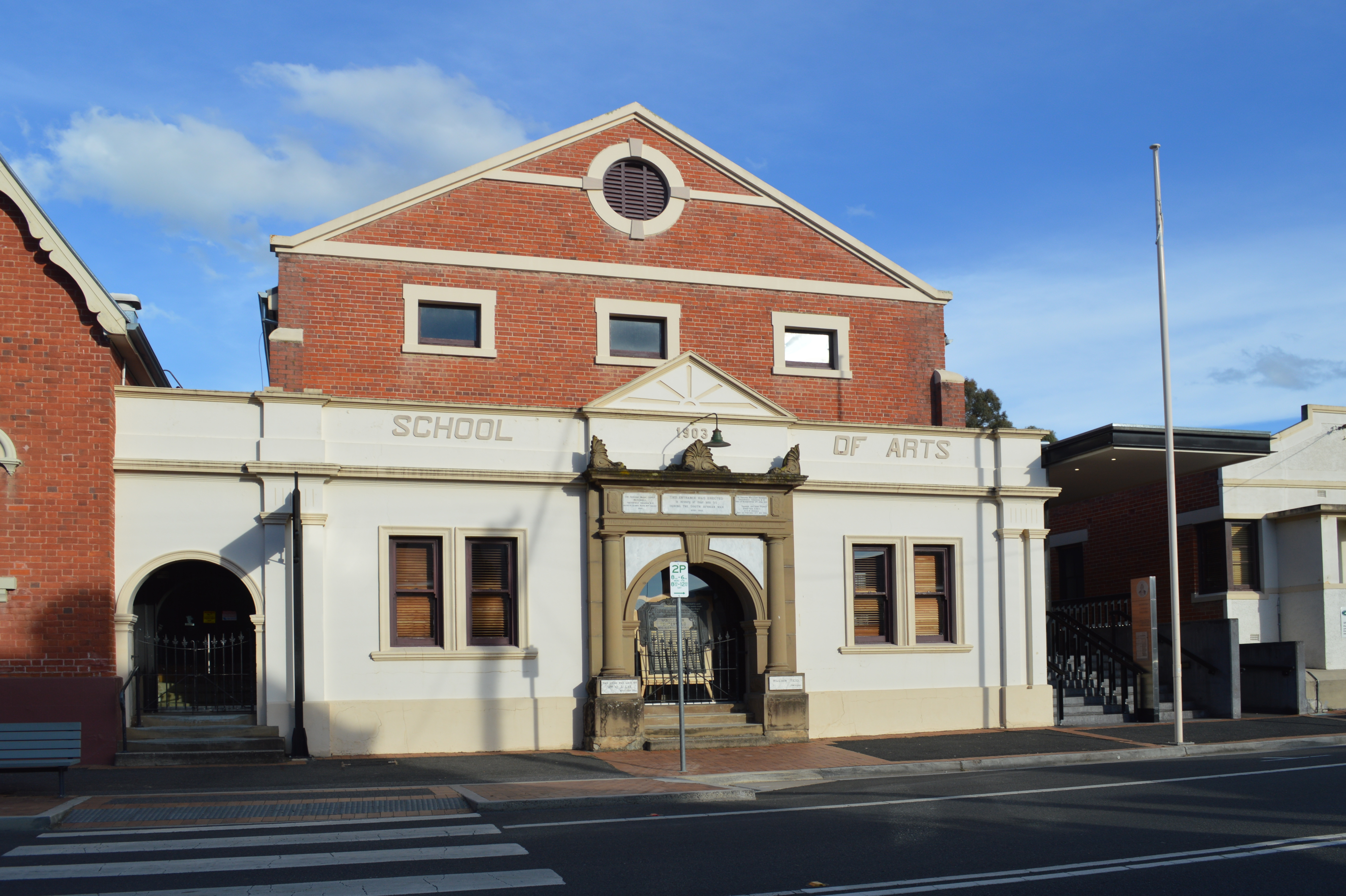
- From left to right; Tenterfield Post Office, Historic Stannum House; Bluff Rock near Tenterfield, the historic School of Arts

- Coordinates: 29°02′55″S 152°01′04″E
- Country: Australia
- State: New South Wales
- LGA: Tenterfield Shire
- Location: 699 km (434 mi) N of Sydney; 299 km (186 mi) NE of Tamworth; 275 km (171 mi) SW of Brisbane; 128 km (80 mi) W of Warwick; 56 km (35 mi) S of Stanthorpe (Qld)
- Established: 1851

Government
  - State electorate: Lismore
  - Federal division: New England
- Elevation: 850 m (2,790 ft)

Population
  - Total: 4,066 (2016 census)
- Postcode: 2372
- County: Clive
- Mean max temp: 21.4 °C (70.5 °F)
- Mean min temp: 8.0 °C (46.4 °F)
- Annual rainfall: 852.4 mm (33.56 in)

Tenterfield is a regional town in New South Wales, Australia, situated at the junction of the New England and Bruxner highways, along the Northern Tablelands, within the New England region. At the 2016 census, Tenterfield had a population of 4,066. Tenterfield's proximity to many regional centres and its position on the route between Sydney and Brisbane led to its development as a centre for the promotion of the federation of Australia.

== Geography ==
Tenterfield is located at the northern end of the New England region, at the intersection of the New England and Bruxner Highways. The town is the seat of the Tenterfield Shire. The closest nearby large town is Stanthorpe, Queensland, being 56 km north via the New England Highway. Tenterfield is three hours from Brisbane, Queensland (276 km), three hours from Byron Bay, New South Wales (205 km), two hours from Armidale, New South Wales (188 km) and eight hours from Sydney (663 km). The town is on the north-western stretch of the Northern Tablelands plateau, a spur of the Great Dividing Range, and is nestled in a valley beneath Mount Mackenzie (1,287m elevation), one of the highest points along the Northern Tablelands.

== History ==
Tenterfield's first inhabitants were the Jukembal people who travelled the area from near Glen Innes to Stanthorpe, Queensland.

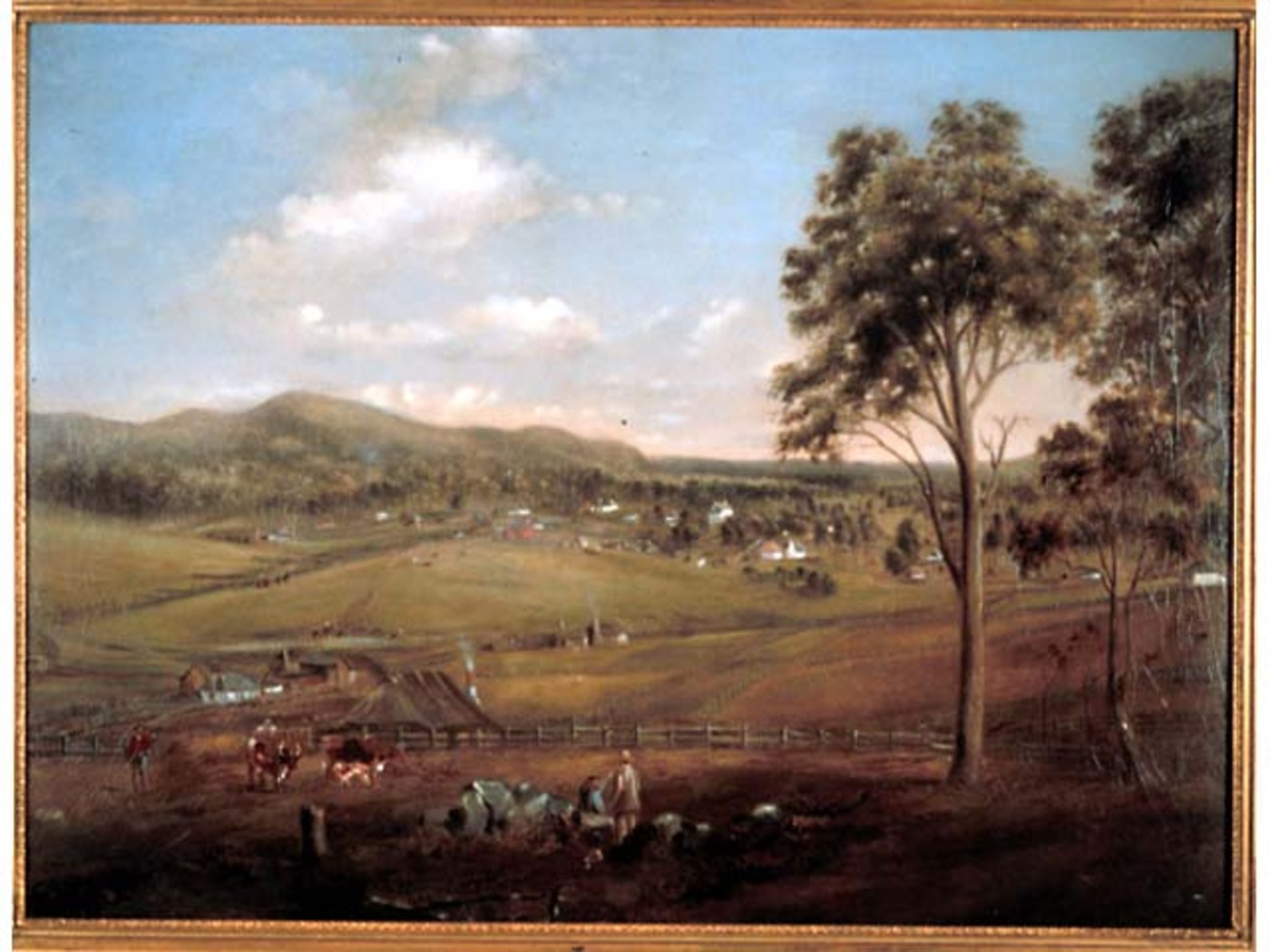
Tenterfield in 1861

In 1841, Sir Stuart Donaldson was running 18,000 sheep on a property that he named Tenterfield Station, after a family home, Tenterfield House, in Haddington, Scotland. Donaldson was the first premier of NSW and made biannual trips to Tenterfield to inspect his holdings there, which covered 100,000 acres (400 km^{2}) of unfenced land.

Tenterfield Post Office opened on 1 January 1849 and the township was gazetted in 1851 with allotments being sold in 1854.

In 1858 gold was discovered at Drake (Fairfield) and shortly afterwards at Timbarra and Boonoo Boonoo. During 1859 an AJS Bank opened and an Anglican church was built the following year. In the 1860s the Tenterfield Chronicle was published, the district court was established; the building of a hospital commenced and a public school was opened. In 1870 the population was less than 900, but the town had five hotels, a school of arts and three churches. The existing Tenterfield Post Office was constructed in 1881.

On 1 February 1919, the presence of cases of Spanish flu in New South Wales resulted in Queensland closing its borders. Travellers bound for Queensland on the Main North railway line were forced to disembark at Tenterfield railway station, the last stop before the train would close the border. The Tenterfield showgrounds were turned in a temporary quarantine camp occupied by up to 700 people. Some people chose to return to Sydney while other spent a week in the camp after which they could enter Queensland.

During World War II, Tenterfield was earmarked as a key battleground if the Japanese should invade Australia. During 1942 thousands of soldiers were set up in emergency camps, unbeknown to the locals, to cope with such an event. Overgrown tank traps and gun emplacements can still be seen on the Travelling Stock Route near the New England Highway. The highway was until the early 1950s the only all-weather road from Sydney to Brisbane.

== Heritage listings ==
Tenterfield has a number of heritage-listed sites, including:

- Railway Avenue: Tenterfield railway station
- Manners Street: Tenterfield School of Arts
- 225 Rouse Street: Tenterfield Post Office

The following buildings and sites are listed on the now defunct Register of the National Estate. Also includes other buildings and sites as part of Tenterfield's history

- Stannum House, 114 Rouse Street, built c. 1888 by John Holmes Reid – exhibits ex-Buckingham Palace carpets and antique furniture
- Ayrdrie, Casino Road, country house built c. 1860
- Tenterfield Post Office, built 1881
- Court House, Gaol and Police Buildings, Molesworth Street, 1874–1882
- Church of Our Lady of Perpetual Succour (Tenterfield Catholic Church), 73 Miles Street, oldest building in use in the Catholic Diocese of Armidale
- Tenterfield Saddlery, c. 1870, used as a private residence, bank and saddlery
- Tenterfield School of Arts, 203 Rouse Street, c. 1876
- Bald Rock National Park, 25 kilometres (16 mi) north of Tenterfield
- Boonoo Boonoo National Park, 23 kilometres (14 mi) north-east of Tenterfield
- Tooloom Falls Area, south-west of Urbenville
- Basket Swamp National Park, 19 kilometres (12 mi) north-east of Tenterfield
- Woolool Wooloolni/Wellington Rock Aboriginal Site, Basket Swamp National Park
- Aldershot Cottage, built c. 1860s
- Deloraine Cottage, built c. 1860s
- 124 High Street, built c. 1860s
- Flanagan's Men's Shop, oldest men's wear shop in Australia

== Railway – Main North Railway Line ==
The railway opened to Tenterfield on 28 October 1884 and in 1886 to nearby Wallangarra/Jennings on the Queensland border, connecting Sydney and Brisbane, with a break-of-gauge at Wallangarra. When the rail link to the Queensland border was completed, Sydney and Brisbane were linked by rail for the first time. The railway was subsequently bypassed by the fully standard gauge North Coast line between Sydney and Brisbane, which was completed in 1932. The Main North line is now closed north of Armidale through to Wallangarra/Jennings, and the Tenterfield railway station is now a museum.

There was considerable debate about whether the break of gauge should take place at the existing town of Tenterfield, or at a whole new town at the border, which respectively became Wallangarra (Queensland side) and Jennings (New South Wales side).

== Tenterfield Oration ==
Sir Henry Parkes delivered his Federation Speech, commonly referred to as the "Tenterfield Oration", in the Tenterfield School of Arts on 24 October 1889. He was travelling from Brisbane to Sydney, via the new Main North railway. The speech is credited with re-igniting the debate that ultimately led to Federation on 1 January 1901. Parkes never got to see his oration come to fruition, dying 5 years prior to the Federation of Australia.

== Population ==
Historical population
Year	Pop.	±%
1921	2,493	—
1933	2,622	+5.2%
1947	3,046	+16.2%
1954	3,268	+7.3%
1961	3,105	−5.0%
1966	3,270	+5.3%
1971	3,239	−0.9%
1976	3,563	+10.0%
1981	3,402	−4.5%
1986	3,370	−0.9%
1991	3,310	−1.8%
1996	3,205	−3.2%
2001	3,172	−1.0%
2006	3,130	−1.3%
2011	2,997	−4.2%
2016	2,914	−2.8%
2021	2,826	−3.0%
Source: Australian Bureau of Statistics data.

According to the 2016 census of Population, there were 4,066 people in Tenterfield.

- Aboriginal and Torres Strait Islander people made up 5.0% of the population.
- 80.6% of people were born in Australia and 86.7% of people spoke only English at home.
- The most common responses for religion were Anglican 24.7%, Catholic 24.3% and No Religion 19.1%.

== Industries ==
The main industries in the Tenterfield district are beef cattle breeding and superfine wool production through the breeding of Merino sheep. There are ten state forests in the Tenterfield district covering 7,540 hectares (18,600 acres).

== Media ==
The only commercial radio stations serving Tenterfield are Rebel FM 93.7 and The Breeze 102.5.

The Tenterfield-based community radio station is Ten FM. The station also broadcasts to Stanthorpe north of the border, on a separate frequency.

National radio stations such as ABC New England North West and ABC Radio National broadcast to Tenterfield on local FM repeaters.

Tenterfield's local newspaper is The Tenterfield Star, which is a weekly newspaper issued each Wednesday. The newspaper has been published for more than 170 years and was once owned by J. F. Thomas, the solicitor who defended Breaker Morant.

Tenterfield is incorporated into the Lismore television licence area and as such receives regional news bulletins on Seven (formerly Prime7) and Nine along with brief local news updates on Network 10's 10 Northern NSW (formerly Southern Cross 10 and WIN Television Northern NSW).

== Local geography ==
The local geography is dominated by prominent granite inselbergs and mountains, the most famous being that of Bald Rock, which sits within the Bald Rock National Park, and Bluff Rock which is located 12 minutes drive south of Tenterfield on the New England Highway. Prominent natural landmarks close to Tenterfield are:

- Mount Mackenzie – 1,258m elevation, south-west of CBD, and the highest point in the Tenterfield Shire. Used for television towers and Telstra towers. Features a 141-hectare nature reserve.
- Doctor's Nose – 1,165m elevation – features a 66-hectare nature reserve. Named for resembling the shape of the nose of a local doctor.

== Climate ==
Tenterfield has an oceanic climate (Cfb), with cool to cold winters, warm wet summers and a high diurnal range due to its valley location. It sits at an altitude of 850 metres (2,790 ft) above sea level, and temperatures below freezing are common in the winter months. Tenterfield averages 47 days where the minimum temperature drops below 0 °C or 32 °F each year.

The town receives light to moderate snowfalls during severe winters. This only occurs once every 20–30 years, although the town experiences occasional sleet. The nearby Mount Mackenzie (1,287 metres or 4,222 feet elevation) generally receives light, sometimes moderate, snowfall annually. The town's last snowfall occurred during the winter of 2015, although, the most recent snowfall close to Tenterfield was on 4 June 2019, when a low pressure system swept north through NSW. This caused it to snow on Mount Mackenzie and other points above 1,000 metres or 3,280 feet throughout the New England region.

Summers are moderately warm and stable, with most days during the summer months reaching 23 °C (73.4 °F) or above, and generally not dropping below 9 °C (48 °F) overnight. The majority of precipitation occurs as thunderstorms, which can be severe. Tenterfield's highest recorded temperature was 39.9 °C (103.8 °F), which was recorded on 12 February 2017. Its coldest recorded temperature was −10.6 °C (12.9 °F), which was recorded on 10 July 2006.

Climate data for Tenterfield (Federation Park, 1907–2024, rainfall to 1870); 838 m AMSL; 29.05° S, 152.02° E
Month	Jan	Feb	Mar	Apr	May	Jun	Jul	Aug	Sep	Oct	Nov	Dec	Year
Record high °C (°F)	38.3 (100.9)	39.9 (103.8)	35.6 (96.1)	32.9 (91.2)	27.1 (80.8)	24.6 (76.3)	23.3 (73.9)	30.0 (86.0)	31.2 (88.2)	33.9 (93.0)	36.2 (97.2)	36.8 (98.2)	39.9 (103.8)
Mean daily maximum °C (°F)	27.1 (80.8)	26.1 (79.0)	24.6 (76.3)	21.7 (71.1)	18.0 (64.4)	15.0 (59.0)	14.5 (58.1)	16.1 (61.0)	19.5 (67.1)	22.4 (72.3)	24.8 (76.6)	26.6 (79.9)	21.4 (70.5)
Mean daily minimum °C (°F)	14.4 (57.9)	14.3 (57.7)	12.4 (54.3)	8.5 (47.3)	4.9 (40.8)	2.4 (36.3)	1.0 (33.8)	1.8 (35.2)	4.7 (40.5)	8.0 (46.4)	10.8 (51.4)	13.0 (55.4)	8.0 (46.4)
Record low °C (°F)	4.5 (40.1)	4.0 (39.2)	−3.0 (26.6)	−5.0 (23.0)	−8.8 (16.2)	−9.3 (15.3)	−10.6 (12.9)	−9.5 (14.9)	−7.2 (19.0)	−3.4 (25.9)	−2.0 (28.4)	1.2 (34.2)	−10.6 (12.9)
Average rainfall mm (inches)	113.7 (4.48)	93.1 (3.67)	82.6 (3.25)	47.5 (1.87)	48.3 (1.90)	49.5 (1.95)	52.6 (2.07)	43.3 (1.70)	49.8 (1.96)	75.8 (2.98)	84.5 (3.33)	105.3 (4.15)	845.1 (33.27)
Average rainy days (≥ 1.0 mm)	8.8	8.1	7.9	5.6	5.7	5.9	5.7	5.2	5.3	7.0	7.5	8.7	81.4
Average afternoon relative humidity (%)	56	58	58	58	61	60	56	50	46	47	53	53	55
Source: Bureau of Meteorology,

== Mount Mackenzie Road Fire ==
On 6 September 2019, a grass fire started near Mount Mackenzie Road, opposite the Tenterfield Cemetery, to the south west of Tenterfield. The fire was exacerbated by dry winds and unseasonable heat due to a weather front that was sweeping across New South Wales. Within an hour, the fire was upgraded to an emergency level threat and swept across the southern edge of the town, jumping across the New England Highway. All schools in Tenterfield were evacuated and power was cut to the town. The fire burned eastwards, within the vicinity of Billirimba road and Scrub road. 65 homes in the immediate area of the fire were saved. one home was destroyed and 4 other homes damaged severely. 2 car yards, a pistol club and 12 outbuildings were destroyed and another 8 outbuildings damaged A 66 year old Tenterfield local, Neville Smith, a volunteer NSW firefighter, was severely injured when the fire truck he was in was engulfed by flames while defending a property, He was stabilised at Tenterfield Hospital then airlifted to Brisbane in a stable but critical condition.

The fire continued to burn with an emergency warning throughout the night and was later downgraded by the New South Wales Rural Fire Service to a 'watch and act' level on 7 September as conditions on the fire grounds were easing due to cooler weather and large teams of firefighters with multiple aircraft assisting them with the fire.

== Notable residents ==
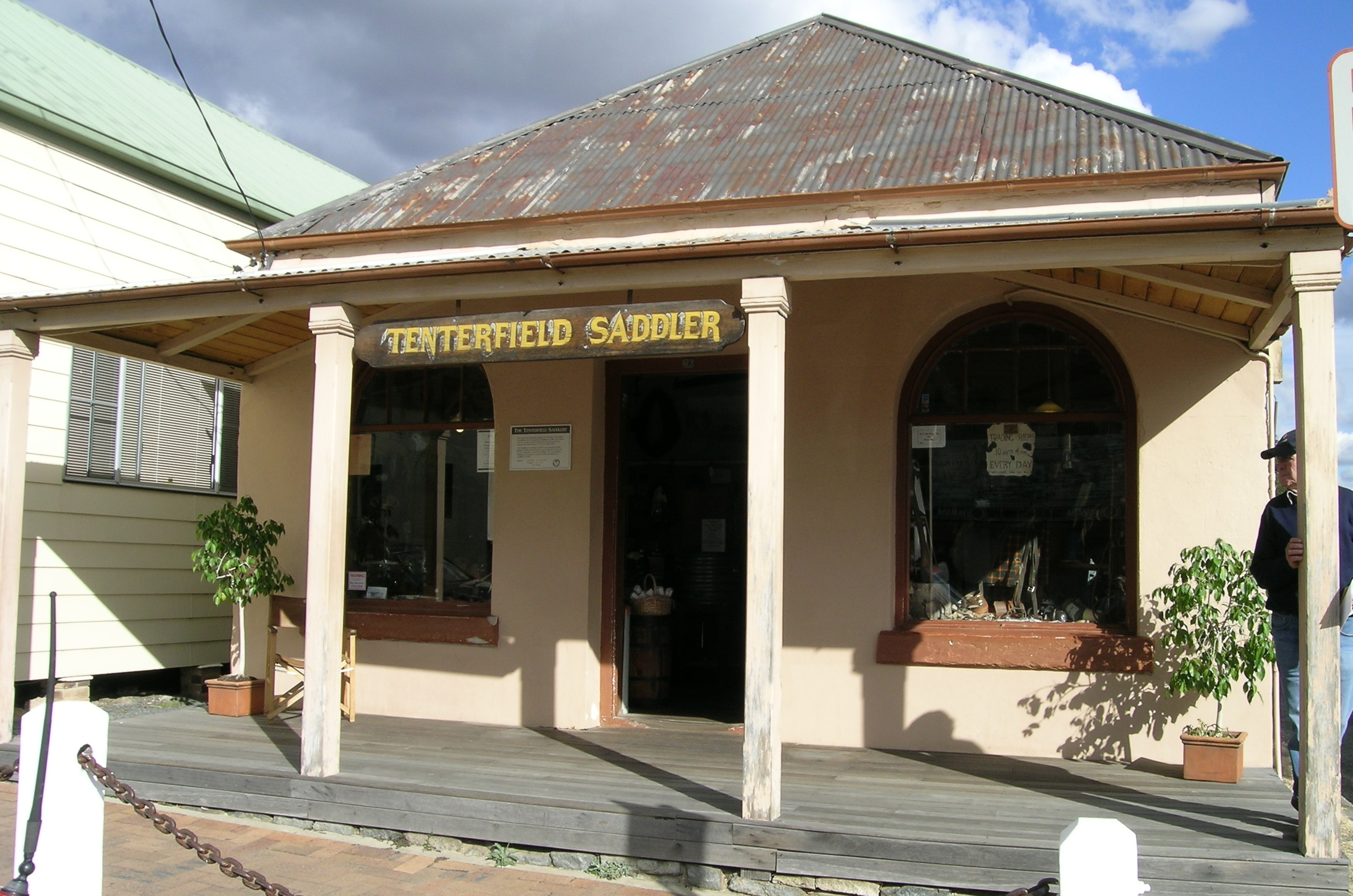
The "Tenterfield Saddlery" made famous by Peter Allen

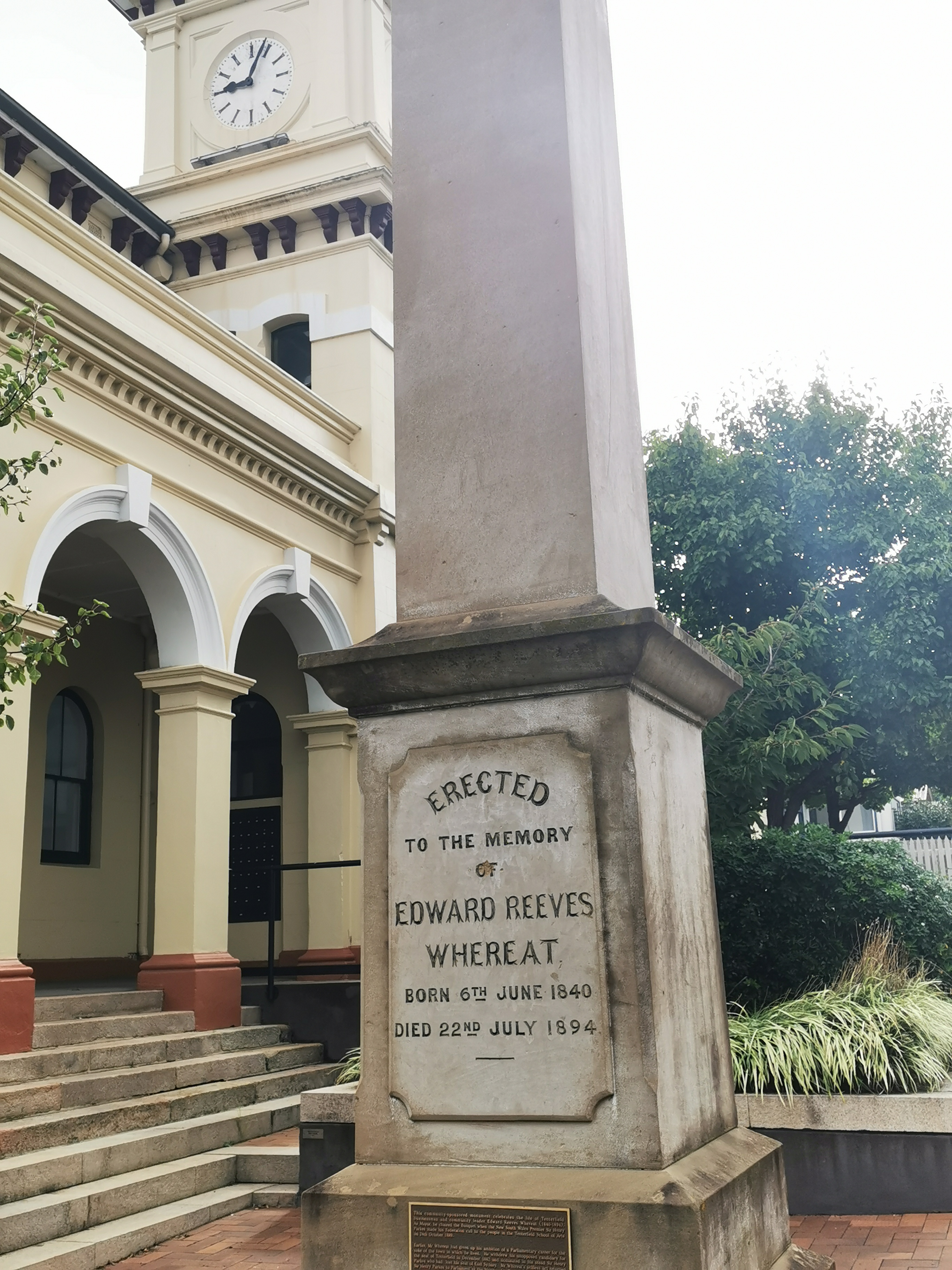
Edward Reeves Whereat memorial obelisk

- Peter Allen, an entertainer who was born in and spent much of his childhood in Tenterfield, where he lived with his grandfather George Woolnough
- Bronwyn Bancroft, an indigenous Australian artist
- William Blakely, born in Tenterfield in 1875, a botanist and plant collector
- Sir Harry Chauvel, born at nearby Tabulam, the first Australian to command a military Corps
- William Folster, politician
- Robert Guy Howarth, born in Tenterfield in 1906, scholar, literary critic and poet
- Katherine Knight (born 1955), murderer who skinned her partner and cooked his body parts
- Sir Clarence McKerihan, banker and president of the Rural Bank of New South Wales.
- Billy Moore, NRL footballer
- A.B. "Banjo" Paterson
- Jenny Saville, professional golfer
- Gary Shearston (1939–2013), singer and songwriter.
- Dr. Leonard Smith, Aboriginal Artist, Writer, Professional Rugby League Player, Australian Army Veteran and Philanthropist. Attended Tenterfield High in 1959
- Charlie Tapscott, two time paralympian silver medalist
- Major J.F. Thomas, a solicitor known for his vigorous defence of Harry "Breaker" Morant, and once owned and operated the Tenterfield Star newspaper. Jack Thompson portrayed Thomas in the 1980 film Breaker Morant
- Edward Reeves Whereat (1840–1894), an early community leader
- George Woolnough, Allen's grandfather, a saddler, the third person to own the saddlery and the subject of Allen's song "Tenterfield Saddler"
- Oliver Woodward, decorated First World War veteran and metallurgist

== Sporting records ==
- The first campdraft ever held (to rules) was held in Tenterfield in c.1885.
- The Australian showjumping record was broken at Tenterfield in 1926 Mrs A. A. Laidlaw's "Lookout", ridden by A. McPhee jumped 7’10¼".
- The world showjumping record was broken at Tenterfield in 1936 by C. H. Perry's "Lookout", ridden by W Marton when he jumped 8’3½".
- Guinness World Record achieved by then local Police Sergeant Troy Grant at the Tenterfield Golf Club in 2004 for the most holes of golf completed in 7 days.
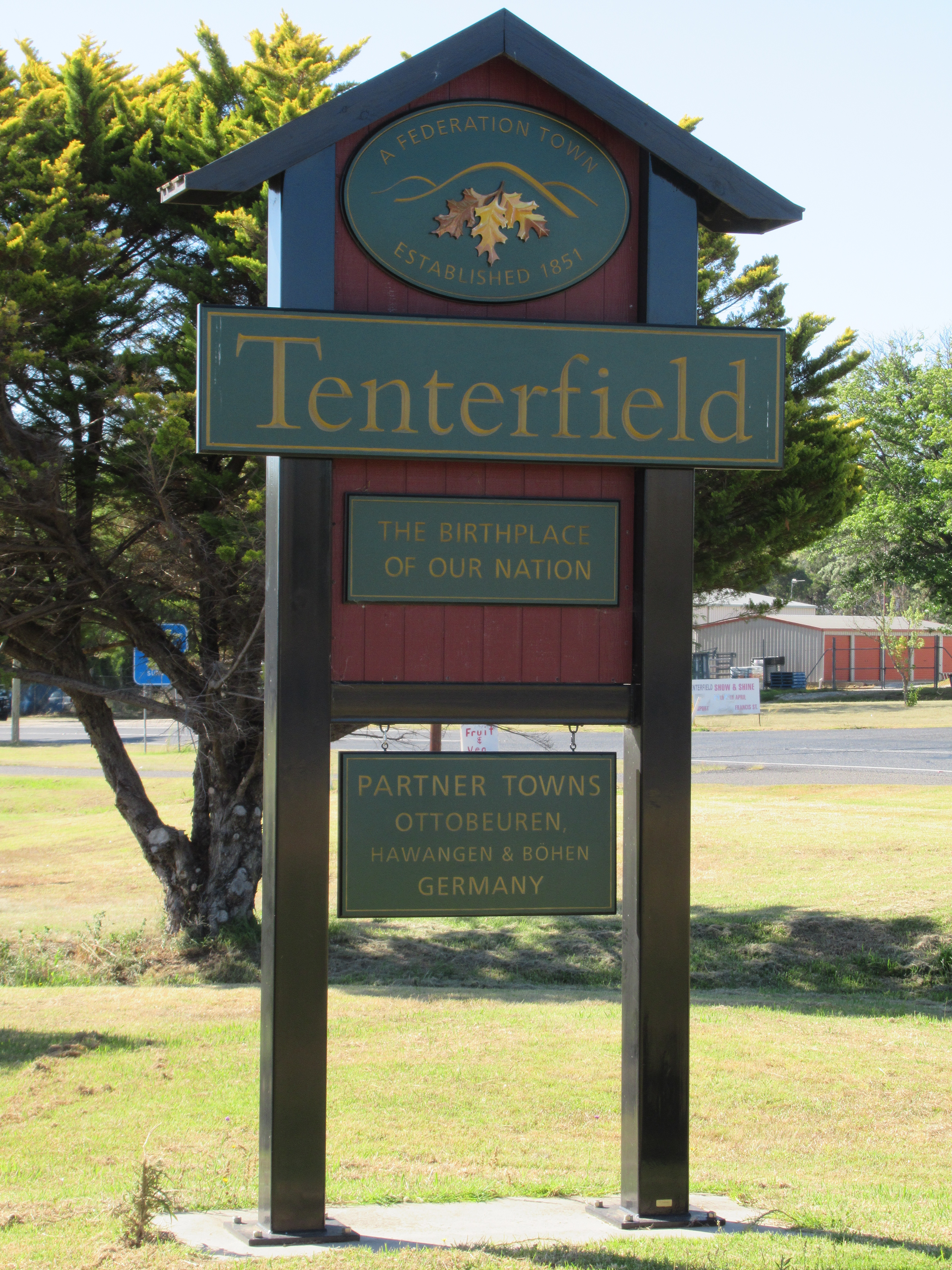
Entrance sign to Tenterfield

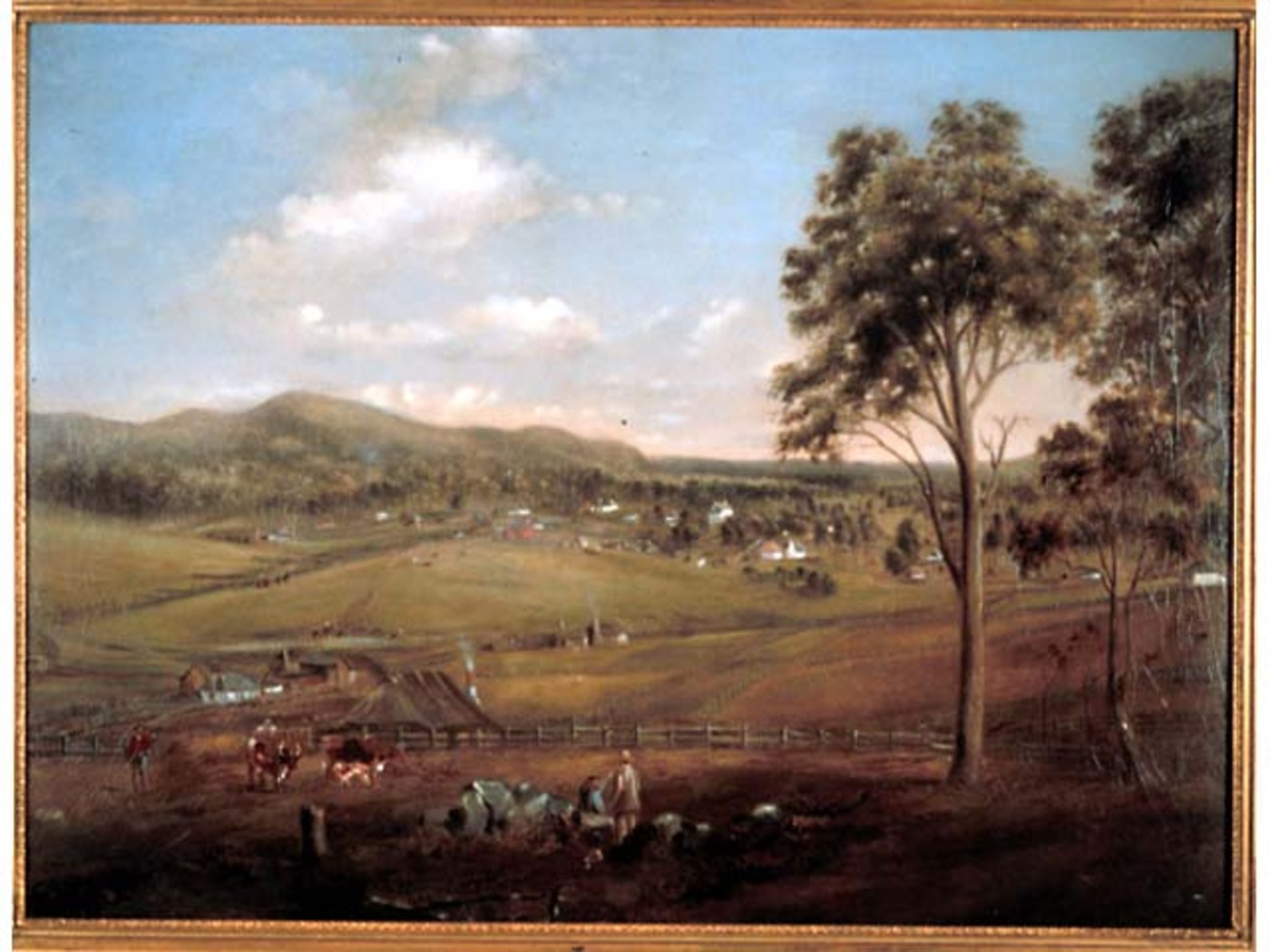
Tenterfield in 1861

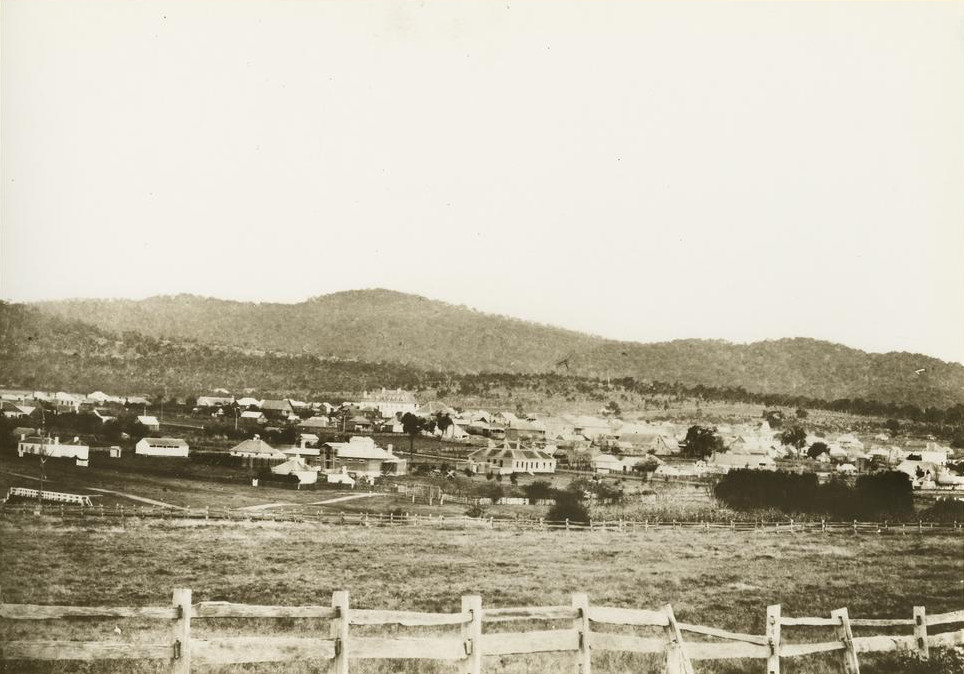
View of Tenterfield 1887

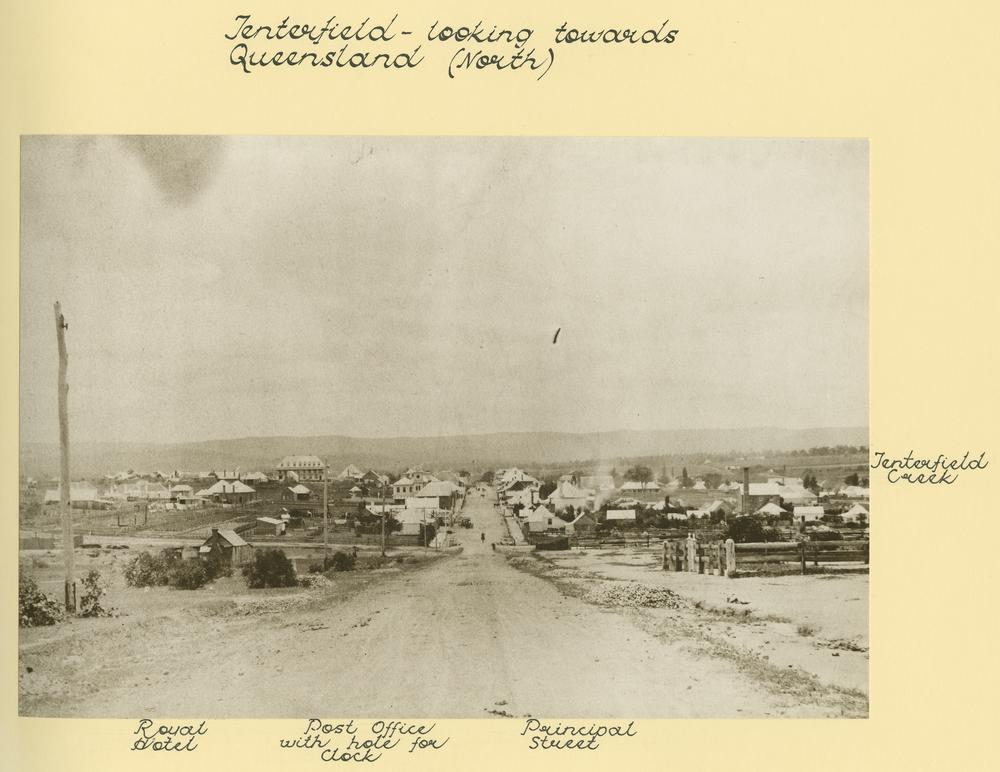
Main Street 1887

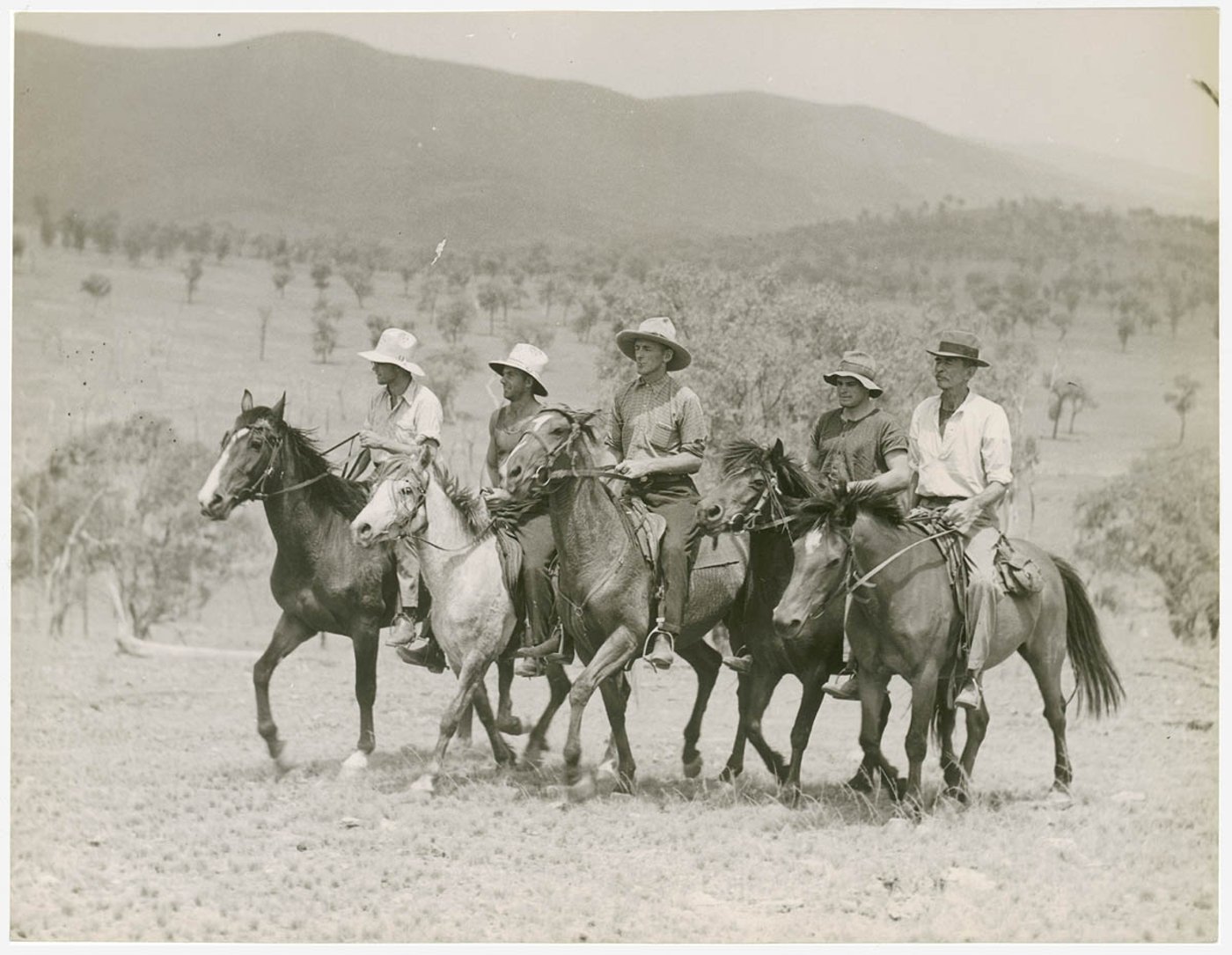
Drovers, 1942

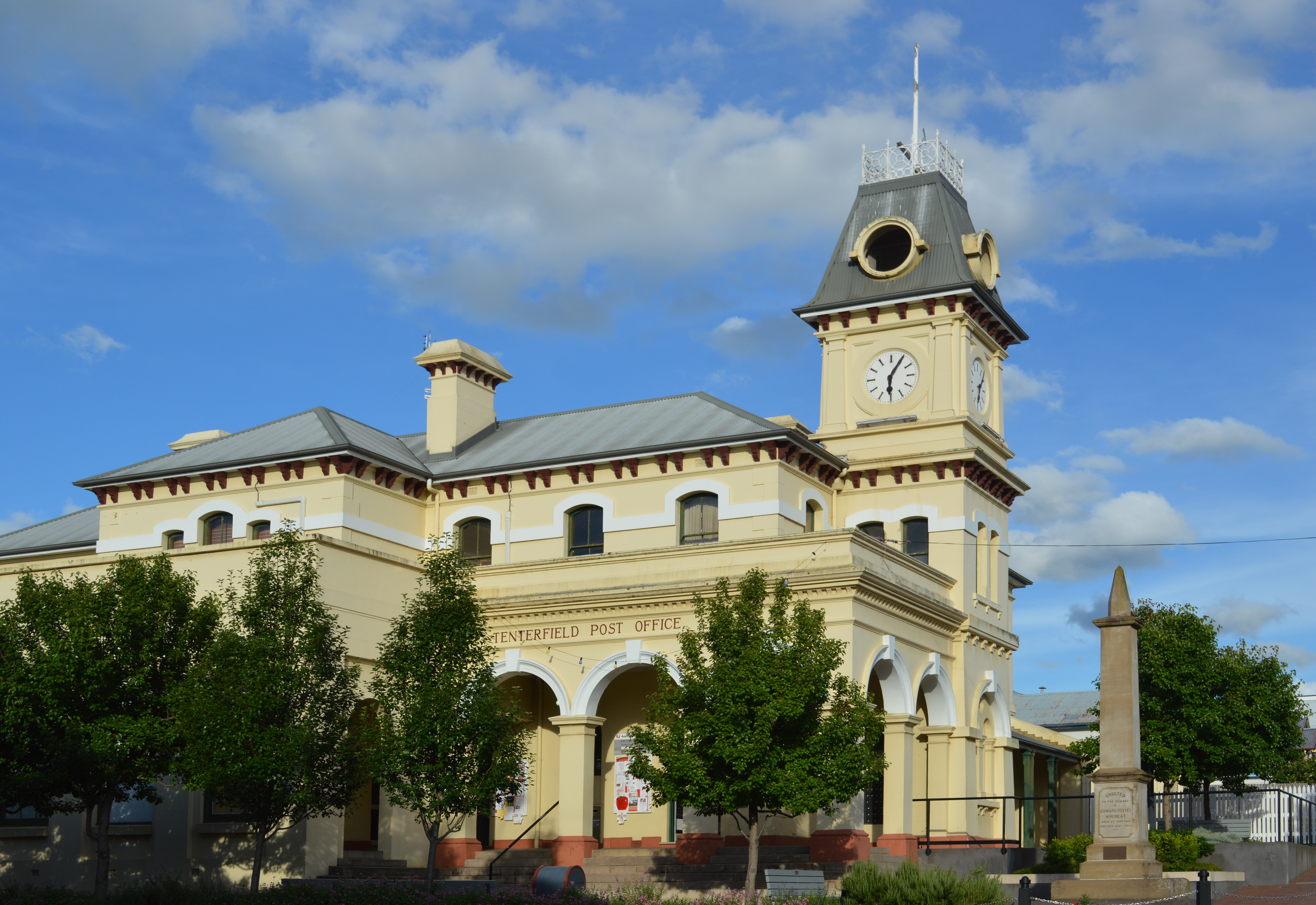
Tenterfield Post Office

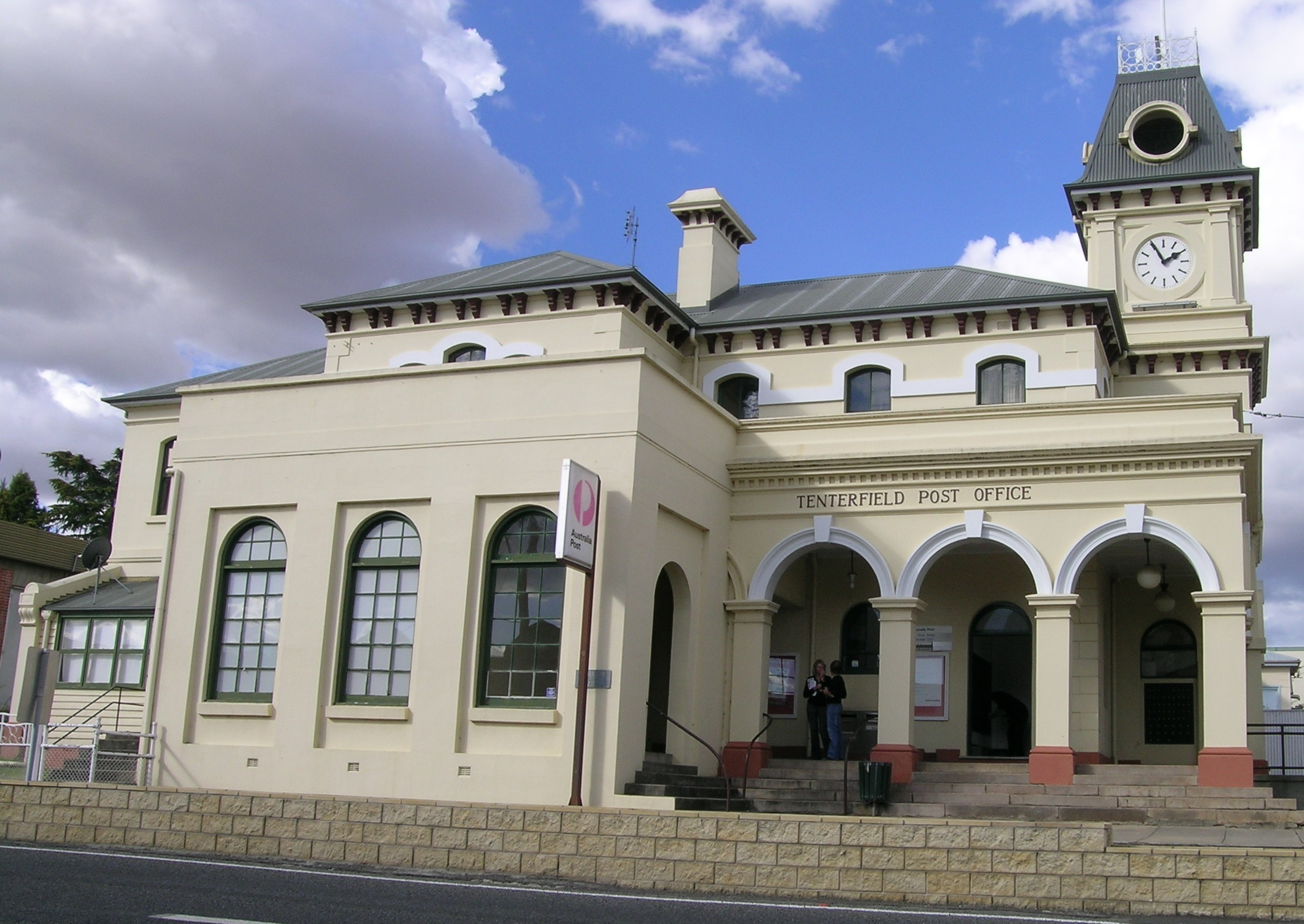
Post Office, Rouse Street

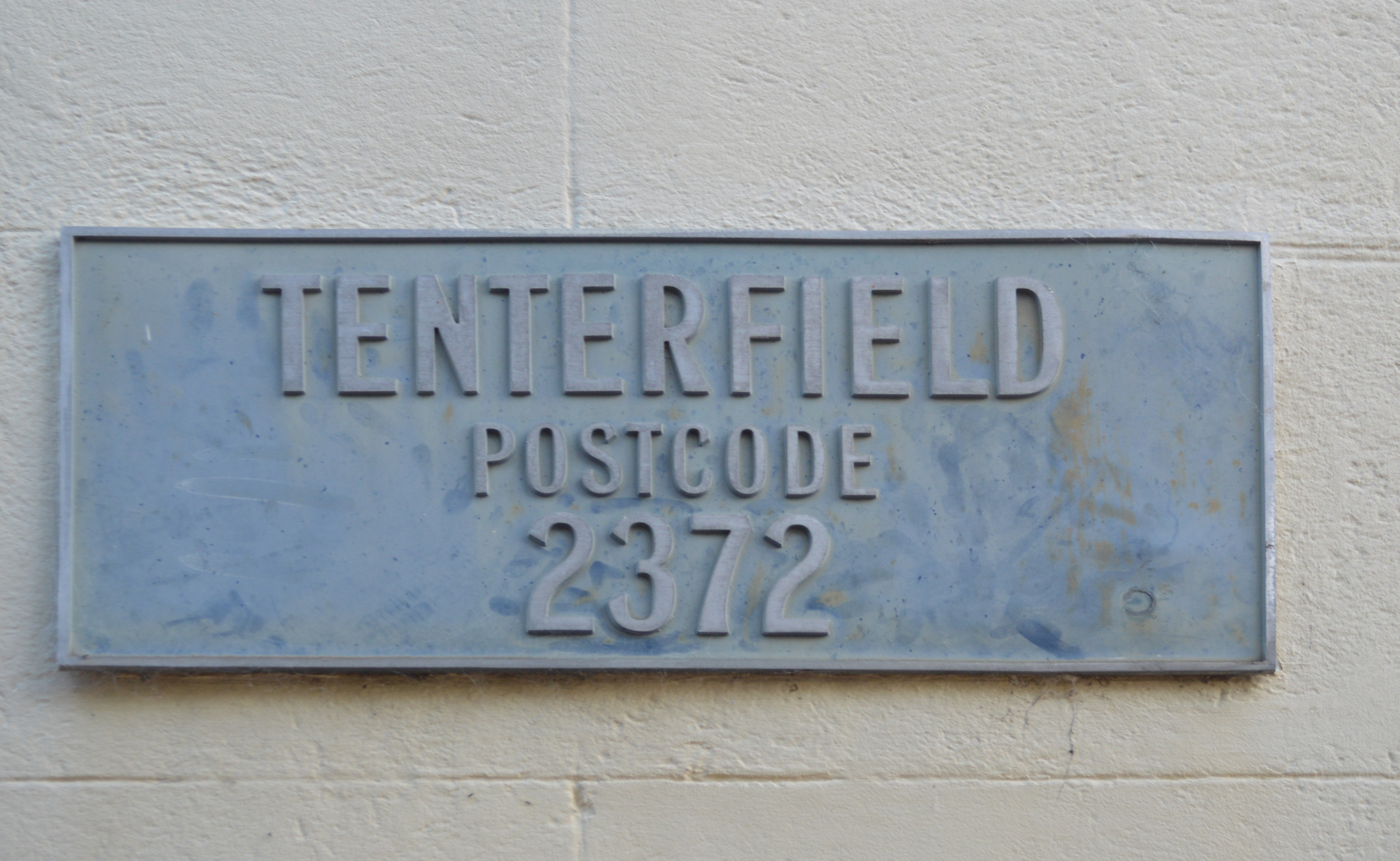
Plaque with postcode

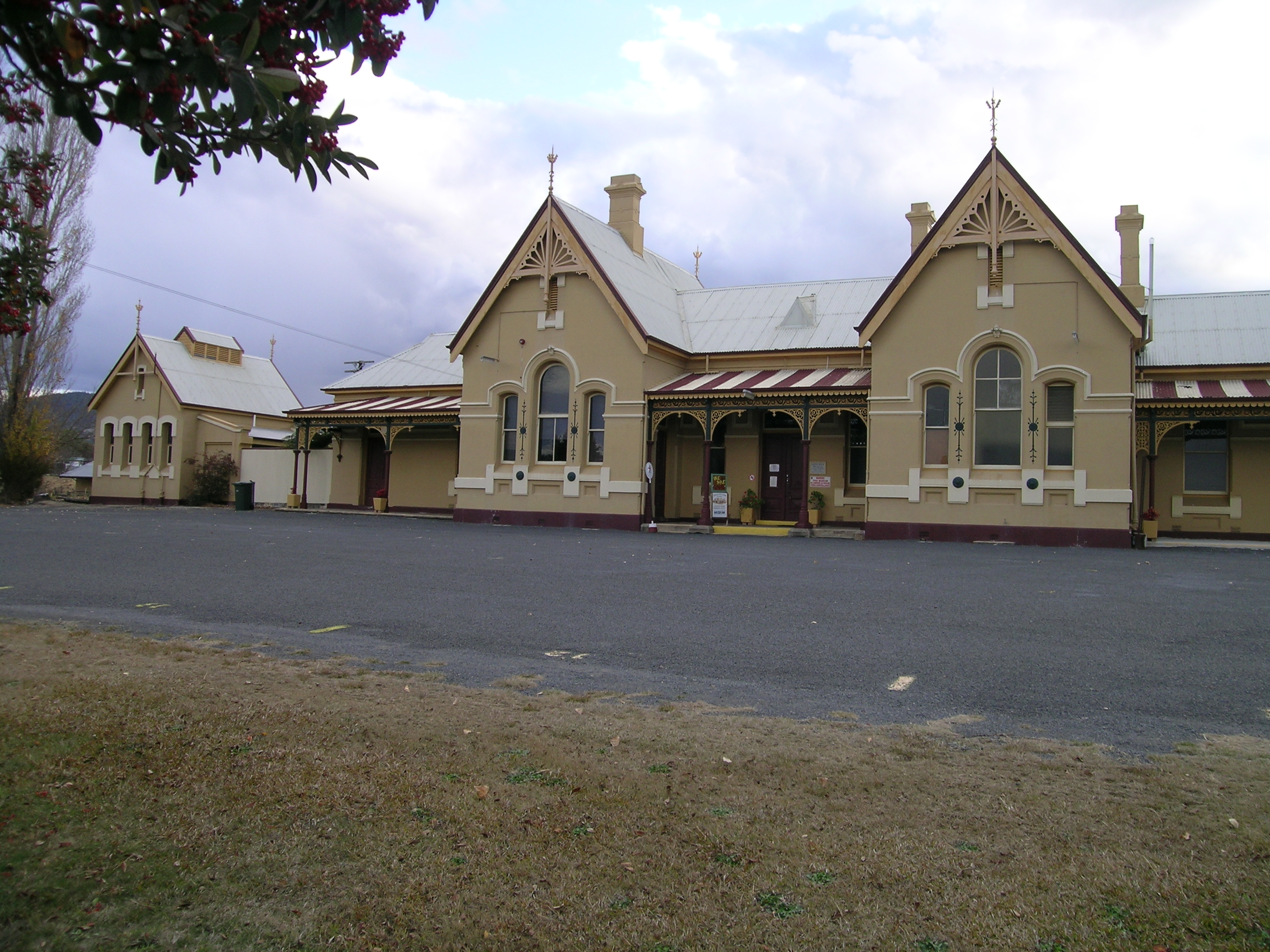
Railway Station, now a museum

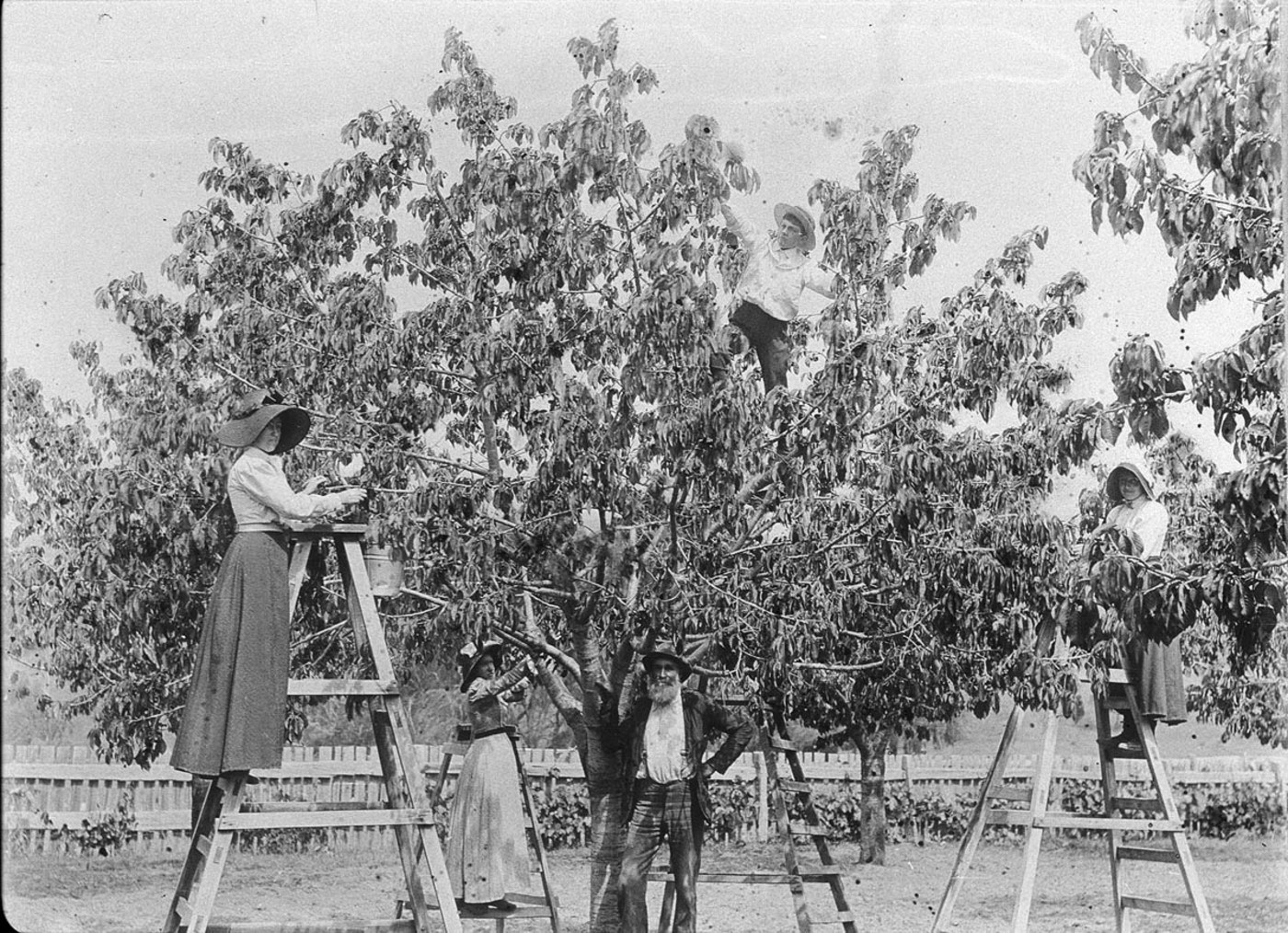
Cherry pickers 1900

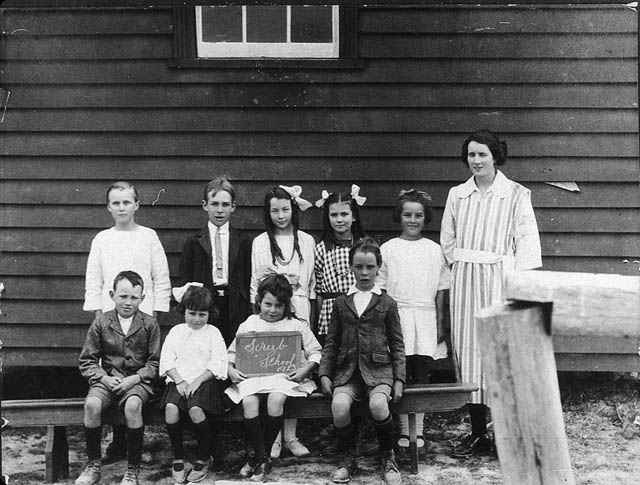
Scrub school 1923

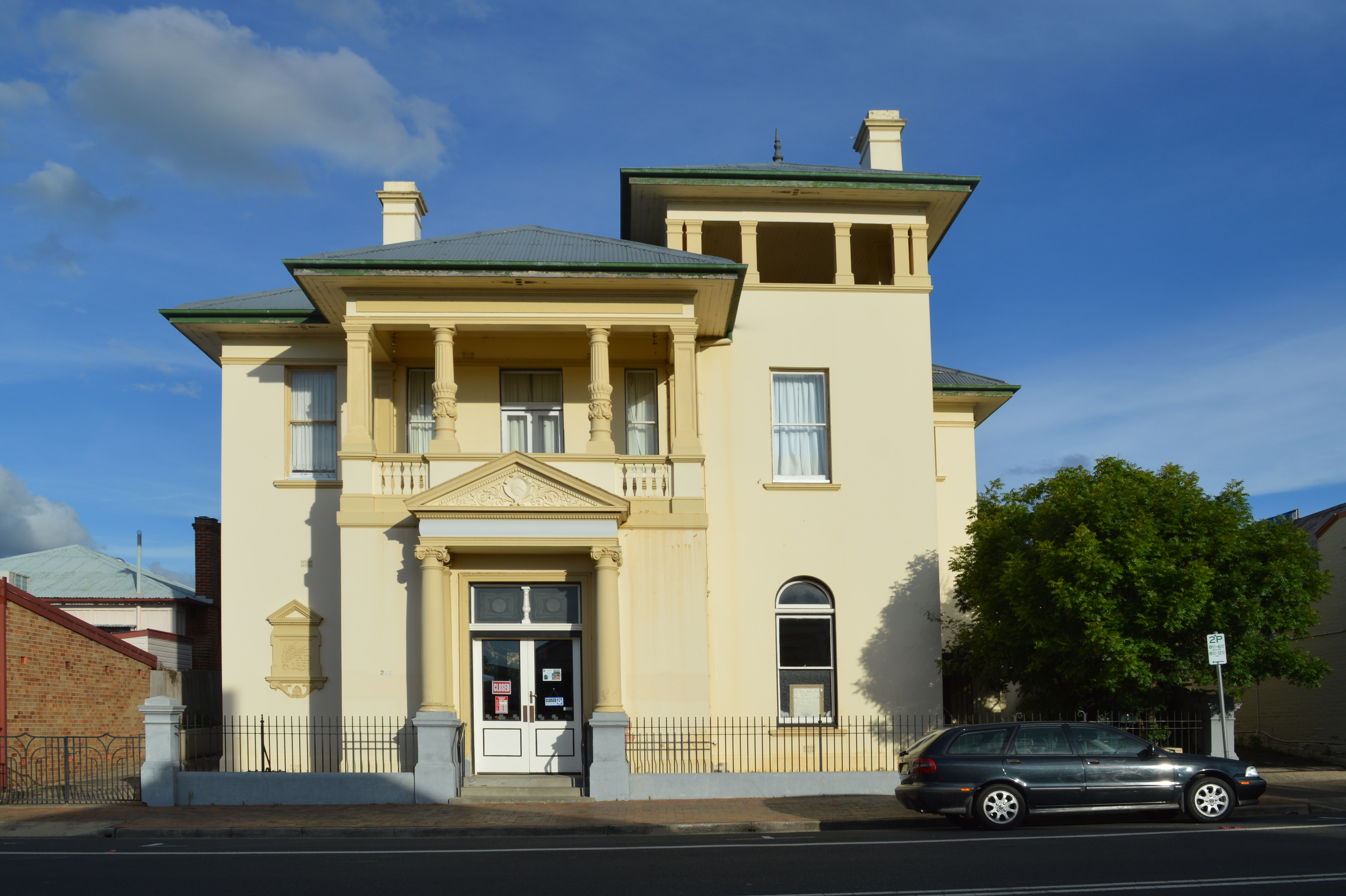
Tenterfield Rural Bank

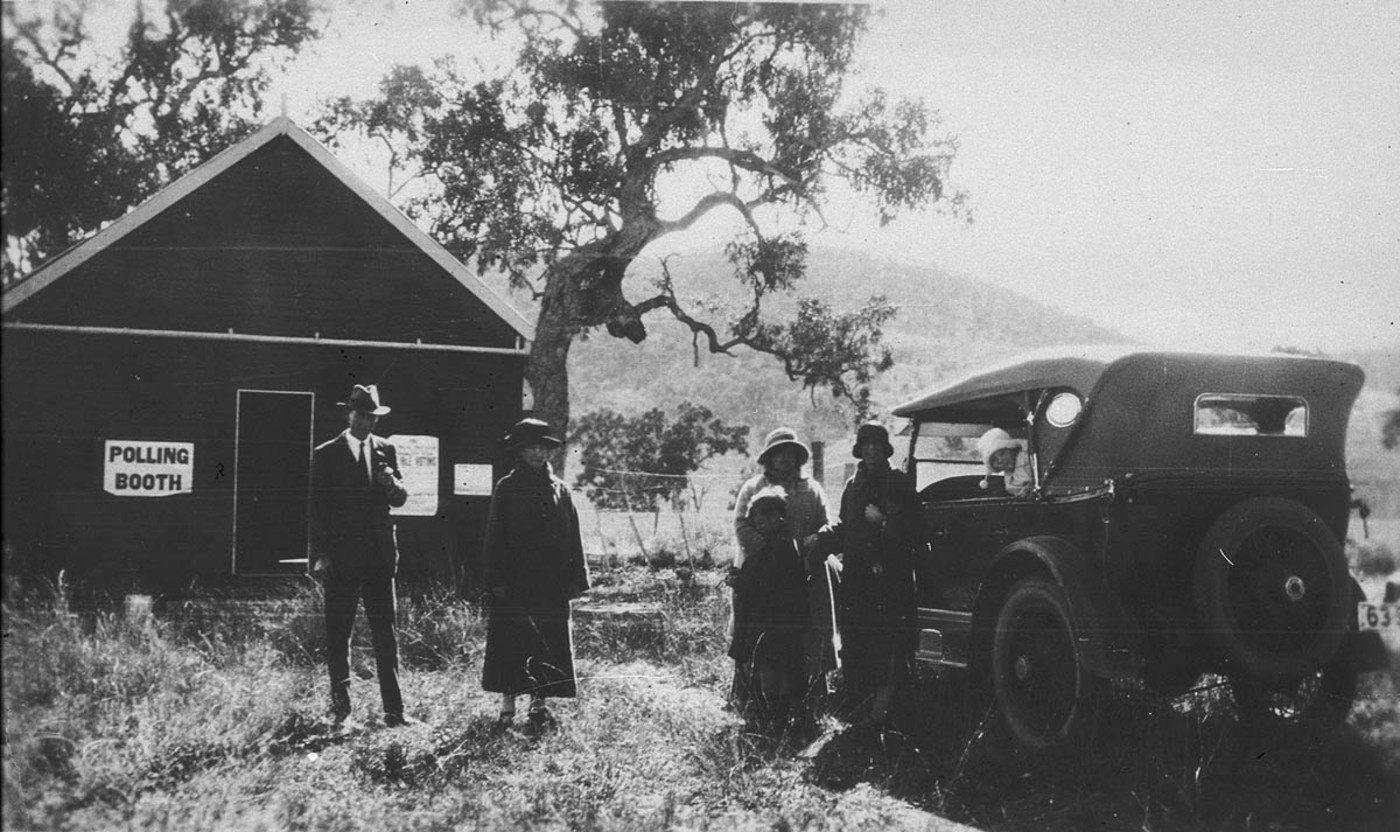
Polling booth c.1925

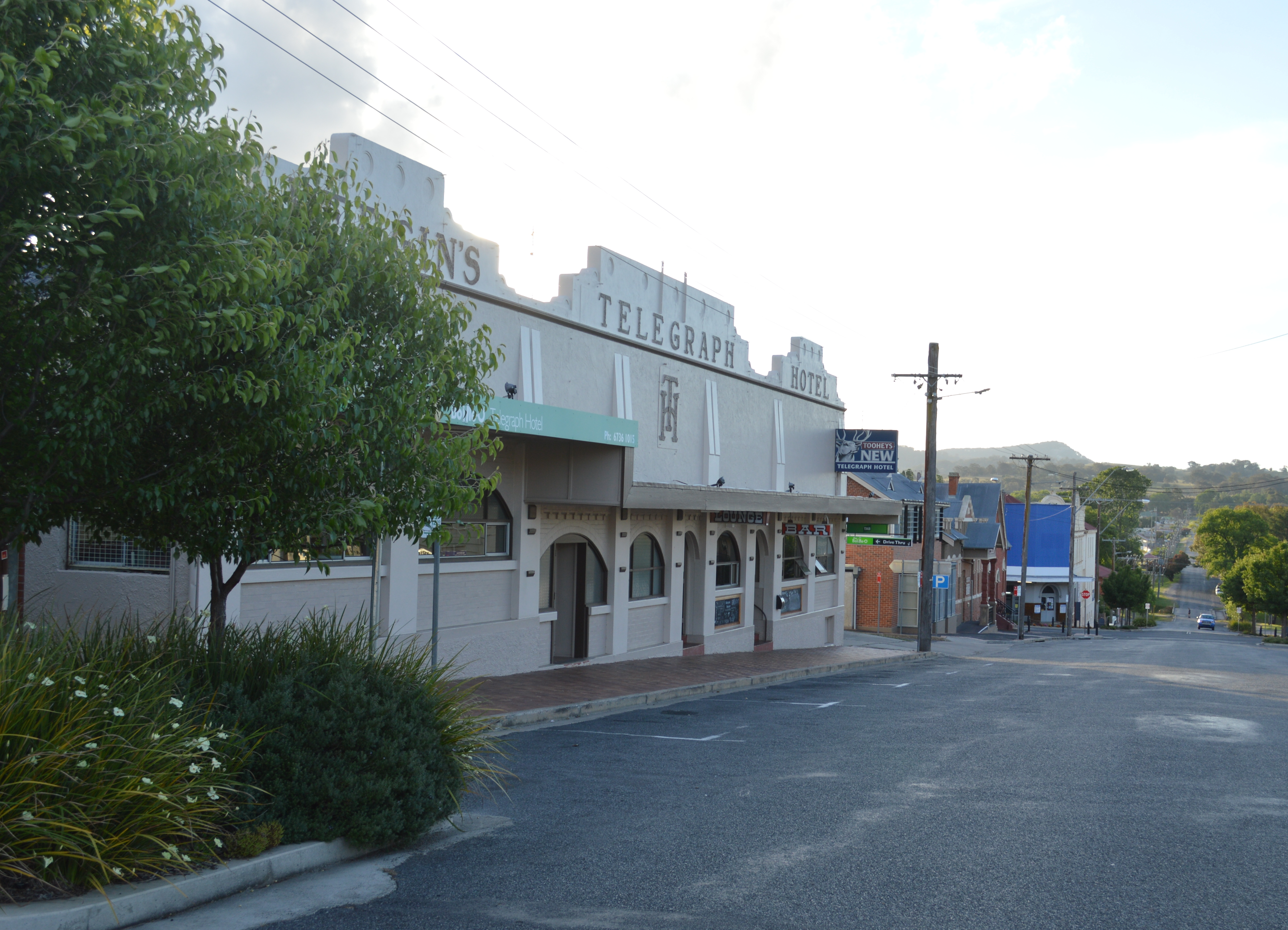
Telegraph Hotel

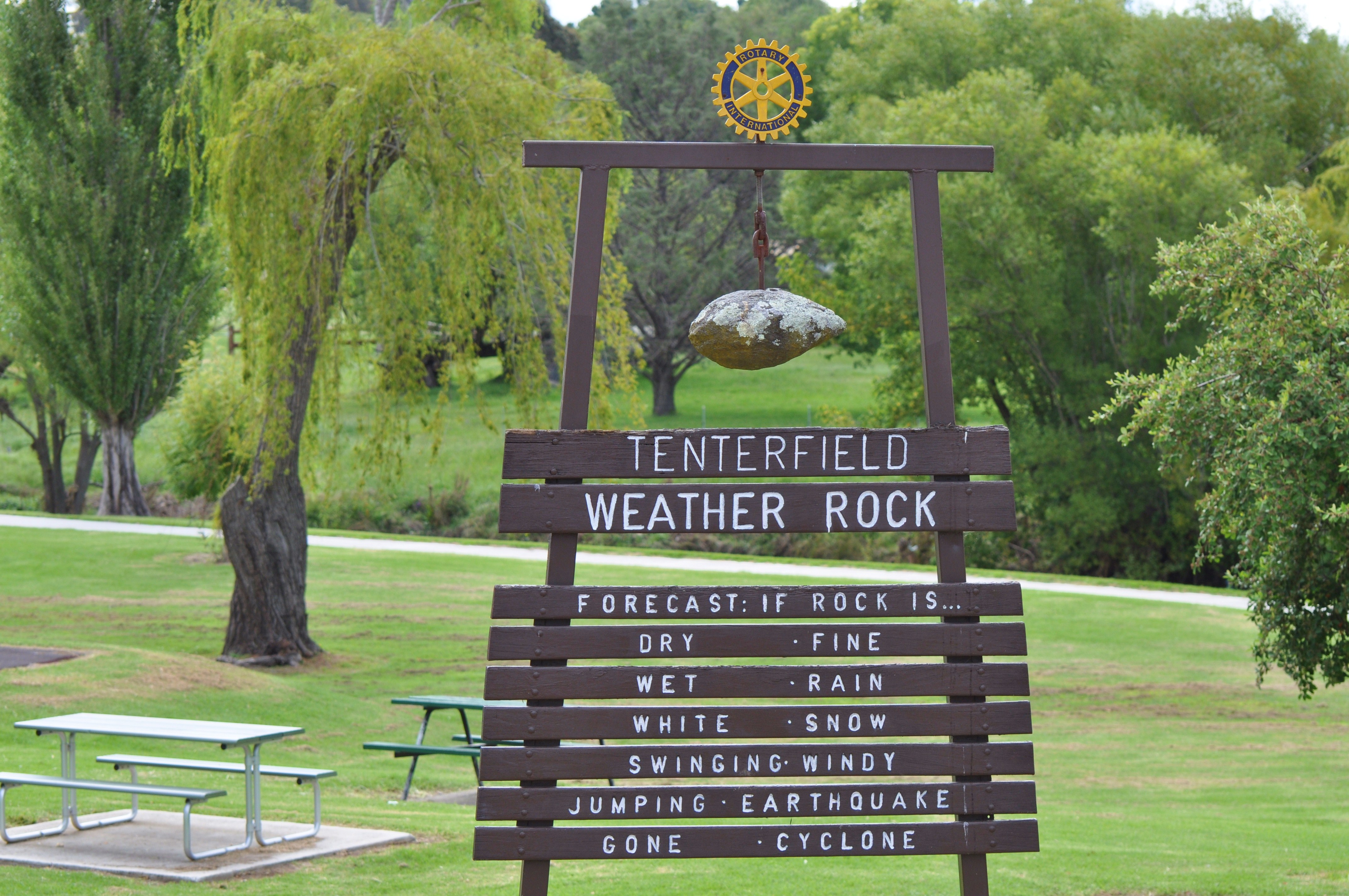
Weather predicting rock

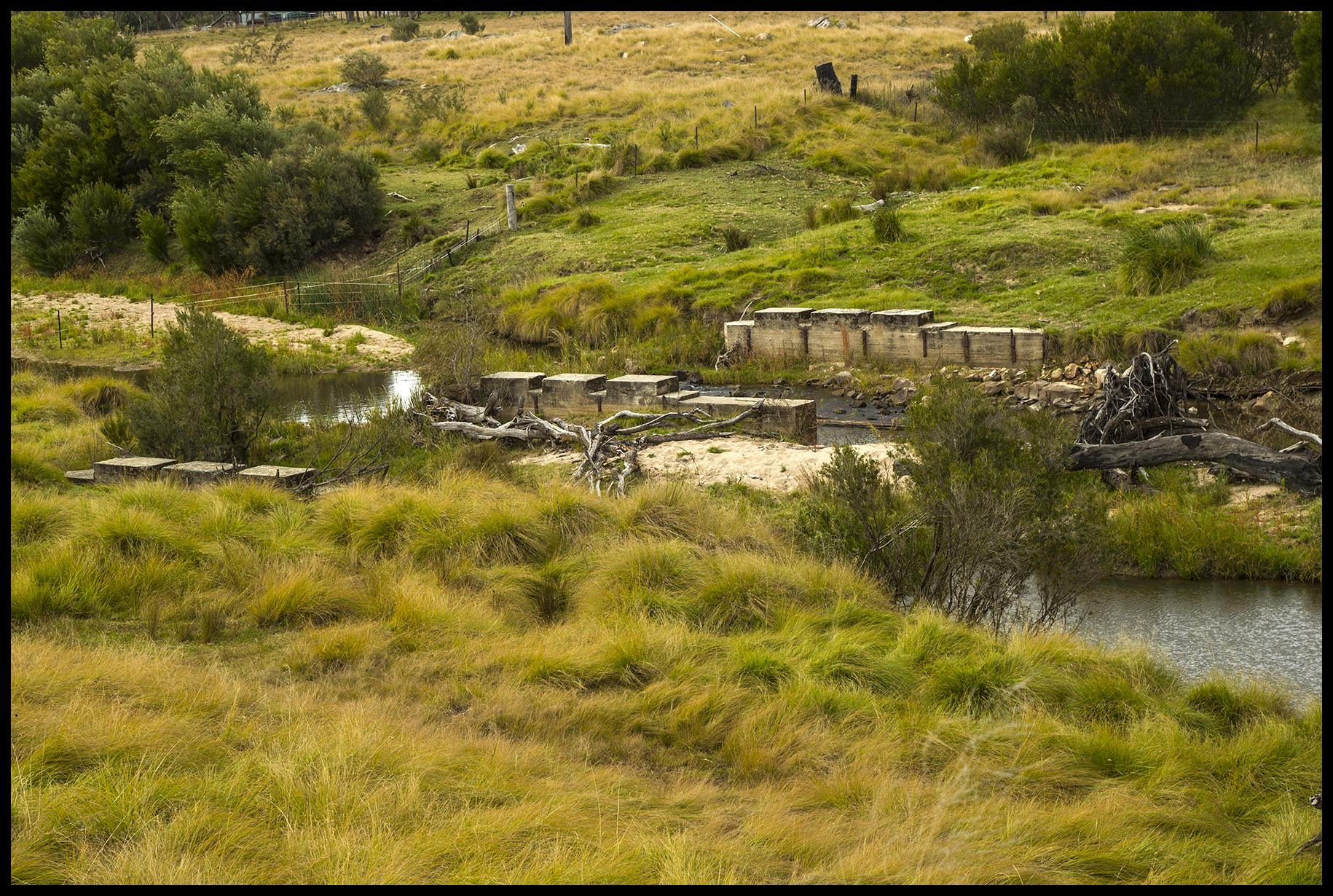
Tenterfield Creek

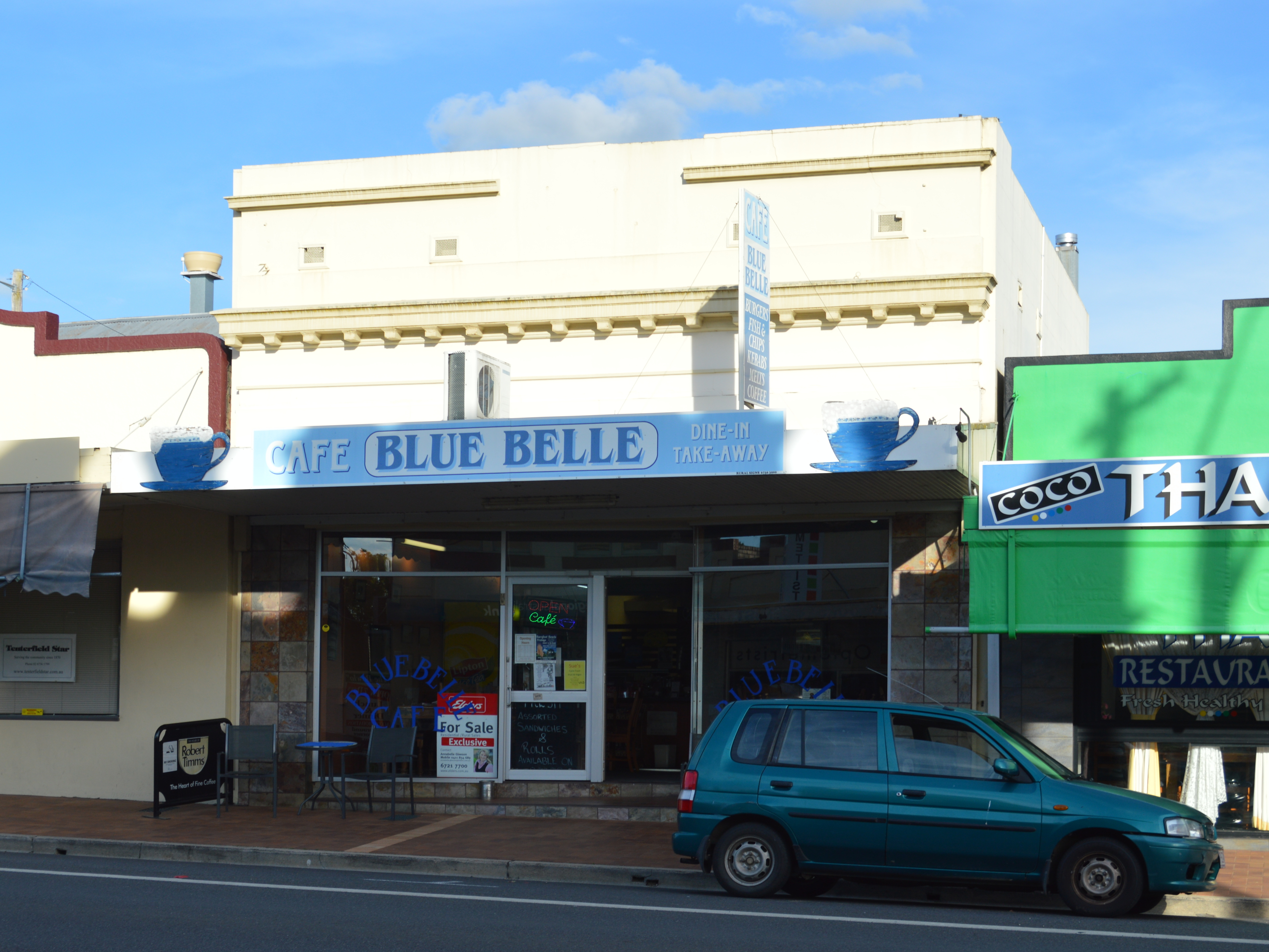
Blue Belle Café

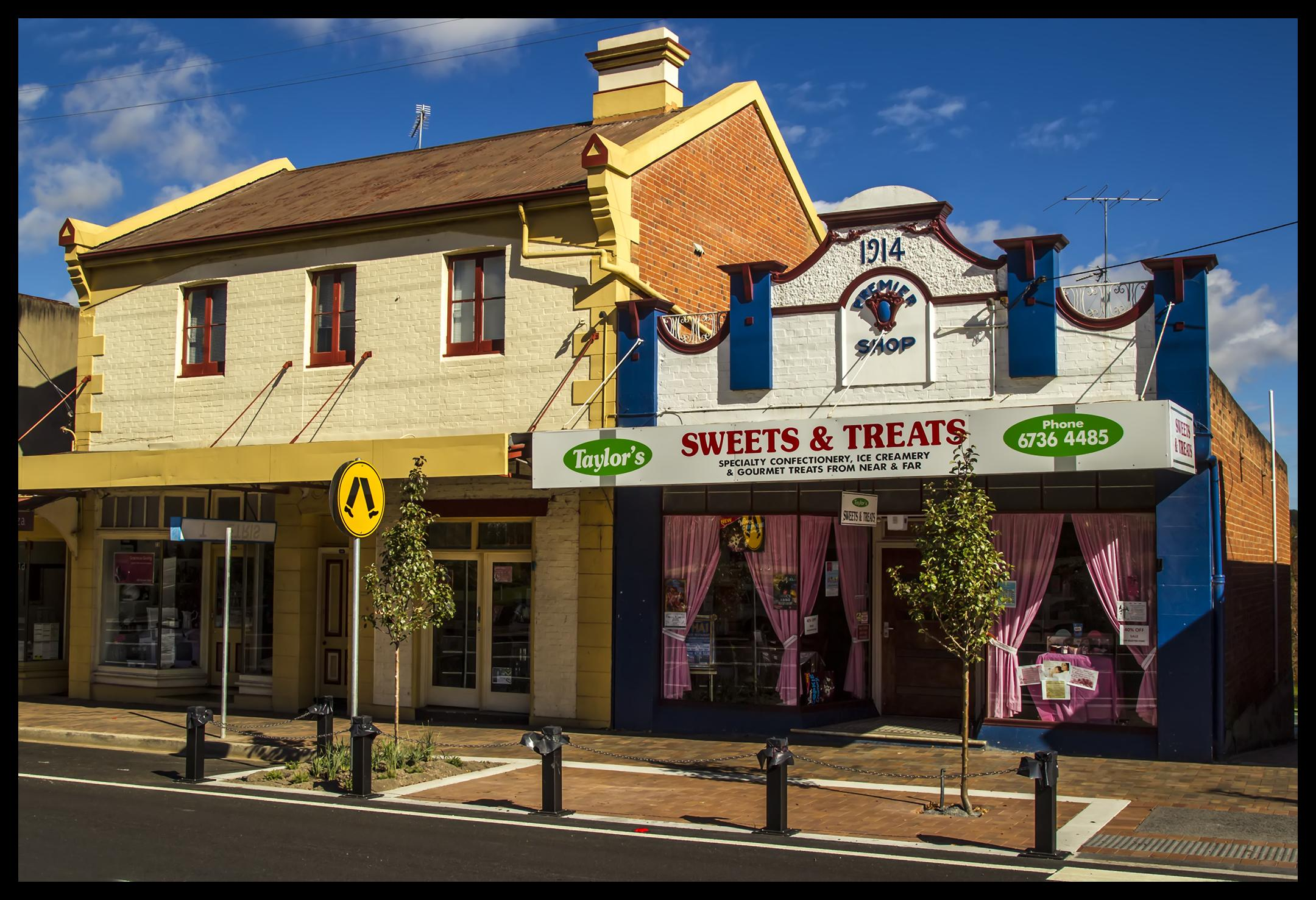
Shops in Tenterfield

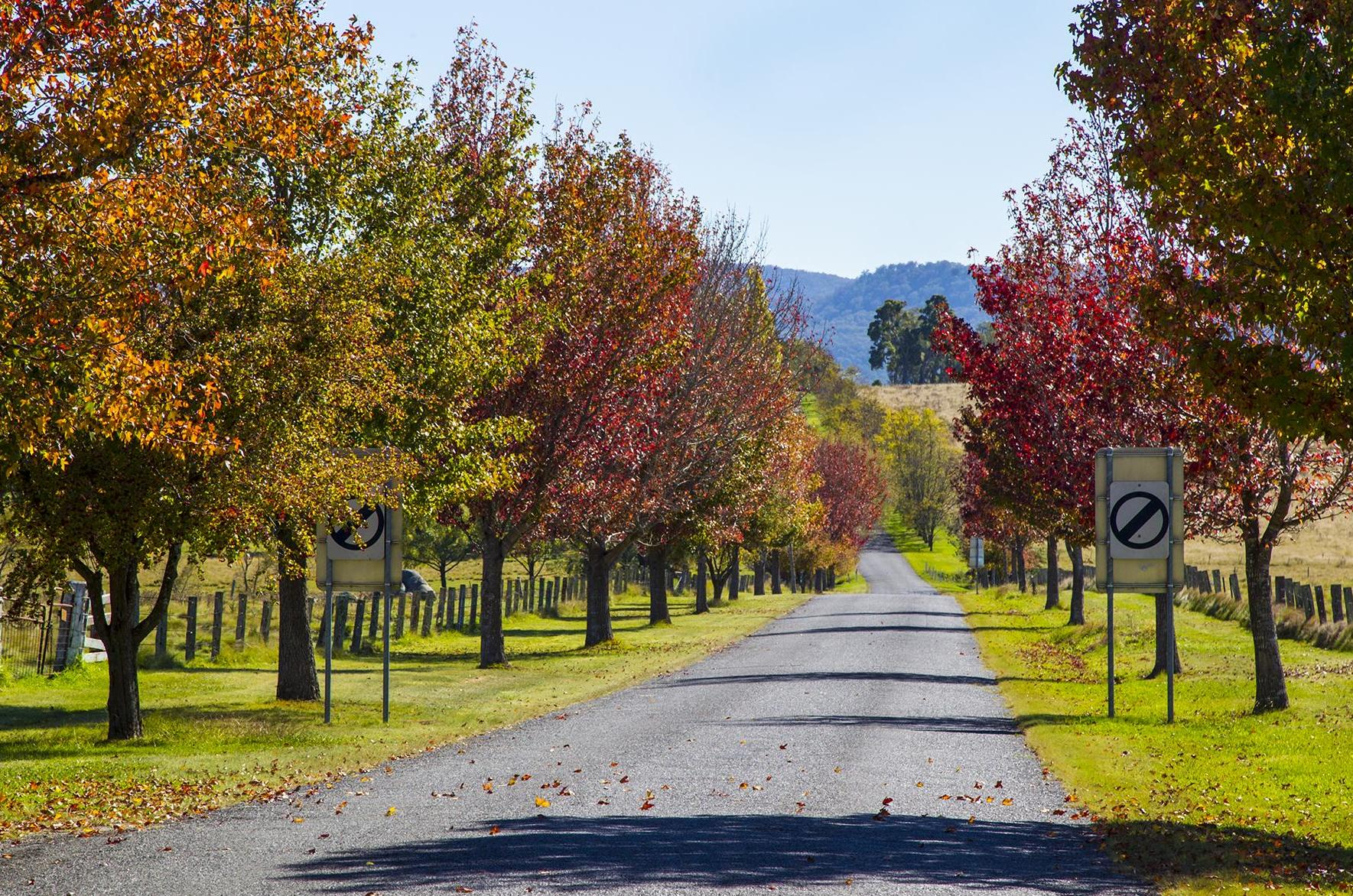
Autumn colours

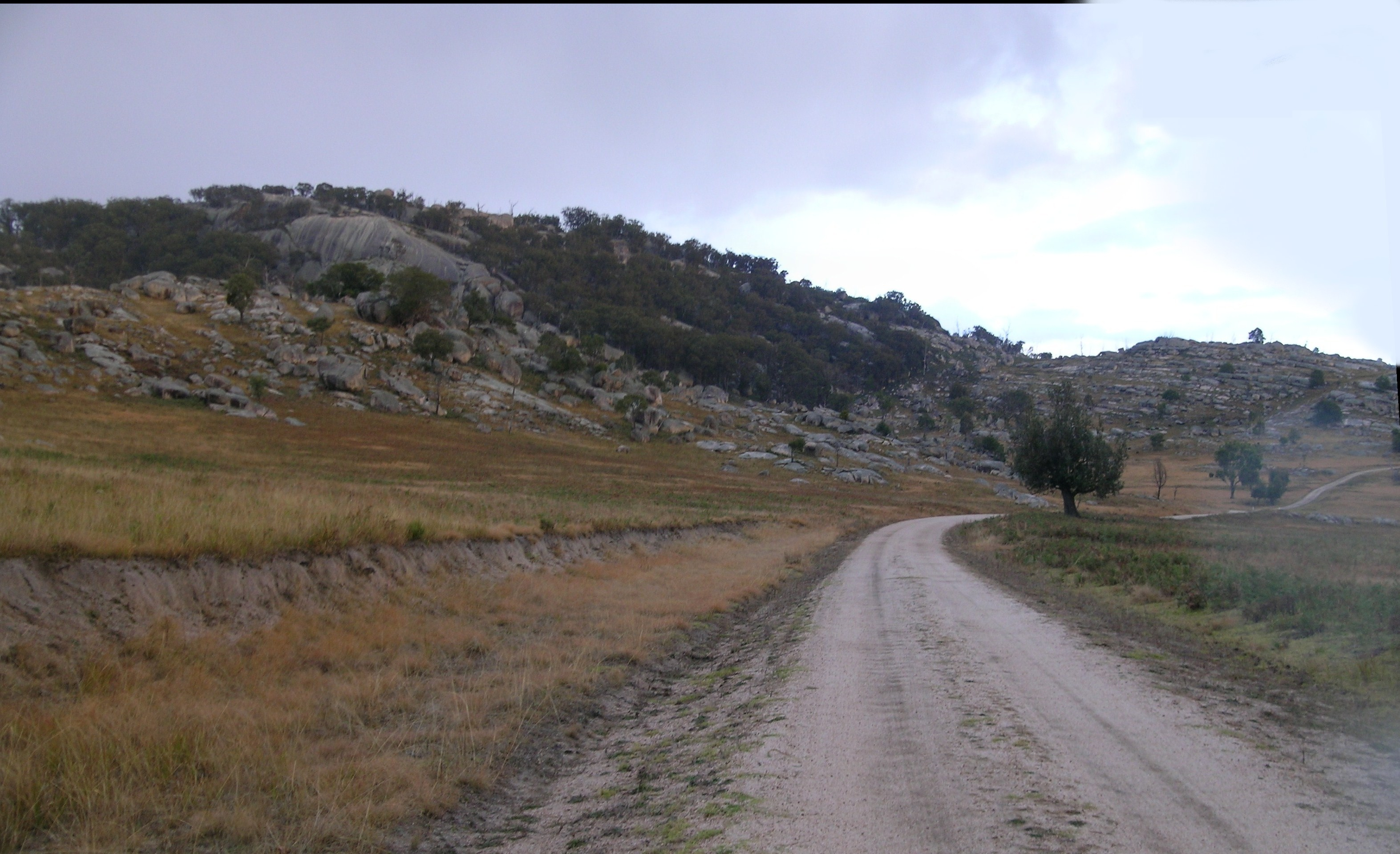
Granite boulders on Kildare Road, Tenterfield

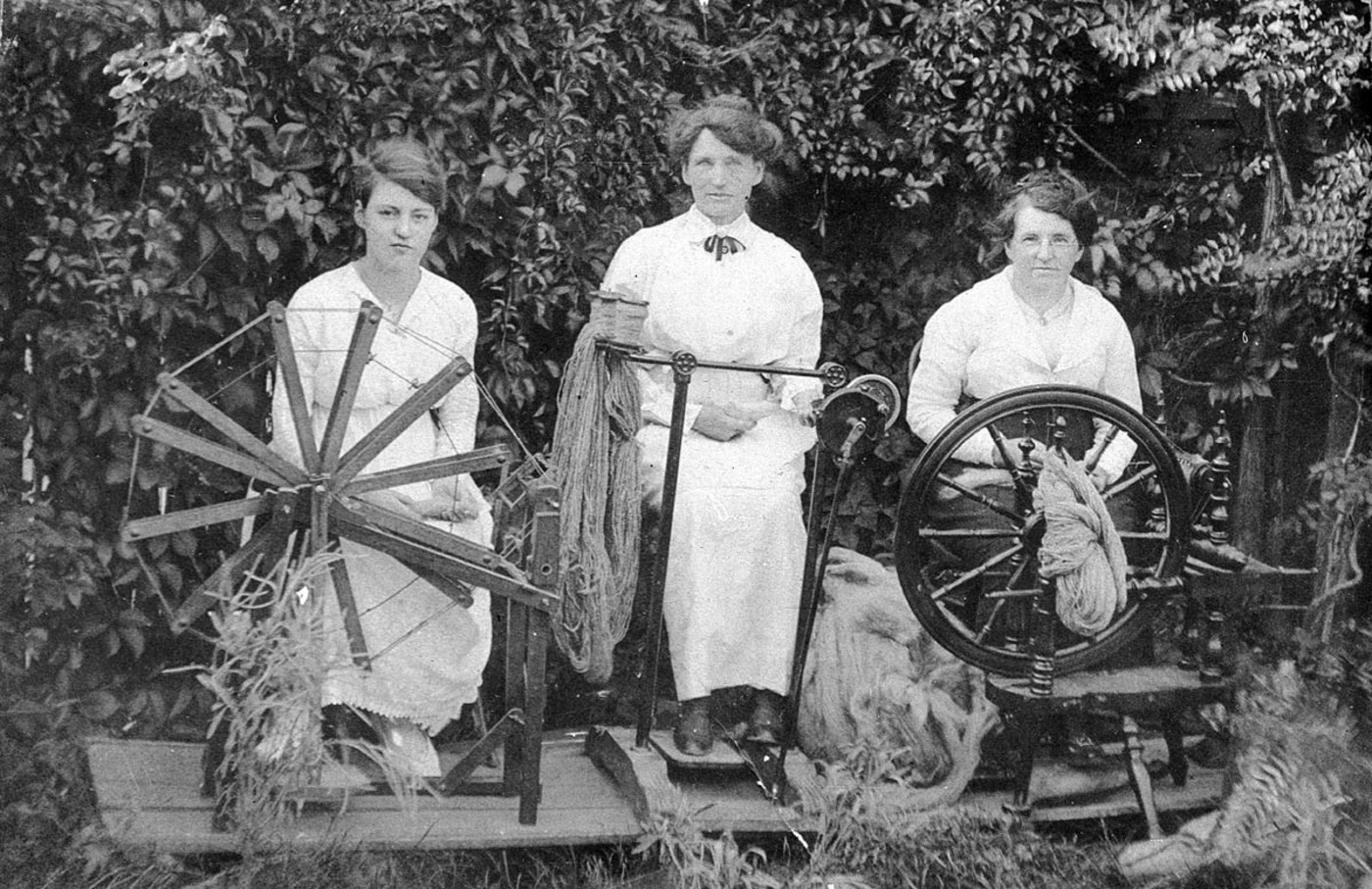
Spinning wool to knit socks for soldiers during World War I 1915

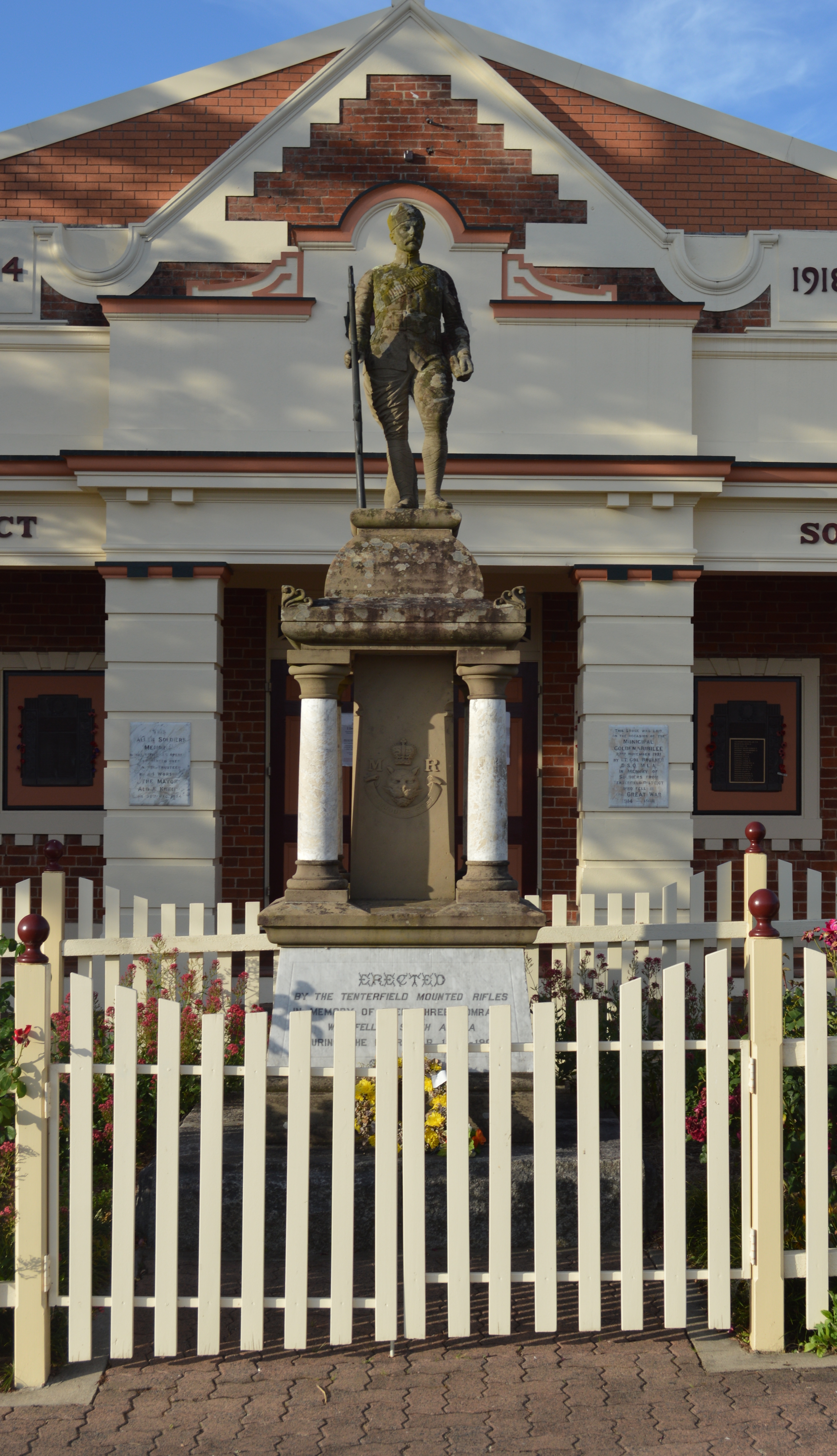
Boer War Memorial

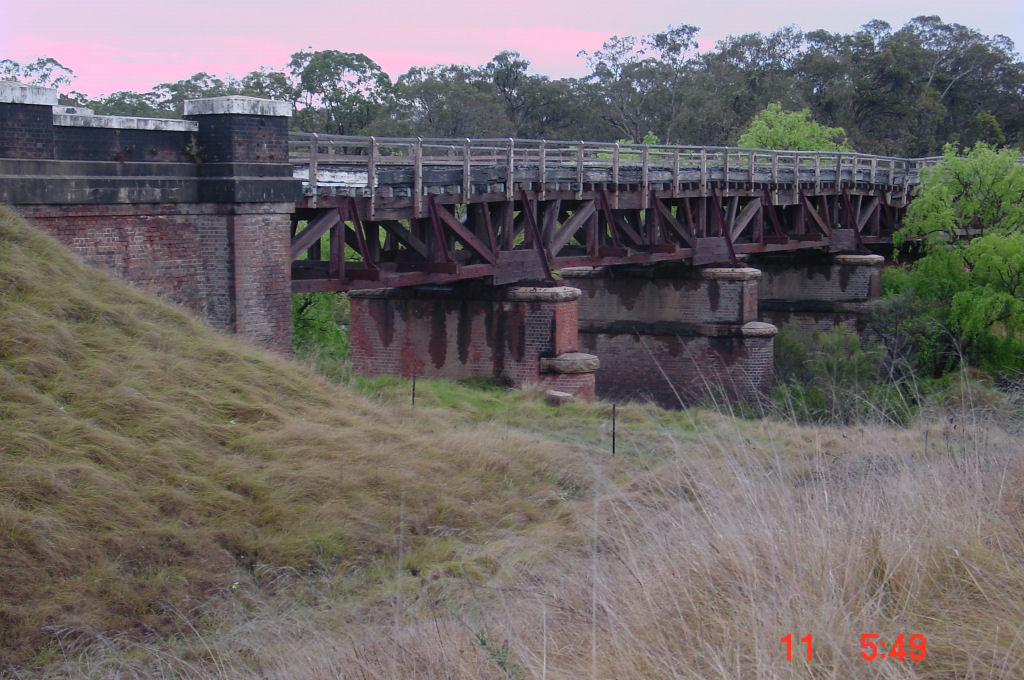
Rail bridge

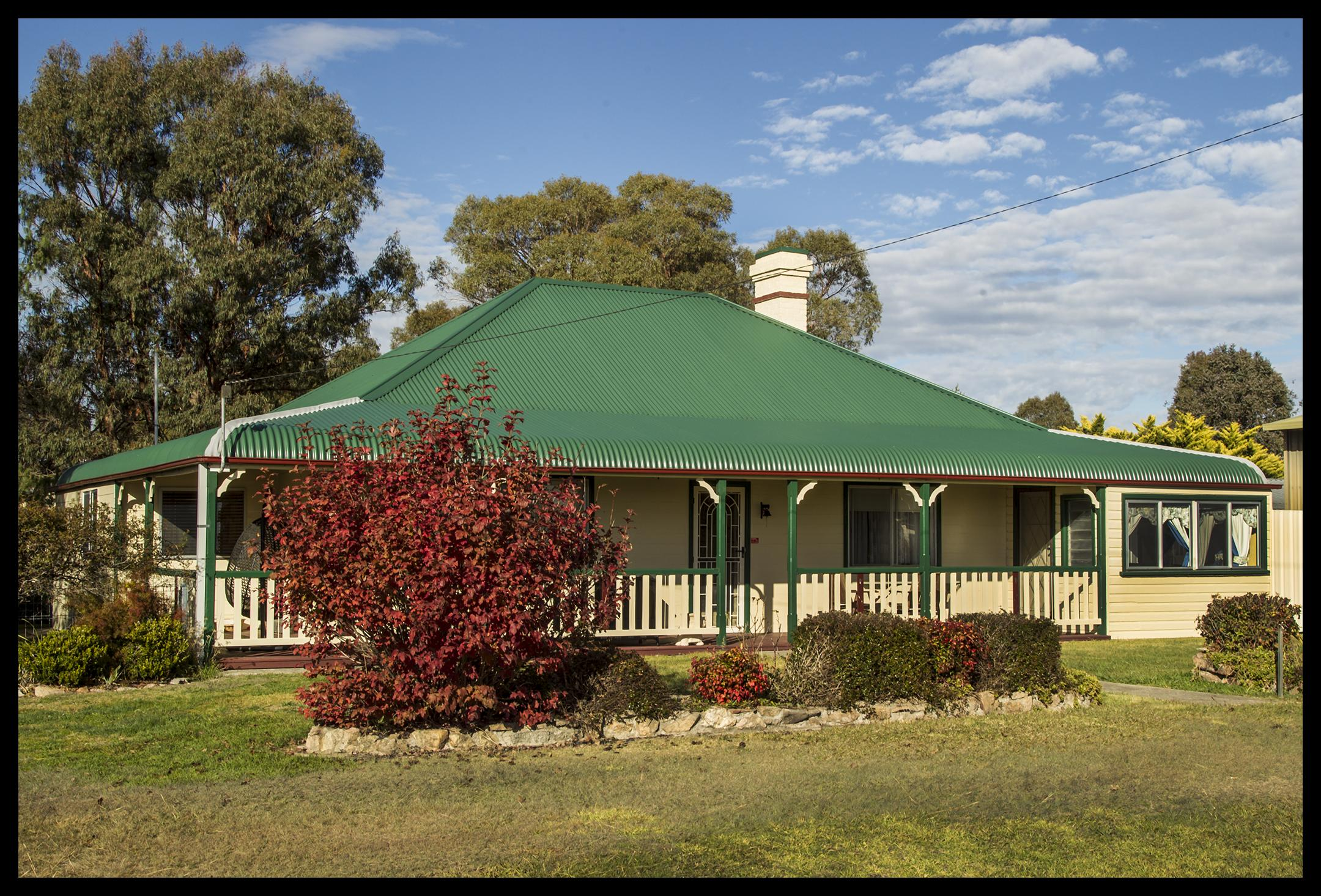
House in Tenterfield

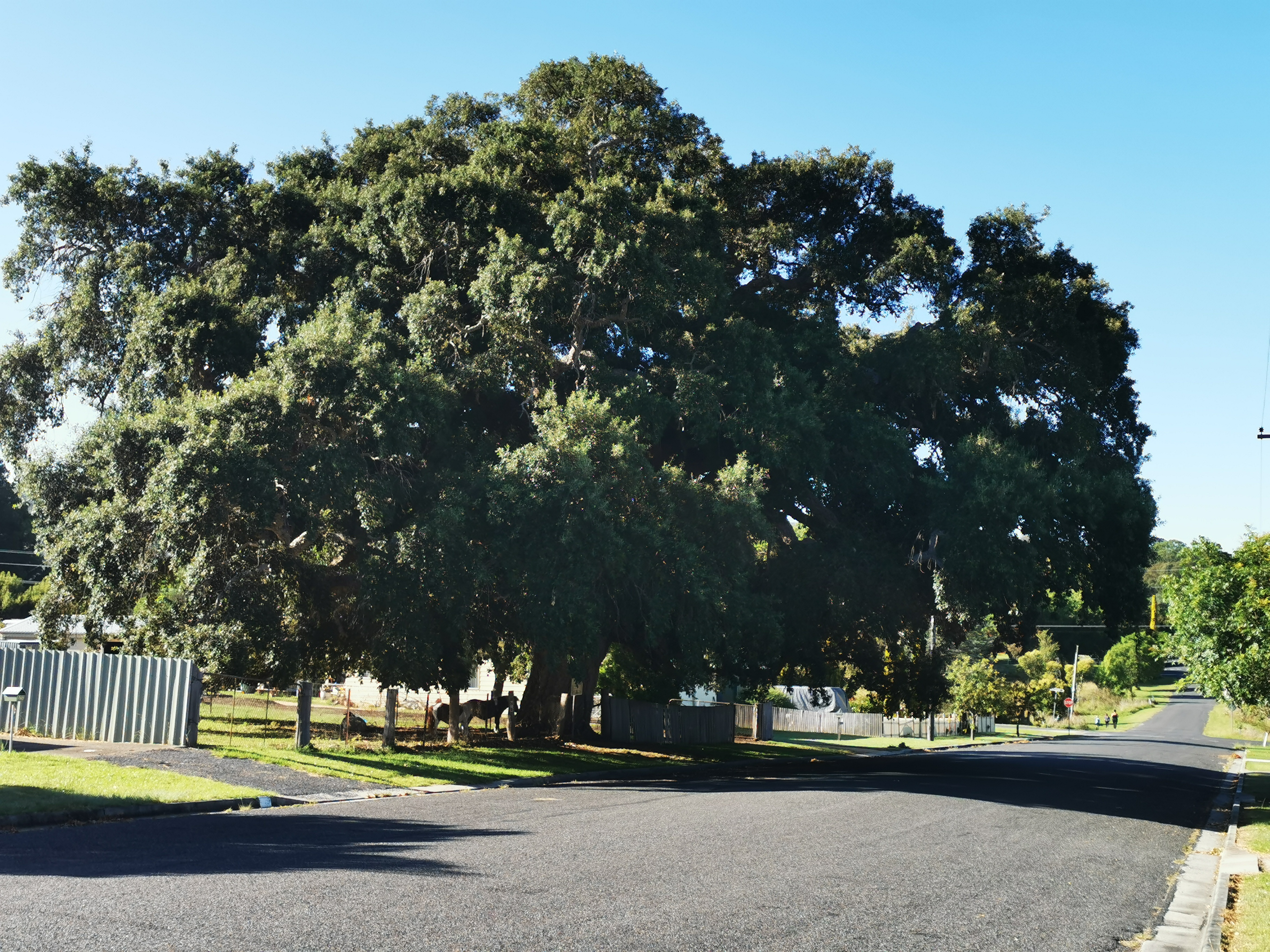
Edward Parker's 1861 Cork Tree

== See also ==
- High Conservation Value Old Growth forest
- Federation of Australia
- Sir Henry Parkes
- Tenterfield Saddler
