= The Tenterfield Star =

- City: Tenterfield, New South Wales
- Country: Australia
- Website: www.tenterfieldstar.com.au

The Tenterfield Star, previously published as The Tenterfield Star and New England Chronicle and The Tenterfield Record and Border Advertiser, is a weekly English language newspaper published in Tenterfield, New South Wales, Australia. It is owned by Australian Community Media.

== History ==
Publication of The Tenterfield Star began 10 August 1871, published by Duncan M'Master Cameron. It continues The Tenterfield Star and New England Chronicle, published by Christopher Bentley, and absorbed The Tenterfield Record and Border Advertiser, published by Frederick Samuel Grey from 16 January 1885 until approximately 1890.

The Tenterfield Star was owned and operated in the late 1890s by Major J.F. Thomas, the solicitor who defended Harry "Breaker" Morant. The newspaper also played a part during this period in the Federation of Australia.

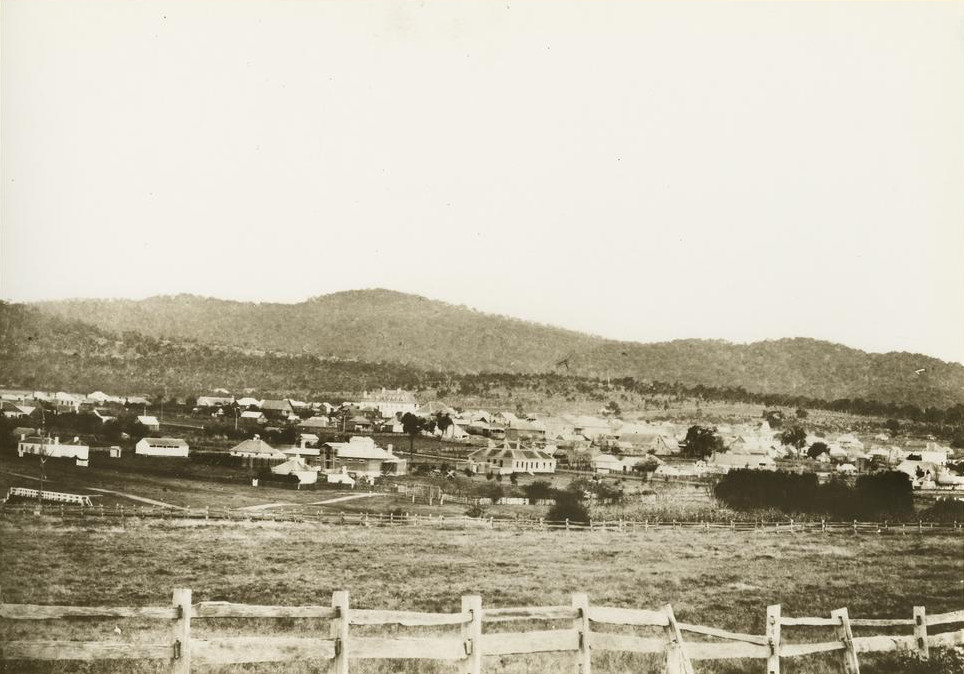
View of Tenterfield, New South Wales, 1887

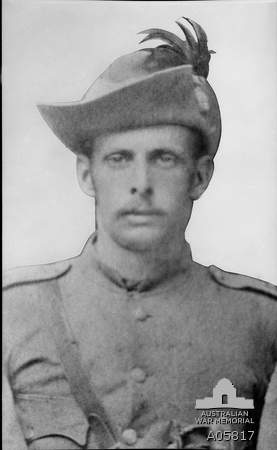
2nd Lieutenant James Francis Thomas (1899)

The Tenterfield Star was purchased by Rural Press Limited, which then merged with Fairfax Media in April 2007. It celebrated its 140th anniversary in 2010. During the early 20th century the Star’s editor was longtime local journalist Lisa Finnerty. Following Lisa’s death in 2010, Marie Low was the paper’s editor until 2013. From 2013 until 2023 the editor was Laurie Bullock.

In September 2024, Australian Community Media announced it would shutter the paper. As of March 2025, however, it is still in print.

== See also ==
- List of newspapers in Australia
- List of newspapers in New South Wales
