= Weekley (surname) =

Weekley is a surname. Notable people with the surname include:

- Boo Weekley (born 1973), American professional golfer
- Ernest Weekley (1865–1954), British philologist
- Frieda Weekley (1879–1956), German translator
- Jim Weekley (born 1947), American politician
