= The Very Best of Peter Allen =

Greatest hits album by Peter Allen
- Released: July 1982
- Recorded: 1971–1982
- Genre: Pop; stage and screen
- Label: Festival; A&M
- Producer: Marvin Hamlisch; Mike Post

Peter Allen chronology
Bi-Coastal (1980)	The Very Best of Peter Allen (1982)	Not the Boy Next Door (1983)

The Very Best of Peter Allen is the first compilation album released by Australian singer-songwriter Peter Allen. It was released in July 1982 through A&M Records, completing his deal with the label. The album peaked at number nine on the Australian Kent Music Report. The album was re-titled, The Best in the United States, with an altered track listing.

== Background ==
The Very Best of Peter Allen is a compilation album by Australian-born singer-songwriter Peter Allen, which was issued in 1982. According to Australian musicologist, Ian McFarlane, Allen's most famous songs during his career were "I Go to Rio", "I Honestly Love You", "Don't Cry Out Loud" and "I Still Call Australia Home".

== Reception ==
Professional ratings
Review scores
Source	Rating
Allmusic	4.5/5 stars

== Track listing ==
The Very Best of Peter Allen Festival Records (C52012), A & M Records (393 207-4)

Side A
No.	Title	Writer(s)	Album	Length
1.	"I Go to Rio"	Peter Allen, Adrienne Anderson	Taught by Experts (1976)	3:17
2.	"Don't Wish too Hard"	Allen, Carole Bayer Sager	I Could Have Been a Sailor (1979)	5:14
3.	"Quiet Please, There's a Lady on Stage"	Allen, Sager	Taught by Experts (1976)	5:13
4.	"I Honestly Love You"	Allen, Jeff Barry	Continental American (1974)	3:32
5.	"Fly Away"	Allen, David Foster, Sager	Bi-Coastal (1980)	4:01
6.	"One Step Over the Borderline"	Allen	Bi-Costal (1980)	3:54
7.	"Don't Cry Out Loud"	Allen, Sager	I Could Have Been a Sailor (1979)	4:07
8.	"Everything Old Is New Again"	Allen, Sager	Continental American (1974)	2:35

Side B
No.	Title	Writer(s)	Album	Length
1.	"Tenterfield Saddler"	Allen	Tenterfield Saddler (1972)	4:08
2.	"I Could Have Been a Sailor"	Allen	I Could Have Been a Sailor (1979)	3:55
3.	"Bi-coastal"	Allen, Tom Kean, Foster	Bi-coastal (1980)	5:13
4.	"The More I See You"	Harry Warren	Taught by Experts (1976)	3:30
5.	"I'd Rather Leave While I'm in Love"	Allen, Sager	I Could Have Been a Sailor (1979)	3:38
6.	"She Loves to Hear the Music"	Allen	Taught by Experts (1976)	3:26
7.	"Just Ask Me I've Been There"	Allen	Continental American (1974)	4:07
8.	"I Still Call Australia Home"	Allen	Bi-Costal (1980)	2:35

== Charts ==
Chart (1982)	Peak position
Australian (Kent Music Report)	9

== Certifications ==
Region	Certification	Certified units/sales
Australia (ARIA)	Gold	20,000^{^}
^{^} Shipments figures based on certification alone.
