= The Boy from Oz =

Australian 1998 musical about Peter Allen

- Original Broadway poster
- Music: Peter Allen
- Lyrics: Peter Allen
- Book: Nick Enright (Australian musical version); Martin Sherman (Broadway)
- Basis: The Boy from Oz (1996), biography by Stephen MacLean
- Productions: 1998 Sydney; 2003 Broadway; 2006 Australian arena tour 2013 Lima, Perú; 2018 Melbourne; 2021 Perth

The Boy from Oz is an Australian jukebox musical based on the life of singer and songwriter Peter Allen, featuring songs written by him. The book commissioned for the musical is by Nick Enright, based on Stephen MacLean's 1996 biography of Allen. Premiering in Australia in 1998 starring Todd McKenney, a revised version of the musical, written by Martin Sherman, opened on Broadway in 2003, with Hugh Jackman in the title role.

At the ARIA Music Awards of 1998 the cast recording won the ARIA Award for Best Original Soundtrack, Cast or Show Album.

== Plot ==
This synopsis applies to the North American production.

Act I

The musical begins with Australian performer Peter Allen recalling his life story, coming to terms with who he was ("The Lives of Me"). Afterwards, we go back to Allen's childhood in Tenterfield, Australia, where a young boy named Peter Woolnough is performing in local bars for money ("When I Get My Name in Lights"). Peter grows up and joins with Chris Bell to become the Allen Brothers, and they perform in Australian Bandstand ("Love Crazy"). After great success in Australia, the Allen Brothers perform in a Hong Kong Hilton hotel to Chinese businessmen. One evening, another person is watching them from the bar: the legendary The Wizard of Oz star Judy Garland. Peter convinces Judy to perform with them ("All I Wanted Was the Dream"), and Judy takes Peter to be the opening act in her concert in New York ("Only an Older Woman").

While in New York, Peter is introduced to Judy's daughter, Liza Minnelli, and they fall in love ("Best That You Can Do"). There are rumors of Peter's homosexuality, and Judy warns Liza ("Don't Wish Too Hard"). Liza gives no attention to her warning and marries Peter ("Come Save Me").

Peter makes some mistakes, and at one of his all night parties, Liza walks in on him ("Continental American"), further fueling her suspicions that he is gay. Liza is working hard to get her career going ("She Loves to Hear the Music"), in contrast to Peter's excessive lifestyle. Judy dies, and Peter honors her ("Quiet Please, There's a Lady on Stage"). Liza's world comes crashing down as a result of her mother's death.

Liza confronts Peter on his alleged homosexuality, and their marriage ends ("I'd Rather Leave While I'm in Love"). Peter returns to Australia but realizes that he is not who people thought he was ("Not the Boy Next Door").

Act II

Back in the US, Peter has gone solo and comes to terms with his bisexuality ("Bi-Coastal"). He meets the hardworking fashion model Gregory Connell. Greg does not want to be a part of Peter's life in show business, but he falls in love with Peter ("If You Were Wondering"). They soon get discovered by music producer Dee Anthony, and he gets them a gig at the Copacabana in New York ("Sure Thing Baby"). Peter's career takes off, and he wins an Oscar for "Best That You Can Do", in addition to writing songs that were covered by artists Olivia Newton-John and Frank Sinatra. Peter gives his best performance in the Radio City Music Hall with The Rockettes ("Everything Old is New Again"), and is surprised to know his mother is also in love.

Greg becomes stricken with advanced HIV, (then known as AIDS defining illness), and even though Peter tries to help him carry on, he succumbs to his illness ("Love Don't Need a Reason"). Peter also becomes sick with advanced HIV, but Greg's spirit urges him to carry on ("I Honestly Love You"). Liza offers her support to Peter, and they both realize they had successful lives and careers without each other ("You and Me").

Peter returns to Australia and tries to tell his mother about his illness, but ultimately can't find a way to tell her. He then performs one last magnificent concert for Australia ("I Still Call Australia Home"), and witnesses a last flashback of his mother's love for him ("Don't Cry Out Loud"). Peter reflects on his life, realizing he has no regrets, before he ultimately succumbs to his disease ("Once Before I Go"), but not before going out in style with a farewell performance ("I Go to Rio"), joined by the entire cast.

== Production history ==
=== Script ===
Stephen MacLean idolised Allen, followed his career all over the world, interviewed him many times, and filmed his Australian solo cabaret debut. After Allen's death in 1992, MacLean started work on his biography of Allen, which was published in 1996, entitled Peter Allen: The Boy from Oz, (alternative title The Boy from Oz: The Peter Allen Story).

While working on the biography, MacLean suggested making a biographical film about Allen to producer Ben Gannon, having previously alerted Gannon to Allen's work back in the early 1970s. Gannon, however, thought that a documentary should come first, and produced The Boy from Oz, written and directed by MacLean. This screened on ABC Television in 1995.

After the biography was published in 1996, Gannon and Robert Fox decided to use the work as the basis for a stage musical. The book to be used for the show was commissioned from Nick Enright, and MacLean acted as consultant on workshopping the musical.

=== Original Australian production ===
The Boy from Oz had its world premiere, directed by Gale Edwards, at Her Majesty's Theatre, Sydney, Sydney on 5 March 1998 and toured Brisbane, Melbourne, Adelaide and Perth, playing to over 1.2 million theatre patrons. It ran for a total 766 performances over two years. The production starred Todd McKenney as Allen and Divinyls frontwoman Chrissy Amphlett as Judy Garland, Angela Toohey as Liza Minnelli, and introduced Mathew Waters as Young Peter.

=== Broadway ===
The Boy from Oz began previews on Broadway at the Imperial Theatre on 16 September 2003 and opened on 16 October 2003. It closed on 12 September 2004, at the end of Hugh Jackman's contract. It was adapted for the American audience by playwright Martin Sherman, who removed some of the Australian terms (such as "jackaroo") and expanded the role of U.S. characters Garland and Minnelli. The musical played 32 previews and 365 performances. Directed by Philip William McKinley, with choreography by Joey McKneely, it starred Jackman as Allen, Isabel Keating as Garland, Stephanie J. Block as Minnelli, Beth Fowler as Marion, Jarrod Emick as Greg, and John Hill as Mark Herron (Judy's husband). Jackman won the 2004 Tony Award for Best Leading Actor in a Musical and the Drama Desk Award for Outstanding Actor in a Musical, and Keating won the Drama Desk Award for Outstanding Featured Actress in a Musical. The show also received nominations for four other Tony Awards, including Best Musical. The musical recouped its investment of $8.25 million.

=== Australian arena tour ===
The Boy from Oz returned to Australia from 3 August to 10 September 2006 in a new production especially designed for the arena stage (audiences of over 10,000 people), called Boy from Oz Arena Spectacular. Directed by American choreographer Kenny Ortega, Hugh Jackman reprised his New York role as Allen. He was joined by Australian actresses Chrissy Amphlett and Angela Toohey, reprising their roles as Garland and Minnelli. Shardyn Fahey-Leigh played the role of Young Allen with Dylan Speedy. Rarmian Newton and Joshua Waiss Gates, both of whom later starred in Billy Elliot the Musical, were understudies in the Australian production. Peter's mother, Marion, was played by Colleen Hewett. The show had a support cast of 40 singer-dancers and a 25-piece orchestra.

The show also featured the vocals of Australian girls' high school choirs from Penrhos College when in Perth, and, while in Sydney, Melbourne, Adelaide and Brisbane, it featured the vocals of 100 girls from the Australian Girls Choir.

=== Melbourne revivals ===
In 2010, McKenney returned to the title role with The Production Company in a version of the show that climaxed with an Allen recording projected on the stage. In 2018, to celebrate the show's twentieth anniversary, The Production Company staged a new production with anachronistic elements such as Aboriginal and rainbow flags. Rohan Browne starred as Allen, with Caroline O’Connor as Garland, Loren Hunter as Minnelli, and Maxwell Simon as Greg.

=== Perth production ===
In 2021, Platinum Entertainment presented "The Boy From Oz" at Crown Theatre - one of the only venues in the world producing large scale theatre at the time. Directed and choreographed by Drew Anthony, and musically directed by Joe Louis Robinson, the show debuted Ethan Jones in the title role of Allen alongside Lucy Williamson as Garland, Elethea Sartorelli as Minnelli, Casey Edwards as Marion, and Peter Cumins as Greg. An acknowledgement of country was presented by Jones as Allen in the introduction to "I Still Call Australia Home". The production included a full stage LED screen with integrated audio-visuals throughout, and concluded with a transition from Jones to the late Allen singing "Once Before I Go".

=== International productions ===
In Peru, the show premiered in May 2013, starring Marco Zunino as Allen, Érika Villalobos appeared as Liza and Elena Romero as Judy . It was the first Spanish language adaptation.

A Japanese production played in 2005, 2006 and 2008. The production restaged in 2022, with almost the same cast as before.

== Musical numbers ==
Original run

All songs written by Allen except as noted

Act I

Song	Performer(s)	Composers	Source
Not the Boy Next Door	Peter and Trio		Not the Boy Next Door
If You Were Wondering	Peter		I Could Have Been a Sailor
Name in Lights	Young Peter and Ensemble		Legs Diamond
Pretty Keen Teen	Peter, Chris Bell and Ensemble	The Allen Brothers	
All I Wanted Was the Dream	Judy Garland		Legs Diamond
Only an Older Woman	Judy, Peter, Chris and Mark		Legs Diamond
Don't Wish Too Hard	Ensemble	Allen (music), Sager (lyrics)	I Could Have Been a Sailor
Somebody's Angel	Trio		Bi-Coastal
Sure Thing Baby	Liza Minnelli		Legs Diamond
Quiet Please	Peter, Liza, Judy and Ensemble	Allen (music), Sager (lyrics)	Taught by Experts
I'd Rather Leave While I'm in Love	Liza	Allen (music), Sager (lyrics)	I Could Have Been a Sailor
Bi-Coastal	Trio	Allen, David Foster, Tom Keane	Bi-Coastal
Taught by Experts	Judy and Peter		Taught by Experts
Name in Lights (Reprise)	Young Peter and Ensemble		Legs Diamond
Not the Boy Next Door (Reprise)	Peter and Trio		Not the Boy Next Door

Act II

Song	Performer(s)	Composers	Source
When Everything Old is New Again	Peter and The Rockettes	Allen (music), Sager (lyrics)	Continental American
Best That You Can Do	Liza and Peter	Allen, Burt Bacharach, Carole Bayer Sager, Christopher Cross	Arthur
Love Don't Need a Reason	Peter and Trio	Allen, Michael Callen, Marsha Malamet	Making Every Moment Count
She Loves to Hear the Music	Trio	Allen (music), Sager (lyrics)	Taught by Experts
Fly Away	Peter		Bi-Coastal
I Honestly Love You	Greg	Allen, Jeff Barry	Continental American
I Still Call Australia Home	Peter and Ensemble		Bi-Coastal
Legs Diamond Opener/Name in Lights (Reprise)	Peter/Young Peter and Ensemble		Legs Diamond
Don't Cry Out Loud	Marion	Allen (music), Sager (lyrics)	I Could Have Been a Sailor
Tenterfield Saddler	Peter		Tenterfield Saddler
I Go to Rio	Peter and Company	Allen, Anderson	Taught by Experts
Once Before I Go	Peter		Not the Boy Next Door

Broadway

All songs written by Allen except as noted

Act I

Song	Performer(s)	Composers	Source
The Lives of Me	Peter		Peter Allen, 1971 self-titled album
When I Get My Name in Lights	Boy and Ensemble		Legs Diamond
When I Get My Name in Lights (Reprise)	Peter		Legs Diamond
Love Crazy	Chris Bell, Peter and Ensemble	Allen, Adrienne Anderson	It Is Time for Peter Allen, live album
Waltzing Matilda (in Mandarin)	Peter and Chris	Banjo Patterson	
All I Wanted Was the Dream	Judy		Legs Diamond
Only an Older Woman	Judy, Peter, Chris and Mark		Legs Diamond
Best That You Can Do	Peter and Liza	Allen, Burt Bacharach, Carole Bayer Sager, Christopher Cross	Arthur
Don't Wish Too Hard	Judy	Allen (music), Sager (lyrics)	I Could Have Been a Sailor
Come Save Me	Liza and Peter		Legs Diamond (cut)
Continental American	Peter and Ensemble	Allen (music), Sager (lyrics)	Continental American
She Loves to Hear the Music	Liza and Ensemble	Allen (music), Sager (lyrics)	Taught by Experts
Quiet Please, There's a Lady on Stage	Peter and Judy	Allen (music), Sager (lyrics)	Taught by Experts
I'd Rather Leave While I'm in Love	Liza and Peter	Allen (music), Sager (lyrics)	I Could Have Been a Sailor
Not the Boy Next Door	Peter and Marion	Allen (music), Dean Pitchford (lyrics)	Not the Boy Next Door

Act II

Song	Performer(s)	Composers	Source
Bi-Coastal	Peter and Trio	Allen, David Foster, Tom Keane	Bi-Coastal
If You Were Wondering	Peter and Greg		I Could Have Been a Sailor
Sure Thing Baby	Dee Anthony, Greg, Peter, Trio and Male Ensemble		Legs Diamond
Everything Old is New Again	Peter and The Rockettes	Allen (music), Sager (lyrics)	Continental American
Everything Old is New Again (Reprise)	Marion, Dee and Greg	Allen (music), Sager (lyrics)	Continental American
Love Don't Need a Reason	Peter and Greg	Allen, Michael Callen, Marsha Malamet	Making Every Moment Count
I Honestly Love You	Greg	Allen, Jeff Barry	Continental American
You and Me	Liza and Peter	Allen (music), Sager (lyrics)	Not the Boy Next Door
I Still Call Australia Home	Peter and Ensemble		Bi-Coastal
Don't Cry Out Loud	Marion	Allen (music), Sager (lyrics)	I Could Have Been a Sailor
Once Before I Go	Peter		Not the Boy Next Door
I Go to Rio	Peter and Company	Allen, Anderson	Taught by Experts

== Reception ==
In his review of the Broadway production for The New York Times, Ben Brantley wrote, "His limbs twirling like the blades of a windmill, Mr. Jackman channels the energy that was Allen with a rejuvenating life force all his own. And you don’t feel — as you so often do with such interpretations — that your memories of the prototype have been blurred. This is a performance that, against the odds, holds on to its integrity." However, Brantley went on to write: "...this musical settles for a staleness and a hollowness that even Mr. Jackman's blazing presence can't disguise."

In his review for Variety of the Broadway production, Charles Isherwood praised Jackman but panned the show: "Jackman is giving a vital and engaging performance in this pitifully flimsy musical almost in spite of the material he’s been handed. It’s a sad waste of an exciting talent."

David Rooney, writing in Variety about the Australian arena tour, said, "When he first performed the role on Broadway in 2003, Hugh Jackman’s charisma, vitality and breezy confidence onstage far outshone the narrative or emotional scope of the by-the-numbers biomusical of singer-songwriter Peter Allen. The scales have been tipped even further toward the performer in this pumped-up reconfiguration of the show, playing state capitals in venues of 10,000 seats or more. It’s as much a concert platform for a returning local boy made good in Hollywood as it is a life story of Peter Allen. And that’s no bad thing."

=== In popular culture ===
Jackman's performance of "Once Before I Go" was featured in a montage dedicated to Alex Trebek in his final episode of Jeopardy!, which aired on January 8, 2021, exactly two months after Trebek's death from stage IV pancreatic cancer on November 8, 2020 at the age of 80. (Note: Originally scheduled to air on December 25, 2020.)

== Awards and nominations ==
=== Original Australian production ===
Year	Award Ceremony	Category	Nominee	Result
2001	Helpmann Awards	Best Musical		Won
2001	Helpmann Awards	Best New Australian Work	Nick Enright	Nominated
2001	Helpmann Awards	Best Direction of a Musical	Gale Edwards	Won
2001	Helpmann Awards	Best Choreography in a Musical	Anthony Van Laast	Nominated
2001	Helpmann Awards	Best Male Actor in a Musical	Todd McKenney	Won
2001	Helpmann Awards	Best Female Actor in a Musical	Chrissy Amphlett	Nominated
2001	Helpmann Awards	Best Musical Direction	Max Lambert	Won
2001	Helpmann Awards	Best Sound Design	Wyn Milsom	Nominated

The original Australian production was also received six Melbourne Green Room Awards for 1999, including Outstanding Contribution by a Music Theatre Management. It was also nominated for the Green Room Award for Best New Australian Play.

=== Original Broadway production ===
Year	Award Ceremony	Category	Nominee	Result
2004	Tony Award	Best Musical		Nominated
2004	Tony Award	Best Book of a Musical	Martin Sherman and Nick Enright	Nominated
2004	Tony Award	Best Actor in a Musical	Hugh Jackman	Won
2004	Tony Award	Best Featured Actress in a Musical	Beth Fowler	Nominated
2004	Tony Award	Best Featured Actress in a Musical	Isabel Keating	Nominated
2004	Drama Desk Award	Outstanding Actor in a Musical	Hugh Jackman	Won
2004	Drama Desk Award	Outstanding Featured Actor in a Musical	Mitchel David Federan	Nominated
2004	Drama Desk Award	Outstanding Featured Actress in a Musical	Isabel Keating	Won
2004	Theatre World Award		Mitchel David Federan	Won
2004	Theatre World Award		Hugh Jackman	Won
2004	Theatre World Award		Isabel Keating	Won
