= The Ultimate Peter Allen =

Greatest hits album by Peter Allen
- Released: 22 July 2006
- Genre: Funk; soul; pop; disco
- Length: 79:25
- Label: Universal Music Australia

Peter Allen chronology
20th Century Masters: The Best of Peter Allen (2001)	The Ultimate Peter Allen (2006)

The Ultimate Peter Allen is a greatest hits album by Australian singer-songwriter Peter Allen, released in Australia in July 2006 through Universal Music Australia.

== Track listing ==
1. "Not the Boy Next Door" (Dean Pitchford, Peter Allen) – 6:55
2. "Don't Wish Too Hard" (Carole Bayer Sager, Allen) – 3:37
3. "Quiet Please, There's a Lady on Stage" (Sager, Allen) – 5:13
4. "I'd Rather Leave While I'm in Love" (Sager, Allen) – 3:40
5. "Everything Old Is New Again" (Sager, Allen) – 2:38
6. "I Honestly Love You" (Jeff Barry, Allen) – 3:36
7. "I Still Call Australia Home" (single version) (Allen) – 3:57
8. "Don't Cry Out Loud" (Sager, Allen) – 4:07
9. "Tenterfield Saddler" (album version) (Allen) – 3:35
10. "I Go to Rio" (album version) (Adrienne Anderson, Allen) – 3:23
11. "The More I See You" (album version) (Harry Warren, Mack Gordon) – 3:35
12. "One Step Over the Borderline" (album version) (David Foster, Allen, Tom Keane) – 3:47
13. "Bi-Coastal" (Foster, Allen, Keane) – 4:20
14. "She Loves to Hear Music" (album version) (Sager, Allen) – 3:21
15. "Once Before I Go" (Pitchford, Allen) – 4:24
16. "Continental American" (album version) (Sager, Allen) – 4:32
17. "Fly Away" (Sager, David Foster, Allen) – 3:59
18. "I Could Have Been a Sailor" (Allen) – 3:53
19. "Just Ask Me I've Been There" (album version) (Allen) – 3:33
20. "Love Crazy" (Anderson, Allen) – 3:18

== Charts ==
The Ultimate Peter Allen peaked at number 50 in 2006, but re-entered the charts at number 24 following the screening of the first part of the 2015 mini-series Peter Allen: Not the Boy Next Door. It peaked at number 18 following the screening of the second and final part.

=== Weekly charts ===
Chart (2015)	Peak position
Australian Albums (ARIA)	18

== Release history ==
Region	Date	Format	Edition(s)	Label	Catalogue
Australia	22 July 2006	CD	Standard	Universal Music Australia	9839914
