= The Very Best of Peter Allen: The Boy from Down Under =

Greatest hits album by Peter Allen
- Released: 14 August 1992
- Genre: Funk; soul; pop; disco
- Length: 79:39
- Label: A&M
- Producer: Richard Landis

Peter Allen chronology
Making Every Moment Count (1990)	The Very Best of Peter Allen: The Boy from Down Under (1992)	At His Best (1993)

The Very Best of Peter Allen: The Boy from Down Under is a greatest hits album by Australian singer-songwriter Peter Allen, released in Australia in August 1992 through A&M Records.

This album was released less than two months after Allen's death on 18 June 1992.

Allen wrote or co-wrote all but two of the tracks on the album.

== Reviews ==
Adrian Zupp of AllMusic gave the album 4.5 out of 5, stating; “His songwriting range [from] tender ballads through to poppier fare and even campy fun numbers, has rarely been rivaled…[and this album] captures the cream of Allen's career on one highly engaging disc.” Zupp concluded that “this album spans the moods and melodies that made Peter Allen such a special artist.”

== Track listing ==
1. "Honest Queen" (Peter Allen, Estelle Levitt) 3:16
2. "Tenterfield Saddler" (Album Version) (Peter Allen) 3:37
3. "Just Ask Me I've Been There" (Peter Allen) 4:23
4. "Everything Old Is New Again" (Carole Bayer Sager, Peter Allen) 2:35
5. "I Honestly Love You" (Jeff Barry, Peter Allen) 3:30
6. "She Loves to Hear Music" (Album Version) (Carole Bayer Sager, Peter Allen) 3:22
7. "I Go to Rio" (Album Version) (Adrienne Anderson, Peter Allen) 3:23
8. "Quiet Please, There's a Lady On Stage" (Carole Bayer Sager, Peter Allen) 5:14
9. "The More I See You" (Album Version) (Harry Warren, Mack Gordon) 3:35
10. "I Could Have Been a Sailor" (Peter Allen) 3:53
11. "Don't Wish Too Hard" (Carole Bayer Sager, Peter Allen) – 5:14
12. "Don't Cry Out Loud" (Carole Bayer Sager, Peter Allen) 4:09
13. "I'd Rather Leave While I'm in Love" (Carole Bayer Sager, Peter Allen) 3:40
14. "One Step Over the Borderline" (David Foster, Peter Allen, Tom Keane) 3:54
15. "Fly Away" (Carole Bayer Sager, David Foster, Peter Allen) 4:01
16. "Bi-Coastal" (David Foster, Peter Allen, Tom Keane) 4:23
17. "I Don’t Go Shopping" (Peter Allen, David Lasley) 4:35
18. "I Still Call Australia Home" (Single Version) (Peter Allen) 3:56
19. "You Haven’t Heard the Last of Me" (Eric Kaz, Tom Snow) 4:14
20. "Arthur's Theme (Best That You Can Do)" (Recorded live at Carnegie Hall, 1985) (Peter Allen, Burt Bacharach, Christopher Cross, Carole Bayer Sager) 4:45

== Charts ==
The Very Best of Peter Allen: The Boy from Down Under debuted on the Australian ARIA Charts at number 24, before peaking at number 16 the following week.

Chart (1992)	Peak position
Australian Albums (ARIA)	16
