= Captured Live at Carnegie Hall =

Live album by Peter Allen
- Released: 1985
- Recorded: 20–21 September 1984
- Venue: Carnegie Hall, New York City
- Label: Arista
- Producer: Dee Anthony

Peter Allen chronology
Not the Boy Next Door (1983)	Captured Live at Carnegie Hall (1985)	Making Every Moment Count (1990)

Professional ratings
Review scores
Source	Rating
AllMusic	4/5 stars

Captured Live at Carnegie Hall is the second live album by Australian singer-songwriter Peter Allen, released in 1985. The album was recorded at Carnegie Hall, New York City on 20 and 21 September 1984. It was recorded during Peter's sold-out engagement, which included a midnight concert due to popular demand.

== Critical reception ==
William Ruhlmann of AllMusic compared this set to Allen’s 1977 live album ‘’It Is Time for Peter Allen ’’ saying "Captured Live at Carnegie Hall had an ease and assurance that the previous [live] set, for all its excitement, lacked.".

== Track listing ==
- A1 "Not The Boy Next Door"
- A2 "Arthur's Theme (Best That You Can Do)"
- A3 "I Could Have Been a Sailor"
- A4 "You Haven't Heard the Last of Me"
- A5 "Fade to Black"
- B1 "Easy On the Weekend"
- B2 "Knockers"
- B3 "All I Wanted Was the Dream"
- B4 "Fly Away"
- B5 "I Go to Rio"
- C1 "Everything Old is New Again"
- C2 "Irving Berlin Medley"
- C3 "Only Wounded"
- C4 "Come Save Me" (duet with Nikki Gregoroff)
- C5 "Somebody's Angel" (duet with Dian Sorel)
- C6 "Harbour"
- D1 "Don't Cry Out Loud"
- D2 "Quiet Please, There's a Lady On Stage"
- D3 "Once Before I Go"
- D4 "As Time Goes By"
- D5 "I Honestly Love You"

== Personnel ==
- Dian Sorel, Nikki Gregoroff - backing vocals
- Mark Berger - bass
- Michael Braun - drums
- Larry Saltzman - guitar
- Michael Holmes - keyboards
- Miguel Fuentes - percussion
- Peter Allen - piano, vocals
- Louis Cortelezzi - woodwind, saxophone
