= Tenterfield Dreams =

Tenterfield Dreams: The Musical Journey of Peter Allen

Studio album by Colleen Hewett
- Released: June 1997
- Length: 46:42
- Label: MRA

Colleen Hewett chronology
Power of Love (1986)	Tenterfield Dreams: The Musical Journey of Peter Allen (1997)	Bulamama (2001)

Singles from Tenterfield Dreams: the musical journey of Peter Allen
- 1. "Street Angel" Released: 1997

Tenterfield Dreams: The Musical Journey of Peter Allen is the fifth studio album by Australian recording artist Colleen Hewett, released in June 1997. The album is a tribute album to Australian musician Peter Allen who died in 1992.

In an interview with The Age in August 1997, Hewett was asked if she knew Allen. She said "Look I'm not going to pretend he was my greatest friend. But we used to see each other, send each other flowers before concerts. I've always sung Peter Allen songs", adding "There seemed to be an awful lot of Peter's songs, so we thought we'd just do a tribute to him."

== Track listing ==
1. "Tenterfield Saddler" – 3:49
2. "Quiet Please (There's a Lady on Stage)" – 3:48
3. "Over the Rainbow" – 3:26
4. "The More I See You" – 4:25
5. "I Still Call Australia Home" – 3:13
6. "Arthur's Theme" – 4:17
7. "One Step Over the Borderline" – 3:48
8. "I Honestly Love You" – 3:27
9. "Fly Away" – 3:55
10. "Don't Cry Out Loud" – 3:48
11. "I'd Rather Leave While I'm in Love" – 3:59
12. "My Support" – 4:49

== Charts ==
Chart (1997)	Peak position
Australian Albums (ARIA Charts)	53
