= It Is Time for Peter Allen =

Live album by Peter Allen
- Released: 1977
- Recorded: 1977; The Bottom Line and Avery Fisher Hall, New York City and Roxy in Los Angeles
- Genres: Funk, soul, pop, disco
- Label: A&M
- Producers: Ed E. Thacker, Peter Allen

Peter Allen chronology
Taught by Experts (1976)	It Is Time for Peter Allen (1977)	I Could Have Been a Sailor (1979)

Professional ratings
Review scores
Source	Rating
AllMusic	4/5 stars

It Is Time for Peter Allen is the first live album by the Australian singer-songwriter Peter Allen, released in 1977. The album peaked at number 30 on the Australian Kent Music Report.

== Reception ==
Cash Box magazine said "This deluxe two-record set is one of the cleanest sounding live albums available by anyone and shows brilliantly the wit and performing flair of one of Australia's greatest exports since the boomerang. Allen's quivering vibrato and delicate tenor voice are perfectly suited to his sensitive lyrics and his piano style, which encompasses the power of Elton John and the grace of Randy Newman."

Joe Viglione of AllMusic retrospectively wrote, "This double vinyl live album from Peter Allen may be the best representation of the songwriter, covering many of the highlights of his career. Less sterile than his studio recordings, It Is Time for Peter Allen showcases the man's strengths." Viglione also complimented Allen's piano playing, adding that it "provides the real treat".

== Track listing ==
- A1 "Love Crazy" – 3:54
- A2 "She Loves to Hear the Music" – 3:34
- A3 "Everything Old Is New Again" – 3:18
- A4 "Interesting Changes" – 3:46
- A5 "I Honestly Love You" – 3:49
- B1 "Continental American" – 5:26
- B2 "The Natural Thing to Do" – 4:39
- B3 "The More I See You" – 2:55
- B4 "As Time Goes By" – 3:36
- B5 "Intermission / I Honestly Love You" – 0:54
- C1 "Don't Wish Too Hard" – 4:38
- C2 "Don't Cry Out Loud" – 3:42
- C3 "Tenterfield Saddler" – 4:07
- C4 "Puttin' Out Roots / The Sideshow's Leaving Town" – 6:36
- D1 "I Go to Rio" – 7:05
- D2 "Quiet Please, There's a Lady on the Stage" – 5:28
- D3 "Audience" – 3:14

While the album has yet to be formally issued on CD, it is available in its entirety and in original running order on CD 2 of the three-disc Singer - Songwriter: The Anthology box set issued by A&M in 1998.

== Charts ==
Chart (1977)	Peak position
Australian (Kent Music Report)	30
