= Isabel Keating =

American actress

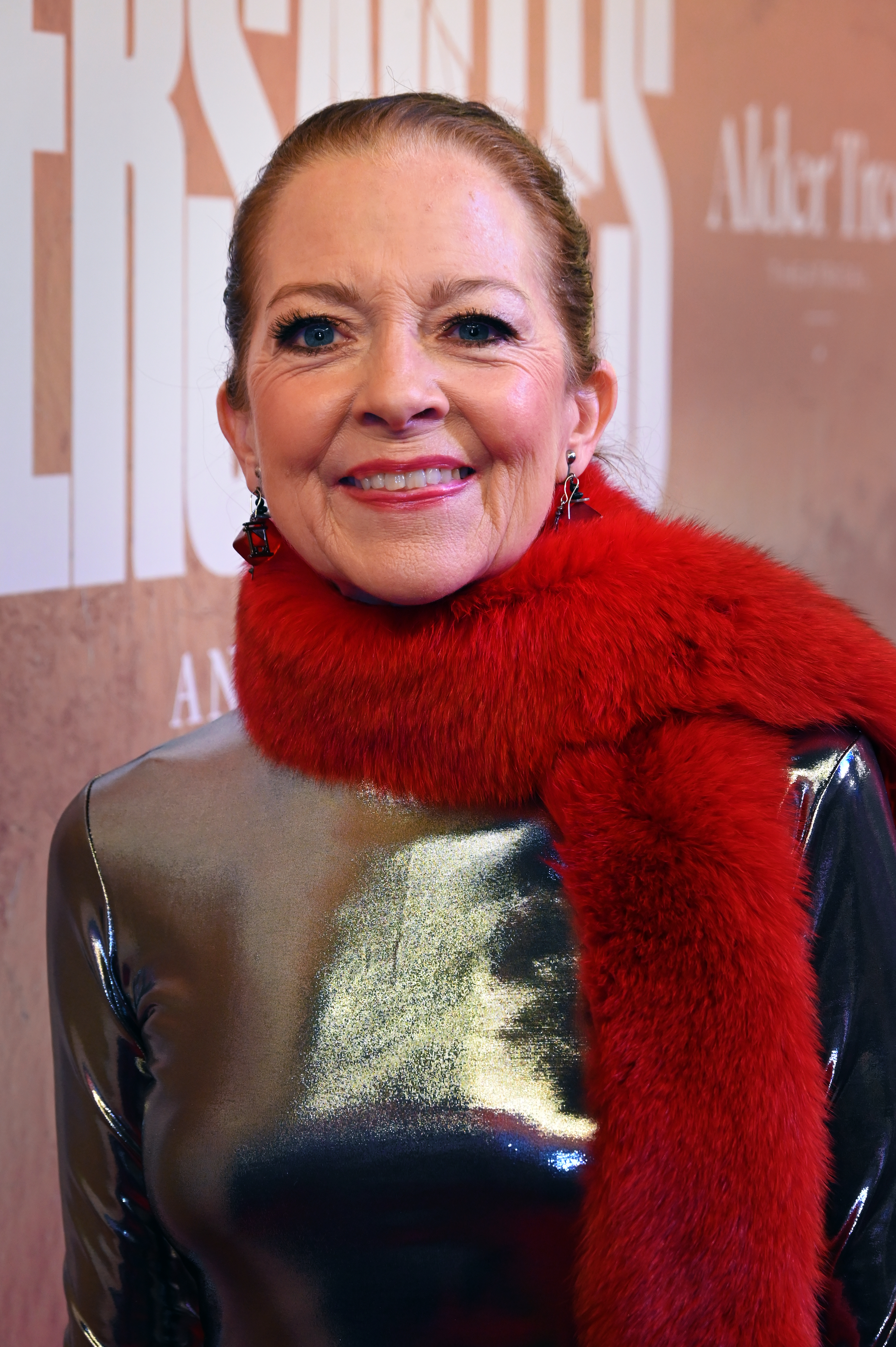
- Keating in 2025
- Born: May 1, 1961 (age 65); Savannah, Georgia, U.S.
- Years active: 1984–present
- Awards: Drama Desk Award, Theatre World Award, Helen Hayes Award
- Website: isabelkeating.com

Isabel Keating (born May 1, 1961) is an American actress and singer. She is known for her performance as Judy Garland in the original Broadway production of The Boy from Oz, which earned her a Tony Award nomination and a Drama Desk Award.

== Early life and career ==
Keating was born in Savannah, Georgia on May 1, 1961, to a Southern father and Moroccan mother. This background gave rise to an early knack for mimicking accents and, eventually, fluency in multiple languages. As she would tell AP's Lisa Tolin many years later, it was not until reaching her early twenties that Keating, who had long since assumed she would put those skills to use professionally as an interpreter, first "fell into" theater. Her first landing spot—or at least the first paying one—was with the Little Theatre of Savannah Mini-Rep Company, with whom Keating was performing children's theatre as early as the winter of 1983.

=== Broadway ===
Keating made her Broadway debut in 2003, in Enchanted April. She replaced Molly Ringwald in the role of Rose Arnott after having created the leading role of Lotty Wilton in the play's world-premiere production at Hartford Stage Company in Hartford, Connecticut.

Keating was widely acclaimed for her portrayal of Judy Garland in the 2003 Broadway production of The Boy From Oz, in which she starred opposite Hugh Jackman (who played Peter Allen). For her performance she received a Tony Award nomination and won a Drama Desk Award and Theatre World Award.

She joined the Broadway cast of Hairspray, directed by Jack O'Brien, in the role of Velma Von Tussle in June 2006 and stayed with the production through August 2007.

Keating played Peter Parker's Aunt May and other characters in the Broadway production of Spider-Man: Turn Off the Dark, directed by Julie Taymor.

From 2014 to 2015, Keating appeared on Broadway in Terrence McNally's hit comedy It's Only a Play, directed by Jack O'Brien.

She played Madame Morrible in Wicked on Broadway from January through November 2018 after performing the same role in the U.S. National Tour.

In 2024, she returned to Broadway in Doubt: A Parable as the understudy for Sister Aloysius, but later temporarily took over the role in early previews, replacing Tyne Daly, who departed the production after a medical emergency.

=== Other theatre ===
Keating has performed at Theatre Previews at Duke, where she starred in Gore Vidal's On the March to the Sea opposite Chris Noth, Charles Durning, Richard Easton, Michael Learned and Harris Yulin; at the Long Wharf Theater in New Haven, Connecticut, in Tom Stoppard's Travesties opposite Sam Waterston; and at the Paper Mill Playhouse, in Millburn, New Jersey, in Wendy Kesselman's stage version of The Diary of Anne Frank.

She won the 2000 Helen Hayes Award for Best Actress for her performance in Tom Stoppard's play Indian Ink at the Studio Theatre in Washington, D.C.

Keating appeared as Vi in Lucinda Coxon's Waiting at the Water's Edge in its American premiere, directed by Nela Wagman for the Watermark Theatre Company, and played the Duchess of Berwick in the Oscar Wilde comedy Lady Windermere's Fan directed by Moisés Kaufman in 2005 at the Williamstown Theatre Festival in Williamstown, Massachusetts.

=== Film and television ===
Keating co-starred in Indignation—James Schamus's feature film directorial début, based on Philip Roth's novel—opposite Logan Lerman and Sarah Gadon. The film premiered at the Sundance Film Festival in January 2016 and was theatrically released on July 29, 2016.

She has guest-starred in episodes of 3 lbs (2006), Law & Order: Criminal Intent (2008), The Path (2016), and New Amsterdam (2021) and appeared in films including The Nanny Diaries and The Life Before Her Eyes.

== Acting credits ==
=== Theatre ===
Year	Show	Role	Venue
1984	La Ronde	Sweet Young Thing	The Studio Theatre (Washington, D.C.)
1986	The Miss Firecracker Contest	Popeye	Bristol Valley Playhouse (Naples, NY)
1986–1987	The Slab Boys Trilogy	Lucille	The Studio Theatre (Washington, D.C.)
1989	The Bright and Bold Design		The Studio Theatre (Washington, D.C.)
1990	In Perpetuity Throughout the Universe	Christine	The Studio Theatre (Washington, D.C.)
1994	Waiting at the Water's Edge	Vi	Off-Broadway: The Ohio Theatre
1994	Written and Sealed	Nancy	Off-Broadway: Puerto Rican Traveling Theater
1994	The Rise and Fall of Little Voice	Little Voice	The Studio Theatre (Washington, D.C.)
1995	Slavs!	Katarina	The Studio Theatre (Washington, D.C.)
1995	Three Sisters	Irina	The Studio Theatre (Washington, D.C.)
1995	Chilean Holiday	Digna	Actors Theatre of Louisville (Louisville, KY)
1997	One Foot on the Floor	LaVita Terrafamilia	Denver Center for the Performing Arts (Denver, CO)
1998	Once in a Lifetime	Florabel Leigh	Off-Broadway: Atlantic Theater Company
1999	Indian Ink	Flora Crewe	The Studio Theatre (Washington, D.C.)
2000	Enchanted April	Lottie Wilton	Hartford Stage (Hartford, CT)
2001	Dinner with Friends	Beth	Old Globe Theatre (San Diego, CA)
2003	Enchanted April	Rose Arnott (replacement)	Broadway: Belasco Theatre
2003–2004	The Boy from Oz	Judy Garland	Broadway: Imperial Theatre
2005	Travesties	Nadya	Long Wharf Theatre (New Haven, CT)
2005	On the March to the Sea	Minna Hinks	Theatre Previews at Duke (Raleigh, NC)
2005	Lady Windermere's Fan	Duchess of Berwick	Williamstown Theatre Festival (Williamstown, MA)
2006	The Diary of Anne Frank	Edith Frank	Paper Mill Playhouse (Millburn, NJ)
2006–2007	Hairspray	Velma Von Tussle (replacement)	Broadway: Neil Simon Theatre
2009	A Lifetime Burning	Lydia Freemantle	Off-Broadway: Primary Stages
2010–2014	Spider-Man: Turn Off the Dark	Aunt May/Mrs. Gribrock/Maxie	Broadway: Foxwoods Theatre
2014	Travesties	Nadya	Bay Street Theater (Sag Harbor, NY)
2014–2015	It's Only a Play	Virginia Noyes/Julia Budder (standby)	Broadway: Gerald Schoenfeld Theatre, Bernard B. Jacobs Theatre
2016–2017	Wicked	Madame Morrible	U.S. National Tour
2018	Wicked	Madame Morrible	Broadway: Gershwin Theatre
2019	Because of Winn Dixie	Franny Block	Goodspeed Opera House (East Haddam, CT)
2024	Doubt: A Parable	Sister Aloysius (u/s)	Broadway: Todd Haimes Theatre
2024	The Queen of Versailles	Debbie Mallery	Emerson Colonial Theatre
2025	Theatre People	Charlotte Sanders	Westport Country Playhouse (Westport, CT)
2025	The Queen of Versailles	Debbie Mallery	Broadway: St. James Theatre

=== Film and television ===
Year	Title	Role	Notes
1999	Dead Broke	Forensics Specialist	
1999	Magnetism		Short film
2004	58th Tony Awards	Herself	TV special
2004	American Masters	Judy Garland	Episode: "Judy Garland: By Myself"
2006	3 lbs	Rosemary Donovan	Episode: "Bad Boys"
2007	The Nanny Diaries	Paranoid Mom	
2007	The Life Before Her Eyes	Maureen's Mother	
2008	Law & Order: Criminal Intent	Janine	Episode: "Please Note We Are No Longer Accepting Letters of Recommendation from Henry Kissinger"
2016	The Path	Jeanette Kemp	Episode: "Breaking and Entering"
2016	Indignation	Miss Clement	
2021	New Amsterdam	Mary Wheeler	Episode: "More Joy"

== Awards and nominations ==
Year	Award	Category	Work	Result
2000	Helen Hayes Award	Outstanding Lead Actress in a Resident Play	Indian Ink	Won
2004	Audie Award	Outstanding Achievement in Fiction Narration	Hissy Fit by Mary Kay Andrews	Finalist
2004	Outer Critics Circle Award	Outstanding Featured Actress in a Musical	The Boy from Oz	Nominated
2004	Theatre World Award	Outstanding Debut Performance in a Broadway Production	The Boy from Oz	Won
2004	Drama League Award	Distinguished Performance	The Boy from Oz	Nominated
2004	Drama Desk Award	Outstanding Featured Actress in a Musical	The Boy from Oz	Won
2004	Tony Award	Best Featured Actress in a Musical	The Boy from Oz	Nominated
