= Back with a Heart =

Studio album by Olivia Newton-John
- Released: 12 May 1998
- Recorded: October 1997 – February 1998
- Studios: Ocean Way Nashville, Soundshop Recording Studios, Masterfonics, Emerald Sound, Sound Stage Studios and Sony/ATV Music Publishing Studio (Nashville, Tennessee); Chartmaker Studios and Moonee Pond Studios (Malibu, California); Ultrasound Studios (Los Angeles, California)
- Genre: Country
- Length: 42:38
- Label: Festival
- Producers: Tony Brown; Gary Burr; Don Cook; John Farrar; Chris Farren; David Foster

Olivia Newton-John chronology
Gaia: One Woman's Journey (1994)	Back with a Heart (1998)	Highlights from The Main Event (1998)

Singles from Back with a Heart
- 1. "I Honestly Love You '98" Released: May 1998; 2. "Precious Love" Released: June 1998; 3. "Back with a Heart" Released: October 1998

Back with a Heart is the seventeenth studio album by British-Australian singer Olivia Newton-John. It was released by MCA Nashville on 12 May 1998 in the United States. Her first album in four years, it marked her return to country music after two decades. The album peaked in the Top Ten Country charts in both the U.S. and U.K. In America, it was her first album to crack the Billboard Top Country Albums charts since Totally Hot in 1978.

== Production and release ==
Back with a Heart was recorded in Nashville and marked Newton-John's return to the US Country chart after an absence of almost twenty years. "When I decided I wanted to record again, the kind of music I was listening to was country, and I thought I wanted to go back to my roots. It seems like all the good melodies and the good songs are on country radio," Newton-John said in an interview with Billboard. "I started going to Nashville and meeting people, and I really liked [MCA Nashville president] Tony Brown," she says. "I met everybody, and everyone was wonderful, but also I'd been with MCA a long time, and they have my catalog. So it makes sense for me to be there."

== Singles ==
Back with a Heart was preceded by the single "I Honestly Love You", a re-recording of Newton-John's 1974 number-one hit. MCA Nashville initially intended to release "Precious Love" as the album's lead single to country radio but eventually settled on the updated version of "I Honestly Love You". Selected by Newton-John, David Foster agreed to produce the remake, who in turn asked Babyface to contribute backing vocals to the song. "I Honestly Love You" was released in two versions; the album version for pop and adult contemporary radio, and a remix for country radio. "Precious Love" was eventually released as the album's second single, while title track "Back with a Heart" was issued as a vinyl 45 RPM single in the United States. Album cut "Love Is a Gift" won a 1999 Daytime Emmy Award for Outstanding Original Song after appearing on the American television soap opera As the World Turns.

== Critical reception ==
Professional ratings
Review scores
Source	Rating
AllMusic	3/5 stars

AllMusic editor Stephen Thomas Erlewine rated the album three stars out of five and found that Newton-John "put a great deal of effort into the making of Back with a Heart – the record is her best in years. It's much slicker than even her polished country-pop from the '70s, but a team of producers [...] have created an appealingly smooth sound that gives her a platform to showcase her mature craftsmanship. None of the songs immediately stand out, but the album has a consistent quality that is thoroughly winning."

In their review of "I Honestly Love You", Billboard noted that "rerecording a classic is risky business, especially when the artist doing the cover is the original hitmaker. However, in re-cutting 'I Honestly Love You' for her new album, Back With A Heart, Newton-John tackles the challenge head-on and wins. As charming as the original was, on this new version, 49 year old Newton-John sounds like a woman who has experienced life and fully conveys the depth of emotion in the lyric. Her vocal performance com-bines passion and vulnerability in a heady emotional cocktail."

== Track listing ==
Back with a Heart track listing
No.	Title	Writer(s)	Producer(s)	Length
1.	"Precious Love"	Olivia Newton-John; Anne Roboff	Don Cook	3:24
2.	"Closer to Me"	John Farrar	Farrar	4:17
3.	"Fight for Our Love"	Newton-John; Victoria Shaw	Cook	3:51
4.	"Spinning His Wheels"	Newton-John; Gary Burr	Gary Burr	3:30
5.	"Under My Skin"	Farrar	Farrar	3:32
6.	"Love Is a Gift"	Newton-John; Shaw; Earl Rose	Tony Brown	4:18
7.	"I Don't Wanna Say Goodnight"	Al Anderson; Robert Ellis Orrall	Cook	3:59
8.	"Don't Say That"	Newton-John; Chris Farren	Farren	4:45
9.	"Attention"	Newton-John; Roboff; Steve Seskin	Brown	3:33
10.	"Back with a Heart"	Newton-John; Burr	Burr	2:59
11.	"I Honestly Love You"	Peter Allen; Jeff Barry	David Foster	4:04

Japanese bonus track
No.	Title	Writer(s)	Producer(s)	Length
12.	"What's Forever For"	Rafe van Hoy	Farren	4:07

== Personnel ==
Performers and musicians

- Olivia Newton-John – lead vocals, backing vocals (6, 8–10)
- Steve Nathan – keyboards (1–3, 5–7, 9), Hammond B3 organ (3)
- Dennis Burnside – acoustic piano (1, 3, 7)
- Sean Callery – Synclavier (2)
- Barry Walsh – synthesizers (4), acoustic piano (10)
- John Hobbs – acoustic piano (8)
- David Foster – keyboards (11), arrangements (11)
- Felipe Elgueta – synthesizer programming (11)
- Mark Casstevens – acoustic guitar (1, 3, 7)
- Brent Mason – electric guitar (1, 3, 7), electric lead guitar (10)
- Larry Byrom – electric guitar (2, 5, 6, 9)
- John Farrar – electric guitar (2, 5), backing vocals (5)
- Steve Gibson – acoustic guitar (2, 9), electric guitar (5, 6)
- Gary Burr – acoustic guitar (4), backing vocals (4)
- B. James Lowry – acoustic guitar (4, 10)
- Dan Dugmore – electric guitar (6), steel guitar (9)
- Chris Farren – acoustic guitar (8), mandolin (8), backing vocals (8)
- Darrell Scott – acoustic guitar (8)
- Brent Rowan – electric guitar (8)
- Cary Park – electric guitar solo (8)
- Chris Leuzinger – electric guitar (10)
- Dean Parks – guitars (11)
- Michael Thompson – guitars (11)
- Bruce Bouton – pedal steel guitar (1, 3, 7), lap steel guitar (4), slide guitar (10)
- Paul Franklin – steel guitar (2, 5, 8)
- Michael Rhodes – bass (1–3, 5–7, 9)
- Duncan Mullins – bass (4, 10)
- Joe Chemay – bass (8)
- Eddie Bayers – drums (1–3, 5, 7, 10)
- Paul Leim – drums (6, 8, 9), percussion (9)
- Terry McMillan – percussion (4, 10)
- Mark Leggett – percussion (8), programming (8)
- Rob Hajacos – fiddle (4, 10)
- Larry Franklin – fiddle (8)
- Ronn Huff – string arrangements and conductor (8)
- The Nashville String Machine – strings (8)
- Wes Hightower – backing vocals (1, 3, 7)
- Liana Manis – backing vocals (1, 3, 7)
- Dennis Wilson – backing vocals (1, 3, 7)
- Christina Nichols – backing vocals (2)
- Tabitha Fair – backing vocals (6, 9)
- Kim Fleming – backing vocals (6, 9)
- Chris Rodriguez – backing vocals (6, 9)
- Babyface – backing vocals (11)

Production

- Rory S. Kaplan – executive producer
- Bill Neighbors – executive producer
- Scott Johnson – production assistant (1, 3, 7)
- Patty Nichols – project coordinator (2, 5)
- Jessie Noble – project coordinator (2, 5, 6, 9)
- Bill Nemuth – project coordinator (4, 10)
- Kelly Giedt – project coordinator (8)
- Felipe Elgueta – project coordinator (11)
- Gabrielle Raumberger – art direction
- Joseph Kiely – design
- Michelle Day – photography
- Caroline Greyshock – photography
- Patrick McDermott – photography
- Mini DeBlasio – stylist

Technical

- Mike Bradley – recording (1, 3, 7), additional recording (1, 3, 7)
- Chuck Ainlay – mixing (1–3, 5–11), recording (2, 5, 6, 9)
- Greg Kane – recording (4, 10)
- Steve Marcantonio – recording (8)
- Felipe Elgueta – recording (11)
- Mark Capps – recording assistant (1, 3, 7), additional recording (1, 3, 7)
- Tim Roberts – recording assistant (1, 3, 7), additional recording (1, 3, 7)
- Aaron Swihart – recording assistant (1–3, 5–7, 9)
- Mark Ralston – mix assistant (1–3, 5–11), recording assistant (2, 5, 6, 9)
- King Williams – recording assistant (4, 10)
- Chris Davie – recording assistant (8)
- John Saylor – recording assistant (8), additional recording (8), technical support
- Pat McMakin – additional recording (1, 3, 7)
- Al Grassmick – additional recording (4, 10), overdub tracking (6, 9)
- Shawn Allan – additional recording (8)
- Tom Harding – additional recording (8)
- Alejandro Rodriguez – additional recording (8)
- Dan Shike – additional recording (10)
- Steve MacMillan – overdub tracking (2, 5)
- Steve Marcantonio – overdub tracking (6, 9), additional recording (8)
- Tony Green – additional overdub recording (6, 9)
- Russ Martin – additional overdub recording (6, 9)
- Don Cobb – editing
- Jeff Levinson – encoding
- Ric Wilson – encoding
- H.G. Hollans – technical support
- Denny Purcell – mastering at Georgetown Masters (Nashville, Tennessee)
- Jonathan Russell – mastering assistant

== Charts ==
=== Weekly charts ===
Chart (1998)	Peak position
Australian Albums (ARIA)	66
Canada Country Albums/CDs (RPM)	14
US Billboard 200	59
UK Country Albums (Official Charts)	3
US Top Country Albums (Billboard)	9

=== Year-end charts ===
Chart (1998)	Position
US Top Country Albums (Billboard)	73

== Release history ==
Release history and formats for Back with a Heart
Region	Date	Format	Label	Ref(s)
United States	12 May 1998	CD; cassette	MCA Nashville	
Japan	21 May 1998	CD; cassette	MCA Nashville	
