= Peter Allen: Not the Boy Next Door =

2015 Australian TV series

- DVD cover
- Genre: Biographical drama
- Written by: Stephen MacLean; Michael Miller; Justin Monjo
- Directed by: Shawn Seet
- Starring: Joel Jackson; Sara West; Rebecca Gibney; Sigrid Thornton
- Country of origin: Australia
- Original language: English
- No. of episodes: 2

Production
- Producer: Kerrie Mainwaring
- Cinematography: Bruce Young
- Editor: Deborah Peart
- Running time: 120 minutes
- Production company: Beyond International Group

Original release
- Network: Seven Network
- Release: 13 September – 20 September 2015

Peter Allen: Not the Boy Next Door is a two-part Australian miniseries about music legend Peter Allen that screened on the Seven Network in 2015.

== Plot synopsis ==
Peter Allen: Not the Boy Next Door tells the story of how Peter Allen rose from New South Wales to the Hollywood Hills and ends up becoming part of American royalty along the way.

== Cast ==
- Joel Jackson as Peter Allen
- Ky Baldwin as Young Peter Allen (Peter Woolnough)
- Sara West as Liza Minnelli
- Rebecca Gibney as Marion Woolnough (Allen's mother)
- Sigrid Thornton as Judy Garland
- Henri Szeps as Dee Anthony
- Nick Farnell as Dick Woolnough
- Andrew Lees as Gregory Connell
- Rob Mills as Chris Bell
- Elise McCann as Lynne Woolnough (Allen's sister)
- Christie Whelan Browne as Olivia Newton-John
- Joanne Samuel as Bev Moulson

== Production ==
Filming of the miniseries took place in early 2015. It is written by Stephen MacLean, Michael Miller and Justin Monjo, and directed by Shawn Seet.

== Awards ==
Award	Category	Subject	Result
AACTA Awards (5th)	Best Telefeature, Mini Series or Short Run Series	Kerrie Mainwaring	Won
AACTA Awards (5th)	Best Direction in Television	Shawn Seet	Won
AACTA Awards (5th)	Best Lead Actor in a Television Drama	Joel Jackson	Won
AACTA Awards (5th)	Best Guest or Supporting Actor in a Television Drama	Ky Baldwin	Won
AACTA Awards (5th)	Best Guest or Supporting Actress in a Television Drama	Sigrid Thornton	Won
AACTA Awards (5th)	Best Screenplay in Television	Michael Miller	Nominated
AACTA Awards (5th)	Best Editing in Television	Deborah Peart	Nominated
AACTA Awards (5th)	Best Sound in Television	Grant Shepherd	Nominated
AACTA Awards (5th)	Best Sound in Television	Ashley Irwin	Nominated
AACTA Awards (5th)	Best Sound in Television	Ian Neilson	Nominated
AACTA Awards (5th)	Best Sound in Television	Ben Anderson	Nominated
AACTA Awards (5th)	Best Sound in Television	Nigel Croydon	Nominated
AACTA Awards (5th)	Best Sound in Television	Robert Sullivan	Nominated
AACTA Awards (5th)	Best Production Design in Television	Tim Ferrier	Nominated
AACTA Awards (5th)	Best Costume Design in Television	Jenny Miles	Won

== Ratings ==
Episode		Original airdate	Timeslot	Viewers (in millions)	Rank (Night)	Consolidated Viewers (in millions)	Rank (Adjusted)	Source
1	"Part One"	13 September 2015	Sunday 8:30-10:30 pm	1.333	#3	1.560	#2	
2	"Part Two"	20 September 2015	Sunday 8:30-10:30 pm	1.212	#3	1.450	#1	

== Chart impact ==
Following the screening of episode one, Allen's 2006 album "The Ultimate Peter Allen" re-entered the ARIA Albums Chart at number 24, thus surpassing its 2006 peak of 50. Likewise, the song "I Still Call Australia Home" re-entered the ARIA singles chart at number 60, surpassing its previous peak of 72 achieved in June 1982.

Following the screening of episode 2, "The Ultimate Peter Allen" rose to another new peak of 18, whilst the song "Tenterfield Saddler" made its ARIA singles chart debut at number 53.
