= George Woolnough =

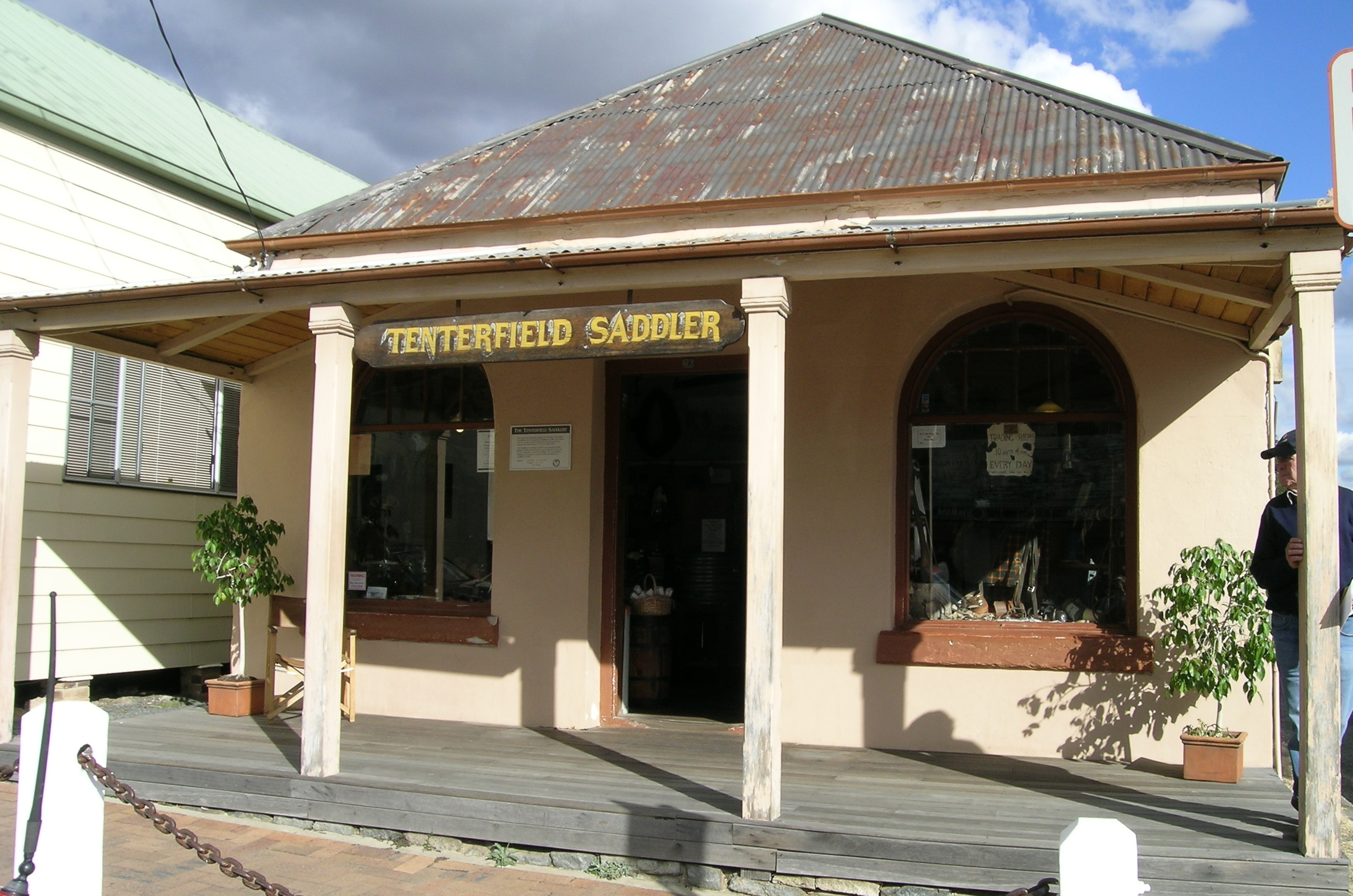
The Tenterfield Saddlery where Woolnough worked

George Harewell Woolnough (10 February 1884 – 13 December 1963) was a saddler in Tenterfield, New South Wales, from 1908 until his retirement in 1960.

Woolnough's grandson was Peter Allen, a flamboyant cabaret singer who immortalised Woolnough with the country song "Tenterfield Saddler". Woolnough's son, Dick Woolnough, became a violent alcoholic upon returning from World War II, eventually shooting and killing himself. Woolnough never understood, nor got over this devastating event.

Built in 1860 of quarried blue granite, the Tenterfield Saddlery at which Woolnough worked is National Trust of Australia listed.

On 26 November 2005 an extension of the Tenterfield library was opened and named the "George Woolnough Wing".

The Woolnough family owned terrier dogs, like those bred by many people in the district. On account of George's subsequent fame immortalised in song, along with the already preeminent fame of the town, and the known concentration of breeders in the area, this distinctly Australian breed was named the Tenterfield Terrier in 1993.
