= Making Every Moment Count =

Studio album by Peter Allen
- Released: 5 February 1990
- Recorded: 1988–89
- Genre: Pop
- Length: 38:27
- Label: RCA Victor
- Producer: Irwin Fisch; Larry Saltzman; Marc Shaiman; Michael Jay; Seth Swirsky

Peter Allen chronology
| Captured Live at Carnegie Hall (1985) | Making Every Moment Count (1990) | The Very Best of Peter Allen: The Boy from Down Under (1992) |

Professional ratings
Review scores
| Source | Rating |
|---|---|
| AllMusic | 3/5 stars |

Making Every Moment Count is the eighth and final studio album by Australian singer-songwriter Peter Allen, released in 1990, two years before his death from an AIDS-related illness. It was his first album of entirely new material since 1983's Not the Boy Next Door.

== Reviews ==
William Ruhlmann from AllMusic gave the album 3 out of 5, saying; "There may [be] nods to his past, but otherwise Allen was very up to date on Making Every Moment Count, employing five different producers to come up with a recording that had a timely sound, complete with icy synthesizer riffs and programmed drums coming on like torpedoes.” He added, “he remained most affecting on the ballads, which had a poignancy that would be accentuated by Allen's death from AIDS in 1992.”

== Track listing ==
1. "Tonight You Made My Day" (Peter Allen, Seth Swirsky) - 4:12
2. "Making Every Moment Count" (with Melissa Manchester) (Peter Allen, Seth Swirsky) - 3:58
3. "When I Get My Name in Lights"(with Harry Connick Jr.) (Peter Allen) - 3:03
4. "Nobody Can Break Us Up" (Michael Jay, Peter Allen) - 4:21
5. "I Could Marry the Rain" (Peter Allen) - 3:08
6. "See You in the Springtime" (Dean Pitchford, Peter Allen) - 4:08
7. "So Much Depends On Love Today" (Peter Allen) - 4:41
8. "Why Not?" (Dean Pitchford, Peter Allen) - 3:34
9. "I Couldn't Have Done It Without You" (Peter Allen, Seth Swirsky) - 3:46
10. "Love Don't Need a Reason" (Marsha Malamet, Michael Callen, Peter Allen) - 3:36
