= The Allen Brothers (Australia) =

Australian cabaret act

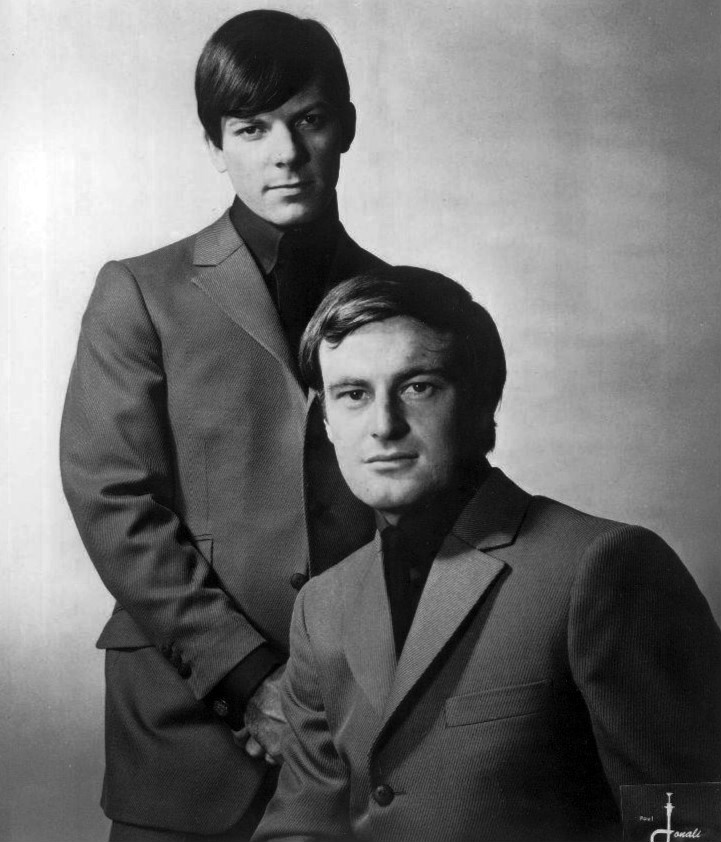
Peter Allen and Chris Bell as the Allen Brothers, 1967.

The Allen Brothers were an Australian cabaret act of Peter Allen and singer and guitarist Chris Bell. Allen was then Peter Woolnough, when at the age of fifteen he met Chris Bell, part of a singing duo, The Two Shades. When the other member of The Two Shades departed it was Bell's father who picked the name Allen Brothers for Chris and Peter. They also sang with the Barry Sisters, an Australian group unrelated to the American Barry Sisters. The duo broke up at the same time as Allen's marriage to Liza Minnelli and Chris Bell went to America and formed a touring band called Boomerang in the 70's .

== Musical Duo ==
=== Formation (1959-1960) ===
Upon their formation in 1959, Chris Bell and Peter Allen began performing folk-pop as the Allen Brothers in nightclubs in Surfers Paradise and the wider Gold Coast region. It was in the same year that they made their professional debut as a musical duo with a paid performance at the Grand Hotel in Coolangatta. The duo also performed on show Teen Time in 1959 which marked their first ever television performance. The duo relocated from the Gold Coast to Sydney in 1960 in search of more opportunities. It was in Sydney that they were scouted by Brian Henderson, who was the host of Bandstand, an Australian pop television show. Henderson made the Allen Brothers a regular act on the show, gaining them national popularity and providing networking opportunities such as their future close working relationship with Olivia Newton-John.

=== Musical Releases (1960) ===
The first official song released by The Allen Brothers was in 1960 and was titled ‘First Kiss.’ This release was recognised by musical producer Johnny O’Keefe, who signed the duo on a contract with label Leedon. With this label, The Allen Brothers released four singles: ‘Bells Bells Bells’ / ‘Summer Clouds’ / ‘There’s No Need’ / ‘Busy Lips.’ After their contract with Leeds, the duo moved to Australian label Pye and recorded another four singles: ‘Pretty Keen Teen’ / ‘My Secret’ / ‘Too Much’ / ‘Ever Since’ and a collaboration with The Barry Sisters on the single ‘Knocking on the Right Front Door.’ The only single that had a chart entry in Australia was ‘First Kiss’ which entered Melbourne at number 32.

=== Musical Releases (1961-1962) ===
In 1961, The Allen Brothers switched labels again and signed a contract with HMV. In December 1961, they released the singles ‘No Fooling’ and ‘Be An Angel Darling.’ Two months later, they released the singles ‘Baby Loves Me’ and ‘Firefly.’ Lastly, they released ‘There’s Never Been a Girl Like You’ and ‘Ain’t Misbehaving’ in August 1962.

=== Performances and relocation (1962-1969) ===
During this period, The Allen Brothers had notable performances such as a role in an Alice In Wonderland production at the Phillip Theatre. Moreover, the duo played a regular support role for the American performer Frances Faye at a Sydney nightclub called Chequers. They gained enough popularity to book a three-week nightclub tour act in Tokyo. The performance was received so well that the tour was extended, and the Allen Brothers remained on tour in south-east Asia for two years. During their performance at the Hilton in Hong Kong, The Allen Brothers were spotted by international superstar Judy Garland who subsequently became their permanent manager and allowed them to open for her in her London concerts.

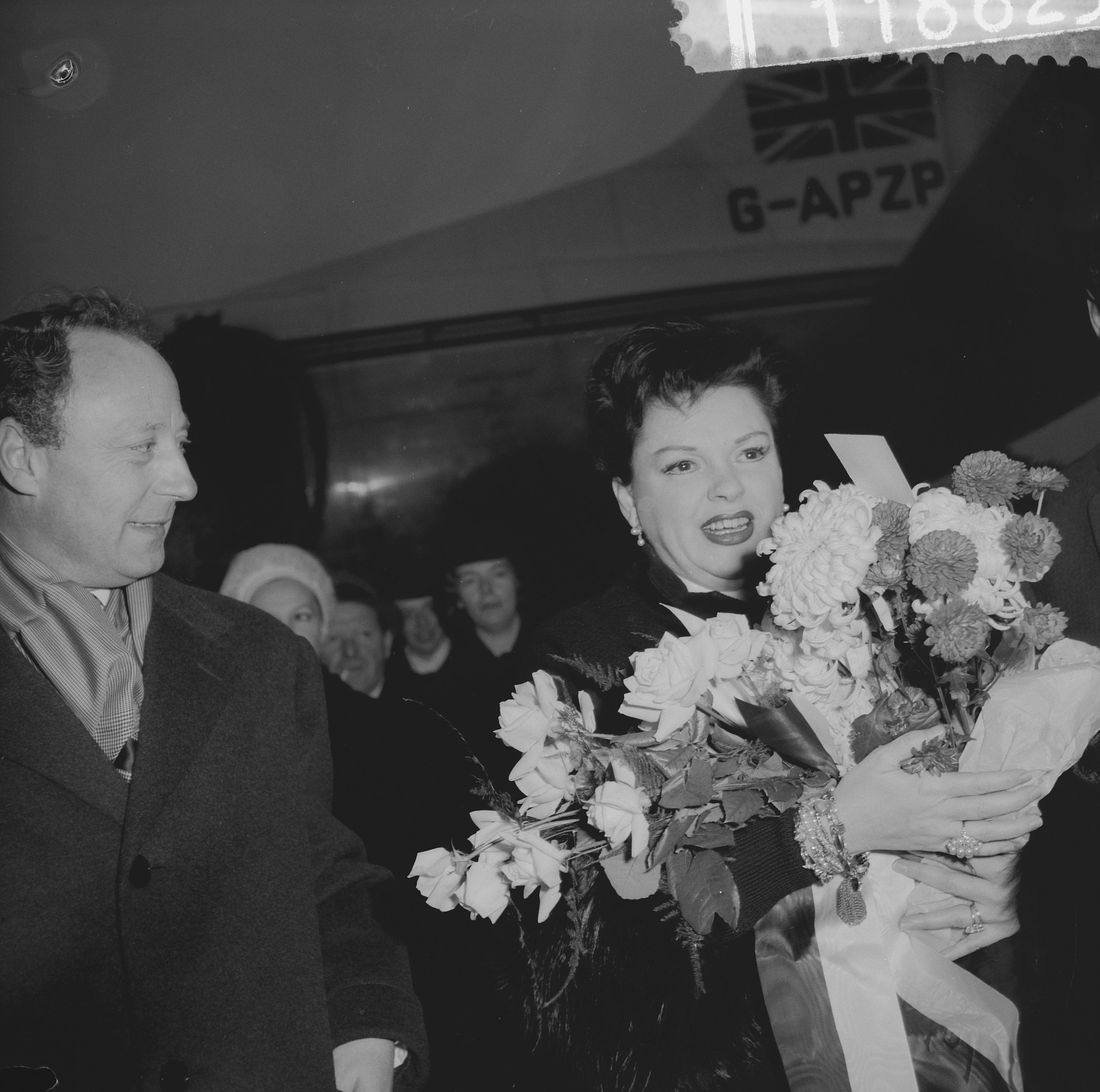
Judy Garland, 1960.

The connection with Garland provided The Allen Brothers with an opening into the American music industry. In the 1960s, the duo moved to New York City and supported Garland in performances across America and Canada. Throughout the decade, they performed across famous clubs, made television appearances and recorded an album. Peter Allen met Garland's daughter Liza Minnelli. They married on March 3, 1967, but were separated by the end of 1969.

== Solo careers ==
The Allen Brothers ultimately split in early 1970 due to Peter's desire to branch out musically in to the Broadway scene. Whereas Chris Bell went on to form a band called ‘Boomerang’ featuring Tracy Fordice, Daniel Ryman, James, Spalding and Don Dessmeyer which toured for over a year, focusing on returning to the Los Angeles music industry. Playing six nights a week the pressure on the lead singer (Chris's partner) turned out to be too much and she left the band just before they were to audition in Los Angeles. The band split and Chris Bell (Allen) went on to pursue his passion of being a pilot and instructor and quit the music industry. Peter Allen went on to have an extensive solo career.

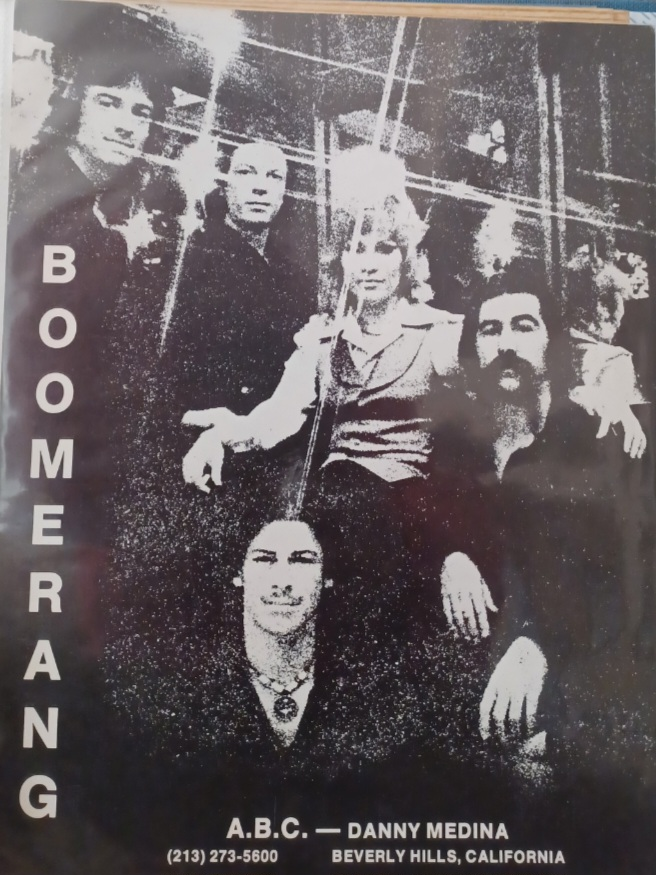
Music

== Singles ==
Year	Single	Record Label	Album
1960	Pretty Keen Teen	Pye Records	N/A
1960	Bells, Bells, Bells	Lee Gordon	N/A
1960	There's No Need / Busy Lips		N/A
1960	First Kiss	Pye Records	N/A
1960	No Hesitation (Ft. Barry Sisters)	Pye Records	N/A
1960	Ever Since	Pye Records	N/A
1962	Baby Loves Me	His Master's Voice	N/A
1966	Two by Two / Still The Rain Comes Down	ABC Records	N/A
1966	I Owe Everything To You	ABC-Paramount	N/A
1966	The Wrong Woman	ABC-Paramount	N/A
1968	Ten Below	Mercury	Album #1
1968	My Silent Symphony	Mercury	Album #1
1968	Next Plane to London	Mercury	Album #1
1968	Picture Me	Mercury	Album #1
1968	Medley #2: Wizard of Oz (We’re Off To See The Wizard) / Puff, The Magic Dragon	Mercury	Album #1
1968	A Man And A Woman	Mercury	Album #1
1968	Medley #1: Come Rain or Come Shine / Rain, The Park And Other Things	Mercury	Album #1
1968	Just Friends	Mercury	Album #1
1968	Waltzing Matilda	Mercury	Album #1
1968	A Baby's Coming	Mercury	Album #1
Unknown	No Foolin’	His Master's Voice	N/A
