= Taught by Experts =

Studio album by Peter Allen
- Released: 10 December 1976
- Recorded: 1976
- Studio: The Record Plant and Village Recorders, Los Angeles
- Genre: Funk, disco, pop
- Label: A&M
- Producer: Brooks Arthur

Peter Allen chronology
Continental American (1974)	Taught by Experts (1976)	It Is Time for Peter Allen (1977)

Taught by Experts is the fourth studio album by Peter Allen, released in 1976. It spawned the hit "I Go to Rio". The album featured such musicians as Thom Rotella, Jerome Richardson, Lesley Gore and Dusty Springfield.

== Track listing ==
1. "Puttin' Out Roots" (Peter Allen) – 3:32
2. "She Loves to Hear the Music" (Allen, Carole Bayer Sager) – 3:16
3. "Back Doors Crying" (Allen, Sager) – 4:46
4. "I Go to Rio" (Allen, Adrienne Anderson) – 3:17
5. "Planes" (Allen, Sager) – 3:05
6. "Quiet Please, There's a Lady on Stage" (Allen, Sager) – 5:08
7. "This Time Around" (Allen) – 3:15
8. "The More I See You" (Mack Gordon, Harry Warren) – 3:30
9. "Harbour" (Allen) – 3:36
10. "(I've Been) Taught by Experts" (Allen, Hal Hackady) – 3:12
11. "Six-Thirty Sunday Morning/New York, I Don't Know About You" (Allen) – 5:01

== Personnel ==
- Peter Allen - vocals, piano, electric piano
- Thom Rotella - acoustic guitar
- John Jarvis - organ
- Alan Estes - percussion
- Judy Elliot - backing vocals
- Chuck Domanico - bass, acoustic bass
- Jim Gordon - drums
- Jim Keltner - drums
- Marilyn Baker - violin
- Jerome Richardson - saxophone
- Herb Alpert - trumpet solo on "The More I See You"
- Lesley Gore - backing vocals
- Dusty Springfield - backing vocals
- Brenda Russell - backing vocals

== Charts ==
Chart (1976–1977)	Peak position
Australian (Kent Music Report)	11

== Certifications ==
Region	Certification	Certified units/sales
Australia (ARIA)	Gold	20,000^{^}
^{^} Shipments figures based on certification alone.
