= Fly Away (David Foster song) =

1980 song

Song by Mariya Takeuchi

from the album Love Songs
- Released: 1980
- Recorded: 1979
- Genre: Pop
- Length: 3:17
- Label: RCA Records
- Songwriter(s): David Foster; Carole Bayer Sager
- Producer(s): Kenichi Makimura; Shigeki Miyata

"Fly Away" is a song written by David Foster and Carole Bayer Sager. It was originally recorded by Mariya Takeuchi for her 1980 album Love Songs.

== Peter Allen version ==
"Fly Away"

Single by Peter Allen

from the album Bi-Coastal
- B-side: "Simon"
- Released: 1980
- Recorded: 1979
- Studio: Sunset Sound
- Genre: Soft rock
- Length: 4:05
- Label: A&M Records
- Songwriter(s): David Foster; Carole Bayer Sager
- Producer(s): David Foster

Peter Allen covered the song for his 1980 album Bi-Coastal.

The song is Allen's only Billboard Hot 100 entry, peaking at No. 55.

=== Chart performance ===
Chart (1980)	Peak position
US Billboard Hot 100	55
US Billboard Adult Contemporary	45

== Stevie Woods version ==
"Fly Away"

Single by Stevie Woods

from the album Take Me to Your Heaven
- B-side: "Simon"
- Released: 1982
- Recorded: 1981
- Studio: Rusk Sound Studios
- Genre: Soul, R&B
- Length: 4:04
- Label: Cotillion Records
- Songwriter(s): David Foster; Carole Bayer Sager
- Producer(s): Jack White

Stevie Woods covered the song for his 1981 album Take Me to Your Heaven.

The song is Woods' final Billboard Hot 100 entry, peaking at No. 84.

=== Chart performance ===
Chart (1982)	Peak position
US Billboard Hot 100	84
US Billboard Adult Contemporary	23
