= Bi-Coastal =

Studio album by Peter Allen
- Released: 20 June 1980
- Recorded: November 1979–February 1980
- Studios: Sunset Sound, Hollywood
- Genre: Pop
- Length: 41:18
- Label: A&M
- Producer: David Foster

Peter Allen chronology
I Could Have Been a Sailor (1979)	Bi-Coastal (1980)	The Very Best of Peter Allen (1982)

Singles from Bi-Coastal
- 1. "I Still Call Australia Home" Released: 1980; 2. "Bi-Coastal" Released: 1980; 3. "Fly Away" Released: 1981; 4. "One Step Over the Borderline" Released: 1981

Professional ratings
Review scores
Source	Rating
Billboard	(unrated)

Bi-Coastal is the sixth studio album by Australian singer and songwriter Peter Allen, released in 1980.

The album peaked at number 55 in Australia and number 123 on the US Billboard 200.

== Background ==
The album is Allen's most successful and was produced by David Foster who also wrote many of its songs. The hit "Fly Away", originally by Japanese artist Mariya Takeuchi, was co-written by Foster and Carole Bayer Sager. The title tune co-written by Foster and Tom Keane features double entendres comparing living on both coasts of the United States to Allen's own bisexuality. The album has become a classic with lovers of west coast pop music not just because of the songs but for the use of musicians like Toto, Steve Lukather, Jay Graydon and others.

== Track listing ==
The following listing is for the Australia and New Zealand release. The numbers indicated parenthetically in the track show the listing for the International release.

Side A
No.	Title	Writer(s)	Length
1.	"Fly Away" (2)	Sager, Foster, Allen	4:04
2.	"Bi-Coastal" (3)	Keane, Foster, Allen	4:22
3.	"I Don't Go Shopping" (4)	Lasley, Foster, Allen	3:33
4.	"One Step Over the Borderline" (1)	Allen	3:54
5.	"Simon" (8)	Foster, Allen	3:25
6.	"I Still Call Australia Home"	Allen	4:16

Side B
No.	Title	Writer(s)	Length
7.	"I Could Really Show You Around" (6)	Pitchford, Allen	4:13
8.	"Somebody's Angel" (7)	Lasley, Allen	4:17
9.	"Hit in the Heart" (5)	Allen	3:24
10.	"Pass this Time" (9)	Sager, Foster, Allen	4:00
11.	"When this Love Affair is Over" (10)	Foster, Allen	6:05

== Personnel ==
- Peter Allen – piano, keyboards
- David Foster – Fender Rhodes (1), synthesizer (1, 5, 8, 9) keyboards (2, 3, 4, 5, 6, 9, 10)
- Tom Keane – piano (1), Fender Rhodes (3), synthesizer (1, 5, 8)
- Steve Lukather – guitar (1, 3, 5, 9, 10), solo on 10
- Jay Graydon – guitar, guitar solo (9)
- David Williams – guitar (2)
- Richie Zito – guitar (6, 7)
- Mike Porcaro – bass (1–3, 5–7, 9, 10)
- Dave McDaniels – bass (4)
- Ed Greene – drums (1, 2, 3)
- Ralph Humphrey – drums (4, 7)
- Jeff Porcaro – drums (5, 9, 10)
- Carlos Vega – drums (6)
- Steve George – backing vocals (1–3, 5–7, 10)
- Richard Page – backing vocals (1–3, 5–7, 10)
- Gary Grant – trumpet
- Larry Hall – trumpet
- Gary Herbig – saxophone, sax solo (3)
- Jerry Hey – trumpet
- Kim Hutchcroft – trombone
- Eugene Meros – alto saxophone (2)
- Lon Price – alto saxophone (4)
- Bill Reichenbach Jr. – trombone
- Larry Williams – saxophone, synthesizer (9)
- José Rossy- percussion (9, 10)

== Charts ==
Chart (1981)	Peak position
Australian (Kent Music Report)	55
US Billboard 200	123
