= Continental American =

Studio album by Peter Allen
- Released: 15 November 1974
- Recorded: 1974
- Studio: Regent Sound Studios, New York City
- Genre: Adult contemporary
- Label: A&M
- Producer: Joel Dorn

Peter Allen chronology
| Tenterfield Saddler (1972) | Continental American (1974) | Taught by Experts (1976) |

Continental American is the third studio album by Peter Allen, released in 1974. The album was his first for A&M Records, and is notable for the inclusion of Allen's version of his co-authored hit for Olivia Newton-John, among others, "I Honestly Love You".

== History ==
Allen's previous two studio albums, Peter Allen (1971) and Tenterfield Saddler (1972) had been released on Metromedia Records, with modest results. Prior to the release of Continental American, Allen had assumed residency in New York City and had become a regular performer at the Reno Sweeney nightclub, owned and operated by composer Lewis Friedman between 1972 and 1977. A portrait of Allen, taken at Reno Sweeney's, is featured on the back cover of Continental American.

The album was later described by critic William Ruhlmann as involving a "retrospective, world-weary concept" and a "mood of desperate nostalgia", concluding that the album was "a dour singer/songwriter collection that used show business clichés in music and words to express a world view of regret and resignation."

Metromedia Records had ceased operations as of 1974, resulting in Allen's earlier albums becoming largely unavailable. He used the Continental American and later A&M releases as an opportunity to reintroduce some of his music. "Just Ask Me I've Been There", was originally recorded on the Tenterfield Saddler album. "Harbour", included on his follow-up Taught by Experts album (1976), was also originally from Tenterfield Saddler.

== Track listing ==
Side One

1. "Just a Gigolo (Schöner Gigolo)" (Irving Caesar, Leonello Casucci, Julius Brammer) 3:14
2. "Everything Old Is New Again" (Peter Allen, Sager) 2:35
3. "The Natural Thing to Do" (Allen, Sager) 4:11
4. "Pretty, Pretty" (Allen, Hal Hackady) 3:32
5. "Continental American" (Allen, Sager) 5:15

Side Two

1. "Just Ask Me I've Been There" (Allen) 4:35
2. "I Honestly Love You" (Allen, Jeff Barry) 3:32
3. "This Side Show's Leaving Town" (Allen, Sager) 7:38
4. "Just a Gigolo (Schöner Gigolo)" (Reprise) (Caesar, Casucci) 3:15

== Personnel ==
- Peter Allen - keyboards, percussion, vocals
- Julien Barber - viola
- Seymour Berger - trombone
- Alfred Brown - viola
- Garnett Brown - trombone
- Sam T. Brown - guitar
- James Buffington - French horn
- Francisco Centeno - bass
- Arthur Clark - saxophone
- Selwart Clarke - violin
- Harry Cykman - violin
- Joseph DeAngelis - French horn
- Jonathan Dorn - tuba
- Sue Evans - percussion
- Jon Faddis - trumpet
- Jeff Fura - project coordinator
- Steve Gadd - drums
- Paul Gershman - violin
- Peter Gordon - French horn
- Emanuel Green - violin
- John Gruhler - project coordinator
- Anthony Jackson - bass
- Jack Jeffers - trombone
- Arthur Jenkins - keyboards
- Jack Jennings - percussion
- Howard Johnson - tuba
- Walter Kane - saxophone
- Harry Kohn - violin
- Barry Korkin - project coordinator
- Phil Kross - percussion
- Beverly Lauridsen - cello
- Charles Libove - violin
- Bob Liftin - engineer
- Harry Lookofsky - violin
- Keith Loving - guitar
- Ralph MacDonald - percussion
- Joseph Malin - violin
- Dawn Maze - project coordinator
- Daniel Moore - trumpet
- Kermit Moore - cello
- David Nadien - violin
- Gene Orloff - violin
- Romeo Penque - clarinet
- Seldon Powell - clarinet, saxophone
- Matthew Raimondi - violin
- George Ricci - cello
- Ernie Royal - trumpet
- Bill Salter - bass guitar
- Sol Schlinger - saxophone
- Billy Slapin - clarinet, flute, saxophone
- Andrew Smith - drums
- David Spinozza - guitar
- Marvin Stamm - trumpet
- Tony Studd - euphonium
- Richard Tee - keyboards
- Brooks Tillotson - French horn
- John Tropea - guitar
- Emanuel Vardi - viola
- Harold Vick - saxophone
- Bill Watrous - trombone
- Frank Wess - flute, saxophone
- Joseph B. Wilder - trumpet

== Charts ==
The album entered the Australian top 100 in October 1977.

| Chart (1977) | Peak position |
|---|---|
| Australian (Kent Music Report) | 87 |
