= Tenterfield Saddler =

Single by Peter Allen

from the album Tenterfield Saddler
- Released: April 1972
- Recorded: 1971
- Genre: Pop, Country
- Length: 3:36
- Label: A&M
- Songwriter: Peter Allen
- Producers: Peter Allen, Brooks Arthur

Peter Allen singles chronology
"Just Ask Me I've Been There" (1972)	"Tenterfield Saddler" (1972)	"I Honestly Love You" (1977)

"Tenterfield Saddler" is a country song written by Peter Allen in 1970. It was released in 1972 as the second single from his second studio album of the same name.

Tenterfield Saddler tells the moving story of the musician's life, from his much-loved grandfather, George Woolnough, his troubled relationship with his father and moving to New York to marry Liza Minnelli, "a girl with an interesting face".

The lyric "been all 'round the world and lives no special place", is compared to a lyric of another of his songs, "no matter how far or how wide I roam, I still call Australia home" in "I Still Call Australia Home".

== Charts ==
"Tenterfield Saddler" made its ARIA chart debut in September 2015 following the screening of the Peter Allen Australian mini-series, Peter Allen: Not the Boy Next Door.

Chart (2015)	Peak position
Australia (ARIA)	53

== Cover versions ==
- In 1993, Rick Price performed a live tribute to Allen at the ARIA Music Awards of 1993. This version was later included on his 2004 album, The Essential Collection.
- In 1996 Colleen Hewett covered the song on her album, Tenterfield Dreams.
- In 2002, Olivia Newton-John covered the song (with Peter Allen) for her album, 2.
- In 2004, Hugh Jackman recorded the song for The Boy from Oz Broadway Cast Album.
- In 2007, Lee Kernaghan covered the song on his album, Spirit of the Bush.
- In 2015, John Farnham and Olivia Newton-John sang a duet on their album Two Strong Hearts Live that they performed on the tour in 2015.
