= Not the Boy Next Door =

Studio album by Peter Allen
- Released: 11 March 1983
- Recorded: 1982
- Genre: Pop; stage and screen
- Length: 39:57
- Label: Arista
- Producer: Richard Landis

Peter Allen chronology
The Very Best of Peter Allen (1982)	Not the Boy Next Door (1983)	Captured Live at Carnegie Hall (1985)

Professional ratings
Review scores
Source	Rating
AllMusic	2.5/5 stars

Not the Boy Next Door is the seventh and penultimate studio album by Australian singer and songwriter Peter Allen released in March 1983. This was his first release for Arista Records.

The album peaked at number 36 on the Australian Kent Music Report and number 170 on the American Billboard 200.

Its four singles—"Not the Boy Next Door", "You Haven't Heard the Last of Me", "Once Before I Go" and "You and Me (We Wanted It All)"—all reached the Billboard Adult Contemporary chart.

== Background ==
In 1981, Allen had enjoyed his first US charting single with "Fly Away". The same year, "Arthur's Theme (Best That You Can Do)", which he co-wrote, topped the charts and won an Academy Award for Best Original Song and Golden Globe Award for Best Original Song. In 1982, Allen's first greatest hits album was released, ending his contract with A&M Records. Allen signed to Arista Records, home of similar artist, Barry Manilow, in hope of the record company support he needed to pursue his career.

== Reviews ==
William Ruhlmann from AllMusic said of the album: "The nine songs on Not the Boy Next Door seemed to have been carefully fashioned to fit into current radio formats, but perhaps they had been tailored too well", adding the songs echoed the early 1980s dance-pop and pop/rock that never quite worked.

== Track listing ==
=== Side A ===
1. "Just Another Make-Out Song" (Peter Allen, David Foster) – 4:10
2. "Not the Boy Next Door" (Allen, Dean Pitchford) – 6:52
3. "You'll Always Get Your Way" (Allen, Tom Keane) – 4:32
4. "You and Me" (Allen, Carole Bayer Sager) – 4:14

=== Side B ===
1. "Fade to Black" (Allen) – 3:53
2. "Somebody's Got Your Love" (Dick St Nicklaus) – 3:34
3. "You Haven't Heard the Last of Me" (Eric Kaz, Tom Snow) – 4:14
4. "Easy on the Weekend" (Allen) – 4:00
5. "Once Before I Go" (Allen, Pitchford) – 4:22

== Charts ==
Chart (1983)	Peak position
Australian (Kent Music Report)	36
