= I Could Have Been a Sailor =

Studio album by Peter Allen
- Released: 7 September 1979
- Recorded: 1979
- Studio: Wally Heider Studios, Hollywood and Sound Mixer Studios, New York City
- Genre: Adult contemporary
- Label: A&M
- Producer: Marvin Hamlisch, Mike Post

Peter Allen chronology
It Is Time for Peter Allen (1977)	I Could Have Been a Sailor (1979)	Bi-Coastal (1980)

I Could Have Been a Sailor is a 1979 album by singer-songwriter Peter Allen, released on A&M Records. It is notable as containing Allen's versions of his songs "Don't Cry Out Loud" and "I'd Rather Leave While I'm in Love", which were major successes, as covered by others.

== History ==
I Could Have Been a Sailor was Peter Allen's fifth studio album, and his third for A&M Records. It followed the double-album live release, It Is Time for Peter Allen (1977), on the same label. The album is notable for its association with producer Marvin Hamlisch. Allen also performs his versions of three songs he co-wrote with Carole Bayer-Sager, "Don't Go Looking", "Don't Cry Out Loud" and "I'd Rather Leave While I'm in Love".

"Don't Cry Out Loud" had been popularized by Melissa Manchester prior to Allen's release. Manchester's recording of the song was released in late 1978 and spent 20 weeks on the Billboard Hot 100 chart. It was also the title song of Manchester's related album. The song had been co-written by Allen and Carol Bayer-Sager; Bayer-Sager was also a co-writer with Manchester. "I'd Rather Leave While I'm in Love" was popularized by Rita Coolidge in 1979, as well as being recorded by Dusty Springfield, among others.

The album was Allen's first to make the US albums chart, peaking at No. 171 on the Billboard 200. The album has been subject to limited reissue on CD. It was reissued on CD in 2001 in Japan, on Universal/A&M. It has not been reissued on CD in North America or elsewhere.

== Track listing ==
All tracks composed by Peter Allen; except where indicated

1. "I Could Have Been a Sailor"
2. "Don't Wish Too Hard"
3. "Two Boys"
4. "Angels With Dirty Faces" (Allen, Adrienne Anderson)
5. "Don't Cry Out Loud" (Allen, Carole Bayer Sager)
6. "If You Were Wondering"
7. "Don't Leave Me Now"
8. "I'd Rather Leave While I'm in Love" (Allen, Sager)
9. "We've Come to an Understanding"
10. "Paris at 21"

== Personnel ==
- Peter Allen - keyboards, piano, vocals
- Michael Boddicker - programming
- Velton Ray Bunch - arranger
- Paulinho Da Costa - percussion
- Linda Dillard - backing vocals
- Victor Feldman - percussion, timpani
- Dan Ferguson - guitar
- Venetta Fields - backing vocals
- Jay Graydon - guitar
- Ed Greene - drums
- Marvin Hamlisch - arranger, piano, producer
- Geoff Howe - percussion
- Clydie King - backing vocals
- Larry Knechtel - keyboards
- Abraham Laboriel - bass
- Will Lee - bass
- Jimmy Maelen - percussion
- Rick Marotta - drums
- Sherlie Matthews - backing vocals
- Marti McCall - backing vocals
- Ray Parker Jr. - guitar
- Dave Parlato - bass
- Herb Pedersen - backing vocals
- Greg Phillinganes - synthesizer
- Jim Pierce - bass
- Mike Post - arranger, percussion
- Bruce Roberts - backing vocals
- Dan Sawyer - guitar
- Joey Scarbury - backing vocals
- Steve Schaeffer - drums
- Leland Sklar - bass
- David Spinozza - guitar
- Fred Tackett - guitar
- Richard Tee - keyboards
- John Tropea - guitar

== Charts ==
Chart (1979)	Peak position
Australian (Kent Music Report)	69
