= Peter Allen (musician) =

Australian singer-songwriter (1944–1992)

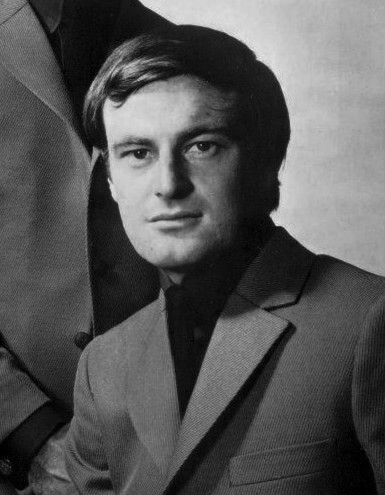
- Allen in 1967

Background information
- Born: Peter Richard Woolnough; 10 February 1944; Tenterfield, New South Wales, Australia
- Died: 18 June 1992 (aged 48) San Diego, California, U.S.
- Genre: Pop
- Occupations: Singer-songwriter; musician; entertainer
- Instruments: Vocals; piano
- Years active: 1959–1992
- Labels: Metromedia; A&M Records; Arista; RCA Victor
- Formerly of: The Allen Brothers
- Spouse: Liza Minnelli (m. 1967; div. 1974)
- Partner: Gregory Connell (1973–1984; his death)

Peter Allen (born Peter Richard Woolnough; 10 February 1944 – 18 June 1992) was an Australian singer-songwriter, musician, and entertainer, known for his flamboyant stage persona, energetic performances, and lavish costumes. Allen's songs were made popular by many recording artists, including Elkie Brooks, Melissa Manchester and Olivia Newton-John, including Newton-John's first chart-topping hit "I Honestly Love You", and the chart-topping and Academy Award-winning "Arthur's Theme (Best That You Can Do)" by Christopher Cross.

In addition to recording many albums, Allen enjoyed a cabaret and concert career, including appearances at the Radio City Music Hall riding a camel. His patriotic song "I Still Call Australia Home" has been used extensively in advertising campaigns, and was added to the National Film and Sound Archive's Sounds of Australia registry in 2013.

Allen was the first husband of Liza Minnelli. They met in October 1964, were engaged on 26 November 1964, married on 3 March 1967, formally separated on 8 April 1970, and divorced on 24 July 1974. Allen had a long-term partner, model Gregory Connell. They met in 1973 and were together until Connell's death in 1984. Allen and Connell died from AIDS-related cancer eight years apart; Allen was one of the first well-known Australians to die from AIDS. Allen remained ambiguous about his sexuality in that he did not pretend to be heterosexual after divorcing Minnelli, but never publicly came out as gay either.

In a 1991 interview with the gay newspaper New York Native, Allen said, "I was 'out' on stage years before anyone else. But I think outing is limiting. I don't feel like I should be labeled." Despite Allen's outgoing persona, he was an intensely private man who shared little about his personal life even with those close to him. Allen did not say he had HIV/AIDS, partly in fear of alienating conservative, heterosexual fans and partly from thinking audiences would not want to see a performer they knew was sick. In 1998, a musical about his life, The Boy from Oz, debuted in Australia. It ran on Broadway and earned Hugh Jackman the Tony Award for Best Actor in a Musical.

== Early life ==
Allen was born Peter Richard Woolnough on 10 February 1944, to Richard John Woolnough, soldier and grocer, and his wife, Marion Bryden (née Davidson), at Prince Albert Memorial Hospital in Tenterfield, New South Wales, a small Australian country town where his grandfather, George Woolnough, worked as a saddler. He had one sibling, a younger sister named Lynne. Allen grew up in nearby Armidale and lived there from about six weeks of age until he was 14. This is also where he first learned piano and dance. Allen's performing career began when he was 11, playing the piano in the ladies' lounge of the New England Hotel in Armidale.

Richard Woolnough became a violent alcoholic after returning from World War II. In November 1958, he died by suicide by gunshot when Allen was 14. Soon after his father's suicide, Allen left school with an Intermediate Certificate and moved to Lismore with his mother and sister to live with relatives. His grandfather, George Woolnough, never understood or got over this devastating event. This tale is told in Allen's 1972 country song "Tenterfield Saddler".

In 1959, Allen went to Surfers Paradise to look for work and met Chris Bell, an English-born singer-guitarist. Assisted by Chris Bell's father, Peter, and inspired by The Everly Brothers, they formed a singing duo called the Allen Brothers. Allen began performing as "Peter Allen" around the same time. Within a year, they were based in Sydney performing on the Australian music television program Bandstand. In 1964, Mark Herron, the husband of Judy Garland, discovered The Allen Brothers while they were performing in Hong Kong. They became Judy Garland's opening act when she toured. Charmed by Allen, Judy served as a matchmaker between him and her daughter, Liza Minnelli. The Allen Brothers act broke up in the spring of 1970.

== Career ==
Allen started releasing solo recordings in 1971, but throughout his career achieved greater success through his songs being recorded by others. Allen scored his biggest success with the song "I Honestly Love You", which he co-wrote with Jeff Barry and which became a major hit in 1974 for Olivia Newton-John. Her single reached number one in the United States and Canada and won two Grammy Awards, for Record of the Year and Best Female Pop Vocal Performance for Newton-John. Allen also co-wrote "Don't Cry Out Loud" with Carole Bayer Sager, popularized by Melissa Manchester in 1978, and "I'd Rather Leave While I'm in Love", also co-written with Bayer Sager and popularized by Rita Coolidge in 1979. One of his signature songs, "I Go to Rio", co-written with Adrienne Anderson, was popularized in America by the group Pablo Cruise.

In 1976, Allen released an album, Taught by Experts, which reached number one in Australia, along with the number one single "I Go to Rio" and the Top 10 hit of a Harry Warren standard "The More I See You". The album also included the song "Quiet Please, There's A Lady On Stage" which was recorded by many artists including Jack Jones and Dusty Springfield. Although his recording career in the US never progressed, he performed in Atlantic City and at Carnegie Hall. He had three extended sold-out engagements at New York City's Radio City Music Hall, where he became the first male dancer to dance with The Rockettes and rode a camel during "I Go to Rio". This performance was broadcast live and exclusively on subscription television service WHT The Movie Network.

Allen's most successful album was Bi-Coastal (1980), produced by David Foster and featuring the single "Fly Away", which in 1981 became his only US chart single, reaching No. 55 on the Billboard Hot 100. In addition, Allen co-wrote the Patti LaBelle hit "I Don't Go Shopping", which reached the top 30 on the R&B chart in 1980.

Allen co-wrote the song "Arthur's Theme (Best That You Can Do)" with Burt Bacharach, Carole Bayer Sager and Christopher Cross, for the 1981 film Arthur. The song reached number one in the US and the songwriters won an Academy Award for Best Song. One lyric for the song, "If you get caught between the moon and New York City", was adapted from an earlier song that he and Bayer Sager co-wrote. Allen and Bayer Sager also co-wrote "You and Me (We Wanted It All)", which was recorded by Frank Sinatra for his 1980 album Trilogy. A video of Sinatra singing the song at Carnegie Hall was included as part of the Sinatra: New York live performance box set, released in late 2009.

Allen performed on Australian television for many important occasions: in front of Queen Elizabeth II in 1980 at the Sydney Opera House, before Prince Charles and Princess Diana, once in Melbourne and again in Sydney in 1981, at the opening of the Sydney Entertainment Centre in 1983, where he unveiled for the first time his Australian "Flag" shirt, and the 1980 VFL Grand Final in Melbourne. His "Up in One Concert" of 1980 was a big ratings success across the country. When Australia won the America's Cup in 1983, he flew to Perth to sing before an audience of 100,000. In 1988, he opened for Frank Sinatra at Sanctuary Cove, Queensland. In America, he appeared at the 30th anniversary of Disneyland. He returned to recording on Arista with an album entitled Not the Boy Next Door (1983). In 1990, he recorded his final album on RCA Victor, Making Every Moment Count, which featured Melissa Manchester and Harry Connick Jr. The song "Making Every Moment Count", a duet with Manchester, was co-written by Seth Swirsky, who also produced a number of songs he co-wrote with Allen, including Allen's last-released single, "Tonight You Made My Day".

One of his songs, '"I Still Call Australia Home", became popular through its use in television commercials, initially for National Panasonic and, since 1987, for Qantas.

Allen's most covered song is "I Honestly Love You".

On 23 September 2025, Barry Manilow released the Allen-penned (along with Dean Pitchford) song "Once Before I Go", a single from his forthcoming album What a Time. The song originally appeared on Allen's 1983 Album Not the Boy Next Door.

=== Broadway ===
Allen made his Broadway debut on 12 January 1971, in Soon, a rock opera that opened at the Ritz Theatre and ran for three performances. He starred in his own one-man revue on Broadway at the Biltmore Theatre, Up in One: More Than a Concert (1979), which ran for 46 performances.

Allen recorded a live album called Captured Live at Carnegie Hall, in which songs from his musical Legs Diamond, were previewed. Legs Diamond opened on Broadway at the Mark Hellinger Theatre on 26 December 1988, with a book co-written by Harvey Fierstein. The musical ran for 64 performances and 72 previews. After Legs Diamond closed he returned to concert work, touring with Bernadette Peters during the summer of 1989. Allen and Peters also performed in the 1983 Academy Award broadcast in an extended musical tribute to Irving Berlin.

=== Other work ===
During his career, Allen and his music appeared in other television shows, films, and programs. In 1978, Allen appeared in a cameo role in the film Sgt. Pepper's Lonely Hearts Club Band. The next year, his live version of "Everything Old is New Again" was included on the soundtrack of the film All That Jazz.

Allen was also the musical guest and emcee at Miss Universe 1981.

In 1982, Allen performed as the Pirate King in a televised version of The Pirates of Penzance. He later appeared in the TV series Miami Vice's second-season premiere episode, "The Prodigal Son" in 1985.

Five years later, Allen was involved in a pilot for a new Name That Tune show in 1990, and the pilot for what became CBS's short-lived prime-time game show The Hollywood Game in 1991. Allen died the day The Hollywood Game debuted; it ended up being hosted by Bob Goen due to Allen's illness.

== Personal life ==
Though flamboyant on stage, Allen was quite the opposite offstage. He once remarked, "I'm not the let's-tear-his-clothes-off type. I'm fairly quiet. The maniac only comes out when I hit the stage. I have to be a different person offstage. If I were to try to keep that up 24 hours a day, I would have a nervous breakdown." Allen described his stage persona as "a much more interesting person than me. I think that's why I'm in show business, to get to be that other person." Allen further depicted his stage persona as "someone much taller, much handsomer, with a better hairline." Although Allen described himself as "so boring" when not performing, he enjoyed swimming; wind surfing; skiing; water skiing; sailing; collecting Hawaiian shirts; reading; cooking; and growing flowers, herbs, and vegetables. Allen spent so much time working in his yard that he imagined his neighbors thought he was a landscape gardener.

Allen owned a beach house in Leucadia, California (north of San Diego), a place he called a 'shack' in Oak Beach, Queensland, Australia, and a penthouse apartment in Manhattan. While visiting Gregory Connell's parents in Leucadia in 1975, Allen learned there was a nearby house for sale and so purchased his first house with the earnings made from his 1974 song, "I Honestly Love You". The area was quiet and far enough away from Los Angeles that he did not get people dropping in because they were in the neighborhood. He wrote the 1976 song "Puttin' Out Roots" about his move to Leucadia. The living room of Allen's Leucadia beach house is featured on the cover of his 1979 album, I Could Have Been a Sailor.

Allen met Liza Minnelli at Heathrow Airport on 28 October 1964, where she and her mother Judy Garland were rehearsing for their upcoming performance at the London Palladium in early November. They were engaged a month later on 26 November 1964, at Trader Vic's, a restaurant at the London Hilton. They married in New York City on 3 March 1967, formally separated on 8 April 1970, and divorced on 24 July 1974.

Allen became more comfortable with his homosexuality in the early 1970s. He explained, "I was afraid as a teen, that if I acknowledged that I preferred my own kind, my family would stop loving me. We do tend to underrate our families." Allen and Gregory Connell (1949–1984) met when Greg and a mutual friend attended Peter's show at New York's Continental Baths in 1973. Greg thought Peter was working too hard for the money he was getting and so helped him get his first band together, while Peter found him "gorgeous", "sweet", and good-hearted. According to Allen's biographer Stephen MacLean, Connell was "Peter's big love." Connell, a fashion and print model originally from Texas, attracted major clients, such as Coca-Cola and did lucrative print ads and commercials. Moreover, he acted in community and dinner theatres and sang in a group called "Voice Six". After they got together, Connell left his modeling career to support Allen's music career by becoming his lighting and staging director and tour manager. This arrangement enabled them to be together while Allen performed around the world. Connell also sang backup on Allen's 1976 song, "I Go to Rio". He did so much work behind the scenes that Peter once remarked, "Gregory does everything but get up here and sing!" After becoming ill in late 1982, Connell died from AIDS-related pneumonia on 11 September 1984, at their home in Leucadia.

Although Allen wrote "Once Before I Go" in 1982 for good friend Ann-Margret to use as a closing song at her concerts, the song took on new meaning when he sang it. According to the song's co-writer Dean Pitchford, by the time Peter was going into the studio to work on the Not The Boy Next Door album (1983), Greg's [AIDS] diagnosis was clear. Therefore, Peter wanted to honor him with this ballad. However, since the song was written specifically for Ann-Margret, Peter had Dean make a small tweak to the lyrics that would personalize it to his and Greg's story. So, the last verse changed from "The air I breathe/My morning sun/You'll be with me in years to come" to "You are the light that shines on me/You always were and you'll always be" to reference Connell's role as Allen's lighting director. Allen told Pitchford that "it was the one song he related most to Greg; that he thought of Greg as he sang it, Greg behind the lights at all of his shows." Allen further told Pitchford that "after Gregory died, he would always look into the spotlight and imagine that Gregory was behind the light."

Allen dedicated his 1985 album, Captured Live at Carnegie Hall, to Connell and sang songs in his memory at AIDS benefit concerts. After Connell's death, Allen poured himself even more into his work. Allen spent several years getting his musical Legs Diamond on Broadway (it premiered in 1988), recorded his final album Making Every Moment Count in 1990, and continued performing in concerts and doing various benefits until his death in 1992 at the age of 48.

== Death and legacy ==
Allen's last performance was on 26 January 1992, in Sydney, and he was diagnosed with an AIDS-related throat cancer shortly after. Allen spent his final days at his beach house in Leucadia. He died at Mercy Hospital, San Diego, on 18 June 1992. A private memorial service was held on 21 June 1992, at his home in Leucadia, where his ashes were scattered in the Pacific Ocean within sight of his house.

A documentary titled The Boy from Oz about Allen was produced after his death, featuring clips from his performances as well as interviews with performers who worked with him.

A stage musical based on his life, also titled The Boy from Oz, opened in Australia in 1998. Using his largely autobiographical songs, the production starred Todd McKenney as Allen and Christina Amphlett of the rock group Divinyls as Judy Garland. In 2003, the musical opened on Broadway, becoming the first Australian musical ever to be performed there. In this production, Allen was played by Hugh Jackman, who won a Tony Award for his portrayal in 2004. Jackman performed this role again two years later when the show toured large arenas in Australia under the title The Boy from Oz: Arena Spectacular. A TV mini series, Peter Allen: Not the Boy Next Door, was broadcast in Australia in 2015 with Joel Jackson playing the adult Allen and Ky Baldwin playing him as a youth. Supporting roles were played by Rebecca Gibney as Marion Woolnough (Allen's mother), Sarah West as Liza Minnelli and Sigrid Thornton as Judy Garland.

Allen was inducted into the ARIA Hall of Fame in 1993.

On 26 November 2005, an extension of the Tenterfield Library was opened and named the "George Woolnough Wing", named after Allen's paternal grandfather who was memorialized in his song, "Tenterfield Saddler".

On 29 June 2026, Allen was honored with a Blue Plaque sponsored by the Government of New South Wales. The Blue Plaque is located at the Armidale Folk Museum where Allen took dance classes as a child.

== In popular culture ==
In the 1979 film All That Jazz, Allen's live rendition of "Everything Old Is New Again" is danced to by Ann Reinking and Erzebet Foldi for Roy Scheider's character Joe Gideon based on dancer Bob Fosse.

Hugh Jackman's performance of Allen's "Once Before I Go" (from The Boy from Oz) was featured in a montage dedicated to Alex Trebek in his final episode of Jeopardy! which aired on 8 January 2021, exactly two months after Trebek's death from stage IV pancreatic cancer on 8 November 2020, at the age of 80.

La Casa Azul's song Terry, Peter y yo makes reference to Allen, Judy Garland, and Liza Minnelli.

In September 2025, Barry Manilow released a single of the Peter Allen/Dean Pitchford song "Once Before I Go", which will be on his forthcoming album What A Time.

== Discography ==
=== Studio albums ===
Year	Album details	Peak chart positions		Certification
Year	Album details	AUS	US	Certification
1971	Peter Allen: Label: Metromedia	—	—	
1972	Tenterfield Saddler: Label: Metromedia	95 (Note: The album Tenterfield Saddler did not chart in Australia until January 1980.)	—	
1974	Continental American: Label: A&M	87 (Note: The album Continental American did not chart in Australia until October 1977.)	—	
1976	Taught by Experts: Label: A&M	11	—	ARIA: Gold
1979	I Could Have Been a Sailor: Label: A&M	69	171	
1980	Bi-Coastal: Label: A&M	55	123	
1983	Not the Boy Next Door: Label: Arista	36	170	
1990	Making Every Moment Count: Label: RCA	—	—	

=== Live albums ===
Year	Album details	Peak chart positions
Year	Album details	AUS
1977	It Is Time for Peter Allen: Label: A&M	30
1985	Captured Live at Carnegie Hall: Label: Arista Records	—

=== Compilation albums ===
Year	Album details	Peak chart positions	Certification
Year	Album details	AUS	Certification
1982	The Very Best of Peter Allen / The Best: Label: A&M	9	AUS: Gold
1992	The Very Best of Peter Allen: The Boy from Down Under: Label: A&M	16	
1993	At His Best: Label: A&M	—	
1995	The Boy from Oz: Label: A&M	35	
1998	Singer-Songwriter: The Anthology: Label: A&M	—	
2001	20th Century Masters: The Best of Peter Allen: Label: A&M	—	
2006	The Ultimate Peter Allen: Label: Universal	18 (Note: The album The Ultimate Peter Allen reached its peak position in Australia in September 2015.)	

=== Singles ===
Year	Single	Peak chart positions						Album
Year	Single	AUS	US	US AC	NZ	NLD	BEL	Album
1971	"Honest Queen"	—	—	—	—	—	—	Peter Allen
1972	"Just Ask Me I've Been There"	—	—	—	—	—	—	Tenterfield Saddler
1972	"Tenterfield Saddler"	53 (Note: The single "Tenterfield Saddler" reached its peak position in Australia in September 2015.)	—	—	—	—	—	Tenterfield Saddler
1975	"I Honestly Love You"	—	—	—	—	—	—	Continental American
1975	"She Loves to Hear the Music"	—	—	—	—	—	—	Taught by Experts
1976	"The More I See You"	80	108	40	—	—	—	Taught by Experts
1976	"I Go to Rio"	1	—	—	22	27	30	Taught by Experts
1977	"The More I See You" (re-release)	10	—	—	—	—	—	Taught by Experts
1978	"Don't Cry Out Loud"	—	—	—	—	—	—	I Could Have Been a Sailor
1979	"Don't Wish Too Hard"	—	—	—	—	—	—	I Could Have Been a Sailor
1979	"I Could Have Been a Sailor"	—	—	—	—	—	—	I Could Have Been a Sailor
1980	"I Still Call Australia Home"	60 (Note: The single "I Still Call Australia Home" reached its peak position in Australia in September 2015.)	—	—	—	—	—	Bi-Coastal
1980	"Bi-Coastal"	78	—	—	—	—	—	Bi-Coastal
1981	"Fly Away"	—	55	45	—	—	—	Bi-Coastal
1981	"One Step Over the Borderline"	—	—	—	—	—	—	Bi-Coastal
1983	"Not the Boy Next Door"	76	—	—	—	—	—	Not the Boy Next Door
1983	"You Haven't Heard the Last of Me"	—	—	15	—	—	—	Not the Boy Next Door
1983	"Once Before I Go"	—	—	26	—	—	—	Not the Boy Next Door
1984	"You and Me (We Wanted It All)"	—	—	41	—	—	—	Not the Boy Next Door

== Awards and honors ==
=== Academy Awards ===
Peter Allen won an Academy Award (Oscar) for Best Original Song for "Arthur's Theme (Best That You Can Do)" in 1981.

Year	Nominee / work	Award	Result (wins only)
54th Academy Awards	Peter Allen, Burt Bacharach, Christopher Cross, & Carole Bayer Sager	Best Original Song - Arthur's Theme (Best That You Can Do)	Won

=== Ambassador-at-Large for Canberra ===
On 29 September 1981, Peter Allen was commissioned as Canberra's first ambassador-at-large by the Minister of State for the Capital Territory, Michael Hodgman. At the ceremony, Peter was presented with the Keys of Canberra and a scroll setting out his commission.

Year	Nominee / work	Award	Result
1981	Peter Allen	Ambassador-at-Large for Canberra - in appreciation of work performed and personal effort expended in advancing the status of Canberra as Australia's National Capital.	Won

=== American Society of Composers, Authors and Publishers (ASCAP) Awards ===
The ASCAP Awards honors its top members in a series of annual awards shows in seven different music categories: pop, rhythm and soul, film and television, Latin, country, Christian, and concert music.

Year	Nominee / work	Award	Result
ASCAP Film and Television Music Awards 1991	Peter Allen, Burt Bacharach, Christopher Cross, & Carole Bayer Sager	Most Performed Feature Film Standards - Arthur's Theme (Best That You Can Do)	Won

=== Australian Entertainment Mo Awards ===
The Australian Entertainment Mo Awards (commonly known informally as the Mo Awards), were annual Australian entertainment industry awards. They recognised achievements in live entertainment in Australia from 1975 to 2016. Peter Allen won two awards in that time. They later named an award after him called the "Peter Allen Performer of the Year" Award.

Year	Nominee / work	Award	Result
1983	Peter Allen	International Act of the Year	Won
1984	Peter Allen	International Act of the Year	Won

=== Australasian Performing Right Association (APRA) Awards ===
The APRA Awards were established in 1982 to honour songwriters, composers and publishers that achieved artistic excellence and outstanding success in their fields.

Year	Nominee / work	Award	Result
APRA Music Awards of 1982	Peter Allen, Burt Bacharach, Christopher Cross, & Carole Bayer Sager	Most Performed Foreign Work - Arthur's Theme (Best That You Can Do)	Won

=== Australian Recording Industry Association (ARIA) Music Awards ===
The ARIA Music Awards is an annual awards ceremony that recognises excellence, innovation, and achievement across all genres of Australian music. They commenced in 1987. Allen was inducted into the Hall of Fame in 1993.

Year	Nominee / work	Award	Result
ARIA Music Awards of 1993	Peter Allen	ARIA Hall of Fame	Inductee

=== Golden Globes ===
Peter Allen won a Golden Globe for Best Original Song for "Arthur's Theme (Best That You Can Do)" in 1981.

Year	Nominee / work	Award	Result
39th Golden Globe Awards	Peter Allen, Burt Bacharach, Christopher Cross, & Carole Bayer Sager	Best Original Song - Arthur's Theme (Best That You Can Do)	Won

=== Grammy Awards ===
Peter Allen was nominated twice for a Grammy Award for Song of the Year in 1974 for "I Honestly Love You" and in 1981 for "Arthur's Theme (Best That You Can Do)".

Year	Nominee / work	Award	Result
24th Annual Grammy Awards	Peter Allen & Jeff Barry	Song of the Year - I Honestly Love You (Single)	Nominated
17th Annual Grammy Awards	Peter Allen, Burt Bacharach, Christopher Cross, & Carole Bayer Sager	Song of the Year - Arthur's Theme (Best That You Can Do)	Nominated

=== Manhattan Association of Cabarets (MAC) Awards ===
Since 1986, the MAC Awards are presented annually by the Manhattan Association of Cabarets to those who have made a contribution to live entertainment. Peter Allen received the Lifetime Achievement Award in 1987.

Year	Nominee / work	Award	Result
1st Annual MAC Awards	Peter Allen	Lifetime Achievement Award	Won

=== National Academy of Concert and Cabaret Artists Awards ===
Peter Allen won The National Academy of Concert and Cabaret Artists Award for Best Male Vocalist in 1981. Allen received the award during his performance at Radio City Music Hall in January 1981.

Year	Nominee / work	Award	Result
1981	Peter Allen	Best Male Vocalist	Won

=== Order of Australia ===
The Order of Australia is an honour that recognises Australian citizens and other persons for outstanding achievement and service. It was established on 14 February 1975, by Elizabeth II, Queen of Australia, on the advice of the Australian Government.

Year	Nominee / work	Award	Result
1990	Peter Allen	Order of Australia, Member in the General Division (AM) - for service to the performing arts, particularly as a songwriter.	Won

=== Ruby Awards ===
The Ruby Awards were presented annually by After Dark for distinguished work in the entertainment field. In 1978, Peter Allen received the Ruby Award for Performer of the Year.

Year	Nominee / work	Award	Result
8th Annual Ruby Awards	Peter Allen	Performer of the Year	Won
