= I Still Call Australia Home =

Song by Peter Allen

from the album Bi-Coastal
- Language: English
- Released: June 1980
- Recorded: 1979
- Songwriter: Peter Allen
- Lyricist: Peter Allen

"I Still Call Australia Home" is a song written by Peter Allen in 1980. In it, Allen sings of Australian expatriates' longing for home.

== Significance to Australian culture ==
It has been used to signify Australian patriotism and nostalgia for home. An example is the series of Qantas television commercials where it was sung either by individual Australian musicians or one of several Australian youth choirs. This is also remade in their 2020 safety video, where various covers of the song were made accompanying a 100-year history visualization.

In the 1984 Summer Olympics' Opening Gala TV special (in Los Angeles), Olivia Newton-John performed this song from Sydney, Australia with the choir in a medley with "Waltzing Matilda." Later, both songs were used in the musical about Allen's life, The Boy from Oz, in which Hugh Jackman starred as Allen.

"I Still Call Australia Home" was added to the National Film and Sound Archive's Sounds of Australia registry in 2013.

In Australian English speech of earlier generations, "home" referred to Britain. Thus by contrast, "calling Australia home" became for a period a particularly piquant expression of Australian identity.

== Charts ==
"I Still Call Australia Home" peaked at number 72 on the Australian singles chart in June 1980 when it was originally released, but re-entered the charts and peaked at number 60 in September 2015 following the screening of the mini-series Peter Allen: Not the Boy Next Door.

== Use ==
- The song was used as the closing for Australia Day celebrations at Darling Harbour, Sydney in 1994; it was performed and arranged by Noel Elmowy, and sung by Chris Lloyds and Andrew Oh, with Prince Charles in attendance.
- The song was used in the evening closing sequence for Tasmanian television station TNT and later by TVT.
- In one version of the song popularly used by Qantas, "Rio" is replaced by "Rome" as Qantas does not operate flights to Rio de Janeiro, but flew to the Italian capital at the time the video was made.
  - The version of the song used by Qantas in its 2009 advertisement replaces the entire first verse with one sung in Kala Lagaw Ya, a dialect of the Torres Strait Islands. This version was performed by the Gondwana National Indigenous Children's Choir and the Sydney Children's Choir as well as the Australian Girls Choir and National Boys Choir.
  - Qantas later reused the song as part of safety videos since 2018, with the 2018 safety video recorded in many parts around the world, including New York and London. In addition, "Rio" was used in this version of the song instead of "Rome". When Qantas was celebrating the centennial anniversary of its foundation, the instrumental version of the song tailored to each time period portrayed in the safety video (with a children's choir singing at the end).
- The song is a popular inclusion in the repertoire of several Welsh male voice choirs, including the Australian Welsh Male Choir and Morriston Orpheus Choir. The Welsh version replaces "London" in the line "from New York, to Rome, and old London town", with "Swansea".
- Australian comedy team The Chaser composed a parody of the Qantas version of the song, called "I Still Call Australia 51 per cent Home" in response to Qantas outsourcing some of its engineering services to Singapore Airlines and Lufthansa.
- At the Formula 1 2002 Australian Grand Prix, Australian driver Mark Webber finished an impressive 5th place on his F1 debut for the underfunded and struggling Minardi team, scoring valuable points for the team which helped them finish 9th of 11 in that season's constructors championship. The Australian Grand Prix Corporation's chairman Ron Walker convinced Webber and Minardi team owner and fellow Australian Paul Stoddart to celebrate their achievement with an impromptu ceremony on the podium, where I Still Call Australia Home was played in place of the Australian national anthem.
- The song was performed by Chris Lilley in episodes one and two of "We Can Be Heroes: Finding The Australian of the Year" (2005).
- The song was performed by singer Kylie Minogue in the Sound Relief concert in benefit of the victims of the Australian Bushfires on 14 March 2009.
- The song featured as pre-game entertainment at the 2009 AFL Grand Final, performed by the 'Qantas choir' and the Gondwana National Indigenous Children's Choir.
- The song was performed by Nicole Kidman, Keith Urban, Hugh Jackman, Olivia Newton-John and Russell Crowe to close Oprah Winfrey's Australian Adventure during her final season on broadcast television. This performance originally aired on US television on Friday, 21 January 2011.
- The naming ceremony for Qantas' A380, VH-OQA, the Nancy Bird Walton, the flagship of their fleet, features a choir singing this song
- The song was adapted and translated into French by Sylvie Boisel. The title is L'Australie est ma patrie. She performed it at Sydney Town Hall for the Prime Minister of Australia John Howard and the Wallabies in 2007.
- The song was performed by a choir at the opening ceremonies of the 1982 Commonwealth Games in Brisbane.
- Australian comedian and musician Tim Minchin uploaded a parody of the song called "I Still Call Australia Homophobic" to his Facebook page in reference to the same-sex marriage debate and proposed 2017 survey in Australia.
- The Australian hip hop group TLK used the song as the inspiration for their 2006 song "I still call Australia home" which referenced historical violence against Aboriginal people.
- The Australian vocal group The Ten Tenors regularly performs "I Still Call Australia Home" in their concerts.
- Australian tenor Stuart Skelton performed the song at the Last Night of the Proms 2021 at the Royal Albert Hall.
