= The More I See You =

1945 song by Harry Warren and Mack Gordon

Song
- Published: 1945 by Bregman, Vocco and Conn
- Songwriter: Mack Gordon
- Composer: Harry Warren

"The More I See You" is a pop song composed by Harry Warren, with lyrics by Mack Gordon. The song was first published in 1945.

The song was introduced by Dick Haymes in the 1945 film Diamond Horseshoe, and also played as an overture under the opening credits and incidental music throughout.

== Other recordings ==
"The More I See You" has been subsequently recorded by many artists, notably by:

- Chet Baker sings the song on his 1958 LP (Chet Baker Sings) It Could Happen to You.
- Bobby Darin on his 1961 album Love Swings.
- Chris Montez released the most commercially successful and well-known recording of the song in 1966. His version went to number sixteen on the Billboard Hot 100 and spent four weeks at number two on the Easy Listening chart. It also went to number three on the UK Singles Chart.
- Nancy Sinatra recorded a version of the song on her 1966 album Nancy in London.
- Ella Fitzgerald recorded a live version in 1967, accompanied by the Jimmy Jones Trio, which was released on Ella and Duke at the Cote D'Azur.
- Andy Williams recorded a version of the song on his 1967 album: Love, Andy.
- Peter Allen recorded a version of the song on his 1976 album Taught by Experts.
- Bing Crosby recorded a version of the song on his 1977 album Beautiful Memories.
- Orchestral Manoeuvres in the Dark included the song on their 1980 album Organisation.
- Nina Simone included the song on her 1993 album A Single Woman.
