= Adrienne Anderson =

American songwriter

Adrienne Anderson is an American songwriter, most notable for being the co-writer of "Could It Be Magic", among other Barry Manilow songs, as well as being the co-writer of signature songs for Dionne Warwick ("Déjà Vu") and Peter Allen ("I Go to Rio").

== History ==
Adrienne Anderson (maiden name Arzt, married Neal Anderson) has had a continuing association with Barry Manilow that goes back to his first album, released in July, 1973, and which featured their co-written "Could It Be Magic".

== Collaboration ==
In late 1970 or very early 1971, Barry Manilow recorded Anderson's composition of "Amy". This was issued as Bell single 971 in February, 1971 as by Featherbed featuring Barry Manilow. This was the very first release of any kind for Manilow.

Anderson and Manilow have co-written approximately thirty songs that have been recorded. Two of their best-known collaborations are "Could It Be Magic" and "Daybreak". When Manilow was inducted into the Songwriters Hall of Fame in 2002, he made a point of attending with and crediting his co-writers, including Anderson. In 2010, Anderson was an invited guest at the premiere of Manilow's two-year engagement at the Paris Las Vegas.

Stemming from her association with Manilow, Anderson commenced writing with Melissa Manchester. Manilow had been playing piano at the Continental Baths in New York, and had befriended Bette Midler, who sang there. With Manilow's encouragement, Manchester became one of three Harlettes, Midler's backup singers. Manchester's recording career, which commenced in 1973, one year after the release of Manilow's first album and on the same label as Manilow (Arista), was significantly based on these early associations. Anderson started co-writing with Manchester with the release of Manchester's second album, Bright Eyes (1974). Anderson co-wrote three songs with Manchester: the title track, "Alone", and "No. 1 (Ahwant Gemmeh)". Anderson's contributions were described as being closer to Manchester's sensibilities than her previous co-writer, Carole Bayer Sager.

Anderson's collaboration with Peter Allen commenced in the mid-1970s, resulting in one of Allen's most-recognized songs, "I Go to Rio", which was first released in 1976. She also co-wrote "Love Crazy" with Allen, which was the opening track on Allen's 1977 live album, It Is Time for Peter Allen. She later co-write "Angels With Dirty Faces" with Allen, included on his 1979 album, I Could Have Been a Sailor.

In 1979, Anderson co-wrote "Déjà Vu" with Isaac Hayes, which was recorded by Dionne Warwick. The song, included on Warwick's first album for Arista Records, Dionne, was important to the revitalization of Warwick's career at that point. Warwick's rendition of the song won her the 1980 Grammy Award for Best Female R&B Vocal Performance.

Recent collaborations have included co-writing with noted songwriter, arranger and producer Leon Ware. Anderson co-wrote "Warm Inside" on Ware's album A Kiss in the Sand (2005). Anderson also wrote the libretto for City Kid: The Musical, which premiered at Village Theatre in Issaquah, Washington, and subsequently opened in Los Angeles in 2007.
