= I Go to Rio =

1976 single by Peter Allen

Single by Peter Allen

from the album Taught by Experts
- B-side: "This Time Around"
- Released: 1976
- Recorded: 1976
- Genre: Pop; disco
- Length: 3:17
- Label: A&M
- Songwriters: Peter Allen; Adrienne Anderson
- Producer: Brooks Arthur

Peter Allen singles chronology
"I Go to Rio" (1976)	"Don't Wish Too Hard" (1977)

"I Go to Rio" is a song written by Peter Allen and Adrienne Anderson, and performed by Allen. It became a signature song of Allen, as well as being covered by Peggy Lee and Pablo Cruise, among others, as well as being included in a number of soundtracks.

== History ==
The song was first released in 1976, on Peter Allen's fourth studio album, Taught by Experts. In 1977, it was successfully released as a single in Australia, where it was Number 1 for five weeks.

Although the song was also released as a single in America, it failed to chart there.

The song has appeared in a number of movie soundtracks, including One Crazy Summer (1986), Dominick and Eugene (1988), The Fabulous Baker Boys (1989), Muriel's Wedding (1994), Hotel Sorrento (1995) and Strange Bedfellows (2004).

The song is also used as the closing number for the rewritten Broadway version of the Peter Allen biographical musical The Boy from Oz.

The song is also sung on the Disney channel series K.C. Undercover, specifically the episode "Coopers on the Run"

== Charts ==
=== Weekly charts ===
Chart (1976/1977)	Peak position
Australia (Kent Music Report)	1
Belgium (Ultratop 50 Flanders)	30
Netherlands (Dutch Top 40)	27
New Zealand (Recorded Music NZ)	22
Chart (1978)	Peak position
South Africa (SA Rock Lists)	8

=== Year-end charts ===
Chart (1977)	Peak position
Australia (Kent Music Report)	6

== Pablo Cruise cover ==
"I Go to Rio"

Single by Pablo Cruise

from the album Worlds Away
- B-side: "Raging Fire"
- Released: January 1979
- Genre: Pop; funk
- Length: 3:59 (album version); 3:36 (single version); 4:17 (disco version)
- Label: A&M
- Songwriters: Peter Allen; Adrienne Anderson
- Producer: Bill Schnee

Pablo Cruise singles chronology
"Don't Want to Live Without It" (1978)	"I Go to Rio" (1979)	"I Want You Tonight" (1979)

Pablo Cruise released their cover of "I Go to Rio" in January 1979. It reached #46 on the U.S. Billboard Hot 100 and #39 on the Canadian RPM singles chart.

=== Charts ===
Chart (1979)	Peak position
Canada Top Singles (RPM)	39
US Billboard Hot 100	46
US Billboard Adult Contemporary	29

== Other covers ==
The song was also covered by Peggy Lee on her 1977 album Peggy, as well as by noted French singer Claude François, in French translation ("Je vais à Rio"), that same year. In 1980, it was used on an episode of The Muppet Show. In 1982, it was covered by TISM under the name "I Go to Werribee" with slightly different lyrics. In 2008, the song was covered by Australian guitarist Tommy Emmanuel, on his live album Center Stage.

The melody of the opening piano riff of the song has been re-used by Chocolate in "Ritmo de la noche" and subsequent cover versions Mystic, The Sacados, Lorca and Safri Duo, and by Coldplay in "Every Teardrop Is a Waterfall".
