= I Honestly Love You =

1974 single by Olivia Newton-John

- One of side-A labels of the Australian single

Single by Olivia Newton-John

from the album Long Live Love (UK) and If You Love Me, Let Me Know (US)
- B-side: "Home Ain't Home Anymore"
- Released: August 1974 (US)
- Recorded: 1974
- Genre: Soft rock; pop; country
- Length: 3:40
- Label: EMI
- Songwriters: Jeff Barry; Peter Allen
- Producer: John Farrar

Olivia Newton-John singles chronology
"If You Love Me, Let Me Know" (1974)	"I Honestly Love You" (1974)	"Have You Never Been Mellow" (1975)

Audio
- "I Honestly Love You" (1974) on YouTube

Alternative release
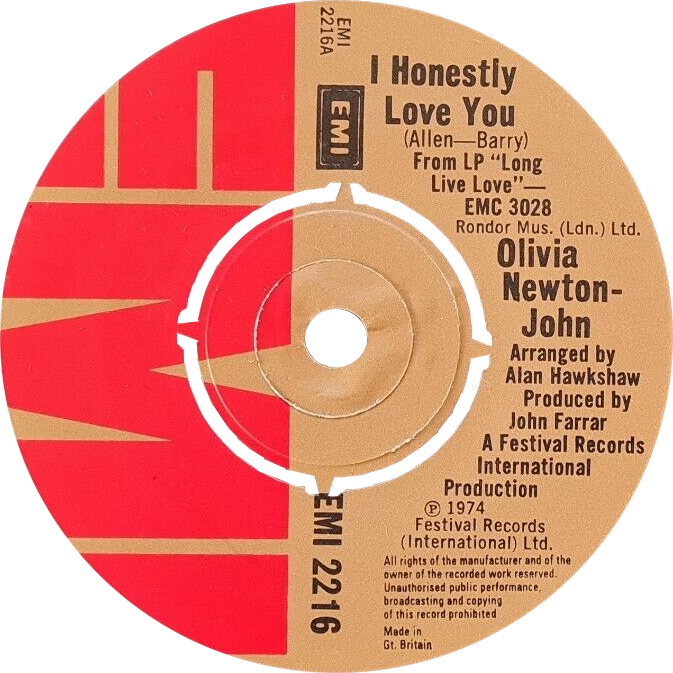
- Side A of the UK single

"I Honestly Love You" is a song recorded by Olivia Newton-John and released in 1974 on the album Long Live Love in the United Kingdom and If You Love Me, Let Me Know in the United States. The song became a worldwide pop hit, her first number-one single in the United States and Canada. The single was first released in Australia as "I Love You, I Honestly Love You", as per its chorus. The song was written by Jeff Barry and Australian singer and composer Peter Allen. The latter recorded it around the same time for his album Continental American.

At the 17th Grammy Awards in 1975, the single won both Record of the Year and Best Pop Vocal Performance, Female. The composition was nominated for Song of the Year but lost to "The Way We Were". British arranger, keyboardist and composer Alan Hawkshaw received the award for Best Arrangement from the American Academy of Arts & Sciences for "I Honestly Love You". He also played on the recording.

In June 2007, VH1 ranked Newton-John's recording at no. 11 in its 40 Most Softsational Soft-Rock Songs list.

== In popular culture ==
A snippet of Lynn Anderson's recording of the song plays over Chief Brody's radio in the second shark attack in Steven Spielberg's 1975 film Jaws, moments before Alex Kitner and Pippet the dog disappear beneath the waves.

It also appears in the musical about Peter Allen's life, The Boy from Oz.

== Reception ==
Record World said that it has "delicate, lush production" and commented on "its pure emotive qualities."

== Chart performance ==
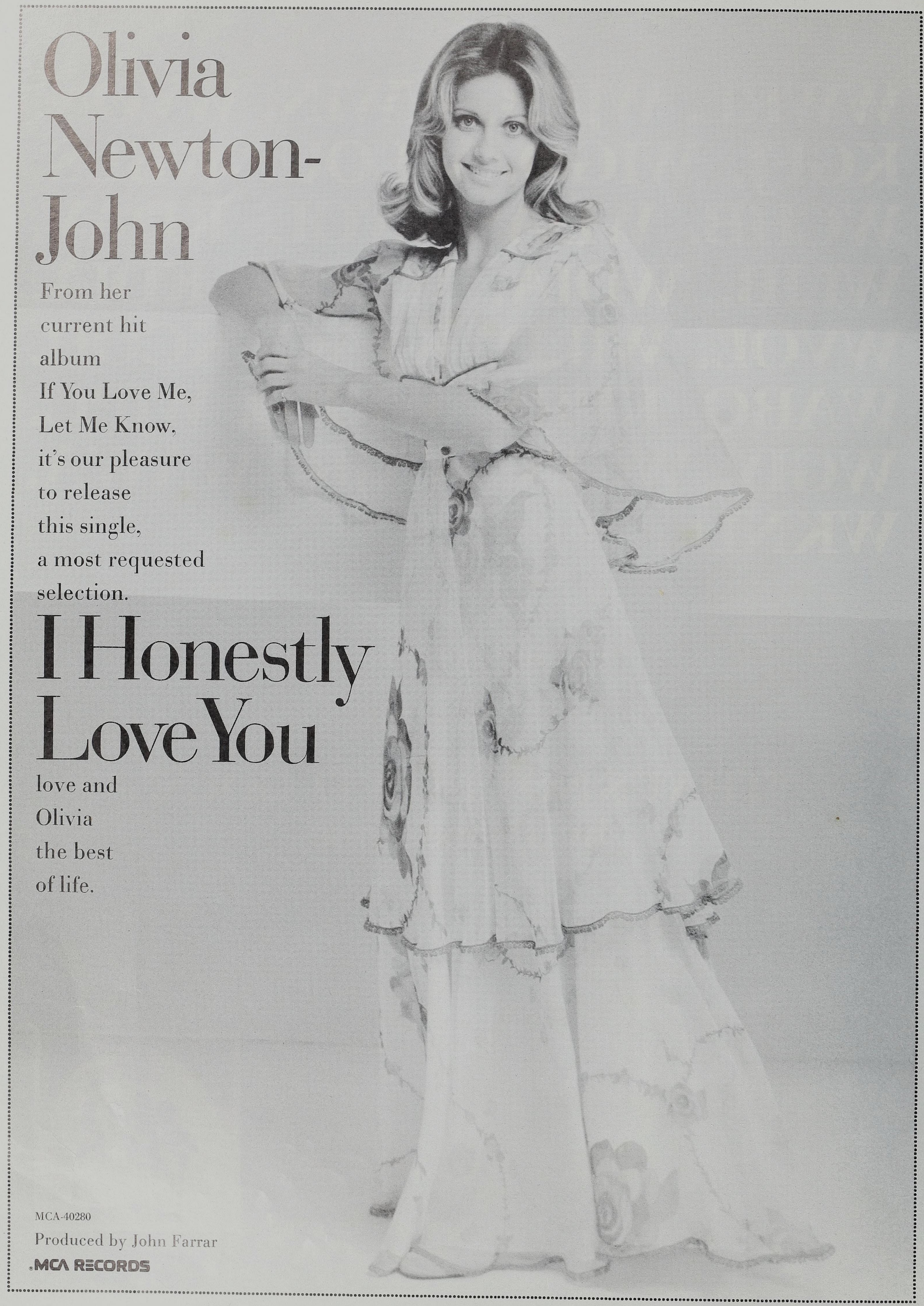
Cashbox advertisement, August 10, 1974

The single reached #1 in Australia, as well as the top three of the Billboard Hot 100 in an unusually fast six weeks, and in its eighth week, the chart dated 5 October 1974, it spent the first of its two weeks at number one. Soon after it was certified gold by the Recording Industry Association of America, having sold one million copies. It also reached number one (three weeks) on the Adult Contemporary chart and no. 6 on the Country chart. The song's success also helped propel its parent album, If You Love Me, Let Me Know, to number one, on the chart dated 12 October 1974. By contrast, the single failed to reach the top 20 in the United Kingdom (no. 22), although it did chart there in 1983 when it was re-released to promote a Newton-John greatest hits album.

The single ranked number 97 on Billboard's Year-End Top 100 of 1974 – a ranking based on only 11 of its 15 weeks on the Hot 100.

In November 1977, a re-release of Newton-John's original version backed with "Don't Cry for Me Argentina", from her then-current album Making a Good Thing Better, reached number 48 during its nine-week run on the Hot 100; the single outperformed the only A-side single from the album (the title track), which five months earlier had stalled at number 87. The re-release of Newton-John's 1974 hit also re-charted on the Adult Contemporary chart, peaking at number 49.

=== Charts ===
==== Weekly charts ====
Chart (1974)	Peak position
Australia (Kent Music Report)	1
Canada Top Singles (RPM)	1
Canada Adult Contemporary (RPM)	1
Canada Country Singles (RPM)	1
Quebec (ADISQ)	12
South Africa (Springbok)	5
Sweden (Sverigetopplistan)	1
UK Singles (Official Charts)	22
US Billboard Hot 100	1
US Adult Contemporary (Billboard)	1
US Hot Country Songs (Billboard)	6
US Cash Box Top 100	1

Chart (1977–1978)	Peak position
Canada Top Singles (RPM)	50
Canada Adult Contemporary Tracks (RPM)	1
US Billboard Hot 100	48
US Adult Contemporary (Billboard)	49
US Cash Box Top 100	60

Chart (1983)	Peak position
UK Singles (Official Charts Company)	52

Chart (2022)	Peak position
US Digital Song Sales (Billboard)	39

==== Year-end charts ====
Chart (1974)	Rank
Australia (Kent Music Report)	10
Canada (RPM)	15
US Billboard Hot 100	97
US Cash Box Top 100	62

== 1998 version ==
"I Honestly Love You '98"

Single by Olivia Newton-John

from the album Back with a Heart
- Released: 1998
- Recorded: 1998
- Genre: Pop, adult contemporary
- Length: 4:04
- Label: MCA
- Songwriters: Jeff Barry, Peter Allen
- Producer: David Foster

Olivia Newton-John singles chronology
"You're the One That I Want" (1998)	"I Honestly Love You '98" (1998)	"Back with a Heart" (1998)

Music video
- "I Honestly Love You '98" on YouTube

Newton-John re-recorded "I Honestly Love You" for her 1998 album Back with a Heart, with Babyface on background vocals. The new version was released as a single, debuting on the Billboard Hot 100 in May 1998. It was her first song to chart in the Hot 100 for six years, peaking at No. 67 and spent 12 weeks on the chart. It reached No. 18 on the Adult Contemporary chart and No. 16 on the Country Music Sales chart.

=== Charts ===
Chart (1998)	Peak position
Australia (ARIA)	88
US Billboard Hot 100	67
US Adult Contemporary (Billboard)	18
US Country Singles Sales (Billboard)	16

== Cover versions ==
- Bobby Vinton on his 1974 album Melodies of Love
- Andy Williams on his 1974 album You Lay So Easy on My Mind
- Lynn Anderson on her 1974 album What a Man My Man Is
- Ronnie Milsap on his 1975 album A Legend in My Time
- Kamahl on his 1975 album Let It Be Me
- Jerry Butler on his 1976 album Love's on the Menu
- Leslie Uggams on the 1977 TV special Sinatra and Friends
- The Staple Singers on their 1977 album Family Tree
- Bobby Womack on his 1979 album Roads of Life
- Jackie Moore on her 1980 album With Your Love
- Donna Fargo on her 1984 album Encore
- Lea Salonga on her 1993 self titled album
- Richard Clayderman on his 1999 album My Australian Collection
- Leslie Cheung on his 2000 EP Untitled
- Juliana Hatfield on her 2018 album Juliana Hatfield Sings Olivia Newton-John.
- Delta Goodrem in the 2018 mini-series Olivia Newton-John: Hopelessly Devoted to You and the accompanying soundtrack album, I Honestly Love You
- Kate Ceberano on her 2021 album Sweet Inspiration
