= Kangaroo Island (film) =

2024 Australian film by Timothy David

- Official theatrical poster
- Directed by: Timothy David
- Written by: Sally Gifford
- Produced by: Timothy David; Peter Hanlon; Bettina Hamilton; Daniel M. Rosenberg; Leona Cichon
- Starring: Rebecca Breeds; Adelaide Clemens; Erik Thomson; Joel Jackson; Nicholas Hope
- Cinematography: Ian McCarroll
- Edited by: Jamie Rusiti
- Music by: Ariel Marx
- Production companies: Pouch Potato, Piro
- Distributed by: Maslow Entertainment (Australia & NZ); Blue Harbor Entertainment (US)
- Release dates: 3 November 2024 (Adelaide Film Festival); 21 August 2025 (Australia)
- Running time: 110 minutes
- Country: Australia
- Box office: $536,000

Kangaroo Island is a 2024 Australian drama–comedy film directed by Timothy David and written by Sally Gifford. The film is set on and was filmed on Kangaroo Island in South Australia. After its world premiere at the Adelaide Film Festival on 3 November 2024, the film was released in Australian cinemas on 21 August 2025. The film was released on Netflix in Australia and New Zealand in January 2026, and in US theatres on 24 April 2026.

It received four nominations at the 2026 Film Critics Circle of Australia Awards, including Best Picture, and won two international awards. Critics' reviews varied widely, with most awarding 3 stars out of 5.

== Synopsis ==
Estranged daughter Lou, an actress whose career has not taken off in Hollywood, returns to her hometown on Kangaroo island, upon request by her father, who announces he is terminally ill. Lou and her sister Freya, who is religious, have a complicated past relationship, made worse when it is revealed that Freya has been given ownership of the family farm by her father. She has arranged an 80 year lease of the property to a Christian organization, without consulting her father or sister. They try to repair their differences and make peace for the sake of their father.

== Cast ==
- Rebecca Breeds as Lou Wells
- Adelaide Clemens as Freya Wells
- Erik Thomson as Rory Wells
- Joel Jackson as Ben Roberts
- Nicholas Hope as Barnaby Roberts

== Production ==
Kangaroo Island is the debut feature film of Timothy David, also known as Tim Piper. He is best known for being co-founder and co-owner of the New York-based production company Piro, and being the creator of Dove's 2008 "Evolution" ad and the four-part webseries for Chipotle Mexican Grill about "Big Ag", called Farmed and Dangerous Kangaroo Island is also the debut film for actress-turned-filmmaker Sally Gifford, who is Piper's wife. The couple have been based in New York for 20 years, but in 2016 bought a holiday house on Kangaroo Island.

The film was originally titled Animal, referring to the observation of the characters as human animals. There is tragedy in the film, but also comedy, and it shows characters who are dealing with hardship.

Filming took place on Kangaroo Island, including at Snelling Beach, Emu Bay, Stokes Bay, and Vivonne Bay. It includes shots of some of its wildlife, including echidnas, kangaroos, koalas, goannas, great white sharks, seals, and dolphins.

It was produced by Timothy David, Peter Hanlon, (Note: Former chair of the South Australian Film Corporation; as of 2024 co-chairs the Mercury Cinema.) Bettina Hamilton, Daniel M. Rosenberg, and Leona Cichon, with Pouch Potato Productions Pty Ltd. Ian McCarroll is cinematographer and music is by Ariel Marx. David Ockenden was production designer. It runs for 110 minutes.

The film was partially funded by the Adelaide Film Festival Investment Fund and the South Australian Film Corporation.

== Release ==
The film's world premiere was on the closing night of the 2024 Adelaide Film Festival, on 3 November 2024. It was screened at the Brisbane International Film Festival at HOTA on the Gold Coast in May 2025.

The trailer for Kangaroo Island was released on 18 June 2025, and the film was released in cinemas on 21 August 2025. Distribution in Australia and New Zealand is by Sydney-based Maslow Entertainment. Screening on Netflix in Australia and New Zealand commenced on 16 January 2026, and it reached third place in the most popular films on the platform in Australia in the week ending 18 January.

Blue Harbor Entertainment acquired US distribution rights to the film, with a theatrical release on 24 April 2026.

== Reception ==
=== Box office and audiences ===
The film grossed AUD$536,000.

=== Critical reception ===
Kangaroo Island received generally positive reviews, with critics praising its performances, cinematography, emotional storytelling, and use of the island's landscape. Several publications described the film as an ambitious and moving Australian drama, highlighting its exploration of grief, family relationships, and resilience. Reviewers also noted the significance of Kangaroo Island's natural environment within the story, with the setting contributing to the film's emotional themes and atmosphere.

Australian Arts Review described Kangaroo Island as "the best Australian film in years".

Rachael Mead of InDaily called the film a "stunning piece of cinema", and praised the actors' "world-class performances" – especially Rebecca Breeds. Mead said that the "universal themes of grief and the power of family to both harm and heal... played out on Kangaroo Island's rugged locations beautifully connect this isolated place to the rest of the world."

Sandra Hall of The Sydney Morning Herald gave it 3.5 out of 5 stars, praising the ending: "David succeeds in turning on an impressively poignant finale".

James Murphy of The Scoop writes: "Kangaroo Island entertains, provokes, and unsettles in equal measure. It’s an ambitious work that dares to ask the oldest questions in the newest light. It leaves you with the uneasy realisation that the tides of fate, however luminous, carry everyone out to sea."

Other reviews were less positive. Luke Buckmaster, writing for The Guardian, awarded it 3 stars out of 5, calling it "tonally uneven".

Director Timothy David vehemently defended the film and dismissed criticism, attributing it to "local film industry fringe dwellers" whom he accused of having "deliberately trolled the film".

== Accolades ==
The film won Best Australian Director at the London Director Awards and Best Debut Feature at the 2025 Montreal Independent Film Festival.

It received four nominations at the 2026 Film Critics Circle of Australia Awards: Best Picture, Best Lead Actress (Rebecca Breeds); Best Supporting Actress (Adelaide Clemens), and Best Score (Ariel Marx).
