= Bettina Hamilton =

Australian film producer

- Occupation: Film producer
- Years active: 2006–present
- Known for: Embrace (2016); Monolith (2022); Kangaroo Island (2025)

Bettina Hamilton is an Australian film producer based in Adelaide, South Australia. She is known for her work on several successful Australian films, including the documentary feature Embrace (2016), and feature fiction films Monolith (2022) and Kangaroo Island (2025). She has also been line producer on several TV series, including the comedy series Aftertaste (2021–2022) and the 2026 crime series Treasure & Dirt.

== Early life and education ==
Bettina Hamilton grew up in South Australia.

== Career ==
Hamilton began working in various roles in film production (including production manager, coordinator, and accountant) around 2006. In 2010, with writer/director Dave Wade, she produced the short film Cropped, which was nominated for Best Short Film at the 2011 Sydney Film Festival as well as being nominated at the inaugural AACTA Awards, for Best Short Fiction Film. In 2011, she produced the 7-minute short film A Tortured Mind for the 2012 Tropfest short film festival. It was partly funded by the Media Resource Centre and the South Australian Film Corporation (one of three South Australian films selected for the Tropfest initiative), with some funds raised via crowdfunding platform Pozible.

Hamilton co-produced the 2016 documentary film Embrace, along with writer and director Taryn Brumfitt and others. She was line producer on the ABC and Closer Productions' comedy series Aftertaste, as well as the Fox drama series The Twelve. She was production manager for the acclaimed teenage drama series The Hunting (2019) on SBS, the 2020 ABC Me children's documentary series Are You Tougher Than Your Ancestors?, and the 2022 feature film Gold (2021). She also co-produced the documentary feature about Australian rock band The Angels directed by Madeleine Parry, called The Angels: Kickin' Down the Door (2022), with Peter Hanlon and others. The film premiered at the 2022 Adelaide Film Festival and was released in Australian cinemas on 1 December 2022.

Hamilton's first feature film as producer was Monolith, after being selected for development through SAFC's inaugural "Film Lab: New Voices" initiative in 2020. The film, directed by Matt Vesely and written by Lucy Campbell, premiered at the 2022 Adelaide Film Festival, was selected for screening at SXSW in Austin, Texas, in 2023, and had a theatrical release in Australian cinemas as well as in North America. It was Hamilton who thought of the idea central to the film, that the central (and only on-screen) actor should be a podcaster. Monolith was nominated for Best Indie Film at the 2024 AACTA Awards.

She co-produced the family drama Kangaroo Island with Peter Hanlon. The film, written by Sally Gifford and directed by Timothy David, premiered at the 2024 Adelaide Film Festival, and was released in Australia in 2025 and in the US in 2026.

Hamilton is line producer on a crime series made and filmed in South Australia, Treasure & Dirt, based on the novel by Chris Hammer and starring Michael Dorman and Liv Hewson. The series, which is produced by Rebecca Summerton of Closer Productions and directed by Madeleine Gottlieb, is scheduled for release on 19 July 2026.

=== Production company ===
Hamilton's production company is Black Cat White Rabbit Productions.

== Other activities ==
In April 2025 Hamilton facilitated an intensive one-day course dubbed the "Launch Lab" at the Mercury Cinema in Adelaide. Aimed at young or emerging producers, the course was focused on skills needed "to navigate the day-to-day world of a busy production office". In June 2026, she ran another Launch Lab at The Mercury, this time on budgeting.

Hamilton was the instigator of the Hamilton Health & Safety Fund, an initiative to improve the standards of health and well-being in the production of South Australian short films. The fund was launched at the Mercury in July 2025, initially funded for three years by Black Cat White Rabbit Productions, the Hanlon Larsen Screen Fellowship, and private funding. Short films are usually created by emerging filmmakers, and this cohort is the intended target of the fund.
