= Timothy David =

Timothy David may refer to:

- Tim David (born 1996), Singaporean/Australian cricketer
- Timothy David (director), Australian film director also known as Tim Piper
