= Qbit =

Qbit may refer to:

- Quettabit, the symbol for the decimal unit of information storage
- qBittorrent
- Qubit, a quantum bit, or qubit (sometimes qbit) is a unit of quantum information
- Cubit, an ancient measure of length
- Q-Bit (born 1978), alias of American electronic musician Benn Jordan
