= Onslaught (Dove) =

Online advertising campaign by Unilever

- Agency: Ogilvy & Mather (Toronto)
- Client: Unilever
- Language: English
- Running time: 74 seconds
- Product: Dove Self-Esteem Fund
- Release date: October 1, 2007
- Directed by: Tim Piper
- Music by: Simian ("La Breeze")
- Production company: Worldwide Productions; Steam
- Produced by: Brenda Surminski; Jeff McDougall
- Country: Canada
- Preceded by: Evolution
- Followed by: Amy
- Official website: http://www.campaignforrealbeauty.ca/

Onslaught is an online advertising campaign created by Unilever in 2007 to promote the Dove Self-Esteem Fund. It is the third such piece to be released, following Daughters and Evolution. As with the previous spots, the 80-second spot was managed by advertising agency Ogilvy & Mather and was directed by Tim Piper. The campaign won a number of prestigious awards from within the advertising industry, including at the Cannes Lions International Advertising Festival.

The film begins opening titles along with the song "La Breeze", by the now-defunct English band Simian. It then dissolves to the face of a young girl. The song keeps building, repeating the lyrics "Here it comes... Here it comes..." The music takes off and the little girl is quickly followed by a bombardment of fictionalized images, video clips, product shots and advertisements, all illustrating of the impossible standards of beauty in modern media. The film ends with a shot of the same girl walking to school with her classmates, and the text "talk to your daughter before the beauty industry does" appears on the screen. The viewer is then invited to the Campaign for Real Beauty's website.

== Takes ==
In 2008 Greenpeace made a spoof based on the piece titled "Dove Onslaught(er)". Greenpeace was criticizing Unilever for using palm oil in its products because of the environmental impacts from palm oil plantations. The video was a part of a campaign against Dove. As of December 2013 the parody has over 2 million total views.

== See also ==
- Dove Real Beauty Sketches
