= AWFC =

The abbreviation AWFC can refer to one of the following:

- Airport West Football Club
- Alliance for Women Film Composers
- American West Football Conference
- Armthorpe Welfare F.C.
- Arsenal W.F.C.
- Askern Welfare F.C. a.k.a. Askern Villa
