= Flashbulb =

Flashbulb may refer to:

- Flashbulb (photography), lightbulb used in flash photography
- Flashbulb memory, a vivid memory of an event
- The Flashbulb, a pseudonym of musician Benn Jordan
