= Dove Real Beauty Sketches =

- A typical sketch from Dove Real Beauty Sketches
- Directed by: John X. Carey
- Produced by: Jamie Miller; Claude Letessier
- Music by: Keith Kenniff
- Production companies: Unilever \ Dove; Ogilvy & Mather (Brazil)
- Release date: April 14, 2013
- Running time: 6 minutes
- Language: English

Dove Real Beauty Sketches is a short film produced in 2013 as part of the Dove Campaign for Real Beauty marketing campaign. The aim of the film is to show women that they are more beautiful than they think they are by comparing self-descriptions to those of strangers.

In the video, which was produced by the Ogilvy & Mather ad agency, several women describe themselves to a forensic sketch artist who cannot see his subjects. The same women are then described by strangers whom they met the previous day. The sketches are compared, with the stranger's image invariably being both more flattering and more accurate. The differences create strong reactions when shown to the women.

The film created a sensation upon its online release in April 2013, quickly going viral. More than 15 million people downloaded the video within a week of its release. Media reaction to the video was mixed. The Daily Telegraph called it "[Dove's] most thought provoking film yet", while Forbes said it was "powerful", but their reviewer felt that "it’s still focusing too much on appearance."

== Background ==
Inspired by market research that suggested only 4% of women describe themselves as beautiful (up from 2% in 2004), and around 54% believe that when it comes to how they look, they are their own worst beauty critic, Unilever's Dove brand has been conducting a marketing campaign called Dove Campaign for Real Beauty that aims to celebrate women's natural beauty since 2005. According to Anselmo Ramos, creative director of Ogilvy & Mather, and head of the Real Beauty Sketches project, the goal of the Real Beauty Campaign is to find a way to convince the other 96% they are also beautiful.

Several ideas to achieve this aim were suggested, and it was decided that an unscripted experiment would be the best way to reach women. The idea of hiring a forensic sketch artist stood out, but Ramos was not sure it would work. "With Real Beauty Sketches, we thought that women would probably describe themselves in a more negative way than strangers. But it was just a guess really .... It could go totally wrong." Dove agreed and Ogilvy & Mather hired FBI-trained sketch artist Gil Zamora after "extensive research" because of his experience (3,000+ criminal sketches) and intimate style. According to Ramos, Zamora was "really excited about the project" and was crucial to its success. Ogilvy & Mather selected two groups of women - those being sketched and those providing a second description of them - from diverse backgrounds through a normal casting process. John X. Carey from Paranoid US was chosen to direct. A three-minute long video was launched in four key markets, U.S., Canada, Brazil and Australia, and was then produced and uploaded in 25 languages to 46 Dove YouTube channels across remaining countries. The video was launched using TrueView in-stream, TrueView in-search, YouTube homepage masthead, and search ads globally. Audience participation via YouTube brand channels, YouTube video responses, Google+ Hangouts, and a Google+ page was encouraged.

== Description ==
The selected women were asked to come to a loft in San Francisco, but were not told why. After meeting each other, the women were taken one at a time into a room where Gil Zamora asked the women to describe themselves from behind a curtain. The women were told to use neutral terms and stick to the facts in their descriptions. Zamora sketched each woman based only on her self-description. The next day the same woman was described by a stranger whom they had met in the loft. The two sketches were then shown to the subjects. The whole thing was recorded and the results were turned into a six-minute film entitled Dove Real Beauty Sketches. A shorter three-minute version was also released.

In the films, each of the women describe themselves in a predominately negative way. For example, they use phrases such as "rounder face," "protruding jaw," and "big forehead." In contrast, the strangers use more positive language to describe the same person. In all cases the second sketch is more flattering, and more accurate, than the first. The dramatic differences in the sketches cause tears and other strong reactions when each woman is shown her two portraits. "We spend a lot of time as women analyzing and trying to fix the things that aren't quite right, and we should spend more times appreciating the things we do like," explains one participant. "Do you think you're more beautiful than you say?" Zamora asks another woman. "Yes," she admits. The film ends by stating "You are more beautiful than you think" and then shows the Dove logo.

== Reaction ==
The films were released on April 14, 2013 and quickly generated a strong reaction, going viral within days. By April 18, the 3-minute version had been downloaded 7.5 million times, while the 6-minute version had been viewed more than 900,000 times. By April 21, the videos had more than 15 million views between them. On Mashable, an article about the campaign was shared more than 500,000 times in 24 hours. The video was among BuzzFeed's top 10 items on April 18. According to AdAge, the campaign generated just under 30 million views and 660,000 Facebook shares during its first ten days. Those numbers allowed the video to more than double up on its nearest competition in the publication's week survey of viral video advertisement interest. As of April 27, 2013, the 3-minute video had been viewed 30.6 million times; user feedback on YouTube was 97.6% positive (98,000 likes and 2,200 dislikes). By June 2013, the video received 163 million global views, topped Cannes YouTube Ads leader board and won the Titanium Grand Prix at the Cannes Lions International Festival of Creativity. Overall it achieved 4.6 billion media impressions and 275,000 followers on Google+. Over 15 video parodies of the ad have been created so far. The campaign garnered over 4.6 billion Public Relations and blogger media impressions by June 2013.

Mainstream media quickly took notice, with mixed reaction. Writing for The Daily Telegraph, Katy Young called Real Beauty Sketches "[Dove's] most thought provoking film yet ... Moving, eye opening and in some ways saddening, this is one campaign that will make you think, and hopefully, feel more beautiful." Adweek analyst Rebecca Cullers called the video "one of the most original and touching experiments" to come from Dove in a long time. In a Huffington Post article, Emma Gray remarks "despite the obvious commercial intentions behind this campaign, the message rings true and is a refreshing departure from the many female-targeted ads that try to shame women into buying things."

Avi Dan of Forbes said the video presents "an extraordinary, powerful image", but added "ironically it implies, if not actually stated, that beauty is still what defines women. The video pretends to debunk the notion that how you look always seems to be more important than who you are. But I feel like it’s still focusing too much on appearance." Additional, Dan was bothered that all of the women in the video are young and thin, and most are white. In a Psychology Today article, Kate Fridkis said she liked the concept of the film but "something felt a little off." "In Dove’s world, as in the real world of beauty standards, there is definitely a better and a worse way to look," she remarked "it’s just that, according to Dove, women are often mistaken about which side they’re really on." Writing for Bloomberg, Virginia Postrel noted that the "experiment" was not scientifically valid - the participants were not randomly selected, the sketch artist deviated from normal procedure (he didn't show the women the sketches and ask them to confirm they were accurate at the time of the drawings), and the video editors chose only seven out of about 20 women used. She quoted forensic sketch artist Stephen Mancusi, who said, "it’s a tainted image, there’s no question about it.” In the blogosphere, the video drew harsher criticism prompting Adweek to write an article entitled "5 Reasons Why Some Critics Are Hating on Dove's Real Beauty Sketches Video".

In response to the criticism, Will Burns of Forbes wrote a column countering the criticisms. He argued that critics were being selective in what they observed: of the seven women in the video, three were minorities; they ignored descriptors like "nice eyes that lit up when she spoke" instead focusing only comments that mentioned youth or weight; and they took comments out of context. He states that the "Sketches idea is so altruistic in its intent that it’s technically counter to [Dove's] own sales mission ... it tells women] they don’t need as much Dove as they think." He concludes "If you want to hammer a brand, hammer the cosmetic companies who overtly say you’ll be more beautiful with their products. But don’t hammer Dove."

Brenda Fiala of Blast Radius, a digital advertising agency, said the Sketches campaign was successful because it taps into deep-seated emotions and "hits on a real human truth for women. Many women undervalue themselves and also the way they look." Ramos agreed: "Most ads today don’t evoke any clear emotion, they just communicate a particular product or service benefit. We wanted to do something really emotional ... We knew we had something good in our hands." Adweek remarked "like all of the best work, the commercial elements are barely there. Beyond the logo, Dove doesn't even attempt to sell soap." Fiala predicted that consumers would remember the positive emotions the video caused and associate them with Dove products.

A male parody video also went viral, collecting more than a million views in less than a week. The Onion's Clickhole parodied the video, and other inspiring viral ad campaign videos, in January 2015.

== See also ==
- Evolution (advertisement)
- Onslaught (Dove)
