= Deadline Gallipoli =

2015 Australian television mini-series

- DVD cover
- Genre: Period drama
- Written by: Stuart Beattie; Shaun Grant; Jacquelin Perske; Cate Shortland
- Directed by: Michael Rymer
- Starring: Sam Worthington; Hugh Dancy; Joel Jackson
- Theme music composer: David Bridie
- Country of origin: Australia
- Original language: English
- No. of series: 1
- No. of episodes: 2

Production
- Executive producers: Michael Schwarz; Michael McMahon; Luca Scalisi; Penny Win; Sam Worthington
- Producers: John Schwarz; Penny Chapman; Jacquelin Perske
- Production location: South Australia
- Cinematography: Geoffrey Hall
- Editor: Dany Cooper
- Running time: 197 minutes
- Production companies: Matchbox Pictures; Full Clip Productions

Original release
- Network: showcase Foxtel
- Release: 19 April 2015

Deadline Gallipoli is an Australian television drama mini-series, first screened on Foxtel's Showcase channel on 19 and 20 April 2015. The two-part series explores the Gallipoli Campaign from the point of view of war correspondents Ellis Ashmead-Bartlett, Charles Bean, Keith Murdoch, and Phillip Schuler. The show was produced by the Australian producer John Schwarz.

== Cast ==
- Joel Jackson as Charles Bean
- Sam Worthington as Phillip Schuler
- Hugh Dancy as Ellis Ashmead-Bartlett
- Ewen Leslie as Keith Murdoch
- Charles Dance as General Hamilton
- Rachel Griffiths as Lady Hamilton
- Anna Torv as Lady Gwendoline Churchill
- Jessica De Gouw as Vera Grant
- James Fraser as Bazley
- Laurence Boxhall as Jimmy Paradise
- Luke Ford as Charlie Hodson
- Bryan Brown as General Bridges
- Daniel Wyllie as Captain Frank Elliot
- John Bell as Lord Kitchener
- Huw Higginson as General Birdwood
- Robert Rabiah as Mehmet
- Nick Pelomis as Michaelis
- Justin Smith as Lester Lawrence
- Simon Lyndon as Conrad White

== Accolades ==
Award	Category	Subject	Result
AACTA Awards (5th)	Best Direction in Television	Michael Rymer	Nominated
AACTA Awards (5th)	Best Lead Actor in a Television Drama	Joel Jackson	Nominated
AACTA Awards (5th)	Best Screenplay in Television	Shaun Grant	Nominated
AACTA Awards (5th)	Best Screenplay in Television	Jacquelin Perske	Nominated
AACTA Awards (5th)	Best Cinematography in Television	Geoffrey Hall	Won
AACTA Awards (5th)	Best Editing in Television	Dany Cooper	Nominated
AACTA Awards (5th)	Best Sound in Television	Justine Angus	Won
AACTA Awards (5th)	Best Sound in Television	Jed Dodge	Won
AACTA Awards (5th)	Best Sound in Television	Des Kenneally	Won
AACTA Awards (5th)	Best Sound in Television	Robert Mackenzie	Won
AACTA Awards (5th)	Best Sound in Television	Liam Price	Won
AACTA Awards (5th)	Best Sound in Television	John Simpson	Won
AACTA Awards (5th)	Best Original Music Score in Television	David Bridie	Nominated
AACTA Awards (5th)	Best Production Design in Television	Pete Baxter	Nominated
