= Tim Piper =

Australian writer and director

- Born: 1971 or 1972 (age 54–55)
- Other name: Timothy David
- Occupation: Filmmaker
- Years active: 1999–present
- Known for: Co-founder of Piro production company
- Notable work: Farmed and Dangerous (2014)

Timothy David (born Timothy David Piper, 1971 or 1972), is an Australian writer and director. He is known for directing many television commercials, including Dove's 2008 "Evolution" ad, as well as Farmed and Dangerous, a four-part webisode comedy series released in 2014 for Chipotle Mexican Grill. His debut feature film is Kangaroo Island, which premiered at the Adelaide Film Festival on 3 November 2024.

== Early life and education ==
Timothy David Piper was born in South Australia in 1971 or 1972. He grew up in Adelaide.

He attended Prince Alfred College in Adelaide, graduating in 1989.

Piper left Australia in 2004.

== Career ==
=== Advertising ===
Piper was responsible for creating the gecko character for Bridgestone Australia around 1999, animated by James Neale and used until 2022. The character underwent a makeover by Cirkus Animation in 2023.

Working for Ogilvy & Mather in Toronto, Canada, Piper wrote and co-directed (with Yael Staav) Dove's "Evolution" television commercial. This was part of Dove's "Campaign for Real Beauty", which Piper had helped to develop with creative director Janet Kestin. This was a kind of "meta-marketing" campaign that aimed to show tricks used by advertisers, and to raise women's self-esteem when it was revealed that photos of women did not represent reality. He also produced another ad for Dove, called Onslaught, and a short for Becel margarine, Broken Escalator.

Among other commercials created with Ogilvy and Mather, Piper was a co-writer on the award-winning advertising campaign for "Diamond Shreddies" in Canada in 2008. The ad won the Grand Clio and Cannes awards.

=== Video, TV, and webseries ===
In 2013 he gained widespread attention for creating a viral video showing his wife, actress Sally Gifford Piper as a model, having her appearance radically transformed by photoshopping.

In 2014, Piper and Daniel M. Rosenberg worked to create, write, and produce Farmed and Dangerous, a four-part webisode comedy series for Chipotle Mexican Grill, in which his wife also appeared.

He was executive producer on the sitcom Odd Mom Out for Bravo, which ran for three seasons from 2015 to 2017.

=== Feature film ===
Under the name Timothy David, his debut feature film is a family drama, Kangaroo Island, which had its world premiere on the closing night of the Adelaide Film Festival on 3 November 2024. It was written by his wife Sally Gifford, and co-produced by Piper/David and Daniel Rosenberg, among others. It stars Rebecca Breeds, Adelaide Clemens, Erik Thomson, and Joel Jackson. Filming took place on Kangaroo Island, South Australia. The film won Best Australian Director in the London Director Awards, and earned four nominations in the 2026 Film Critics Circle of Australia awards, including Best Picture.

== Piro ==
Piper and American producer Daniel M. Rosenberg, who developed and executive produced Spike Lee's 2006 film Inside Man, co-founded the film production company Piro in New York. The company produces most of their commercial work.

== Accolades ==
Piper has won several advertising industry awards, including a Grand Clio and other Clio Awards; two Grand Prix in the Cannes Lions International Festival of Creativity; and D&AD Pencils.

In 2008, after the success of Dove's Evolution, Time magazine listed Piper as a finalist on its Time 100 list.

Creativity magazine listed Piper as one of the World's Top 50 Creative Thinkers, and made Time included him in their Top 200 Most Influential People in the World.

The New York Times reported third-party research showing that Farmed and Dangerous was more influential in changing audience behavior than 98 percent of films and TV shows of recent years that were made to have social impact (including An Inconvenient Truth and other well-known films).

== Personal life ==
Piper lived in New York City from around 2004. He married Canadian actress Sally Gifford, and they have two children. In 2016, they bought a holiday house on Kangaroo Island. They are both dual citizens.

The couple move between Australia and the US, and as of October 2024 David is still co-owner of Piro. They sold their apartment in New York when they moved to Australia for a year to make Kangaroo Island, and have found life in South Australia attractive for bringing up their young children.
