= The Starters =

Sports podcast and television series

- Genre: Sports (basketball)
- Presented by: Phil Elder; Tas Melas; Trey Kerby; Leigh Ellis
- Country of origin: United States
- Original language: English

Production
- Production locations: Atlanta, Georgia; Various NBA arenas or cities (special shows)
- Running time: 30 minutes

Original release
- Network: NBA TV
- Release: January 18, 2006 – June 14, 2019

The Starters was a podcast, blog, and television program that analyzed, and often satirized, the National Basketball Association (NBA). The show was written and hosted by Canadians Tas Melas and Phil Elder (J.E. Skeets), Australian Leigh Ellis and American Trey Kerby. It was shot, edited, and produced by Canadians Jason Doyle and Matt Osten.

The show was broadcast on NBA TV from 2013 to 2019 and was also available on YouTube. They also created and released regular audio-only podcasts.

Prior to joining NBA TV, this podcaster ensemble was known as The Basketball Jones.

The same team, minus Ellis and Osten, now host a daily NBA podcast called No Dunks.

== Background ==
Melas, Skeets, Doyle and Osten met while attending Ryerson University's Radio and Television Arts program in Toronto, Canada from 2001 to 2005.

Melas was the co-host of a talk show on SPIRITlive, Ryerson's Internet radio station, called the "Sports Doctors". Doyle produced the weekly program. Skeets also co-hosted a show on the station, though it was not sports related.

Upon graduation, Melas worked as a story editor at The Sports Network and Doyle worked as a sound editor for Super Sonics, an audio post-production house. Skeets worked at a physician recruiting firm and Osten attended law school at McGill University.

Skeets began blogging in 2005 when a friend bet him that he could not write a new post every day for a year. The blog was called "J.E. Skeets" and was a hodgepodge of observations, photos, and videos about random, quotidian topics. Later in the year, Skeets wrote a post about basketball which was linked on Deadspin.com. Noticing a significant spike in reader traffic, Skeets began writing exclusively about basketball, usually from an irreverent and humorous perspective. He began to make his name with a popular series titled, "Romance on the Hardwood". These posts featured a photograph of two NBA players who appeared to be slow dancing accompanied by an imagined conversation between the athletes.

Trey Kerby joined the team in 2010. He is the best known author of The Blowtorch's Big Book of Basketball Facts, a title that reached no. 1 on the New York Times Best Sellers List, and was Oprah's book of the week. The titled famously caused controversy in the U.K., when Richard & Judy refused to admit it to their book club, due to "ethical reasons".

== History ==
=== Beginnings (2006) ===
Skeets soon moved his writing to a new website the group called "The Basketball Jones". Drawing on his past experience with radio, Skeets decided to use the emerging medium of podcasting to produce a basketball-related talk show. He approached Melas and Doyle with the idea and together they worked out the tone and format of the show. When it debuted in January 2006, The Basketball Jones podcast was a half-hour program recorded weekly at Doyle's house. The show immediately gained a small, but dedicated following. As its popularity increased, the three began recording shows more frequently.

Each show consisted of segments dedicated to the on- and off-court happenings in the NBA separated by short musical breaks. Regular features included "Wanker of the Week", in which the hosts highlighted an NBA player, coach, or executive guilty of committing a gaffe and "One-on-One", in which the hosts took opposing views on a number of topics and argued over them in a "lightning-round" format. The show championed the "fan perspective" of sports reporting pioneered by ESPN's Bill Simmons. It also paid special attention to the NBA "blogosphere", a collection of bloggers who maintained web pages about their local teams. Many of these bloggers appeared on the show as experts on their particular team.

=== 2007–2013 ===
At the start of the '06 - '07 season, The Basketball Jones produced a daily in a 15-minute version called "The Fix" and in a half-hour weekly round-up episode. "The Fix" was recorded remotely by Doyle and the hosts interacted with each other through Skype from their respective homes. The group met on the weekend at Doyle's residence to record the longer show.

Though the show's audience grew, the three partners became unsatisfied with the poor audio quality yielded by recording the show over the Internet. During the '07 - '08 season, The Basketball Jones was recorded daily in a studio at Super Sonics Productions in downtown Toronto and produced as a 20-minute show. The improved sound quality, word of mouth, and Skeets' growing popularity as a writer on Deadspin.com brought more listeners, bouncing the show into iTunes' top 100 most popular podcasts. At this time, the website, thebasketballjones.net, registered approximately 60,000 page views per month. Towards the end of the season, Skeets was hired by Yahoo! Sports to edit their basketball blog which he renamed, "Ball Don't Lie".

For the '08 - '09 season, the show became a video podcast and was filmed in a downtown apartment building. The length of the show was shortened to 15 minutes. In addition to being available on thebasketballjones.net, the video podcast was also embedded daily on the Ball Don't Lie website.

Matt Osten, a Montreal native and graduate of McGill University's Faculty of Law, officially joined The Basketball Jones at the start of the '09 - '10 season. Osten, also nicknamed The Savage Bodyguard, only wears white suits while on bodyguard duty. Matt coined the phrase, "two towel performance", and regularly puts in a two towel performance during their off-season podcast, The Blank Jones.

Leigh Ellis joined the podcast during the No Season Required tour and later became a permanent member of the team. Born in Australia, Ellis is known for his unusual personal stories, a long-running "Tweet of the Week" segment, and his love for the pure fundamentals of basketball, such as free throws, jumpshot mechanics, and ball movement leading to easy layups.

The Basketball Jones recorded a live 500th episode on January 15, 2010.

On the 31st of October, 2012, The Basketball Jones combined their Video podcast on iTunes with their Audio podcast. This led to them reaching the No. 1 spot on iTunes for the number of listeners.

On March 1, 2010, The Basketball Jones proudly announced that they had officially joined The Score, a Canadian multi-media sports network.

During the 2011-2012 NBA season, The Basketball Jones made a deal with the NBA to produce content that would be featured on NBA TV and NBA.com.

During episode 1007, the final episode of the 2012–13 NBA season, The Basketball Jones announced that they would not be producing any Blank Jones podcasts during the offseason. The reason given to listeners was that TBJ was leaving the TheScore.com. It was confirmed the show would be continuing under a new umbrella, which at that time was unknown.

=== As The Starters (2013–2019) ===
On October 1, 2013, Tas Melas revealed that The Basketball Jones would not continue. The show relaunched in the 2013–14 NBA season on NBA TV, with episodes airing in late October. A video announcement was released on YouTube on October 2, 2013, where it was announced that TBJ was officially joining NBA TV and would continue as The Starters. The entire team has moved their operations from Toronto to the NBA TV headquarters in Atlanta, Georgia.

On October 21, 2013, The Starters launched their first podcast, the first of a group of previews answering 101 questions about the 2013–14 NBA season. The show has kept mostly the same format, with a few minor changes, most notably the removal of profanity.

In June 2019, The Starters have been ended after the contracts of the hosts and producers were expired by the end of Summer.

=== No Dunks (2019) ===
In 2019, The Starters joined The Athletic under the new name No Dunks, returning to a podcast-centred format. During this transition, Matt Osten left to pursue a writing career outside of the NBA sphere.

== Format ==
=== Original format ===
Each podcast began with Skeets announcing the number of the episode, the date and a random phrase (example: "Hello, sweet world!", "More is not always better.", "I'm the one who's fighting. Not you, not you, and not you." or "There are over a 1000 different types of bananas") over a random song. The "bouncing balls" opening graphics then continues with the theme song "Bones Attack!!" by The Meligrove Band.

The show continued with Skeets introducing each show with the greeting, "Good morning, sweet world!". Skeets introduced Melas, Kerby (who responds with the phrase "ayoooo"), and Leigh who said the phrase "Girls" and then Matt and Doyle (whom he referred to as the man who makes the magic and drops happen). Doyle responded with "Hello!". The hosts then switched off reading the daily headlines.

Then, the show was divided into one main talking segment followed by a shorter one that included viewers' questions, "The 'Whoa Boy' Fantasy Line of the Night", and the "Book-off picks", a feature in which the hosts competed at selecting winning teams based on gambling odds. The host with most losses at the end of the month had to do the 'Book-off Pay-off' in which the winner of the month chose something embarrassing for the loser to do. That was shown by the 'Book-off Pay-off: Repeat after me' on YouTube. Thursdays' shows typically featured a segment changing from week to week. Melas ended the show with a quote, to which Skeets replied, "Embrace the day people", followed by a sample of the song "Love Letter" by Easy Access Orchestra.

"The Overdose", the hour-long audio-only episode on Friday, featured interview and commentary and frequently diverted from basketball into the wacky stories from the NBA's week. "The Overdose" featured the Pun Gun game, where Skeets, Melas, Osten, Kerby and Ellis made puns on an NBA player's name; also Leigh Ellis shared his Tweets of the week suggested by listeners on Twitter.

Skeets' frequent malapropisms such as "The Internets" and mispronunciations such as Shane "Ba-ché", Melas' peculiar analogies and love of the phrase "There's no doubt about that", and Doyle's eclectic musical selections, as well as various "drops" including the infamous Kenny Smith quote "Gimme Some Raptor News", were all hallmarks of the show.

During the podcast's first three seasons, Caroline Lesley, a New York-based actress, introduced the show and recorded several interstitials that ran at the episode's breaks. She has not been incorporated into the video podcast.

Due to a switch in studios caused by Rogers Media purchasing The Score television channel, but not the website and mobile assets, The Basketball Jones discontinued distributing The Fix as a video podcast at the beginning the 2012–13 season. The Basketball Jones still live-streams video from The Fix on YouTube, but only releases the audio on their podcast feed. Additionally, "The Overdose" only appeared on the Grantland Network every third Friday for the 2012–13 season.

== Other work ==
Skeets' writing has appeared on ESPN.com and Deadspin.com.

Melas has appeared as a pundit on Raptors NBA TV.

Doyle is the co-host and producer of "Idol Chatter", a podcast about reality television. He has also done sound editing work for many animated television programs including Atomic Betty, Carl Squared, and Johnny Test.

The show has also been featured on ESPN, The New York Times, and The Globe and Mail.

For the 2012 and 2013 NBA seasons, the podcast was featured on Bill Simmons' Grantland Network podcast.
