= The X (TV series) =

Canadian children's television series

The X is a Canadian children's TV program on CBC Television, televised during the 2004-2005 television season. It was replaced by The Void in 2005, and The Outlet in 2006.

The show is targeted to children between the ages of eight and 12. Sally Gifford and Anthony McLean are in-studio hosts, who interview celebrities and do various comedy segments. The roles of the cast are not fixed and often vary. Morgan Waters goes on the road, across the country, interviewing children, ordinary people, and sometimes celebrities as well. At its inception, the program was named the InfoMatrix, was hosted by McLean and provided Canadian history. Gifford then joined the cast, followed by Morgan Waters, then Kythrine Butcher.

Anthony left at one point (there was a special episode dedicated to his leaving), and Waters moved on to The Morgan Waters Show.

== Recurring segments ==
- In each Professor Peabody segment, the professor thinks he has invented something new, but finds out his inventions are hardly original. The resulting humiliation then causes the professor to explode.
- The Daredevil Hedgehog performs various stunts (or attempts to).
- The character Bad Dog Tremblay is a professional wrestler, who normally only wrestles inanimate objects.
- The Naughty Pig, played by Julie Zwillich, is a small finger sized toy pig, which teaches children assorted lessons on life. However, usually the "lessons" are really what children should not do. He ends each "lesson" by relieving himself.
- The music and lyrics for the recurring segments were composed, written, and performed by Greg Fisher and Derek Treffry a.k.a. FISH-FRY MUSIC AND SOUND

== Celebrity appearances ==
Some of the celebrities that have appeared as guests on the show are Claire Danes (actress), Fefe Dobson (singer), Hilary Duff (actress/singer), JoJo (singer), Nelly Furtado (singer), Katie Holmes (actress), Jude Law (actor), Lindsay Lohan (actress/singer), Christina Milian (actress/singer), Gwyneth Paltrow (actress), Kalan Porter (singer), Ashlee Simpson (actress/singer), and Skye Sweetnam (singer). Rather than just ask the typical interview questions, hosts usually ask odd questions such as what type of superhero power would they like to have, or what girls do when they go together to the bathroom all at once.

== Cast ==
- Sally Gifford - Host
- Anthony McLean - Host
- Morgan Waters - Host of Rollin' X segments
- Kristyn Butcher - Host of Rollin' X segments
- David Reale (2004-)
- Caroline Lesley (2004) - Host
- Jeff Kassel - Mr. Peabody
- David J. MacNeil - Bad Dog Tremblay
- Ramona Pringle (2004-)
- Julie Zwillich- Voice of Naughty Pig, Alissa, Sandra
