= Evolution (advertisement) =

Advertising campaign by Unilever in 2006

Evolution (The Evolution Of Beauty)
- Promotional image for Evolution
- Agency: Ogilvy & Mather (Toronto)
- Client: Unilever
- Language: English; French
- Running time: 75 seconds
- Product: Dove Campaign for Real Beauty
- Release date: October 6, 2006 (online)
- Directed by: Yael Staav; Tim Piper
- Music by: The Flashbulb ("Passage D")
- Starring: Stephanie Betts
- Production company: Reginald Pike
- Country: Canada
- Budget: C$135,000
- Preceded by: Daughters
- Followed by: Onslaught
- Official website: http://www.campaignforrealbeauty.ca/

Evolution, also called The Evolution Of Beauty, is an advertising campaign launched by Unilever in 2006 as part of its Dove Campaign for Real Beauty, to promote the newly created Dove Self-Esteem Fund. The centre of the Unilever campaign is a 75-second spot produced by Ogilvy & Mather in Toronto, Ontario, Canada. The piece was first displayed online on 6 October 2006, and was later broadcast as a television and cinema spot in the Netherlands and the Middle East. The ad was created from the budget left over from the earlier Daughters campaign, and was intended to be the first in a series of such online-focused campaigns by the company. Later such videos include Onslaught and Amy. Evolution was directed by Canadian director Yael Staav and Tim Piper, with sound design handled by the Vapor Music Group, and post-production by SoHo.

The advert was a critical, popular, and financial success. It won a number of awards in the advertising industry, including two Cannes Lions Grand Prix awards and an Epica D'Or. It has been discussed in many mainstream television programmes and print publications, and the exposure generated by the spot has been estimated to be worth over $150M. Evolution has also spawned numerous unofficial alternate versions, including a title sequence to a BBC sketch show and the short parody Slob Evolution, which has gone on to itself be nominated for a Daytime Emmy Award.

== Sequence ==
The film opens with a "pretty, but ordinary girl" (Canadian cartoonist and television producer Stephanie Betts) entering and sitting down in a studio. Two harsh lights are then switched on and the first bars of The Flashbulb's "Passage D," a breakcore-piece with piano accompaniment, are heard. The short credits sequence provides the title of the film and credit to Dove. The camera then switches to a time lapse sequence, showing makeup and hair artist Diana Carreiro making Betts up and adjusting her hair, transforming her into a "strikingly beautiful billboard model." When the final physical adjustments of Betts's appearance have been made, the team members all move off-camera, and a series of camera flashes begins as the photographer takes shots of Betts in various poses.

One shot is selected from the batch and moved into a generic image editing software interface, where a series of "Photoshopping" adjustments are made to alter Betts's appearance even further, including but not limited to lengthening her neck, adjusting the curve of her shoulders, altering her hair and skin, and enlarging her eyes and mouth. The final image of Betts, now rendered almost unrecognizable, is then transferred to a billboard advertisement for the fictional "Easel" (or "Fasel") brand of foundation makeup. As the camera zooms out from the billboard, two young girls can be seen walking past and looking up at Betts' heavily edited image. The video fades to the statement, "No wonder our perception of beauty is distorted." The film ends with an invitation to take part in the "Dove Real Beauty Workshops," the logo for the Dove Self-Esteem Fund, and, in some versions, the website address of Unilever-Dove's Campaign For Real Beauty, for which the film was originally produced.

== Background ==
The Dove Campaign For Real Beauty was launched by Unilever in 2003, to coincide with the expansion of the Dove brand from soaps and other cleansing solutions to health and beauty products in general, including deodorants, shower gels, hair-care and skin-care products. The first stage of the campaign centred around a series of billboard advertisements, initially put up in the United Kingdom, and later worldwide. The spots showcased photographs of regular women (in place of professional models), taken by portrait photographer Annie Leibovitz. The ads invited passers-by to vote on whether a particular model was, for example, "Fat or Fab" or "Wrinkled or Wonderful", and the results of the votes dynamically updated and displayed on the billboard itself. Accompanying the billboard advertisements was the publication of the "Dove Report", a corporate study which Unilever intended to "[create] a new definition of beauty [which] will free women from self-doubt and encourage them to embrace their real beauty."

The series received significant media coverage from talk shows, women's magazines, and mainstream news broadcasts and publications, generating media exposure which Unilever has estimated to be worth more than 30 times the paid-for media space. Following this success, the campaign expanded into other media, including a series of television spots (Flip Your Wigs and the Pro-Age series, among others) and print advertisements ("Tested on Real Curves"). This culminated in the 2006 Little Girls global campaign, which featured regional versions of the same advertisement in both print and screen, for which Unilever purchased a 30-second spot in the commercial break during Super Bowl XL at an estimated cost of US$2.5M.

In 2006, Ogilvy & Mather were seeking to extend the campaign further, by creating one or more viral videos to host on the Campaign for Real Beauty website. The first of these, Daughters, was an interview-style piece intended to show how mothers and daughters related to issues surrounding the modern perception of beauty and the beauty industry. It was during the production of Daughters that a series of short films titled "Beauty Crackdown", one of which was Evolution, was promoted to Unilever as an "activation idea". The concept was one that art director Tim Piper pushed; he proposed to have Evolution produced using the money left over from the budget for Daughters. This ended up amounting to a total of C$135,000. It was originally intended to get people to the Campaign for Real Beauty website to see Daughters, and to participate in the workshops featured on the site.

== Production ==
Comparison of sound in Evolution (played first) to "Passage D"
After selecting "Passage D" as a soundtrack, editors spent fifteen hours remixing the track; much of the sound from drum synthesisers was removed, and background noise such as sped-up human voices was added.

The team brought together for the ad included director Yael Staav, the first female director to win a Cannes Lion (for Hugging, a campaign for the ALS Society of Canada), fashion photographers Tiko Poulakakis and Gabor Jurina, makeup artist Diana Carreiro, art director Tim Piper, and Piper's then-girlfriend Stephanie Betts as the model. Betts, a cartoonist and producer of Canadian animated television programming such as Producing Parker, was chosen as the model for Evolution in part because Piper was first inspired to write the piece after seeing the amount of time his girlfriend spent applying make-up, and he felt that she would be an ideal "representation of the norm", highlighting the extreme changes that models undergo in the fashion industry. She was originally dubious about taking on the role but later stated that she was proud that she joined the campaign.

The actual production itself took place over the course of a single day, and over two-and-a-half hours of footage was taken for the make-up portion of the film. This was eventually condensed to 23 seconds in the final version. The stage was dressed in a manner identical to that of modern fashion shoots, with the lighting and camera being positioned to remove any shadows from Betts's face to aid in the post-production retouching. Sound design took three weeks, and was divided into two sections. Fifteen hours were spent creating several mixes of "Passage D" with each mix tested and discarded before the version used in the final film was settled upon. A further nine hours were spent adding in the various background noises to the piece, including sped-up human voices, a starter pistol and galloping racehorses.

Post-production at SoHo was originally planned to take approximately three days, but it was extended to two weeks. Gabor Jurina, the photographer responsible for the digital retouching of the actual photographs taken of Betts during the shoot, supplied the post-production team with 118 digital stills of the intermediate stages of the transformation from the "real" photograph of the made-up Betts to the final image shown on the billboard. These were re-cut and assembled to create the functions shown in the "Photoshopping" sequence, such as stretching Betts's neck and adjusting the size of certain of her facial features. Other post-production work included stabilising Betts's head in the center of the shot during the make-up sequence, covering certain continuity errors, creating and compositing the billboard advertisement, and constructing a false image-editing interface.

== Release and reception ==
Evolution was incorporated into the Canadian Campaign for Real Beauty website on 6 October 2006 in order to coincide with the start of the Los Angeles Fashion Week, and was uploaded by art director Tim Piper to video sharing website YouTube shortly after. While it has remained a largely internet-based campaign, Evolution has appeared as a television commercial in the Netherlands and the Middle East, and in the U.S. inside commercial breaks in The Hills.

Once uploaded, the advert was viewed over 40,000 times in its first day, 1.7 million times within a month of its upload, and 12 million times within its first year. Even without having appeared offline, the advert was discussed by a number of mainstream television programmes, including Good Morning America, The Ellen DeGeneres Show, and The View, and news networks such as CNN, NBC, and ABC News; the overwhelming majority came out in support of the campaign's message. Spaces at the mother and daughter workshops sold out almost immediately, and the total exposure generated through the $50,000 piece was estimated by Ogilvy & Mather in October 2006 as being worth around $150M. Comparisons have often been drawn up between the campaign and Dove's earlier purchase of a 30-second spot for Little Girls during the Super Bowl XL. The Super Bowl spot cost an estimated $2.5M, reached an audience of 500 million, and generated only one third of the boost in traffic to the Campaign for Real Beauty website of Evolution. The spot was also credited for its part in producing double-figure growth in sales of Dove product, and Unilever reported that its overall sales in the period following the release of Evolution rose by 5.8%, up from 3.9% the previous year.

Evolution was particularly popular with critics within the advertising industry, and has garnered a number of awards since its debut in October 2006. It was the favourite in the run up to the Cannes Lions to win the festival's Grand Prix in the Cyber category, generally considered one of the most prestigious awards in the industry. Ultimately, the prize went to three entries: Nike+, advertising the Nike brand, Heidies 15 MB of Fame, promoting fashion company Diesel S.p.A.'s website and products, and Evolution. Evolution also went on to win the Grand Prix in the Film category, beating Pretty from Nike, Inc., Paint for Sony's BRAVIA line of high-definition television sets, and The Power of Wind for the Wind Energy Initiative. The victory attracted a certain amount of controversy, as the jury switched Evolution from the "Fundraising & Appeals" category, whose entries are ineligible to win the Grand Prix, to the "Corporate Image" category at the last minute. Chairman of the jury Bob Scarpelli said of the decision, "We moved it into another category because we felt that strongly about it. We were not trying to break rules or set precedents, we just went with our hearts and minds, and asked the festival if we could move it." As a result of the win, Evolution became the first entry in the festival's history to take home Grand Prix awards from two categories and the first web-based advertisement to win in the Film category (followed in 2009 by Philips' Carousel)

The piece went on to win a number of other awards, including a silver Clio Award (in the Toiletries/Pharmaceuticals category), the Film Grand Prix and two Gold prizes at the London International Awards, an Epica D'Or and Gold Prize in the Interactive category of the Epica Awards, among others.

== Music copyright violations ==
On October 17, 2017, the original version of Evolution along with hundreds of copies were removed from YouTube and other video hosting sites due to copyright violation citing "Alphabasic Records" or "Alphabasic Publishing" as the claimant. According to Benn Jordan, the writer and owner of the music, Dove had allegedly failed to renew or pay for the music license, causing the publisher and YouTube to remove the videos. On November 8, 2017, Jordan claimed that despite many attempts to resolve the issue, Dove has continued to use his music illegally by not renewing the license.

== Legacy ==
=== Slob Evolution ===
Slob Evolution, a parody of the original Evolution spot, went on to be nominated for a Daytime Emmy Award.

The popularity of Evolution and its presence on many video-sharing websites led inevitably to a large number of alternate versions and parodies being uploaded by the public. In under six months, parodies on YouTube alone received over 5 million hits between them, Of these, by far the most successful was a professionally made piece entitled Slob Evolution.

Slob Evolution is an Emmy Award-nominated short film created as a parody of the original Evolution spot in late 2006. The piece was directed by Simon Willows, known for his work on the Volvic mineral water television and cinema commercials, and was produced by Claire Jones with the production company Blink Productions. Post-production work was done by Framestore CFC.

In Slob Evolution, the role of the model is taken by a teenage boy who, instead of having make-up applied in the time-lapse sequence, is given fast food, alcoholic beverages, and cigarettes, transforming over the course of thirty seconds into an overweight middle-aged slob. Further adjustments are made in a similar image-editing interface to that used in Evolution,. The subject's neck is shortened, his features made more asymmetric, and a tattoo is added. The image is transferred to a billboard advertisement for the fictional "Lardo" brand of "man cream", and the piece ends with a fade to the statement, "Thank God our perception of reality is distorted. No one wants to look at ugly people."

The parody was uploaded to video-sharing website YouTube on December 4, 2006 and was promoted only through a seeding of 30 e-mails. Within its first month, Slob Evolution received over 278,000 hits. It went on to be nominated for a number of prestigious awards, including the "Comedy: Short Form" and "Viral" categories of the 2007 Webby Awards, and in the "Outstanding Broadband Comedy" category of the 2007 Daytime Emmy Awards. The popular and critical attention that Blink Productions received for Slob Evolution led to Tiger Aspect, the production company behind the 2007 BBC comedy sketch show Ruddy Hell! It's Harry and Paul, contacting the production company to produce an introduction to the show in a similar vein.

A frame from the introduction sequence of Ruddy Hell! It's Harry and Paul, showing the familiar billboard.

The title sequence to Ruddy Hell! It's Harry and Paul begins with a shot of Morwenna Banks and Laura Solon. The familiar time-lapse sequence shows the pair being given several pints of lager, cigarettes, and fast food. Their hair is cut and their make-up removed as they slowly morph into Harry Enfield and Paul Whitehouse, the joint hosts of Ruddy Hell! It's Harry And Paul. After bras are removed from the pair's shirts, the camera zooms out to show a billboard advertisement similar to that in Slob Evolution, with the show's title displayed underneath.

=== Other works ===
Shortly after releasing Evolution online, post-production company SoHo uploaded a five-minute making-of documentary, which includes interviews with creative directors Janet Kestin and Tim Piper, photographer Gabor Jurina, post-production director Paul Gowan, digital artists Kevin Gibson and Terry Rose, and sound designer Andrew Harris, who discuss the various stages of the post-production process behind the creation of the spot. The making-of also includes a shot of Evolution's storyboard and a short segment of behind-the-scenes footage from the shoot itself, showing Stephanie Betts before and after the make-up process.

After the debut of Evolution, Dove quickly ordered several follow-up online advertisements, the first two of which (Onslaught and Amy) appeared online in October 2007. These were also written and directed by Tim Piper. The pair are predicted to prove at least as popular as Evolution. Other companies have attempted to use the same formula, with mixed results. Among the more-commented on campaigns is Beauty is..., launched by Nivea in 2007 and comprising television, print, and online segments which push the same message as the Dove campaign.

== See also ==
- Dove Real Beauty Sketches

Preceded by noitulovE	Cannes Lions Film Grand Prix Winner; 2007	Succeeded by Gorilla; Believe
