= Alliance for Women Film Composers =

Advocacy organization

The Alliance for Women Film Composers (AWFC) is an organization dedicated to advocacy and visibility for women composers. As of 2019, there are nearly 400 members in the AWFC's database.

== History ==
The Alliance for Women Film Composers was founded in 2014 by Lolita Ritmanis, Laura Karpman, and Miriam Cutler. Its advocacy work includes a searchable online directory of women composers, interpersonal support, networking events, and live concerts. One such concert was the subject of the 2017 documentary Women Who Score.

== Leadership ==
=== Current ===
- Co-Presidents: Heather McIntosh, Allyson Newman
- Vice President: EmmoLei Sankofa
- Secretary: Daisy Coole
- Treasurer: Thomas Mikusz
- Executive Director: Alexandra Borden
- Board of Directors:
  - Alexandra Petkovski
  - Aisling Brouwer
  - Arbel Bedak
  - Carla Patullo
  - Connor Cook
  - Holly Amber Church
  - Jenna Fentimen (UK)
  - Lili Haydn
  - Mandy Hoffman
  - Raashi Kulkarni
  - Sandrine Rudaz
  - Taura Stinson
  - Zoë Lustri

=== Past ===
- President: Catherine Joy
- President: Lolita Ritmanis (2017-2019)
- President: Laura Karpman

=== Founders ===
- Lolita Ritmanis
- Laura Karpman
- Miriam Cutler
