= I Met a Girl (film) =

2020 Australian film

- Theatrical release poster
- Directed by: Luke Eve
- Written by: Glen Dolman
- Produced by: Adam Dolman
- Starring: Brenton Thwaites; Lily Sullivan; Joel Jackson; Zahra Newman; Anita Hegh
- Cinematography: Patrick O'Sullivan
- Edited by: Melanie Annan
- Music by: Matteo Zingales
- Production company: Monsoon Pictures
- Distributed by: Gravitas Ventures (United States)
- Release date: 11 September 2020
- Running time: 108 minutes
- Country: Australia
- Language: English
- Box office: $7,727

I Met a Girl is a 2020 Australian romantic drama film directed by Luke Eve and written by Glen Dolman. The film stars Brenton Thwaites, Lily Sullivan, Joel Jackson, Zahra Newman and Anita Hegh.

It was released on 11 September 2020, by Gravitas Ventures in the United States.

== Premise ==
A young man who has schizophrenia embarks on a journey across Australia to find Lucy, the woman of his dreams, whom he met in Perth - or did he?

== Cast ==
- Brenton Thwaites as Devon
- Lily Sullivan as Lucy
- Joel Jackson as Nick
- Zahra Newman as Olivia
- Anita Hegh as Patricia
- David Woods as Soul
- Peter Rowsthorn as Mr. Rocket
- Anni Finsterer as Miss Needle
- Vivienne Garrett as Female Driver
- Dan Paris as TV host
- Amy Mathews as Senior Constable Harrison

== Production ==
The film was director Luke Eve's first feature film. He researched the mental health issues it portrays thoroughly, and consulted the mental health organisation SANE about the script. He described the film as "not a hard hitting portrayal of mental illness. It's about somebody with schizophrenia, but wrapped up in a fantastical love story".

After being filmed in Australia, the film's festival and theatre release schedule was interrupted by the COVID-19 pandemic.

== Release ==
I Met a Girl had its world premiere at the 25th Busan International Film Festival. It was released in the United States and Canada by Gravitas Ventures on 11 September 2020 as a premium video on demand release, followed by release on streaming platforms Hulu and Amazon.

It was subsequently released in cinemas in Germany and South Korea, and on Netflix in Australia and New Zealand on 2 April 2021.

== Reception ==
Roger Moore of Movie Nation gave the film a 2/4 and said "The best one can say for the script is that it gives the charming stars a nice moment or two, and that it generally doesn't fall for the "Love can cure what ails you" mental health rom-com trap." John Nolan of Punch Drunk Critics scored the film 2.5/5 stars, stating "While new ground isn't exactly broken I Met A Girl does an admirable job delivering exactly what fans of this emerging sub-genre are looking for while being respectful of the struggles faced by it's [sic] protagonist."

ScreenHub Australia gave the film 3.5/5 stars. Andrew F. Peirce of The Curb praised Thwaites' performance, and called the film "a proudly grounded, human experience... that lingers longer in your mind than the possible light rom-com filmic creation that the base synopsis would suggest".
