= Sally Gifford =

Canadian actress

Sally Gifford Piper
- Born: Sally Gifford; Toronto, Canada
- Occupations: Actress, TV presenter
- Years active: 1999–present
- Spouse: Tim Piper

Sally Gifford Piper, usually credited as Sally Gifford, is a Canadian or American actress. She is known for hosting CBC Television's national children's show, The-X, and for appearing in a viral video filmed by her husband in 2013, which showed the effect of photoshopping photos of women.

== Early life and education ==
Sally Gifford was born in Toronto, Canada, and attended high school at Northern Secondary School in that city.

She graduated with a BA in Theatre and Sociology (Hons) from Queen's University, and went on to study at the American Academy of Dramatic Arts in New York City.

== Acting career ==
=== Stage ===
Gifford performed in plays at Theatre Kingston and the Thousand Islands Playhouse while attending university, including in Lions in the Streets (1999), The River (2000), Perfect Pie (2001), and Hay Fever (2001).

=== TV and film ===
In 2004, Gifford become the host of the CBC's The-X. She was also selected to host the "Battle of the Mascots", a kids segment, that was part of CBC's coverage of the 2004 Grey Cup.

In 2005 she appeared with Michael Ironside in the short film On That Day about the horrors of war. She has also guest-starred on various TV shows.

In 2007 Gifford appeared in the drama television film In God's Country. She also played a recurring role of Tanya in MVP on Soapnet, and appeared in the 2008 film Killing Mr. Kissel.

She was also one of 16 improvisational actors in the film subHysteria (2010).

Gifford played Amanda in the 2013–14 miniseries Farmed and Dangerous.

Gifford wrote the script for the drama feature film Kangaroo Island, directed by her husband Tim (as Timothy David). Filmed on Kangaroo Island in South Australia, it has its world premiere at the 2024 Adelaide Film Festival on 3 November 2024.

== Personal life ==
Gifford is married to Australian filmmaker Tim Piper (also known as Timothy David).

In 2013 she gained widespread attention for appearing in a viral video showing her appearance radically transformed by Photoshop, which was directed by her husband Tim. The video was first posted on Global Democracy in 2012, with the aim of forcing advertisers to publish disclaimers on airbrushed ads, and went viral in October 2013.

Gifford also served as one of the two creators, writers, and executive producers for Farmed and Dangerous, in which she appeared.
