= Benn Jordan =

American musician and science communicator

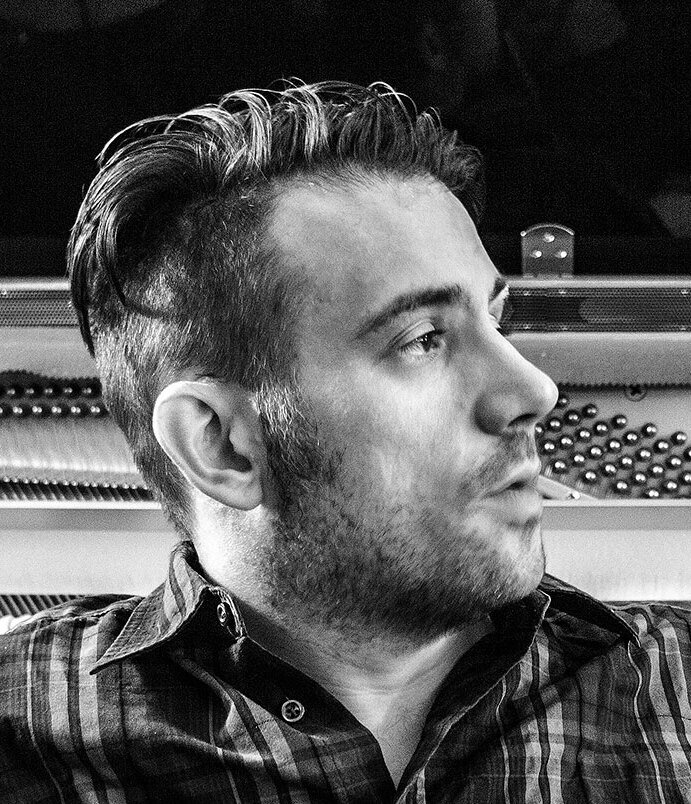
- Jordan, 2014

Background information
- Also known as: The Flashbulb, Acidwolf, CHR15TPUNCH3R, DJ ASCII, Dr. Lefty, Dysrythmia, FlexE, Human Action Network, Lucid32, MC Flashbulb, rnd16, 66x, Q-Bit
- Born: Benn Lee Jordan; October 28, 1979 (age 47); West Englewood, Chicago, Illinois, U.S.
- Genres: IDM, breakcore, glitch, drill and bass, ambient, modern classical, acid techno
- Instruments: Guitar, piano, keyboards, modular synthesizer, bass guitar, DAW, sampler
- Years active: 1993–present
- Website: bennjordan.com

Benn Lee Jordan (born October 28, 1979) is an American musician operating under pseudonyms. Since 1999, his music has been released under the names of the Flashbulb, Acidwolf, Human Action Network, and FlexE. He runs a YouTube channel, covering acoustic science, the music business, technology and their interfaces, as well as privacy and consumer-rights issues.

== Biography ==
Jordan was born in 1979 and raised in West Englewood, Chicago, by his mother and grandparents. An only child growing up in a derelict neighborhood, he taught himself guitar as a child. Due to being left-handed and not having lessons, he learned to play a right-handed guitar upside down, which he continues to do. He began his music career releasing instrumental music on small labels in the United States and Europe in 1996 under various aliases, most notably the Flashbulb. In addition to releasing music and touring, he began to work as a freelance composer for various television and film agencies.

== Musical style ==
As the Flashbulb, Jordan typically releases electronic or cinematic styled music. His style differs strongly between albums, but they all have a cohesive bond tied around intricate drum programming, jazz-influenced melodies, and an array of live instrumentation. He also often records his melodies through MIDI-synced guitars. His guitar style and skill have gained attention because he typically plays the guitar strung backwards, and makes heavy use of fast sweeping and tapping. More recent Flashbulb albums have featured violinist Greg Hirte, who is also featured heavily on the Flashbulb's 2008 album, Soundtrack to a Vacant Life. This album is, as Jordan stated in a 2008 interview, a step away from the breakcore genre. He also said that this step is likely to be a permanent trend in the direction of his music, a move that was supported by releases under his own name, such as Pale Blue Dot and Louisiana Mourning. However, the 2012 album Hardscrabble represents a return to the harder electronic music heard on releases like Kirlian Selections or Flexing Habitual. The record is named for an area in the Bridgeport neighborhood of Jordan's own Chicago.

Under other aliases, his Acidwolf and Human Action Network aliases feature retro acid music that uses old drum machines such as the TR-808 and relies heavily on the melodies of the TB-303. Tracks made under the FlexE alias tend to be laid-back and classic acid. According to him, he showcases his more fundamental, classical, and personal pieces under his own name, Benn Jordan.

== Composing for television and film ==
Jordan has seen much success in composing for television and film. In 2006 he composed the original score for the Josh C. Waller short The Nail.

In 2006, Jordan's music ("Passage D" from his album Kirlian Selections) was featured in Dove's "Evolution" promotional campaign for its Campaign for Real Beauty website, which has drawn a large amount of attention from the mainstream media. The campaign took the commercial film winner at Cannes, as well as many other prestigious awards. In addition, Jordan was nominated for a 2007 London International Award for the "Best Use Of Music" category; he went on to win the ceremony's grand prize. In 2008, he was nominated again at the London International Awards for "Best Use of Music," although he did not take the grand prize. In 2008 he was also a Webby Award nominee and took the Grand Prix at the Cannes Film Festival. In 2008, Jordan had completed work in branding, having created stings and trademark sounds for companies such as Dove and Verizon.

In July 2012, he released an original score entitled The Universe, which was commissioned by Chicago's Adler Planetarium for a new interactive exhibit dedicated to the evolution of the universe. In 2013, he was commissioned to score their show entitled "Cosmic Wonder". In 2016 he composed the soundtrack to the Adler Planetarium's sky show Planet Nine.

Jordan composes for film, television, and gaming through various agencies; he also owns and operates his own production and recording facilities in Marietta, Georgia.

== Alphabasic and music piracy ==
After the collapse of Sublight Records, instead of taking on another contract, Jordan purchased his previous licenses and released his most anticipated album, Soundtrack to a Vacant Life, on his own record label, Alphabasic Records. On the day of its release, he personally uploaded copies of the album to music piracy sites, including a small HTML file explaining his relaxed views on file sharing and showing listeners where they could give support if they desired. This resulted in attention by the mainstream press, and the album became the most downloaded album on many popular file sharing networks.

Jordan has spoken on issues of net neutrality, free speech, and copyright laws in the music world. In an interview with TorrentFreak, he encourages involvement in these issues and warns against corporations like Amazon or iTunes and their ability to stem the free flow of information. File sharing, to Jordan, is a way of bypassing this potential oppression and accessing information freely. In the interview, Jordan notes that "file trading is just a peephole to a much larger picture. Copyright, in its current state, holds information at ransom for monetary value. While in music it can stifle culture and art, with literature and education it can be nothing less than a weapon of class warfare."

In a 2024 episode of The New Music Business podcast Jordan reviewed these perspectives in the context of having been the subject of False Streaming Activity and having had his music taken down by distributors.

== Philanthropy ==
Benn Jordan was the founder and president of 32 Forty, a non-profit music education center located in south Chicago. The music center (now closed), extended services to help independent recording artists with publishing and licensing. In 2011, Jordan released a large collection of unreleased music, titled "Old Trees (1999–2011)" with all proceeds going to UNICEF. Jordan is also an ambassador for Unearthed Pictures, a foundation dedicated to publicizing and stopping the sexual exploitation of children and funding safe houses in North America, Africa, and Asia.

== Personal life ==
In 2014, Jordan left Chicago and moved his home studio to an isolated home in Smyrna, Georgia but moved again in 2024 to a barn outside Atlanta, Georgia where he set up a studio.

He trains and competes in mixed martial arts and Brazilian jiu-jitsu in his spare time. In a 2007 interview with CueMix magazine, Jordan discussed his diagnosis of bipolar disorder. In 2024, Jordan was diagnosed with ADHD.

=== YouTube ===
Jordan has a self-titled YouTube channel (previously titled Benn and Gear). On his channel, he creates educational videos relating to music making. In 2020, Jordan stated that he was threatened with legal action after posting a video about LRADs.

== Discography ==
=== As The Flashbulb ===
==== LPs ====
- M³ (2000, Metatone Records)
- These Open Fields (2001, Alphabasic) (re-released in 2002 as "These Open Fields (Second Edition)")
- Girls.Suck.But.YOU.Don't (2003, Accel Muzhik)
- Resent and the April Sunshine Shed (2003, Alphabasic)
- Red Extensions of Me (2004, Bohnerwachs Tontraeger)
- Kirlian Selections (2005, Sublight)
- Réunion (2005, Sublight)
- Flexing Habitual (2006, Sublight)
- Soundtrack to a Vacant Life (2007, Alphabasic)
- Arboreal (2010, Alphabasic)
- Love as a Dark Hallway (2011, Alphabasic)
- Opus at the End of Everything (2012, Alphabasic)
- Hardscrabble (2012, Alphabasic)
- Nothing is Real (2014, Alphabasic)
- Solar One (2014, Alphabasic)
- Compositions for Piano (2015, Alphabasic)
- Piety Of Ashes (2017, Alphabasic)
- Dormant (Movement 1 Through 7) (2018, Alphabasic)
- Our Simulacra (2020, Alphabasic)
- Seven Quarantine Poems (2021, Alphabasic)
- Kirlian Tapes v1.0 (2022, Alphabasic)
- Papillon (2025, Alphabasic)

==== EPs ====
- Sleep Radio (1998, Suburban Trash)
- Ephedrine EP (1999, Metatone Records)
- Fly! (2001, Metatone Records)
- Drain Mode = ON (2001, Bohnerwachs Tontraeger)
- Lawn Funeral EP (2003, Sublight)
- Binedump EP (2005, Bohnerwachs Tontraeger)
- That Missing Week EP (December 8, 2007, Alphabasic)
- Terra Firma EP (December 14, 2011, Alphabasic)
- aBliss (May 27, 2015, Alphabasic)

=== As Benn Jordan ===
- Digital Sex (1996) (LP)
- Sleep (1997) (EP)
- Phoenix² (1998) (LP)
- The Best Of Benn L. Jordan Volume 2 (1999, Metatone Records)
- The Nail (Original Motion Picture Score) (2006, Alphabasic) (EP)
- Pale Blue Dot (2008, Alphabasic) (LP)
- Louisiana Mourning (September 1, 2009, Alphabasic) (EP)
- Old Trees (1999–2011) (2011, Alphabasic) (compilation)
- The Universe Original Score (July 9, 2012, Alphabasic) (EP)
- Cosmic Wonder (Original Motion Picture Score) (May 17, 2013, Alphabasic) (LP)
- Planet Nine (Original Soundtrack) (May 19, 2016, Alphabasic) (LP)

=== As other aliases ===
- 66x – Diffusion (1994)
- 66x – 40,000 Whores (1995)
- 66x – The Art of Killing Pain (1996)
- 66x – An Opening (1996)
- DJ ASCII – Untitled (1999)
- Lucid32 – Lucid32 (1999)
- Dysrythmia – Clone EP (1999)
- Dysrythmia – The Puncture (2000)
- CHR15TPUNCH3R – Sielle (2000, Alphabasic)
- Q-Bit – I Love Anna Log (2000, Alphabasic) (EP)
- FlexE – Programmable Love Songs Vol. 1 (2004, Nophi) (LP)
- Acidwolf – Legacy 1995–2005 (2005, Dirty Dancing Recordings, Alphabasic) (LP)
- Dr. Lefty – Get Mad Now EP (2006, Reject Records) (EP)
- Human Action Network – Welcome to Chicago (The Acid Anthology) (2007, Alphabasic) (LP)

=== Singles ===
- "Me Touching Dead Air" (2000, Radio York, England)
- "Machine Drum – Late Night Operation (Benn Jordan Mix)" (2009, digital download)
- "Vague Detroit (UAS 303 Remix)" (2009, Digital Download) as Human Action Network
- "A Raw Understanding" (February 26, 2010, Alphabasic) as The Flashbulb

=== As featured artist ===
- Bogdan Raczynski – Untitled 7" – (2002, Rephlex) "Fnck You Dj" (remixed by the Flashbulb w/ Nautilis)
- Various Artists – Big System Morsels (2004, 2playermusic) – "Parkways" as Benn L. Jordan and "Everyday Blue" as The Flashbulb
- Various Artists – The Sound of One Constant Pitch (2004, Nophi) – "Lawn Wake V (featuring Admiral T)" as The Flashbulb
- Various Artists – We Are The Music Makers | Volume One (2004, WATMM Records) – "She's Moving Along Right Now But I'm Not Going To Be Dramatic" as The Flashbulb
- The Red Moon Big Band – Love At Orange (2004, Maestro-Matic) (LP) (collaboration – credited as Benn Jordan for synthesizer and samples)
- Machine Drum – Mergerz & Acquisitionz (2006, Merck) – "Cherokee Lectro Mix" (by Acidwolf)
- Various Artists – 030303 (2006, Marguerita Recordings) – "Blue Morning Drive" as Acidwolf
- Various Artists – Do:Nation Volume 1 – A Compilation for the Animal Charities of America (2006, Nophi) – "Ant IDM" as The Flashbulb
- Various Artists – Eyelicker (2006, Sublight) – Hometown UFO as The Flashbulb
- Various Artists – 30 Days (2006, Peppermill Records) – "Smoking Blue Midi" as The Flashbulb
- Various Artists – Imaginary Friends (2007, Sublight) – "Our Furry Past Life" as The Flashbulb
- Digita'lis/Phlox – The Drummondii Days (2007, GOZombie Records) – "A Shape of Strange Faith" (The Flashbulb Remix)
- Bartel – Bartel (2009, Alphabasic) – "White Grade" (remixed by The Flashbulb)
- Various Artists – GOZOMBIE Growing Compilation (2010, GOZombie Records) – "Zeke Acid" as The Flashbulb
