= Vincent Lamberti =

American chemist and inventor

- Born: c.1927 or 1928
- Died: March 21, 2014
- Occupations: Inventor, chemist
- Spouse: Ileana Lamberti
- Children: Vincent James Lamberti; Laana Peters

Vincent Lamberti (c. 1927/28 – March 21, 2014) was an American chemist and inventor, who held 118 granted patents, and is best known as the inventor of Dove soap.

== Early life ==
Vincent Lamberti grew up in Meriden, Connecticut, the youngest son of immigrant parents from Avellino. He was so advanced academically that according to his son, Vincent James, he substitute-taught his high school physics class when the teacher was absent. While in high school, he met his future wife, Ileana. Lamberti won a scholarship to Yale University, where he was thought of as such a "geek" that his dorm mates were known to lock him out of his room, forcing him to climb up a drain pipe to get back into his dormitory. He was a member of Phi Beta Kappa Society and the Sigma Xi society. He earned his undergraduate degree in 1947 and earned a doctorate in organic chemistry in 1951.

== Career ==
Lamberti joined Lever Brothers in 1949 after interviewing with major drug and chemical companies. Lamberti spent 40 years with the company, mostly at its Edgewater, New Jersey research center, where, as patent coordinator and manager of organic chemistry, he led a team to create new and improved products. In the 1950s, Lamberti developed an easier and relatively inexpensive process to manufacture a synthetic compound to replace the fatty acids in bar soap, which was considered a breakthrough in the development of synthetic bar soap. This led to the Dove beauty bar, which Lever Brothers marketed as being less irritating to the skin than traditional soaps. Other brands Lamberti helped develop or improve include Wisk and Aim toothpaste.

Lamberti was an opponent of animal testing, and did not participate in that practice.

Lamberti accumulated a total of 118 granted patents, in the U.S. and other countries, all of which were property of Lever Brothers. According to Stephen Madison, senior principal scientist with Unilever, of which Lever Brothers was part (and whom Lamberti hired), no one else at Unilever held as many patents. He also wrote over 2,000 patents for other inventors all over the world.

== Personal life ==
Lamberti lived in Upper Saddle River, New Jersey. He died on March 21, 2014, of congestive heart failure, at the age of 86. He was survived by his wife of 64 years, Ileana, their children, Vincent James and Laana Peters, and four grandsons, William, Dylan, Morgan, and Dylan.
