= Ramona Pringle =

Canadian journalist, producer and actress

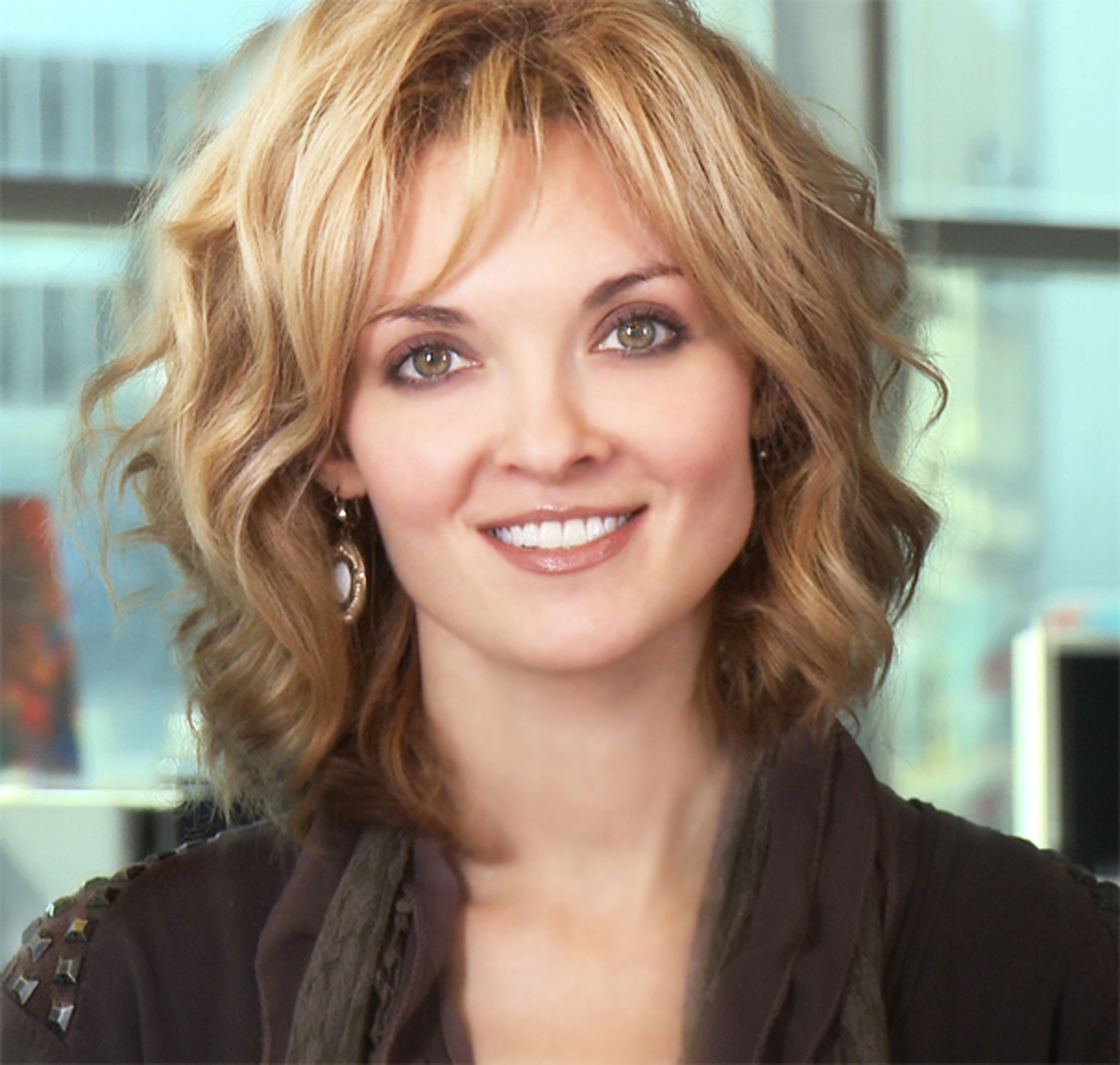
- Born: March 2, 1982 (age 44); Toronto, Ontario, Canada
- Education: York University (BFA); New York University (MPS)
- Occupations: Producer; video artist; host; actress; documentarian; lecturer; professor
- Website: ramonapringle.com

Ramona Pringle is a Canadian digital journalist, television host, multiplatform media producer, actress and professor. Currently she is the Director of the Transmedia Zone at Toronto Metropolitan University, an incubator for innovation in media, and a Technology Columnist for CBC.

Ramona heads a production company in Canada that specializes in multiplatform content and digital topics. She is the producer of Rdigitalife.com and of Avatar Secrets, an interactive documentary for TVO.

== Biography ==
Born in Toronto, she was named after the Ramones by her punk rock parents, Michaele Jordana and Douglas Pringle. Ramona started her career doing a series of international commercials for Ricola, where she played Heidi which quickly developed a fan following online, and made Pringle instantly recognizable as "The Ricola Girl". She was discovered for the campaign by the director Simon West.

As an actress Pringle has worked with mainstream artists Russell Crowe, Ron Howard, Anjelica Huston, Andie MacDowell, Justin Timberlake, Paul Giamatti, and Clive Owen. Credits like the Ricola Campaign and New Line Cinema's Shoot 'em Up and her role as "muse" in Michaele Jordana's CYBORG series have earned Ramona a cult following online.

Pringle is the host of Rdigitalife and has been a recurring host of the web cast of Idea City. Previously she also hosted The X, CBC Television's flagship program for teens where she interviewed bands, celebrities, athletes and writers in Toronto and Los Angeles.

Ramona Pringle has a BFA Honors degree in Film and Video from York University in Toronto, Canada, and a Master's degree in Interactive Media from NYU's Interactive Telecommunications Program, in New York, where she developed multiplatform, interactive projects including the Alternate Reality Game (ARG) "Social Life NY", the multi-channel installation "Ballerina Remix" exhibited at the New York Hall of Science, and her thesis "Paranoia: Emotional Perception in the Interactive Cinematic Experience”. As a multimedia artist, Ramona has produced and conceptualized several large scale immersive installations including Winter Sky at Sherway Gardens and The Media Tree at Casino Niagara, as well as her interactive documentary remix installation which was presented during Nuit Blanche 2012 in Toronto, and allowed users to become part of the live documentary and shape the narrative as it unfolded.

She taught film and acting at NYU's Tisch School of the Arts before joining Ryerson University (now Toronto Metropolitan University) where she is a New Media faculty member in the RTA School of Media and the Master's in Digital Media. She is a member of the Transmedia Center and an advisor to the Digital Media Zone.

As an Interactive Media Producer, she splits her time between Toronto and New York, working with the Ramona Pringle Productions and the PeakMedia Collective. Previously she worked on the PBS Frontline program "Digital Nation" with Douglas Rushkoff, where she has developed "Your Stories" a portal for user-generated content and participatory media about life in the digital age, a forefront multiplatform documentary project. A multiplatform producer examining the virtual world, her project Avatar Secrets chronicles her journey into World of Warcraft in search of real world wisdom was featured in the New York Times, and presented at SXSW where she shared her story and lessons learned.

Pringle's creative and scholarly work focuses on the relationship between humans and technology, and fostering a conversation about technology that has less to do with gadgets and apps and more to do with people. Her work features interviews with Ray Kurzweil, Vint Cerf, Sherry Turkle, Clay Shirky, Marvin Ammori and countless others. Her work also looks at the relationship between storytelling, art, technology and innovation, and the role of interdisciplinarity in forecasting the future. She has spoken at conferences including SXSW, NXNE, the National Association of Media Literacy, and the World Future Society and has been featured in Mashable, The New York Times, Huffington Post, the Toronto Star and on CTV.

Ramona was named one of the "10 to Watch" for 2013 by Playback magazine.

== Filmography ==
- Murdoch Mysteries (2011)
- Degrassi: The Next Generation (2008)
- Shoot 'Em Up (2007)
- Skinwalkers (2006)
- Firehouse Dog (2006)
- "Monday Report"
- Cinderella Man (2005)
- Riding the Bus with My Sister (2005)
- The X (2005)
- Mutant X, episode: "Dream Lover" (2004)
- Blue Murder, episode: "Boy Band" (2003)
- On the Line (2001)
- Doc, episode: "Face in the Mirror" (2001)
- Model Behavior (2000)
