= Free Being Me =

Children's educational programme in body confidence

Free Being Me is an educational initiative from the World Association of Girl Guides and Girl Scouts, supported by Unilever's Dove Self-Esteem Fund, established in 2013, which encourages a positive body image and self esteem,

The programme aims to strengthen children's body confidence and self-esteem through interactive activities, designed by experts in body confidence. The programme has reached over 6 million girls and boys from over 101 countries since 2014.

== Free Being Me Activity Packs ==
The Free Being Me activity packs, targeted at 7-10 and 11-14 years olds are available in 18 languages and can be downloaded freely in English, French, Spanish and Arabic from the group's website.

During Free Being Me sessions girls learn to stand up to social pressures, value their bodies and challenge beauty stereotypes promoted in the media. Girls also have the opportunity to do a 'Take Action' project where they engage with others to pass on the body confidence message, promoting a healthy body image to their friends and community.

== Programme in the UK ==
Free Being Me is run through the Peer Education programme in the UK(Previously known as "4"). Girls aged 16-25 attend Regional or National training where they are trained to deliver sessions on the Free Being Me topic to girls. The sessions are designed to cover Brownies (age 7-10) and Guides (age 10-16). There is not currently a programme for older girls.

The programme is delivered over 2 or 3 sessions typically lasting 90 minutes each. The initial session covers "What is the Body Myth" with the second session covering "Breaking the Body Myth". Girls can choose to take the activities further and spread the message of what they have learned on body image to other girls, by doing so they can earn the Free Being Me badge.
