= Caroline Lesley =

American-Canadian actor & host

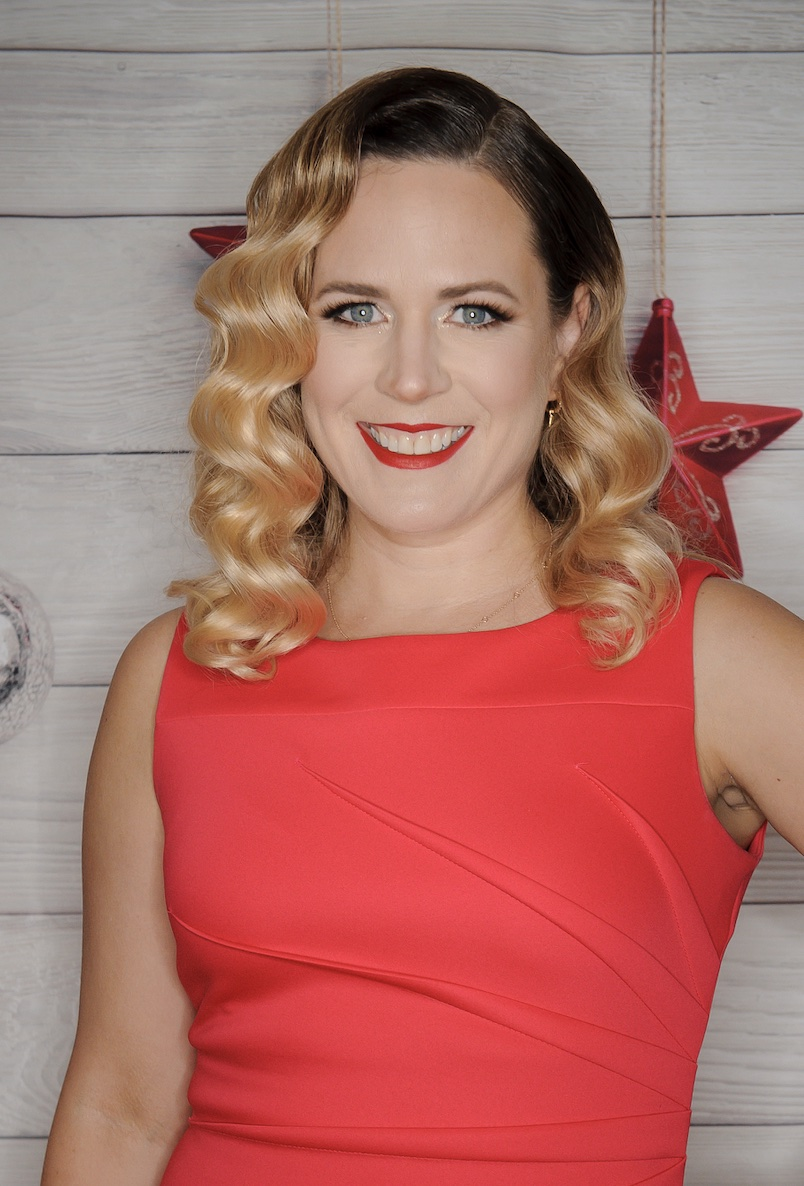
- Born: Toronto, Ontario, Canada
- Education: Ryerson University
- Occupation: Actor

Caroline Lesley is an American-Canadian actor and host.

Caroline is currently the co-host, co-founder & executive producer of Ticker Take with Jon Erlichman on YouTube.

She had a role in the movie Fruitvale Station which won the Grand Jury and Audience Awards at Sundance Film Festival, and the Future Award at Cannes Film Festival.

Lesley's recent work includes roles on FX on Hulu series Y: The Last Man (TV series), Amazon Studios series The Boys, National Geographic Channel show Air Crash Investigation (TV series), Metro-Goldwyn-Mayer show Condor (TV series), Ion Television series Private Eyes (TV series).

Lesley performed at the Upright Citizens Brigade Theatre (UCB) in New York City, and The Groundlings in Los Angeles.

Lesley guest-starred on the satire TV series The Onion News Network on Independent Film Channel.

Her one-woman show, Doppelganger Joe, premiered at the New York International Fringe Festival.

Lesley co-created Periscope's first TV Channel, Parachute TV. Parachute TV won the Digital Entertainment World startup award.

== Hosting work ==
Caroline was a red carpet correspondent and celebrity interviewer for Entertainment Weekly. She has interviewed hundreds of celebrities, including Al Gore, Brad Pitt and Kate Winslet.

She performed one-on-one celebrity sit-down interviews and covered red carpets for EW parties, film festivals (including Sundance and Toronto International Film Festival) and Emmy and Oscar events.

Caroline was the official Periscope live-streaming red carpet Daytime Emmy host for the 2016 Daytime Emmy Awards.

Lesley covered the red carpet for the opening of Billy Elliot on Broadway and appeared in the Finding Billy documentary produced by Universal Pictures with Elton John.

She also covered the Tony Awards.

Caroline was a host on the Canadian Broadcasting Corporation television series The X.

She hosted several YouTube shows called "Simple Do's and Don'ts", "The Captain Humphrey's Project", and created the comedic mom show "Eating My Cake Too."

She created a weekly show on Parachute TV called "Puppet's Place" that she hosted and voiced the puppet.

== Early life ==
Caroline attended the Ryerson Theatre School in Toronto, where she received her BFA with honors.

She played Queen Isabella in her graduate production of Richard II directed by John Neville.

== Career ==
=== Early career ===
She was a guest host on Toronto's urban FLOW 93.5 radio (where she was also a copywriter) and she lent her voice to numerous radio and TV commercials.

Lesley continued her work in theater and performed improv shows in Ontario with the Canadian Improv Showcase.

She also appeared in shows at the Summerworks Festival in Toronto and the Toronto Fringe Festival.

She starred in 13 episodes of Rogers Cable improv show The Canadian Improv Showcase.

She performed in the play In Between at the Centre for the Arts in Toronto. Caroline received rave reviews for her role as Wendy, a neurotic misfit, trying to find her place.

She guest-starred on Soul Food on Showtime and BET.

She also appeared in a number of short films and TV commercials, including Bud Light, Bell Canada, and TJ Maxx.

=== Voice work ===
Lesley was the voice of Yoplait and is the voice of the little boy Kam Kamazaki on Medabots, an anime television series. She is the voice of Lidda on the Dungeons & Dragons movie: Scourge of Worlds.

Caroline was also the sultry intermission voice on early episodes of The Starters when it was known as the Basketball Jones podcast.

=== Other work ===
Caroline filmed a television pilot with Eddie Steeples in Los Angeles.

Lesley did several episodes of the CBS daytime soap opera As the World Turns

She starred in the indie film: Sister Blister in New York City and jumped out of a plane for the role.

Lesley appeared in a TV commercial for Anderson Cooper's daytime talk show: Anderson.

She wrote, produced, and directed her own short film, Audio Guide, which screened at the NYC Downtown Short Film Festival and the Long Island International Film Festival.

She has several sketch comedy videos on Funny or Die and appeared in sketches for Details.com and EW.com.

Lesley was the face of Farmland Dairies milk ad seen in Shape and on billboards across New York City and New Jersey.

She released a single called The Rainbow.

== Filmography ==
Year	Title
2018	Condor (TV series)
2019	Private Eyes (TV series)
2020	The Boys
