= Michaele Jordana =

Canadian artist

- Born: Michaele Jordana Berman; 1947 (age 78–79); Winnipeg, Manitoba
- Education: B.F.A. University of Manitoba School of Art (1969)
- Spouse: Douglas Pringle

Michaele Jordana, whose birth name was Michaele Berman, (born 1947 in Winnipeg, Manitoba) is a Canadian artist and musician. She began her career in the 1970s as a super-realist painter of life-size airbrush paintings of slaughtered whales.

== Career ==
After graduating from the University of Manitoba School of Art with her BFA in 1969, Jordana started her career in the 1970s as a super-realist painter of life-size airbrush paintings of slaughtered whales in Northern Canada. Her first show in 1976, Oceans of Blood, was exhibited at the Isaacs Gallery in Toronto, Ontario, as was her show in 1977, Carnivore. Through these works, she meant the viewer to sense her feeling of involvement with the destiny of the whales and the extermination of these animals, as she was quoted as saying in an article in the Toronto Star, "Provocative Whale Paintings Point Out Artist's Obsession", January 14, 1976. These works are in the collections of the National Gallery of Canada, the Canada Council Art Bank, and the Robert McLaughlin Gallery in Oshawa.

The Rites of Nuliajuk (1977), performed at different places in Ontario, including the Robert McLaughin Gallery, marked the beginning of her crossover from fine artist to musician. Collaborating with her partner Douglas Pringle and their production company Peak Productions, Berman started composing music and creating the on-stage persona of Michaele Jordana. With her band, The Poles, Jordana became known in the new wave movement. With their hit single "CN Tower" (1977), The Poles won the first U-Know Award, and were regulars at punk venues including Max's Kansas City, the El Mocambo, and CBGB, where they played alongside Devo and the Ramones.

In the 1980s, Jordana Berman directed and produced the documentaries Moving with the Light and Face to Face which pioneered assistive technologies for down-syndrome youth to communicate through the introduction of art, light and colored gels. Her stage show Storming Heaven, a rock opera which cast a dystopian glance at the realities of animal testing, was presented at the DuMaurier Center in Toronto and toured to the United States.

In the mid-1990s, Jordana started applying photorealistism to digital art and design, and together with Pringle started integrating new media platforms into their work, producing music art and video for the web. By 2000, Peak Productions had evolved into the Peak Media Collective, a collective of art workers, working independently and collaborating on large-scale public installations.

Jordana is also an art educator and has taught courses in visual art throughout her career at institutions including the art schools of York University (1975–1976), the University of Guelph (1977), and the University of Ontario Institute of Technology, where she developed and taught drawing for animators and gameworlds for game designers. Jordana also has been professor and coordinator of the program in digital animation and game design and development at Centennial College's Centre for Creative Communication.

== Private life ==
Jordana took a leave-of-absence from the world of new wave music to have a child, Ramona Pringle.
