= Anita Hegh =

Australian actress

- Born: Australia
- Education: National Institute of Dramatic Art
- Occupation: Actress
- Years active: 1994–present
- Known for: Stingers, Janet King

Anita Hegh is an Australian actress, known for starring in the television series Stingers, Janet King, and Total Control.

== Early life and education ==
Hegh was raised in Willoughby, New South Wales. She studied to be a teacher at Sydney University, where she joined the Sydney University Dramatic Society. After auditioning for and being accepted into the National Institute of Dramatic Art, in Sydney, she changed her career path. Hegh studied drama at the National Institute of Dramatic Art, graduating in 1994.

== Career ==
After minor roles in Così (1996), Paradise Road (1997) and the children's television series Return to Jupiter, Hegh became well-known starring as Ellen 'Mac' Mackenzie on Stingers.

In June 2002, she posed nude for Black+White magazine.

Hegh received an Australian Film Institute Award for Best Actress in a Supporting Role, for her work in MDA. Other television credits include Last Man Standing, Valentine's Day, The Informant, Carlotta, Deep Water, My Place, McLeod's Daughters, Rescue Special Ops and Time of our Lives. She played a major role in two series of Janet King as Janet's colleague and lesbian lover, Bianca Grieve.

Her film credits include Stuffed, Maiden and Last Ride with Hugo Weaving.

Hegh works extensively in theatre. She won both a Helpmann and Sydney Theatre Award for The Wild Duck at Belvoir Street Theatre. She also won a Sydney theatre award for The City at the Sydney Theatre Company.

In 2017, after completing the second season of Janet King for the ABC, Hegh worked for the Sydney Theatre Company in Cloud Nine and also The Father (touring Melbourne Theatre Company) in 2017.

She won the 2018 Helpmann Award for Best Female Actor in a Supporting Role in a Play for her role in The Resistible Rise of Arturo Ui.

In 2019 Hegh was announced as part of the cast for ABC political drama Total Control. Hegh would reprise the role for the third and final season in 2024. Hegh in 2022 appeared in ABC movie Here Out West. On 18 November 2024, it was announced that Hegh would appear in the final season of Stan series Bump.

== Filmography ==
=== Film ===
Year	TItle	Role	Note	Ref
1996	Cosi	Waitress	Feature film	
1997	Paradise Road	Bett	Feature film	
2003	The Forest	Ashley	TV movie	
2004	Loot	Cynthia Allen	TV movie	
2008	The Informant	Christine Button	TV movie	
2008	Scorched	Linda	TV movie	
2008	Valentine's Day	Sarah Hayes	TV movie	
2009	Last Ride	Maryanne	Feature film	
2009	The Diplomat	Annabelle	TV movie	
2012	My Mind's Own Melody	Jude	Short film	
2013	Maiden	Kate	Short film	
2014	Stuffed	Ellen	Short film	
2014	The Killing Field	Diedre Hughes	TV movie	
2015	Legacy	Jocelyn	Short film	
2018	Dots	Barbara	Short film	
2020	I Met a Girl	Patricia	Feature film	
2021	We Have Me	Mum	Short film	
2022	Here Out West	Sharon		
2025	Spit	Anita Garland		
2025	Bump: A Christmas Film	Edith Chalmers		

=== Television ===
Year	TItle	Role	Note	Ref
1997	State Coroner	Jody Zelco	TV series, 1 episode	
1997	Return to Jupiter	Samanther	TV series, 13 episodes	
1998	Wildside	Jane Gilham	TV series, 2 episodes	
1998	Water Rats	Sally Bates	TV series, 1 episode	
1998-02	Stingers	Ellen 'Mac' Mackenzie	TV series, 110 episodes	
2005	MDA	Julia Delvecchio	TV series, 4 episodes	
2005	Last Man Standing	Marly Logan	TV series, 6 episodes	
2005	Holly's Heroes	Dana	TV series, 1 episode	
2008	McLeod's Daughters	Sharon Buckingham	TV series, 2 episodes	
2009	Rogue Nation	Young Elizabeth Macarthur	TV series, 1 episode	
2009	Darwin's Brave New World	Caroline Darwin	TV miniseries, 3 episodes	
2009	My Place	Emma	TV series, 1 episode	
2010	Rescue: Special Ops	Melissa Gardner	TV series, 1 episode	
2014	Carlotta	Evelyn Byron	TV miniseries	
2014	The Moodys	Hazel	TV series, 2 episodes	
2014	The Doctor Blake Mysteries	Susan Wouton	TV series, 1 episode	
2013-14	The Time of our Lives	Maryanne	TV series, 13 episodes	
2015	Catching Milat	Alison Small	TV miniseries, 2 episodes	
2016	Home and Away	Claire Lewis	TV series, 6 episodes	
2016	VR Noir	Veronica Coltrane	Video Game	
2016	Deep Water	Cheryl Hampton	TV series, 3 episodes	
2016-17	Janet King	Bianca Grieve	TV series, 16 episodes	
2017	High Life	Maggie Turner	TV series, 6 episodes	
2014-20	Black Comedy	Guest Cast	TV series, 5 episodes	
2022	Pieces of Her	Cable Host	TV series, 1 episode	
2022	Joe vs. Carole		TV miniseries, 1 episode	
2022	Irreverent	Charmaine	TV miniseries, 3 episodes	
2022	Upright	Chrysanthe	TV series. 2 episodes	
2022	Pieces of Her	Cable Host	TV series, 1 episode	
2021-24	Bump	Edith Chalmers	TV series, 24 episodes	
2023	In Limbo	Detective Blythe	TV series, 1 episode	
2023	In Our Blood	Clara Jones	TV series, 1 episode	
2021, 2024	Total Control	Helena Rossi	TV series, 10 episodes	
2026	Two Years Later	Sharon	TV series: 2 episodes	
