= Phillip Schuler =

Australian journalist and war correspondent

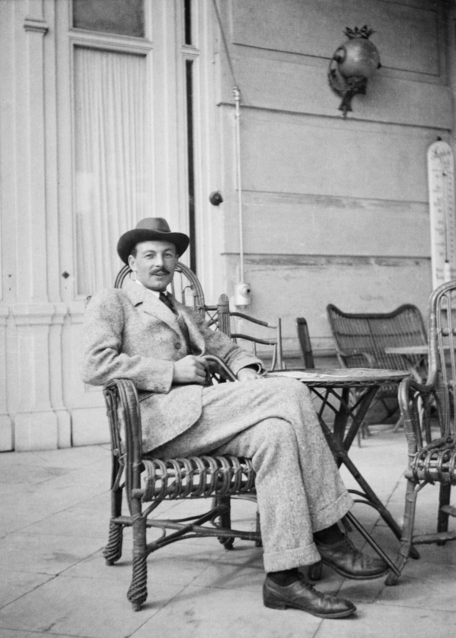
Schuler c. 1915, possibly in Cairo

Phillip Frederick Edward Schuler (c. August 1893 – 23 June 1917) was an Australian journalist, a war correspondent at the Gallipoli campaign. He later joined the army, was wounded in action, and died in France.

== History ==
Schuler was born in East Melbourne, the only son of G. F. H. Schuler (23 February 1853 – 11 December 1926), longtime editor of the Melbourne Age.

He was appointed war correspondent for The Age and was on board HMAS Melbourne during the engagement of her sister ship Sydney against Emden on 9 November 1914, and on General Bridges' flagship Orvieto during the assault on Gallipoli in April 1915 and at Mena Camp, developing a friendship with Charles Bean, who remembered "Peter" Schuler with admiration.

He enlisted in Belgium in April 1916, transferred to catering corps, promoted to lieutenant in May 1917, and was responsible for some innovations that made army food more palatable. He was wounded in Belgium and died at the 2nd Australian Casualty Clearing Station, France, on 23 June 1917. His remains were interred at Trois Arbres Cemetery, Steenwerck, Plot 1, Row S, Grave 43.

Bean wrote:

All his friends knew him as a brilliantly handsome, bright, attractive, generous youngster that he was. But I had the opportunity of knowing him as a war correspondent . . . he worked harder than almost any other war correspondent I ever knew. He wrote only what he saw. His letters were true, and only those who know what oceans of false stuff have been poured on to the world in this war can appreciate, what that means. [He] came to Galiipoli during the summer as correspondent of the Age, and his stay there covered all the heaviest fighting of August. He followed that fighting quite fearlessly, and more closely than I think any war correspondent in this war. From early morning of August 7th, when he went out with the 4th Brigade on the left, he climbed the hills daily, as active as a young panther. His power of taking in the whole situation by a survey of the movements on the hills would have made him a brilliant intelligence officer. The reports which he brought back from his rambles were fuller than the official news and truer, and his history of Anzac will always remain the classic for that period on that account. He was a boy of delicate almost, fastidious tastes: fond of flowers, scrupulously neat, even under conditions of discomfort. But his bravery and energy crowded his short stay at Anzac with such experience, as has rarely been gained by journalists, and he held the honor of Australian journalism very high.

== Personal ==
He was engaged in 1911 to socialite Joan Dolores Innes-Noad of "Avoca", Darling Point, New South Wales. No reference to a marriage has been found.

== In popular culture ==
Sam Worthington played the part of "Phillip Schuler" in the two-part miniseries Deadline Gallipoli.

== Publications ==
- Australia in Arms (1916) on the Gallipoli campaign.
  - A paperback edition has recently been published: Phillip Paton (2014). Australia in Arms. Penguin. ISBN 9781743483848.
