= Luke Eve =

Australian screen director and producer (born 1974)

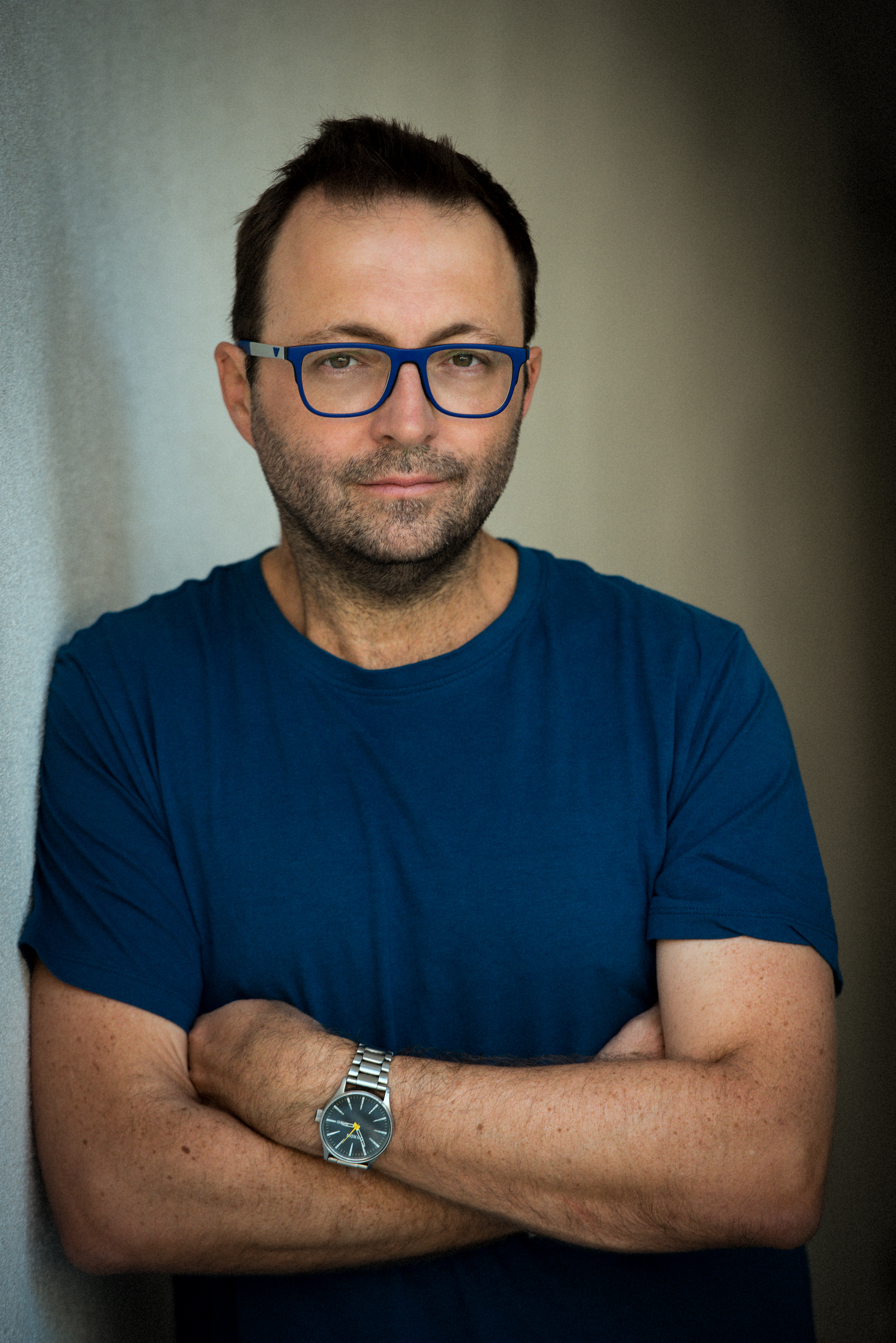
- Eve in 2020
- Born: Sydney, Australia
- Occupations: Screen director, producer
- Known for: Low Life, High Life, I Met A Girl
- Website: www.moresauce.com.au

Luke Eve is an Australian screen director and producer. He is known for his web series Low Life and High Life and for the 2020 feature film I Met A Girl.

== Early life and education ==
Born in Sydney, Australia, Eve was raised on a farm in Sydney's outer west. After graduating from high school, he started several degrees before moving to the UK, where he spent four years backpacking around Europe and the rest of the world. During this time he developed a love for photography.

Returning to Australia in 1999, he completed a Visual Communications Degree specialising in Photography and Design followed by a Master of Arts from the Australian Film, Television and Radio School, finishing his degree with an internship in New York City for This is That Productions in 2005.

== Career ==
Eve began his career as a freelance photographer working with many unsigned Sydney bands in the early 2000s. Originally a freelance photographer, Luke Eve transitioned into directing music videos and commercials before moving into film and television.

Shortly after he began directing, he launched his own production company, More Sauce. Eve went on to direct dozens of music videos for Australian bands, including Faker, Damien Leith, Small Mercies, Cosima De Vito, and Nikki Webster. He was nominated for an IF Award for his multiple-award-winning music video for The Hot Lies' Emergency! Emergency!

In 2005, Eve won Tropfest with his third short film, Australian Summer.

In 2009, Eve directed his fourth short film, Man’s Best Friend. He also directed his first television series, Dave in the Life, for CJZ Productions and SBS Television Australia.

The following year, Eve directed and produced Cockroach, a 14-minute visual-effects-loaded short film starring Damon Gameau that has gone on to screen at over 30 international film festivals and won over a dozen awards.

In 2011, Eve completed work on his second TV series for SBS, SEX: An Unnatural History, produced by Matchbox Pictures and hosted by Julia Zemiro.

In 2012, Eve was the series director of the landmark documentary series Great Southern Land for ABC Television and CJZ Productions.

In 2014, he created, produced, and directed the critically-acclaimed web series Low Life, a black comedy about depression starring Henry Nixon and Claire van der Boom.

In 2014, Eve directed two episodes of Julia Zemiro's Home Delivery for CJZ Productions and ABC Television.

In 2017 Eve directed and produced the follow-up /companion series to Low Life, High Life, which was executive produced by Stephen Fry and stars Odessa Young, with music by Sarah Blasko.

In 2019 Eve completed production on his debut feature film, I Met A Girl, starring Brenton Thwaites and Lily Sullivan, in the United States. The film had its world premiere at the 25th Busan International Film Festival in October 2020, followed by a worldwide release.

During the COVID-19 pandemic in Australia, Eve, alongside María Albiñana, created, produced, directed, and acted in one of the world's first multi-national lockdown series, CANCELLED. The series, which was produced in Australia, Spain, and Argentina, launched on Facebook Watch.

== Awards and nominations ==
Eve was the winner of Tropfest 2005 with his short film Australian Summer.

Great Southern Land garnered Eve an Australian Directors' Guild nomination for Best Direction in a Documentary Series.

Low Life received a number of online awards, including the Grand Jury Prize at Melbourne Web Fest and Best Direction at the Australian Online Video Awards.

== Personal life ==
Eve is an advocate of mental health awareness.

== Filmography ==
Film

Year	Title	Role(s)
2001	Karaoke	Producer, Director
2004	The Mime Artist	Writer, Producer, Director
2005	Australian Summer	Producer, Director
2009	Man's Best Friend	Producer, Director
2010	Cockroach	Producer, Director
2020	I Met A Girl	Director, Executive Producer

TV

Year	Title	Role(s)
2009	Dave in the Life	Director
2011	SEX: An Unnatural History	Series Director
2012	Great Southern Land	Series Director
2014	Low Life	Series Director
2014	Julia Zemiro's Home Delivery	Director
2017	High Life	Director, Co-Creator, Co-Producer
2020	Cancelled	Director, Co-Creator, Co-Producer
