= Farmed and Dangerous =

- Genre: Satirical comedy; TV commercial
- Written by: Tim Piper (Timothy David); Daniel M. Rosenberg; Mike Dieffenbach; Jeremy Pikser
- Starring: John Sloan; Ray Wise; Karynn Moore; Thomas Mikusz
- Theme music composer: Ali Dee Theodore
- Country of origin: United States
- Original language: English
- No. of seasons: 1
- No. of episodes: 4

Production
- Executive producers: Mark Crumpacker; Tim Piper (Timothy David); Daniel M. Rosenberg
- Producer: Natalie Galazka
- Cinematography: Marc Laliberté
- Editor: Ross Baldisserotto
- Running time: 4 x 30 min
- Production company: Piro

Original release
- Network: Hulu
- Release: February 17 – March 10, 2014

Farmed and Dangerous is a 2014 four-part satirical comedy webseries from Chipotle Mexican Grill, a chain of casual restaurants selling Mexican food. It was created partly as part of a marketing campaign, but barely features Chipotle; instead, it satirises "Big Ag" and "Big Food" practices, and informs people about how their food is produced. The series is co-produced by Piro.

== Synopsis ==
The series is a satire of "Big Ag" and "Big Food" practices, featuring the fictional megacorporation Animoil feeding cows "petropellets". The pellets are made from petroleum directly rather than indirectly, from the corn and soybean that require so much petroleum products to grow. The protagonist is Chip Randolph, an activist and organic farmer who tries to expose the unethical practices.

Along with the webisodes, people are also invited to play trivia based on each episode via their phone to win prizes from Chipotle.

== Webisodes ==
The series consists of four 30-minute episodes.

1. Oiling the Food Chain – February 17, 2014
2. Passing the Buck – February 24, 2014
3. Raising the Steaks – March 3, 2014
4. Ends Meat – March 10, 2014

== Cast and characters ==
- John Sloan as Chip Randolph: A free-range cattle farmer and the head of the Sustainable Family Farming Association. He publicizes a video of a cow exploding after consuming petropellets, he is then targeted by Marshall and his crew in an attempt to remove the video from the internet, refute its authenticity, and prosecute Randell as well as other food activists.
- Ray Wise as Buck Marshall: The head of a consulting public relations firm for Animoil called the Industrial Food Image Bureau (I.F.I.B.), he is tasked with maintaining and repairing the public image of both the company, and its new product: the petropellet. In addition to heading up the PR of Animoil, he is also their chief spokesperson; appearing in their advertisements and public statements. Marshall and the I.F.I.B. were also tasked with getting a tax break for a company that specializes in producing industrial pesticide to combat weeds so that they can develop a new pesticide (Agent Banana) to combat the new 'Super Pigweed' that has developed as a result of the older weeds growing more resistant to the pesticides.
- Karynn Moore as Sophia Marshall: The daughter of Buck, she is given a job at I.F.I.B. by her father and is tasked with seducing Chip Randell after he surfaces and to speak publicly in favor of Animoil and the petropellet. However, through this endeavor she learns about the sustainable food movement and begins to change her views.
- Thomas Mikusz as Dr. van Riefkind: A German speaking food scientist from Austria. He was responsible for the development and testing of Animoil's new products. He created petropellet, as well as a number of other things including an eight-winged chicken. It is also presumable that he created the 'petrochicken' that appears in Episode 2 that burns when placed on the grill.

== Production ==
The series was co-produced by Chipotle Mexican Grill and the New York-based production company Piro, co-owned by producer Daniel M. Rosenberg. Rosenberg and co-owner of Piro, director Tim Piper (a.k.a. Timothy David), wrote the script. It took two years to make.

The series is part of an unconventional Chipotle marketing campaign to make people think about the origins of their food.

Although the series was commissioned and funded by Chipotle, and their executives consulted on and approved the script, the company hardly makes an appearance in the series. It only appears twice, both times as part of jokes. Chris Arnold, Chipotle communications director, said that they believed "the more people are informed about their food, the more they will want to make healthy choices like eating at Chipotle".

== Release ==
Farmed and Dangerous was released on Hulu across four webisodes from February 17, 2014.

== Reception and impact ==
Boulder Weekly described the series as "part espionage drama, part sitcom, part love story", and praised it as "as well-produced as just about anything you'll see on cable TV, with slick cinematography and quality actors".

Some agricultural groups criticized the series as unrealistic.

The New York Times reported third-party research showing that Farmed and Dangerous was more influential in changing audience behavior than 98 percent of films and TV shows of recent years that were made to have social impact (including An Inconvenient Truth and other well-known films).

== See also ==
- Intensive farming
