= Joel Jackson =

Australian actor and musician

- Born: Albany, Western Australia, Australia
- Occupation: Actor
- Years active: 2015–present
- Website: www.joeljacksonofficial.com

Joel Jackson is an Australian actor and musician. He came to prominence for his performances as Charles Bean in Deadline Gallipoli and Peter Allen in Peter Allen: Not the Boy Next Door (both in 2015). For both roles he was nominated for the 2015 AACTA Award for Best Lead Actor in a Television Drama, winning for Peter Allen. In 2019 he co-starred as Detective James Steed in Ms. Fisher's Modern Murder Mysteries.

== Early life and education ==
Joel Jackson was born in Albany, Western Australia. When he was 10, his family moved nearly 2,000 km (1,200 mi) north to Karratha after his father was offered a job as the primary school principal. He became head boy at Karratha Senior High School. At 17, Jackson went on a year-long Rotary exchange to Brazil.

Jackson initially wanted to pursue a musical career. He first began playing guitar at age 14 and supported Birds of Tokyo, Megan Washington, Diesel and Ian Moss in Karratha.

In 2011, Jackson moved to Sydney to join National Institute of Dramatic Art (NIDA). He graduated from NIDA in 2013 and returned to the metalwork factories and engineering workshops of Karratha.

== Career ==
In 2014, Jackson auditioned for a single scene role in the mini-series Deadline Gallipoli but was later offered the lead part of Charles Bean alongside Sam Worthington, which aired on Foxtel's Showcase in April 2015.

In September 2015, Jackson starred as Peter Allen in the 2-part mini-series of his life, Peter Allen : Not the Boy Next Door. In December 2015, at the Australian Academy of Cinema and Television Arts Awards, Jackson won best lead actor in a television drama for his role as Allen. In May 2016, at the 58th Annual Logie Awards, he won Most Outstanding Newcomer for the role.

In February 2017, Jackson starred alongside Heidi Arena in Melbourne Theatre Company's performance of Born Yesterday.

In December 2018, Jackson released season one of his podcast The Good Thief in which he interviews some of Australians including Jack Ellis, Anna McGahan, Glendon Ivan, and Samuel Johnson.

In 2019, Jackson plays Detective James Steed in Ms Fisher's Modern Murder Mysteries. The same year, he played alongside Harry Potter’s Miriam Margolyes, and Australian actors Richard Roxburgh and Deborah Mailman, in the role of Rich Uncle Brian in H Is for Happiness.

In 2023, Jackson was named as part of the cast for the film Kangaroo Island

== Filmography ==
=== Film ===
Year	Title	Role	Notes
2015	What We Know	Matt	Short film
2017	Jungle	Markus Stamm	Feature film
2017	Stranger	Stranger	Short film
2018	The Hunted	Mac	Short film
2019	H Is for Happiness	Rich Uncle Brian	Feature film
2020	I Met a Girl	Nick Cassidy	Feature film
2023	Raising Thunder	William	Short film
2024	Runt	Duncan Bayleaf	
2024	Kangaroo Island	Ben Roberts	
2024	Just a Farmer	Alec	
TBA	Psyche	TBA	Post-production
TBA	Play Dead	TBA	Post-production

=== Television ===
Year	Title	Role	Notes
2015	Deadline Gallipoli	Charles Bean	Mini-series
2015	Peter Allen: Not the Boy Next Door	Peter Allen	Mini-series
2016	Hyde & Seek	Lachlan Ford	Mini-series
2017	The Wrong Girl	Liam Johnson	4 episodes
2018	Safe Harbour	Damien Pascoe	Mini-series
2019-2021	Ms Fisher's Modern Murder Mysteries	Detective James Steed	Series regular
2020	Mystery Road	McBride	3 episodes
2023	The Claremont Murders	Paul Yovich	1 episode
2025	Scrublands: Silver	Garth McGrath	1 episode

== Theatre ==
Year	Title	Role	Notes
2014	Bite Me		ATYP Studio 1, Wharf Theatre
2017	Born Yesterday	Paul Verrall	Southbank Theatre with Melbourne Theatre Company

== Awards and nominations ==
Year	Award	Category	Work	Result
2015	AACTA Awards	Best Lead Actor in a Television Drama	Peter Allen: Not the Boy Next Door	Won
2015	AACTA Awards	Best Lead Actor in a Television Drama	Deadline Gallipoli	Nominated
2016	Logie Awards	Most Outstanding Newcomer	Peter Allen: Not the Boy Next Door	Won
2016	Logie Awards	Most Outstanding Newcomer	Deadline Gallipoli	Nominated
2016	Logie Awards	Most Popular New Talent	—N/a	Nominated
