= Dove Campaign for Real Beauty =

Marketing campaign

The Dove Campaign for Real Beauty is a marketing campaign which focuses on building self-confidence in women and children. Launched by Unilever in 2004, Dove's partners in the campaign include Ogilvy, Edelman, and Harbinger Capital. Part of the overall project was the Evolution campaign.

== Campaign ==
In 2004, Dove and Ogilvy organized a photography exhibit titled "Beyond Compare: Women Photographers on Real Beauty". The show featured work from 67 female photographers which led to the Real Beauty campaign. The Dove Real Beauty campaign was conceived in 2004 during a three-year creative strategic research effort, conducted in partnership with three universities, led by Joah Santos. The creative was conceived by Ogilvy Düsseldorf and London. The original advertising research indicated that only 4% of women consider themselves beautiful.

The first stage of the campaign centered on a series of billboard advertisements, initially put up in Germany and United Kingdom. The spots showcased photographs of regular women (in place of professional models), taken by noted portrait photographer Rankin. The ads invited passersby to vote on whether a particular model was, for example, "Fat or Fab" or "Wrinkled or Wonderful", with the results of the votes dynamically updated and displayed on the billboard itself. Accompanying the billboard advertisements was the publication of the "Dove Report", a corporate study. The creatives in charge of the shoot and original concept were Jacqueline Leak and Debra Fried from Ogilvy, New York.

According to Ad Age, the campaign successfully increased sales of Dove soap from $2 billion to $4 billion in three years. The series received significant media coverage, generating exposure that Unilever estimated to be worth more than 30 times the paid-for media space. Following this, the campaign expanded with a series of television spots, culminating in the 2006 Little Girls global campaign, which featured regional versions of the same advertisement in both print and screen, Unilever purchased a 30-second spot during Super Bowl XL at an estimated cost of $2.5 million for the Little Girls campaign.

In 2006, Daughters was released, which consisted of filmed interviews about how mothers and daughters related to modern perceptions of beauty and the beauty industry. Dove's Self-Esteem Fund released statistics to support the idea that young women and girls are likelier to have distorted views of beauty. Art director Tim Piper proposed to create Evolution with the budget left over from Daughters). It was designed to get viewers to find the campaign website to watch Daughters and to participate in mother-daughter workshops. After Evolution, Ogilvy produced Onslaught.

In April 2013, a video titled Dove Real Beauty Sketches was released as part of the campaign, created by Hugo Veiga. It went viral, attracting strong reactions from the public and media. In the video, several women describe themselves to a forensic sketch artist who cannot see his subjects. The same women are then described by strangers whom they met the previous day. The sketches are compared, with the stranger's image invariably being both more flattering and more accurate. The differences create strong reactions when shown to the women.

In October 2013, Free Being Me, a collaboration between Dove and the World Association of Girl Guides and Girl Scouts was launched.

In 2017, Dove and Ogilvy London created limited-edition versions of body wash bottles meant to look like different body shapes and sizes. Dove produced 6,800 bottles of the six different designs and sent them to 15 different countries.

In 2023, Dove partnered with Common Sense Media, Lizzo, and ParentsTogether Action to advance revisions of the Kids Online Safety Act, a federal bill that supports design standards and safeguards to protect kids online.

== Reception ==
Critics and defenders have both pointed out that one ad campaign seeking to redefine beauty is unlikely to solve a widespread social problem of women and girls feeling physical insecurities. However, women in the target audience expressed mixed responses. Dr. Carolyn Coker Ross at Psych Central estimated 80 percent of American women feel dissatisfied with their bodies. The National Association of Anorexia Nervosa and Associated Disorders cited a 1991 study estimating 81 percent of 10-year-old girls were afraid of becoming "fat".

The Dove Campaign was one of the first campaigns considered as going "viral", a relatively new phenomenon in 2004. Ad Age ranked the campaign No. 1 in a list of the "Top Ad Campaigns of the 21st Century". Evolution won two Cannes Lions Grand Prix awards. Katy Young at The Daily Telegraph called the Real Beauty Sketches marketing campaign as being "one campaign that will make you think, and hopefully, feel more beautiful." Nina Bahadur at HuffPost interviewed a Dove spokesperson who said Dove seeks to bring more awareness of beauty standards to women of different ages and cultural backgrounds.

Critics, on the other hand, believe that the campaign focuses too greatly on the physical aspect of beauty instead of other forms of self-worth. Ann Friedman of The Cut argued, "These ads still uphold the notion that, when it comes to evaluating ourselves and other women, beauty is paramount. The goal shouldn't be to get women to focus on how we are all gorgeous in our own way. It should be to get women to do for ourselves what we wish the broader culture would do: judge each other based on intelligence and wit and ethical sensibility, not just our faces and bodies." Tanzina Vega at The New York Times interviewed a 24-year-old who noted about the marketing that "at the heart of it all is that beauty is still what defines women. It is a little hypocritical". Erin Keane at Salon argued that Dove was "peddling the same old beauty standards as empowerment".

Others expressed concerns that while Dove portrays their models as unedited and "real", the images have actually been photoshopped to smooth the appearance of the women's skin, hide wrinkles and blemishes, fix stray hairs, etc. Photo retoucher Pascal Dangin of Box Studios told The New Yorker he edited the photos, saying "Do you know how much retouching was on that?" Kate Fridkis at Psychology Today noted that the models were mostly white, thin, and young. Fridkis also criticized Dove for patronizing women about their physical insecurities while being part of an industry that encourages women to find self-worth in their appearances.

The campaign has been criticized on the grounds that Unilever also produces Glow & Lovely, a skin-lightening product marketed at dark-skinned women in several countries. Unilever brand Lynx's advertising campaign contradicted the sentiment of the Campaign for Real Beauty. Moreover, Unilever owns Axe hygiene products, which are marketed to men using overtly sexualized women, and SlimFast diet bars; however, Will Burns at Forbes called such criticism "irrelevant", arguing that consumers would not be able to recognize that these brands shared a parent company.
