= Thomas Mikusz =

Austrian actor (born 1970)

- Mikusz attending German Currents in 2012
- Born: 24 October 1970 (age 55); Vienna, Austria
- Years active: 2004–present

Thomas Mikusz (born 24 October 1970) is an Austrian actor known for his work in television, film, animation, print and video games.

== Career ==
After moving to Los Angeles in 2004 he received initial success with his appearance on the CBS show The Unit. He is recognized in Germany and Austria due to his appearances on the shows EXTRA on RTL and on the talk show Planet Wissen on WDR. His role models include Arnold Schwarzenegger, Armin Müller-Stahl, Ingrid Bergman, Oskar Werner, and Thomas Kretschmann.

In 2011, Thomas won the German cooking competition show Das Perfekte Dinner.

== Filmography ==
| Year | Film | Role |
|---|---|---|
| 2004 | Ephraim | Mark Anderson |
| 2006 | Intelligence | Gelhen |
| 2008 | My Happiness | Baldwin Gregor |
| 2008 | Friends for Life | Pinkus Goldman |
| 2009 | Sink or Swim | Coach Hans Joachim |
| 2010 | 1945A | Nazi Colonel |
| 2011 | Level 26: Dark Revelations | Alain Pantin |
| 2014 | Kidnapping Freddy Heineken | Wig Seller |

== Television ==
| Year | Show | Role | Notes |
|---|---|---|---|
| 2006 | Passions | German Businessman | Episode #1.1811 |
| 2007 | The Unit | Wegner | Episode "Games of Chance" (2.16) |
| 2008 | Days of Our Lives | German Interpreter | Episode #1.10774 |
| 2009 | Star-ving | Hans | Episode "The Scheize Flick" (1.05) |
| 2009 | Extra - Das RTL Magazin | Himself | Episode "Schauspieler in Los Angeles" |
| 2009 | Planet Wissen WDR | Himself | Episode "Hollywood" |
| 2011 | Victorious | Kevin | Episode "The Diddly-Bops" (1.11) |
| 2011 | Das Perfekte Dinner VOX | Himself | Episode Los Angeles |
| 2013 | The Anna Nicole Story Lifetime | Phillip | Made for TV Movie |
| 2013 | General Hospital | Swiss Prison Guard | Episode #1.12910 |
| 2014 | Farmed and Dangerous on Hulu | Dr. Van Riefkind | Series Regular |

== Videogames ==
| Year | Videogame | Role |
|---|---|---|
| 2010 | Red Dead Redemption | Andreas Müller |
| 2014 | Wolfenstein: The New Order | Hans Winkle, Bubi |
