= Dove (Unilever brand) =

Personal care brand owned by the British company Unilever

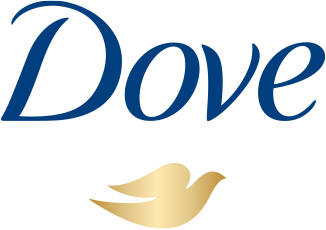
- Product type: Personal care
- Current owner: Unilever
- Introduced: 1956
- Related brands: Dove Men+Care; Baby Dove
- Markets: Worldwide
- Tagline: Let's Change Beauty
- Website: www.dove.com/us/en/home.html

Dove is a personal care brand owned by the British consumer goods company Unilever. Dove products are sold in more than 150 countries and are offered for women, men, babies, adolescents and children. American chemist Vincent Lamberti was granted the original patents related to the manufacturing of Dove in the 1950s, while he worked for Lever Brothers.

== History ==
The brand's original product, the Dove Beauty Bar, was developed by Lever Brothers in the 1950s for the American market. It was launched in the United States in 1957. Not long after, the product was also introduced to Canada. Unilever also briefly test-marketed Dove in Europe in the mid-1960s. However, Unilever did not launch the brand in Europe at that time.

The Dove Beauty Bar was originally developed as a cleansing bar that would not leave behind a bathtub ring (i.e., soap scum). In the 1950s, most American consumers preferred to regularly take baths while seated in bathtubs, rather than standing upright in showers. Thus, the Dove Beauty Bar was intended to save consumers the time and labor needed to constantly scour away bathtub rings. Lever Brothers solved this problem by formulating the Dove Beauty Bar from synthetic detergents, rather than traditional soap.

The Dove Beauty Bar initially reached 3% market share but then remained a niche player in the U.S. bar soap market for more than 25 years. Somehow, the Dove brand ended up attached to both a premium bar soap and a discount dishwashing liquid (i.e., both made from synthetic detergents), and neither were very successful.

In 1979, Unilever relaunched the Dove brand with a medical marketing campaign, claiming that dermatologists had confirmed Dove was less irritating to human skin than other soaps. Today, Dove's mildness—due to its neutral pH—is still its primary selling point. By 1986, Dove had become the best-selling soap brand in the United States. In 1989, Unilever launched the Dove brand in Europe, starting with Italy. In 1991, Dove's rapid growth helped "Unilever overtake Procter & Gamble as America's leading soap maker".

The Dove Beauty Bar is primarily formulated with isethionates. As of 1992, 47–49% of each Dove Beauty Bar in the United States consisted of sodium cocoyl isethionate (SCI), an "expensive ingredient". About 23–25% of each bar consisted of fatty acids, presented as "moisturizing cream". The bar is neutralized to a final pH of 7.2 to 7.5. In the early 21st century, Unilever's success in promoting mildness as a desirable feature caused other cleansing bar manufacturers in Western Europe to reformulate their products away from alkyl sulfate and towards isethionates.

The main "drawback" of sodium cocoyl isethionate bars is their strong coconut odor; as the word "cocoyl" implies, SCI is traditionally derived from coconuts. This is why SCI bars like Dove were traditionally formulated with high fragrance levels, to mask their natural smell. During the 1990s, the odor problem was solved by substituting sodium-distilled, topped cocoyl isethionate (STCI) for SCI, leading to the release of fragrance-free hypoallergenic isethionate bars for sensitive skin. Unilever later transitioned from SCI to sodium lauroyl isethionate as the primary ingredient in the Dove Beauty Bar.

Meanwhile, during the 1990s, Unilever extended the Dove brand to other skin cleansing products and then a broad line of personal care products. By 2001, Dove was the leading brand of bar soap with 24% market share. Within the United States, P&G's flagship personal care brand Olay was bringing in higher sales than the Dove personal care brand (because of Olay's better performance in other categories besides bar soap), but Dove had already surpassed Olay in terms of worldwide sales to become the global leader in personal care products. As of 2001, Dove was bringing in more than a billion dollars per year worldwide, and was Unilever's third-largest brand.

In 2025, $1 million in Dove products was donated to Boys and Girls Clubs of Dane County in Wisconsin, U.S.

== Product lines ==
Products include antiperspirants/deodorants, body washes, beauty bars, lotions/moisturizers, hair care, or facial care products. Dove is primarily made from synthetic surfactants, vegetable oils (such as palm kernel) and salts of animal fats (tallow). In some countries, Dove is derived from tallow, and for this reason it is not considered vegan, unlike vegetable oil based soaps.

In January 2010, Unilever launched a men's toiletries range that was branded as "Dove Men + Care". In November 2013, Steve Bell of Macon, Georgia, won the Dove Men+Care Hair "King of the Castle Home Upgrade" contest, receiving a home upgrade and consultation with Jonathan Scott of Property Brothers.

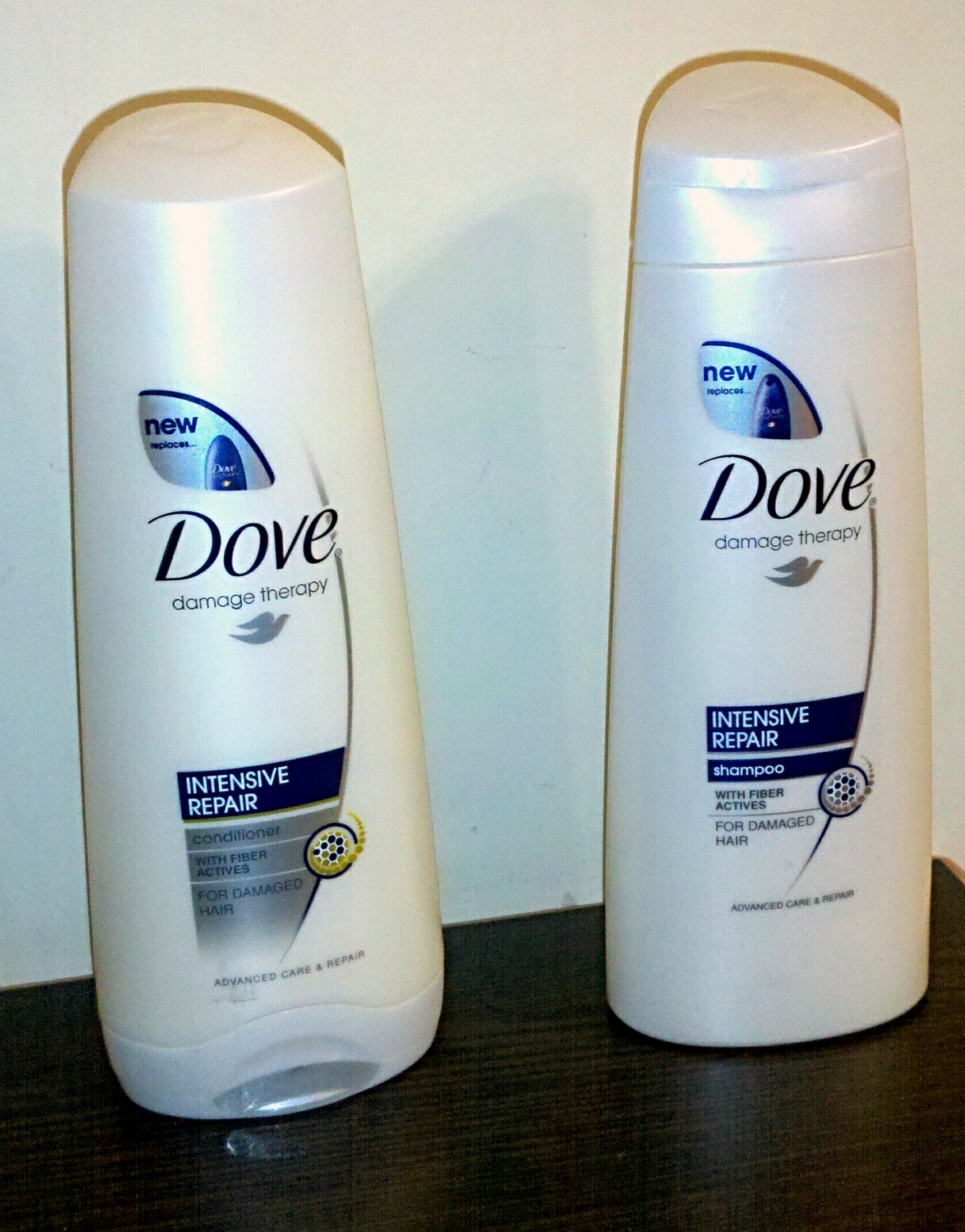
Dove shampoo and conditioner

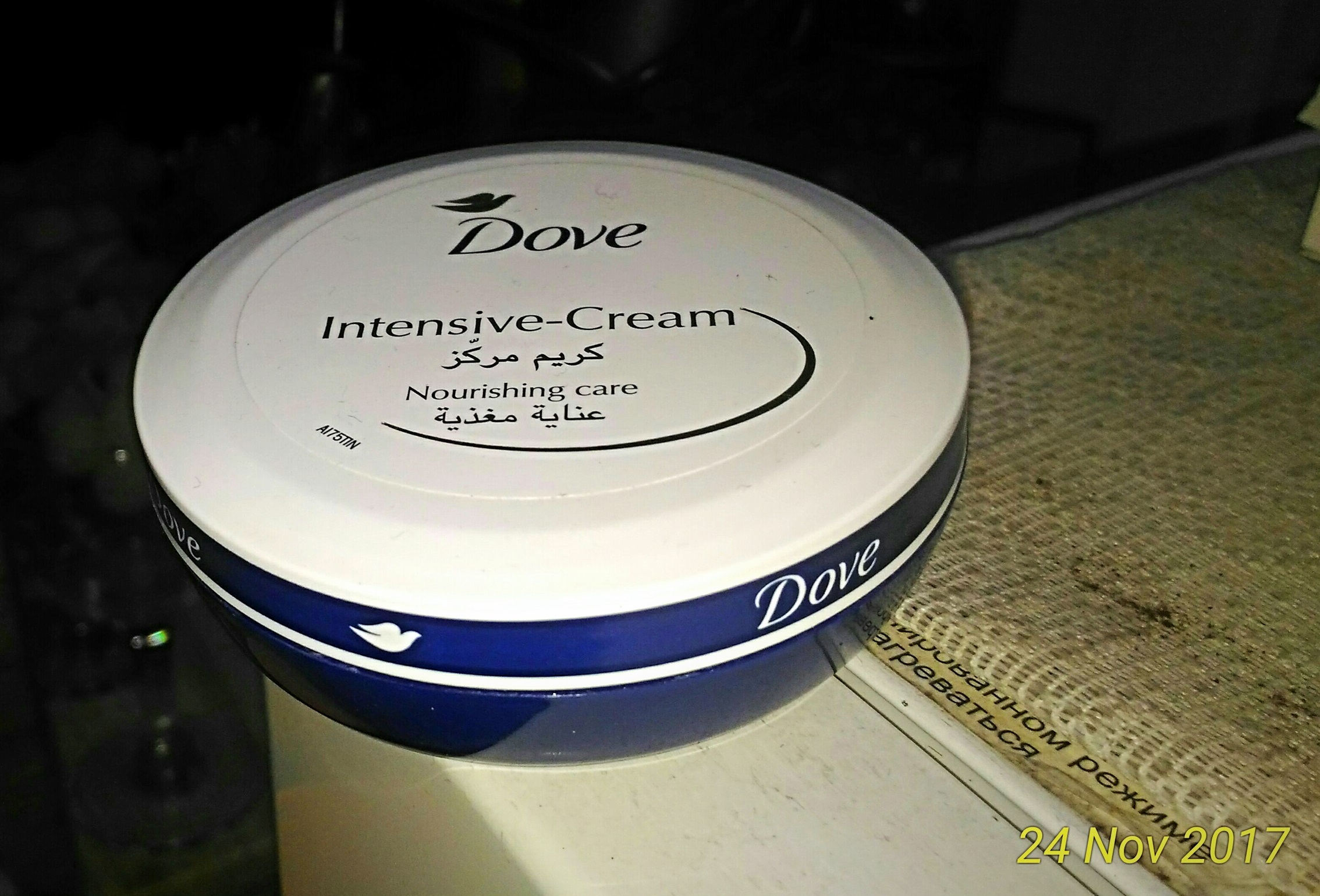
Dove Intensive Cream

== Dove Campaign for Real Beauty ==
In September 2004, Dove began its Campaign for Real Beauty, followed by the creation of the Dove Self-Esteem Project in 2006, by Geyner Andres Gaona and Amy. The campaign has been criticized as hypocritical in light of the highly sexualized images of women presented in the advertising of Axe, which, like Dove, is produced by Unilever.

In 2016, Dove published their largest ever study, in which they interviewed more than 10,000 women from 13 different countries. They found more than half of them felt pressure from the media to fulfil an unrealistic level of beauty, and that women's confidence in relation to body image was on a constant decline.

== Controversies ==
In October 2017, a three-second video for Dove body lotion posted on their Facebook page in the United States prompted criticism and accusations of racism. The video clip showed a black woman removing her T-shirt to reveal a white woman, who then lifts her own T-shirt to reveal an Asian woman. The full thirty-second television advert version included seven women of different races and ages. Unilever withdrew the advertisement and apologized, stating it should "never have happened".

The ad sparked criticism, leading Dove to remove the advert, saying it "deeply regret(ted) the offence it caused." Dove further stated that the "video was intended to convey that Dove body wash is for every woman and be a celebration of diversity". The black woman in the advert, Lola Ogunyemi, said the advert had been misinterpreted and defended Dove.

Starting in 2023, Greenpeace have a campaign "Real beauty, real harm" highlighting the environmental impact of plastic waste from Dove products in countries such as India, Indonesia and the Philippines.

== Research ==
In August 2023, a survey and research conducted in the UK by Kantar's Brand Inclusion Index showed that Dove was considered one of the most inclusive brands for British consumers among other skincare brands.
