= 1975 in music =

This is a list of notable events in music that took place in the year 1975.

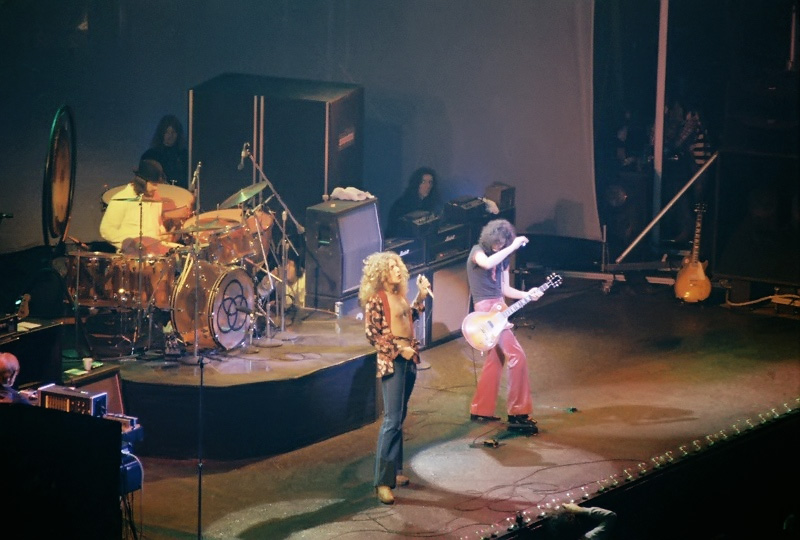
Led Zeppelin in Chicago, 1975

== Specific locations ==
- 1975 in British music
- 1975 in Japanese music
- 1975 in Norwegian music
- 1975 in Scandinavian music

== Specific genres ==
- 1975 in country music
- 1975 in heavy metal music
- 1975 in jazz
- 1975 in progressive rock

== Events ==
=== January–April ===
- January 2 – New York City U.S. District Court Judge Richard Owen rules that former Beatle John Lennon and his lawyers can have access to Department of Immigration files pertaining to his deportation case.
- January 5 – The Wiz, a new musical version of the classic Wizard of Oz story, opens at Broadway's Majestic Theater in New York City.
- January 6 – Approximately 1.000 Led Zeppelin fans, waiting for tickets to go on sale for Led Zeppelin's February 4 concert, cause an estimated $30,000 in damage to the lobby of the Boston Garden. The fans reportedly broke chairs and doors and caused other damage to the building. Boston Mayor Kevin White cancels the upcoming show.
- January 8 – Three Led Zeppelin concerts at Madison Square Garden sell out in a record four hours.
- January 12 – "The Warner Brothers Music Show" begins a nine-city, 18-show tour of Europe. The tour included Warner Brothers acts Little Feat, Tower of Power, the Doobie Brothers, Bonaroo, Montrose, and Graham Central Station.
- January 24 – Jazz pianist Keith Jarrett plays the solo improvisation 'The Köln Concert' at the Cologne Opera, which, recorded live, becomes the best-selling piano recording in history.
- February 13 – The film Slade In Flame, starring the members of Slade, premieres at the Metropole Theatre in London.
- February 21 – John Lennon releases his Rock 'n' Roll LP, featuring his favorite rock songs from the 1950s. To promote the album he conducts a telephone interview with 20 rock radio stations simultaneously.
- March 1 – The 17th Annual Grammy Awards are presented in New York, hosted by Andy Williams. Stevie Wonder's Fulfillingness' First Finale wins Album of the Year, Olivia Newton-John's "I Honestly Love You" wins Record of the Year and Barbra Streisand's "The Way We Were" wins Song of the Year. Marvin Hamlisch wins Best New Artist.
- March 2 – Los Angeles Police make a routine traffic stop that turns out to be Paul McCartney and his wife Linda. Linda is arrested for having 170 to 225 grams (six to eight ounces) of marijuana in her pocketbook.
- March 21 – Alice Cooper, now a solo artist, begins the Welcome to My Nightmare tour in Kalamazoo, Michigan. The elaborate show is among the largest stage spectacles of the decade.
- March 22 – In the Eurovision Song Contest in Stockholm, Sweden, the Dutch group Teach-In wins with the song "Ding-A-Dong".
- March 23 – Promoter Bill Graham stages the S.N.A.C.K. (Students Need Athletics, Culture and Kicks) charity concert at Kezar Stadium in San Francisco, California, to benefit the city's educational system. Almost 60,000 people come to see The Grateful Dead, The Doobie Brothers, Santana, Jefferson Starship, Tower of Power, Eddie Palmieri, Joan Baez, Graham Central Station and Neil Young joined by members of The Band along with a surprise appearance by Bob Dylan. It's the largest benefit concert in history to date.
- March 26 – The film version of The Who's Tommy premieres in London.
- March 29 – Jeff Beck releases the album Blow by Blow. It is the first album to be released using just his name.
- April 3 – Steve Miller is arrested and charged with setting fire to the clothes and personal effects of a friend, Benita DiOrio, and resisting arrest. DiOrio drops the charges the following day.
- April 7 – Ritchie Blackmore plays a final show with Deep Purple in Paris before quitting to form his own group, Rainbow.
- April 17 – Cambodian singer-songwriter Sinn Sisamouth and his pregnant wife are among millions forced out of Phnom Penh by the Khmer Rouge.
- April 24 – Pete Ham, founder of the group Badfinger, is found hanged in his London garage. His death is ruled a suicide.
- April 25 – Alice Cooper's first television special with special guest Vincent Price, Welcome to My Nightmare: The Making of a Record Album airs on ABC's Wide World In Concert, part of a short-lived late night variety series.
- April 28 – Tom Snyder interviews John Lennon on the Tomorrow Show.

=== May–August ===
- May 1 – The Rolling Stones announce their forthcoming North American tour by performing Brown Sugar from a flatbed truck on Fifth Avenue in New York City. The occasion was guitarist Ronnie Wood's debut with the band.
- May 10 – Stevie Wonder performs before 125,000 people at the Washington Monument as part of Human Kindness Day festivities.
- June 1 – The Rolling Stones open their North American Tour in Baton Rouge, Louisiana.
- June 20 – Talking Heads perform their first show at CBGB in New York.
- June 23 – Alice Cooper falls off the stage during a concert in Vancouver, Canada, breaking six ribs.
- June 24 – "Gens du pays", the unofficial national anthem of Quebec, is performed for the first time by Gilles Vigneault in a concert on Montreal's Mount Royal.
- June 30 – Cher and Gregg Allman are married in a Las Vegas hotel suite. That same day, The Jackson 5 leave Motown for CBS Records, but the brothers are forced to change their name to The Jacksons because Motown owns the Jackson 5 name. Jermaine Jackson stays with Motown when his brothers break their contracts and leave for CBS; he is replaced by youngest Jackson brother Randy as a result.
- July 4 – The Texas Senate declares the Fourth of July "Willie Nelson Day", as more than 70,000 fans visit Liberty Hill for the third annual picnic and country rock show headlined by Willie himself.
- August 4 – Robert Plant and his wife Maureen are seriously injured in a car accident while vacationing on the Greek island of Rhodes. The immediate future of Led Zeppelin is cast into doubt, as Plant will not recover for quite some time.
- August 9
  - Dmitri Shostakovich dies in Moscow.
  - The Bee Gees begin their mid-1970s international comeback when "Jive Talkin'" reaches #1 and goes platinum with sales over 1 million.
  - Renato Carosone's comeback concert after a 15-year retirement.
  - The first Rock Music Awards, produced by Don Kirshner, are held in Los Angeles, co-hosted by Elton John and Diana Ross. John wins "Outstanding Rock Personality of the Year". The Who's film Tommy wins "Rock Movie of the Year".
- August 23 – Peter Gabriel leaves British progressive rock group Genesis.

=== September–December ===
- September 12 – Pink Floyd releases their ninth album, Wish You Were Here.
- September 29 – Singer Jackie Wilson suffers a massive heart attack while performing on stage in Cherry Hill, New Jersey. He survives but never physically recovers.
- October 3 – The Who release their seventh studio album, The Who By Numbers.
- October 7 – John Lennon finally wins his battle to stay in the United States after the New York Court of Appeals overturns Lennon's 1972 deportation order.
- October 9
  - John Lennon and Yoko Ono become parents of Sean Ono Lennon at 2:00 AM. The birth heralds the beginning of John's temporary retirement from the music business as he vows to devote himself to family for the next five years.
  - Rock band Kiss earns publicity by playing the homecoming dance of Cadillac High School in Cadillac, Michigan.
- October 11 – Bruce Springsteen appears at the Monmouth Arts Center (Count Basie Theater) for The Homecoming Concert.
- October 18 – Simon & Garfunkel reunite on the second-ever episode of Saturday Night Live on NBC, performing "The Boxer", "Scarborough Fair", and new collaboration "My Little Town".
- October 27 – Bruce Springsteen appears on the covers of both Time and Newsweek magazines on the same week.
- October 30 – Bob Dylan's Rolling Thunder Revue tour begins with a concert at Memorial Hall in Plymouth, Massachusetts.
- November 6 – The Sex Pistols play their first concert at St. Martin's School of Art in London.
- November 10 – Lev Leshchenko revives "Den Pobedy", one of the most popular World War II songs in the Soviet Union.
- November 15 – The 4th OTI Festival, held at the WKAQ-TV studios in San Juan, Puerto Rico, is won by the song "La felicidad", written by Felipe Gil, and performed by Gualberto Castro representing Mexico.
- November 21 – Queen's "Bohemian Rhapsody" goes to number one in the U.K., where it remains for five weeks of 1975 and four weeks of 1976.
- December 6 – The Who set the record for largest indoor concert at the Pontiac Silverdome, attended by 78,000 fans.
- December 10 – The John Denver holiday special Rocky Mountain Christmas airs on ABC.
- December 18 – The official break-up of Faces is announced at a London press conference. Rod Stewart will continue his solo career while Ronnie Wood is widely expected to be announced as an official member of The Rolling Stones in the near future.
- December 23 – Bernard Herrmann completes recording his film soundtrack for Taxi Driver, dying the following day.
- December 24 – The first issue of Punk magazine is released with a January 1976 cover date. A drawing of Lou Reed is on the cover.
- December 25 – Bassist Steve Harris forms Iron Maiden, drawing the name from a torture device mentioned in The Man in the Iron Mask.
- December 31
  - The fourth annual New Year's Rockin' Eve airs on ABC, with performances by Average White Band, Melissa Manchester, Freddy Fender, and Neil Sedaka.
  - Elvis Presley performs before the biggest audience of his career, at Pontiac, Michigan's Silverdome. During the show, Elvis rips his pants onstage and has to leave to change.

== Also in 1975 ==
- John Rutter becomes Director of Music at Clare College, Cambridge.
- Billy Davis Jr. and Marilyn McCoo leave the 5th Dimension and start solo careers.
- The Goodies have five top twenty singles (in the UK) becoming, according to Bill Oddie, "the first, the only and the most successful comedy rockers".
- Ramones sign to Sire Records.
- First release of "And the Band Played Waltzing Matilda", by John Currie, on Australian label M7.

== Bands formed ==
- See Musical groups established in 1975

== Bands disbanded ==
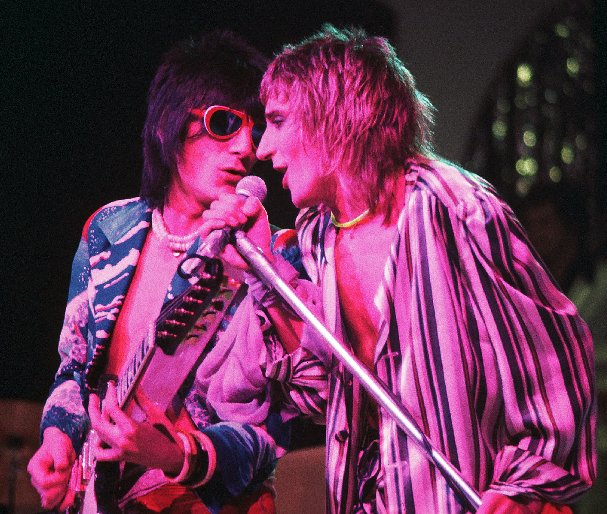
Ronnie Wood and Rod Stewart with "Faces" in 1975, the year the band disbanded.

- See Musical groups disestablished in 1975

== Albums released ==
=== January ===
Day	Album	Artist	Notes
8	Promised Land	Elvis Presley	-
16	Forever, Michael	Michael Jackson	-
20	Blood on the Tracks	Bob Dylan	-
23	Never Can Say Goodbye	Gloria Gaynor	-
29	An Evening with John Denver	John Denver	Live
-	Commoners Crown	Steeleye Span	-
-	Don't Cha Love It	The Miracles	-
-	Down by the Jetty	Dr. Feelgood	-
-	The First Minute of a New Day	Gil Scott-Heron and Brian Jackson	-
-	Flavours	The Guess Who	-
-	It's Time	Bonnie Bramlett	-
-	Melissa	Melissa Manchester	-
-	Modern Times	Al Stewart	-
-	New Year, New Band, New Company	John Mayall	-
-	Picture Music	Klaus Schulze	-
-	Play Don't Worry	Mick Ronson	-
-	Plug Me Into Something	Henry Gross	-
-	Scorching Beauty	Iron Butterfly	-
-	Sunday's Child	John Martyn	-
-	Urban Renewal	Tower of Power	-

=== February ===
Day	Album	Artist	Notes
7	Mister Magic	Grover Washington, Jr.	-
7	Pieces of the Sky	Emmylou Harris	-
12	Have You Never Been Mellow	Olivia Newton-John	-
14	Fly by Night	Rush	-
14	On the Level	Status Quo	-
16	Bolan's Zip Gun	T.Rex	-
17	The Bargain Store	Dolly Parton	-
17	High Voltage	AC/DC	Australia-only; Debut
17	Rock 'n' Roll	John Lennon	Covers album
21	Desperate Straights	Slapp Happy and Henry Cow	-
24	Physical Graffiti	Led Zeppelin	-
27	On Your Feet or on Your Knees	Blue Öyster Cult	Live
28	Welcome to My Nightmare	Alice Cooper	
28	Yesterdays	Yes	Compilation
-	Ambrosia	Ambrosia	Debut Album
-	Changing Woman	Buffy Sainte-Marie	-
-	Cold on the Shoulder	Gordon Lightfoot	-
-	Dixie Rock	Wet Willie	-
-	For Earth Below	Robin Trower	-
-	Mad Dog	John Entwistle	-
-	Neu! '75	Neu!	-
-	No Mystery	Return to Forever	-
-	Pampered Menial	Pavlov's Dog	Debut
-	Really Rosie	Carole King	Soundtrack
-	Song for America	Kansas	-
-	Street Rats	Humble Pie	-
-	Then Came You	Dionne Warwick	-
-	To Be True	Harold Melvin & the Blue Notes	-
-	Unrequited	Loudon Wainwright III	Studio and live
-	Visions of the Emerald Beyond	Mahavishnu Orchestra	-

=== March ===
Day	Album	Artist	Notes
3	That's the Way of the World	Earth, Wind & Fire	Soundtrack
7	The Best Years of Our Lives	Steve Harley & Cockney Rebel	-
7	The Rotters' Club	Hatfield and the North	-
7	Tea Break Over–Back on Your 'Eads!	IF	-
7	Young Americans	David Bowie	-
14	Blue Jays	Justin Hayward and John Lodge	-
15	Funny Lady	Barbra Streisand	Soundtrack
17	Judith	Judy Collins	-
19	Dressed to Kill	Kiss	-
19	Hearts	America	-
19	Tommy	Various Artists	Soundtrack
21	Rubycon	Tangerine Dream	-
24	Chicago VIII	Chicago	-
24	Nuthin' Fancy	Lynyrd Skynyrd	-
24	Specs Appeal	The Shadows	-
25	Just Another Way to Say I Love You	Barry White	-
25	Slow Dazzle	John Cale	-
26	A Quiet Storm	Smokey Robinson	-
27	The Myths and Legends of King Arthur and the Knights of the Round Table	Rick Wakeman	-
28	Blow by Blow	Jeff Beck	-
28	Ian Hunter	Ian Hunter	-
28	Straight Shooter	Bad Company	-
-	Between the Lines	Janis Ian	-
-	Bundles	Soft Machine	-
-	Duit on Mon Dei	Harry Nilsson	-
-	Feel Like Makin' Love	Roberta Flack	-
-	Feelings	Paul Anka	-
-	Frampton	Peter Frampton	-
-	Go Girl Crazy!	The Dictators	-
-	The Great Fatsby	Leslie West	-
-	I'll Play for You	Seals & Crofts	-
-	Katy Lied	Steely Dan	-
-	Let There Be Music	Orleans	-
-	Lou Reed Live	Lou Reed	Live
-	Nils Lofgren	Nils Lofgren	Debut
-	The Original Soundtrack	10cc	–
-	Songbird	Jesse Colin Young	-
-	Spring Fever	Rick Derringer	-
-	Sweet Deceiver	Kevin Ayers	-
-	Switch	Golden Earring	-
-	There's One in Every Crowd	Eric Clapton	-
-	Two Sides of the Moon	Keith Moon	-

=== April ===
Day	Album	Artist	Notes
1	Journey	Journey	Debut
2	The Manhattan Transfer	The Manhattan Transfer	-
7	Will O' The Wisp	Leon Russell	-
8	Chocolate City	Parliament	-
8	Toys in the Attic	Aerosmith	-
11	Fish Rising	Steve Hillage	-
14	Spirit of America	The Beach Boys	Compilation
16	Playing Possum	Carly Simon	-
18	Fandango!	ZZ Top	Half live/half studio
21	ABBA	ABBA	
21	Let's Take It to the Stage	Funkadelic	-
22	Jamaica Say You Will	Joe Cocker	-
25	The Snow Goose	Camel	-
25	Stampede	The Doobie Brothers	-
-	Ain't Life Grand	Black Oak Arkansas	-
-	Al Green's Greatest Hits	Al Green	Compilation
-	The Beau Brummels	The Beau Brummels	-
-	Beautiful Loser	Bob Seger	-
-	Diamonds & Rust	Joan Baez	-
-	Discothèque	Herbie Mann	-
-	Hair of the Dog	Nazareth	-
-	Hokey Pokey	Richard and Linda Thompson	-
-	New City	Blood, Sweat & Tears	-
-	Stars	Cher	-
-	Subtle as a Flying Mallet	Dave Edmunds	-
-	Survival	The O'Jays	-
-	Tomorrow Belongs to Me	Sensational Alex Harvey Band	-
-	USA	King Crimson	Live

=== May ===
Day	Album	Artist	Notes
1	Coming Down Your Way	Three Dog Night	-
1	Your Mamma Won't Like Me	Suzi Quatro	-
5	Newborn	James Gang	-
7	Today	Elvis Presley	-
9	In Praise of Learning	Henry Cow	-
9	Warrior on the Edge of Time	Hawkwind	-
15	Moving Violation	Jackson 5	-
16	Soap Opera	The Kinks	UK
17	Fox	Fox	Debut
19	Steppin'	Pointer Sisters	-
22	Adventures in Paradise	Minnie Riperton	-
23	Captain Fantastic and the Brown Dirt Cowboy	Elton John	-
23	Initiation	Todd Rundgren	-
23	Love Will Keep Us Together	Captain & Tennille	-
27	Venus and Mars	Wings	-
-	America's Choice	Hot Tuna	-
-	Ernie Sings & Glen Picks	Tennessee Ernie Ford and Glen Campbell	-
-	Four Wheel Drive	Bachman–Turner Overdrive	-
-	Gorilla	James Taylor	-
-	Once Upon a Star	Bay City Rollers	-
-	Red Headed Stranger	Willie Nelson	-
-	Ruth Is Stranger Than Richard	Robert Wyatt	-
-	Spirit of '76	Spirit	-
-	Tale Spinnin'	Weather Report	-
-	There's No Place Like America Today	Curtis Mayfield	-

=== June ===
Day	Album	Artist	Notes
6	Horizon	Carpenters	-
6	Made in the Shade	The Rolling Stones	Compilation
6	Metamorphosis	The Rolling Stones	Outtakes recorded 1964–70
7	The Heat Is On	The Isley Brothers	-
10	Cut the Cake	Average White Band	-
10	One of These Nights	Eagles	-
13	Red Octopus	Jefferson Starship	-
13	Return to Fantasy	Uriah Heep	-
16	Why Can't We Be Friends?	War	-
20	Greatest Hits	Cat Stevens	Compilation
20	It's My Pleasure	Billy Preston	-
20	Tonight's the Night	Neil Young	-
23	Stills	Stephen Stills	-
25	One Size Fits All	Frank Zappa and The Mothers of Invention	-
26	The Basement Tapes	Bob Dylan & The Band	Recorded 1967–75
-	Dreaming My Dreams	Waylon Jennings	-
-	Nuclear Nightclub	Wigwam	
-	The Hit Man	Eddie Kendricks	-
-	HQ	Roy Harper	-
-	Jasmine Nightdreams	Edgar Winter	-
-	Main Course	Bee Gees	-
-	Rising for the Moon	Fairport Convention	-
-	Stand Back	April Wine	-
-	Trying to Burn the Sun	Elf	-
-	The Tubes	The Tubes	-

=== July ===
Day	Album	Artist	Notes
1	Trooper	Trooper	-
4	Ride a Rock Horse	Roger Daltrey	-
6	KC and the Sunshine Band	KC and the Sunshine Band	-
11	Fleetwood Mac	Fleetwood Mac	US
11	From Mighty Oaks	Ray Thomas	-
28	Sabotage	Black Sabbath	US
-	Armageddon	Armageddon	-
-	The Dream Weaver	Gary Wright	-
-	Ego Is Not a Dirty Word	Skyhooks	-
-	Fire on the Bayou	The Meters	-
-	Force It	UFO	-
-	Futurama	Be-Bop Deluxe	-
-	Half a Love	The Chi-Lites	-
-	Head over Heels	Poco	-
-	The Higher They Climb	David Cassidy	-
-	In the City	Tavares	-
-	Metal Machine Music	Lou Reed	-
-	Now Look	Ronnie Wood	-
-	Outlaws	Outlaws	-
-	Power in the Music	The Guess Who	-
-	Rhinestone Cowboy	Glen Campbell	-
-	Scheherazade and Other Stories	Renaissance	-
-	Sha Na Now	Sha Na Na	-
-	Stop	Eric Burdon Band	-
-	This Time We Mean It	REO Speedwagon	-

=== August ===
Day	Album	Artist	Notes
1	Procol's Ninth	Procol Harum	-
4	Ritchie Blackmore's Rainbow	Rainbow	Debut/US
15	Atlantic Crossing	Rod Stewart	-
16	Honey	Ohio Players	-
18	Daryl Hall & John Oates	Hall & Oates	-
18	Say Forever You'll Be Mine	Porter Wagoner and Dolly Parton	-
19	Phoenix	Labelle	-
20	Deluxe	Harmonia	-
22	Man-Child	Herbie Hancock	-
22	Nightingales & Bombers	Manfred Mann's Earth Band	-
22	Win, Lose or Draw	The Allman Brothers Band	-
25	Born to Run	Bruce Springsteen	-
27	Love to Love You Baby	Donna Summer	-
27	Searchin' for a Rainbow	The Marshall Tucker Band	-
28	The Best of Michael Jackson	Michael Jackson	Compilation
-	Free Hand	Gentle Giant	-
-	Acid Queen	Tina Turner	-
-	Al Green Is Love	Al Green	-
-	Caught in the Act	Grand Funk Railroad	Live
-	E. C. Was Here	Eric Clapton	Live
-	Mellow Madness	Quincy Jones	-
-	Pick of the Litter	The Spinners	-
-	So Fine	Loggins & Messina	-
-	Spirit of the Boogie	Kool & The Gang	-
-	Stamp Album	Climax Blues Band	-
-	Timewind	Klaus Schulze	-

=== September ===
Day	Album	Artist	Notes
1	Blues for Allah	Grateful Dead	-
5	Another Year	Leo Sayer	-
5	Bandolier	Budgie	-
5	Minstrel in the Gallery	Jethro Tull	-
6	Face the Music	Electric Light Orchestra	-
9	Hotline	The J. Geils Band	-
10	Alive!	Kiss	Live
12	Fighting	Thin Lizzy	-
12	Landed	Can	-
12	Second Chapter	Danny Kirwan	-
12	Wish You Were Here	Pink Floyd	-
15	Dolly: The Seeker/We Used To	Dolly Parton	-
15	Fool for the City	Foghat	-
15	Prisoner in Disguise	Linda Ronstadt	-
15	Wind on the Water	Crosby & Nash	-
17	In Trance	Scorpions	-
19	Windsong	John Denver	-
22	Changing All the Time	Smokie	-
22	Extra Texture (Read All About It)	George Harrison	U.S. release. 3 October in U.K.
24	Caress of Steel	Rush	-
26	Warner Bros. Presents	Montrose	-
27	Portrait Gallery	Harry Chapin	-
30	Clearly Love	Olivia Newton-John	-
-	Artful Dodger	Artful Dodger	-
-	Bay City Rollers	Bay City Rollers	Compilation; North America debut
-	Captured Angel	Dan Fogelberg	-
-	Dreamboat Annie	Heart	Debut/Canada; released in US Feb. '76
-	In the Slot	Tower of Power	-
-	John Fogerty	John Fogerty	-
-	Masque	Kansas	-
-	Maximum Darkness	Man	-
-	No Reservations	Blackfoot	Debut
-	The Sound of Sunshine	The Sunshine Band	Instrumental
-	Symphonion Dream	Nitty Gritty Dirt Band	-
-	Ted Nugent	Ted Nugent	Debut
-	Thirteen Blue Magic Lane	Blue Magic	-
-	Waterbed	Herbie Mann	-
-	X-Rated	Black Oak Arkansas	-

=== October ===
Day	Album	Artist	Notes
1	Tryin' to Get the Feeling	Barry Manilow	-
2	Bongo Fury	Frank Zappa & The Mothers of Invention with Captain Beefheart	Live + some studio tracks
3	The Who by Numbers	The Who	-
14	Breakaway	Art Garfunkel	-
14	Lazy Afternoon	Barbra Streisand	-
16	You	Aretha Franklin	-
17	The Last Record Album	Little Feat	-
17	Still Crazy After All These Years	Paul Simon	
20	Lisztomania	Rick Wakeman	Soundtrack
20	Shaved Fish	John Lennon	Compilation
21	Nighthawks at the Diner	Tom Waits	Live
24	Rock of the Westies	Elton John	
24	Siren	Roxy Music	-
27	Angel	Angel	-
31	Against the Grain	Rory Gallagher	-
-	Godbluff	Van der Graaf Generator	-
-	All Around My Hat	Steeleye Span	-
-	Born to Be with You	Dion DiMucci	-
-	The Car Over the Lake Album	The Ozark Mountain Daredevils	-
-	Downtown Flyers	Streetwalkers	-
-	Flying Again	The Flying Burrito Brothers	-
-	Indiscreet	Sparks	-
-	Malpractice	Dr. Feelgood	-
-	Mother Focus	Focus	-
-	Movin' On	Commodores	-
-	Power and the Passion	Eloy	-
-	Sun and Steel	Iron Butterfly	-
-	Voyage of the Acolyte	Steve Hackett	-

=== November ===
Day	Album	Artist	Notes
1	Northern Lights – Southern Cross	The Band	-
1	Spanish Train and Other Stories	Chris de Burgh	-
3	History: America's Greatest Hits	America	Compilation
7	Come Taste the Band	Deep Purple	
7	Old No. 1	Guy Clark	Debut
7	Ommadawn	Mike Oldfield	
8	Making Music	Bill Withers	-
10	Chicago IX: Chicago's Greatest Hits	Chicago	Compilation
10	Horses	Patti Smith	
10	Zuma	Neil Young & Crazy Horse	-
11	Gratitude	Earth, Wind & Fire	-
14	Another Green World	Brian Eno	-
14	Helen of Troy	John Cale	-
17	Greatest Hits	ABBA	Compilation
17	The Hissing of Summer Lawns	Joni Mitchell	-
17	Schoolboys in Disgrace	The Kinks	-
17	Teaser	Tommy Bolin	-
18	Rufus featuring Chaka Khan	Rufus	-
21	Fish Out of Water	Chris Squire	
21	Greatest Hits	Nazareth	
24	The Best of Carly Simon	Carly Simon	Compilation
25	Family Reunion	The O'Jays	-
25	Nightrider	Charlie Daniels	-
28	Crisis? What Crisis?	Supertramp	-
28	A Night at the Opera	Queen	-
30	The Köln Concert	Keith Jarrett	-
30	Numbers	Cat Stevens	-
-	Crack the Sky	Crack The Sky	Debut
-	Heaven and Hell	Vangelis	
-	Hot Chocolate	Hot Chocolate	-
-	It's Only Love	Rita Coolidge	-
-	Nomadness	Strawbs	-
-	Pour Down Like Silver	Richard and Linda Thompson	-
-	Pressure Drop	Robert Palmer	-
-	Radio-Activity	Kraftwerk	-
-	Strung Up	Sweet	-
-	Together	Anne Murray	-
-	Track of the Cat	Dionne Warwick	-
-	Who's to Bless and Who's to Blame	Kris Kristofferson	-

=== December ===
Day	Album	Artist	Notes
1	Elva kvinnor i ett hus	Agnetha Fältskog	-
1	Equinox	Styx	-
1	T.N.T.	AC/DC	Australia
4	Stephen Stills Live	Stephen Stills	-
5	Live!	Bob Marley & The Wailers	Live
12	Blast from Your Past	Ringo Starr	Compilation
12	Live/Hhaï	Magma	Live
12	Marcus Garvey	Burning Spear	-
15	Mothership Connection	Parliament	-
29	Elite Hotel	Emmylou Harris	-
-	Discreet Music	Brian Eno	-
-	Evening Star	Fripp & Eno	-
-	Head On	Bachman–Turner Overdrive	-
-	Mustard	Roy Wood	-
-	Ricochet	Tangerine Dream	Live
-	Wouldn't You Like It?	Bay City Rollers	-

=== Release date unknown ===
- The Art of Tea – Michael Franks
- Brass Construction – Brass Construction
- Celebration – Andrew Cyrille
- Chuck Berry – Chuck Berry
- Come Again – the Jaggerz
- Confusion – Fela Kuti
- Das schönste im Leben – Die Flippers
- Dreadlocks Dread – Big Youth
- Ego Ti Eho Ke Ti Tha 'Ho – Tolis Voskopoulos
- El amor – Julio Iglesias
- Ella and Oscar – Ella Fitzgerald, Oscar Peterson
- Expensive Shit – Fela Kuti
- A Funky Thide of Sings – Billy Cobham
- Gil e Jorge – Jorge Ben
- Profondo Rosso (soundtrack) – Goblin (band)
- Goodbye – Gene Ammons
- High Step – Paul Chambers and John Coltrane
- Home Plate – Bonnie Raitt
- Journey to Love – Stanley Clarke
- Juice Newton & Silver Spur – Juice Newton and Silver Spur
- The Bitch Is Black - Yvonne Fair
- Mel Tormé live at the Maisonette – Mel Tormé
- Montreux '75 – Ella Fitzgerald
- Moxy – Moxy
- Music Keeps Me Together – Taj Mahal
- Nasty Gal – Betty Davis
- Not a Little Girl Anymore – Linda Lewis
- Now – The Dubliners
- Old Fashioned Love – John Fahey
- Oscar Peterson and Dizzy Gillespie – Oscar Peterson and Dizzy Gillespie
- Oscar Peterson and Harry Edison – Oscar Peterson, Harry "Sweets" Edison
- Oscar Peterson and Roy Eldridge – Oscar Peterson and Roy Eldridge
- Oscar Peterson in Russia – Oscar Peterson
- The Other Side of Me – Andy Williams
- Pre-Creedence – The Golliwogs – compilation
- Rimmel – Francesco de Gregori
- The Rocky Horror Picture Show – various artists – soundtrack
- Ronnie Drew – Ronnie Drew (solo debut)
- Say It Ain't So – Murray Head
- Solstice – Ralph Towner
- The Sweet Singles Album – Sweet
- Taking Off – David Sanborn
- Tails of Illusion – Fox
- Tales Of Mozambique – Count Ossie
- Train Ride to Hollywood – Bloodstone – soundtrack to their feature movie
- Trapeze – Trapeze
- Trouble – Sailor
- Two Steps Forward, One Step Back – Patrick Sky
- Velvet Donkey – Ivor Cutler

== Billboard Top popular records of 1975 ==
"TOP RECORDS OF 1975 (from Billboard December 27, 1975)

The information compiled for the top records survey is based on the weekly chart positioning and length of time records were on the respective charts from the issue dates of November 2, 1974 through November 1, 1975. These recaps, as well as the weekly charts, do not reflect actual sales figures. The ratings take into account the number of weeks the disk was on the chart, plus the weekly positions it held during its chart life. Each disk was given points accordingly for its respective chart, and in addition, the number one disk each week was assigned bonus points equal to the total number of positions on its respective charts."

Unfortunately, Billboard's late December print deadline prevented approximately 60 records from completing their full chart runs, and includes data of approximately 50 records from 1976, some of which have enough points to rank in the current years chart. In contrast with the Billboard Year-End Hot 100 singles of 1975, the chart below does not truncate or split chart runs between years. It does not add two months from 1974, delete two months from 1975 and then call itself the "Year-End Hot 100 singles of 1975", which it is obviously not. Joel Whitburn's Records Research books, archived issues of Billboard for November–December 1974 and December 1975 – March 1976, and Hot 100 Year-End formulas were used to complete the year-end chart reprinted here.

The completed Billboard year-end list for 1975 is composed of records that entered the Billboard Hot 100 between November 1974 and December 1975. Records with chart runs that started in 1974 and ended in 1975, or started in 1975 and ended in 1976, made this chart if the majority of their chart weeks were in 1975. If not, they were ranked in the year-end charts for 1974 or 1976. If their weeks were equal, they were listed in the year they first entered. Appearing in multiple years is not permitted. Each week thirty points were awarded to the number one record, then nineteen points for number two, eighteen points for number three, and so on. The total points a record earned determined its year-end rank. The complete chart life of each record is represented, with number of points accrued. There are no ties, even when multiple records have the same number of points. The next ranking category is peak chart position, then weeks at peak chart position, weeks on Hot 100 chart, weeks in top forty, and finally weeks in top ten. All chart rankings represented below for the Top Soul Singles, Top Country Singles, Top Easy Listening Singles, and Top CashBox pop singles were all calculated in the same manner.

The chart can be sorted by Artist, Song title, Recording and Release dates, Cashbox year-end ranking (CB) or units sold (sales) by clicking on the column header. Additional details for each record can be accessed by clicking on the song title, and referring to the Infobox in the right column of the song page. Billboard also has chart summaries on its website. Sales information was derived from the RIAA's Gold and Platinum database, the BRIT Certified database and The Book of Golden Discs, but numbers listed should be regarded as estimates. Grammy Hall of Fame and National Recording Registry information with sources can be found on Wikipedia.

Rank	Artist	Title	Label	Recorded	Release date	CB	Sales	Charts, Awards
1	Glen Campbell	"Rhinestone Cowboy"	Capitol 4095	March 19, 1975	May 26, 1975	3	3.25	US Billboard 1975 #1, US Hot100 #1 for 2 weeks, 22 total weeks, 212 points, Top Country Singles 1975 #1, Country Singles #1 for 3 weeks, 21 total weeks, 196 points, Top Easy Listening Singles 1975 #5, Easy Listening Singles #1 for 1 week, 15 total weeks, 168 points
2	The Elton John Band	"Philadelphia Freedom"	MCA 40364	August 1974	February 24, 1975	4	3.00	US Billboard 1975 #2, US Hot100 #1 for 2 weeks, 21 total weeks, 207 points
3	The Captain and Tennille	"Love Will Keep Us Together"	A&M 1672	1975	April 1975	7	3.00	US Billboard 1975 #3, US Hot100 #1 for 4 weeks, 23 total weeks, 204 points, Grammy Hall of Fame 2022
4	John Denver	"I'm Sorry/Calypso"	RCA 10353	May 1975	July 1975	36	5.00	US Billboard 1975 #4, US Hot100 #1 for 1 weeks, 18 total weeks, 188 points, Top Country Singles 1975 #5, Country Singles #1 for 1 weeks, 18 total weeks, 142 points, Top Easy Listening Singles 1975 #4, Easy Listening Singles #1 for 2 weeks, 13 total weeks, 172 points
5	Ohio Players	"Love Rollercoaster"	Mercury 73734	1975	November 9, 1975	16	1.50	US Billboard 1975 #5, US Hot100 #1 for 1 weeks, 16 total weeks, 188 points
6	Eagles	"One of These Nights"	Asylum 45257	1975	May 19, 1975	15	1.50	US Billboard 1975 #6, US Hot100 #1 for 1 weeks, 17 total weeks, 179 points, Top Mainstream Rock 1975 #9
7	K.C. and the Sunshine Band	"That's The Way (I Like It)"	T.K. 1015	1975	June 10, 1975	1	3.00	US Billboard 1975 #7, US Hot100 #1 for 2 weeks, 14 total weeks, 176 points
8	David Bowie	"Fame"	RCA Victor 10320	January 1975	June 1975	17	1.50	US Billboard 1975 #8, US Hot100 #1 for 1 weeks, 17 total weeks, 166 points
9	Elton John	"Island Girl"	MCA 40461	July 1975	September 29, 1975	9	3.00	US Billboard 1975 #9, US Hot100 #1 for 3 weeks, 15 total weeks, 163 points
10	The Bee Gees	"Jive Talkin'"	RSO 510	February 19, 1975	May 1975	2	2.00	US Billboard 1975 #10, US Hot100 #1 for 2 weeks, 17 total weeks, 162 points
11	Earth, Wind & Fire	"Shining Star"	Columbia 10090	October 1974	January 21, 1975	11	1.25	US Billboard 1975 #11, US Hot100 #1 for 1 weeks, 20 total weeks, 160 points, Top Soul Singles 1975 #8, Hot Soul Singles #1 for 2 weeks, 16 total weeks, 144 points, Grammy Hall of Fame 2008, from album "That's the Way of the World"-Columbia 33280, Grammy Hall of Fame 2004
12	Minnie Riperton	"Lovin' You"	Epic 50057	October 1974	January 1975	5	3.25	US Billboard 1975 #12, US Hot100 #1 for 1 weeks, 18 total weeks, 159 points
13	Silver Convention	"Fly, Robin, Fly"	Midland Int'l. 10339	March 1975	September 1975	14	2.25	US Billboard 1975 #13, US Hot100 #1 for 3 weeks, 17 total weeks, 155 points
14	Tony Orlando and Dawn	"He Don't Love You (Like I Love You)"	Elektra 45240	December 1974	March 1975	34	3.00	US Billboard 1975 #14, US Hot100 #1 for 3 weeks, 14 total weeks, 152 points
15	Van McCoy & the Soul City Symphony	"The Hustle"	Avco 4653	1975}	April 18, 1975	18	6.00	US Billboard 1975 #15, US Hot100 #1 for 1 weeks, 19 total weeks, 151 points, Top Soul Singles 1975 #6, Hot Soul Singles #1 for 1 weeks, 19 total weeks, 155 points
16	LaBelle	"Lady Marmalade (Voulez-Vous Coucher Avec Moi)"	Epic 50048	May 1975	June 10, 1975	6	3.00	US Billboard 1975 #16, US Hot100 #1 for 1 weeks, 18 total weeks, 151 points, Grammy Hall of Fame 2003, National Recording Registry 2020
17	Neil Sedaka	"Bad Blood"	Rocket 40460	March 1975	September 2, 1975	13	1.25	US Billboard 1975 #17, US Hot100 #1 for 2 weeks, 14 total weeks, 149 points
18	Diana Ross	"Theme from Mahogany (Do You Know Where You're Going To)"	Motown 1377	March 1975	September 1975	41	1.50	US Billboard 1975 #18, US Hot100 #1 for 1 weeks, 17 total weeks, 148 points
19	The Doobie Brothers	"Black Water"	Warner Bros. 8062	March 18, 1975	July 16, 1975	27	2.25	US Billboard 1975 #19, US Hot100 #1 for 1 weeks, 17 total weeks, 148 points
20	Linda Ronstadt	"You're No Good"	Capitol 3990	July 5, 1974	November 19, 1974	24	1.50	US Billboard 1975 #20, US Hot100 #1 for 1 weeks, 16 total weeks, 135 points
21	Olivia Newton-John	"Have You Never Been Mellow"	MCA 40349	October 1974	January 21, 1975	10	1.50	US Billboard 1975 #21, US Hot100 #1 for 1 weeks, 16 total weeks, 134
22	Freddy Fender	"Before the Next Teardrop Falls"	Dot 17540	October 1974	January 1975	29	1.50	US Billboard 1975 #22, US Hot100 #1 for 1 week, 21 total weeks, 134 points, Top Country Singles 1975 #6, Country Singles #1 for 2 weeks, 17 total weeks, 124 points
23	Eagles	"Best Of My Love"	Asylum 45218	1974	November 5, 1974	47	1.50	US Billboard 1975 #23, US Hot100 #1 for 1 weeks, 19 total weeks, 134 points, Top Easy Listening Singles 1975 #10, Easy Listening Singles #1 for 1 weeks, 17 total weeks, 146 points
24	Olivia Newton-John	"Please Mr. Please"	MCA 40418	October 1974	May 11, 1975	21	1.50	US Billboard 1975 #24, US Hot100 #3 for 2 weeks, 15 total weeks, 134 points, Top Easy Listening Singles 1975 #8, Easy Listening Singles #1 for 3 weeks, 13 total weeks, 161 points
25	Elton John	"Lucy In The Sky With Diamonds"	MCA 40344	June 1974	November 18, 1974	35	3.00	US Billboard 1975 #25, US Hot100 #1 for 2 weeks, 14 total weeks, 133 points
26	The Miracles	"Love Machine (Part 1)"	United Artists 940	June 13, 1975	August 21, 1975	8	2.00	US Billboard 1975 #25, US Hot100 #1 for 1 weeks, 28 total weeks, 133 points
27	Paul McCartney and Wings	"Listen to What the Man Said"	Capitol 4091	February 20, 1975	March 16, 1975	25	3.00	US Billboard 1975 #26, US #1 for 1 weeks, 14 total weeks, 133 points
28	John Denver	"Thank God I'm A Country Boy"	RCA 10353	August 26, 1974	March 1975	22	5.00	US Billboard 1975 #27, US Hot100 #1 for 1 weeks, 19 total weeks, 132 points
29	Morris Albert	"Feelings"	Arista 0244	1975	May 1975	57	2.00	US Billboard 1975 #28, US Hot100 #6 for 1 weeks, 32 total weeks, 132 points
30	Ohio Players	"Fire"	Mercury 73643	Feb–Aug 1974	November 1974	39	6.5	US Billboard 1975 #30, US Hot100 #1 for 1 weeks, 17 total weeks, 130 points, Top Soul Singles 1975 #1, Hot Soul Singles #1 for 2 weeks, 18 total weeks, 192 points
31	Eagles	"Lyin' Eyes"	Asylum 45279	January 1975	September 8, 1975	28	1.50	US Billboard 1975 #29, US Hot100 #2 for 2 weeks, 14 total weeks, 130 points, Top Mainstream Rock 1975 #5
32	AWB	"Pick Up The Pieces"	Atlantic 3229	May 1974	October 21, 1974	11	1.25	US Billboard 1975 #30, US Hot100 #1 for 1 weeks, 17 total weeks, 129 points
33	The Staple Singers	"Let's Do It Again"	Curtom 0109	1975	October 1975	30	1.25	US Billboard 1975 #31, US Hot100 #1 for 1 weeks, 15 total weeks, 129 points, Top Soul Singles 1975 #4, Hot Soul Singles #1 for 2 weeks, 18 total weeks, 174 points
178	Bruce Springsteen	"Born to Run"	Columbia 10209	Feb–Aug 1974	August 25, 1975	94	6.5	US Billboard 1975 #178, US Hot100 #23 for 2 weeks, 11 total weeks, Top Rock 1975 #1, Grammy Hall of Fame 2003, National Recording Registry 2003, from album Born to Run-Columbia 33795, Grammy Hall of Fame 2003.

== Chronological table of U.S. and UK and Japan number one hit singles ==
U.S. number one singles and artist (weeks at number one)	UK number one singles and artist (weeks at number one)
"Lucy in the Sky with Diamonds" – Elton John (2) "Mandy" – Barry Manilow (1) "Please Mr. Postman" – The Carpenters (1) "Laughter in the Rain" – Neil Sedaka (1) "Fire" – Ohio Players (1) "You're No Good" – Linda Ronstadt (1) "Pick Up the Pieces" – Average White Band (1) "Best of My Love" – Eagles (1) "Have You Never Been Mellow" – Olivia Newton-John (1) "Black Water" – The Doobie Brothers (1) "My Eyes Adored You" – Frankie Valli (1) "Lady Marmalade" – Labelle (1) "Lovin' You" – Minnie Riperton (1) "Philadelphia Freedom" – Elton John (2) "(Hey Won't You Play) Another Somebody Done Somebody Wrong Song" – B. J. Thomas (1) "He Don't Love You (Like I Love You)" – Tony Orlando and Dawn (3) "Shining Star" – Earth, Wind & Fire (1) "Before the Next Teardrop Falls" – Freddy Fender (1) "Thank God I'm a Country Boy" – John Denver (1) "Sister Golden Hair" – America (1) "Love Will Keep Us Together" – Captain & Tennille (4) "Listen to What the Man Said" – Paul McCartney & Wings (1) "The Hustle" – Van McCoy (1) "One of These Nights" – Eagles (1) "Jive Talkin'" – Bee Gees (2) "Fallin' in Love" – Hamilton, Joe Frank & Reynolds (1) "Get Down Tonight" – KC and the Sunshine Band (1) "Rhinestone Cowboy" – Glen Campbell (2) "Fame" – David Bowie (2) "I'm Sorry" – John Denver (1) "Bad Blood" – Neil Sedaka (3) "Island Girl" – Elton John (3) "That's the Way (I Like It)" – KC and the Sunshine Band (2) "Fly, Robin, Fly" – Silver Convention (3) "Let's Do It Again" – The Staple Singers (1)	"Lonely This Christmas" – Mud (2 weeks 1974 + 2 weeks 1975) "Down Down" – Status Quo (1) "Ms Grace" – The Tymes (1) "January" – Pilot (3) "Make Me Smile (Come Up and See Me)" – Steve Harley & Cockney Rebel (2) "If" – Telly Savalas (2) "Bye, Bye, Baby (Baby Goodbye)" – Bay City Rollers (6) "Oh Boy" – Mud (2) "Stand by Your Man" – Tammy Wynette (3) "Whispering Grass" – Windsor Davies & Don Estelle (3) "I'm Not in Love" – 10cc (2) "Tears on My Pillow (I Can't Take It)" – Johnny Nash (1) "Give a Little Love" – Bay City Rollers (3) "Barbados" – Typically Tropical (1) "Can't Give You Anything (But My Love)" – The Stylistics (3) "Sailing" – Rod Stewart (4) "Hold Me Close" – David Essex (3) "I Only Have Eyes for You" – Art Garfunkel (2) "Space Oddity" – David Bowie (2) "D.I.V.O.R.C.E." – Billy Connolly (1) "Bohemian Rhapsody" – Queen" (5 weeks 1975 + 4 weeks 1976)

Note: best sellers of the year are bold.

Japanese Oricon number one singles and artist
(weeks at number one)

- "Fuyu no Iro" – Momoe Yamaguchi (2 weeks 1974 + 4 weeks 1975)
- "Hajimete no Dekigoto" – Junko Sakurada (1)
- "Shitetsu Ensen" – Goro Noguchi (3)
- "22-sai no Wakare" – Kaze (4)
- "Waga Yoki Tomoyo" – Hiroshi Kamayatsu (4)
- "Showa Kare Susuki" – Sakura & Ichiro (3)
- "Cyclamen no Kaori" – Akira Fuse (5)
- "Kakkoman Boogie / Minato no Yoko Yokohama Yokosuka" – Down Town Boogie Woogie Band (5)
- "Kokoro Nokori" – Takashi Hosokawa (4)
- "Omoide Makura" – Kyoko Kosaka (1)
- "Romance" – Hiromi Iwasaki (3)
- "Toki no Sugiyuku Mama ni" – Kenji Sawada (5)
- "Ichigo Hakusho wo Mou Ichido" – Bang Bang (6)
- "Sentimental" – Hiromi Iwasaki (2)
- "Ano Hi ni Kaeritai" – Yumi Arai (2)

== Top 40 Chart hit singles ==
Song title	Artist(s)	Release date(s)	US	UK	Highest chart position	Other Chart Performance(s)
"Bad Time"	Grand Funk	March 1975	4	n/a	4 (United States)	See chart performance entry
"Ballroom Blitz"	The Sweet	June 1975	5	2	1 (Canada, Australia)	See chart performance entry
"Breaking Up Is Hard to Do"	Neil Sedaka	December 1975	8	n/a	8 (United States)	See chart performance entry
"Chevy Van"	Sammy Johns	February 1975	5	n/a	5 (United States)	See chart performance entry
"Could It Be Magic"	Barry Manilow	June 1975	6	n/a	6 (United States)	See chart performance entry
"Cut the Cake"	Average White Band	June 1975	10	31	10 (United States)	See chart performance entry
"Do It in the Name of Love"	Ben E. King	March 1975	n/a	n/a	4 (US R&B)	See chart performance entry
"Don't Call Us, We'll Call You"	Sugarloaf	November 1974	9	n/a	9 (United States)	See chart performance entry
"Games People Play"	Spinners	August 1975	5	n/a	5 (United States)	See chart performance entry
"Happy Days"	Pratt & McClain	March 1976	5	31	3 (Canada)	See chart performance entry
"Heat Wave"	Linda Ronstadt	September 1975	5	n/a	5 (United States)	See chart performance entry
"Holdin' on to Yesterday"	Ambrosia	May 1975	17	n/a	17 (United States)	See chart performance entry
"How Sweet It Is (To Be Loved by You)"	James Taylor	June 1975	5	n/a	1 (US AC, Canada AC)	See chart performance entry
"I Don't Like to Sleep Alone"	Paul Anka	March 1975	8	n/a	8 (United States)	See chart performance entry
"I Write the Songs"	Barry Manilow	November 1975	1	n/a	1 (United States)	See chart performance entry
"It Only Takes a Minute"	Tavares	July 1975	10	n/a	1 (US R&B)	See chart performance entry
"It's a Miracle"	Barry Manilow	February 1975	12	n/a	1 (US AC)	See chart performance entry
"I'm Not in Love"	10cc	May 1975	2	1	1 (United Kingdom, Ireland, Canada)	See chart performance entry
"Killer Queen"	Queen	October 1974	12	2	2 (United Kingdom, Ireland)	See chart performance entry
"Long Tall Glasses (I Can Dance)"	Leo Sayer	September 1974	9	4	4 (United Kingdom)	See chart performance entry
"Lover Please"	Kris Kristofferson and Rita Coolidge	November 1974	n/a	n/a	42 (US AC)	See chart performance entry
"Magic"	Pilot	September 1974	5	11	5 (United States)	See chart performance entry
"Mamma Mia"	ABBA	September 1975	32	1	1 (United Kingdom, Australia, Germany)	See chart performance entry
"Miracles"	Jefferson Starship	August 1975	3	n/a	3 (United States)	See chart performance entry
"Moviestar"	Harpo	July 1975	n/a	24	1 (Sweden, Norway, Germany, Austria)	See chart performance entry
"Mr. Jaws"	Dickie Goodman	August 1975	4	n/a	4 (United States)	See chart performance entry
"My Little Town"	Simon & Garfunkel	October 1975	9	n/a	1 (US AC)	See chart performance entry
"My Man and Me"	Lynsey de Paul	February 1975	n/a	40	40 (United Kingdom)	See chart performance entry
"Never Can Say Goodbye"	Gloria Gaynor	October 1974	9	2	2 (United Kingdom)	See chart performance entry
"The Proud One"	Osmond Brothers	July 1975	22	5	1 (US AC)	See chart performance entry
"Roll On Down the Highway"	Bachman-Turner Overdrive	January 1975	14	22	4 (Canada)	See chart performance entry
"Sad Sweet Dreamer"	Sweet Sensation	September 1974	14	1	1 (United Kingdom)	See chart performance entry
"Sky High"	Jigsaw	August 1975	3	9	1 (Japan)	See chart performance entry
"S.O.S."	ABBA	June 1975	15	6	1 (Australia, Germany, New Zealand)	See chart performance entry
"Take Me in Your Arms"	The Doobie Brothers	April 1975	11	29	11 (United States)	See chart performance entry
"To the Door of the Sun (Alle Porte del Sole)"	Al Martino	November 1974	17	n/a	7 (US AC)	See chart performance entry
"Who Loves You"	Four Seasons	August 1975	3	6	3 (United States)	See chart performance entry
"Why Can't We Be Friends"	War	April 1975	6	n/a	6 (United States)	See chart performance entry
"Wonderful Baby"	Don McLean	October 1974	93	60	1 (US AC)	See chart performance entry

== Number One hit singles ==
Song title	Artist(s)	Release date(s)	Date reached number one	Weeks at number one	Country(s)
"As Soon as I Hang Up the Phone"	Conway Twitty & Loretta Lynn	July 1974	May 1975	1 week	South Africa
"Barbados"	Typically Tropical	May 1975	August 1975	1 week	Ireland, South Africa, United Kingdom
"Before the Next Teardrop Falls"	Freddy Fender	January 1975	May 1975	1 week	United States
"D.I.V.O.R.C.E."	Billy Connolly	October 1975	November 1975	1 week	United Kingdom
"Fox on the Run"	Sweet	March 1975	April 1975	1 week	Australia, Denmark, South Africa, West Germany
"Give a Little Love"	Bay City Rollers	July 1975	July 1975	3 weeks	Ireland, United Kingdom
"Hey You"	Bachman–Turner Overdrive	May 1975	July 1975	1 week	South Africa
"Horror Movie"	Skyhooks	December 1974	March 1975	2 weeks	Australia
"Island Girl"	Elton John	September 1975	November 1975	3 weeks	United States
" (I Believe) There's Nothing Stronger Than Our Love"	Paul Anka & Odia Coates	July 1975	October 1975	1 week	Canada
"Jump in My Car"	Ted Mulry Gang	September 1975	November 1975	6 weeks	Australia
"Love Is All"	Red Hurley	April 1975	April 1975	1 week	Ireland
"Love Will Keep Us Together"	Captain & Tennille	April 1975	June 1975	4 weeks	Australia, Canada, United States
"Milky Ways"	Colombus	October 1975	November 1975	5 weeks	South Africa
"Ms Grace"	The Tymes	December 1974	January 1975	1 week	Ireland, United Kingdom
"My Little Angel"	William Shakespeare	November 1974	February 1975	3 weeks	Australia
"Paloma Blanca"	George Baker Selection	March 1975	June 1975	1 week	5 countries
"Rhinestone Cowboy"	Glen Campbell	May 1975	September 1975	3 weeks	Canada, Ireland, United States, Yugoslavia
"Sailing"	Rod Stewart	August 1975	September 1975	4 weeks	5 countries
"Shame, Shame, Shame"	Shirley & Company	December 1974	February 1975	5 weeks	5 countries
"She's A Woman"	Neil Herbert	December 1974	January 1975	1 week	South Africa
"Shining Star"	Earth, Wind & Fire	January 1975	May 1975	1 week	United States
"Summer Love"	Sherbet	March 1975	May 1975	2 weeks	Australia
"Thank God I'm a Country Boy"	John Denver	March 1975	June 1975	1 week	United States
"The Ballroom Blitz"	The Sweet	September 1973	October 1975	1 week	Canada
"The Newcastle Song"	Bob Hudson	January 1975	March 1975	4 weeks	Australia, New Zealand
"Whispering Grass"	Windsor Davies & Don Estelle	April 1975	June 1975	3 weeks	United Kingdom
Yesterday's Hero"	John Paul Young	February 1975	May 1977	2 weeks (May 1977)	South Africa
"Yesterday Was Just the Beginning of My Life"	Mark Williams	May 1975	June 1975	3 weeks	New Zealand
"You Ask Me To"	Bobby Angel	January 1975	March 1975	2 weeks	South Africa

== Other selected singles ==
- "All My Friends Are Getting Married" – Skyhooks (# 2 Australia)
- "At Va'Ani" – Shlomo Artzi (# 2 Israel) (Israel's 1975 Eurovision entry)
- "Bony Moronie" – Hush (# 4 Australia)
- "Ego Is Not a Dirty Word" – Skyhooks (# 2 Australia)
- "Ein Lied kann eine Brücke sein" – Joy Fleming (# 32 Germany) (Germany's 1975 Eurovision entry)
- "Era" – Wess and Dori Ghezzi (# 6 Switzerland) (Italy's 1975 Eurovision entry)
- "Girls On the Avenue" – Richard Clapton (# 4 Australia)
- "My Little Angel" – William Shakespeare (# 2 Australia)
- "Rak Off Normie!" – Maureen Elkner (# 6 Australia)
- "So Far Away from L.A." – Nicolas Peyrac (# 4 France)
- "That's What Friends Are For" – The Swarbriggs (# 2 Ireland) (Ireland's 1975 Eurovision entry)
- "Tonite Is a Wonderful Time to Fall in Love" – April Wine (# 5 Canada)
- "Wart auf mich" – Michael Holm (# 4 Germany)
- "Yesterday's Hero" – John Paul Young (# 8 Australia)

== Notable singles ==
Song title	Artist(s)	Release date(s)	Other Chart Performance(s)
"30 Seconds Over Tokyo" b/w "Heart of Darkness"	Pere Ubu	December 1975	n/a
"Autobahn" (Single Version) b/w "Morgenspaziergang"	Kraftwerk	January 1975	#25 (United States), #11 (United Kingdom)
"Baby, Please Don't Go" b/w "Love Song"	AC/DC	February 1975	#20 (Australia)
"Chocolate City" b/w "I Misjudged You"	Parliament	March 1975	#24 (US R&B)
"Ego Is Not a Dirty Word" b/w "Every Chase a Wild Goose"	Skyhooks	April 1975	#2 (Australia)
"High Voltage" b/w "Soul Stripper"	AC/DC	July 1975	#10 (Australia)
"Hunters and Collectors" b/w "Vernal Equinox"	Can	May 1975	n/a
"I Keep a Close Watch" b/w "Engine"	John Cale	September 1975	n/a
"Isi" b/w "After Eight"	Neu!	March 1975	n/a
"It's a Long Way to the Top (If You Wanna Rock 'n' Roll)" b/w "Can I Sit Next to You Girl"	AC/DC	December 1975	#9 (Australia)
"Little Johnny Jewel, Part One" b/w "Little Johnny Jewel, Part Two"	Television	October 1975	n/a
"Master Race Rock" b/w "I Got You Babe"	The Dictators	March 1975	n/a
"Million Dollar Riff" b/w "Forging Ahead"	Skyhooks	October 1975	#6 (Australia)
"No Bother to Me" b/w "Home Sweet Home"	Split Enz	May 1975	n/a
"Ovelha negra"	Rita Lee & Tutti Frutti	June 1975	n/a
"P-Funk (Wants to Get Funked Up)" b/w "Night of the Thumpasorus Peoples"	Parliament	November 1975	#9 (US R&B)
"Radioactivity" b/w "Antenna"	Kraftwerk	November 1975	#4 (France)
"Roxette" b/w "Route 66" (Live)	Dr. Feelgood	November 1975	n/a
"Rockaway Beach" (Demo) b/w "53rd & 3rd"	Ramones	November 1975	n/a
"The Redondo Beach Demo" b/w "Distance Fingers"	Patti Smith	June 1975	n/a
"The Third Reich 'n' Roll (Hitler Was a Vegetarian)" (Promo Edit)	The Residents	October 1975	n/a
"Too Much Junkie Business" b/w "You Can't Put Your Arms Around a Memory" (Demo)	Johnny Thunders & The Heartbreakers	July 1975	n/a
"White Punks on Dope" b/s "White Punks on Dope Part II"	The Tubes	1975	n/a
"Willie the Pimp" (Part One) b/w "Willie the Pimp" (Part Two)	Captain Beefheart / Frank Zappa	May 1975	n/a

=== Other Notable singles ===
- "Gamblin' Bar Room Blues" b/w "Shake That Thing" – The Sensational Alex Harvey Band

== Published popular music ==
- "And All That Jazz" w. Fred Ebb m. John Kander. Introduced by Chita Rivera in the musical Chicago
- "Anytime (I'll Be There)" w.m. Paul Anka
- "At Seventeen" w.m. Janis Ian
- "Calypso" w.m. John Denver
- "I'm Not in Love" w.m. Graham Gouldman & Eric Stewart
- "I'm Sorry" w.m. John Denver
- "Love Will Keep Us Together" w.m. Neil Sedaka & Howard Greenfield
- "Mamma Mia" w.m. Benny Andersson, Stig Anderson & Björn Ulvaeus
- "Movin' On Up" w.m. Jeff Barry and Ja'net Dubois, theme from the TV series The Jeffersons
- "New York State of Mind" w.m. Billy Joel
- "One" w. Edward Kleban m. Marvin Hamlisch
- "Rockin' All Over the World" w.m. John C. Fogerty
- "Wasted Days and Wasted Nights" w.m. Freddy Fender & Wayne Duncan
- "The Way I Want To Touch You" w.m. Toni Tennille
- "What I Did For Love" w. Edward Kleban m. Marvin Hamlisch
- "You" w.m. Tom Snow

== Classical music ==
- Samuel Adler – Symphony No. 5, We are the Echoes
- Osvaldas Balakauskas – Sonata of the Mountains
- Claude Bolling and Jean-Pierre Rampal – Suite for Flute and Jazz Piano
- Mario Davidovsky – Scenes from Shir ha-Shirim for soprano, two tenors, bass soli and chamber ensemble
- Klaus Huber – Blätterlos for piano
- Wojciech Kilar – Bogurodzica for mixed choir and orchestra
- Theo Loevendie – Concerto for Bass Clarinet and Orchestra, Incantations
- Witold Lutosławski – Les Espaces du sommeil
- Krzysztof Meyer
  - Sonata for piano, No. 5
  - Sonata for solo violin
- Frederic Rzewski – The People United Will Never Be Defeated!
- Karlheinz Stockhausen
  - Harlekin, for clarinet, Nr. 42
  - Der kleine Harlekin, for clarinet, Nr. 42½
  - Musik im Bauch, for six percussionists and music boxes, Nr. 41
  - Tierkreis, for a melody and/or chording instrument, Nr. 41½
- Alexander Vustin – The Word
- Dmitri Shostakovich – Sonata for Viola and Piano, Op. 147 (his final work)

== Opera ==
- Viktor Ullmann – Der Kaiser von Atlantis (16 December, Bellevue Centre, Amsterdam)
- John Rutter – Bang! (14 March, Fairfield Halls, Croydon)
- Aulis Sallinen – The Horseman (17 June, Savonlinna Opera Festival)

== Musical theatre ==
- Chicago – Broadway production opened at the 46th Street Theatre and ran for 936 performances
- A Chorus Line (Marvin Hamlisch and Edward Kleban) – Broadway production opened at the Shubert Theatre and ran for 6137 performances, the longest run of any Broadway musical at the time
- A Little Night Music (Stephen Sondheim) – London production
- Dance With Me – Broadway production opened at the Mayfair Theatre and ran for 396 performances
- The Wiz – Broadway production opened at the Majestic Theatre and ran for 1672 performances

== Musical films ==
- At Long Last Love
- Funny Lady
- Lisztomania
- The Magic Flute
- The Rocky Horror Picture Show
- Tommy
- Train Ride to Hollywood

== Births ==
=== January ===
- January 2
  - Doug Robb (Hoobastank)
  - Chris Cheney, Australian rock musician (The Living End)
  - Jung Sung-hwa, South Korean actor
- January 3
  - Thomas Bangalter, French record producer, singer-songwriter, DJ and composer (Daft Punk)
  - Christian Argenti, Australian singer and radio presenter (Invertigo)
- January 5 – Bradley Cooper, American singer, actor, film maker, voice actor and producer (A Star Is Born, 2018, starring Lady Gaga)
- January 8
  - Harris Jayaraj, Indian film composer and producer
  - DJ Clue, American DJ, record producer, radio personality and record executive
- January 11
  - Venetian Snares, electronic dance music composer, influential in breakcore
  - Timbuktu, Swedish rapper and singer
- January 13 – Jason King, radio DJ
- January 15
  - Edith Bowman, British radio DJ
  - Belinda Chapple, Australian singer, actress and creative director
- January 17
  - Rami Yacoub, Swedish-born Palestinian music producer and songwriter (Cheiron Studios and Maratone)
  - Coco Lee, Hong Kong–born American singer, songwriter, record producer, dancer, and actress (d. 2023)
- January 22 – Balthazar Getty, American actor, musician and member of Getty family.
- January 24 – Paul Marazzi, English singer (A1)
- January 28
  - Tanya Chua, Singaporean singer-songwriter
  - Lee Latchford-Evans, British singer (Steps)
- January 29 – Kelly Packard, American singer-actress-hostess
- January 30 – Yumi Yoshimura, Japanese singer (Puffy Amiyumi)

=== February ===
- February 1 – Big Boi (OutKast)
- February 3 – Markus Schulz, German DJ and record producer
- February 4 – Natalie Imbruglia, Australian singer-songwriter, model and actress
- February 5 – Adam Carson, drummer (AFI)
- February 6
  - Tomoko Kawase, Japanese singer
  - Matt Alber, American singer-songwriter
- February 7 – Wes Borland (Limp Bizkit)
- February 14 – Scott Owen, Australian rock musician (The Living End)
- February 17 – Harisu, South Korean singer, model and actress
- February 18 – Simon Kvamm, Danish singer, keyboard player, and actor (Nephew)
- February 19 – Daniel Adair, Canadian rock drummer (Nickelback)
- February 20 – Brian Littrell, American singer (Backstreet Boys)
- February 21 – Heri Joensen, Faroese rock musician (Týr)
- February 22 – Sébastien Tellier, an independent French singer, songwriter and multi-instrumentalist (Worked with Dita Von Teese)
- February 23 – Robert Lopez, American composer and lyricist of musicals

=== March ===
- March 1 – Valentina Monetta, Sanmarinese singer
- March 2 – Lee Sun-kyun, South Korean actor (d. 2023)
- March 4 – Hawksley Workman, Canadian rock singer-songwriter
- March 6
  - Misha, Slovak singer
  - Yannick Nézet-Séguin, Canadian conductor
- March 8 – Peggy Zina, Greek singer
- March 10
  - DJ Aligator, Danish producer and DJ
  - Jerry Horton, American alternative rock lead guitarist (Papa Roach)
- March 11 – Big Boy, Puerto Rican reggaeton and hip hop rapper
- March 12 – Kelle Bryan, British singer (Eternal)
- March 15
  - will.i.am, American musician, rapper, singer-songwriter, DJ, record producer and entrepreneur (The Black Eyed Peas)
  - Eva Longoria, American actress and producer
- March 17
  - Justin Hawkins, English singer-songwriter and guitarist (The Darkness)
  - Jairzinho Oliveira, Brazilian singer-songwriter-composer
- March 18 – Sutton Foster, American actress, singer and dancer
- March 19 – Brann Dailor, American drummer and singer (Mastodon)
- March 24 – Krisdayanti, Indonesian singer
- March 25 – Melanie Blatt, English singer-songwriter and actress (All Saints)
- March 27 – Fergie (Stacy Ferguson), American singer-songwriter and dancer (The Black Eyed Peas)

=== April ===
- April 5 – Juicy J, American rapper and record producer
- April 7 – Karin Dreijer, Swedish singer-songwriter and record producer
- April 8 – Anouk, Dutch singer-songwriter and musician
- April 10 – Chris Carrabba, American rock musician (Dashboard Confessional)
- April 13 – Lou Bega, German singer
- April 14 – Stefano Miceli, Italian conductor and pianist
- 22 April – Anders Nyström, Swedish guitarist (Katatonia & Bloodbath)
- 23 April
  - Jonsi, Icelandic musician and member of Sigur Ros
  - Olga Kern, Russian pianist
- April 26
  - Joey Jordison, American musician and songwriter (Slipknot) (d. 2021)
  - José Pasillas (Incubus)
- April 30 – Tomi Joutsen, Finnish metal musician

=== May ===
- May 2 – David Beckham, English footballer (Married to Victoria Beckham, Worked with Geri Halliwell)
- May 3 – Maksim Mrvica, Croatian crossover pianist
- May 8 – Enrique Iglesias, Spanish singer-songwriter, actor and record producer
- May 9 – Tamia, Canadian singer and songwriter
- May 13 – Evelin Samuel, Estonia singer and songwriter
- May 15
  - Frode Haltli, Norwegian accordionist
  - Peter Iwers, Swedish rock bassist (In Flames)
- May 16
  - Tony Kakko, Finnish singer
  - B.Slade, American singer
- May 17 – Laura Voutilainen, Finnish pop singer
- May 18
  - Jack Johnson, American singer-songwriter, musician and documentary film-maker
  - Jem, Welsh singer-songwriter
- May 19 – Jonas Renkse, Swedish vocalist (Katatonia) and bassist (Bloodbath)
- May 20 – Andrew Sega, American electronic musician
- May 24 – Alex Lacamoire, American musical arranger (Hamilton)
- May 25
  - Lauryn Hill, American singer-songwriter, rapper, record producer and actress (The Fugees)
  - Alex Orbison, American musician
- May 27
  - André 3000, American rapper, singer-songwriter, record producer, dancer and actor (OutKast)
  - Chrigel Glanzmann, Swiss metal singer
  - ZP Theart, South African singer and songwriter
  - Jadakiss, American rapper
- May 29 – Melanie Brown, English singer-songwriter, presenter, television personality, dancer, actress, author and model (Spice Girls)

=== June ===
- June 2
  - Gisle Torvik, Norwegian jazz guitarist
  - Zia McCabe, American keyboardist (The Dandy Warhols)
- June 4
  - Russell Brand, English actor, comedian and DJ
  - Julian Marley, British-Jamaican musician, songwriter, producer and humanitarian
- June 5 – Scott Holroyd, American actor
- June 8 – Emm Gryner, Canadian singer-songwriter
- June 11 – Choi Ji-woo, South Korean actress and model
- June 13 – Kim Jo-sun, South Korean archer
- June 16 – Anabel Conde, Spanish singer
- June 18 – Silkk the Shocker, American rapper
- June 20 – Loon, American rapper
- June 23
  - KT Tunstall, Scottish singer-songwriter and musician
  - DJ Antoine, Swiss DJ and record producer
- June 26
  - KJ-52, American rapper (Peace of Mind)
  - Marie-Nicole Lemieux, Canadian operatic contralto
- June 28
  - Jon Nödtveidt, Swedish singer (d. 2006)
  - Ning Baizura, Malaysian singer

=== July ===
- July 1 – Sufjan Stevens, American folk musician
- July 2 – Erik Ohlsson, Swedish guitarist (Millencolin)
- July 3 – Javier Weyler (Stereophonics)
- July 5 – Gunnar H. Thomsen, Faroese rock bassist (Týr)
- July 6 – 50 Cent, American rapper, actor, businessman, and investor
- July 7 – DJ Green Lantern, American disc jockey and record producer
- July 8 - I-20, American rapper
- July 9
  - Isaac Brock, American musician
  - Shona Fraser, British-born music journalist and judge
  - Jessica Folcker, Swedish singer
  - Jack White, American musician, singer, songwriter, record producer and actor (The White Stripes)
- July 11 – Rubén Baraja, Spanish footballer
- July 12 – Cheyenne Jackson, American actor and singer
- July 14
  - Jaime Luis Gomez, known as "Taboo", rapper/singer of the Black Eyed Peas
  - Tameka Cottle known as "Tiny", American singer/songwriter member of the group Xscape
  - Jamey Johnson, American country singer and songwriter
- July 17 – Darude, Finnish DJ and record producer
- July 18
  - Daron Malakian (System of a Down)
  - M.I.A., British rapper, singer-songwriter, record producer, and activist
- July 21 – Fredrik Johansson, Swedish rock guitarist
- July 22 – Aile Asszonyi, operatic soprano
- July 25 – Håvard Ellefsen (Mortiis)

=== August ===
- August 5 – Eicca Toppinen, Finnish cellist (Apocalyptica)
- August 7 – Gaahl, black metal vocalist
- August 15 – Big Noyd, American rapper
- August 19 – Mỹ Linh, Vietnamese singer
- August 21 – Sharissa, American singer
- August 27
  - Björn Gelotte Swedish guitarist (In Flames)
  - Mase, rapper
- August 28 – Marek Szulen, electronic music composer
- August 31
  - Daniel Harding, English orchestral conductor and airline pilot
  - Sara Ramirez, Mexican American actress, singer-songwriter and activist

=== September ===
- September 1
  - Natalie Bassingthwaighte, Australian actress and singer
  - Omar Rodríguez-López (At the drive-in, The Mars Volta)
- September 2 – MC Chris, American rapper, comedian, voice actor and writer
- September 3
  - Redfoo, American rapper, singer, songwriter, actor, dancer, record producer and DJ
  - Gala, Italian pop singer and songwriter
- September 4 – Mark Ronson, British DJ and music producer
- September 8 – Richard Hughes, British drummer (Keane)
- September 9 – Michael Bublé, Canadian-Italian big band, swing, vocal jazz singer, songwriter, actor and record producer.
- September 11
  - Brad Fischetti, LFO
  - Elephant Man, Jamaican singer
- September 16 – Shannon Noll, Australian singer
- September 17 – Constantine Maroulis, American singer (Pray for the Soul of Betty)
- September 20 – Asia Argento, Italian actress, singer, model, activist and director.
- September 21
  - Lil Rob, Chicano rapper
  - U-Jean, American pop, R&B and hip-hop artist
- September 22 – Mystikal, rapper
- September 23 – Chris Hawkins, British radio personality
- September 25 – Declan Donnelly, English television and singer (Ant & Dec)
- September 26 – Pete Gofton, English musician and record producer (Kenickie)
- September 27
  - Tim Campbell (actor), Australian stage actor, actor, singer and musician (Anthony Callea)
  - Thanos Petrelis, Greek singer
- September 30
  - Georges-Alain Jones, French singer
  - Glenn Fredly, Indonesian R&B singer and songwriter (d. 2020)
  - Marion Cotillard, French actress

=== October ===
- October 3 – India Arie, American singer-songwriter, actress, musician and record producer
- October 7
  - Damian Kulash, American singer-songwriter and guitarist (OK Go and 8in8)
  - Tim Minchin, British-Australian singer-songwriter, comic performer and director
- October 9
  - Alain Altinoglu, French conductor
  - Brandy Clark, American country music singer-songwriter
  - Sean Ono Lennon, American singer-songwriter and actor, son of John Lennon and Yoko Ono
- October 12 – Jorane, French-Canadian singer and cellist
- October 13 – Freekey Zekey, American rapper (The Diplomats)
- October 14 – Shaznay Lewis, English singer (All Saints)
- October 23 - Jessicka, American singer/songwriter (Jack Off Jill)
- October 25 – Melissa Graham, English singer
- October 27
  - Kate Havnevik, Norwegian film composer and singer-songwriter
  - Max Lilja, Finnish cellist (Apocalyptica)
- October 30
  - Ian D'Sa, Canadian rock guitarist (Billy Talent)
  - Steve Kazee, American singer and actor (Jenna Dewan)

=== November ===
- November 1 – Bo Bice, American singer
- November 2 – Chris Walla, American guitarist (Death Cab for Cutie)
- November 5
  - Lisa Scott-Lee, Welsh singer-songwriter and dancer (Steps)
  - Jamie Spaniolo (Jamie Madrox), American rapper
  - Keala Settle, American actress and singer.
- November 8 – Ángel Corella, Spanish dancer
- November 10 – Jim Adkins, American singer-songwriter and guitarist (Jimmy Eat World)
- November 12 – Aaron Solowoniuk, Canadian rock drummer (Billy Talent)
- November 14
  - Travis Barker, American musician, drummer and producer (blink-182)
  - Faye Tozer, English singer-songwriter, dancer and stage actress (Steps)
- November 17 – Yoon Son-ha, South Korean actress and singer
- November 18 – Ant McPartlin, English television presenter and singer (Ant & Dec)
- November 19 – Tamika Scott, American singer/songwriter and producer
- November 20
  - Dierks Bentley, American singer-songwriter
  - Davey Havok, AFI
  - Jeffrey Lewis, American anti-folk singer
- November 25 – Paul Mealor, composer
- November 26 – DJ Khaled, American DJ and record producer
- November 30 - Mindy McCready, American country singer-songwriter (d. 2010)

=== December ===
- December 5 – Paula Patton, American songwriter under the pseudonym "Max"
- December 10 - Kristel Verbeke, Flemish singer (K3)
- December 13 – Tom Delonge, American musician (blink-182)
- December 14 – Justin Furstenfeld (Blue October)
- December 16 – Benjamin Kowalewicz, Canadian rock lead singer (Billy Talent)
- December 18
  - Sia, Australian singer-songwriter, record producer and music video director (Britney Spears, Kylie Minogue, Kate Pierson)
  - Shay Haley, American musician (N.E.R.D.)
- December 21 – Paloma Herrera, Argentine ballet dancer
- December 22 – Amy Wadge, British singer-songwriter
- December 23
  - Katie Underwood, Australian singer-songwriter (Bardot)
  - Lady Starlight, American DJ and Producer, frequently worked with Lady Gaga
- December 27
  - Nike Ardilla, Indonesian singer (d. 1995)
  - Solomun (musician), Bosnian DJ and music producer
- December 30 – Yoma Komatsu, former member of the female J-Pop group BeForU

=== Unknown month ===
  - Jonas Jeberg, Danish producer, singer songwriter, and musician
  - Slow (DJ), Finnish DJ and music producer

== Deaths ==
- January 8 – Richard Tucker, operatic tenor, 61 (heart attack)
- January 11 – Max Lorenz, Wagnerian tenor, 73
- January 16 – Paul Beaver, electronic jazz keyboardist, 49
- January 26 – Toti Dal Monte, operatic soprano, 81
- January 30 – Boris Blacher, composer, 72
- February 2 – Eleanor French, singer, 59
- February 3 – Umm Kulthum, singer, songwriter and actress
- February 4 – Louis Jordan, jazz musician, 66
- February 10 – Dave Alexander, bassist (The Stooges), 27 (pulmonary edema)
- February 13 – Eric Thiman, English composer, 74
- February 16–- Norman Treigle, operatic bass-baritone, 47
- February 19 – Luigi Dallapiccola, composer, 71
- February 22 – Lionel Tertis, viola player, 98
- March 3 – Sandy MacPherson, theatre organist, 78
- March 4 – Cornel Chiriac, Romanian record producer, broadcaster and jazz musician, 33 (murdered)
- March 14 – Will Mastin, American vaudevillian, 100
- March 15 – Sandy Brown, jazz musician, 46 (heart attack)
- March 16 – T-Bone Walker, African-American musician, 64
- March 27 – Sir Arthur Bliss, Master of the Queen's Musick, 83
- April 12 – Josephine Baker, African-American dancer, 68
- April 14 – Michael Flanders, lyricist, actor, humorist and singer (Flanders and Swann), 53 (intracranial berry aneurysm)
- April 21 – Sir Jack Westrup, musicologist, 70
- April 23 – Pete Ham, singer and songwriter (Badfinger), 27 (suicide)
- May 2 – Conchita Badía, operatic soprano, 77
- May 3 – Sarah Fischer, Canadian soprano (born 1896)
- May 13 – Bob Wills, American Western swing bandleader, 70
- May 18 – Leroy Anderson, American composer and conductor, 66
- June 4 – Frida Leider, operatic soprano, 87
- June 7 – Robert Schmertz, American folk musician and architect, 77
- June 16 – Don Robey, songwriter and producer, 72
- June 21 – David Tamkin, composer, 68
- June 29 – Tim Buckley, singer-songwriter, 28 (drug overdose)
- July 5 – Gilda Dalla Rizza, operatic soprano, 82
- July 10 – Ernst Fischer, composer, 75
- July 14 – Zutty Singleton, American jazz drummer, 77
- July 19 – Lefty Frizzell, Country Music Hall of Fame singer, 47 (stroke)
- August 8 – Cannonball Adderley, American saxophonist, 46
- August 9 – Dmitri Shostakovich, composer, 68 (heart attack)
- August 10 – Neva Carr Glyn, operatic contralto, 67
- September – Flora Perini, operatic soprano, 87
- September 5
  - Georg Ots, Estonian opera singer, 55
  - Bill Sprouse Jr., Christian singer and songwriter, 26 (heart attack)
- September 6 – Shelton Brooks, Canadian-born African American song composer, 89
- September 20 – Vincent Lopez, American bandleader, 79
- October 1 – Al Jackson, Jr., R&B drummer, 39 (shot)
- October 19 – Cátulo Castillo, tango composer, 69
- October 28 – Oliver Nelson, jazz saxophonist, 43
- October 30 – John Scott Trotter, U.S. arranger and conductor
- December 8 – Gary Thain, rock bassist, 27 (heroin overdose)
- December 14 – Mongezi Feza, jazz trumpeter and flautist, 30 (pneumonia)
- December 17
  - Noble Sissle, U.S. bandleader and singer, 86
  - Hound Dog Taylor, blues musician, 60
- December 24
  - Peter Gibbs, violinist
  - Bernard Herrmann, film composer, 64
  - Tilly Losch, dancer and actress, 72
- December 25 – Julio Cueva, trumpeter, bandleader and composer, 78

== Awards ==
=== Grammy Awards ===
- Grammy Awards of 1975

=== Eurovision Song Contest ===
- Eurovision Song Contest 1975

=== Leeds International Piano Competition ===
- Dimitri Alexeev

=== Sangeet Natak Akademi Fellowship ===
- Ravi Shankar
- Zubin Mehta
