= Herbie Armstrong =

Irish guitarist, singer and songwriter

- Born: Herbert Christopher Armstrong; 14 May 1944 (age 81); Bog Meadow, West Belfast, Northern Ireland
- Genres: Rock, pop
- Occupations: Guitarist, singer, songwriter
- Instrument: Guitar
- Formerly of: The Wheels; Screaming Lord Sutch; Fox; Yellow Dog

Herbert Christopher Armstrong (born 14 May 1944) is a Northern Irish guitarist, singer and songwriter. He is known for his collaborations with Kenny Young in the bands Fox and Yellow Dog, and with Van Morrison in the early 1960s and again in the 1980s.

== Career ==
Born in Bog Meadow, West Belfast, he started his musical career there in the early 1960s as guitarist with the Manhattan Showband, alongside his friend Van Morrison. He became a member of the Golden Eagles, who then became The Wheels. The band gained a residency in Blackpool, and wrote and recorded the original version of "Bad Little Woman", later covered in America by The Shadows of Knight. The Wheels split up in 1967.

Armstrong and his bandmate and songwriting partner, singer and bassist Rod Demick, then joined Screaming Lord Sutch's band, known at the time as the Beautiful Quality, for six months in 1967. The following year, the pair left and recorded as the James Brothers, releasing two unsuccessful singles on the Page One label in 1968. Demick and Armstrong continued as a duo under their own names, and released several singles and two albums, Little Willy Ramble (MAM, 1971) and Lookin' Through (A&M, 1972), described by Allmusic reviewer Craig Harris as "impressive".

After a period living in Portugal to raise horses, Armstrong returned to Britain and joined with American songwriter and singer Kenny Young and Australian singer Noosha Fox to form the band Fox. They had several chart hits in the UK, notably "Only You Can" (1974) and "S-S-S-Single Bed" (1976), and released three albums, Fox (1975), Tails of Illusion (1975), and Blue Hotel (1977). Armstrong co-wrote several of the album tracks with Young, who was the main songwriter.

After Noosha left Fox, Armstrong and Young formed a new band, Yellow Dog, with guitarists Andy Roberts and Jim Gannon, bassist Gary Taylor, and drummer Gerry Conway. The band had UK chart hits with "Just One More Night" and "Wait Until Midnight" (both 1978) and released three albums, Yellow Dog (1977), Beware of the Dog (1978), and Strangers in Paradox (1981).

Armstrong then spent several years touring as the guitarist in Van Morrison's band, and played guitar on four of Morrison's albums between 1978 and 1982. In 1985 he released an album under his own name, Back Against the Wall, on the Making Waves label.

=== Britain's Got Talent ===
In 2011, aged 66, he took part in the fifth series of Britain’s Got Talent. After passing the audition, he sang Van Morrison's "Have I Told You Lately". He secured a semi-final place where he sang "Mandy", written by his friend Scott English, but was eliminated from the contest.

== Later life ==
He gave up the music business for several years, and opened a restaurant, Armstrong's, in London. He later moved to Sheffield, where he ran two live venues, before another move to run a pub and live venue in the village of Rowland's Castle near Portsmouth. The following year after his Britain's Got Talent audition, he released a compilation album, Real Real Gone, including the title track, written by Morrison at the time of his album Common One, along with several other Morrison compositions, as well as several by Armstrong and other writers.
