= Sprouse =

Sprouse is a surname. Notable people with the surname include:

- Bill Sprouse Jr. (born 1975), American Christian evangelist and singer
- Chris Sprouse (born 1966), American comic book artist
- Cole Sprouse (born 1992), American actor
- Dylan Sprouse (born 1992), American actor
- Stephen Sprouse (1953–2004), American fashion designer
- Vic Sprouse (contemporary), American politician from West Virginia

== See also ==
- Sprouse-Reitz, also known as Sprouse!, defunct variety store chain based in Portland, Oregon
- Sprouses Corner, Virginia
