= Meal Ticket =

British country rock band

- Origin: London, United Kingdom
- Genres: Country rock, South Coast rock
- Years active: 1970s
- Labels: Logo, EMI international
- Past members: Ray Flacke: Jack Brand; Alan Coulter; Rod Demick; Rick Jones; Chris Hunt; Keith Nelson; Steve Simpson; Willy Finlayson; Steve Hammond

Meal Ticket were a country rock band who emerged from the London pub circuit during the 1970s and signed to Logo Records. They had several line ups which included Ray Flacke, Jack Brand, Alan Coulter, Rod Demick, Chris Hunt, Keith Nelson, Steve Simpson, Willy Finlayson and Rick Jones. Canadian born Jones, who was known for his television appearances on Play School and Fingerbobs, wrote many of their songs. The band performed the theme to the BBC's Play For Today, The Flipside of Dominick Hide (1980), also Another Flip for Dominick which was entitled "You'd Better Believe It Babe". They released three albums, Code Of The Road (1977), Three Times A Day (1977) and Take Away (1978).

== Discography ==
=== Code of the Road (1977) ===
Side One

1. Out of the Blue (4.42) (R Jones / D Pierce / S Hammond) Vocal: Willie Finlayson
2. Keepin' the Faith (6.26) (R Jones / D Pierce / S Hammond) Vocal: Rick Jones
3. OK Bar (Same Old Story) (3.47) (R Jones / D Pierce / S Hammond) Vocal Willie Finlayson
4. Last One to Know (4.31) (S Hammond / R Jones / D Pierce) Vocal: Willie Finlayson
5. Day Job (4.23) (R Jones / D Pierce / S Hammond) Vocal: Rick Jones

Side Two

1. The Man from Mexico (6.47) (R Jones / M Ross) Vocal: Willie Finlayson
2. Snow (3.17) (R Jones / D Pierce) Vocal: Rick Jones
3. Golden Girl (4.21) (R Jones / D Pierce / S Hammond) Vocal: Rick Jones; Willy Finlayson; Steve Simpson
4. Standing on the Wrong Corner (3.24) (R Jones / D Pierce) Vocal: Willie Finlayson
5. Georgia Syncopator (2.57) (R Jones / D Pierce) Vocal: Rick Jones
6. The Code of the Road (Travellers Bible) (1.08) (R Jones / D Pierce) Vocal: Rick Jones

Credits
Steve Simpson: Guitar, Harmonica, Keyboards, Fiddle, Mandolin, Vocals
Willy Finlayson: Guitar, Lead Vocals, Electric Keyboard on The Man from Mexico
Rick Jones: Keyboards, Lead Vocals, Guitar on The Code of the Road
Ray Flacke: Guitar, Vocals
Jack Brand: Bass, Vocals
Chris Hunt: Drums and Percussion
Alby Greenhalgh: saxophone on Day Job

Other credits
Produced by Alan O'Duffy with Willy Finlayson
Engineered by Alan O'Duffy
Recorded January 1977 at The Point, London with assists from M Dunn and B Gaylor
Mixed at Advision, London with assists from Declan O'Doherty
Mastered at the Master Room, London
'Out of the Blue' recorded at Pebble Beach Studios, Worthing, August 1976, Produced by Meal Ticket and Tony Platt, engineered by Tony Platt A Logo Records Production

=== Three Times A Day (1977) ===
Side One

1. This could be the Town (2.36) (B Richardson) Lead Vocal: Willy Finlayson; Guitar solo: Ray Flacke
2. Oh Sister (3.32) (S Simpson / R Jones) Lead Vocal: Steve Simpson Slide guitar Solo: Ray Flacke
3. Last Port of Call (5.54) (R Jones / D Pierce) Lead Vocal: Rick Jones Mandolin: Steve Simpson
4. Comes the Dawn (3.09) (R Jones / D Pierce) Lead Vocal: Willy Finlayson Tenor Saxophone: Don Weller
5. River Man (5.41) (S Simpson) Lead Vocal: Steve Simpson Dobro: Ray Flacke

Side Two

1. Yesterday's Music (3.28) (Clayton-Thomas / W Smith) Lead Vocal: Willy Finlayson Guitar Solo: Steve Simpson
2. Rural Routes (3.18) (D Pierce / R Jones / S Hammond) Lead Vocal: Rick Jones Guitar Solo: Ray Flacke
3. I Wish, I Wish (3.05) (R Jones / D Pierce) Lead Vocal: Rick Jones and Steve Simpson Guitar Solo: Ray Flacke Banjo: Keith Nelson
4. Laughing Daughter (4.00) (R Jones / D Pierce) Lead Vocal: Rick Jones
5. This Dream I Have of You (4.00) (R Jones / D Pierce) Lead Vocal: Willy Finlayson Guitar Solo: Ray Flacke String Arrangement: Ann O'Dell

Credits
Steve Simpson: Lead Vocals, Guitar, Acoustic Guitar, Mandolin, Accordion
Willy Finlayson: Lead Vocals, Guitar
Rick Jones: Lead Vocals, Keyboards
Ray Flacke: Guitar, Acoustic Guitar, DobroVocals
Jack Brand: Bass, Vocals
Chris Hunt: Drums and Percussion

Other credits
Produced by Ritchie Gold / Handle Artists
Recorded and Mixed at Threshold / Decca Studio 1
Engineer Derek Varnals
Assisted by Paul Cooper and Craig Thompson
‘This could be the Town' Recorded at Marquee Studio, Engineer Phil Harding, Mixed at Threshold
‘Yesterday's Music' Recorded and Mixed at Marquee Studio, Engineer John Eden
July and August 1977
Mastered at EMI Abbey Road by Chris Blair A Logo Records Production

=== Take away (1978) ===
Side one

1. Why In The World
2. Down On My Knees
3. Lucy
4. Lonestar Motel
5. The Shape I'm In (R.Robertson)

Side two

1. Blame
2. Simple
3. Bonnie Lee’s Dinette
4. At The Funny Farm
5. Get On Board

Credits
Richard Jones (keyboards/vocals)
Alan Coulter (drums)
Rod Demick (bass)
Willy Finlayson (guitar/keyboards/vocals)
Keith Nelson (banjo)
Steve Simpson (guitar/violin/vocals)
