= S-S-S-Single Bed =

Single by Fox

from the album Blue Hotel
- B-side: "Silk Milk"
- Released: 1976
- Studio: Lazy Sounds
- Genre: Pop
- Length: 3:48
- Label: GTO
- Songwriter: Kenny Young
- Producer: Kenny Young

Fox singles chronology
"Strange Ships" (1975)	"S-S-S-Single Bed" (1976)	"Love Letters" (1976)

"S-S-S-Single Bed" is a song by British-based pop group Fox from their third album Blue Hotel. Written and produced by the group's founder Kenny Young, it became their third and final hit on the UK Singles Chart in May 1976, spending 10 weeks on the chart and reaching a peak of number four. It marked a return to success for Fox, whose second album Tails of Illusion and its single "Strange Ships" had failed to chart. The song was most successful in singer Noosha Fox's native Australia, where it reached number one for four weeks in August 1976.

The song features suggestive lyrics, sung from the perspective of a lady addressing a man who has missed the last train home, warning him "All I've got is a single bed / there ain't no room for your sweet head". Speaking in 1976, Noosha Fox said she considered the song musically the best thing the band had done, describing it as understated. Writing in a review of Cherry Red's The Fox Box for Louder Than War in 2017, Ian Canty described the song as a "submerged but tight funk/reggae backing track with a great hook-line complementing the cool, sultry vocal".

In stage performances the backing singer would use a talk box to produce a distorted effect for the verse

''Baby don't cry

Bye bye baby Baby don't cry

Bye bye baby''

== Other recordings ==
In 1976, a Dutch collective named Het Peleton made a version with Dutch lyrics to celebrate Dutch cyclist Joop Zoetemelk. titled Z.Z.Z. Zoetemelk.

In 2009, Bananarama released their version of the song on their album Viva.

== Charts ==
=== Weekly charts ===
Chart (1976)	Peak position
Australia (Kent Music Report)	1
Belgium (Ultratop 50 Flanders)	12
Ireland (IRMA)	4
Israel (IBA)	21
Netherlands (Dutch Top 40)	10
Netherlands (Single Top 100)	8
UK Singles (OCC)	4

=== Year-end charts ===
Chart (1976)	Position
Australia (Kent Music Report)	8
Belgium (Ultratop)	99
