= The Wheels =

1960s Irish rock band

Background information
- Also known as: The Golden Eagles
- Origin: Belfast, Northern Ireland
- Genres: Rock; R&B; blues; garage rock
- Years active: 1964–1967
- Label: EMI Columbia
- Spinoff of: Them
- Past members: Brian Rossi; Rod Demick; Herbie Armstrong; Tito Tinsley; Victor Catling; Kit Carson; Eric Wrixon; Van Morrison

The Wheels were a 1960s R&B and blues-influenced rock band from Belfast, Northern Ireland, who came from the same music scene that produced the better-known band, Them, led by Van Morrison. Their best-known membership consisted of Brian Rossi (keyboards and vocals), Rod Demick (rhythm guitar and vocals), Herbie Armstrong (lead guitar), Tito Tinsley (bass guitar), and Victor Catling (drums). Morrison briefly joined them live, on saxophone, before they became known as the Wheels. They are best remembered for writing and recording the original version of "Bad Little Woman", later covered in America by The Shadows of Knight.

== History ==
=== Years of activity ===
The band began in 1964, initially known as the Golden Eagles and, for a time, were the house band for the Plaza, a popular local venue. It was during this time that Van Morrison did a brief stint on vocals and saxophone with the band. Later in 1964, not long after changing their name to the Wheels, they were fired from the Plaza, so, in September of that year, they moved to Blackpool in northern England, where they were able to find another club residency and built a strong local following. In 1965, their original rhythm guitarist, Kit Carson, left and was replaced by Rod Demick, formerly of Tony and the Telstars. They were signed to a record deal with EMI Columbia in 1965. Tommy Scott, who had previously worked with Them, would produce their records for the label. at Regent Sound in London, they recorded and released a cover of the Van Morrison-penned "Gloria" in September '65, which had already been recorded by Them, and would later become a big hit in the USA for the blues-based Chicago garage rock band, the Shadows of Knight.

The Wheels later recorded five more songs, two of which would appear on their second single, released in February 1966, featuring "Bad Little Woman." A slightly slower, but more intense, version of the song, taken from an outtake, was released simultaneously in the U.S. on the Aurora label in February 1966. Like "Gloria" before, "Bad Little Woman" would also be covered by The Shadows of Knight. Shortly thereafter, Brian Rossi left the band to be replaced by Eric Wrixon, previously of Them, on keyboards. It was during this time that the Wheels returned to Regent Sound to cut two songs previously recorded by other acts: "Tell Me (I'm Gonna Love Again)" and "Call My Name" a Tommy Scott composition, which would end up as the b-side to their third single "Kicks" released in August 1966. At the end of the year Rossi would return, giving the Wheels a six-member lineup, but the band broke up in early 1967.

=== Later developments ===
Later in 1967 former members Rod Demick and Herbie Armstrong played with Screaming Lord Sutch, and recorded two singles for Page One Records as the James Brothers. In the early 70s, influenced by acts such as Crosby, Stills, Nash, & Young and James Taylor, the two recorded a couple of folk/singer-songwriter albums under the name Rod Demick & Herbie Armstrong. In the late 70s and early 80s, Herbie Armstrong played in Van Morrison's band, both live and in the studio. In 1980, as a solo artist, he recorded an early version of the Van Morrison-penned "Real Real Gone," which Morrison would subsequently record and release as his own version ten years later. In the intervening years, Demick also played with the Strawbs, as well as David Essex. He currently plays with Paul Lamb & the King Snakes. In 1984 former lead singer Brian Rossi died.

== Personnel ==
- Brian Rossi (organ and vocals) (born Brendon Brian Rosebotham, 23 July 1935, Belfast, County Antrim, Northern Ireland d. 7 October 1984, Blackpool, Lancashire)
- Rod Demick (rhythm guitar and vocals) (born Roderick Joseph Demick, 17 May 1947, Prestatyn, Flintshire, North Wales)
- Herbie Armstrong (lead guitar) (born Herbert Christopher Armstrong, 14 May 1944, Belfast, County Antrim, Northern Ireland)
- Tito Tinsley (bass) (born William Tinsley, 14 October 1944, Belfast, County Antrim, Northern Ireland
- Victor 'Vic' Catling (drums) (born Victor Frederick George Catling, 30 August 1945, Belfast, County Antrim, Northern Ireland
- Kit Carson (rhythm guitar) (born 1944/1945)
- Eric Wrixon (organ)

== Discography ==
- "Gloria"/"Don't You Know" (EMI Columbia DB 7682, Rel. Sept. 1965)
- "Bad Little Woman" (A-side to second single, EMI Columbia DB 7827, February 1966)
- "Bad Little Woman" (A-side to US release as the Wheel-a-ways, Aurora 157, Feb. 1966)
- "Call My Name" (b-side to third single, EMI Columbia DB 7981, also shows up on some promo copies of their second single mislabeled as "Road Block")
