= Nicky James =

- Born: 2 April 1943; Tipton, Staffordshire, England
- Died: 8 October 2007 (aged 64)
- Genres: Blues; Rock; Psychedelic; Mod; Country music
- Years active: 1960s–2000s
- Labels: Columbia Records; Philips Records; Threshold Records
- Formerly of: Moody Blues; Led Zeppelin; The Move; Wizzard

Nicky James (2 April 1943 – 8 October 2007), born Michael Clifford Nicholls, was a British musician and songwriter.

== Biography ==
James was born in Tipton, Staffordshire, England. He attended Park Lane School, and at age sixteen moved to Scunthorpe, Lincolnshire. After moving to Birmingham he first performed with various musical acts involved in the early "Brumbeat" scene.

James led the early 1960s band the Lawmen before joining Denny Laine and the Diplomats in early 1963; the band was soon renamed Nicky James with Denny Laine and the Diplomats. After attracting the attention of Pye Records producer Tony Hatch, Nicky left the Diplomats in the autumn of 1963 to record a solo single, "My Colour is Blue." He continued to play in a number of bands, including the mod band The Jamesons alongside John Walker (a.k.a. John Maus) of the Walker Brothers. Soon, James re-united with former Diplomats in a new group, The Moody Blues 5. Two months after James's departure, the band shortened their name to The Moody Blues, signed to Decca Records, and had their first UK No. 1 hit at the end of 1964 with "Go Now".

Signing to Columbia Records under the name the Nicky James Movement, James's new project debuted in 1965 with a single version of "Stagger Lee". Among the rotating membership of The Nicky James Movement were John Bonham, later the drummer for Led Zeppelin, as well as Bev Bevan of ELO, Mike Pinder of The Moody Blues, and Roy Wood of The Move.

James then moved to Philips Records for 1967's "So Glad We Made It". Four singles followed: "Would You Believe", "Nobody But Me", "Time" and "Reaching For The Sun". James made his full-length debut with 1971's Nicky James. While doubling as a talent scout for Dick James Music publishers in 1966–67, Nicky James signed the newly formed team of Bernie Taupin and Elton John as staff-writers.

In 1972, James signed to the Moody Blues's Threshold Records, and released two more albums: Every Home Should Have One (1973) and Thunderthroat (1976), as well as four further singles, including "Black Dream" in 1972 and "Maggie" in 1976. On 20 August 1973, the Nicky James Band recorded for John Peel's radio show on BBC Radio 1.

James appeared on solo albums by Moody Blues members Graeme Edge and Ray Thomas, including From Mighty Oaks (1975) and Hopes Wishes and Dreams (1976). He also co-wrote songs with Allan Clarke of The Hollies and Graham Nash of CSNY.

John Bonham of Led Zeppelin described Nicky James as "an incredible singer . . . he could sing any style . . . [and] he had a big following." Bev Bevan of ELO recalled his first encounter with James: "a tall, skinny, good-looking guy with a mop of Brylcreemed black hair, swept back Teddy Boy style . . . he launched into Elvis Presley's One Night With You. He was sensational." NME described James as displaying a "perfected vocal technique that melded the blues with prevalent beat pop tendencies."

James continued to write and perform well into the 21st century; after relocating to Aldbourne in Wiltshire, he founded Stable Studios and continued his prolific recorded output.

He appeared in the 2006 documentary Classic Artists: The Moody Blues, and was working on a new record when he died from complications following a brain tumour, on 8 October 2007. He left a wife, Martine, and children, Sami and Louis.

== Discography ==
=== Singles ===
- "My Colour is Blue" / "Take Me Back" (September 1963, Pye 15560)
- "Stagger Lee" / "I'm Hurtin' Inside" (November 1965, Columbia DB 7747)
- "I Need To Be Needed" / "So Glad We Made It" (April 1967, Philips BF 1566)
- "Would You Believe" / "Silver Butterfly" (January 1968, Philips BF 1635)
- "Looking Through Windows" / "Nobody But Me" (August 1968, Philips BF 1694)
- "Time" / "Little Bit of Paper" (1969, Philips BF 1755)
- "Reaching for the Sun" / "No Life at All" (1969, Philips BF 1804)
- "Black Dream" / "She Came to Me" (1972, Threshold 67014)
- "My Style" / "I Guess I've Always Loved You" (1972, Threshold 67016)
- "Why" / "Foreign Shore" (1972, Threshold THS12)
- "Rock & Roll Jamboree" / "Doctor, Doctor" (1973, Threshold 67017)
- "Maggie" / "Bottle of Cheap Red Wine" (1976, Threshold THS25)

=== Solo albums ===
- Nicky James – 1971 (Philips)
- Every Home Should Have One – (1973, Threshold THS10)
- Thunderthroat – (1976, Threshold THS19)
- Black Country Boy (unreleased, in-progress at time of death)

=== Collaborations ===
- John Walker – "Annabella" / "You Don't Understand Me" (1967, Philips BF 1593) (co-written with Graham Nash and Kirk Duncan)
- Ray Thomas – From Mighty Oaks (Threshold, 1975)
- Ray Thomas – Hopes, Wishes, and Dreams (Threshold, 1976)

=== Peel sessions ===
- With The Nicky James Band – "Rock n' Roll Jamboree", "I Guess I've Always Loved You", "A Bottle of Cheap Red Wine", "My Style" (20 August 1973, transmitted 30 August 1973)
