= Imagine Me, Imagine You =

- Cover of the song's sheet music

Single by Fox

from the album Fox
- B-side: "If I Point at the Moon"
- Released: 2 May 1975
- Genre: Pop
- Label: GTO Records
- Songwriter: Kenny Young
- Producer: Kenny Young

Fox singles chronology
"Only You Can" (1974)	"Imagine Me, Imagine You" (1975)	"He's Got Magic" (1975)

"Imagine Me, Imagine You" is a 1975 song by pop group Fox. Written by the group's founder Kenny Young, it was taken from their debut album Fox. It reached no. 15 on the UK Singles Chart in June 1975, becoming the band's third highest charting single and ultimately spending 8 weeks in the chart. However, the song reached its highest chart peak on the German chart where it reached no. 7.

Amongst contemporary reviews, Sue Byrom of Record Mirror described 'Imagine Me, Imagine You' as "quite different [to "Only You Can"] and extremely catchy", while Peter Trollope of Liverpool Echo praised Noosha Fox's vocals and described it as "another excellent record" from "one of the best bands to have appeared on the scene in a long time". Reviewing Cherry Red's The Fox Box for Louder Than War in 2017, Ian Canty described the song as "gentle, unusual brilliance".

== Track listing ==
=== 7" Single ===
No.	Title	Length
1.	"Imagine Me, Imagine You"	3:40
2.	"If I Point At The Moon"	2:50

== Charts ==
Chart (1975)	Peak Position
United Kingdom	15
Germany	7
