= The Flipside of Dominick Hide =

- Play for Today episode
- Opening title
- Episode no.: Series 11; Episode 8
- Directed by: Alan Gibson
- Written by: Jeremy Paul, Alan Gibson, from an idea by Alan Gibson
- Original air date: 9 December 1980
- Running time: 90 minutes

"The Flipside of Dominick Hide" is a British television play first transmitted on BBC1 on 9 December 1980 as part of the Play for Today series.

Peter Firth stars in the title role as a time traveller from Earth's future who illegally visits the London of 1980 to search for an 'ancestor' and finds a world very different from the one he left behind. The story concludes with a plot twist involving a causal loop, a popular concept in time-travel fiction.

== Plot summary ==
In 2130, Earth has attained a clean, safe and anaesthetised future. Dominick is a time traveller whose job is to observe transport systems on the 'flipside' – the era before the Time Barrier was broken. Dominick's 'Circuit' (the period in time and space he must observe) is London 1980, where he believes he may have an ancestor – his great-great-grandfather, also named Dominick Hide. Breaking the rules, Dominick lands on the flipside to search for his great-great-grandfather.

London of 1980 is a different place to London of 2130 and Dominick is unprepared for the amazing culture shock of Portobello Road. He has no money and almost no idea how to behave. He concocts a story about finding a 'distant relative' and to avoid suspicion, calls himself Gilbey, after a brand of gin. While he is on the flipside, he relies on the kindness of strangers, including the owner of a clothes shop, Jane Winters.

After an unsuccessful visit to the flipside, Dominick returns to 2130 determined to try again. Dominick tells his wife, Ava, that he plans to visit the flipside again. She is upset and confused and asks him not to go. Despite the risks involved and the promise of trouble from his superior, Caleb Line, Dominick revisits the flipside. While he is there and against all sense, Dominick begins a relationship with Jane.

Dominick has still not found his great-great-grandfather but now his visits seem to be more concerned with seeing Jane than with finding the elusive 1980 Dominick. They spend a weekend together at a guest house in Herne Bay where his flying saucer has been taken. As a result, Jane becomes pregnant. When Dominick learns this, he goes to Caleb Line to own up.

Caleb reveals that he was aware, all the time, of what Dominick was doing. He sanctioned it because Dominick Hide is the victim of a "genetic time-slip" – he is his own ancestor. The child Jane is carrying will be Dominick's great-grandfather.

Caleb tells Dominick that further landings on the flipside will not be permitted, officially, implying that he trusts Dominick enough to turn a blind eye to further landings. Having narrowly avoided causing a fatal accident on a previous landing, Dominick realises the danger involved, and decides to visit the flipside once more, where he provides for Jane and his son by acquiring for them the following week's newspaper, from which Jane can use the football results to win on the pools. He explains that this will be the last time he can visit the flipside and says a sad farewell to his own great-great-grandmother. Jane watches Dominick take off in his flying saucer, convinced at last that his story is true. The closing scenes show Jane filming her son Dominick at Herne Bay in 1988, and Dominick and Ava walking and laughing in the surf at the Herne Bay of 2130 with their own baby.

== Cast ==
- Peter Firth – Dominick Hide
- Caroline Langrishe – Jane
- Pippa Guard – Ava
- Patrick Magee – Caleb Line
- Trevor Ray – Alaric
- Sylvia Coleridge – Great Aunt Mavis
- Jean Trend – Helda
- Timothy Davies – Jim Bone
- Denis Lawson – Felix
- Bernadette Shortt – Midge
- Tony Melody – Harry
- Bill Gavin – Brian
- David Griffin – Karl
- Karl Howman – Geoffrey
- Jenny Donnison – Carole
- Michael Carter – 1st Youth
- Phil Davis – 2nd Youth
- Mark Wingett – 3rd Youth
- Nicholas McArdle – Policeman
- Sylvia Brayshay – Ida
- Colin Cunningham – Gordon
- David Beale – Barman
- Gary Bramble – Jonathan
- Sarah Carthy – Anxious Mother
- Ysanne Churchman – Soo (voice)
- Myrtle Devenish – Market Woman
- James Gilbey – George
- Andrew MacLaughlan – Commuter
- Jason Savage – Young Dominick
- James R B Dennis - Couples baby at end of film
- Robert Spencer – Hologram Musician
- Roderick Skeaping – Hologram Musician
- Andrew van der Beek – Hologram Musician
- Mitchell Dalton – Guitarist

== Music ==
The play's theme, "You'd Better Believe It, Babe" was written by Rick Jones, and performed by his band, Meal Ticket.

== Another Flip for Dominick ==
The play was successful enough for a sequel to be commissioned and Another Flip for Dominick was broadcast in 1982. The original play was repeated the week before the sequel aired. Neither play was shown again on British television until 26 February 2006, when The Flipside of Dominick Hide was broadcast on BBC Four to tie in with a series of programmes about time. Talking Pictures TV subsequently broadcast The Flipside of Dominick Hide on 13 April 2026. The two dramas were released as a double VHS video pack in 1991 and on region 2 DVD in 2005.
