= Yellow Dog (band) =

British based rock band

- Genres: Rock, pop
- Years active: 1977–1981
- Spinoff of: Fox
- Past members: Kenny Young; Herbie Armstrong; Jim Gannon; Andy Roberts; Gary Taylor; Gerry Conway; Phil Palmer; Mo Foster; Peter Van Hooke; Rod Demick

Yellow Dog were a British-based rock band from the 1970s, best known for their one-hit wonder song "Just One More Night".

== History ==
Founded by the American songwriter Kenny Young, along with most of the members from his previous band Fox, the band enjoyed a solitary domestic Top 10 hit in the UK Singles Chart in 1978 with "Just One More Night". The single was written and produced by Young. It ends on a humorous note with a telephone call in which the protagonist (a woman) continues to beg to be allowed to stay "just one more night" after being told emphatically "No!". Yellow Dog's only other successful song that appeared in the UK Singles Chart was "Wait Until Midnight" (No. 54). They made an appearance playing one song, "Gee Officer Krupke", on The Kenny Everett Video Show. The band were managed by John Morris, at the time the husband of singer Clodagh Rodgers. The band released LPs and singles throughout the late 1970s and early 1980s, but none of them could compete with the success of "Just One More Night", and by 1981, the band quietly disbanded.

== Discography ==
=== Studio albums ===
List of albums, with Australian chart positions
Title	Album details	Peak chart positions
Title	Album details	AUS
Yellow Dog	Released: 1977; Format: LP; Label: Virgin (V 2083)	—
Beware of the Dog	Released: 1978; Format: LP; Label: Virgin (V 2104)	50
Strangers in Paradox	Released: 1981; Format: LP; Label: Raf Records (DISON 3305)	—
"—" denotes releases that did not chart.

=== Singles ===
List of singles, with selected chart positions
Year	Title	Peak chart positions	
Year	Title	UK	AUS
1977	"City Bird" / "For Whatever It's Worth"	—	—
1977	"For Whatever It's Worth" / "So Alive"	—	—
1977	"Stood Up" / "California Here I Don't Come"	—	—
1978	"Just One More Night" / "Up in the Balcony"	8	6
1978	"Wait Until Midnight" / "Down at the Vortex"	54	74
1978	"Little Gods" / "Fat Johnny"	—	—
1978	"Gee Officer Krupke" / "Fat Johnny"	—	—
1981	"Escape" / "Thalia and the Stickboys" / "Media Madness"	—	—
"—" denotes releases that did not chart or were not released in that territory.

== Personnel ==
- Kenny Young – guitar, percussion, vocals
- Herbie Armstrong – guitar, vocals
- Jim Gannon – guitar
- Andy Roberts – guitar, mandolin
- Gary Taylor – bass, vocals
- Gerry Conway – drums, percussion
- Phil Palmer – guitar
- Mo Foster – bass
- Peter Van Hooke – drums
- Rod Demick – bass, vocals
