= Ray Flacke =

British musician

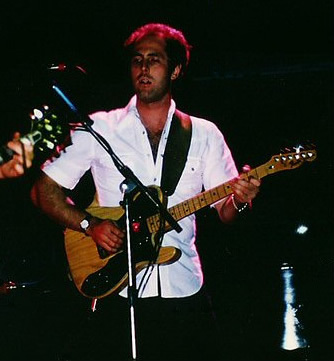
- Ray Flacke in Meal Ticket (1976)

Background information
- Born: Raymond James Flacke; 11 February 1948 (age 78); Milford on Sea, England
- Genres: Country, Rock, Acoustic
- Occupations: Studio musician, Songwriter
- Instrument: Guitar
- Years active: 1959–present

Raymond James Flacke (born 11 February 1948) is a country guitar session player from Milford on Sea, England. He has graced countless recordings with his trademark ‘‘Tele-wielding Chicken pickin’’’ style for such artists as Emmylou Harris, Janie Frickie, Kathy Mattea, Lacy J. Dalton, Marty Stuart, Patty Loveless, Ricky Skaggs and Travis Tritt.

== As an educator ==
Flacke has been at the forefront of sharing his guitar styles and technique for such music publishing companies as Hal Leonard Corporation, Homespun Tapes and Star Licks Productions.

== Discography ==
=== Solo albums ===
- Untitled Island
- Songs Without Words

=== Featured appearances ===
Year	Title	Artist	Instrument(s)
2006	I've Always Needed You	Emmylou Harris	Guitar (Electric)
2005	Waitin' for the Sun to Shine/Highways & Heartaches	Ricky Skaggs	Guitar (Electric)
2004	Best Of You Can't Hear Me Callin' Bluegrass: 80 Years of American Music	Various	Guitar (Electric)
2004	Can't You Hear Me Callin' - Bluegrass: 80 Years of American Music	Various	Guitar (Electric)
2003	Essential Ricky Skaggs	Ricky Skaggs	Guitar (Electric)
2001	Tribute to John Hartford: Live From Mountain Stage	The Jamie Hartford Band	Guitar (Electric)
2001	Live at Gibson's Café (Nashville)	The Jamie Hartford Band	Guitar (Electric)
2001	Anthology: The Warner/Reprise Years	Emmylou Harris	Guitar (Electric)
2001	When in Texas [2000]	Sonny Burgess	Guitar (Electric)
2000	Down the Road I Go	Travis Tritt	Guitar (Electric)
2000	Nashville Guitars	Various	Guitar (Electric)
1999	Country: The American Tradition	Various	Guitar (Electric)
1998	Shine On	Gove Scrivenor	Guitar (Electric)
1997	What About Yes	The Jamie Hartford Band	Guitar (Electric)
1996	Nashville Country Duets	Emmylou Harris	Guitar (Electric)
1996	Portraits	Emmylou Harris	Guitar (Electric)
1995	Gospel Album	Vern Gosdin	Guitar (Electric), Guitar (Acoustic)
1991	Smithsonian Collection of Classic Country Music, Vol. 4	Various	Guitar (Electric)
1991	Tempted	Marty Stuart	Guitar (Electric)
1991	True Love & Other Short Stories	Pat Alger	Guitar (Electric)
1990	Collection of Hits	Kathy Mattea	Guitar (Electric), Guitar (Acoustic)
1988	All Broken Hearts Are the Same	Robin & Linda Williams	Guitar (Electric), (Gut String Guitar)
1988	For a Lifetime	David Mallett	Guitar (Electric)
1987	Untasted Honey	Kathy Mattea	Guitar (Electric), Guitar (Acoustic)
1987	Patty Loveless	Patty Loveless	Guitar (Electric), Guitar (Acoustic)
1987	Hard Times on Easy Street	David Lynn Jones	Guitar (Electric)
1986	Jimmy C. Newman & Cajun Country	Jimmy C. Newman	Guitar (Electric), Guitar (Acoustic)
1986	Walk the Way the Wind Blows	Kathy Mattea	Guitar (Electric)
1985	Ballad of Sally Rose	Emmylou Harris	Guitar (Electric)
1985	Favorite Country Songs	Ricky Skaggs	Guitar (Electric)
1983	Don't Cheat in Our Hometown	Ricky Skaggs	Guitar (Electric)
1983	Don't Cheat in Our Hometown [CD/DVD]	Ricky Skaggs	Guitar (Electric), Performer
1983	Dream Baby	Lacy J. Dalton	Guitar (Electric)
1982	Highways & Heartaches	Ricky Skaggs	Guitar (Electric)
1981	Waitin' for the Sun to Shine	Ricky Skaggs	Guitar (Electric)
1980	Bombed, Boozed, and Busted	Joe Sun	Guitar (Electric)
1979	Out Of Your Mind	Joe Sun	Guitar (Electric)
1978	Three Times a Day	Meal Ticket	Guitar (Electric), Vocals
1977	Code of the Road	Meal Ticket	Guitar (Electric), Vocals
1976	Nothing to Do With Us	Goodies	Guitar (Electric)
1976	Tiger	Tiger	Guitar (Electric)
1972	Third World War II	Third World War II	Guitar (Electric)
