= Fox (album) =

Studio album by Fox
- Released: 17 May 1975
- Genre: Pop
- Label: GTO
- Producer: Kenny Young

Fox chronology
Fox (1975)	Tails of Illusion (1975)

Fox is the debut album by the band of the same name released 17 May 1975. The cover photography was by Gered Mankowitz.

Songwriter Kenny Young had worked off and on with the Australian singer Susan Traynor on one of his solo albums, Last Stage For Silverworld, where she was listed as 'Amanda'. Young had written Reparata and the Delrons' "Captain of Your Ship", which had been a UK hit, and in order to create a similar vehicle for Young's songwriting, Traynor was renamed exotically, Noosha, and given the helm of his glam rock band, Fox. The band's self-titled debut album was released on GTO Records in 1975 to critical acclaim. The lead single, "Only You Can", was a Top 10 hit in the UK Singles Chart, the follow-up "Imagine Me, Imagine You" later the same year also reached the Top 20 and "He's Got Magic" was a hit in some European countries. The track "Love Ship" was played extensively on Radio Caroline.

Professional ratings
Review scores
Source	Rating
Allmusic	link

== Track listing ==
All songs by Kenny Young unless noted.

1. "Love Letters" (Edward Heyman, Victor Young)
2. "Imagine Me, Imagine You"
3. "The Juggler" (Herbie Armstrong, Kenny Young)
4. "Patient Tigers" (Armstrong, Kenny Young)
5. "Only You Can"
6. "The More"
7. "Spirit"
8. "He's Got Magic"
9. "Pisces' Babies"
10. "Love Ship"
11. "Red Letter Day" (Armstrong, Kenny Young)

== Personnel ==
- Noosha Fox - lead vocals
- Herbie Armstrong - guitar, vocals
- Kenny Young - guitar, vocals
- Jim Gannon - guitar, vocals
- Gary Taylor - bass, vocals
- Peter Solley - keyboards, vocals
- Jim Frank - drums, percussion, vocals

=== Additional personnel ===
- B. J. Cole
- Chris Gunning
- Dean Parks
- Jim Gannon
- Jim Horn
- Lee Sklar
- Russ Kunkel
