= Rod Demick =

Musical artist (born 1947)

- Born: Roderick Demick; 17 May 1947 (age 78); Prestatyn, Wales
- Origin: Belfast, Northern Ireland
- Genres: Rock; pop
- Occupation: Musician
- Instruments: Bass; harmonica; guitar; vocals
- Formerly of: The Wheels; Bees Make Honey; Meal Ticket; The Strawbs; The Yardbirds

Roderick Demick (born 17 March 1947) is a British guitarist and bassist who has played with many leading musicians.

== Life and career ==
Born in Prestatyn in north Wales, Demick moved with his parents to Belfast, Northern Ireland, aged 5. He learned guitar and at the age of 11 joined his first band, the Vibros, who later became the Telstars (or Tony and the Telstars). In 1963 he joined another Belfast band, The Wheels, and moved with them to England the following year. With Demick on rhythm guitar, harmonica and vocals, the band released several singles, including "Bad Little Woman", later recorded by The Shadows of Knight, and supported visiting American musicians such as John Lee Hooker.

After the Wheels broke up in 1967, Demick and his bandmate, lead guitarist Herbie Armstrong, joined Screaming Lord Sutch's band, known at the time as the Beautiful Quality, for six months. The following year, the pair left and recorded as the James Brothers, releasing two unsuccessful singles on the Page One label in 1968. Demick and Armstrong continued as a duo under their own names, toured with a band, and released several singles and two albums, Little Willy Ramble (MAM, 1971) and Lookin' Through (A&M, 1972), described by Allmusic reviewer Craig Harris as "impressive".

Demick worked as a session musician in the 1970s. In 1973, he joined influential pub rock band Bees Make Honey, but the album recorded by that line-up of the band was unreleased and the band split up in 1974. Demick reunited with Herbie Armstrong in 1978, in the band Yellow Dog. He then joined the band Meal Ticket, toured with them and appeared on their 1978 album Take Away, before working with singer-songwriter Ian Gomm, touring the US with Gomm as support act for Dire Straits, and appearing on two of Gomm's albums, What a Blow and Village Voice.

Demick joined David Essex's band as bassist in the early 1980s, touring with Essex for several years and appearing on the 1983 album The Whisper. He also played with Ron Kavana, before joining the Strawbs in 1985 as replacement for John Ford. He continued as a member of the Strawbs until 1998, also playing with their spin-off blues band, Turkey Leg Johnson, and in several bands led by Jim McCarty, including the Yardbirds at the time of their 1992 reunion performances. Other musicians with whom he has performed include Dr. John, Billy Ocean, and Taj Mahal.

In the early 1990s, Demick joined the Paul Lamb Blues Band. After finally leaving the Strawbs, he became a permanent member of Paul Lamb and the King Snakes in 1999.
