= Hopes, Wishes and Dreams =

Studio album by Ray Thomas
- Released: 3 June 1976
- Recorded: 1 February – April 1976 at Threshold Studios, London
- Genre: Progressive rock; folk rock; soft rock
- Length: 39:51
- Label: Threshold/Decca
- Producer: Ray Thomas in association with Derek Varnals

Ray Thomas chronology
From Mighty Oaks (1975)	Hopes, Wishes and Dreams (1976)

Back cover

Hopes, Wishes and Dreams is the second and final solo album by Ray Thomas of The Moody Blues in conjunction with Nicky James and the orchestral arrangements of Terry James, released under The Moody Blues own Threshold Label as THS17 in June 1976. The album was also available in cassette and cartridge. It was reissued on Compact Disc in September 1989 and as part of a box set in 2010. The album produced one single, "One Night Stand" (B-side "Carousel"), which was released in July 1976 in the UK and August 1976 in the United States.

AllMusic stated in its review of the album, "This is also one of the best-sounding records to come from the Moody Blues' orbit, and is proof of the value of the time they put into building Threshold Studios."

== Track listing ==
All songs co-written by Ray Thomas and Nicky James, except where noted.

Hopes, Wishes and Dreams track listing
No.	Title	Length
1.	"In Your Song" (written by Nicky James)	4:30
2.	"Friends"	2:57
3.	"We Need Love"	4:17
4.	"Within Your Eyes"	3:27
5.	"One Night Stand"	3:37
6.	"Keep On Searching"	4:52
7.	"Didn't I"	3:46
8.	"Migration"	3:41
9.	"Carousel"	3:52
10.	"The Last Dream" (written by Ray Thomas)	4:52
Total length:		39:51

== Chart positions ==
=== Album ===
Year	Chart	Position
1976	Billboard 200	147

=== Personnel ===
Musicians

- Ray Thomas – flute, bass flute, harmonica, lead vocals, backing vocals
- Nicky James – backing vocals
- John Jones – acoustic guitar, electric guitar, backing vocals
- Trevor Jones – bass guitar, backing vocals
- Mike Moran – keyboards
- Graham Deakin – drums, percussion
- Barry St. John – backing vocals
- Liza Strike – backing vocals
- Helen Chappelle – backing vocals
- Terry James – orchestral arrangements

Production, recording etc.

- Ray Thomas – producer
- Derek Varnals – associate producer, recording engineer
- Dave Baker – recording engineer
- Phil Travers – illustration and design
- Gered Mankowitz – photography
