= Fox (band) =

British pop band

- Origin: United Kingdom
- Genres: Pop, rock
- Years active: 1974–1981
- Label: GTO
- Past members: Noosha Fox; Kenny Young; Herbie Armstrong; Jim Gannon; Peter Solley; Gary Taylor; Mike Lavender; Jim Frank

Fox were a British-based pop band popular in the mid-1970s. Led by American songwriter and record producer Kenny Young, the band was perhaps best known for its charismatic Australian lead singer Noosha Fox. They had three top 20 hits on the UK Singles Chart – "Only You Can" and "Imagine Me, Imagine You" in 1975 and "S-S-S-Single Bed" in 1976, and Noosha Fox had a solo hit in 1977 with "Georgina Bailey".

== Band history ==
The band was founded by Young, who had composed the song "Under the Boardwalk" for the Drifters in 1964. Young had worked off and on with the Australian singer Susan Traynor on one of his solo albums, Last Stage For Silverworld, where she was listed as 'Amanda' after Young had written Reparata and the Delrons' "Captain of Your Ship", which had been a UK hit.

Young then discovered Northern Irish singer Clodagh Rodgers on a television show, who had recently released the single, "Play The Drama till The End". The partnership produced hit singles over a three-year period, beginning with "Come Back and Shake Me". With this, Rodgers became something of a showcase for the group, as she recorded demos of some of the songs which would eventually surface on the first Fox album in 1975, as well as earlier Young tunes. Rodgers' husband John Morris was the first manager of the group.

Meanwhile, Traynor was in a folk group called Wooden Horse, which released two albums before breaking up. After his success with Rogers, Young founded Fox with Irish singer Herbie Armstrong, recruiting Traynor as lead singer. She adopted the stage name 'Noosha', a scrambled version of her own name, and a glamorous image inspired by Marlene Dietrich, wearing elegant dresses to contrast with the scruffy look of the rest of the group.

The band's self-titled debut album was released on GTO Records in 1975 to critical acclaim. The lead single, "Only You Can", was originally released in mid-1974 under the title "Only You" and failed to chart, but was reissued at the beginning of 1975 with a word added to its title and was a Top 10 hit in the UK Singles Chart. The follow-up "Imagine Me, Imagine You" later the same year also reached the Top 20 and "He's Got Magic" was a hit in some European countries such as Germany, where it reached #48. The track "Love Ship" was played extensively on Radio Caroline, and was subsequently adopted as one of their theme tunes in the 1970s. Shortly after the release of their first album, Fox made a cameo appearance in the film Side by Side.

However, Noosha shared vocals with other members of the band in 1975 follow-up album, Tails of Illusion, with the songs sung by Noosha, Young, Frank, and Armstrong. The album enjoyed some cult critical acclaim but not the sales success of its predecessor; without Noosha's distinctive voice, casual listeners did not associate the songs with the band that had recorded "Only You Can". Roger Taylor of Queen added backing vocals to the song "Survival".

The band returned to the charts in April 1976 when "S-S-S-Single Bed" was a Top 5 UK hit, and topped the Australian chart. (Bananarama did their own version of this song in 2009 on their album Viva.) Again, the band did not attempt to capitalise upon its previous success, and the accompanying album Blue Hotel (1977), yielded only one further single, even though Noosha was the lead singer on all its tracks.

Noosha Fox left the band after Blue Hotel. Armstrong and Young continued to work together in the band Yellow Dog. Their second single for Virgin became the first hit single that Virgin Records released, "Just One More Night" making it to No. 8 on the UK Singles Chart. After a short period of success, Armstrong went on to work with Van Morrison, and Solley later joined Procol Harum. Noosha launched a solo career, and her first single, "Georgina Bailey", written and produced by Young, briefly entered the Top 40 in the UK Singles Chart (reaching number 31) in 1977.

In 1979, Noosha Fox tried to restart her solo career with a single, "The Heat Is On" (a song written by Florrie Palmer and Tony Ashton), on Chrysalis Records. A later version of the song, by ABBA's Agnetha Fältskog, was a European hit four years later. Noosha recorded several singles in the early 1980s for the Earlobe label but none were successful, and she evidently retired from the music industry, although she did not return to Australia.

Fox reformed briefly in 1980, releasing the new wave-influenced "Electro People", written as the theme music for the Kenny Everett Show in 1981. The band considered a reunion in the early 1990s, but the tracks recorded at this time were unreleased until 2004, when they appeared as bonus tracks on the Tails of Illusion CD.

== After the band ==
In 2007, it was reported, on BBC Radio 4's The Music Group, that Noosha Fox was working on new material. An unreleased track from that time called "Judy Blue" is available via YouTube Music. In April 2011, her son Ben Goldacre confirmed that she is actively making music but no more new material has been released.

Herbie Armstrong recently tried to find solo success, appearing on the 2011 series of Britain's Got Talent. He made it through to the live semi-finals but did not make it through to the final. In his semi-final, he appeared singing a version of Barry Manilow's hit, "Mandy".

== Members ==
- Noosha Fox – vocals
- Kenny Young – guitar, vocals
- Herbie Armstrong – guitar, vocals
- Jim Gannon – lead guitar, vocals
- Pete Solley – keyboards, vocals
- Mike Lavender – accordion, electric piano
- Gary Taylor – bass, vocals
- Jim Frank – drums, percussion, vocals

== Discography ==
=== Albums ===
Year	Title	Format	Label	Catalogue ref	Chart position
1975	Fox	12-inch LP	GTO	GTLP 001	No. 7 UK
1975	Tails of Illusion	12-inch LP	GTO	GTLP 006	
1975	Pop Power – The Fantastic Fox	12-inch LP	POLYDOR	2459 302	compilation
1976	S-S-S-Single Bed (European version)	12-inch LP	GTO	GTLP 011	compilation
1976	S-S-S-Single Bed (Australian version)	12-inch LP	GTO	2321 111	No. 22 AUS
1977	Blue Hotel	12-inch LP	GTO	GTLP 020	
1996	Only You Can	CD	WISE BUY	WB 866 702	compilation, including unreleased material
1997	The Very Best of Fox	CD	THE HIT LABEL	AHLCD 51	compilation
2002	Fox (plus four bonus tracks)	CD	CHERRY RED	CDMRED 222	
2004	Tails of Illusion (plus two bonus tracks)	CD	CHERRY RED	CDMRED 263	
2006	Blue Hotel (plus one bonus track)	CD	CHERRY RED	CDMRED 272	
2014	Images '74-'84 - Deluxe Edition	2×CD	CHERRY RED	CDBRED 605	35 tracks including all 7 singles A and B sides
2017	The Fox Box	4CD	CHERRY RED	CRCDMBOX 28	Fox (+4) + Tails of Illusion (+2) + Blue Hotel (+1) + Images - A Collection (from "Images '74-'84")

=== Singles ===
Year	Single	Format	Label	Catalogue ref	Chart positions				
Year	Single	Format	Label	Catalogue ref	UK	AUS	US	DE	NL
1974	"Only You" / "Out of My Body"	7-inch single	GTO	GT 5	-	-	-	-	-
1975	"Only You Can" / "Out of My Body" (Reissue)	7-inch single	GTO	GT 8	3	68	53	2	-
1975	"Imagine Me, Imagine You" / "If I Point at the Moon"	7-inch single	GTO	GT 21	15	16	53	7	-
1975	"He's Got Magic" / "Love Ship"	7-inch single	GTO	GT 37	-	-	-	-	-
1975	"He's Got Magic" / "The Juggler"	7-inch single	GTO	PSC 418	-	-	-	-	-
1975	"Strange Ships" / "Little Brown Box"	7-inch single	GTO	GT 41	-	-	-	-	-
1975	"He's Got Magic" / "Strange Ships"	7-inch single	GTO	2099 151	-	-	-	-	-
1976	"S-S-S-Single Bed" / "Silk Milk"	7-inch single	GTO	GT 57	4	1	-	-	10
1976	Love Letters: "Love Letters" ~ "The Juggler" / "Only You Can" ~ "Spirit"	7-inch EP	GTO	2206 101	-	-	-	-	-
1977	"My Old Man's Away" / "Are You Sure?"	7-inch single	GTO	GT 94	-	-	-	-	-
1981	"Electro People" / "If You Don't Want My Peaches"	7-inch single	BBC	RESL 115	-	-	-	-	-
