= From Mighty Oaks =

Studio album by Ray Thomas
- Released: 11 July 1975
- Recorded: 1974–1975
- Genre: Progressive rock; British folk rock; soft rock
- Length: 42:19
- Label: Threshold/Decca
- Producer: Ray Thomas & Derek Varnals

Ray Thomas chronology
From Mighty Oaks (1975)	Hopes, Wishes and Dreams (1976)

Back cover

From Mighty Oaks is the first solo album by Moody Blues flautist Ray Thomas together with Nicky James, Trevor Jones, Dave Potts, John Jones and Mike Moran. It was originally released in July 1975 and reissued on Compact Disc in August 1989. Despite the reissue, the album remains quite rare, particularly on CD.

The opening and title track, like the opening to the classical-rock fusion Moody Blues album Days of Future Passed, is a symphonic-style overture incorporating themes from various songs on the album. "Hey Mama Life" is a contemplative piece about hard-earned wisdom ("I was once told the streets were paved with gold / Now I know them for what they are"). "High Above My Head" is an up-tempo number featuring a strong brass accompaniment and Thomas's harmonica. "Adam and I" is dedicated to Thomas's baby son. The final track, "I Wish We Could Fly," with sweeping orchestral backing, encapsulates Thomas's trademark unassuming optimism.

Thomas had to wait in line to record his solo album. First, fellow Moodies Justin Hayward and John Lodge had the use of Threshold Studios to record their Blue Jays project beginning in June 1974. When that ran well over deadline into December, Graeme Edge was left with an uncomfortably short period to work on his "Kick Off Your Muddy Boots" album (on which Thomas appeared). To help Edge's predicament, Thomas voluntarily adjusted his schedule so that his former bandmate could finish all his recording sessions. The upshot was that Thomas had time to complete all his songs and full arrangements before his team even entered the studio. This, according to Thomas, "was a real plus. It meant that I wouldn't have to worry about using studio time to write new material and rushing things. I could concentrate instead on perfecting recordings of songs that I had already finished." As a result, "From Mighty Oaks" was wrapped up quickly and ready for release by mid-July 1975, only four months after Hayward and Lodge's album and before Edge's.

== Original track listing ==
All songs co-written by Ray Thomas and Nicky James, except where noted.

=== Side 1 ===
1. "From Mighty Oaks" – 3:43
2. "Hey Mama Life" – 5:38
3. "Play It Again" – 4:25
4. "Rock-A-Bye Baby Blues" (James) – 3:31
5. "High Above My Head" – 3:34

=== Side 2 ===
1. "Love Is the Key" – 5:16
2. "You Make Me Feel Alright" – 5:02
3. "Adam and I" – 5:42
4. "I Wish We Could Fly" (Thomas) – 5:28

This album was remastered and released on June 6, 2011 on Esoteric Recordings.

== Personnel ==
Musicians

- Ray Thomas – flute, bass flute, harmonica, lead vocals, backing vocals
- Richard Hewson – orchestral arranger, conductor
- B. J. Cole – pedal steel guitar
- Nicky James – backing vocals, percussion
- John Jones – acoustic guitar, electric guitar, backing vocals
- Trevor Jones – bass guitar, backing vocals
- Mike Moran – keyboards
- Dave Potts – drums, percussion
- Mike Silver – acoustic guitar, backing vocals

Production and recording etc.

- Ray Thomas – producer
- Derek Varnals – producer, recording engineer
- Dave Baker – 2nd engineer
- Phil Travers – illustration and design
- Graham Hughes – photography
- Mike Pulland – photography
- Mike Keys – road crew
- Mike North – road crew

== Charts ==
Chart (1975)	Peak position
UK Albums (OCC)	23
US Billboard 200	68
