= Tails of Illusion =

Studio album by Fox
- Released: 1975
- Genre: Progressive rock
- Label: GTO
- Producer: Kenny Young

Fox chronology
Fox (1975)	Tails of Illusion (1975)	Blue Hotel (1977)

Tails of Illusion is the second album by pop rock band Fox released in 1975.

== Recording and production ==
Kenny Young and company were overwhelmed after the whirlwind success of their eponymous debut album, and spent a significant while recovering in Bali. The experience revitalized him, and he wanted to do more than write silly love songs; he wanted to share his enlightenment and his Bali with the world, and it's evident throughout the album, from the cover art, to snippets of gamelan concerts, to song names ("Kupu-kupu" means butterfly). Website Allmusic gives the album 4 stars and says, 'Strange Ships is worth the price of admission alone. But other songs are just as enjoyable for the vibe they create: the America-like "For Whatever It's Worth", the jazz-pop of "Yuli, Yuli", "Kupu, Kupu" and "Minor Therapy", the slick Californian folk of "Survival", and the spot-on country rock of "Me Without You".'

== Track listing ==
All songs by Kenny Young unless noted.

1. "Yuli, Yuli" - 3:39
2. "Survival" - 4:17 (Herbie Armstrong, Young)
3. "Strange Ships" - 5:01
4. "For Whatever It's Worth" - 2:52
5. "Little Brown Box" - 4:16 (Armstrong, Young)
6. "Minor Therapy" - 5:00
7. "Lily Sing" - 3:14 (Jim Frank, Mary Zinovieff)
8. "Kupu, Kupu" - 5:50
9. "Howdja" - 3:28
10. "Me Without You" - 4:20

== Personnel ==
- Noosha Fox - vocals
- Kenny Young - acoustic guitar, guitar, vocals, producer
- Herbie Armstrong - acoustic guitar, guitar, vocals
- Jim Gannon - acoustic guitar, guitar, vocals
- Peter Solley - violin, keyboards, Farfisa
- Kimberly Frank - harmonica, drums, percussion, vocals
- Gary Lyons - engineer
- Gary Langan - assistant engineer
- Gary Bell - photography
- Roger Taylor - vocals, on "Survival" credited for singing higher than anybody else
