= Only You Can =

1975 song by Fox

Single by Fox

from the album Fox
- B-side: "Out Of My Body"
- Released: 1975
- Genre: Pop
- Label: GTO Records
- Songwriter(s): Kenny Young
- Producer(s): Kenny Young

Fox singles chronology
"Only You Can" (1975)	"Imagine Me, Imagine You" (1975)

Performance video
- "Only You Can" at TopPop on YouTube

"Only You Can" is a 1975 song by pop group Fox. Written by the group's founder Kenny Young, it was the band's debut single and later appeared on their debut album Fox. Initially released as "Only You" in the summer of 1974, a reissue of the single with the track retitled "Only You Can" became a No. 3 hit on the UK Singles chart in March 1975, ultimately spending 11 weeks on the chart.

The song was critically acclaimed and established Fox's musical trademark, the coy and unusual voice of lead singer Noosha, described by Dave Thompson of AllMusic as an "exotically accented purr". Writing for Louder Than War in 2017, Ian Canty described the song as "oddball and addictive" while AllMusic's Thompson has described "Only You Can" and its follow-up "Imagine Me, Imagine You" as "two of the most spellbinding UK hits of 1974-1975".

== Track listing ==
=== 7" Single ===
No.	Title	Length
1.	"Only You Can"	3:05
2.	"Out Of My Body"	3:00
