= Kenny Young =

American songwriter (1941–2020)

- Birth name: Shalom Giskan
- Born: April 14, 1941; Jerusalem, Mandatory Palestine
- Origin: New York City, U.S.
- Died: April 14, 2020 (aged 79); Banbury, Oxfordshire, England
- Genres: Pop, rock, world
- Occupation(s): Songwriter, musician, record producer, environmentalist
- Years active: 1963–2020

Kenny Young (born Shalom Giskan, April 14, 1941 – April 14, 2020) was an American songwriter, musician, producer and environmental campaigner who wrote and in some cases produced hit songs for The Drifters, Ronnie Dove, Herman's Hermits, Mark Lindsay, Reparata and the Delrons, Clodagh Rodgers, Quincy Jones, and Fox, among others. His most successful and famous songs as a writer include the Grammy Hall of Fame song "Under the Boardwalk" (co-written with Artie Resnick), and the Grammy Award winning song, "Ai No Corrida" (co-written with Chaz Jankel). From the late 1960s, he lived in the UK.

== Early life ==
Young was born in Jerusalem in April 1941. After moving to the US with his parents as a child, he grew up on the Lower East Side of Manhattan and attended Rabbi Jacob Joseph School, Seward Park High School and the City University of New York (CUNY), where he majored in sociology and psychology.

== Career ==
Aged 22, and after changing his name to Kenny Young, he started working as a songwriter for Bobby Darin's TM Music at the Brill Building. His first success as a writer was "Please Don't Kiss Me Again", an R&B chart hit for the Charmettes in 1963. He began writing with Artie Resnick, and the pair wrote "Under the Boardwalk", recorded by The Drifters in 1964 and later by The Rolling Stones, The Beach Boys, John Mellencamp, Billy Joe Royal, Bruce Willis, Tom Tom Club, Lynn Anderson and many other artists. His other songs written with Resnick included Ronnie Dove's chart hits "One Kiss for Old Times' Sake" and "A Little Bit of Heaven", both in 1965. Young also wrote Ronnie Dove's "When Liking Turns to Loving", as well as chart hits for Herman's Hermits ("Just a Little Bit Better" and "Don't Go Out Into the Rain") and The Seekers ("When Will the Good Apples Fall"). He also recorded as a singer in the 1960s, releasing several singles under his own name, and as The Squirrels, San Francisco Earthquakes, and more.

In 1967, he wrote "My Aim is to Please You, Girl", a hit for the Australian band The Executives. In 1968, he wrote "Captain of Your Ship", recorded by Reparata and the Delrons. Although not a hit in the US, it became successful in Britain, and Young traveled to London with the band when they appeared on Top of the Pops. Following the show, he met John Lennon and Ringo Starr, and decided to stay in London. In 1969, he had several UK hits as a writer and record producer for singer Clodagh Rodgers, including "Come Back and Shake Me" and "Goodnight Midnight", and produced singles by The Searchers. He also wrote hits in the US for Mark Lindsay, including "Arizona" and "Silver Bird".

Young also recorded as a singer-songwriter and released two solo albums in a similar style to James Taylor, Clever Dogs Chase The Sun (1971) and Last Stage For Silver World (1973), but with limited success. In Britain, Young formed two bands, Fox and Yellow Dog with whom he played, wrote and produced their top ten hits. In 1974 he formed Fox, a band featuring Noosha Fox. The band broke up in 1977. Fox had three top 20 hits in the UK and other European countries, including "Only You Can", "Imagine Me, Imagine You" and "S-S-S-Single Bed". Yellow Dog's biggest hit was "Just One More Night". Young's other bands were Gentlemen Without Weapons (with co-producers Vic Coppersmith-Heaven and Nick Glennie-Smith), 39 Vybes, and Rhythms del Mundo whose albums have gone platinum and gold in many countries.

== Environmentalism ==
In the 1980s Young co-founded the rainforest conservation organization, Earth Love Fund, with colleagues Vic Coppersmith-Heaven and Nick Glennie-Smith. He recorded the song "Spirit of the Forest" which was supported by musicians including Chris Rea, Donna Summer, Joni Mitchell, Ringo Starr, Debbie Harry, Gilberto Gil, and members of Pink Floyd and Fleetwood Mac. In 1990 he co-founded and organised the charity Earth Love Fund, which released two albums, Earthrise 1 and 2, to fund environmental initiatives around the world, with particular emphasis on rainforest projects. He received the United Nations Global 500 Award for outstanding practical achievements in the protection and improvement of the environment for his work as co-founder and trustee of the Earth Love Fund, which supported and initiated over 200 community based projects in Brazil, Africa, Asia and Australia.

He wrote and co-produced and performed an album Transmissions by Gentlemen Without Weapons on A&M Records. The band used only digital samples of nature for the music. The album was supported by a video produced by Storm Thorgerson, who also designed the album cover.

In 2006 he founded Artists' Project Earth (APE), which raises awareness and funds for climate change projects and for natural disaster relief. For APE, he produced five compilation albums, again featuring leading musicians, to raise funds for environmental projects covering such areas as climate justice, fracking and shale oil pollution, wildlife protection, agroforestry, seed saving projects, wetlands restoration, reef conservation and marine plastic pollution. Young also co-produced the Hollywood Genesis Award-winning film Spirit of the Forest, a BBC TV documentary about the destruction of the Amazon rainforest.

He produced the series of albums Rhythms del Mundo with musicians from Buena Vista Social Club and featured Coldplay, Radiohead, U2, Arctic Monkeys, Sting, Franz Ferdinand, Kaiser Chiefs, Dido, Ibrahim Ferrer, Omara Portuondo and other top international artists. This was followed up by the second album Rhythms del Mundo Classics featuring collaborations between top Cuban musicians with The Killers, Amy Winehouse, The Rolling Stones, Jack Johnson and many others; followed up by Rhythms Del Mundo – Revival featuring: Bob Dylan, Green Day, Coldplay and Dizzee Rascal. The most recent production was Rhythms Del Mundo – Africa featuring Coldplay, Beyonce, Eminem, Red Hot Chili Peppers, Mumford & Sons and Rokia Traore. The proceeds from the album benefit the environmental non-profit organization Artists Project Earth, which raises awareness and funds for climate change projects and for natural disaster relief efforts.

== Death ==
Young died on his 79th birthday in 2020, in Banbury, England, after suffering from cancer for several years.

== Discography ==
=== Albums ===
- Clever Dogs Chase The Sun (1971)
- Last Stage For Silver World (1973)

=== Chart singles written by Young ===
Year	Song	Original charting artist	Co-writer(s) with Young	^{U.S. Pop}	^{UK Singles Chart}	Other charting versions, and notes
1963	"Please Don't Kiss Me Again"	The Charmettes		100	-	
1964	"Under the Boardwalk"	The Drifters	Artie Resnick	4	45	1978: Billy Joe Royal, No. 82 US; 1982: Tom Tom Club, No. 22 UK; 1987: Bruce Willis, No. 59 US, No. 2 UK
1964	"I've Got Sand in My Shoes"	The Drifters	Artie Resnick	33	-	
1965	"One Kiss for Old Times' Sake"	Ronnie Dove	Artie Resnick	14	-	
1965	"The Record (Baby I Love You)"	Ben E. King	Artie Resnick	84	-	
1965	"A Little Bit of Heaven"	Ronnie Dove	Artie Resnick	16	-	
1965	"Just a Little Bit Better"	Herman's Hermits		7	15	
1966	"When Liking Turns to Loving"	Ronnie Dove		18	-	
1967	"Don't Go Out into the Rain (You're Going to Melt)"	Herman's Hermits		18	-	
1967	"When Will the Good Apples Fall"	The Seekers		-	11	
1968	"Captain of Your Ship"	Reparata and the Delrons	Ben Yardley	-	13	1990: "Doin' the Do", Betty Boo (Young credited as co-writer)
1969	"Come Back and Shake Me"	Clodagh Rodgers		-	3	
1969	"Goodnight Midnight"	Clodagh Rodgers		-	4	
1969	"Biljo"	Clodagh Rodgers		-	22	
1969	"Highway Song"	Nancy Sinatra		-	21	
1969	"Arizona"	Mark Lindsay		10	-	
1970	"Everybody Go Home the Party's Over "	Clodagh Rodgers		-	47	
1970	"Silver Bird"	Mark Lindsay		25	-	
1975	"Only You Can"	Fox		53	3	
1975	"Imagine Me, Imagine You"	Fox		-	15	
1976	"S-S-S-Single Bed"	Fox		-	4	
1977	"Georgina Bailey"	Noosha Fox	Herbie Armstrong	-	31	
1978	"Just One More Night"	Yellow Dog		-	8	
1978	"Wait Until Midnight"	Yellow Dog	Herbie Armstrong	-	54	
1981	"Ai No Corrida"	Quincy Jones	Chaz Jankel	28	14	2005: Uniting Nations feat. Laura More, No. 18 UK
