= Bill Sprouse Jr. =

American singer

William Daniel "Bill" Sprouse Jr. (aka Willy Sprouse Jr., 12 December 1948 – 5 September 1975) was a Christian evangelist, singer and songwriter, and the musical force behind two groups (both called The Road Home) in the early 1970s. Bill recorded several songs for Maranatha! Music and traveled extensively sharing the Gospel through his music. He was severely overweight and died at age 26. Sprouse is best known for his songwriting, including "Shotgun Angel", "Since I Met Jesus" and "Psalm Five".

"Since I Met Jesus" first appeared on the compilation Maranatha 4, along with songs by such labelmates as Love Song and The Way. The track was later released on Best of Maranatha Vol. 1, Maranatha Country Roundup, Calvary Classics Vol. 1, Maranatha Collection Vol. 2, and Long Play Country Gospel. It was played on the influential country station KFAT in Gilroy, CA. "Long Play Country Gospel" also contains five other tracks written by Sprouse but performed by other artists, and is currently available on iTunes—the only Sprouse vocal performance currently in print.

Prior to joining Maranatha, Sprouse led a secular incarnation of The Road Home which played extensively in Orange County, California. They released an album on ABC/Dunhill Records titled Peaceful Children [DS 50104] in 1971. He is credited as "Willy Sprouse Jr." on percussion, vocals, and keyboard. Their song "Love's Gonna Get You Anyway" was supposedly sampled on the title track of DJ Krush's 1996 album Meiso, featuring Black Thought and Malik B. of The Roots.
