= Noosha Fox =

Australian singer

- Born: Susan Traynor; 8 December 1944 (age 81); Australia
- Genres: Pop
- Occupation: Singer
- Years active: Late 1960s–current

Noosha Fox (born Susan Traynor, 8 December 1944) is an Australian singer. She is known as the lead singer of the British-based pop band Fox, who had three UK chart hits in 1975 and 1976. She also had a number 31 hit as a solo performer with "Georgina Bailey".

== Career ==
Susan Traynor was born in Australia in 1944. She began her music career as a singer in Sydney-based folk rock band Wooden Horse, who moved to England in 1970 and released two LPs. After the band split up, she provided background vocals on American singer and songwriter Kenny Young's 1973 solo album, Last Stage For Silverworld.

She then formed Fox, the band that included Young and Northern Irish singer-songwriter Herbie Armstrong. She adopted the stage name Noosha, a corruption of an anagram of her first name (nussa), and in performances wore dresses and accessories in 1920s and 1930s style. With Fox, Noosha achieved three top 20 hits on the UK Singles Chart: "Only You Can" and "Imagine Me, Imagine You" in 1975 and "S-S-S-Single Bed" in 1976. She left after their third album, Blue Hotel, to launch a solo career. Her first single, "Georgina Bailey", written and produced by Young, briefly entered the Top 40 in the UK Singles Chart, reaching number 31 in 1977.

In 1979, Noosha Fox tried to restart her solo career with a single, "The Heat Is On", written by Florrie Palmer and Tony Ashton, on Chrysalis Records. A later version of the song, by ABBA's Agnetha Fältskog, was a European hit four years later. In 1980, Fox provided guest vocals for the songs "Perfect Strangers" and "Havana Moon" on Tim Renwick's self-titled debut album.

Fox recorded several singles in the early 1980s for the Earlobe label but none were successful, and she withdrew from the music industry. Although she did not write her own songs, her performance style has been credited with influencing Kate Bush and Alison Goldfrapp. It was reported in 2007 on BBC Radio 4's The Music Group that Fox was recording a solo album of electropop but it was not released.

On 1 August 2022, renowned music producer Shel Talmy released a 5-track downloadable EP of original songs by Noosha which had been recorded in 1978.

== Personal life ==
Fox has been married since 1973 to physician and academic Michael Goldacre, with whom she has four children, one of whom is Ben Goldacre, a physician and academic best known for his "Bad Science" weekly column. Ben Goldacre announced that Fox was his mother after seeing her perform "S-S-S-Single Bed" on a BBC4 repeat of Top of the Pops, and stated that she was working on new material.

== Discography ==
Year	Title	Format	Label	Catalogue ref	Chart position
1977	"Georgina Bailey" / "Pretty Boy"	7" single	GTO	GT 106	No. 91 AUS, No. 31 UK
1979	"The Heat Is On" / "Some Enchanted Evening"	7" single	CHRYSALIS	CHS 2337	
1979	"Skin Tight" / "Miss You"	7" single	CHRYSALIS	CHS 2383	
1981	"More Than Molecules" / "Odd Peculiar Strange"	7" single	EARLOBE	ELB S 101	
1981	"Hot As Sun" / "The Cheapest Night"	7" single	EARLOBE	ELB S 105	
