= Paul Anka discography =

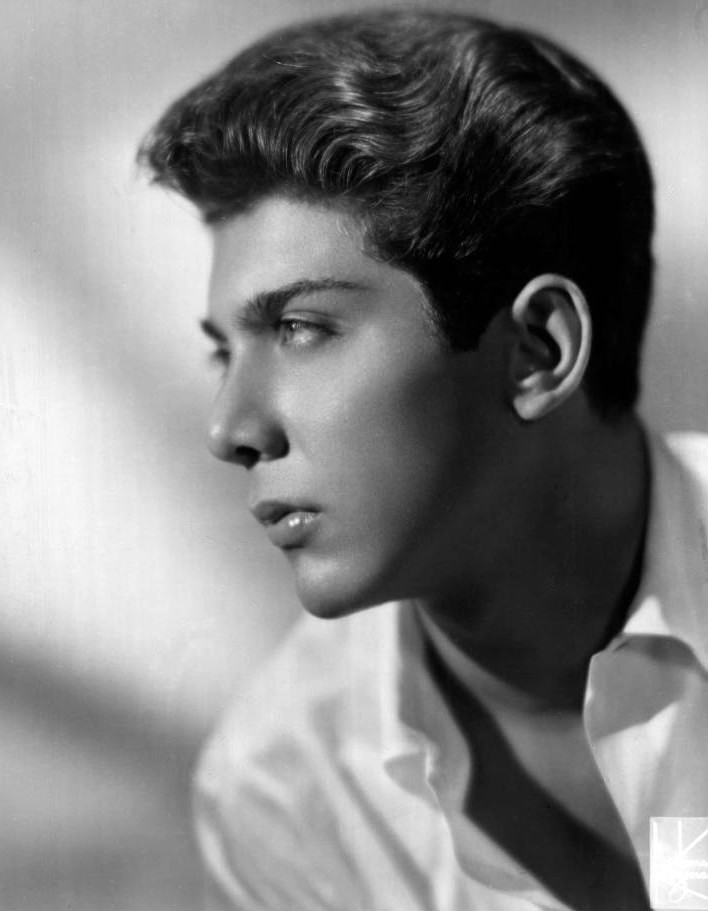
Paul Anka in 1961

This is the discography of Canadian singer-songwriter Paul Anka.

== Albums ==
=== Studio albums ===
Year	Title	Label and catalogue no.	Format	Peak chart positions				Certifications	Notes
Year	Title	Label and catalogue no.	Format	US	CAN	AUS	UK	Certifications	Notes
1958	Paul Anka	ABC Paramount (ABC-240)	LP	—	—	—	—		
1959	My Heart Sings	ABC Paramount (ABC/ABCS-296)	LP, CD	—	—	—	—		
1960	Swings For Young Lovers	ABC Paramount (ABC/ABCS-347)	LP, CD	—	—	—	—		
1960	It's Christmas Everywhere	ABC Paramount (ABC/ABCS-360)	LP	—	—	—	—		
1961	Strictly Instrumental	ABC Paramount (ABC/ABCS-371)	LP	—	—	—	—		Instrumental versions of some of Anka's hits; conducted by Sid Feller
1962	Young, Alive and In Love!	RCA Victor (LPM/LSP-2502)	LP	61	—	—	—		
1962	Let's Sit This One Out	RCA Victor (LPM/LSP-2575)	LP	137	—	—	—		
1963	Our Man Around the World	RCA Victor (LPM/LSP-2614)	LP	—	—	—	—		
1963	3 Great Guys	RCA Victor (LPM/LSP-2720)	LP	—	—	—	—		Album of new recordings by Anka, Sam Cooke, and Neil Sedaka
1963	15 Songs I Wish I’d Written	RCA Victor (LPM/LSP-2744)	LP	—	—	—	—		
1964	Italiano	RCA Italiana (LPM-10130)	LP	—	—	—	—		Album of Italian-language recordings
1964	A casa nostra	RCA Italiana (LPM-10150)	LP	—	—	—	—		Album of Italian-language recordings
1966	Strictly Nashville	RCA Victor (LPM/LSP-3580)	LP	—	—	—	—		
1969	Goodnight My Love	RCA Victor (LSP-4142)	LP	101	—	—	—		
1969	Life Goes On	RCA Victor (LSP-4250)	LP	194	—	—	—		
1970	’70s	RCA Victor (LSP-4304)	LP	—	—	—	—		
1971	Paul Anka	Buddah (BDS 5093)	LP, CD	188	46	—	—		
1971	Jubilation	Buddah (BDS 5114)	LP, CD	192	—	—	—		
1974	Anka	United Artists (UA-LA314-G)	LP, CD	9	4	38	—	RIAA: Gold	
1975	Feelings	United Artists (UA-LA367-G)	LP, CD	36	20	—	—		
1975	Times of Your Life	United Artists (UA-LA569-G)	LP	22	—	—	—	RIAA: Gold	Nine of ten cuts from previous two albums
1976	The Painter	United Artists (UA-LA653-G)	LP, CD	85	16	—	—		
1977	The Music Man	United Artists (UA-LA746-H)	LP	195	47	—	—		
1978	Listen to Your Heart	RCA (AFL1-2892)	LP, CD	179	—	—	—		
1979	Headlines	RCA (AFL1-3382)	LP, CD	—	69	—	—		
1981	Both Sides of Love	RCA (AQL1-3926)	LP	171	—	—	—		
1983	Walk a Fine Line	Columbia (FC 38442)	LP, CD	156	—	—	—		
1987	Freedom For The World (titled Freedom in Canada)	A&M Records	LP, CD	—	—	—	—		
1989	Somebody Loves You	Polydor	CD	—	—	—	—		
1996	Amigos (Duets in Spanish)	Sony	CD	—	—	—	—		
1998	A Body Of Work	Sony	CD	—	—	—	—		
2005	Rock Swings	Verve	CD	120	—	—	9	BPI: Silver	
2007	Classic Songs, My Way	Decca	CD	139	—	—	13	BPI: Silver	
2011	Songs of December	Decca	CD	—	—	—	—		
2013	Duets	Sony	CD	95	—	—	—		
2021	Making Memories	Green Hill	CD	—	—	—	—		
2022	Sessions	Green Hill	CD	—	—	—	—		
2026	Inspirations of Life and Love	Green Hill	CD	—	—	—	—		
"—" denotes releases that did not chart or were not released in that territory.

=== Compilation albums ===
Year	Title	Label	Format	Peak chart positions	
Year	Title	Label	Format	US	AUS
1959	Paul Anka Sings His Big 15	ABC Paramount	CD, LP	4	—
1961	Paul Anka Sings His Big 15, Vol. 2	ABC Paramount	LP	72	—
1962	Paul Anka Sings His Big 15, Vol. 3	ABC Paramount	LP	—	—
1962	Diana	ABC Paramount	CD, LP	—	—
1963	Paul Anka's 21 Golden Hits (newly recorded)	RCA Victor	CD, LP	65	—
1969	Diana: Paul Anka Sings His Greatest Hits	RCA Victor	LP	—	—
1974	Paul Anka Gold (28 song compilation)	Sire	LP	—	—
1974	The Essential Paul Anka (20 song compilation)	Buddah	LP	—	—
1978	Paul Anka's Golden Hits	Hammard	LP	—	57
1987	Jubilation (15 song compilation)	Garland	CD	—	—
1989	30th Anniversary Collection	Rhino	CD	—	—
1991	Five Decades Greatest Hits	Curb	CD	—	—
1992	Classic Hits	Curb	CD	—	—
1992	My Greatest Songs	RCA	CD	—	—
1993	In the 70s	RCA	CD	—	—
1996	A Golden Hour of Paul Anka	LaserLight	CD	—	—
1996	Best of the United Artist Years 1973-1977	EMI	CD	—	—
1999	Essential RCA Rock and Roll Recordings (1962–1968)	Taragon	CD	—	—
2000	Vegas Style	Taragon	CD	—	—
2003	Absolutely the Best of Paul Anka: The 70s	EMI	CD	—	—
2011	25 Grandes Exitos	Bear Family	CD	—	—
2013	Dianacally Yours	Bear Family	CD	—	—
"—" denotes releases that did not chart or were not released in that territory.

=== Live albums ===
Year	Title	Label	Format	US
1960	Anka at the Copa	ABC Paramount	LP	23

== Singles ==
Year	Single (A-side, B-side) Both sides from same album except where indicated	Chart positions									Certifications	Album
Year	Single (A-side, B-side) Both sides from same album except where indicated	US CB	US	US AC	US R&B	UK	Canada CHUM RPM	GER	ITA	AUS	Certifications	Album
1956	"I Confess" b/w "Blau-Wile-Deveest-Fontaine"	—	—	—	—	—	—	—	—	—		Non-album tracks
1957	"Diana" b/w "Don't Gamble with Love" (from Paul Anka Sings His Big 15)	2	1	—	1	1	1	2	—	1		Paul Anka (ABC-Paramount album)
1957	"I Love You, Baby" /	48	97	—	—	3	20	—	—	19		Paul Anka Sings His Big 15
1957	"Tell Me That You Love Me"	—	—	—	—	25	10	—	—	—		Big 15, Volume 2
1958	"You Are My Destiny" b/w "When I Stop Loving You (That'll Be the Day)" (from Big 15, Volume 2)	9	7	—	14	6	2; 39	—	—	13		Paul Anka Sings His Big 15
1958	"Crazy Love" /	36	15	—	—	26	—	—	—	—		Paul Anka Sings His Big 15
1958	"Let the Bells Keep Ringing"	24	16	—	—	—	4	—	—	19		Big 15, Volume 2
1958	"Midnight" b/w "Verboten! (Forbidden)" (non-album track)	—	69	—	—	26	17	—	—	32		Paul Anka Sings His Big 15
1958	"Just Young" b/w "So It's Goodbye" (from My Heart Sings)	28	80	—	—	—	—	—	15	41		Big 15 Volume 2
1958	"The Teen Commandments" (with George Hamilton IV and Johnny Nash) b/w "If You Learn to Pray" (by Don Costa's Orchestra and Chorus)	46	29	—	—	—	14	—	—	41		Non-album tracks
1958	"(All of a Sudden) My Heart Sings" b/w "That's Love" (from Paul Anka Sings His Big 15)	12	15	—	—	10	14	7	9	8		My Heart Sings
1959	"I Miss You So" b/w "Late Last Night" (from Big 15, Volume 2)	29	33	—	—	—	20	—	15	91		My Heart Sings
1959	"Lonely Boy" (from Big 15, Volume 2)	1	1	—	6	3	2	8	2	3		
1959	"Your Love"	83	—	—	—	—	—	—	—	—		Paul Anka Sings His Big 15
1959	"Put Your Head on My Shoulder"	2	2	—	12	7	4	25	2	22	BPI: Silver; RMNZ: Platinum	Paul Anka Sings His Big 15
1959	"Don't Ever Leave Me"	—	—	—	—	—	—	—	—	—		Paul Anka Sings His Big 15
1959	"It's Time to Cry" b/w "Something Has Changed Me" (from Big 15, Volume 2)	6	4	—	13	28	5	—	2	18		Paul Anka Sings His Big 15
1960	"Puppy Love" /	2	2	—	—	33	4	—	3	25		Paul Anka Sings His Big 15
1960	"Adam and Eve"	—	90	—	—	—	4	—	21	—		
1960	"My Home Town" /	8	8	—	—	—	10	—	6	20		Big 15, Volume 2
1960	"Something Happened"	51	41	—	—	—	—	—	—	—		Big 15, Volume 2
1960	"Hello, Young Lovers" /	24	23	—	—	44	5	—	13	33		Paul Anka Swings for Young Lovers
1960	"I Love You in the Same Old Way"	86	40	—	—	—	—	—	—	—		Big 15, Volume 2
1960	"Summer's Gone" b/w "I'd Have to Share"	23	11	—	29	—	22	—	—	63		Big 15, Volume 2
1960	"Rudolph the Red Nosed Reindeer" b/w "I Saw Mommy Kissing Santa Claus"	54	104	—	—	—	—	—	—	—		It's Christmas Everywhere
1960	"It's Christmas Everywhere" b/w "Rudolph the Red Nosed Reindeer"	—	—	—	—	—	—	—	—	—		It's Christmas Everywhere
1961	"The Story of My Love" /	23	16	—	—	—	32	—	26	69		Big 15, Volume 2
1961	"Don't Say You're Sorry"	—	108	—	—	—	—	—	—	—		Non-album tracks
1961	"(You Can) Share Your Love" b/w "I Talk to You (On the Telephone)" (promo single only)	—	—	—	—	—	—	—	—	—		Non-album tracks
1961	"Tonight My Love, Tonight" b/w "I'm Just a Fool Anyway" (non-album track)	11	13	—	—	—	20	—	8	29		Big 15, Volume 2
1961	"Dance on Little Girl" b/w "I Talk to You (On the Telephone)" (non-album track)	12	10	—	—	—	22	—	12	20		Big 15, Volume 2
1961	"Kissin' on the Phone" /	32	35	—	—	—	17	—	—	27		Big 15, Volume 3
1961	"Cinderella"	73	70	—	—	—	17	—	12	—		Big 15, Volume 3
1961	"The Bells at My Wedding" /	98	104	—	—	—	16	—	26	—		Big 15, Volume 3
1961	"Loveland"	101	110	—	—	—	—	—	—	78		Big 15, Volume 3
1962	"All of Me" b/w "I'm Coming Home"	—	—	—	—	—	—	—	—	—		Big 15, Volume 3
1962	"The Fools Hall of Fame" b/w "Far from the Lights of Town"	107	103	—	—	—	—	—	—	—		Big 15, Volume 3
1962	"I'd Never Find Another You" b/w "Uh Huh"	—	106	—	—	—	—	—	—	—		Big 15, Volume 3
1962	"I'm Coming Home" b/w "Cry"	—	94	—	—	—	—	—	—	—		Big 15, Volume 3
1962	"Love Me Warm and Tender" b/w "I'd Like to Know" (non-album track)	12	12	—	—	19	14	45	—	30		Remember Diana
1962	"A Steel Guitar and a Glass of Wine" b/w "I Never Knew Your Name" (non-album track)	22	13	—	—	41	17	35	—	32		Remember Diana
1962	"A Steel Guitar and a Glass of Wine" b/w "I Never Knew Your Name" (non-album track)	104	—	—	—	—	—	—	—	—		
1962	"Every Night (Without You)" b/w "There You Go"	52	46	—	—	—	—	—	—	50		Non-album tracks
1962	"Eso Beso (That Kiss)" b/w "Give Me Back My Heart" (non-album track)	24	19	—	—	—	11	14	23	18		Remember Diana
1963	"Love (Makes the World Go Round)" b/w "Crying in the Wild" (non-album track)	30	26	—	—	—	—	—	—	47		Remember Diana
1963	"Remember Diana" b/w "At Night" (non-album track)	35	39	—	—	—	—	42	—	79		Remember Diana
1963	"Hello Jim" b/w "You've Got the Nerve to Call This Love"	90	97	—	—	—	—	46	—	—		Non-album tracks
1963	"Hurry Up and Tell Me" b/w "Wondrous Are the Ways of Love"	97	—	—	—	—	—	—	—	—		Non-album tracks
1963	"Did You Have a Happy Birthday?" b/w "For No Good Reason at All"	110	89	—	—	—	—	—	—	—		Non-album tracks
1964	"From Rocking Horse to Rocking Chair" b/w "Cheer Up"	—	—	—	—	—	—	—	—	—		Non-album tracks
1964	"My Baby's Comin' Home" b/w "No, No" (from 3 Great Guys)	—	113	—	—	—	—	—	—	—		Non-album tracks
1964	"In My Imagination" b/w "It's Easy to Say"	—	—	—	—	—	—	—	—	—		Non-album tracks
1964	"Ogni Volta (Every Time)" b/w "Cindy Go Home" (non-album track)	—	—	—	—	—	—	—	—	—		A Casa Nostra
1965	"Sylvia" b/w "Behind My Smile"	—	—	—	—	—	—	—	—	—		Non-album tracks
1965	"The Loneliest Boy in the World" b/w "Dream Me Happy"	113	—	—	—	—	—	—	—	—		Non-album tracks
1965	"Every Day a Heart Is Broken" b/w "As If There Were No Tomorrow"	—	—	—	—	—	—	—	—	—		Non-album tracks
1966	"Truly Yours" b/w "Oh Such a Stranger"	—	—	—	—	—	—	—	—	—		Strictly Nashville
1966	"I Wish" b/w "I Went to Your Wedding"	—	—	—	—	—	—	—	—	—		Strictly Nashville
1966	"I Can't Help Loving You" b/w "Can't Get Along Very Well Without Her"	—	—	—	—	—	—	—	—	—		Non-album tracks
1966	"Poor Old World" b/w "I'd Rather Be a Stranger"	—	—	—	—	—	58	—	—	—		Non-album tracks
1967	"Until It's Time for You to Go" b/w "Would You Still Be My Baby"	—	—	—	—	—	—	—	—	—		Non-album tracks
1967	"A Woman Is a Sentimental Thing" b/w "That's How Love Goes"	—	—	—	—	—	—	—	—	—		Non-album tracks
1968	"Can't Get You Out of My Mind" b/w "When We Get There" (non-album track)	—	—	—	—	—	—	—	—	—		Life Goes On
1969	"Goodnight, My Love" b/w "This Crazy World" (non-album track)	26	27	2	—	—	23	—	—	—		Goodnight My Love
1969	"In the Still of the Night" b/w "Picking Up the Pieces"	64	64	36	—	—	62	—	—	—		Goodnight My Love
1969	"Sincerely" b/w "Next Year" (from Goodnight My Love)	78	80	30	—	—	75	—	—	—		Non-album track
1969	"Happy" b/w "Can't Get You Out of My Mind"	80	86	13	—	—	77	—	—	89		Life Goes On
1970	"Midnight Mistress" b/w "Medley: Before It's Too Late / (Remember); This Land Is Your Land"	—	—	—	—	—	—	—	—	—		70's
1971	"Why Are You Leaning on Me Sir" b/w "You're Some Kind of Friend"	—	—	—	—	—	—	—	—	—		Non-album tracks
1971	"Do I Love You" b/w "So Long City" (non-album track)	38	53	14	—	—	16	—	—	—		Paul Anka (Buddah album)
1972	"Jubilation" b/w "Everything's Been Changed" (from Paul Anka (Buddah) album)	58	65	—	—	—	27	—	—	—		Jubilation
1972	"Life Song" b/w "Something Good Is Coming"	—	—	—	—	—	—	—	—	—		Jubilation
1973	"While We're Still Young" b/w "This Is Your Song"	—	—	—	—	—	61	—	—	—		Non-album tracks
1973	"Hey Girl" b/w "You and Me Today" (from Jubilation)	—	—	—	—	—	63	—	—	—		Non-album tracks
1973	"Flashback"	—	100	—	—	—	—	—	—	—		Non-album tracks
1974	"Let Me Get to Know You" b/w "Flashback" (non-album track)	54	80	40	—	—	13	—	—	—		Anka
1974	"(You're) Having My Baby" (with Odia Coates) b/w "Papa"	1	1	5	—	6	1	15	—	2		Anka
1974	"One Man Woman/One Woman Man" (with Odia Coates) b/w "Let Me Get to Know You"	7	7	5	—	—	4	—	—	35		Anka
1975	"I Don't Like to Sleep Alone" (with Odia Coates) b/w "How Can Anything Be Beautiful-After You" (from Anka)	5	8	8	—	—	1	—	—	74		Feelings
1975	"(I Believe) There's Nothing Stronger Than Our Love" (with Odia Coates) b/w "Today I Became a Fool"	14	15	3	—	—	1	—	—	83		Feelings
1975	"Times of Your Life" b/w "Water Runs Deep" (from Feelings)	17	7	1	—	—	31	—	—	—		Times of Your Life
1976	"Anytime (I'll Be There)" b/w "Something About You" (from Anka)	50	33	2	—	—	56	—	—	—		Feelings
1976	"Make It Up to Me in Love" (with Odia Coates) b/w "You" (by Odia Coates)	101	—	20	—	—	34	—	—	—		Non-album tracks
1976	"Happier" b/w "Closing Doors"	97	60	10	—	—	46	—	—	—		The Painter
1977	"My Best Friend's Wife" b/w "Never Gonna Fall in Love Again (Like I Fell in Love with You)" (from The Painter)	74	80	41	—	—	63	—	—	—		The Music Man
1977	"Everybody Ought to Be in Love" b/w "Tonight"	83	75	—	—	—	55	—	—	—		The Music Man
1978	"Brought Up in New York (Brought Down in L.A.)" b/w "Love Me Lady"	—	—	—	—	—	—	—	—	—		Listen to Your Heart
1978	"This Is Love" b/w "I'm By Myself Again"	70	35	3	—	—	66	—	—	—		Listen to Your Heart
1979	"As Long As We Keep Believing" b/w "Headlines"	—	—	29	—	—	80	—	—	—		Headlines
1981	"Think I'm in Love Again" b/w "We Love Each Other"	—	—	—	—	—	—	—	—	—		Both Sides of Love
1981	"I've Been Waiting for You All of My Life" b/w "Think I'm in Love Again"	63	48	16	—	—	—	—	—	—		Both Sides of Love
1981	"Lady Lay Down" b/w "You're Still a Part of Me"	—	—	—	—	—	—	—	—	—		Both Sides of Love
1983	"Hold Me 'Til the Mornin' Comes" b/w "This Is the First Time"	38	40	2	—	—	1 (AC)	—	—	49		Walk a Fine Line
1984	"Second Chance" b/w "Walk a Fine Line"	—	—	14	—	—	—	—	—	—		Walk a Fine Line
1996	"Diana" (with Ricky Martin)	—	—	—	—	—	—	—	—	—		Amigos
"—" denotes releases that did not chart or were not released in that territory.

== See also ==
- Canadian rock
- Music of Canada
