= List of Billboard Hot 100 top-ten singles in 1975 =

This is a list of singles that have peaked in the Top 10 of the Billboard Hot 100 during 1975.

Elton John scored four top ten hits during the year with "Lucy in the Sky with Diamonds", "Philadelphia Freedom", "Someone Saved My Life Tonight", and "Island Girl", the most among all other artists.

== Top-ten singles ==
- (#) – 1975 Year-end top 10 single position and rank

List of Billboard Hot 100 top ten singles which peaked in 1975
Top ten entry date	Single	Artist(s)	Peak	Peak date	Weeks in top ten
Singles from 1974
December 7	"You're the First, the Last, My Everything"	Barry White	2	January 4	7
December 14	"Lucy in the Sky with Diamonds"	Elton John	1	January 4	6
December 14	"Junior's Farm" / "Sally G"	Paul McCartney and Wings	3	January 11	6
December 28	"Laughter in the Rain" (#9)	Neil Sedaka	1	February 1	7
December 28	"Boogie On Reggae Woman"	Stevie Wonder	3	February 1	8
December 28	"Only You"	Ringo Starr	6	January 11	3
Singles from 1975
January 4	"Mandy"	Barry Manilow	1	January 18	5
January 4	"Please Mr. Postman"	The Carpenters	1	January 25	5
January 11	"One Man Woman/One Woman Man"	Paul Anka and Odia Coates	7	January 25	3
January 18	"Morning Side of the Mountain"	Donny and Marie Osmond	8	January 25	3
January 18	"Never Can Say Goodbye"	Gloria Gaynor	9	January 25	2
January 25	"Fire"	Ohio Players	1	February 8	4
January 25	"You're No Good"	Linda Ronstadt	1	February 15	5
January 25	"Pick Up the Pieces"	Average White Band	1	February 22	7
February 1	"Best of My Love"	Eagles	1	March 1	6
February 1	"Some Kind of Wonderful" (#6)	Grand Funk Railroad	3	February 22	5
February 8	"Black Water"	The Doobie Brothers	1	March 15	7
February 8	"Lonely People"	America	5	March 8	6
February 8	"Get Dancin'"	Disco-Tex and the Sex-O-Lettes	10	February 8	1
February 15	"My Eyes Adored You" (#5)	Frankie Valli	1	March 22	8
February 15	"#9 Dream"	John Lennon	9	February 22	2
February 22	"Have You Never Been Mellow"	Olivia Newton-John	1	March 8	7
February 22	"Nightingale"	Carole King	9	March 1	2
March 1	"Lady Marmalade"	Labelle	1	March 29	7
March 1	"Lady"	Styx	6	March 8	3
March 8	"Lovin' You"	Minnie Riperton	1	April 5	8
March 8	"Can't Get It Out of My Head"	Electric Light Orchestra	9	March 15	2
March 15	"Express"	B. T. Express	4	March 29	5
March 15	"Don't Call Us, We'll Call You"	Sugarloaf	9	March 29	3
March 22	"No No Song" / "Snookeroo"	Ringo Starr	3	April 5	5
March 22	"You Are So Beautiful"	Joe Cocker	5	March 29	3
March 22	"Poetry Man"	Phoebe Snow	5	April 12	4
March 29	"Philadelphia Freedom" (#3)	The Elton John Band	1	April 12	9
April 5	"(Hey Won't You Play) Another Somebody Done Somebody Wrong Song"	B. J. Thomas	1	April 26	7
April 12	"Chevy Van"	Sammy Johns	5	May 3	4
April 12	"What Am I Gonna Do with You"	Barry White	8	April 19	3
April 12	"Once You Get Started"	Rufus featuring Chaka Khan	10	April 12	1
April 19	"He Don't Love You (Like I Love You)"	Tony Orlando and Dawn	1	May 3	6
April 19	"Before the Next Teardrop Falls" (#4)	Freddy Fender	1	May 31	8
April 19	"Supernatural Thing (Part 1)"	Ben E. King	5	April 26	2
April 19	"Emma"	Hot Chocolate	8	April 26	2
April 26	"Walking in Rhythm"	The Blackbyrds	6	May 10	4
May 3	"Shining Star" (#7)	Earth, Wind & Fire	1	May 24	5
May 3	"Jackie Blue"	The Ozark Mountain Daredevils	3	May 17	4
May 3	"Only Yesterday"	The Carpenters	4	May 24	5
May 3	"Long Tall Glasses (I Can Dance)"	Leo Sayer	9	May 3	2
May 10	"I Don't Like to Sleep Alone"	Paul Anka and Odia Coates	8	May 24	4
May 17	"Thank God I'm a Country Boy"	John Denver	1	June 7	5
May 17	"How Long"	Ace	3	May 31	4
May 24	"Bad Time"	Grand Funk Railroad	4	June 7	4
May 24	"Old Days"	Chicago	5	June 7	4
May 31	"Sister Golden Hair"	America	1	June 14	4
May 31	"When Will I Be Loved"	Linda Ronstadt	2	June 21	7
June 7	"I'm Not Lisa"	Jessi Colter	4	June 21	5
June 7	"Love Won't Let Me Wait"	Major Harris	5	June 21	5
June 14	"Love Will Keep Us Together" (#1)	Captain & Tennille	1	June 21	6
June 14	"Get Down, Get Down (Get on the Floor)"	Joe Simon	8	June 21	3
June 21	"Listen to What the Man Said"	Paul McCartney and Wings	1	July 19	7
June 21	"The Hustle"	Van McCoy & the Soul City Symphony	1	July 26	7
June 21	"Wildfire"	Michael Martin Murphey	3	June 21	4
June 21	"Cut the Cake"	Average White Band	10	June 21	2
June 28	"Magic"	Pilot	5	July 12	4
July 5	"One of These Nights" (#10)	Eagles	1	August 2	10
July 5	"Please Mr. Please"	Olivia Newton-John	3	August 9	8
July 12	"I'm Not in Love"	10cc	2	July 26	5
July 12	"Swearin' to God"	Frankie Valli	6	July 26	3
July 19	"Jive Talkin'"	Bee Gees	1	August 9	8
July 19	"Rockin' Chair"	Gwen McCrae	9	August 2	3
July 26	"Someone Saved My Life Tonight"	Elton John	4	August 16	6
July 26	"Midnight Blue"	Melissa Manchester	6	August 9	4
August 2	"Dynomite"	Bazuka	10	August 2	1
August 9	"Rhinestone Cowboy" (#2)	Glen Campbell	1	September 6	9
August 9	"How Sweet It Is (To Be Loved by You)"	James Taylor	5	August 30	5
August 9	"Why Can't We Be Friends?"	War	6	August 23	4
August 9	"The Rockford Files Theme"	Mike Post	10	August 9	2
August 16	"Fallin' in Love"	Hamilton, Joe Frank & Reynolds	1	August 23	6
August 23	"Get Down Tonight"	KC and the Sunshine Band	1	August 30	4
August 23	"At Seventeen"	Janis Ian	3	September 13	6
August 30	"Fight the Power (Part 1)"	The Isley Brothers	4	September 27	5
September 6	"Fame" (#8)	David Bowie	1	September 20	6
September 6	"Could It Be Magic"	Barry Manilow	6	September 20	4
September 13	"I'm Sorry" / "Calypso"	John Denver	1	September 27	9
September 13	"Run Joey Run"	David Geddes	4	October 4	4
September 13	"Wasted Days and Wasted Nights"	Freddy Fender	8	September 27	3
September 20	"Feel Like Makin' Love"	Bad Company	10	September 20	2
September 27	"The Ballroom Blitz"	Sweet	5	October 18	5
October 4	"Bad Blood"	Neil Sedaka	1	October 11	5
October 4	"Mr. Jaws"	Dickie Goodman	4	October 11	2
October 4	"Dance with Me"	Orleans	6	October 18	3
October 4	"Ain't No Way to Treat a Lady"	Helen Reddy	8	October 11	3
October 4	"Rocky"	Austin Roberts	9	October 11	2
October 11	"Lyin' Eyes"	Eagles	2	November 8	6
October 11	"Miracles"	Jefferson Starship	3	October 18	6
October 18	"Who Loves You"	The Four Seasons	3	November 15	7
October 18	"They Just Can't Stop It (Games People Play)"	The Spinners	5	October 25	4
October 18	"Feelings"	Morris Albert	6	October 25	6
October 25	"Island Girl"	Elton John	1	November 1	7
October 25	"It Only Takes a Minute"	Tavares	10	October 25	1
November 1	"Heat Wave"	Linda Ronstadt	5	November 15	3
November 1	"This Will Be"	Natalie Cole	6	November 22	5
November 8	"The Way I Want to Touch You"	Captain & Tennille	4	November 29	5
November 15	"That's the Way (I Like It)"	KC and the Sunshine Band	1	November 22	9
November 15	"Low Rider"	War	7	November 29	4
November 22	"Fly, Robin, Fly"	Silver Convention	1	November 29	7
November 22	"Let's Do It Again"	The Staple Singers	1	December 27	7
November 22	"Sky High"	Jigsaw	3	December 6	5
November 29	"Nights on Broadway"	Bee Gees	7	December 13	4
December 6	"My Little Town"	Simon & Garfunkel	9	December 13	2

=== 1974 peaks ===
List of Billboard Hot 100 top ten singles in 1975 which peaked in 1974
Top ten entry date	Single	Artist(s)	Peak	Peak date	Weeks in top ten
November 23	"Kung Fu Fighting"	Carl Douglas	1	December 7	8
November 30	"Angie Baby"	Helen Reddy	1	December 28	6

=== 1976 peaks ===
List of Billboard Hot 100 top ten singles in 1975 which peaked in 1976
Top ten entry date	Single	Artist(s)	Peak	Peak date	Weeks in top ten
December 6	"Saturday Night"	Bay City Rollers	1	January 3	6
December 13	"Theme from Mahogany (Do You Know Where You're Going To)"	Diana Ross	1	January 24	7
December 13	"Love Rollercoaster"	Ohio Players	1	January 31	10
December 13	"Fox on the Run"	Sweet	5	January 17	6
December 20	"I Write the Songs"	Barry Manilow	1	January 17	10
December 27	"Convoy"	C. W. McCall	1	January 10	7
December 27	"I Love Music"	The O'Jays	5	January 24	6

== See also ==
- 1975 in music
- List of Billboard Hot 100 number ones of 1975
- Billboard Year-End Hot 100 singles of 1975
