= 30th Anniversary Collection (Paul Anka album) =

Compilation album by Paul Anka
- Released: October 1989
- Genre: Pop rock
- Length: 69 minutes
- Label: Rhino

30th Anniversary Collection is a compilation album by Paul Anka, released in 1989.

== Reception ==
Professional ratings
Review scores
Source	Rating
Allmusic	4.5/5 stars

Allmusic gave the compilation 4.5 stars out of 5 and said, "Not many artists can claim a 20-year run of hits, much less be credited with writing the majority of them as well, but Paul Anka can."

== Track listing ==
All tracks are written by Paul Anka, except where noted.

No.	Title	Writer(s)	Length
1.	"Diana"		2:28
2.	"You Are My Destiny"		2:48
3.	"Crazy Love"		2:28
4.	"Let the Bells Keep Ringing"		2:00
5.	"The Teen Commandments" (Featuring George Hamilton IV, Johnny Nash)		1:44
6.	"(All of a Sudden) My Heart Sings"	Jean Marie Blanvillain / Henri Herpin / Harold Rome	3:04
7.	"Lonely Boy"		2:38
8.	"Put Your Head on My Shoulder"		2:40
9.	"It's Time to Cry"		2:27
10.	"Puppy Love"		2:42
11.	"My Home Town"		2:31
12.	"Summer's Gone"		2:44
13.	"Tonight My Love, Tonight"		2:10
14.	"Dance on Little Girl"		2:21
15.	"Love Me Warm and Tender"		2:19
16.	"Eso Beso (That Kiss!)"	Joe Sherman / Noel Sherman	2:28
17.	"Goodnight My Love (Pleasant Dreams)"	John Marascalco / George Matola	3:16
18.	"Jubilation"	Paul Anka / Johnny Harris	6:50
19.	"(You're) Having My Baby" (Featuring Odia Coates)		2:34
20.	"One Man Woman/One Woman Man" (Featuring Odia Coates)		3:04
21.	"I Don't Like to Sleep Alone" (Featuring Odia Coates)		3:18
22.	"(I Believe) There's Nothing Stronger Than Our Love" (Featuring Odia Coates)		3:01
23.	"Times of Your Life"	Bill Lane / Roger Nichols	3:16
24.	"My Way"	Paul Anka / Claude François / Jacques Revaux / Gilles Thibault	4:27
