= List of number-one singles of 1975 (Canada) =

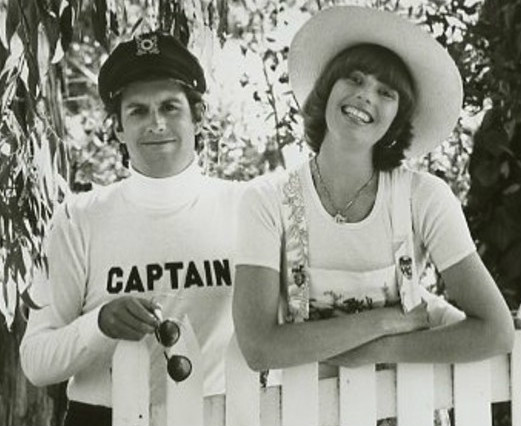
American pop duo Captain & Tennille reached number one in the Canadian charts with "Love Will Keep Us Together", which became the number-one year-end single for 1975

RPM was a Canadian music magazine that published the best-performing singles chart in Canada from 1964 to 2000. In 1975, thirty-two singles reached number one in Canada. The first number one single was "Kung Fu Fighting" by the Jamaican singer Carl Douglas which reached number one in December 1974, and the last was "That's the Way (I Like It)" by the American disco and funk band KC and the Sunshine Band. Twelve acts had their first number-one on the chart, such as Barry Manilow, the Eagles, Carol Douglas, Labelle, Captain & Tennille, Michael Murphey, Pilot, Van McCoy, 10cc, KC and the Sunshine Band, The Amazing Rhythm Aces, and Johnny Wakelin. Two Canadian acts, Paul Anka and Bachman-Turner Overdrive, had at least one number-one song each in the chart that year.

The best-performing single of the year was "Love Will Keep Us Together", originally written and performed by Neil Sedaka and recorded by the American pop duo Captain & Tennille; it spent 18 weeks in the chart, including a week at number one. Elton John had the most weeks at number one in 1975, totalling six weeks with a 4-week number-one run with a cover version of the Beatles' "Lucy in the Sky with Diamonds" and two weeks with "Philadelphia Freedom". KC and the Sunshine Band had a total of four weeks at number one with "Get Down Tonight" (one week) and "That's the Way (I Like It)" (3 weeks). Barry Manilow, Olivia Newton-John and John Denver spent a total of three weeks each at number one, and several other acts spent a total of two weeks at number one, such the Eagles, Paul Anka, Ringo Starr, Bachman–Turner Overdrive, Van McCoy and 10cc.

== Chart history ==
Key
The yellow background indicates the #1 song on RPM's year-end top 200 singles chart of 1975.

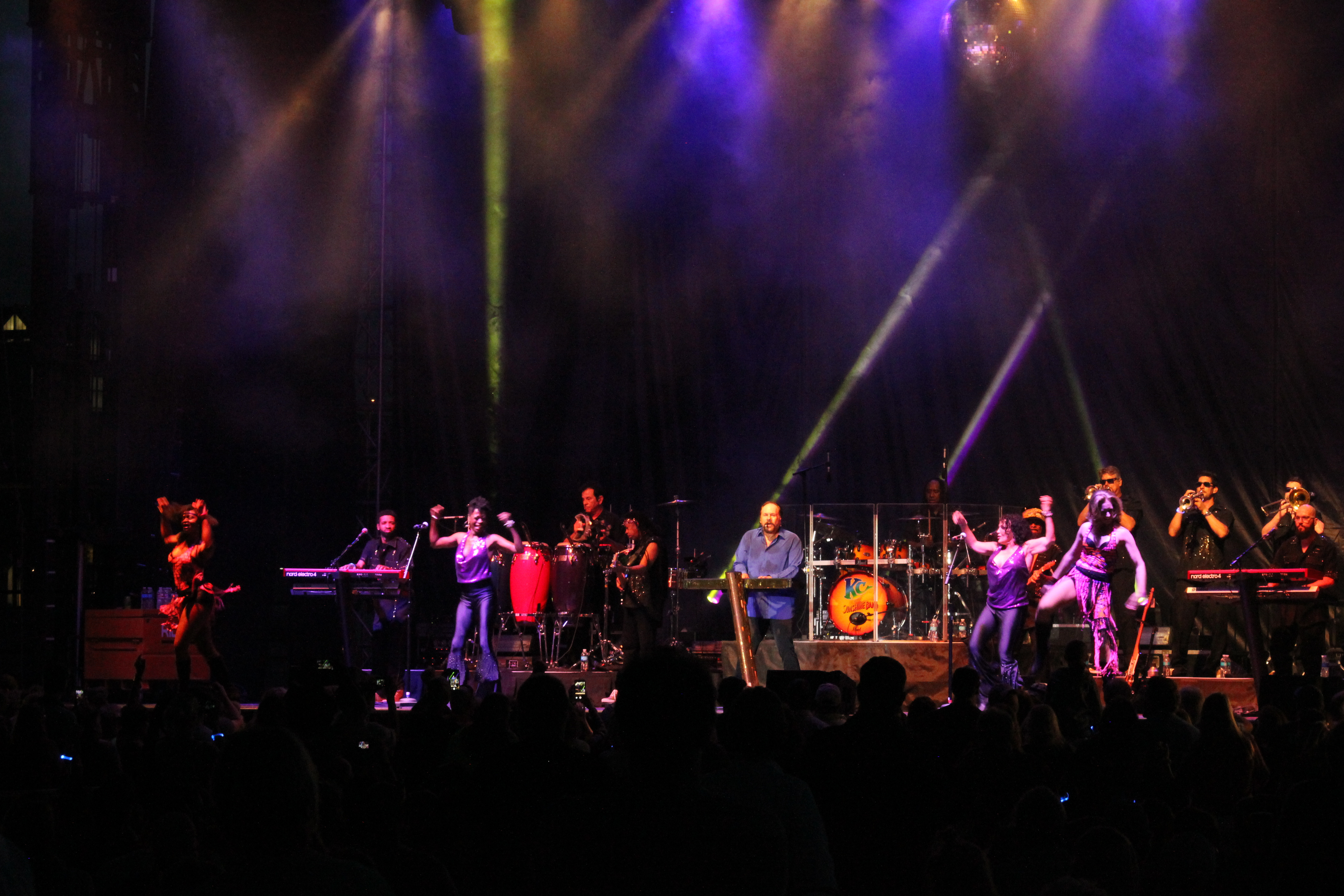
American disco and funk band KC and the Sunshine Band (pictured in 2017) totalled four weeks at number one with "Get Down Tonight" (1 week) and "That's the Way (I Like It)" (3 weeks).

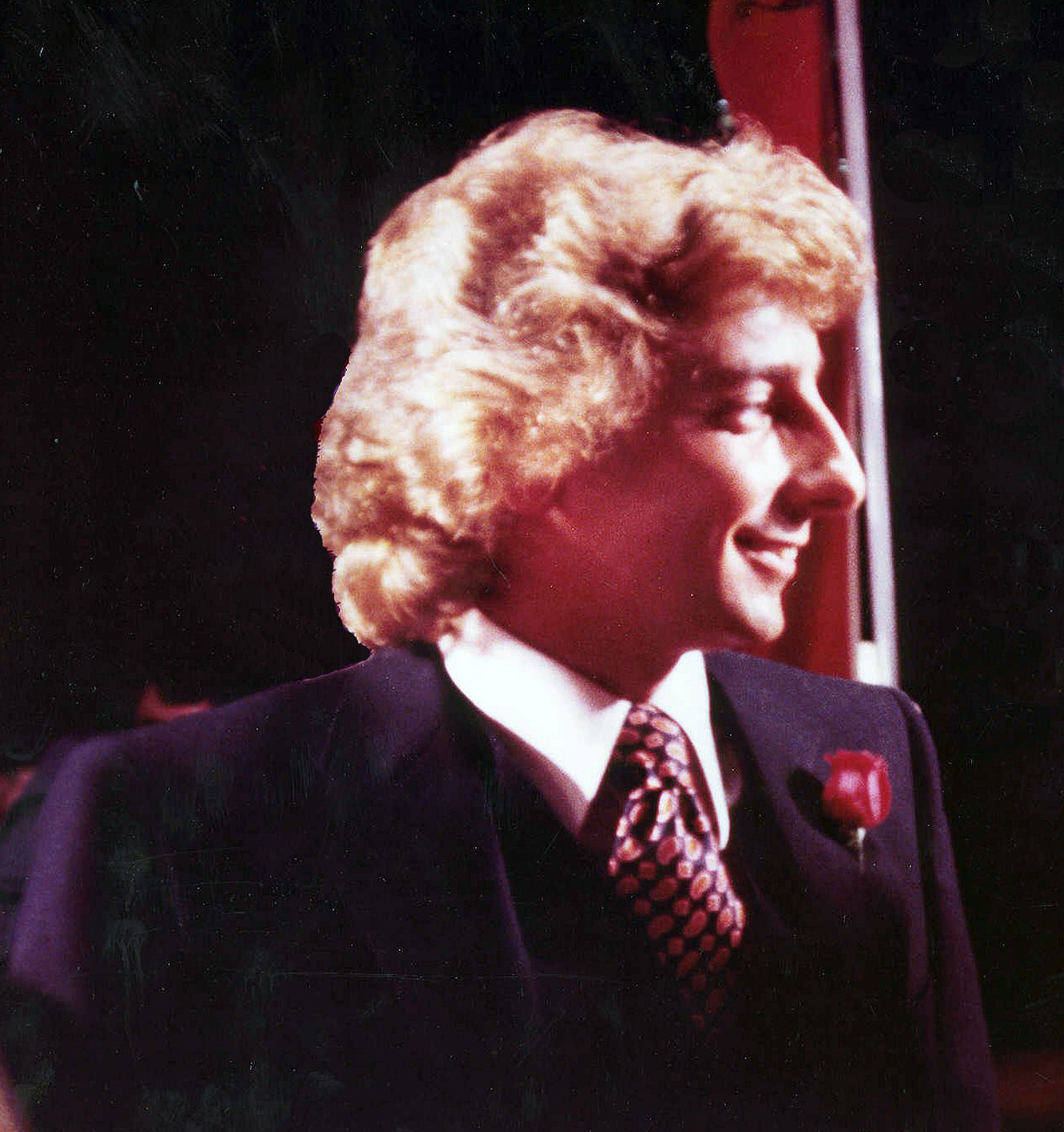
Barry Manilow totalled three weeks at number one with "Mandy" and "It's a Miracle".

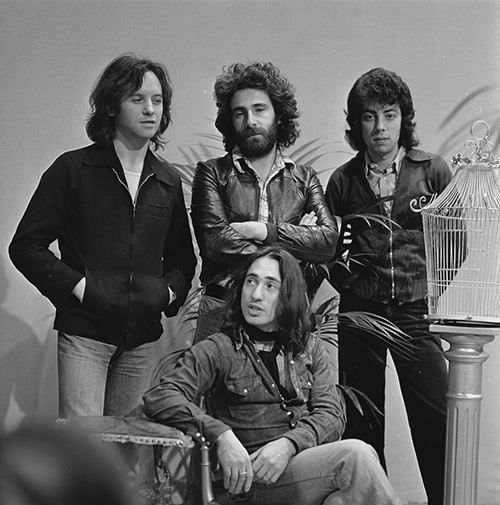
English progressive pop band 10cc topped the chart for two weeks with "I'm Not in Love".

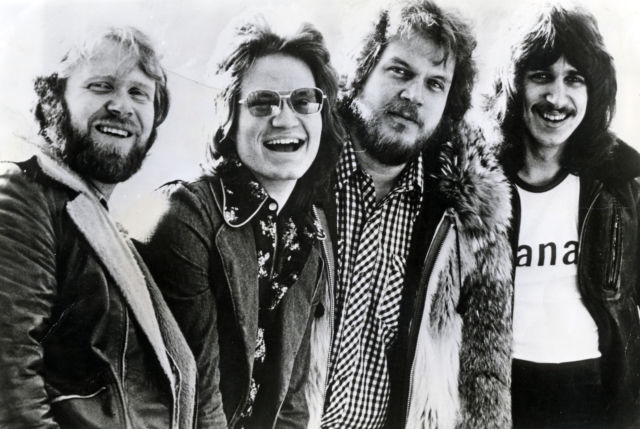
Bachman–Turner Overdrive spent two weeks at number one with "Hey You" to become the second Canadian act to reach number one in 1975.

Chart history
Issue date	Title	Artist(s)	Ref.
January 4 (Note: Due to a two-week break in publication for the 1974/1975 Christmas and New Year period, the week of January 4 is inferred.)	"Kung Fu Fighting"	Carl Douglas	
January 11	"Lucy in the Sky with Diamonds"	Elton John	
January 18	"Lucy in the Sky with Diamonds"	Elton John	
January 25	"Lucy in the Sky with Diamonds"	Elton John	
February 1	"Lucy in the Sky with Diamonds"	Elton John	
February 8	"Please Mr. Postman"	The Carpenters	
February 15	"Doctor's Orders"	Carol Douglas	
February 22	"Mandy"	Barry Manilow	
March 1	"Best of My Love"	Eagles	
March 8 (Note: No issue was published for March 8, so this week is inferred.)	"Best of My Love"	Eagles	
March 15	"Have You Never Been Mellow"	Olivia Newton-John	
March 22	"Have You Never Been Mellow"	Olivia Newton-John	
March 29	"Lady Marmalade"	Labelle	
April 5	"No No Song"	Ringo Starr	
April 12	"No No Song"	Ringo Starr	
April 19	"Philadelphia Freedom"	Elton John	
April 26	"Philadelphia Freedom"	Elton John	
May 3	"I Don't Like to Sleep Alone"	Paul Anka	
May 10	"It's a Miracle"	Barry Manilow	
May 17	"It's a Miracle"	Barry Manilow	
May 24	"Thank God I'm a Country Boy"	John Denver	
May 31	"Thank God I'm a Country Boy"	John Denver	
June 7	"Hey You"	Bachman–Turner Overdrive	
June 14	"Hey You"	Bachman–Turner Overdrive	
June 21	"Love Will Keep Us Together"	Captain & Tennille	
June 28	"Wildfire"	Michael Murphey	
July 5	"Only Women Bleed"	Alice Cooper	
July 12	"Listen to What the Man Said"	Wings	
July 19	"Magic"	Pilot	
July 26	"The Hustle"	Van McCoy	
August 2	"The Hustle"	Van McCoy	
August 9	"Please Mr. Please"	Olivia Newton-John	
August 16	"Jive Talkin'"	Bee Gees	
August 23	"I'm Not in Love"	10cc	
August 30	"I'm Not in Love"	10cc	
September 6	"How Sweet It Is (To Be Loved by You)"	James Taylor	
September 13	"I Believe (There Is Nothing Stronger Than Our Love)"	Paul Anka	
September 20	"Rhinestone Cowboy"	Glen Campbell	
September 27	"Get Down Tonight"	KC and the Sunshine Band	
October 4	"The Ballroom Blitz"	Sweet	
October 13 (Note: The issue containing this chart was intended for publication in October 11, but was delayed to October 13, so the date.)	"Third Rate Romance"	The Amazing Rhythm Aces	
October 18	"I'm Sorry"	John Denver	
October 25	"Black Superman (Muhammad Ali)"	Johnny Wakelin	
December 13 (Note: RPM's publication schedule indicates a hiatus throughout November 1975 up to December 6, when a combined issue (volumes 24, issues 10, 11 and 12) was published for the week of December 13. Since no "last week" positions are provided in the chart for that issue, the charting process was restarted.)	"That's the Way (I Like It)"	KC and the Sunshine Band	
December 20	"That's the Way (I Like It)"	KC and the Sunshine Band	
December 27	"That's the Way (I Like It)"	KC and the Sunshine Band	

== See also ==
- List of RPM number-one easy listening singles of 1975
- List of RPM number-one country singles of 1975
- List of Billboard Hot 100 number ones of 1975
- List of Cashbox Top 100 number-one singles of 1975
