= Billboard Year-End Hot 100 singles of 1975 =

Ranking of recorded music

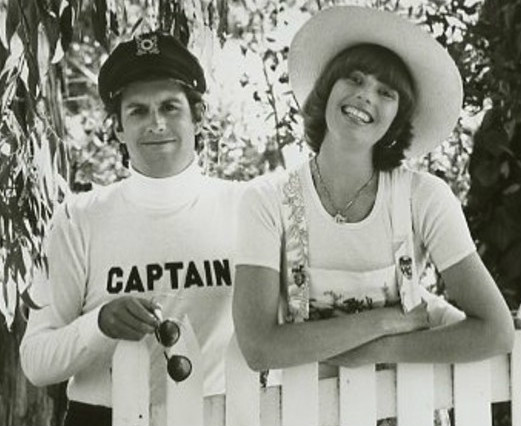
"Love Will Keep Us Together" by Captain & Tennille was the number one song of 1975.

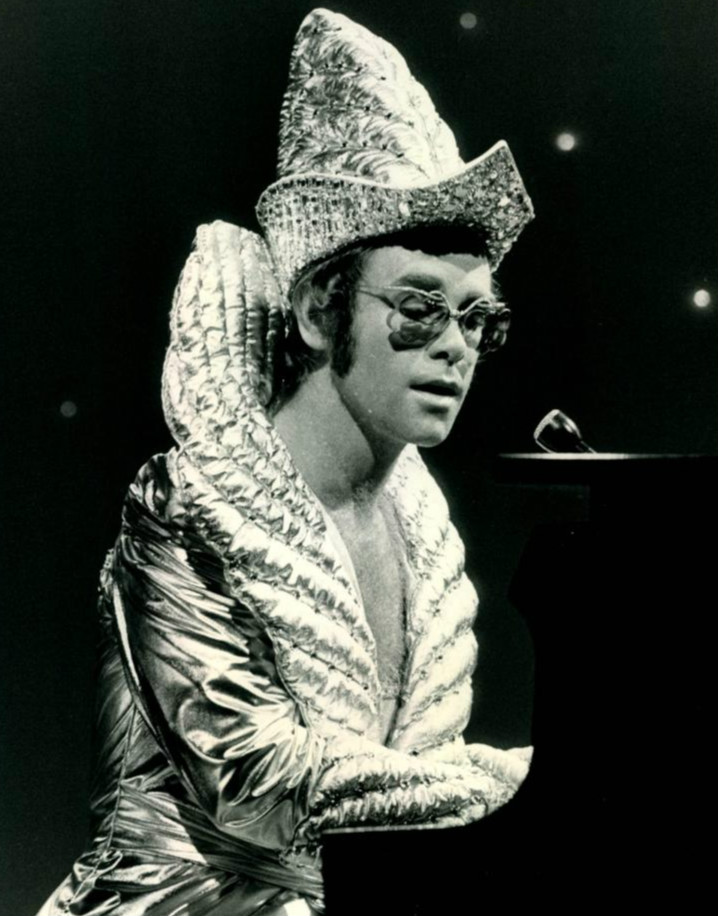
Elton John had three songs on the Year-End Hot 100, the most of any artist in 1975, including the number-three song of the year, "Philadelphia Freedom".

This is a list of Billboard magazine's Top Hot 100 songs of 1975. The Top 100, as revealed in the year-end edition of Billboard dated December 27, 1975, is based on Hot 100 charts from the issue dates of November 2, 1974 through November 1, 1975.

No.	Title	Artist(s)
1	"Love Will Keep Us Together"	Captain & Tennille
2	"Rhinestone Cowboy"	Glen Campbell
3	"Philadelphia Freedom"	Elton John
4	"Before the Next Teardrop Falls"	Freddy Fender
5	"My Eyes Adored You"	Frankie Valli
6	"Some Kind of Wonderful"	Grand Funk Railroad
7	"Shining Star"	Earth, Wind & Fire
8	"Fame"	David Bowie
9	"Laughter in the Rain"	Neil Sedaka
10	"One of These Nights"	Eagles
11	"Thank God I'm a Country Boy"	John Denver
12	"Jive Talkin'"	Bee Gees
13	"Best of My Love"	Eagles
14	"Lovin' You"	Minnie Riperton
15	"Kung Fu Fighting"	Carl Douglas
16	"Black Water"	The Doobie Brothers
17	"The Ballroom Blitz"	Sweet
18	"(Hey Won't You Play) Another Somebody Done Somebody Wrong Song"	B.J. Thomas
19	"He Don't Love You (Like I Love You)"	Tony Orlando and Dawn
20	"At Seventeen"	Janis Ian
21	"Pick Up the Pieces"	Average White Band
22	"The Hustle"	Van McCoy & the Soul City Symphony
23	"Lady Marmalade"	Labelle
24	"Why Can't We Be Friends?"	War
25	"Love Won't Let Me Wait"	Major Harris
26	"Boogie On Reggae Woman"	Stevie Wonder
27	"Wasted Days and Wasted Nights"	Freddy Fender
28	"Angie Baby"	Helen Reddy
29	"Fight the Power"	The Isley Brothers
30	"Jackie Blue"	Ozark Mountain Daredevils
31	"Fire"	Ohio Players
32	"Magic"	Pilot
33	"Please Mr. Postman"	The Carpenters
34	"Sister Golden Hair"	America
35	"Lucy in the Sky with Diamonds"	Elton John
36	"Mandy"	Barry Manilow
37	"Have You Never Been Mellow"	Olivia Newton-John
38	"Could It Be Magic"	Barry Manilow
39	"Cat's in the Cradle"	Harry Chapin
40	"Wildfire"	Michael Martin Murphey
41	"I'm Not Lisa"	Jessi Colter
42	"Listen to What the Man Said"	Wings
43	"I'm Not in Love"	10cc
44	"I Can Help"	Billy Swan
45	"Fallin' in Love"	Hamilton, Joe Frank & Reynolds
46	"Feelings"	Morris Albert
47	"When Will I Be Loved"	Linda Ronstadt
48	"Chevy Van"	Sammy Johns
49	"You're the First, the Last, My Everything"	Barry White
50	"Please Mr. Please"	Olivia Newton-John
51	"You're No Good"	Linda Ronstadt
52	"Dynomite"	Bazuka
53	"Walking in Rhythm"	The Blackbyrds
54	"The Way We Were/Try to Remember"	Gladys Knight & the Pips
55	"Midnight Blue"	Melissa Manchester
56	"Don't Call Us, We'll Call You"	Sugarloaf
57	"Poetry Man"	Phoebe Snow
58	"How Long?"	Ace
59	"Express"	B.T. Express
60	"That's the Way of the World"	Earth, Wind & Fire
61	"Lady"	Styx
62	"Bad Time"	Grand Funk
63	"Only Women Bleed"	Alice Cooper
64	"Doctor's Orders"	Carol Douglas
65	"Get Down Tonight"	KC and the Sunshine Band
66	"One Man Woman/One Woman Man"	Paul Anka & Odia Coates
67	"You Are So Beautiful"	Joe Cocker
68	"Feel Like Makin' Love"	Bad Company
69	"How Sweet It Is (To Be Loved by You)"	James Taylor
70	"Dance with Me"	Orleans
71	"Cut the Cake"	Average White Band
72	"Never Can Say Goodbye"	Gloria Gaynor
73	"I Don't Like to Sleep Alone"	Paul Anka & Odia Coates
74	"Morning Side of the Mountain"	Donny & Marie Osmond
75	"When Will I See You Again"	The Three Degrees
76	"Get Down, Get Down (Get on the Floor)"	Joe Simon
77	"I'm Sorry"	John Denver
78	"Killer Queen"	Queen
79	"Shoeshine Boy"	Eddie Kendricks
80	"Do It ('Til You're Satisfied)"	B.T. Express
81	"Can't Get It Out of My Head"	Electric Light Orchestra
82	"Sha-La-La (Make Me Happy)"	Al Green
83	"Lonely People"	America
84	"You Got the Love"	Rufus
85	"The Rockford Files Theme"	Mike Post
86	"It Only Takes a Minute"	Tavares
87	"No No Song"	Ringo Starr
88	"Junior's Farm"	Paul McCartney & Wings
89	"Bungle in the Jungle"	Jethro Tull
90	"Long Tall Glasses (I Can Dance)"	Leo Sayer
91	"Misty"	Ray Stevens
92	"Someone Saved My Life Tonight"	Elton John
93	"Bad Blood"	Neil Sedaka
94	"Only Yesterday"	The Carpenters
95	"I'm on Fire"	Dwight Twilley Band
96	"Only You (And You Alone)"	Ringo Starr
97	"Third Rate Romance"	Amazing Rhythm Aces
98	"You Ain't Seen Nothing Yet"	Bachman–Turner Overdrive
99	"Swearin' to God"	Frankie Valli
100	"Get Dancin'"	Disco-Tex and the Sex-O-Lettes

== See also ==
- 1975 in music
- Billboard Year-End Hot Soul Singles of 1975
- List of Billboard Hot 100 number ones of 1975
- List of Billboard Hot 100 top-ten singles in 1975
