= List of Cash Box Top 100 number-one singles of 1975 =

This is a list of singles that reached number one on the Cash Box Top 100 chart during 1975.

Key
The yellow background indicates the #1 song of 1975.

Issue date	Song	Artist
January 4	"Lucy in the Sky with Diamonds"	Elton John
January 11	"You're the First, the Last, My Everything"	Barry White
January 18	"Mandy"	Barry Manilow
January 25	"Please Mr. Postman"	The Carpenters
February 1	"Laughter in the Rain"	Neil Sedaka
February 8	"Boogie On Reggae Woman"	Stevie Wonder
February 15	"You're No Good"	Linda Ronstadt
February 22	"Fire"	Ohio Players
March 1	"Pick Up the Pieces"	The Average White Band
March 8	"Have You Never Been Mellow"	Olivia Newton-John
March 15	"My Eyes Adored You"	Frankie Valli
March 22	"Lady Marmalade"	LaBelle
March 29	"Lovin' You"	Minnie Riperton
April 5	"No No Song"	Ringo Starr
April 12	"Philadelphia Freedom"	Elton John Band
April 19	"Philadelphia Freedom"	Elton John Band
April 26	"(Hey Won't You Play) Another Somebody; Done Somebody Wrong Song"	B. J. Thomas
May 3	"He Don't Love You (Like I Love You)"	Tony Orlando and Dawn
May 10	"Jackie Blue"	Ozark Mountain Daredevils
May 17	"Jackie Blue"	Ozark Mountain Daredevils
May 24	"Shining Star"	Earth, Wind & Fire
May 31	"How Long"	Ace
June 7	"Before the Next Teardrop Falls"	Freddy Fender
June 14	"Thank God I'm a Country Boy"	John Denver
June 21	"When Will I Be Loved"	Linda Ronstadt
June 28	"Love Will Keep Us Together"	Captain & Tennille
July 5	"Love Will Keep Us Together"	Captain & Tennille
July 12	"Listen to What the Man Said"	Paul McCartney and Wings
July 19	"The Hustle"	Van McCoy and the Soul City Symphony
July 26	"One of These Nights"	Eagles
August 2	"Please Mr. Please"	Olivia Newton-John
August 9	"Jive Talkin'"	Bee Gees
August 16	"Someone Saved My Life Tonight"	Elton John
August 23	"Get Down Tonight"	KC and the Sunshine Band
August 30	"Get Down Tonight"	KC and the Sunshine Band
September 6	"Fallin' in Love"	Hamilton, Joe Frank & Reynolds
September 13	"Rhinestone Cowboy"	Glen Campbell
September 20	"At Seventeen"	Janis Ian
September 27	"Fame"	David Bowie
October 4	"Run Joey Run"	David Geddes
October 11	"I'm Sorry"	John Denver
October 18	"Mr. Jaws"	Dickie Goodman
October 25	"Bad Blood"	Neil Sedaka
November 1	"Bad Blood"	Neil Sedaka
November 8	"Island Girl"	Elton John
November 15	"Island Girl"	Elton John
November 22	"Fly, Robin, Fly"	Silver Convention
November 29	"That's the Way (I Like It)"	KC and the Sunshine Band
December 6	"That's the Way (I Like It)"	KC and the Sunshine Band
December 13	"That's the Way (I Like It)"	KC and the Sunshine Band
December 20	"Let's Do It Again"	The Staple Singers
December 27	"Saturday Night"	Bay City Rollers

== See also ==
- 1975 in music
- List of Hot 100 number-one singles of 1975 (U.S.)
