= List of RPM number-one easy listening singles of 1975 =

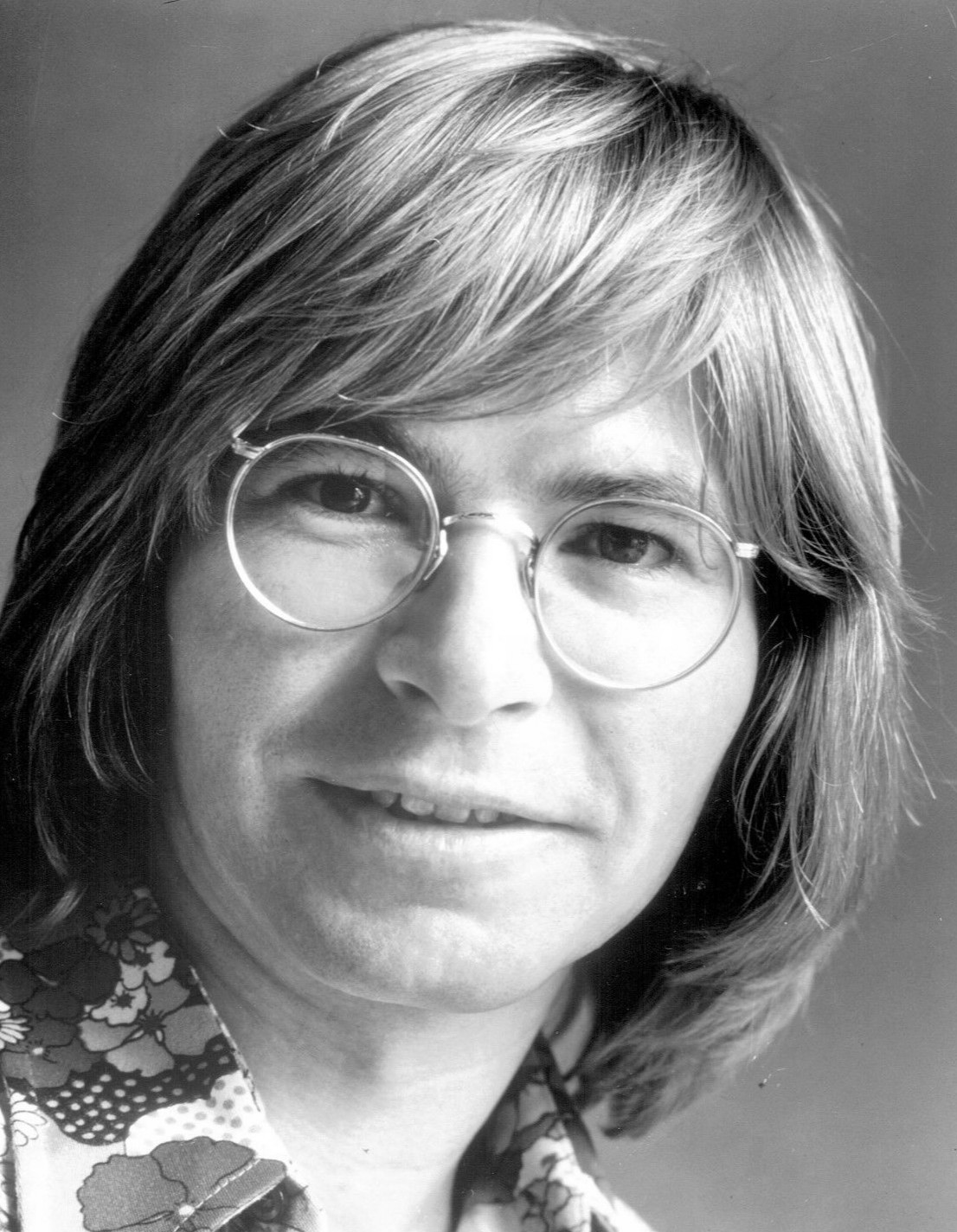
American singer-songwriter John Denver spent four non-consecutive weeks with "I'm Sorry", which became the number-one year-end Canadian easy-listening single of 1975.

In 1975, RPM magazine published a chart for top-performing singles in the easy listening/middle-of-the-road categories in Canada. The chart, entitled Pop Music Playlist, has undergone numerous name changes, becoming MOR Playlist in 1976, Adult Oriented Playlist in 1977, Contemporary Adult in 1981 and finally Adult Contemporary in 1984 until the magazine's final publication in November 2000. The first number-one in 1975 was "Cat's in the Cradle" by American singer-songwriter Harry Chapin, continuing from the 1974 charts, and the last was "Something Better to Do" by English-Australian singer Olivia Newton-John. Ten acts have their first number-one in the chart in 1975: Barry Manilow, Jessi Colter, Frankie Valli (as solo from The Four Seasons), Van McCoy, Murray McLauchlan, Janis Ian, Hamilton, Joe Frank & Reynolds, Hagood Hardy and Art Garfunkel (as solo from Simon & Garfunkel). Five Canadian acts, Paul Anka, Gordon Lightfoot, Ken Tobias, Murray McLauchlan and Hagood Hardy had at least one number-one that year.

The best-performing single of the year was "I'm Sorry" by the American singer-songwriter John Denver, which spent four non-consecutive weeks at number one on the chart. Denver also had the most weeks at number one in 1975, totalling seven, and also had two further number-ones singles earlier in the year with "Sweet Surrender" and "Thank God I'm a Country Boy". Olivia Newton-John spent a total of six weeks at number one with "Have You Never Been Mellow" (four weeks), "Please Mr. Please" and "Something Better to Do". Paul Anka (with Odia Coates) charted three number-ones in 1975, such as "One Man Woman, One Woman Man", "I Don't Like to Sleep Alone" and "I Believe (There Is Nothing Stronger that Our Love)" to become the Canadian act with the most number-ones and total weeks at number one.

== Chart history ==
Key
The yellow background indicates the #1 song on RPM's year-end top 25 middle-of-the-road singles chart of 1975.

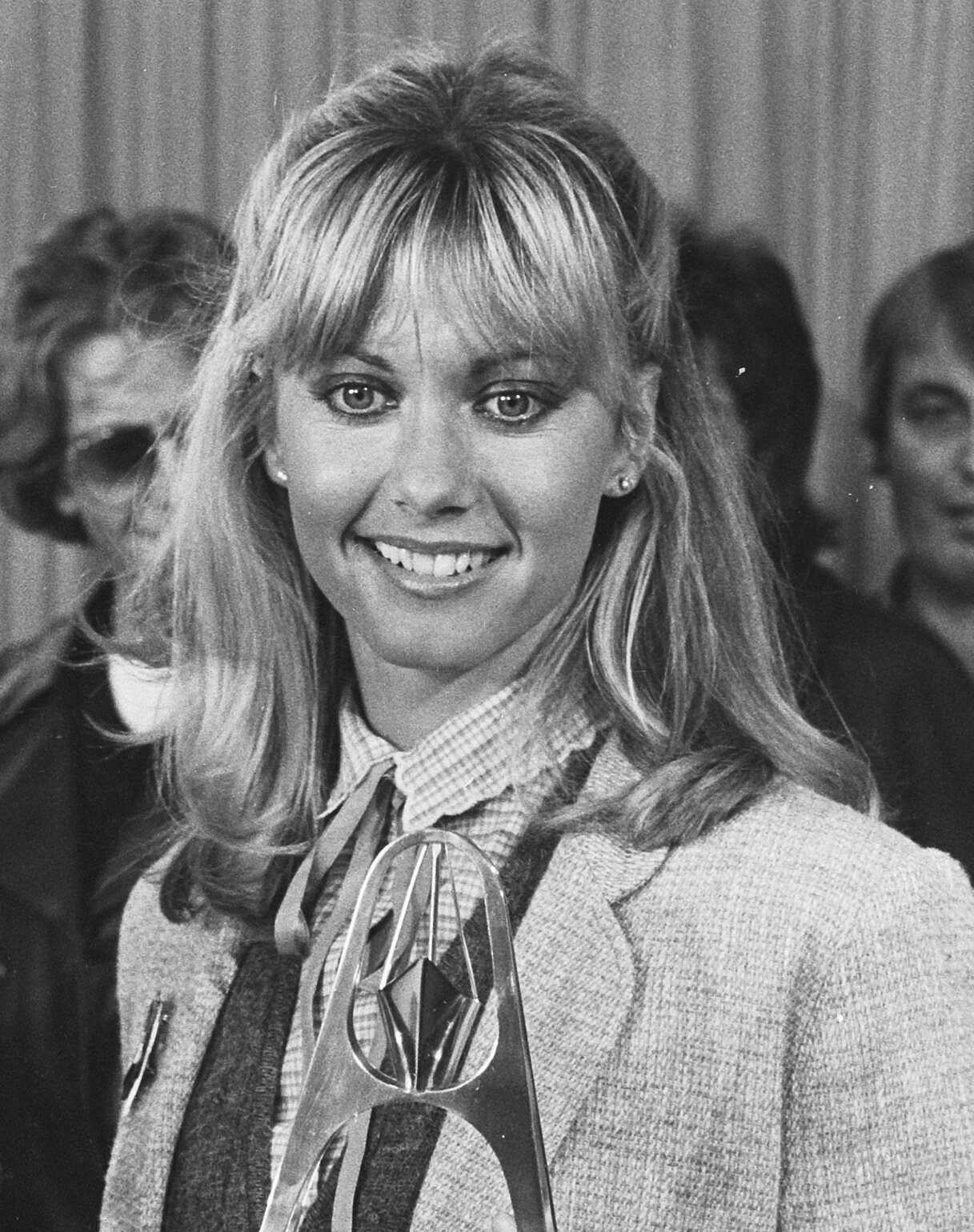
Olivia Newton-John topped the chart with "Have You Never Been Mellow", "Please Mr. Please", and "Something Better to Do", totalling six weeks at number one

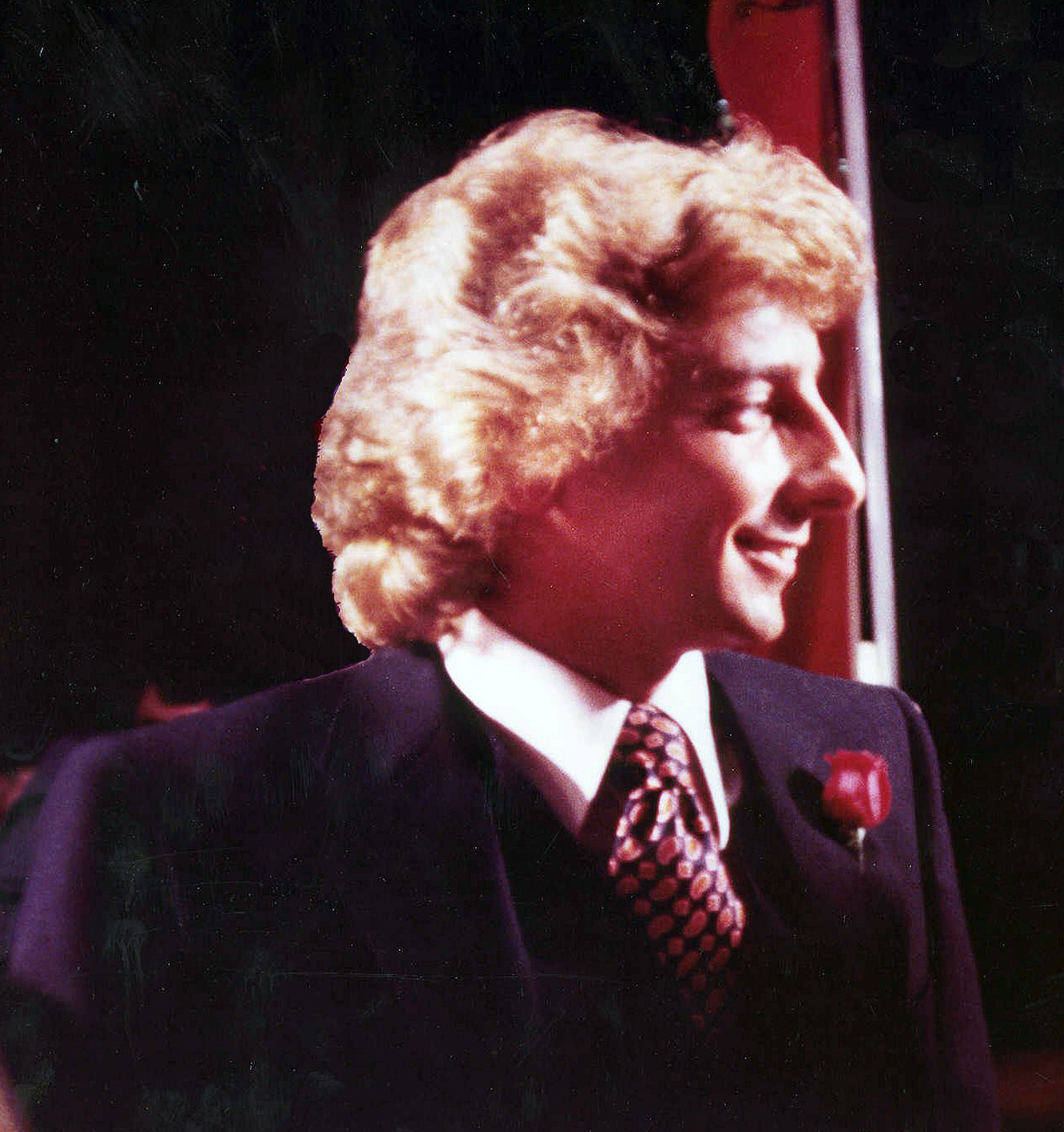
Barry Manilow achieved his first number-one single on the chart with "Mandy".

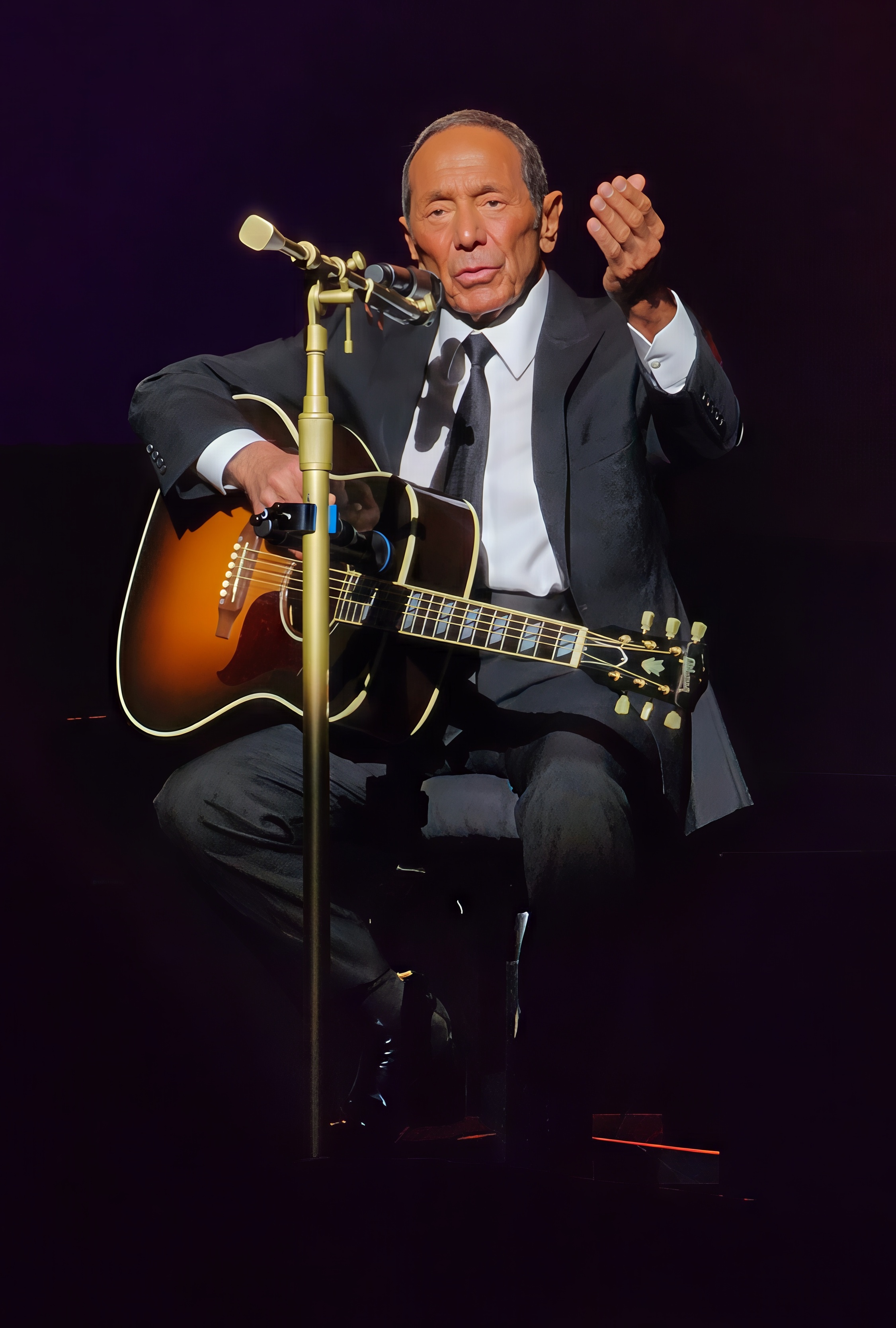
Paul Anka (pictured in 2024) had three number-one hits on the chart together with Odia Coates to become one of the Canadian artists that topped the chart in 1975

Chart history
| Issue date | Title | Artist(s) | Ref. |
|---|---|---|---|
| January 4 (Note: Due to a two-week break in publication for the 1974/1975 Christmas and New Year period, the week of January 4 is inferred.) | "Cat's in the Cradle" | Harry Chapin | |
| January 11 | "One Man Woman, One Woman Man" | Paul Anka and Odia Coates | |
| January 18 | "Only You" | Ringo Starr | |
| January 25 | "Mandy" | Barry Manilow | |
| February 1 | "Please Mr. Postman" | The Carpenters | |
| February 8 | "Morning Side of the Mountain" | Donny & Marie Osmond | |
| February 15 | "Best of My Love" | Eagles | |
| February 22 | "Sweet Surrender" | John Denver | |
| March 1 | "Have You Never Been Mellow" | Olivia Newton-John | |
| March 8 (Note: No issue was published for March 8, so this week is inferred.) | "Have You Never Been Mellow" | Olivia Newton-John | |
| March 15 | "Have You Never Been Mellow" | Olivia Newton-John | |
| March 22 | "Have You Never Been Mellow" | Olivia Newton-John | |
| March 29 | "Emotion" | Helen Reddy | |
| April 5 | "My Boy" | Elvis Presley | |
| April 12 | "(Hey Won't You Play) Another Somebody Done Somebody Wrong Song" | B. J. Thomas | |
| April 19 | "I Don't Like to Sleep Alone" | Paul Anka and Odia Coates | |
| April 26 | "I Don't Like to Sleep Alone" | Paul Anka and Odia Coates | |
| May 3 | "Lady Luck" | Ken Tobias | |
| May 10 | "Thank God I'm a Country Boy" | John Denver | |
| May 17 | "Thank God I'm a Country Boy" | John Denver | |
| May 24 | "Rainy Day People" | Gordon Lightfoot | |
| May 31 | "Anytime" | Frank Sinatra | |
| June 7 | "Wonderful Baby" | Don McLean | |
| June 14 | "Love Will Keep Us Together" | Captain & Tennille | |
| June 21 | "Wildfire" | Michael Murphey | |
| June 28 | "Midnight Blue" | Melissa Manchester | |
| July 5 | "I'm Not Lisa" | Jessi Colter | |
| July 12 | "When Will I Be Loved" | Linda Ronstadt | |
| July 19 | "Swearin' to God" | Frankie Valli | |
| July 26 | "The Hustle" | Van McCoy | |
| August 2 | "Down by the Henry Moore" | Murray McLauchlan | |
| August 9 | "Please Mr. Please" | Olivia Newton-John | |
| August 16 | "At Seventeen" | Janis Ian | |
| August 23 | "How Sweet It Is (To Be Loved by You)" | James Taylor | |
| August 30 | "At Seventeen" | Janis Ian | |
| September 6 | "Fallin' in Love" | Hamilton, Joe Frank & Reynolds | |
| September 13 | "I Believe (There Is Nothing Stronger Than Our Love)" | Paul Anka and Odia Coates | |
| September 20 | "I'm Sorry" | John Denver | |
| September 27 | "I'm Sorry" | John Denver | |
| October 4 | "I'm Sorry" | John Denver | |
| October 13 (Note: The issue containing this chart was intended for publication in October 11, but was delayed to October 13, so the date.) | "The Homecoming" | Hagood Hardy | |
| October 18 | "I Only Have Eyes for You" | Art Garfunkel | |
| October 25 | "I'm Sorry" | John Denver | |
| December 20 (Note: RPM's publication schedule indicates a chart hiatus throughout November 1975 and up to December 13, when volume 24, issue 13 was published for the week of December 20. Since no "last week" positions are provided in the chart for that issue, the charting process was restarted.) | "The Way I Want to Touch You" | Captain & Tennille | |
| December 27 | "Something Better to Do" | Olivia Newton-John | |
