= 30th Anniversary =

30th Anniversary or 30th Anniversary Collection may refer to:

== Music ==
- 30th Anniversary (Baccara album)
- 30th Anniversary Collection (Whitesnake album)
- 30th Anniversary Collection (Paul Anka album) 1989
- 30th Anniversary Anthology by The Whispers 1999
- 30th Anniversary Concert DVD by Canadian hard rock band Helix

== See also ==
- She's So Unusual: A 30th Anniversary Celebration (album) redirects to She's So Unusual
- Thyrty: The 30th Anniversary Collection 30th anniversary album by the southern rock band Lynyrd Skynyrd
- The 30th Anniversary Concert Celebration live double-album of Bob Dylan
- Howzat! – 30th Anniversary Celebration Collection compilation album by Sherbet released in 1999
- Tobaccoland 30th Anniversary Show by Tobaccoland Chorus
- 30th Anniversary Tour: Live album by George Thorogood and the Destroyers 2004
- The 30th Anniversary Concert: Live in Tokyo live video album by the Michael Schenker Group 2010
