= 30th Anniversary Collection =

30th Anniversary Collection may refer to:

- 30th Anniversary Collection (Whitesnake album)
- 30th Anniversary Collection (Paul Anka album)
