= Have You Never Been Mellow =

Studio album by Olivia Newton-John
- Released: 12 February 1975
- Recorded: 1974
- Studios: Abbey Road, London
- Genres: Country; country pop
- Length: 39:29
- Label: MCA
- Producer: John Farrar

Olivia Newton-John chronology
First Impressions (1974)	Have You Never Been Mellow (1975)	Clearly Love (1975)

Singles from Have You Never Been Mellow
- 1. "Have You Never Been Mellow" Released: 21 January 1975; 2. "Please Mr. Please" Released: June 1975

Have You Never Been Mellow is the sixth studio album by British-Australian singer Olivia Newton-John, released on 12 February 1975 by MCA Records.

Both the title single and the album rose to the top of their respective US charts (the Billboard Hot 100 singles chart and the Billboard 200 albums chart). The title song and its follow-up, "Please Mr. Please", were both top 10 on three Billboard charts: the Hot 100, Adult Contemporary, and Country. The title song was Newton-John's first charting single in Japan, where it reached number 26 on the Oricon singles chart. This album received positive reviews from music critics at the time of its release.

Newton-John received a Grammy nomination for Best Female Pop Vocal Performance for her work on the song "Have You Never Been Mellow", but lost to "At Seventeen" by Janis Ian. The album was also named Favorite Pop/Rock Album at the American Music Awards of 1976, beating The Eagles and Elton John.

The album was certified Gold in the US. The LP sold 169,380 copies in Japan.

== Reception ==
Professional ratings
Review scores
Source	Rating
AllMusic	4/5 stars
The Village Voice	D+

Rolling Stone noted that "with the huge success of Have You Never Been Mellow, Olivia Newton-John joins Helen Reddy and Karen Carpenter as one of the decade's three white female MOR superstars...Newton-John's records combine standard MOR production with instrumentation borrowed from country music, and Newton-John, who is British born, affects a country-girl personality convincingly enough to sell to the country as well as the pop market. Her voice is very pretty, especially in the upper register... She looks and sounds like a breathlessly innocent real-life doll. The smash title cut of her new album is its most ingenuous. Three other songs—"It's So Easy", "Please Mr. Please" and Rick Nelson's "Lifestream"—are possible follow-ups."

Billboard praised the album, noting that "last year's new superstar shows no signs of slowing down this mix of country, soft rock and easy listening cuts designed to appeal to the fans she has garnered in all three areas. Miss Newton-John has developed into an excellent singer, she does not go out of her range and stands as a remarkable example of musical versatility. Backed by fine production and arrangements throughout, the set is basically an extension and progression of her last effort...Few flaws here and an almost certain bet to strap her firmly in the superstar category for good."

Cashbox stated that "Olivia Newton-John's latest LP is another much expected treat. The Grammy winner is at her best here singing a collection of songs that display the charm, poise and total command she exercises everytime she sings."

AllMusic called the title track "a masterpiece of songwriting by her producer, John Farrar, an exquisitely pleasant melody with a sunny and peaceful theme." In their review of the entire album, critic Joe Viglione noted that "from beginning to end Have You Never Been Mellow is Olivia Newton-John showing why she could hold her own on the charts with as powerful a star as Elton John. Recorded at EMI Studios, London, it has impeccable sound and a special vibe."

== Track listings ==
Side one
No.	Title	Writer(s)	Length
1.	"Have You Never Been Mellow"	John Farrar	3:33
2.	"Loving Arms"	Tom Jans	2:56
3.	"Lifestream"	Ricky Nelson	2:38
4.	"Goodbye Again"	John Denver	3:59
5.	"Water Under the Bridge"	Petrina Lordan	3:05
6.	"I Never Did Sing You a Love Song"	David Nichtern	2:47

Side two
No.	Title	Writer(s)	Length
7.	"It's So Easy"	Hank Marvin, John Farrar	3:10
8.	"The Air That I Breathe"	Albert Hammond; Mike Hazlewood	3:52
9.	"Follow Me"	John Denver	3:03
10.	"And in the Morning"	Graeme Hall	4:36
11.	"Please Mr. Please"	Bruce Welch; John Rostill	3:22

Japanese bonus track
No.	Title	Writer(s)	Length
12.	"I Honestly Love You"	Peter Allen; Jeff Barry	3:22

Australian bonus track
No.	Title	Writer(s)	Length
12.	"If You Love Me (Let Me Know)"	John Rostill	3:12

== Charts ==
=== Weekly charts ===
Chart (1975)	Peak position
Australian Albums (Kent Music Report)	13
Canada Top Albums/CDs (RPM)	3
Japanese Albums (Oricon)	4
UK Albums (Official Charts)	37
US Billboard 200	1
US Top Country Albums (Billboard)	1
US Cash Box Top Albums	1
US Cash Box Country Albums	1
New Zealand Albums (RMNZ)	20

=== Year-end charts ===
Chart (1975)	Position
Canada Top Albums/CDs (RPM)	18
US Billboard 200	13
US Top Country Albums (Billboard)	4

== Certifications and sales ==
Region	Certification	Certified units/sales
Canada (Music Canada)	2× Platinum	200,000^{^}
Japan	—	169,380
United States (RIAA)	Gold	500,000^{^}
^{^} Shipments figures based on certification alone.
