= Classic Songs, My Way =

Studio album by Paul Anka
- Released: 2007
- Genre: Swing
- Label: Decca
- Producer: Alex Christensen, Don Costa, Paul Anka

Paul Anka chronology
Rock Swings (2005)	Classic Songs, My Way (2007)	Songs of December (2011)

Professional ratings
Review scores
Source	Rating
Allmusic	3.5/5 stars

Classic Songs, My Way is a 2007 album by Paul Anka. It follows the same formula of his previous album, 2005's Rock Swings.

In late 2007 the album peaked in the top 13 position for a week in the UK charts. The following weeks the album descended to the 22, 44 and 70 position.

== Track listing ==
Original writers/performers appear in parentheses

Disc 1 - My Way

1. "Time After Time" (Cyndi Lauper) - 4:03
2. "Get Here" (Oleta Adams) - 3:21
3. "Mr. Brightside" (The Killers) - 3:49
4. "Waiting for a Girl Like You" (Foreigner) - 3:14
5. "Ordinary World" (Duran Duran) - 4:32
6. "Heaven" (Bryan Adams) - 3:32
7. "Bad Day" (Daniel Powter) - 4:05
8. "I Go to Extremes" (Billy Joel) - 3:12
9. "Both Sides, Now" (Joni Mitchell) - 5:24
10. "You Are My Destiny" (with Michael Bublé) - 3:57
11. "Walking in Memphis" (Marc Cohn) - 4:23
12. "Against the Wind" (Bob Seger) - 4:40
13. "My Way" (with Jon Bon Jovi) - 5:19

Disc 2 - Classic Songs

1. "Diana" - 2:27
2. "Don't Gamble with Love" - 2:33
3. "I Love You Baby" - 2:12
4. "You Are My Destiny" - 2:48
5. "Crazy Love" - 2:26
6. "My Heart Sings" - 3:03
7. "Lonely Boy" - 2:36
8. "Put Your Head On My Shoulder" - 2:40
9. "My Home Town" - 2:31
10. "Puppy Love" - 2:43
11. "Adam & Eve" - 2:31
12. "Tonight My Love, Tonight" - 2:10
13. "Cinderella" - 2:18
14. "Dance On Little Girl" - 2:21
15. "A Steel Guitar & A Glass Of Wine" - 3:21
16. "It Doesn't Matter Anymore" - 3:51
17. "Ogni Volta" - 3:37
18. "Les Filles De Paris" - 5:02
19. "I'm Not Anyone" (with Sammy Davis Jr) - 4:07
20. "You Are My Destiny" (Instrumental Reprise) - 2:00
