= List of Billboard Hot 100 number ones of 1975 =

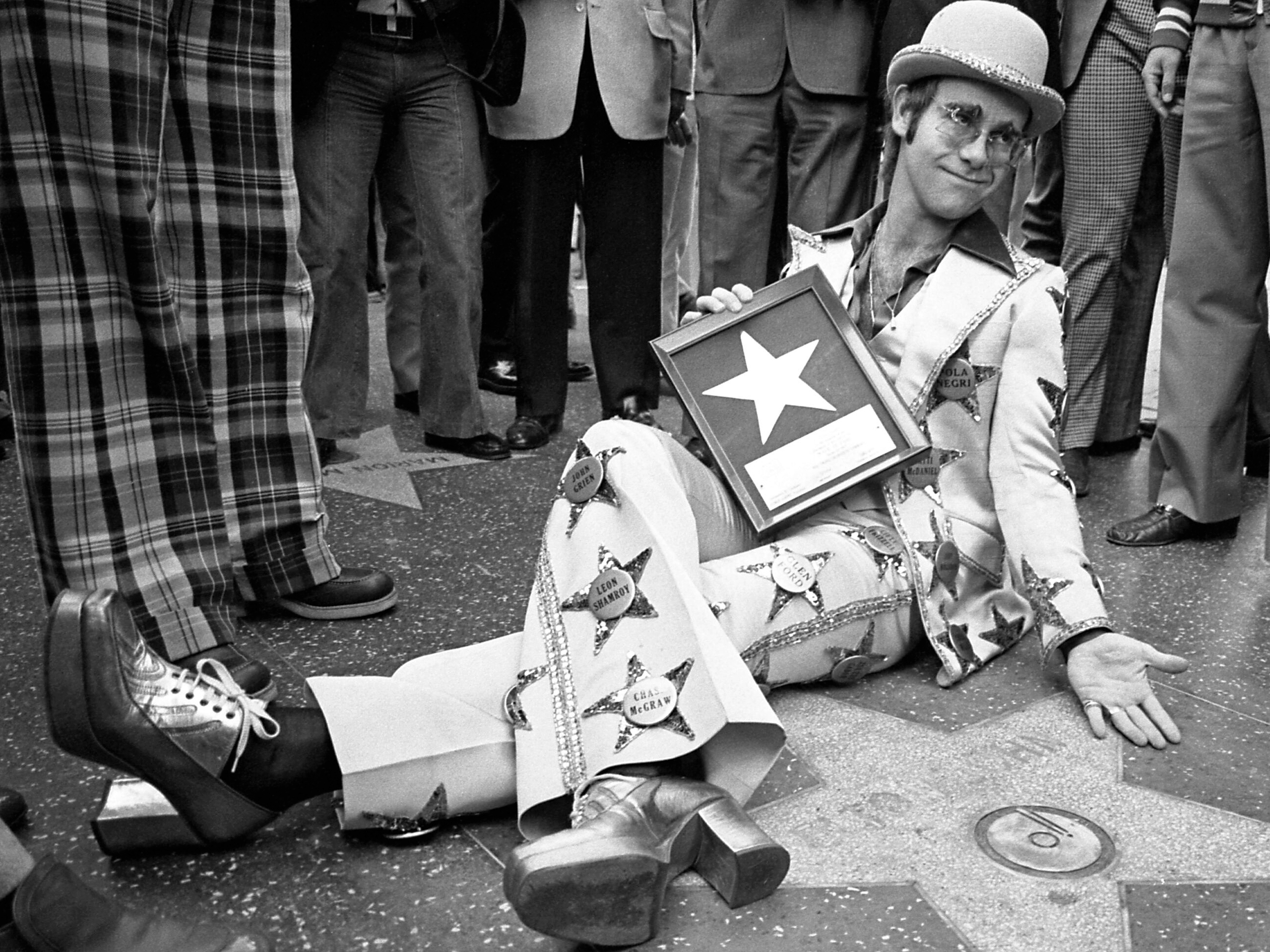
Elton John spent seven weeks at number one in 1975, the most by any act.

The Billboard Hot 100 is a chart published since August 1958 by Billboard magazine which ranks the best-performing singles in the United States. In 1975, it was compiled based on a combination of sales and airplay data sourced from surveys of retail outlets and playlists submitted by radio stations respectively. During the year, 35 different singles spent time at number one.

In the issue of Billboard dated January 4, Elton John moved into the number-one position with his recording of "Lucy in the Sky with Diamonds", originally recorded by the Beatles. The single retained the top spot on the chart dated January 11, but the subsequent 12 chart-toppers each spent only one week atop the listing, the longest run of consecutive single-week number ones in the Hot 100's history to that point. The sequence included the first Hot 100 number ones achieved by Barry Manilow, Ohio Players, Linda Ronstadt, Average White Band, the Eagles, the Doobie Brothers, Labelle, and Minnie Riperton. Additionally, Frankie Valli, who had topped the chart four times in the 1960s as the lead singer of the Four Seasons, earned his first number one song as a solo act during this period. John gained his second number one of the year in the issue dated April 12 when "Philadelphia Freedom", officially credited to the Elton John Band, took the top spot, and it retained its position the following week to end the lengthy run of one-week number ones. The band Earth, Wind & Fire gained its first chart-topper in May, and Freddy Fender and Captain & Tennille achieved the same feat in May and June respectively.

In September, David Bowie topped the Hot 100 for the first time with "Fame". The British singer, known for his constant reinvention, is one of the best-selling musicians of all time, with sales of over 100 million in his lifetime, and has been ranked by Rolling Stone magazine among the greatest singers, songwriters, and artists of all time. Van McCoy and the Soul City Symphony topped the chart for the first and only time in July, and the trio Hamilton, Joe Frank & Reynolds did the same four weeks later. KC and the Sunshine Band, Glen Campbell, and Silver Convention also reached the peak position for the first time in the second half of the year. Elton John had the most number ones of any act in 1975, topping the chart with three singles, and Neil Sedaka was one of four acts to have two number ones. Prior to 1975, Sedaka had not achieved a number one since 1962, but after a long period with little success in the United States, he was experiencing a career revival after John signed him to his record label. In addition to topping the chart twice as a performer, Sedaka also co-wrote the year's longest-running number one, "Love Will Keep Us Together" by Captain & Tennille, which spent four weeks in the top spot in June and July. The Eagles, John Denver, and KC and the Sunshine Band also had two number ones in 1975. There was significant crossover between the Hot 100 and Billboard's Hot Country Singles chart, with five singles topping both listings during 1975, as many as in the entirety of the preceding fifteen years. Crossover country pop music was at a peak in popularity, and songs by Campbell, Denver (who achieved the feat twice), B. J. Thomas, and Freddy Fender reached number one on both charts during the year.

== Chart history ==
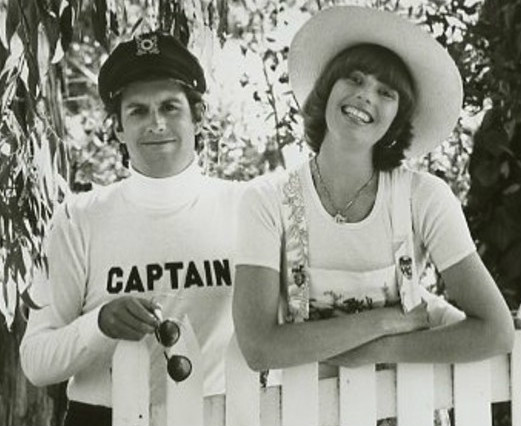
Captain & Tennille had the year's longest-running number one.

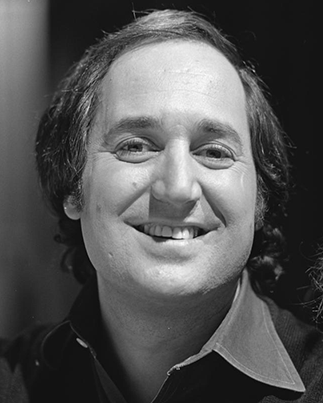
Neil Sedaka spent a total of four weeks at number one in 1975.

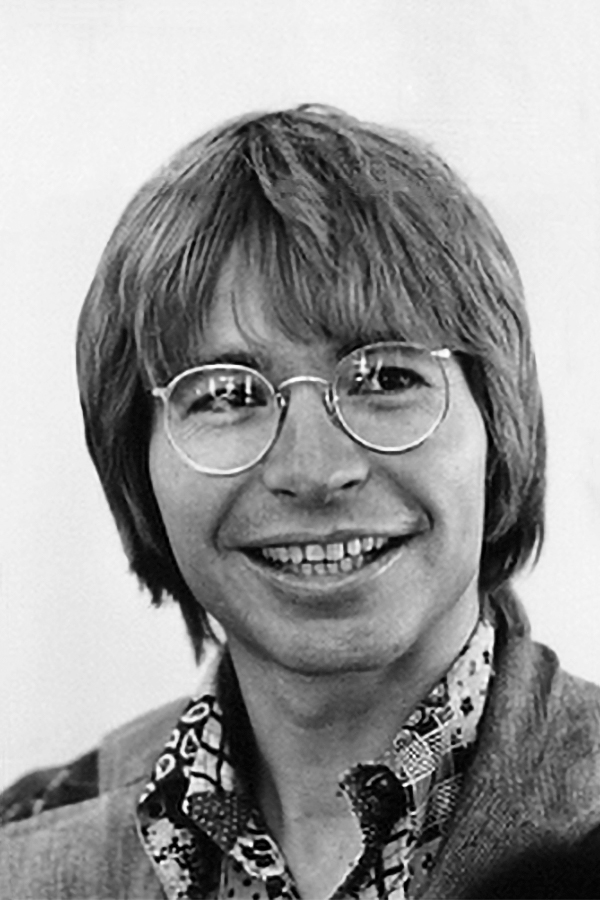
John Denver had two chart-toppers in 1975.

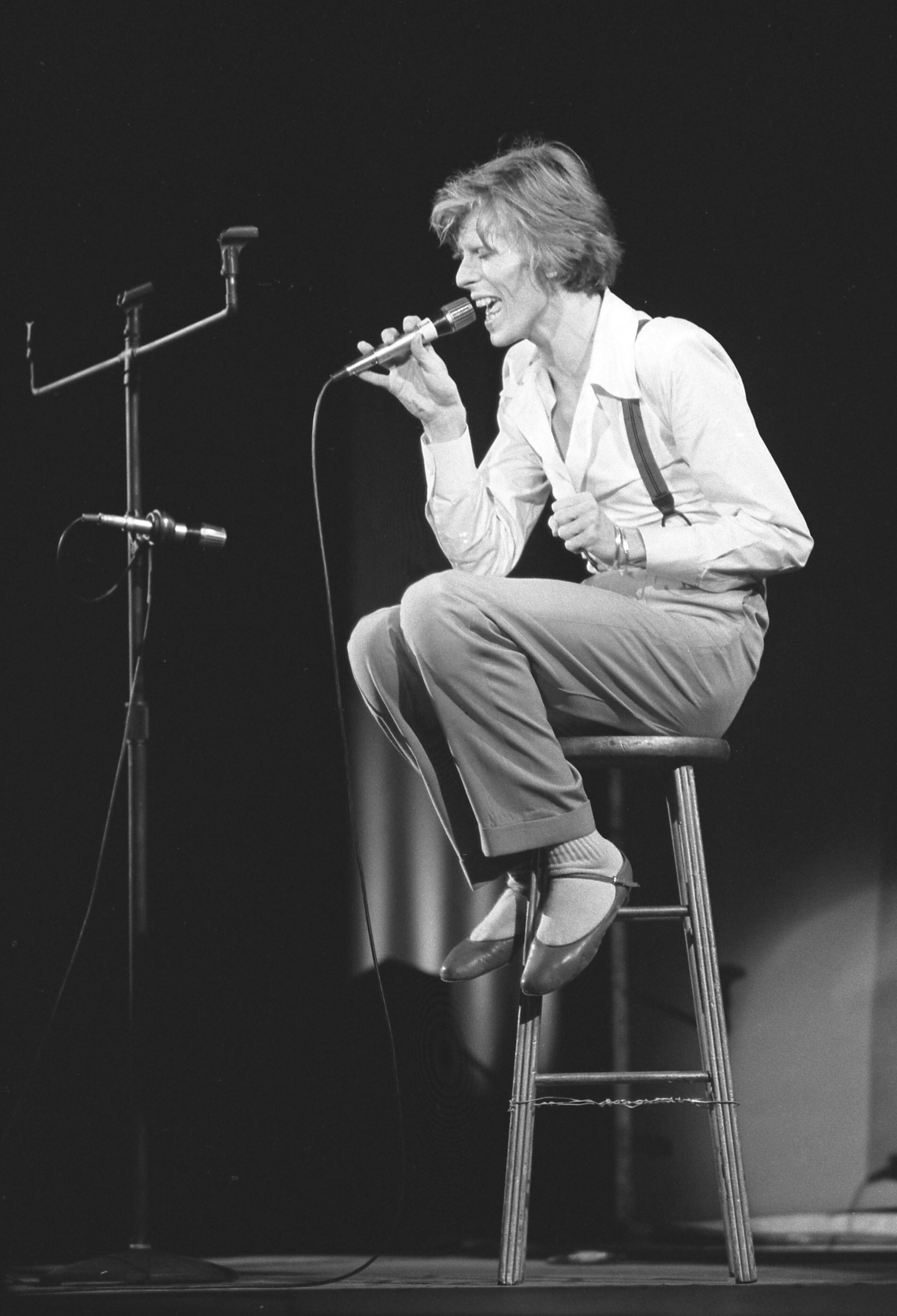
"Fame" was the first U.S. number one for David Bowie.

Chart history
No. (Note: The "No." column indicates the numerical sequence of number ones in Hot 100 history. "Re" indicates a single returning to number one.)	Issue date	Title	Artist(s)	Ref.
349	January 4	"Lucy in the Sky with Diamonds"	Elton John	
349	January 11	"Lucy in the Sky with Diamonds"	Elton John	
350	January 18	"Mandy"	Barry Manilow	
351	January 25	"Please Mr. Postman"	The Carpenters	
352	February 1	"Laughter in the Rain"	Neil Sedaka	
353	February 8	"Fire"	Ohio Players	
354	February 15	"You're No Good"	Linda Ronstadt	
355	February 22	"Pick Up the Pieces"	Average White Band	
356	March 1	"Best of My Love"	Eagles	
357	March 8	"Have You Never Been Mellow"	Olivia Newton-John	
358	March 15	"Black Water"	The Doobie Brothers	
359	March 22	"My Eyes Adored You"	Frankie Valli	
360	March 29	"Lady Marmalade"	Labelle	
361	April 5	"Lovin' You"	Minnie Riperton	
362	April 12	"Philadelphia Freedom"	Elton John Band	
362	April 19	"Philadelphia Freedom"	Elton John Band	
363	April 26	"(Hey Won't You Play); Another Somebody Done Somebody Wrong Song"	B. J. Thomas	
364	May 3	"He Don't Love You (Like I Love You)"	Tony Orlando and Dawn	
364	May 10	"He Don't Love You (Like I Love You)"	Tony Orlando and Dawn	
364	May 17	"He Don't Love You (Like I Love You)"	Tony Orlando and Dawn	
365	May 24	"Shining Star"	Earth, Wind & Fire	
366	May 31	"Before the Next Teardrop Falls"	Freddy Fender	
367	June 7	"Thank God I'm a Country Boy"	John Denver	
368	June 14	"Sister Golden Hair"	America	
369	June 21	"Love Will Keep Us Together"	Captain & Tennille	
369	June 28	"Love Will Keep Us Together"	Captain & Tennille	
369	July 5	"Love Will Keep Us Together"	Captain & Tennille	
369	July 12	"Love Will Keep Us Together"	Captain & Tennille	
370	July 19	"Listen to What the Man Said"	Wings	
371	July 26	"The Hustle"	Van McCoy and the Soul City Symphony	
372	August 2	"One of These Nights"	Eagles	
373	August 9	"Jive Talkin'"	Bee Gees	
373	August 16	"Jive Talkin'"	Bee Gees	
374	August 23	"Fallin' in Love"	Hamilton, Joe Frank & Reynolds	
375	August 30	"Get Down Tonight"	KC and the Sunshine Band	
376	September 6	"Rhinestone Cowboy"	Glen Campbell	
376	September 13	"Rhinestone Cowboy"	Glen Campbell	
377	September 20	"Fame"	David Bowie	
378	September 27	"I'm Sorry"	John Denver	
377 (re)	October 4	"Fame"	David Bowie	
379	October 11	"Bad Blood"	Neil Sedaka	
379	October 18	"Bad Blood"	Neil Sedaka	
379	October 25	"Bad Blood"	Neil Sedaka	
380	November 1	"Island Girl"	Elton John	
380	November 8	"Island Girl"	Elton John	
380	November 15	"Island Girl"	Elton John	
381	November 22	"That's the Way (I Like It)"	KC and the Sunshine Band	
382	November 29	"Fly, Robin, Fly"	Silver Convention	
382	December 6	"Fly, Robin, Fly"	Silver Convention	
382	December 13	"Fly, Robin, Fly"	Silver Convention	
381 (re)	December 20	"That's the Way (I Like It)"	KC and the Sunshine Band	
383	December 27	"Let's Do It Again"	The Staple Singers	

== Number-one artists ==
List of number-one artists by total weeks at number one
Weeks at No. 1	Artist
7	Elton John
4	Captain & Tennille
4	Neil Sedaka
3	Tony Orlando and Dawn
3	Silver Convention
3	KC and the Sunshine Band
2	Eagles
2	Bee Gees
2	Glen Campbell
2	John Denver
2	David Bowie
1	Barry Manilow
1	The Carpenters
1	Ohio Players
1	Linda Ronstadt
1	Average White Band
1	Olivia Newton-John
1	The Doobie Brothers
1	Frankie Valli
1	Labelle
1	Minnie Ripperton
1	Earth, Wind & Fire
1	Freddy Fender
1	America
1	Wings
1	Van McCoy and the Soul City Symphony
1	Hamilton, Joe Frank & Reynolds
1	The Staple Singers

== See also ==
- 1975 in music
- List of Cash Box Top 100 number-one singles of 1975
- List of Billboard Hot 100 number-one singles of the 1970s
