= Sunday Sharpe =

American country music singer

- Genres: Country
- Occupation: Singer
- Instrument: Vocals
- Years active: 1974-1977
- Labels: United Artists

Sunday Sharpe is an American country music singer. She charted seven times on the Hot Country Songs chart in the 1970s, reaching the Top 20 with "I'm Having Your Baby" (a female version of Paul Anka's "(You're) Having My Baby") and "A Little at a Time". She released one album, I'm Having Your Baby, for United Artists Records.

== Discography ==
=== Albums ===
Year	Album details	Peak chart positions
Year	Album details	US Country
1975	I'm Having Your Baby: Label: United Artists Records	46

=== Singles ===
Year	Single	Chart Positions	
Year	Single	US Country	CAN Country
1974	"I'm Having Your Baby"	11	40
1974	"Mr. Songwriter"	47	—
1975	"Put Your Head on My Shoulder"	48	—
1976	"Find a New Love, Girl"	80	—
1976	"A Little at a Time"	18	48
1977	"I'm Not the One You Love (I'm the One You Make Love To)"	62	—
1977	"Hold On Tight"	45	—
