= (You're) Having My Baby =

- German sleeve

Single by Paul Anka featuring Odia Coates

from the album Anka
- B-side: "Papa"
- Released: June 1974 (US)
- Recorded: 1974
- Genre: Soft rock; easy listening
- Length: 2:32
- Label: United Artists Records UA-XW454-W
- Songwriter: Paul Anka
- Producer: Rick Hall

Paul Anka featuring Odia Coates singles chronology
"Let Me Get to Know You" (1974)	"(You're) Having My Baby" (1974)	"One Man Woman/One Woman Man" (1974)

Audio sample
- file; help

"(You're) Having My Baby" is a song written and recorded in 1974 by Canadian singer Paul Anka. Recorded as a duet with female vocalist Odia Coates, the song became Anka's first No. 1 hit on the Billboard Hot 100 in 15 years, since 1959's "Lonely Boy".

== Song information ==
Anka, whose last chart-topping hit had been 1959's "Lonely Boy", had written the song for his wife and their four daughters while appearing at Lake Tahoe. The song was going to be a solo effort by Anka, but the unknown Coates, whom Anka had met while on tour, was at the studio during the recording session. Upon suggestion by United Artists recording executive Bob Skaff, the song became a duet. Released in late June 1974, "(You're) Having My Baby" climbed the chart and became Anka's third No. 1 song. A follow-up single "One Man Woman/One Woman Man", reached the Top 10 in early 1975.

== Criticism and controversy ==
Despite its commercial success, the song has been criticized for its maudlin sentimentality and perceived sexist undertones, and has appeared in many "worst songs" lists. It was voted the #1 "Worst Song of All Time" in a poll conducted by CNN.com in 2006.

Peter Reilly, in a February 1975 review of the album from which it originated, for what was then known as Stereo Review, stated that the song "defeats critical evaluation with the same brashly sure grasp of the popular mood as his equally dismal "Diana" of years ago. Everybody knows Anka can do better (he proved it easily with "My Way"), but he still composes and sings as if he were working on his first million and his fondest wish was an appearance on Dick Clark's show. '(You're) Having My Baby' is (really) The Worst. He grunts out the unforgettable lyrics, 'Yuh're havin' muh baybee/Whad a lovely way of sayin' how much yuh love me . . . Oh the seed inside you baybee/Do you feel it growin'?' in an Elvis-like roar while what sounds like Mantovani's orchestra swoons around him (Actually, the Johnny Harris Orchestra who also resurrected Shirley Bassey's career in 1970}. Yet I'll admit, dammit, that after hearing it only once I caught myself vacantly humming it, exactly as I did years ago with "Diana". All of which probably proves that Anka has some powerful natural gift of communication no matter how much one objects to the message."

The song was also criticized for declaring the child was the man's, rather than the couple's. Anka defended his choice in a 1974 interview, saying, "it's not meant to alienate anyone. I could have called it 'having our baby', but the other just sounded better. It's not a male ego trip—my baby." Anka did sometimes sing the line as "you're having our baby" while performing in concert. While reviewing a 2005 concert, Dan MacIntosh of PopMatters noted that while Anka had "covered most of his career highlights", he had "wisely neglected to include 'You're Having My Baby.'"

Others criticized a line stating that while the woman could have "swept it from [her] life" (a euphemism for having an abortion, which had recently been legalized across the United States through the Roe v. Wade Supreme Court ruling), she had not because it was "a wonderful way of showing how much she loves him". In response, Anka said the song was "a love song". He also explained in 1974, "what I'm saying in the song is that there is a choice. The libbers will get on me; I can't help that. I am into the antihuman thing, and I do understand the other side of it. There are those who can't cope, and it's not in the cards for them to have kids. I'm a libber myself, in the sense that ... if you've got to abort, you do. Some people just can't cope."

The National Organization for Women gave Anka (and, for the unrelated album Unborn Child, Seals and Crofts) the "Keep Her in Her Place" award during "its annual putdown of male chauvinism" in the media on Women's Equality Day. Ms. magazine "awarded" Anka their "Male Chauvinistic Pig of the Year" award.

== Chart performance ==
=== Weekly charts ===
Chart (1974)	Peak position
Australia (Kent Music Report)	2
Canada (RPM) Top Singles	1
Canada (RPM) Adult Contemporary	19
Germany	15
Ireland (IRMA)	4
UK	6
US Billboard Hot 100	1
US Billboard Adult Contemporary	5
US Cashbox Top 100	1

=== Year-end charts ===
Chart (1974)	Rank
Australia (Kent Music Report)	15
Canada	7
US Billboard Hot 100	28
US Cash Box	24

== Sunday Sharpe version ==
Around the same time "(You're) Having My Baby" was climbing the Hot 100, female country vocalist Sunday Sharpe recorded a cover version called "I'm Having Your Baby." With lyrics altered to the female perspective, "I'm Having Your Baby" peaked at No. 11 on the Billboard Hot Country Singles chart in October 1974.

== See also ==
- List of music considered the worst
