= My Home Town =

Single by Paul Anka
- B-side: "Something Happened"
- Released: April 1960
- Genre: Pop
- Length: 2:28
- Label: ABC-Paramount
- Songwriter(s): Paul Anka

Paul Anka singles chronology
"Puppy Love" (1960)	"My Home Town" (1960)	"Hello Young Lovers" (1960)

"My Home Town" is a song written and performed by Paul Anka. The song was arranged by Sid Feller. It reached #8 on the U.S. pop chart in 1960 and #10 in the Canadian CHUM Charts. The song's lyrics describe a person's happiness in their home town and them being with their love in said town.

== Other Facts ==
- The single's B-side, "Something Happened", reached #41 on the U.S. pop chart.
- The song ranked #77 on Billboard magazine's Top 100 singles of 1960.

== Other versions ==
- César Costa, 1961
- Juan Gabriel released a version of the song featuring Anka on his 2009 album Mis Canciones, Mis Amigos. The version had been originally released on Anka's 1998 album Amigos.
