= You Are My Destiny (song) =

- Japanese release picture sleeve

Single by Paul Anka

from the album Paul Anka Sings His Big 15
- B-side: "When I Stop Loving You (That'll Be the Day)"
- Released: 1957
- Recorded: 1957
- Genre: Pop
- Length: 2:42
- Label: ABC-Paramount
- Songwriter(s): Paul Anka

Paul Anka singles chronology
"Tell Me That You Love Me" (1957)	"You Are My Destiny" (1957)	"Crazy Love" (1958)

"You Are My Destiny" is a song written and performed by Paul Anka. It was recorded in September 1957 and released in late fall 1957, reaching number seven on the US Billboard 100 early in 1958, number fourteen on the R&B chart, and number two in Canada. The song was also released in the UK, where it reached number six. The flip-side was also number 39 in Canada.

== Charts ==
Chart (1958)	Peak position
Belgium (Ultratop 50 Flanders)	3
Belgium (Ultratop 50 Wallonia)	4
Canada (CHUM Hit Parade)	2
UK Singles (OCC)	6
US Top 100 Sides (Billboard)	7
US R&B Best Sellers in Stores (Billboard)	14

== Cover versions ==
- The same year of the Paul Anka release, Dalida released a French version called "Tu m'étais destinée".
- In 1959, the Argentine vocal group Los Cinco Latinos released a Spanish version under the title "Tu eres mi destino".
- In 1960, Italian rock singer Mina recorded an English-language version with fellow Italian band, the Happy Boys. Their rendition was later used in a dancing scene in the American drama film The Brutalist (2024).
- In 1975, French artist Guy Bonnardot released a French version as the B-side of "Oui, Je Suis Fou D'amour (Crazy Love)" on EMI Pathé.
- For the 2007 album Classic Songs, My Way, Anka re-recorded the song as a duet with Michael Bublé.
- In 2009, Greek artist Vassilikos released his own cover of the song in his debut solo album "Vintage: Songs I Wish I Had Written".

== See also ==
- My Destiny (disambiguation)
