= Times of Your Life =

Single by Paul Anka

from the album Times of Your Life
- B-side: "Water Runs Deep"
- Released: November 1975
- Recorded: 1975
- Genre: Pop
- Length: 3:10
- Label: United Artists Records
- Songwriters: Roger Nichols, Bill Lane
- Producer: Bob Skaff

Paul Anka singles chronology
"(I Believe) There's Nothing Stronger Than Our Love" (1975)	"Times of Your Life" (1975)	"Anytime (I'll Be There)" (1976)

"Times of Your Life" is a popular song and advertising jingle made famous in the 1970s by Canadian singer Paul Anka, who recorded it in 1975 for an album of the same title. It was written by Roger Nichols (melody) and Bill Lane (lyrics).

Kodak created an advertising campaign in 1975 that featured Anka singing a jingle entitled "Times of Your Life". While the tune was being heard across the United States in a commercial, Anka decided to record and release it as a single in late 1975. The song became a hit in the U.S., reaching number seven on the Billboard Hot 100 chart in February 1976 and remaining in the Top 40 for 12 weeks. The previous month, "Times of Your Life" had spent one week atop the Billboard easy listening (adult contemporary) chart, Anka's only recording to do so. It was Anka's twelfth and final Billboard Top Ten hit.

Anka began including the song in his concert appearances, particularly during his shows in Las Vegas, Nevada. The performance is often accompanied by a video montage featuring Anka and his family and friends. In 2015, Anka's recording was used in a series of retrospective promos for the final season of the AMC television series Mad Men.

In 2021, the song was featured in a commercial for Downy. In 2022, it was used in the seventh episode of the Apple TV+ series Severance.

== Chart performance ==
=== Weekly charts ===
Chart (1975–1976)	Peak position
Canada RPM Top Singles	31
Canada RPM Adult Contemporary	9
U.S. Billboard Hot 100	7
U.S. Billboard Easy Listening	1

=== Year-end charts ===
Chart (1976)	Rank
U.S. Billboard Hot 100	54
U.S. Billboard Easy Listening	19

== Cover versions ==
- Teresa Carpio (for her album Teresa Carpio)
- Martin Nievera (for his 2004 album Unforgettable and again for the 2012 Filipino melodrama series Lorenzo's Time)
- Joanna Wang (for her 2009 album Joanna & Wang Ruo-lin)
- Jed Madela (for his 2010 covers album The Classics Album)
- The Company (for their 2015 covers album Nostalgia)

== See also ==
- List of number-one adult contemporary singles of 1976 (U.S.)
- "To the Virgins, to Make Much of Time"

Anka "Gather moments while you may" cf. Herrick "Gather ye rosebuds while ye may"
