= It's Time to Cry =

1959 song by Paul Anka

Single by Paul Anka

from the album Paul Anka Sings His Big 15
- B-side: "Something Has Changed Me"
- Released: October 1959
- Genre: Pop
- Length: 2:24
- Label: ABC Paramount; Columbia
- Songwriter(s): Anka

Paul Anka singles chronology
"Put Your Head on My Shoulder" (1959)	"It's Time to Cry" (1959)	"Puppy Love" (1959)

"It's Time to Cry" is a song written and performed by singer-songwriter Paul Anka. It was released in October 1959.

== Content and composition ==
The song, at two minutes and twenty-four seconds long, is in the key of D sharp / E flat major, with a tempo of 74 beats per minute. Its lyrical content is about how a partner ending their relationship with you leads to heartbreak, loneliness and sadness, with Anka writing that such an occasion would be "the time to cry" for both people involved.

== Reception and chart performance ==
A Billboard writer called the song and its B-side, "strong ballad efforts, read in hit style, nicely chanted over lush chorus and orchestra backing," while Cashbox wrote of the song, "It's Time to Cry should easily follow in the footsteps of 'Put Your Head on My Shoulder,' for the talented singer-cleffer, who keeps turning out one rock-a-ballad chart smash after another. Chorus and orchestra superbly assist Anka as he waxes this emotional romancer with heartfelt sincerity."

"It's Time to Cry" debuted at number 8 on Billboard's Bubbling Under Hot 100 chart for the week of November 23, 1959. The following week, it debuted at number 74 on the main Hot 100, peaking at number 4 and charting there for a total of 15 weeks. It was also ranked by Billboard as the 66th biggest song of 1960, and by Cashbox as their 46th biggest song of 1960. In addition, the song reached 28 in the United Kingdom, 5 in Canada, 18 in Australia, and 2 in Italy.

The song was covered by The Lettermen for their 1964 album, She Cried.
