= Lonely Boy (Paul Anka song) =

Single by Paul Anka
- B-side: "Your Love"
- Released: May 11, 1959
- Recorded: August 27, 1958
- Studio: Bell Sound (New York City)
- Genre: Pop
- Length: 2:31
- Label: ABC-Paramount
- Songwriter: Paul Anka

Paul Anka singles chronology
"I Miss You So" (1959)	"Lonely Boy" (1959)	"Put Your Head on My Shoulder" (1959)

"Lonely Boy" is a song written and recorded by Paul Anka. Recorded in August 1958 with Don Costa's orchestra in New York, "Lonely Boy" was not released until May 11, 1959. Anka also sang this song in the film Girls Town, which was released in October 1959. When released as a single, it topped the Billboard Hot 100 for four weeks, becoming Anka's first song to do so, although he had earlier topped Billboard's Best Sellers in Stores chart with "Diana". Billboard ranked it as No. 5 for 1959. The song reached No. 2 on the Canadian CHUM Charts.

In 2007, "Lonely Boy" appeared on the Classic Songs (greatest hits) disc of Anka's album Classic Songs, My Way. In 2018, the song was listed at number 235 on the 60th Anniversary of the Billboard Hot 100.

== See also ==
- Lonely Boy (film)
- List of Hot 100 number-one singles of 1959 (U.S.)
