= One Man Woman/One Woman Man =

- German release picture sleeve

Single by Paul Anka with Odia Coates

from the album Anka
- B-side: "Let Me Get to Know You"
- Released: 1974
- Genre: Pop, disco
- Length: 2:58
- Label: United Artists
- Songwriter: Paul Anka
- Producers: Denny Diante and Spencer Proffer

Paul Anka with Odia Coates singles chronology
""(You're) Having My Baby”" (1974)	"One Man Woman/One Woman Man" (1974)	"“I Don't Like to Sleep Alone"" (1975)

"One Man Woman/One Woman Man" is a song written by Canadian singer-songwriter Paul Anka. Anka recorded the song as a duet with Odia Coates, the second of four consecutive duets with Coates that he released as singles and became hits. The 1974 single release was an international hit, peaking at No. 7 on the Billboard Hot 100, No. 5 on the Billboard Easy Listening chart and No. 2 in Canada. Like most of Anka's and Coates's songs, it performed poorly in recurrent rotation, and ranked among the songs with the most drop-off in airplay from 1975.

== Synopsis ==
Performed as a duet, the man admits to having an affair and being a "two-timing man," acknowledging he has let his lover, the duet partner, down, as she is a "one-man woman." In the end, he promises to be a "one-woman man" in the future. His lover ultimately agrees to take him back because she would rather forgive his indiscretions than live without him.
