= Philadelphia Freedom (song) =

1975 single by Elton John

Single by Elton John

from the album Captain Fantastic and the Brown Dirt Cowboy
- B-side: "I Saw Her Standing There" (live with John Lennon)
- Released: 28 February 1975
- Recorded: August 17, 1974 (basic tracking) / August 21, 1974 (Elton's lead vocals)
- Studio: Caribou Ranch, Sound Factory (Hollywood)
- Genre: Philly soul; pop; disco
- Length: 5:38 (album version); 5:20 (edited version)
- Label: MCA; DJM
- Songwriters: Elton John; Bernie Taupin
- Producer: Gus Dudgeon

Elton John singles chronology
"Lucy in the Sky with Diamonds" (1974)	"Philadelphia Freedom" (1975)	"Someone Saved My Life Tonight" (1975)

Licensed audio
- "Philadelphia Freedom" on YouTube

"Philadelphia Freedom" is a song by British musician Elton John and lyricist Bernie Taupin, and performed by John. It was released as a single on 28 February 1975, credited to the Elton John Band. The song was the fourth of John's six number-one singles in the US during the early and mid-1970s, which saw his recordings dominating the charts. In Canada, it was his eighth single to hit the top of the RPM national singles chart.

The song was written by John and Taupin as a favor to John's friend, tennis star Billie Jean King, who was part of the Philadelphia Freedoms professional tennis team. The song features an orchestral arrangement by Gene Page that includes flutes, horns and strings.

The song made its album debut on 1977's Elton John's Greatest Hits Volume II.

== Background ==
Recorded on August 17 and 21, 1974, the song was at the time the only song Elton John and Bernie Taupin had ever consciously written as a single, as John told journalist Paul Gambaccini. John was looking to honor Billie Jean King, and so asked Taupin to write a song called "Philadelphia Freedom" as a homage to her tennis team, the Philadelphia Freedoms.

In His Song: The Musical History of Elton John, Elizabeth Rosenthal recounts that Taupin said, "I can't write a song about tennis", and did not. Taupin maintains that the lyrics bear no relation to tennis, Philadelphia soul, or even flag-waving patriotism. Nonetheless, the lyrics have been interpreted as patriotic and uplifting, and even though it was released in 1975, the song's sentiment, intentionally or not, meshed perfectly with an American music audience gearing up for the country's bicentennial celebration in July 1976. In the US, the song was certified Gold in 1975 and Platinum in 1995 by the Recording Industry Association of America. Billboard ranked it as the number three song for 1975.

The song was dedicated in part to "the Philadelphia sound", which included the soul music of the Delfonics and the Spinners and the talents of writer-producers Kenny Gamble, Leon Huff, and Thom Bell; John would work with Bell two years later on an EP that came to be known as The Thom Bell Sessions. "Philadelphia Freedom" plays in Philadelphia's Franklin Institute IMAX Theater before every show as a tribute to the city's love for freedom and its impact on the country. The lyrics are also printed on the walls of the Hard Rock Cafe in Philadelphia. John performed the song when he was invited to be a musical guest on the May 17, 1975 edition of Soul Train.

The B-side, a cover of the Beatles' "I Saw Her Standing There", is a live recording of the Elton John Band with John Lennon at Madison Square Garden on 28 November 1974. It was the last of three songs John and Lennon performed together that night; the performance would be Lennon's last concert appearance. Three songs from that collaboration were featured on the 1975 12" EP Elton John Band featuring John Lennon and the Muscle Shoals Horns (DJM). These recordings can also be found on the Lennon box set and the remastered edition of John's Here and There album.

=== Billie Jean King ===
Elton John met Billie Jean King in 1973 and, according to reporters for CNN, they have since built a "powerful partnership in philanthropy, raising hundreds of millions of dollars...for equal rights and for HIV/AIDS causes". Upon admiring and meeting King, John asked his long-term writing partner Bernie Taupin to write the lyrics to what became "Philadelphia Freedom" and dedicate it to his friend, King, who was a member of the Philadelphia Freedoms tennis team. The label on the vinyl for this record reads "with Love to B.J.K. and the sound of Philadelphia." At the time, King had just been ranked the "World Number 1 women's player" for the fifth time in the previous seven years. Additionally, one reporter argued that she had "alter[ed] the gender perception of professional tennis with her victory against Bobby Riggs in a highly publicized 'Battle of the Sexes' exhibition match."

The lyrics of "Philadelphia Freedom" are not explicitly about the match or King, but stem from a love of King and her cause. Prior to their match, Riggs claimed that even as a 55-year-old man, he could still beat a woman (King was 29 at the time) in a tennis match because it was a man's game. The match was held on 20 September 1973 at the Astrodome in Houston, and was telecast worldwide. Though usually cheering from the sidelines at every match, John lost his voice cheering King on from a Los Angeles hotel. The year before the "Battle of the Sexes" match, Congress adopted the Equal Rights Amendment (Note: As of 2020, the subsequent ratification of the Equal Rights Amendment by the states is in dispute.) and 1973 saw the decision of Roe v. Wade give women the right to choose to have an abortion. King made other steps in feminism in 1973 when she founded the Women's Tennis Association and "convinced the U.S. Open to award female champions the same prize money as men". This set the scene for King's match and victory against Riggs.

The win ignited even more advocacy efforts for sexual equality, shattered the stereotype Riggs had presented and, as feminist Gloria Steinem put it, "provided...a morale change". King is now known as a "champion for social change and equal rights".

Despite her success in the match and its historical importance, King told eltonjohn.com that they (she and Elton) did not want the song to be about tennis. "It's a feeling", she said. King and John also co-founded the World Team Tennis Smash Hits, a charity function benefitting AIDS charities. King spoke of her work with Elton, saying "We're out there every single day with our energy and we're going to make this world a better place, no matter if it's through tennis, through music, whatever, to try to help the LGBT community, just help humanity."

On 18 October 2023, King competed in the tenth season of The Masked Singer as Royal Hen, singing "Philadelphia Freedom" in an episode that was a tribute to Elton John.

== Reception ==
Cash Box said that it has "a thumping heartbeat", "big production", "soaring strings and bleating horns". Record World said that "Gene Page charts provide local color for EJ's latest not-available-on-LP smash."

The single reached No. 2 in New Zealand, No. 4 in Australia and No. 12 in the UK.

The song re-emerged onto the charts following the Philadelphia Eagles win over the Kansas City Chiefs in Super Bowl LIX on February 9, 2025, with many fans singing and dancing to the song on social media as a way of celebrating the Eagles' win over the Chiefs, thus getting rid of the heartbreak they had from the matchup from two years prior and all season long when the NFL was accused of having its referees rig the games the Chiefs play in favor of them winning, and giving the team and its fans their very own "Philadelphia freedom".

== Charts ==
=== Weekly charts ===
Chart (1975)	Peak position
Australia (Kent Music Report)	4
Belgium (Ultratop 50 Wallonia)	49
Canada Top Singles (RPM)	1
New Zealand (Recorded Music NZ)	2
UK Singles (Official Charts)	12
US Billboard Hot 100	1
US Hot R&B/Hip-Hop Songs (Billboard)	32
West Germany (GfK)	50

=== Year-end charts ===
Chart (1975)	Rank
Australia (Kent Music Report)	56
Brazil	12
Canada (RPM)	5
New Zealand	14
US Billboard Hot 100	3

=== All-time charts ===
Chart (1958–2018)	Position
US Billboard Hot 100	192

== Certifications ==
Region	Certification	Certified units/sales
New Zealand (RMNZ)	Gold	15,000^{‡}
United States (RIAA)	Platinum	1,000,000^{^}
^{^} Shipments figures based on certification alone.^{‡} Sales+streaming figures based on certification alone.

== Cover versions ==
The song was covered by Hall & Oates on the 1991 multi-artist tribute album Two Rooms; and by MFSB on their 1975 album of the same name.

== Personnel ==
- Elton John – electric piano, vocals
- Ray Cooper – tambourine, maracas, congas
- Davey Johnstone – electric and acoustic guitars
- Dee Murray – bass
- Nigel Olsson – drums
- Gene Page – orchestral arrangement

== See also ==
- Streets of Philadelphia
