= I Don't Like to Sleep Alone =

Single by Paul Anka

from the album Feelings
- B-side: "How Can Anything Be Beautiful—After You"
- Released: March 1975
- Genre: Pop
- Length: 3:14
- Label: United Artists
- Songwriter: Paul Anka
- Producer: Rick Hall

Paul Anka singles chronology
"One Man Woman/One Woman Man" (1974)	"I Don't Like to Sleep Alone" (1975)	"(I Believe) There's Nothing Stronger Than Our Love" (1975)

"I Don't Like to Sleep Alone" is a song written by Paul Anka and performed by Anka featuring Odia Coates. It was featured on his 1975 album Feelings. The song was arranged by Jimmie Haskell and produced by Rick Hall.

== Chart performance ==
In his native Canada, the song reached #1 on both the Canadian pop chart and Adult Contemporary chart In the US, the song went to #8 on both the U.S. pop and Easy Listening charts in 1975.

== Certifications ==
Region	Certification	Certified units/sales
Canada (Music Canada)	Gold	75,000^{^}
^{^} Shipments figures based on certification alone.

== Other facts ==
- The song was nominated for the Juno Award for Single of the Year in 1976, but lost to "You Ain't Seen Nothing Yet" by Bachman–Turner Overdrive.
- The song ranked #73 on Billboard magazine's Top 100 singles of 1975.
