= Laughter in the Rain =

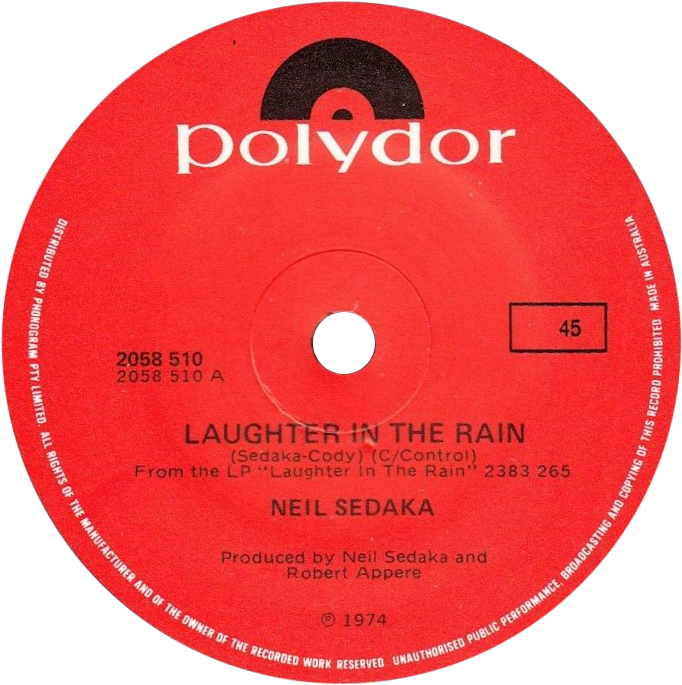
- Side A of Australian single

Single by Neil Sedaka

from the album Sedaka's Back
- B-side: "Endlessly" (US); "Kiddio" (UK); "Betty Grable" (Belgium); "For the Good of the Cause" (Brazil)
- Released: October 1974
- Recorded: 1974
- Genre: Pop, soft rock
- Length: 2:53
- Label: Rocket (US); Polydor (Europe)
- Songwriters: Neil Sedaka; Phil Cody
- Producers: Neil Sedaka; Robert Appere

Neil Sedaka singles chronology
"The Way I Am" (1974)	"Laughter in the Rain" (1974)	"The Immigrant" (1975)

Official audio
- "Laughter In The Rain" on YouTube

"Laughter in the Rain" is a song composed and recorded by Neil Sedaka, with lyrics by Phil Cody. It includes a 20-second saxophone solo by Jim Horn. The song hit No. 1 on the Billboard Hot 100 in February 1975.

== Background ==
The song was first released by English singer Peter Gordeno in May 1974; unauthorized pre-release cover versions of records are legal and more common in the UK due to the nature of the music industry and regulatory structure there. Several months later, an R&B version by singer Lea Roberts was released. After hearing Roberts' version of "Laughter in the Rain" on the radio several weeks before the planned release of his single, Sedaka phoned Elton John to have MCA Records rush the Sedaka version to release within five days; Sedaka remarked that he felt some guilt for upstaging Roberts, whose version impressed him, but was so eager for a hit after not having one in the United States in ten years that he decided doing so would be worthwhile.

Sedaka's version was released on Elton John's Rocket label in the US and on the Polydor label in the UK and elsewhere.

The opening chord of the chorus was based on that used by John in "Goodbye Yellow Brick Road", which Sedaka described as a "drop-dead chord." He combined that with a pentatonic melody inspired by Aaron Copland.

Cody conceived the idea of the lyrics describing a couple frolicking during rainy weather; he noted that the skies were sunny when he wrote the song. He also recalled experiencing writer's block when initially attempting to write the lyrics at first, but after a two-hour outdoor nap aided by a small amount of marijuana, the lyrics came to him, allowing him to finish the song in about five minutes:

Neil and I started writing the song early in the day and I just wasn't getting it. So, I went for a walk, smoked a very small amount of weed and sat under a tree and took a short nap. It was a bright sunny day, not a cloud in the sky and yet, when I got back to my post at Sedaka's right elbow, the lyric just fell onto the page with very little effort from me. Somewhere, in my consciousness, I guess I was having a Gene Kelly moment.

== Chart performance ==
In the U.S., "Laughter in the Rain" reached No. 1 on the Billboard Hot 100 on February 1, 1975 (Sedaka's first single to top the Hot 100 since 1962). The song spent two weeks at the top of the Adult Contemporary chart.

The record was also a major hit in Canada, reaching No. 2 on the pop singles chart and No. 1 on the adult contemporary chart. It was also released in the UK, where it spent nine weeks on the Singles Chart, peaking at No. 15 on June 22, 1974.

=== Weekly charts ===
Lea Roberts

Chart (1974)	Peak position
US Billboard Bubbling Under the Hot 100	109
US Billboard Hot Soul Singles	20

Neil Sedaka

Chart (1974–1975)	Peak position
Australia (Kent Music Report)	17
Canada RPM Top Singles	2
Canada RPM Adult Contemporary	1
Netherlands (Dutch Top 40)	35
UK Singles (Official Charts Company)	15
US Billboard Hot 100	1
US Billboard Adult Contemporary	1
US Cash Box Top 100	1
Yugoslavian Singles Chart	2

=== Year-end charts ===
Chart (1975)	Rank
Australia (Kent Music Report)	79
Canada	61
US Billboard Hot 100	8
US Cash Box Top 100	20

== Personnel ==
- Neil Sedaka – lead vocal, piano
- Danny Kortchmar – electric guitar
- Dean Parks - acoustic guitar
- Leland Sklar – bass guitar
- Russ Kunkel – drums
- Jim Horn – tenor saxophone, baritone saxophone
- William "Smitty" Smith – Hammond organ, background vocals
- Abigail Haness, Brenda Gordon, Brian Russell – background vocals
- Artie Butler – orchestral arrangement

== Other sources ==
- Whitburn, Joel (1996). The Billboard Book of Top 40 Hits, 6th Edition (Billboard Publications)
