= Crazy Love (Paul Anka song) =

"Crazy Love" is a song written and recorded by Paul Anka in 1958. It was released by ABC-Paramount Records as a single with the song, "Let the Bells Keep Ringing", on the b-side. Anka performed the song on Dick Clark's Saturday Night Show on April 5, 1957.

"Let the Bells Keep Ringing" reached number 4 in the Canadian CHUM Charts.

The Spanish adaptation of this song sounds in a film I am Cuba (1964).
