= Odia Coates =

American singer

Background information
- Born: November 13, 1941; Vicksburg, Mississippi, U.S.
- Died: May 19, 1991 (aged 49) Oakland Medical Center, Oakland, California, U.S.
- Genres: Adult contemporary, Pop
- Occupation: Singer
- Formerly of: Paul Anka

Odia Coates (November 13, 1941 – May 19, 1991) was an African-American singer, best known for her high-profile hits with Canadian singer-songwriter Paul Anka.

== Early life ==
The daughter of an evangelical minister, Odia Coates was born in Vicksburg, Mississippi. As a young child her family moved to Watts, California, where her father served as pastor in the Beautiful Gates Church Of God In Christ, where she sang in the church choir. She eventually became a member of the Northern California State Youth Choir, co-founded by Edwin Hawkins and later became a member of Sisters Love.

== Work with Paul Anka ==
Coates is best remembered for her duet with Paul Anka, "(You're) Having My Baby", that went to No. 1 on the Billboard Hot 100 on August 24-September 7, 1974. Having heard Coates singing on an Edwin Hawkins Singers gospel album, he decided to use her on the recording as it needed a female voice. Anka was pleased with the results (both artistically and commercially; the song reached number one) and recorded several more songs with her. The two recorded several more Top 10 & Top 20 hits, including 1974's "One Man Woman/One Woman Man" and 1975's "I Don't Like to Sleep Alone" and "(I Believe) There's Nothing Stronger Than Our Love". She recorded "Make It Up to Me in Love", a sequel to "One Man Woman/One Woman Man", with Anka in 1977.

In Australia, "One Man Woman" peaked at number 35, while "(I Believe) There's Nothing Stronger Than Our Love" peaked at number 83, both in 1975.

== Solo work ==
Coates had minor success as a solo artist with the Anka-penned track "You Come And You Go" and a cover of the Electric Light Orchestra song "Showdown". Both songs come from her only self-titled solo album released in 1975 by United Artists Records with producer Rick Hall. Coates also recorded "Make It Up To Me Baby", released on Buddah Records in 1973, written by Anka and Johnny Harris and very much sought after by soul collectors. She was working on solo album in Las Vegas at L.A.W. Recording Studios in 1984-5, with producer Lee Waters. Tracks were cut at LAW and Paramount and Sunset studios in LA.

== Death ==
Odia Coates died from breast cancer in 1991, aged 49, at Oakland Medical Center following a four-year battle with the disease.
