= Please Mr. Please =

- Side A of the Australian single

Single by Olivia Newton-John

from the album Have You Never Been Mellow
- B-side: "Don't Cry for Me Argentina" (UK); "And in the Morning" (US and rest of world)
- Released: June 1975
- Recorded: 1974
- Genre: Country pop
- Length: 3:31
- Label: EMI
- Songwriters: Bruce Welch, John Rostill
- Producer: John Farrar

Olivia Newton-John singles chronology
"Have You Never Been Mellow" (1975)	"Please Mr. Please" (1975)	"Something Better to Do" (1975)

"Please Mr. Please" is a song written by Bruce Welch and John Rostill, both members of British pop singer Cliff Richard's backing band, The Shadows. Welch had originally recorded the song himself in 1974 with no commercial success.

In 1975, British-Australian singer Olivia Newton-John recorded and released a version of the song as the second and final single from her fifth studio album, Have You Never Been Mellow.

== Song story ==
The song begins as an apparent tribute to the jukebox and how one can listen to a lot of great music for a small price. But instead of continuing along those lines, the song picks up on how some songs on the jukebox can trigger bad memories. This happens when the protagonist—at a tavern with friends, trying to get over a just-broken relationship—sees another customer at the jukebox, trying to play "B-17," which is coded to a song the woman does not want to hear.

The song, she cries, was special to the now-broken relationship. It now triggers sorrowful memories to the point that she never wants to hear the song again. The refrain sees the woman begging the "button-pushin' cowboy" (the ‘Mister’ of the song’s title) not to play the evocative song.

== Reception ==
Record World said that the song is "Olivia's most country-oriented outing yet will also speak as sweetly to her total audience for '. . Please' pleases pop just as perfectly!"

== Chart performance ==
Released as a single in 1975, "Please Mr. Please" reached the Top 10 on three major Billboard charts in the US that year. On the pop chart, the song peaked at #3 August 9, 1975, remaining in the Top 40 for 12 weeks: Newton-John's fifth consecutive Top Ten hit, "Please Mr. Please" would also mark Newton-John's last appearance in the top ten for a three-year period. On the country chart, the song reached #5 August 23rd, while on the adult contemporary chart, the song spent three weeks at #1 beginning July 12, 1975. The single was a certified Gold record by the RIAA.

=== Weekly charts ===
Chart (1975)	Peak position
Australian (Kent Music Report)	35
Canadian RPM Top Singles	1
Canadian RPM Country Tracks	1
Canadian RPM Adult Contemporary Tracks	1
New Zealand (RIANZ)	7
US Billboard Hot 100	3
US Billboard Hot Country Singles	5
US Billboard Easy Listening	1
US Cash Box Top 100	1
Quebec (ADISQ)	19

Chart (2022)	Peak position
US Digital Song Sales (Billboard)	48

=== Year-end charts ===
Chart (1975)	Rank
Canada RPM Top Singles	24
US Billboard Hot 100	49
US Cash Box Top 100	26

== Cover versions ==
- Juliana Hatfield covered the song on her album Juliana Hatfield Sings Olivia Newton-John.
- Claude François covered the song in a French language version titled "Pourquoi Pleurer (Sur Un Succès D'Été)," which was released as a single in France in 1975, and became the opener and title track of that year's album release by the singer.
- Venezuelan singer Nancy Ramos covered the song on her 1976 LP "Poderosa" in a Spanish language version titled "Dime Que Si".
- Salvadoran singer Evangelina Sol covered the song in a Spanish language version titled "Por favor Señor, por favor" on her 1975 album "Evangelina."
- Dickie Goodman used a sound-alike version of the chorus for his 1975 parody hit single, "Mr. Jaws."
- Bluegrass artist Rhonda Vincent covered the song in 2024.
