= Have You Never Been Mellow (song) =

1975 single by Olivia Newton-John

Single by Olivia Newton-John

from the album Have You Never Been Mellow
- B-side: "Water Under the Bridge"
- Released: January 1975
- Recorded: 1974
- Studio: Abbey Road Studios (London, England)
- Genre: Pop; country; adult contemporary
- Length: 3:31
- Label: EMI (UK); MCA (US)
- Songwriter: John Farrar
- Producer: John Farrar

Olivia Newton-John singles chronology
| "I Honestly Love You" (1974) | "Have You Never Been Mellow" (1975) | "Please Mr. Please" (1975) |

Music video
- "Olivia Newton-John - Have You Never Been Mellow" on YouTube

"Have You Never Been Mellow" is a song recorded by British-Australian singer Olivia Newton-John for her 1975 fifth studio album of the same name. Written and produced by John Farrar, the song was released as the lead single from the album in January 1975.

In the United States, the single became Newton-John's second consecutive number-one hit on the Billboard Hot 100, topping the chart in March 1975. It also topped the Adult Contemporary chart, and continued her success as a crossover artist when it peaked at number three on the Hot Country Songs chart. It also became her fourth consecutive single to receive a Gold certification by the Recording Industry Association of America (RIAA). The single also reached number one in Canada, and peaked at number ten in Newton-John's native Australia.

"Have You Never Been Mellow" was nominated for Best Pop Vocal Performance, Female at the 18th Annual Grammy Awards, but lost to Janis Ian's "At Seventeen".

== Track listing ==
1. "Have You Never Been Mellow" – 3:30
2. "Water Under the Bridge" – 3:05

== Charts ==
=== Weekly charts ===
| Chart (1975) | Peak position |
|---|---|
| Australia (Kent Music Report) | 10 |
| Canada Top Singles (RPM) | 1 |
| Canada Adult Contemporary (RPM) | 1 |
| Canada Country Singles (RPM) | 1 |
| Israel (Israeli Singles Chart) | 1 |
| New Zealand (Recorded Music NZ) | 12 |
| Quebec (ADISQ) | 4 |
| US Billboard Hot 100 | 1 |
| US Adult Contemporary (Billboard) | 1 |
| US Country (Billboard) | 3 |
| US Cash Box Top 100 | 1 |

| Chart (2022) | Peak position |
|---|---|
| Japan Hot Overseas (Billboard Japan) | 6 |
| US Digital Song Sales (Billboard) | 29 |

=== Year-end charts ===
| Chart (1975) | Rank |
|---|---|
| Australia (Kent Music Report) | 63 |
| Canada Top Singles (RPM) | 19 |
| Canada Adult Contemporary (RPM) | 2 |
| US Billboard Hot 100 | 36 |
| US Cash Box Top 100 | 19 |

== Cover versions ==
- A French cover recorded by Nicole Rieu, "Ma maison au bord de l'eau", was released in 1975.
- Hank Marvin recorded an instrumental version on his 'Hank Marvin Guitar Syndicate' album in 1977 (EMC 3215, 0C 062-06 553)
- The Seekers included a version on their 1980 album A Little Bit of Country
- Dionne Warwick performed the song on the live album A Man and a Woman. Another live version is included on Warwick's DVD 'The Diva Of Soul Music Live In Concert'.
- Billy Vaughn covered the track on his 1976 album Melodies of Love.
- The punk band the Feederz covered the song on their 1984 debut album "Ever Feel Like Killing Your Boss?". The Nip Drivers was another punk band that covered it.
- In 1986, Japanese singer Megumi Shiina covered the song in Japanese under the title "Ai Wa Nemura Nai" (Love Never Sleeps), which was the theme song of the TV drama "Who Wears the Bridal Gown?"
- The Dutch band Party Animals sampled the song in 1996 on their happy hardcore hit "Have You Ever Been Mellow". The song reached number one in the Netherlands.
- In 2001, Japanese singer and voice actress Rie Tanaka recorded the song (in English) for her album Garnet. Olivia's original version had been a big hit in Japan in 1975.
- Australian singer James Reyne covered the song (titled simply, "Mellow") on his 2004 release Speedboats for Breakfast. His version is a raucous, punk-influenced take on the song. (Reyne and Newton-John shared the same management in the late '80s and early '90s, and Newton-John sang backing vocals on Reyne's solo debut album.)
- In 2006, German DJ duo Tune Up! (DJ Manian and Yanou) released a Hands Up song entitled "Have U Ever Been Mellow" that sampled the song's lyrics. This was later re-released on their 2010 album Ravers Fantasy.
- The song was performed as part of the 2007 Broadway musical Xanadu.
- Australian singer Tex Perkins covered the track on his 2008 album No. 1's & No. 2's.
- Belgian liquid drum & bass prodigy Netsky sampled the song on his 2010 debut album Netsky (Hospital Records), using the vocals of Terri Pace on the song "Mellow".
- Me First and the Gimme Gimmes covered the song on their all Australian covers 2011 EP, Go Down Under.
- In 2016, Dutch DJ duo Showtek released a Hardstyle song entitled "Mellow" that sampled this song's lyrics with Technoboy and Tuneboy.
- In 2017, Japanese singer-songwriter Rina Sumioka covered the song on her album Colors.
- Juliana Hatfield covered the song on her 2018 album Juliana Hatfield Sings Olivia Newton-John.
- A remixed version by The Olivia Project appears in the Dance Dance Revolution series of video games.
