= Rainy Wednesday Records =

Rainy Wednesday Records was a record label created by novelty artist Dickie Goodman in 1973.

== Creation ==
"Energy Crisis '74" was a Top 40 hit in 1974

In his long career an artist and producer, Goodman released records under a slew of label names, including Luniverse (as Buchanan and Goodman in the late 50s), Rori, Mark-X, 20th Century and Cotique. In 1973, Goodman met the label's co-founder on a rainy Wednesday in New York, providing its name. Goodman started the label number at 201, the area code of his New Jersey residence at the time.

All but one of Rainy Wednesday's releases were in Goodman's standard "break-in" style, in which an interviewer asks a question, only to have it "answered" with a snippet of a current hit record. (The only non-"break in" recording released was a straight cover of Sheb Wooley's "The Purple People Eater", a #1 hit from 1958.) Goodman himself and John & Ernest (a black duo whose records consisted of soul-oriented snippets and the original funk tune "Crossover" on one the flip sides) were the only two artists to appear on Rainy Wednesday.

== Discography ==
Artist	Title	B-side	Number	Year	Remarks
John & Ernest	Super Fly Meets Shaft	Part Two	RW-201	1973	peaked at #31 on Billboard chart
Dickie Goodman	Watergrate	Friends	RW-202	1973	peaked at #42 on Billboard chart
John & Ernest	Soul President Number One	Crossover	RW-203	1973	did not chart
Dickie Goodman	The Purple People Eater	Ruthie's Theme	RW-204	1973	cover of Sheb Wooley song; peaked at #119
Dickie Goodman	The Constitution	The End	RW-205	1973	did not chart
Dickie Goodman	Energy Crisis '74	The Mistake	RW-206	1974	joke B-side (see article); peaked at #33
Dickie Goodman	Energy Crisis '74	Ruthie's Theme	RW-206	1974	re-release with correct B-side
Dickie Goodman	Mr. President	Popularity	RW-207	1974	not be confused with 1981 recording of the same name; peaked at #73
Dickie Goodman	Gerry Ford (A Special Report)	Robert's Tune	RW-208	1974	did not chart
Dickie Goodman	Inflation In The Nation	Jon and Jed's Theme	RW-209	1975	did not chart

== Later career ==
Dickie Goodman folded Rainy Wednesday Records in 1975, but continued to release music under several other label names, including Cash ("Mr. Jaws", a Top 5 hit in 1975), Shark, Wacko and Rhino Records. Goodman's last recording, "Safe Sex Report", was released on the Goodname label in 1987; he died in 1989.
