= Petty Enterprises =

American auto racing organization

Lee Petty Engineering Petty Enterprises
- Owner(s): Lee Petty; Richard Petty; Kyle Petty; Boston Ventures
- Base: Level Cross, North Carolina
- Series: NASCAR Sprint Cup Series; NASCAR Nationwide Series; NASCAR Craftsman Truck Series
- Manufacturer: Ford, Dodge, Chrysler, Plymouth, Oldsmobile, Buick, Pontiac, Chevrolet
- Opened: 1949
- Closed: 2008

Career
- Drivers' Championships: 10 (1954, 1958, 1959, 1964, 1967, 1971, 1972, 1974, 1975, 1979)
- Race victories: 279; Sprint Cup: 268; Truck Series: 2 Convertible Division: 3 Winston West: 3 ARCA Racing Series: 3

Petty Enterprises (formerly Lee Petty Engineering) was a NASCAR racing team based in Level Cross, North Carolina. It was founded by Lee Petty with his two sons Richard Petty and Maurice Petty. The team was later owned by Richard Petty, his son Kyle Petty and Boston Ventures. At the time of its folding the team operated the No. 43 and No. 45 Dodge Chargers in the NASCAR Sprint Cup Series. Petty Enterprises ran from 1949 until 2008. The team closed shop in January 2009 and merged with Gillett Evernham Motorsports after sponsorship could not be found for any of the cars in the Petty stable; the merged team took the name Richard Petty Motorsports, adopting a logo similar to that of Petty Enterprises' logo. In 2021, Richard Petty Motorsports became Petty GMS Motorsports, and in 2023 the team rebranded as Legacy Motor Club.

Petty Enterprises formerly held the title of winningest team in NASCAR Cup Series for 61 years, beginning in 1960 with a win by Lee Petty. At the time of the team's final victory, it totaled 268 wins in the series. In 2021, Hendrick Motorsports eclipsed the record, winning its 269th race in the Coca-Cola 600 with Kyle Larson.

== Old race shop in Level Cross ==
The facilities in Randleman that was vacated by the race team is still owned by the Petty family and is now (since 2010) a small business called The Petty Garage and specializes in custom cars, vintage restorations, and other specialty automotive work. The last few years has seen it host Mopar (Chrysler Co. vehicles) appreciation meets.

== Cup Series ==
=== Car No. 42 history ===
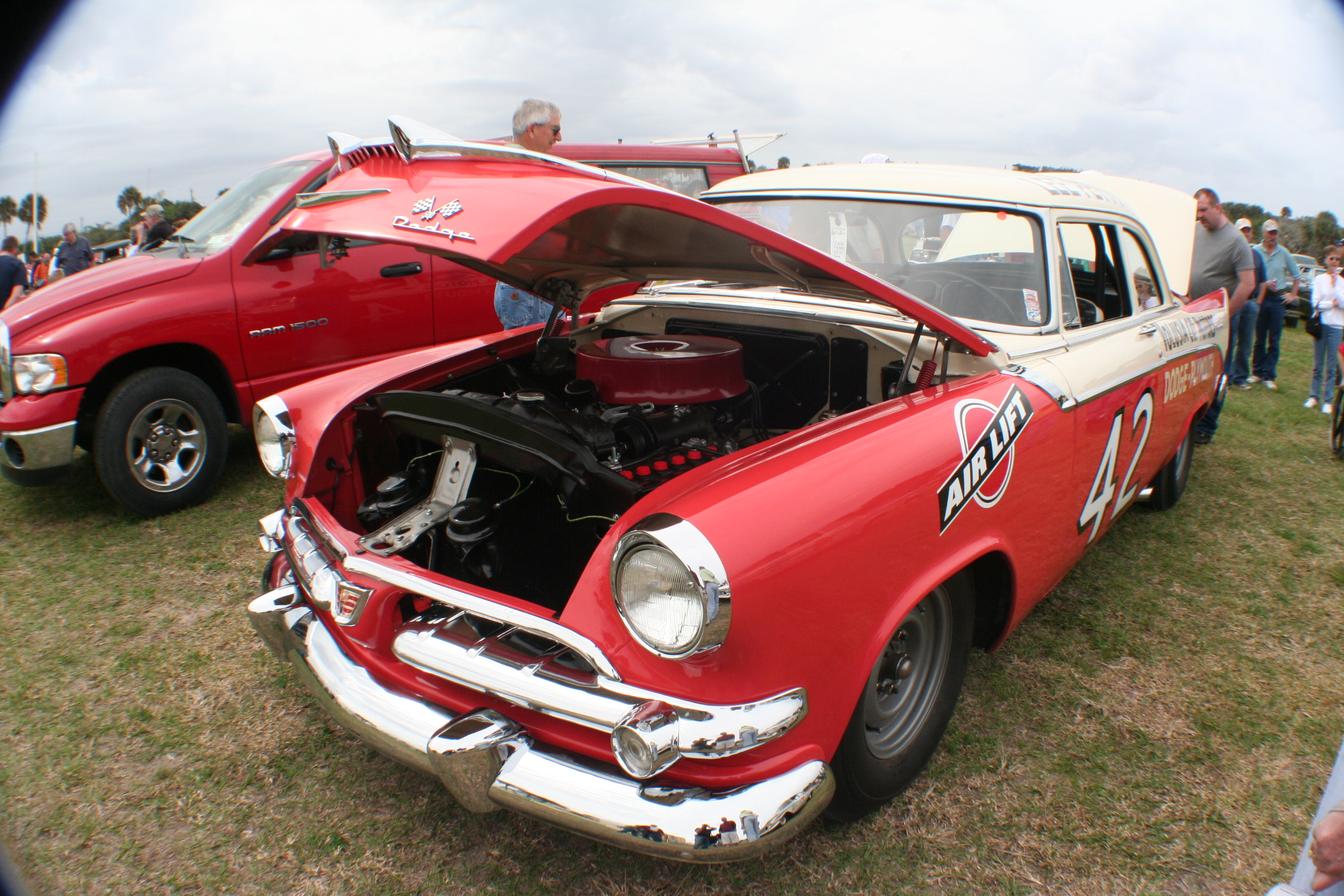
Lee Petty's 1956 Dodge Coronet

==== Lee Petty (1949-1961) ====
Founded as Lee Petty Engineering, Lee Petty brought Petty Enterprises their first starts, the first of these at Occoneechee Speedway, where Petty finished ninth. The team's first win came that year in Lee's fifth start at Heidelberg Raceway, with Petty and the team finishing 2nd in points that season. Petty won one race in each of the years 1950 and 1951, before collecting three victories in 1952. Lee grabbed five wins in 1953 and finished second in points before winning the championship in 1954. He followed that with six wins the next season and two more the following year, making him one of the most dominating drivers in the series at that time. In 1957, Petty won four races as the team began running additional teams. Petty would accumulate a total of 54 career wins, one of them being the inaugural Daytona 500 in 1959, and three national championships. But during the 100 Mile Qualifying Races for the 1961 Daytona 500, Petty was involved in a horrific crash with Johnny Beauchamp, this would hospitalize both drivers, and Petty would only make a handful of starts between 1962 and 1964.

Lee's sons, Richard and Maurice Petty, would also make a few starts in their father's cars in the early part of their careers. Several other drivers raced a handful of times in the No. 42, including Marvin Panch, Paul Lewis, Tiny Lund, G.C. Spencer, and Dan Gurney.

==== Kyle Petty (1979-1984) ====
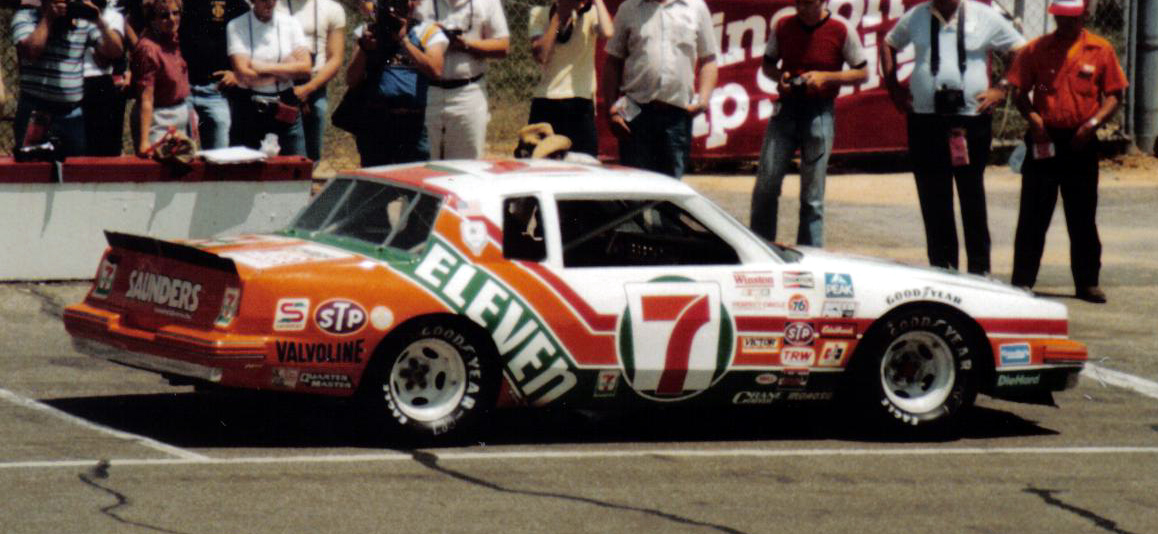
Kyle Petty's 1983 Pontiac Grand Prix

The year of 1979 saw Richard's son, Kyle Petty, start his career winning the very first race he entered - the Arca 200 at Daytona International Speedway, Petty drove five cup races for PE in 1979.

In 1983, the No. 42 became the #7 due to Kyle Petty's 7-Eleven-sponsorship. Kyle earned eight Top 5's, but no wins during that stretch. Petty left to drive for the Wood Brothers in 1985, taking the sponsor with him and causing the team to shut down.

==== Car No. 42 results ====
Year	Driver	No.	Make	1	2	3	4	5	6	7	8	9	10	11	12	13	14	15	16	17	18	19	20	21	22	23	24	25	26	27	28	29	30	31	Owners	Pts
1979	Kyle Petty	42	Dodge	RSD	DAY	CAR	RCH	ATL	NWS	BRI	DAR	MAR	TAL	NSV	DOV	CLT	TWS	RSD	MCH	DAY	NSV	POC	TAL; 9	MCH; 13	BRI	DAR	RCH	DOV	MAR	CLT; 18	NWS	CAR	ATL; 32		37th	559
1979	Kyle Petty	42	Chevy																															ONT; 14	37th	559
1980	Kyle Petty	42	Dodge	RSD	DAY; DNQ	RCH																													28th	1690
1980	Kyle Petty	42	Chevy				CAR; 31	ATL; 14	BRI	DAR	NWS; 8	MAR; 15	TAL	NSV	DOV; 21	CLT; 7	TWS	RSD	MCH; 7	DAY	NSV	POC; 7	TAL; 9	MCH; 12	BRI	DAR	RCH	DOV	NWS		CLT; 9	CAR; 35	ATL	ONT; 35	28th	1690
1980	Kyle Petty	42	Olds																											MAR; 27					28th	1690
1981	Richard Petty	42	Chevy	RSD; 5																															12th	3335
1981	Kyle Petty	42	Buick		DAY; 32	RCH; 24	CAR; 8	ATL; 41	BRI; 11	NWS; 22	DAR; 25	MAR; 15	TAL; 30	NSV; 7	DOV; 20	CLT; 5	TWS; 29	RSD; 6	MCH; 21	DAY; 6	NSV; 6	POC; 8	TAL; 7	MCH; 19	BRI; 28	DAR; 24	RCH; 22	DOV; 7	MAR; 19	NWS; 18	CLT; 20	CAR; 37	ATL; 8	RSD; 37	12th	3335
1982	Kyle Petty	42	Pontiac	DAY; 23	RCH; 20	BRI; 11	ATL; 26	CAR; 27	DAR; 18	NWS; 14	MAR; 27	TAL; 4	NSV; 27	DOV; 29	CLT; 17	POC; 11	RSD; 12	MCH; 6	DAY	NSV; 23	POC	TAL	MCH	BRI; 30	DAR	RCH; 14	DOV; 2	NWS; 10	CLT	MAR; 21	CAR; 29	ATL; 31	RSD		15th	3024
1983	Kyle Petty	7	Pontiac	DAY; 33	RCH; 14	CAR; 15	ATL; 35	DAR; 31	NWS; 30	MAR; 11	TAL; 30	NSV; 17	DOV; 11	BRI; 11	CLT; 8	RSD; 6	POC; 13	MCH; 16	DAY; 30	NSV; 20	POC; 11	TAL; 11	MCH; 14	BRI; 11	DAR; 35	RCH; 12	DOV; 26	MAR; 12	NWS; 16	CLT; 18	CAR; 24	ATL; 20	RSD; 13		13th	3261
1984	Kyle Petty	7	Ford	DAY; 40	RCH; 17	CAR; 31	ATL; 38	BRI; 26	NWS; 5	DAR; 24	MAR; 8	TAL; 15	NSV; 11	DOV; 13	CLT; 37	RSD; 8	POC; 12	MCH; 12	DAY; 30	NSV; 15	POC; 8	TAL; 22	MCH; 17	BRI; 24	DAR; 32	RCH; 6	DOV; 14	MAR; 10	CLT; 17	NWS; 20	CAR; 24	ATL; 22	RSD; 28		16th	3159

=== Car No. 43 history ===
==== Pre-Richard Petty years (1954-1958) ====
Believed to be one of the most recognizable numbers in motorsports, the No. 43 team debuted in 1954, when Lee Petty expanded to a two car team and put Bob Welborn in the driver's seat. Welborn competed in two races that season; West Palm Beach and Savannah, finishing 11th and 20th, respectively. The #43 would not return with Petty Enterprises until 1957, this time with Bill Lutz behind the wheel. Lutz drove his Oldsmobile to a 6th-place finish at Daytona Beach. The 43 car would once again take a break from competition until 1959, when Lee placed his son Richard in the car.

==== Richard Petty (1959-1992) ====
Richard made ten starts in 1959, accumulating five top tens, and four top fives making him the 1959 Rookie of the Year. Petty returned in 1960, making forty starts, with three wins, sixteen top fives, and thirty top tens. He finished second in NASCAR Grand National Series points, scoring his first career win at Charlotte Fairgrounds Speedway. Petty scored ten wins throughout 1961 and 1962, finishing eighth and second in championship standings. Although he had tremendous success early in his career, his true breakout year was 1963. In '63, Petty scored fourteen wins, thirty top fives, thirty-nine top tens, and eight poles. However, he still fell short of the championship, finishing second to Joe Weatherly.

1964 saw Richard win his first Grand National title, and first Daytona 500. Joining in the Chrysler boycott of NASCAR due to the ban of the Hemi engine, Petty spent most of 1965 drag racing, and only made fourteen out of fifty-five races on the circuit. In 1966, Petty returned to NASCAR. Winning yet another Daytona 500, and finishing third in points. 1967 was a monumental year for Richard. He compiled twenty-seven wins out of forty-eight starts, including a record ten wins in a row. One of these victories was the Southern 500 at Darlington Raceway. This would be his only win in the Southern 500. His dominance in this season dubbed him the nickname of, "King Richard." He had previously been known as the "Randleman Rocket." He also scored his second Grand National Series championship during that season. Petty continued this success in 1968, although he finished third in final points ranking. In 1969, Petty switched brands to Ford, as Richard believed his Plymouth was not as competitive on superspeedways. He requested to run a Dodge Daytona, but Chrysler executives insisted he stay with Plymouth. He would take home ten race wins, and finish second in points. In 1970 Plymouth developed their own version of the Dodge Daytona, the Plymouth Superbird. It had the features Richard wanted, and he switched back to Plymouth for the 1970 season. 1971 was a year of "threes" for Petty, he won his third Daytona 500 and third championship, edging over Virginia driver, James Hylton. Richard would win twenty-one races that year, making him the first stock car racing driver in history to win over $1,000,000. At the end of the 1971 season, Chrysler announced they would no longer factory-back the Pettys.

In 1972, STP began a long, very successful sponsorship arrangement with the team. However, it put an end to the years of famous all "Petty Blue" cars. Initially, STP insisted the car be all orangish-red. But after a lengthy negotiation session, they decided on a car that would be a combination of the "Petty Blue" and the "STP Red." This paint scheme would become the one of all STP sponsored race car, most notably Gordon Johncock's 1982 Indianapolis 500 winning automobile. Thanks to his eight victories, twenty-five top fives, and twenty-eight top tens, Petty won his fourth series title, making him the inaugural Winston Cup champion. In 1973, Petty completed his first full-time season in a Dodge Charger (he had tested them in 1972.) 1973 also saw Petty's fourth Daytona 500 victory, outlasting Buddy Baker's K&K Insurance Racing Dodge. A year later, all NASCAR races were shortened due to the energy crisis. Petty would win the "Daytona 450," along with nine other races, winning his fifth championship.

1975 was another historic year for Petty, as he won the World 600 in Charlotte for the first time in his career, en route to twelve more victories and his sixth series title. The thirteen wins is a modern era (1972–Present) record, tied by Jeff Gordon in 1998. In 1976, Petty was involved in one of the most famous finishes in NASCAR history. He and David Pearson were battling for the win on the last lap of the Daytona 500. When Petty tried to pass Pearson coming out of turn four, his right bumper and Pearson's left front bumper touched. Pearson and Petty both spun and hit the wall. Petty's car came to rest just yards before the start/finish line, but his engine had stalled. Pearson had struck the wall and clipped another car, but his engine was running. Although Team Petty tried to push-start Richard, Pearson would end up winning the race. 1978 was another big year for Petty, not because of his success, but because of his lack of success. This very well could've been the only year in Petty's prime where he did not visit the Winner's Circle. The team could not get their Dodge Magnum to handle the way they wanted, even though they spent countless hours trying to improve the car's performance.

Unhappy with his 1978 results, Petty decided to part ways with Chrysler, and began racing General Motors vehicles. This change proved very successful as Petty scored six top ten finishes in the last ten races of the season. He would go on to have even better results in 1979. He kicked off the season with winning the Daytona 500, the sixth of his career, and the first live flag-to-flag broadcast of a NASCAR race. This race became infamous for a fistfight between competitors Donnie Allison and Cale Yarborough after the race. Allison and Yarborough were running first and second on the last lap when they crashed, allowing Petty to sneak by. The race is also regarded as being the turning point of modern-day NASCAR. The East Coast was snowed in by a blizzard, giving CBS a captive audience. He ran most of the remaining races that season in a Chevrolet, winning four additional times, and his seventh and final NASCAR championship, beating Darrell Waltrip by eleven points. That would be the record for closest championship battle until 1992.

1980 was not a very good year for Petty; he only won twice. This is widely considered to be the first season of Richard's downfall. 1981 was slightly more promising. Prior to the 1981 season, NASCAR dictated that all teams had to downsize their cars to a 110" wheel-base. Even though Petty had been successful with General Motors cars, he wanted to return to his Mopar roots. So, in 1981 Petty revealed a brand new 1981 Dodge Mirada and took it to Daytona in January for testing. Petty's fans were also mostly Dodge fans, so when word got out about the Mirada, over 15,000 people attended just to watch Petty test. Unfortunately for Richard, the Dodge's top speed averaged at 186 miles per hour, about 8 miles per hour slower than his fellow GM and Ford competitors. So, Petty abandoned the Dodge Mirada, and purchased a Buick Regal for the Daytona 500. Petty would end up winning the 500 for the seventh and last time thanks to a strategic late-race pit stop. While Petty would win three races in 1981, Petty was still disappointed in his results and concluded that the Regals were poor in reliability and ill-handling. For the 1982 season, he moved to the Pontiac Grand Prix. At first, the Grand Prix behaved much like the 1978 Dodge Magnum, but towards the end of the year things began to improve. Richard would end the season with three victories, nine top fives, and twenty-one top tens.

Richard would leave Petty Enterprises after the 1983 season, moving to Curb Racing in hopes his statistics would improve. In 1986 Richard returned to his family's team. The following years would come with little success for struggling Petty, scoring a combined zero wins, fifteen top fives, and thirty-two top tens.

On October 1, 1991, Petty announced he would retire from racing after the 1992 season. Petty's final top ten finish came in the 1991 Budweiser at the Glen, which is the same race that claimed the life of veteran driver JD McDuffie. Petty's final season was dubbed the "Fan Appreciation Tour." This tour took him around the country, participating in special events, ceremonies, and fan meeting sessions. Petty would lead the field on the pace lap at every race as a salute to the fans.

Petty led the first five laps of the Pepsi 400 at Daytona, but dropped out on lap 84. Petty's final race came at the season-ending Hooters 500 at Atlanta Motor Speedway. Petty was involved in an accident on lap 94, but the team managed to restore the car and send him back out with two laps to go and Richard Petty was running at the finish in 35th position before taking one last lap after the race in a fender-less race car, with tear-filled eyes and a hand out the window, waving goodbye to his many fans.

Legacy Motor Club and Daytona International Speedway unveiled the first of 28 unique statues featuring Petty's famed hat.

==== Rick Wilson (1993) ====
After Richard Petty's retirement, the No. 43 was renumbered as the No. 44 and Rick Wilson was signed to drive for 1993. Wilson struggled, only placing in the top 10 once at Sonoma, and was released at the end of the season.

==== Wally Dallenbach Jr. / John Andretti (1994) ====
In 1994, the team was renumbered back to the No. 43 with Wally Dallenbach Jr. as the driver. Dallenbach tallied three top 10's and one top 5, but struggled to qualify races. He was replaced mid-season by John Andretti.

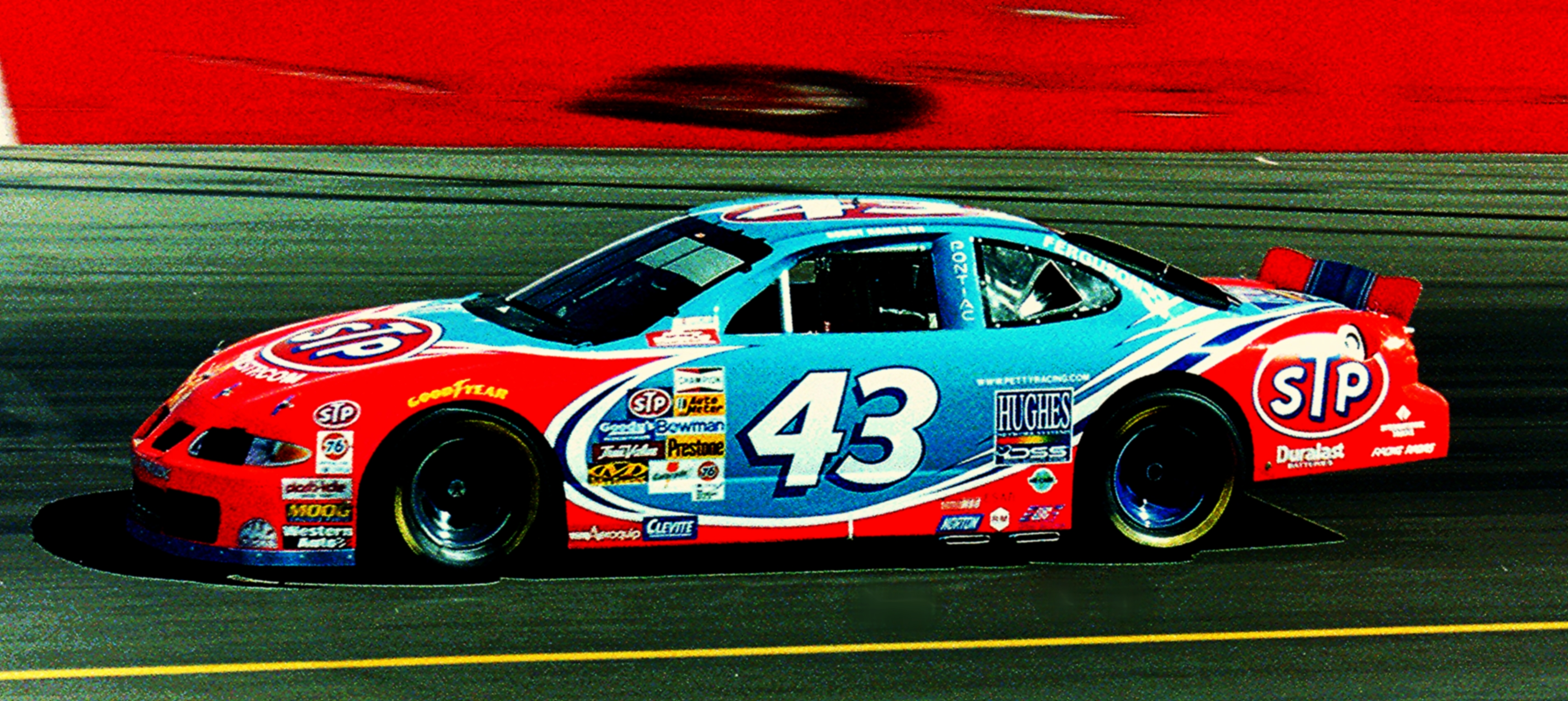
The No. 43 driven by Bobby Hamilton at Phoenix International Raceway in 1997.

==== Bobby Hamilton (1995-1997) ====
For 1995, 1991 Winston Cup Rookie of the Year Bobby Hamilton was hired to drive. Hamilton would score four top fives, and scored his first win with the team the following year at Phoenix, this would be Petty Enterprises first win since 1983. In 1997 Hamilton won at Rockingham, but left the team at the end of the season to drive for Morgan-McClure Racing.

==== John Andretti (1998-2003) ====
In 1998, journeyman John Andretti was hired and he gave the team three Top 5's in his first year, and another win at Martinsville the following. This would ultimately be the final win for Petty Enterprises. In 2000, Andretti began to fail and he only scored two Top 10's. The next year, he did score one Top 5 at Bristol.

The team lost longtime sponsor STP in mid-2000 and changed to General Mills. The #43 team began a noticeable downward slide, and would not win another race in Cup competition until 2014 as Richard Petty Motorsports.

==== Christian Fittipaldi (2003) and Jeff Green (2003-2005) ====
2003 saw Andretti get released fourteen races into the season in favor of Brazilian driver Christian Fittipaldi, who struggled and was also released after ten races. Jeff Green took over for 2004–2005, with a best finish of seventh at Martinsville in 2004.

==== Bobby Labonte (2006-2008) ====
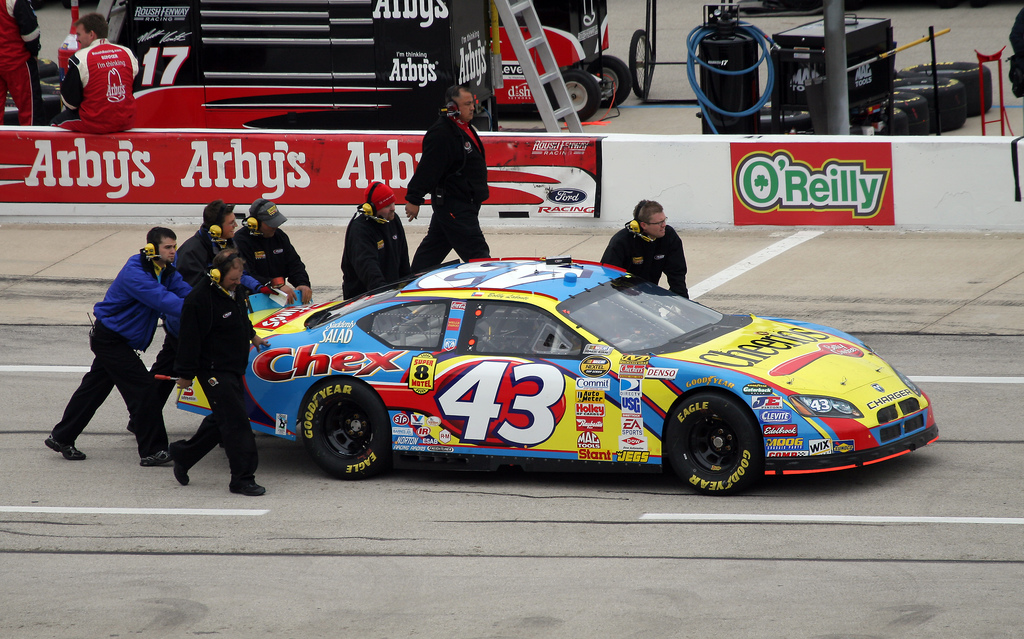
Bobby Labonte's 2007 Dodge Charger at Texas Motor Speedway

In 2006, the team brought in 2000 Winston Cup champion Bobby Labonte and former Hendrick Motorsports crew chief Robbie Loomis. Many analysts saw this combination as the key to putting Petty Enterprises back into victory lane. The team's first year together showed promise, Labonte finished 21st in the points with eight top tens. Late in the 2007 season, Petty Enterprises moved its shop into the old Robert Yates Racing facility in Mooresville, North Carolina. It would be the first time since the inception of the company that it wouldn't be located in Randleman, North Carolina. "PE believes that this is necessary to move forward with the team," Richard Petty said. "It's kind of hard for us and the people in the community to accept maybe we're not there anymore. We just feel for us to move forward and keep up with where NASCAR is going, we just felt we had to try to go somewhere else." That year, Labonte improved to 18th in points. Labonte fell back to 21st in points in 2008, posting just two top-10 finishes Earlier in the year, General Mills announced they would leave the team to sponsor Richard Childress Racing's fourth cup car in 2009. Rumors surfaced in early December 2008 that Petty Enterprises may cease operations and liquidate its assets, since Boston Ventures was unable to secure sponsorship for the No. 43.

==== Merger with Evernham Motorsports (2009) ====
In January 2009, Petty Enterprises merged with Gillett Evernham Motorsports and the No. 43 car was absorbed into the team. Labonte left the team before the 2009 season, leaving the car with no driver and no sponsor for 2009. By January 2009, the only employees left were Robbie Loomis and Richard Petty himself. CEO David F. Zucker was reassigned to the Richard Petty Driving Experience, which Boston Ventures also controlled.

The team's merger with Gillett Evernham Motorsports moved the No. 43 over to that team, In 2021, RPM merged with GMS Racing and the No. 43 moved there where it is currently driven by Erik Jones.

==== Car No. 43 results ====
Year	Driver	No.	Make	1	2	3	4	5	6	7	8	9	10	11	12	13	14	15	16	17	18	19	20	21	22	23	24	25	26	27	28	29	30	31	32	33	34	35	36	Owners	Pts
1972	Richard Petty	43	Plymouth	RSD; 1	DAY; 26	RCH; 1	ONT; 4	CAR; 2	ATL; 6	BRI; 3	DAR; 2	NWS; 1	MAR; 1					RSD; 23*			BRI; 2	TRN; 3				NSV; 2		RCH; 1*	DOV; 2	MAR; 1	NWS; 1		CAR; 2							1st	8701.4
1972	Richard Petty	43	Dodge											TAL; 5	CLT; 19	DOV; 2	MCH; 3		TWS; 1*	DAY; 2			ATL; 2	TAL; 7	MCH; 4		DAR; 3					CLT; 10		TWS; 3						1st	8701.4
1973	Richard Petty	43	Dodge	RSD; 21	DAY; 1	RCH; 1*	CAR; 23	BRI; 2	ATL; 34	NWS; 1*	DAR; 7	MAR; 21	TAL; 35	NSV; 13	CLT; 13	DOV; 4	TWS; 1	RSD; 2	MCH; 3	DAY; 2	BRI; 21	ATL; 33	TAL; 14	NSV; 2	DAR; 4	RCH; 1*	DOV; 7	NWS; 2*	MAR; 1	CLT; 2	CAR; 35									5th	6877.95
1974	Richard Petty	43	Dodge	RSD; 2	DAY; 1	RCH; 2	CAR; 1*	BRI; 23	ATL; 6	DAR; 20	NWS; 1*	MAR; 2	TAL; 3	NSV; 1	DOV; 3	CLT; 2	RSD; 25	MCH; 1*	DAY; 2	BRI; 3	NSV; 13*	ATL; 1	POC; 1*	TAL; 1	MCH; 2	DAR; 35	RCH; 1*	DOV; 1*	NWS; 2	MAR; 29	CLT; 2	CAR; 3	ONT; 15*							1st	5037.75
1975	Richard Petty	43	Dodge	RSD; 7	DAY; 7	RCH; 1*	CAR; 3	BRI; 1*	ATL; 1*	NWS; 1*	DAR; 26	MAR; 1*	TAL; 19	NSV; 7	DOV; 3	CLT; 1*	RSD; 1	MCH; 2	DAY; 1	NSV; 2	POC; 2	TAL; 2	MCH; 1	DAR; 2*	DOV; 1*	NWS; 1*	MAR; 22	CLT; 1*	RCH; 28	CAR; 35	BRI; 1*	ATL; 3	ONT; 16							1st	4783
1976	Richard Petty	43	Dodge	RSD; 25	DAY; 2	CAR; 1*	RCH; 2	BRI; 27	ATL; 28	NWS; 2	DAR; 23	MAR; 4	TAL; 4	NSV; 2	DOV; 6	CLT; 2	RSD; 9	MCH; 4	DAY; 22	NSV; 2	POC; 1	TAL; 20	MCH; 3	BRI; 2	DAR; 2	RCH; 3	DOV; 2	MAR; 4	NWS; 3	CLT; 8	CAR; 1*	ATL; 28	ONT; 27							2nd	4449
1977	Richard Petty	43	Dodge	RSD; 3	DAY; 26	RCH; 6	CAR; 1*	ATL; 1	NWS; 2	DAR; 3	BRI; 3	MAR; 3	TAL; 20	NSV; 5	DOV; 3	CLT; 1*	RSD; 1*	MCH; 2	DAY; 1*	NSV; 3	POC; 2	TAL; 11	MCH; 8	BRI; 22	DAR; 4	RCH; 2	DOV; 23	MAR; 4	NWS; 24*	CLT; 32	CAR; 2	ATL; 6	ONT; 2							2nd	4614
1978	Richard Petty	43	Dodge	RSD; 16	DAY; 33	RCH; 22	CAR; 4	ATL; 26	BRI; 25	DAR; 5	NWS; 2	MAR; 3	TAL; 11	DOV; 7	CLT; 8	NSV; 3	RSD; 2	MCH; 6	DAY; 4	NSV; 23	POC; 30	TAL; 7																		6th	3949
1978	Richard Petty	43	Chevy																				MCH; 14	BRI; 5	DAR; 3	RCH; 20	DOV; 27	MAR; 6	NWS; 4	CLT; 27	CAR; 6	ATL; 2	ONT; 34							6th	3949
1979	Richard Petty	43	Chevy	RSD; 32		CAR; 32	RCH; 5		NWS; 2*		DAR; 2	MAR; 1*		NSV; 2*		CLT; 2	TWS; 6	RSD; 3	MCH; 5		NSV; 5	POC; 2		MCH; 1	BRI; 2	DAR; 9	RCH; 6	DOV; 1	MAR; 2	CLT; 4	NWS; 3	CAR; 1	ATL; 6	ONT; 5						1st	4830
1979	Richard Petty	43	Olds		DAY; 1			ATL; 11		BRI; 4			TAL; 4		DOV; 30					DAY; 5			TAL; 4																	1st	4830
1980	Richard Petty	43	Chevy	RSD; 3		RCH; 3	CAR; 2	ATL; 33	BRI; 8	DAR; 9	NWS; 1*	MAR; 3		NSV; 1	DOV; 2	CLT; 4	TWS; 2	RSD; 8	MCH; 5		NSV; 5	POC; 33		MCH; 5	BRI; 4	DAR; 9	RCH; 2	DOV; 17	NWS; 18	MAR; 15	CLT; 27	CAR; 14	ATL; 21	ONT; 30						4th	4255
1980	Richard Petty	43	Olds		DAY; 25								TAL; 31							DAY; 5			TAL; 18																	4th	4255
1981	Kyle Petty	43	Chevy	RSD; 20																																				8th	3880
1981	Richard Petty	43	Buick		DAY; 1	RCH; 3	CAR; 3	ATL; 38	BRI; 29	NWS; 1	DAR; 33	MAR; 28	TAL; 39	NSV; 4	DOV; 19	CLT; 24	TWS; 4	RSD; 3	MCH; 6	DAY; 3	NSV; 9	POC; 2	TAL; 40	MCH; 1*	BRI; 24	DAR; 30	RCH; 11	DOV; 10	MAR; 18	NWS; 21	CLT; 30	CAR; 4	ATL; 26	RSD; 7						8th	3880
1982	Richard Petty	43	Pontiac	DAY; 27	RCH; 2	BRI; 7	ATL; 2	CAR; 30	DAR; 31	NWS; 5	MAR; 15	TAL; 27	NSV; 9	DOV; 24	CLT; 8	POC; 7	RSD; 36	MCH; 26	DAY; 25	NSV; 7	POC; 2*	TAL; 3	MCH; 2	BRI; 26	DAR; 2	RCH; 13	DOV; 30	NWS; 4	CLT; 8	MAR; 3	CAR; 6	ATL; 15	RSD; 31							5th	3814
1983	Richard Petty	43	Pontiac	DAY; 38	RCH; 8	CAR; 1	ATL; 5	DAR; 25	NWS; 10	MAR; 17	TAL; 1*	NSV; 6	DOV; 7	BRI; 5	CLT; 2	RSD; 10	POC; 3	MCH; 11	DAY; 33	NSV; 19	POC; 10	TAL; 4	MCH; 6	BRI; 9	DAR; 12	RCH; 6	DOV; 9	MAR; 9	NWS; 12	CLT; 1	CAR; 26	ATL; 5	RSD; 10							4th	4042
1986	Richard Petty	43	Pontiac	DAY; 36	RCH; 20	CAR; 3	ATL; 11	BRI; 14	DAR; 7	NWS; 29	MAR; 28	TAL; 7	DOV; 6	CLT; Wth^{†}	RSD; 6	POC; 19	MCH; 13	DAY; 22	POC; 34	TAL; 37	GLN; 10	MCH; 18	BRI; 7	DAR; 40	RCH; 4	DOV; 12	MAR; 16	NWS; 3	CLT; 35	CAR; 8	ATL; 2	RSD; 21								14th	3314
1987	Richard Petty	43	Pontiac	DAY; 3	CAR; 15	RCH; 23	ATL; 14	DAR; 3	NWS; 6	BRI; 2	MAR; 22	TAL; 16	CLT; 4	DOV; 36	POC; 29	RSD; 6	MCH; 12	DAY; 26	POC; 8	TAL; 37	GLN; 14	MCH; 11	BRI; 5	DAR; 3	RCH; 5	DOV; 9	MAR; 13	NWS; 9	CLT; 5	CAR; 17	RSD; 4	ATL; 30								8th	3708
1988	Richard Petty	43	Pontiac	DAY; 34	RCH; 3	CAR; 41	ATL; 23	DAR; 41	BRI; 6	NWS; 6	MAR; 32	TAL; 20	CLT; 15	DOV; 15	RSD; 6	POC; 26	MCH; 24	DAY; 20	POC; 28	TAL; 21	GLN; 17	MCH; 39	BRI; 8	DAR; 33	RCH; 34	DOV; 38	MAR; 27	CLT; 38	NWS; 18	CAR; 25	PHO; 35	ATL; 36								22nd	2644
1989	Richard Petty	43	Pontiac	DAY; 17	CAR; 16	ATL; 27	RCH; DNQ	DAR; 15	BRI; DNQ	NWS; DNQ	MAR; 24	TAL; 23	CLT; 19	DOV; 20	SON; 26	POC; 25	MCH; 30	DAY; 20	POC; 38	TAL; 21	GLN; 13	MCH; 18	BRI; DNQ	DAR; 35	RCH; 33	DOV; 30	MAR; 24	CLT; 34	NWS; 32	CAR; 34	PHO; 42	ATL; 28								29th	2148
1990	Richard Petty	43	Pontiac	DAY; 34	RCH; 35	CAR; 32	ATL; 25	DAR; 21	BRI; 26	NWS; 29	MAR; 20	TAL; 29	CLT; 27	DOV; 21	SON; 26	POC; 38	MCH; 11	DAY; 36	POC; 9	TAL; 29	GLN; 18	MCH; 33	BRI; 29	DAR; 34	RCH; 21	DOV; 16	MAR; 29	NWS; 17	CLT; 20	CAR; 21	PHO; 23	ATL; 17								26th	2556
1991	Richard Petty	43	Pontiac	DAY; 19	RCH; 11	CAR; 15	ATL; 38	DAR; 37	BRI; 17	NWS; 16	MAR; 14	TAL; 40	CLT; 20	DOV; 17	SON; 34	POC; 11	MCH; 35	DAY; 22	POC; 31	TAL; 18	GLN; 9	MCH; 23	BRI; 12	DAR; 16	RCH; 24	DOV; 20	MAR; 30	NWS; 19	CLT; 12	CAR; 16	PHO; 41	ATL; 22								24th	2817
1992	Richard Petty	43	Pontiac	DAY; 16	CAR; 16	RCH; 21	ATL; 16	DAR; 32	BRI; 27	NWS; 31	MAR; 29	TAL; 15	CLT; 41	DOV; 20	SON; 21	POC; 16	MCH; 15	DAY; 36	POC; 20	TAL; 15	GLN; 28	MCH; 18	BRI; 16	DAR; 20	RCH; 16	DOV; 28	MAR; 18	NWS; 27	CLT; 27	CAR; 25	PHO; 22	ATL; 35								26th	2731
1993	Rick Wilson	44	Pontiac	DAY; 34	CAR; 17	RCH; 25	ATL; 24	DAR; 26	BRI; 25	NWS; 23	MAR; 17	TAL; 16	SON; 8	CLT; 32	DOV; 11	POC; 12	MCH; 34	DAY; 11	NHA; 28	POC; 21	TAL; 23	GLN; 22	MCH; 28	BRI; 28	DAR; 30	RCH; 29	DOV; 34		NWS; 33	CLT; 36	CAR; 26	PHO; 20	ATL; 23							28th	2647
1993	Jimmy Hensley	44	Pontiac																									MAR; 34												28th	2647
1994	Wally Dallenbach Jr.	43	Pontiac	DAY; 17	CAR; 27	RCH; DNQ	ATL; DNQ	DAR; 41	BRI; 17	NWS; 16	MAR; DNQ	TAL; 41	SON; 4	CLT; 25	DOV; 10	POC; 17	MCH; DNQ	DAY; DNQ	NHA; DNQ	POC; 16	TAL; 8	IND; 23	GLN; 14																	32nd	2575
1994	John Andretti	43	Pontiac																					MCH; 17	BRI; 30	DAR; 16	RCH; 11	DOV; 25	MAR; 21	NWS; 17	CLT; 24	CAR; 25	PHO; 43	ATL; 13						32nd	2575
1995	Bobby Hamilton	43	Pontiac	DAY; 18	CAR; 36	RCH; 9	ATL; 17	DAR; 9	BRI; 4	NWS; 13	MAR; 8	TAL; 15	SON; 14	CLT; 9	DOV; 24	POC; 15	MCH; 25	DAY; 40	NHA; 16	POC; 19	TAL; 21	IND; 11	GLN; 33	MCH; 8	BRI; 20	DAR; 14	RCH; 5	DOV; 2	MAR; 4	NWS; 16	CLT; 10	CAR; 30	PHO; 31	ATL; 25						14th	3576
1996	Bobby Hamilton	43	Pontiac	DAY; 20	CAR; 24	RCH; 6*	ATL; 16	DAR; 16	BRI; 32	NWS; 8	MAR; 6	TAL; 11	SON; 17	CLT; 31	DOV; 21	POC; 5	MCH; 15	DAY; 16	NHA; 20	POC; 39	TAL; 17	IND; 31	GLN; 38	MCH; 13	BRI; 10	DAR; 19	RCH; 7	DOV; 10	MAR; 3*	NWS; 8	CLT; 19	CAR; 28	PHO; 1	ATL; 6						9th	3639
1997	Bobby Hamilton	43	Pontiac	DAY; 15	CAR; 28	RCH; 5	ATL; 10	DAR; 37	TEX; 20	BRI; 13	MAR; 2	SON; 19	TAL; 31	CLT; 29	DOV; 17	POC; 39	MCH; 32	CAL; 23	DAY; 20	NHA; 31	POC; 32	IND; 20	GLN; 28	MCH; 26	BRI; 22	DAR; 20	RCH; 38	NHA; 3	DOV; 13	MAR; 3	CLT; 21	TAL; 20	CAR; 1	PHO; 3	ATL; 7					16th	3450
1998	John Andretti	43	Pontiac	DAY; 18	CAR; 13	LVS; 41	ATL; 20	DAR; 13	BRI; 19	TEX; 42	MAR; 18	TAL; 33	CAL; 31	CLT; 7	DOV; 12	RCH; 22	MCH; 20	POC; 13	SON; 3	NHA; 6	POC; 12	IND; 7	GLN; 8	MCH; 9	BRI; 38	NHA; 3	DAR; 14	RCH; 5	DOV; 9	MAR; 37	CLT; 12	TAL; 21	DAY; 14	PHO; 6	CAR; 34	ATL; 32				11th	3682
1999	John Andretti	43	Pontiac	DAY; 43	CAR; 19	LVS; 12	ATL; 28	DAR; 9	TEX; 38	BRI; 4	MAR; 1	TAL; 9	CAL; 17	RCH; 39	CLT; 19	DOV; 13	MCH; 8	POC; 28	SON; 3	DAY; 19	NHA; 18	POC; 42	IND; 37	GLN; 29	MCH; 10	BRI; 40	DAR; 18	RCH; 9	NHA; 41	DOV; 41	MAR; 43	CLT; 17	TAL; 32	CAR; 7	PHO; 8	HOM; 16	ATL; 33			17th	3394
2000	John Andretti	43	Pontiac	DAY; 22	CAR; 12	LVS; 25	ATL; 18	DAR; 20	BRI; 33	TEX; 32	MAR; 14	TAL; 11	CAL; 25	RCH; 18	CLT; 31	DOV; 13	MCH; 9	POC; 21	SON; 43	DAY; 14	NHA; 40	POC; 41	IND; 42	GLN; 37	MCH; 27	BRI; 20	DAR; 37	RCH; 11	NHA; 7	DOV; 22	MAR; 13	CLT; 18	TAL; 20	CAR; 23	PHO; 28	HOM; 37	ATL; 19			23rd	3169
2001	John Andretti	43	Dodge	DAY; 39	CAR; 21	LVS; 37	ATL; 14	DAR; 6	BRI; 2	TEX; 31	MAR; 35	TAL; 37	CAL; 26	RCH; 34	CLT; DNQ	DOV; 19	MCH; 37	POC; 39	SON; 30	DAY; 22	CHI; 23	NHA; 23	POC; 27	IND; 14	GLN; 14	MCH; 26	BRI; 21	DAR; 21	RCH; 30	DOV; 19	KAN; 39	CLT; 26	MAR; 33	TAL; 34	PHO; 39	CAR; 29	HOM; 22	ATL; 25	NHA; 36	31st	2943
2002	John Andretti	43	Dodge	DAY; 37	CAR; 15	LVS; 36	ATL; 36	DAR; 22	BRI; 34	TEX; 22	MAR; 42	TAL; 38	CAL; 24	RCH; 20	CLT; 15	DOV; 32	POC; 31	MCH; 23	SON; 10	DAY; 24	CHI; 22	NHA; 25	POC; 23	IND; 26	GLN; 11	MCH; 20	BRI; 19	DAR; 42	RCH; 29	NHA; 22	DOV; 29	KAN; 14	TAL; 18	CLT; 23	MAR; 13	ATL; 43	CAR; 18	PHO; 14	HOM; 39	28th	3161
2003	John Andretti	43	Dodge	DAY; 34	CAR; 39	LVS; 18	ATL; 29	DAR; 38	BRI; 31	TEX; 19	TAL; 14	MAR; 30	CAL; 8	RCH; 30	CLT; 39	DOV; 34	POC; 23																							41st	2911
2003	Christian Fittipaldi	43	Dodge															MCH; 35	SON; 40		CHI; 29	NHA; 37	POC; 24	IND; DNQ		MCH; 33	BRI; 41	DAR; 43	RCH; 43	NHA; 31										41st	2911
2003	Shane Hmiel	43	Dodge																	DAY; DNQ																				41st	2911
2003	Scott Maxwell	43	Dodge																						GLN; DNQ															41st	2911
2003	Jeff Green	43	Dodge																												DOV; 16	TAL; 18	KAN; 27	CLT; 27	MAR; 24	ATL; DNQ	PHO; 37	CAR; 19	HOM; 40	41st	2911
2004	Jeff Green	43	Dodge	DAY; 33	CAR; 28	LVS; 34	ATL; 19	DAR; 24	BRI; 29	TEX; 35	MAR; 24	TAL; 19	CAL; 37	RCH; 37	CLT; 27	DOV; 31	POC; 15	MCH; 27	SON; 27	DAY; 30	CHI; 28	NHA; 24	POC; 33	IND; 14	GLN; 17	MCH; 23	BRI; 29	CAL; 27	RCH; 25	NHA; 19	DOV; 21	TAL; 39	KAN; 29	CLT; 35	MAR; 7	ATL; 21	PHO; 23	DAR; 14	HOM; 37	30th	3054
2005	Jeff Green	43	Dodge	DAY; 16	CAL; 27	LVS; 23	ATL; 28	BRI; 29	MAR; 22	TEX; 43	PHO; 21	TAL; 25	DAR; 22	RCH; 24	CLT; 11	DOV; 30	POC; 15	MCH; 38	SON; 29	DAY; 34	CHI; 24	NHA; 31	POC; 19	IND; 15	GLN; 24	MCH; 24	BRI; 22	CAL; 25	RCH; 16	NHA; 17	DOV; 27	TAL; 21	KAN; 26	CLT; 19	MAR; 37	ATL; 29	TEX; 18	PHO; 28	HOM; 30	29th	3241
2006	Bobby Labonte	43	Dodge	DAY; 35	CAL; 31	LVS; 30	ATL; 43	BRI; 5	MAR; 32	TEX; 10	PHO; 8	TAL; 29	RCH; 24	DAR; 22	CLT; 17	DOV; 13	POC; 12	MCH; 28	SON; 35	DAY; 42	CHI; 12	NHA; 23	POC; 8	IND; 40	GLN; 24	MCH; 19	BRI; 23	CAL; 26	RCH; 22	NHA; 40	DOV; 7	KAN; 17	TAL; 10	CLT; 5	MAR; 3	ATL; 12	TEX; 16	PHO; 27	HOM; 41	21st	3567
2007	Bobby Labonte	43	Dodge	DAY; 21	CAL; 28	LVS; 13	ATL; 16	BRI; 22	MAR; 43	TEX; 28	PHO; 8	TAL; 20	RCH; 15	DAR; 19	CLT; 13	DOV; 18	POC; 19	MCH; 34	SON; 33	NHA; 18	DAY; 35	CHI; 20	IND; 19	POC; 30	GLN; 24	MCH; 9	BRI; 8	CAL; 11	RCH; 16	NHA; 22	DOV; 27	KAN; 42	TAL; 35	CLT; 12	MAR; 22	ATL; 41	TEX; 16	PHO; 18	HOM; 23	18th	3517
2008	Bobby Labonte	43	Dodge	DAY; 11	CAL; 25	LVS; 17	ATL; 12	BRI; 38	MAR; 25	TEX; 20	PHO; 12	TAL; 34	RCH; 13	DAR; 18	CLT; 11	DOV; 32	POC; 11	MCH; 31	SON; 39	NHA; 10	DAY; 13	CHI; 29	IND; 16	POC; 33	GLN; 42	MCH; 27	BRI; 23	CAL; 21	RCH; 21	NHA; 13	DOV; 14	KAN; 24	TAL; 6	CLT; 17	MAR; 37	ATL; 26	TEX; 39	PHO; 19	HOM; 33	21st	3448

=== Car No. 44 history ===
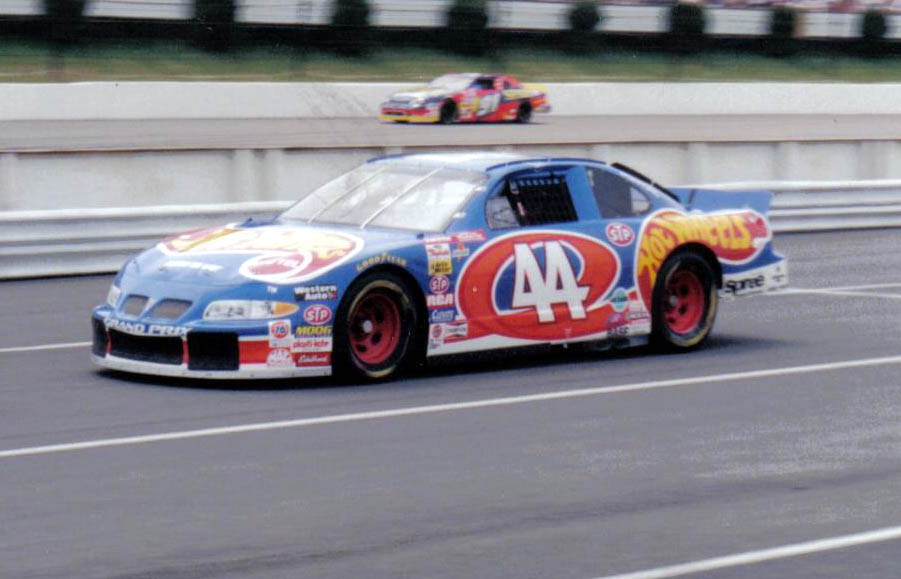
The 44 car at Pocono in 1997

==== Maurice Petty (1960-1961) ====
The No. 44 debuted in 1960 with driver Maurice Petty, Petty finished eighth. Maurice returned with the #44 in 1961, finishing twenty-first at Bowman Gray Stadium.

==== Kyle Petty (1997-2000) ====
The No. 44 returned when Kyle Petty formed his own PE2 Motorsports team for the 1997 season. After 1998 the team merged into Petty Enterprises and Kyle became the team's new CEO. Midway through 2000 after his son Adam Petty was killed while practicing for a Busch Series race at New Hampshire International Speedway, Kyle elected to finish out Adam's Busch season in his No. 45 and would switch to using the No. 45 in Cup from the 2001 season onwards. Steve Grissom would complete the season in the No. 44.

==== Buckshot Jones (2001-2002) ====
The No. 44 became a Dodge team in 2001 with a sponsorship from Georgia-Pacific and Buckshot Jones driving. In his first year driving the car, Jones finished 41st in points, failing to qualify six times and not recording a single Top 10 finish. Jones returned in 2002 but again struggled, and was released approximately mid-season. Petty Enterprises hired several substitute drivers including Jerry Nadeau, who nearly led the team to victory at Sonoma in June, and Greg Biffle, who ran the last three races.

After being used sparingly over the next season, recent Petty signee Christian Fittipaldi was to take over the car for 2004, but was released.

In 2009, Petty said the No. 44 would return with McCumbee, but McCumbee said "the plans are up in the air" due to lack of funding. With the recent merger with Gillett Evernham Motorsports, those plans were completely scrapped and McCumbee was without a ride for 2009. The No. 44 instead took the place for the No. 10 at Richard Petty Motorsports, with A. J. Allmendinger driving.

==== Car No. 44 results ====
Year	Driver	No.	Make	1	2	3	4	5	6	7	8	9	10	11	12	13	14	15	16	17	18	19	20	21	22	23	24	25	26	27	28	29	30	31	32	33	34	35	36	Owners	Pts
1997	Kyle Petty	44	Pontiac	DAY; 14	CAR; 29	RCH; 10	ATL; 13	DAR; 33	TEX; 27	BRI; 29	MAR; 40	SON; 13	TAL; 40	CLT; 14	DOV; 5	POC; 14	MCH; 26	CAL; 31	DAY; 7	NHA; 13	POC; 8	IND; 13	GLN; 26	MCH; 23	BRI; 36	DAR; 32	RCH; 20	NHA; 12	DOV; 3	MAR; 26	CLT; 9	TAL; 7	CAR; 22	PHO; 9	ATL; 6					15th	3455
1998	Kyle Petty	44	Pontiac	DAY; 11	CAR; 24	LVS; 22	ATL; 36	DAR; 29	BRI; 38	TEX; 17	MAR; 34	TAL; 38	CAL; 42	CLT; 30	DOV; 42	RCH; 24	MCH; 36	POC; 31	SON; 26	NHA; 8	POC; 21	IND; 14	GLN; 6	MCH; 29	BRI; 12	NHA; 33	DAR; 28	RCH; 39	DOV; 41	MAR; 29	CLT; 18	TAL; 20	DAY; 22	PHO; 36	CAR; 39	ATL; 29				30th	2675
1999	Kyle Petty	44	Pontiac	DAY; 7	CAR; 43	LVS; DNQ	ATL; 43	DAR; 31	TEX; DNQ	BRI; 8	MAR; 10	TAL; 13	CAL; 26	RCH; 7	CLT; 30	DOV; 32	MCH; 27	POC; 19	SON; 8	DAY; 36	NHA; 41	POC; 16	IND; 41	GLN; 8	MCH; 31	BRI; 29	DAR; 28	RCH; 15	NHA; 33	DOV; 20	MAR; 7	CLT; 32	TAL; 19	CAR; 23	PHO; 7	HOM; 7	ATL; 24			26th	3103
2000	Kyle Petty	44	Pontiac	DAY; 25	CAR; 31	LVS; 29	ATL; 26	DAR; 25	BRI; 24	TEX; DNQ	MAR; 38	TAL; 9	CAL; 26	RCH; 28		DOV; DNQ	MCH; 39	POC; 41	SON; 19	DAY; 30		POC; 40	IND; DNQ	GLN; 41	MCH; DNQ	BRI; 22														37th	1860
2000	Steve Grissom	44	Pontiac												CLT; DNQ						NHA; 36						DAR; 26	RCH; 27	NHA; DNQ	DOV; 27	MAR; DNQ	CLT; DNQ	TAL; 16	CAR; DNQ	PHO; DNQ	HOM; DNQ	ATL; DNQ			37th	1860
2001	Buckshot Jones	44	Dodge	DAY; 29	CAR; 35	LVS; 36	ATL; 19	DAR; 41	BRI; 33	TEX; 33	MAR; 38	TAL; 16	CAL; DNQ	RCH; DNQ	CLT; 27	DOV; 26	MCH; 36	POC; 42	SON; 36	DAY; DNQ	CHI; 38	NHA; 24	POC; 39	IND; 36		MCH; DNQ	BRI; 43	DAR; 35	RCH; 37	DOV; 38	KAN; 31	CLT; DNQ	MAR; 30	TAL; 28	PHO; 16	CAR; 38	HOM; 34	ATL; 33	NHA; 41	41st	1939
2001	Wally Dallenbach Jr.	44	Dodge																						GLN; DNQ															41st	1939
2002	Buckshot Jones	44	Dodge	DAY; DNQ	CAR; 41	LVS; 23	ATL; 12	DAR; 19	BRI; 40	TEX; 26	MAR; 33																													37th	2031
2002	Steve Grissom	44	Dodge									TAL; 25	CAL; 33	RCH; 8	CLT; 32	DOV; 25	POC; 26	MCH; 40		DAY; DNQ	CHI; 31	NHA; 28													MAR; 40					37th	2031
2002	Jerry Nadeau	44	Dodge																SON; 34				POC; 36	IND; 24	GLN; 26	MCH; 32	BRI; 21	DAR; 41	RCH; 27	NHA; 28	DOV; 42	KAN; 27	TAL; 24	CLT; 13						37th	2031
2002	Ted Musgrave	44	Dodge																																	ATL; 28				37th	2031
2002	Greg Biffle	44	Dodge																																		CAR; 25		HOM; 25	37th	2031
2002	Christian Fittipaldi	44	Dodge																																			PHO; 41		37th	2031
2003	Christian Fittipaldi	44	Dodge	DAY	CAR	LVS	ATL	DAR	BRI	TEX	TAL	MAR	CAL	RCH	CLT	DOV	POC	MCH	SON	DAY; DNQ	CHI	NHA	POC	IND	GLN; 40	MCH	BRI	DAR	RCH	NHA	DOV; DNQ	TAL; 28	KAN	CLT; 34	MAR	ATL	PHO	CAR	HOM	57th	183

=== Car No. 45 history ===
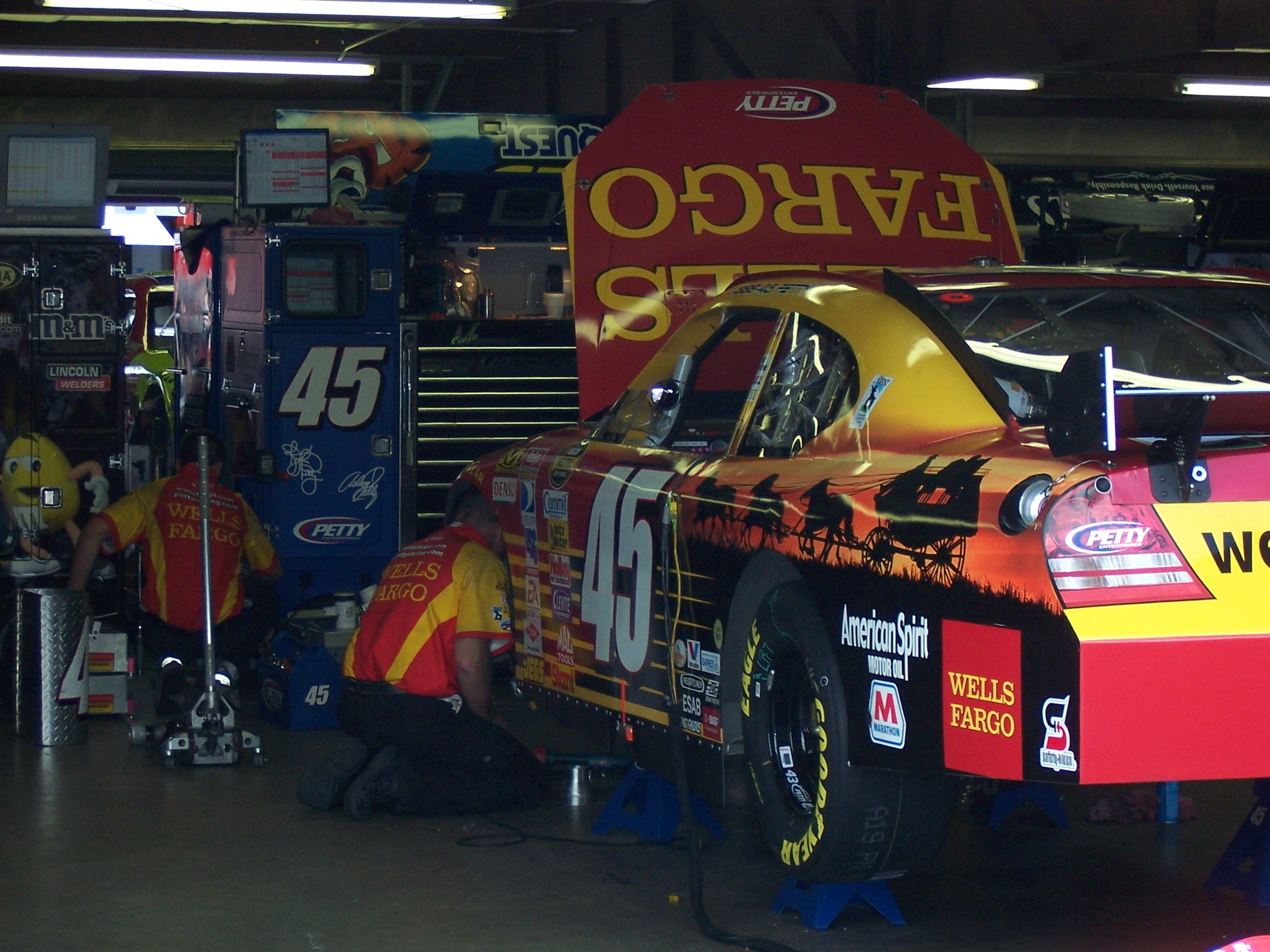
Kyle Petty's 2007 Dodge Avenger

The No. 45 was not always part of Petty Enterprises.

==== Adam Petty (2000) ====
The team appeared to be on the rise again with fourth-generation driver Adam Petty joining the team. He made his first Winston Cup start in April 2000, and many experts believed he would be the future of the team. Kyle Petty was planning to move out of the cockpit soon after, and into the full-time ownership role of the team.

About a month and a half after his first career Winston Cup start, Adam Petty was killed in a practice crash at New Hampshire International Speedway in Loudon, New Hampshire. The tragedy deeply affected the team. Kyle Petty took over what was supposed to be Adam's No. 45 car, and drove it for several seasons in his honor.

==== Kyle Petty (2001-2008) ====
Kyle Petty would have sponsorships from Sprint now driving the No. 45 in honor of his son. From 2003 to 2005, he would pick up Georgia-Pacific and Brawny (moving over from the No. 44 team) as his sponsors, but was still unable to bring Petty Enterprises back to its former days. With the addition of both Bobby Labonte and Robbie Loomis in 2006, as well as sponsors Wells Fargo and National Tire & Battery, Petty improved his position to 34th in the points.

For 2007, with the passing of Benny Parsons, Petty would join TNT for six races, dubbed their "Summer Series". During this time, John Andretti returned to the team for four races, and NASCAR Craftsman Truck Series driver Chad McCumbee made his debut at Pocono Raceway. Before his stint in the booth for TNT, Petty had some significant on-track success, finishing third in the Coca-Cola 600, his first Top 5 Cup finish since 1997. After the Centurion Boats at the Glen, Kyle injured his hand in the team's hauler due to punching a desk. Petty would sit out two races while Kenny Wallace and McCumbee filled in. The No. 45 team finished 35th in the 2007 owners points. Kyle Petty in an interview with NASCAR.com said: "I no longer work for the team" when referring to Petty Enterprises.

While the No. 45 car posted no Top 10s and went through multiple sponsors and drivers, it was announced in early December 2008 that Petty Enterprises may cease operations and liquidate its assets since Boston Venture was unable to secure sponsorship for the No. 45. In January 2009, when Petty Enterprises merged with Gillett Evernham Motorsports, the No. 45 team was folded, leaving Kyle Petty with no ride for 2009.

==== Car No. 45 results ====
Year	Driver	No.	Make	1	2	3	4	5	6	7	8	9	10	11	12	13	14	15	16	17	18	19	20	21	22	23	24	25	26	27	28	29	30	31	32	33	34	35	36	Owners	Pts
2000	Adam Petty	45	Chevy	DAY	CAR	LVS	ATL	DAR	BRI	TEX; 40	MAR	TAL	CAL	RCH	CLT	DOV	MCH	POC	SON	DAY	NHA	POC	IND	GLN	MCH	BRI	DAR	RCH	NHA	DOV										64th	103
2000	Kyle Petty	45	Pontiac																												MAR; 31	CLT	TAL	CAR	PHO	HOM; DNQ	ATL			64th	103
2001	Kyle Petty	45	Dodge	DAY; 16	CAR; DNQ	LVS; DNQ	ATL; 42	DAR; 35	BRI; 41	TEX; DNQ	MAR; 42	TAL; DNQ	CAL; 35	RCH; 22	CLT; DNQ	DOV; DNQ	MCH; 27	POC; 34	SON; 22	DAY; 29	CHI; DNQ	NHA; 26	POC; 31	IND; DNQ	GLN; 39	MCH; 25	BRI; DNQ	DAR; 26	RCH; 25	DOV; 43	KAN; DNQ	CLT; DNQ	MAR; DNQ	TAL; 33	PHO; 43	CAR; 43	HOM; 16	ATL; 30	NHA; 23	43rd	1673
2002	Kyle Petty	45	Dodge	DAY; 41	CAR; 37	LVS; 30	ATL; 15	DAR; 14	BRI; 12	TEX; 21	MAR; 20	TAL; 10	CAL; 17	RCH; 23	CLT; 13	DOV; 20	POC; 13	MCH; 12	SON; 17	DAY; 19	CHI; 24	NHA; 37	POC; 27	IND; 25	GLN; 29	MCH; 25	BRI; 15	DAR; 13	RCH; 17	NHA; 39	DOV; 16	KAN; 15	TAL; 16	CLT; 20	MAR; 37	ATL; 14	CAR; 30	PHO; 32	HOM; 31	22nd	3501
2003	Kyle Petty	45	Dodge	DAY; 13	CAR; 35	LVS; 31	ATL; 34	DAR; 36	BRI; 34		TAL; 11	MAR; 34	CAL; 28	RCH; 27	CLT; 30	DOV; 43	POC; 27	MCH; 34	SON; 27	DAY; 23	CHI; 27	NHA; 32	POC; 34	IND; 40	GLN; 42	MCH; 16	BRI; 34	DAR; 27	RCH; 34	NHA; 30	DOV; 32	TAL; DNQ	KAN; 23	CLT; 40	MAR; 25	ATL; 25	PHO; 35	CAR; 32	HOM; DNQ	37th	2414
2003	Christian Fittipaldi	45	Dodge							TEX; 38																														37th	2414
2004	Kyle Petty	45	Dodge	DAY; 21	CAR; 39	LVS; 12	ATL; 28	DAR; 34	BRI; 25	TEX; 21	MAR; 18	TAL; 24	CAL; 39	RCH; 27	CLT; 38	DOV; 37	POC; 37	MCH; 18	SON; 32	DAY; 24	CHI; 26	NHA; 27	POC; 19	IND; 23	GLN; 18	MCH; 29	BRI; 37	CAL; 35	RCH; 34	NHA; 21	DOV; 17	TAL; 29	KAN; 38	CLT; 27	MAR; 22	ATL; 29	PHO; 28	DAR; 35	HOM; DNQ	33rd	2811
2005	Kyle Petty	45	Dodge	DAY; 17	CAL; 18	LVS; 25	ATL; 36	BRI; 8	MAR; 18	TEX; 24	PHO; 31	TAL; 43	DAR; 28	RCH; 33	CLT; 17	DOV; 19	POC; 41	MCH; 30	SON; 27	DAY; 19	CHI; 27	NHA; 29	POC; 30	IND; 13	GLN; 20	MCH; 33	BRI; 25	CAL; 41	RCH; 27	NHA; 21	DOV; 8	TAL; 24	KAN; 29	CLT; 15	MAR; 14	ATL; 25	TEX; 21	PHO; 19	HOM; 27	27th	3288
2006	Kyle Petty	45	Dodge	DAY; 39	CAL; 25	LVS; 29	ATL; 8	BRI; 18	MAR; 30	TEX; 39	PHO; 31	TAL; 18	RCH; 26	DAR; 18	CLT; 25	DOV; 27	POC; 40	MCH; 35	SON; 21	DAY; 28	CHI; 28	NHA; 28	POC; 42	IND; 27	GLN; 30	MCH; 31	BRI; 34	CAL; 35	RCH; 34	NHA; 37	DOV; 25	KAN; 29	TAL; 38	CLT; 22	MAR; 10	ATL; 17	TEX; 11	PHO; 25	HOM; 28	32nd	2928
2007	Kyle Petty	45	Dodge	DAY; 42	CAL; 22	LVS; 28	ATL; 34	BRI; 20	MAR; 22	TEX; 35	PHO; 30	TAL; 18	RCH; 25	DAR; 25	CLT; 3	DOV; 34			SON; 39				IND; 32	POC; 34	GLN; 43			CAL; 28	RCH; 35	NHA; 37	DOV; 40	KAN; 21	TAL; 28	CLT; 18	MAR; 21	ATL; 13	TEX; 42	PHO; 29	HOM; 34	35th	2814
2007	Chad McCumbee	45	Dodge														POC; 25									MCH; 41														35th	2814
2007	John Andretti	45	Dodge															MCH; 27		NHA; 42	DAY; 28	CHI; 18																		35th	2814
2007	Kenny Wallace	45	Dodge																								BRI; 32													35th	2814
2008	Kyle Petty	45	Dodge	DAY; 34	CAL; 38	LVS; 41	ATL; 32	BRI; 28	MAR; DNQ		PHO; DNQ	TAL; 32	RCH; 27	DAR; 41	CLT; 36												BRI; 31	CAL; 38	RCH; 24		DOV; 40	KAN; 41						PHO; 39		41st	2253
2008	Chad McCumbee	45	Dodge							TEX; DNQ						DOV; DNQ								POC; 17						NHA; 42				CLT; 35	MAR; 25	ATL; 35	TEX; DNQ		HOM; 36	41st	2253
2008	Terry Labonte	45	Dodge														POC; 30	MCH; 29	SON; 17	NHA; 35	DAY; 16	CHI; 38	IND; 27			MCH; 32							TAL; 17							41st	2253
2008	Boris Said	45	Dodge																						GLN; 24															41st	2253

== Busch Series ==
=== Car No. 8 history ===
In 2000, Petty Enterprises fielded the No. 8 car for Steve Grissom at Rockingham. He finished 37th.

==== Car No. 8 results ====
Year	Driver	No.	Make	1	2	3	4	5	6	7	8	9	10	11	12	13	14	15	16	17	18	19	20	21	22	23	24	25	26	27	28	29	30	31	32	NBSC	Pts
2000	Steve Grissom	8	Chevy	DAY	CAR	LVS	ATL	DAR	BRI	TEX	NSV	TAL	CAL	RCH	NHA	CLT	DOV	SBO	MYB	GLN	MLW	NZH	PPR	GTY	IRP	MCH	BRI	DAR	RCH	DOV	CLT	CAR; 37	MEM	PHO	HOM		

=== Car No. 30 history ===
Petty Enterprises made their Busch Series debut in 1988 with Kyle Petty as the driver of the No. 30 car.

==== Car No. 30 results ====
Year	Driver	No.	Make	1	2	3	4	5	6	7	8	9	10	11	12	13	14	15	16	17	18	19	20	21	22	23	24	25	26	27	28	29	30	NBSC	Pts
1988	Kyle Petty	30	Ford	DAY; 12	HCY	CAR; 14	MAR	DAR; 37	BRI; 18	LNG	NZH	SBO	NSV	CLT; 14	DOV; 34	ROU	LAN	LVL	MYB	OXF	SBO	HCY	LNG	IRP; 8	ROU	BRI	DAR; 15	RCH	DOV; 30	MAR	CLT; 37	CAR; 25	MAR		

=== Car No. 43 history ===
In 1994, Petty Enterprises hired Rodney Combs to drive the No. 43 Black Flag/French's Pontiac the following year. Despite the famous ride, 1994 was a roller coaster. Combs did not make four of the 27 races, but matched his three top-10s of '93. Combs best runs were a pair of 9th at Martinsville and Myrtle Beach and a 10th at Bristol. Yet, Combs did have seven other top-20s. However, in addition to poor qualifying results with the first year team, Combs' team had 9 DNFs, a tough thing to overcome. (In Combs' defense, all but two were mechanical) This led to a poor 21st place showing in points.

Combs' best career year in any NASCAR series came in 1995, where he finished 11th in points. This year, Combs made all the races, and this enabled him to once again earn three top-10s. Combs earned new career bests of 6th at Myrtle Beach and Atlanta, and tacked on a 10th at Dover International Speedway and a large 16 other top-20s to boot. Along with a lesser DNF count (4), Combs' team looked in good shape for 1996.

However, 1996 was not Combs' best year, and it began to lead to his departure from the sport. Combs made all but one start in 1996, and earned 18th in points, after another up-and-down year. Combs earned a pair of sixths as his only top-10s in 1996 at Daytona and Atlanta. (Combs would later prove to have a career best finish of 6th-four times) Combs did earn what would prove to be his best career start: a 3rd at Myrtle Beach. However, on the flipside, Combs only earned 9 top-20s, down from 19 in 1995, the primary reason for his points slide.

In 1997, Petty Enterprises sold the 43 team to David Ridling.

==== Car No. 43 results ====
Year	Driver	No.	Make	1	2	3	4	5	6	7	8	9	10	11	12	13	14	15	16	17	18	19	20	21	22	23	24	25	26	27	28	NBSC	Pts
1994	Rodney Combs	43	Pontiac	DAY; 11	CAR; 27	RCH; 38	ATL; 18	MAR; 9	DAR; 28	HCY; DNQ	BRI; 10	ROU; 28	NHA; 29	NZH; 38	CLT; 27	DOV; 14	MYB; 9	GLN; 11	MLW; 14	SBO; 13	TAL; 28	HCY; DNQ	IRP; 17	MCH; 39	BRI	DAR; 42	RCH; 35	DOV; 24	CLT; 32				
1994	Dick Trickle	43	Pontiac																											MAR; 35			
1994	Robert Pressley	43	Pontiac																												CAR; 10		
1995	Rodney Combs	43	Pontiac	DAY; 16	CAR; 11	RCH; 20	ATL; 6	NSV; 16	DAR; 17	BRI; 19	HCY; 19	NHA; 12	NZH; 21	CLT; 41	DOV; 11	MYB; 6	GLN; 14	MLW; 23	TAL; 39	SBO; 13	IRP; 33	MCH; 17	BRI; 15	DAR; 20	RCH; 36	DOV; 10	CLT; 15	CAR; 17	HOM; 22				
1996	Rodney Combs	43	Chevy	DAY; 6			ATL; 6		DAR; 34		HCY; 21	NZH; 17	CLT; 26			MYB; 22	GLN; 21	MLW; 28	NHA; 27	TAL; 35	IRP; 28	MCH; 20	BRI; 22	DAR; 17	RCH; 17	DOV; 12	CLT; DNQ	CAR; 34	HOM; 38				
1996	Rodney Combs	43	Pontiac		CAR; DNQ	RCH; 11		NSV; 19		BRI; 28				DOV; 11	SBO; 24																		

=== Car No. 45 history ===
In 1999, Petty Enterprises fielded the No. 45 Chevrolet for Adam Petty. Petty finished sixth in his first Busch Series race at Daytona and had a best finish of fourth place at Fontana, though he also failed to qualify for three of the Busch races. Petty finished the 1999 season 20th overall in points.

Petty Enterprises planned to have Petty run a second Busch season in 2000, while giving him seven starts in the 2000 NASCAR Winston Cup Series, in preparation for a full Winston Cup campaign in 2001. On May 12, 2000, in a practice session for the Busch 200 race at New Hampshire Motor Speedway, which would have been his 48th career Busch Series start, Petty's throttle had stuck wide open going into the third turn of the track, causing the car to hit the outside wall virtually head on, killing Adam instantly as he developed a basilar skull fracture. He was 19 years old. Adam's father Kyle Petty, who had driven the No. 44 Hot Wheels-sponsored Pontiac Grand Prix Winston Cup car at the time of his son's fatal crash at New Hampshire, chose to take over Adam's No. 45 car in the Busch Series for the remainder of 2000 season.

In 2001, Steve Grissom drove the No. 45 car at Daytona. He finished 26th.

==== Car No. 45 results ====
Year	Driver	No.	Make	1	2	3	4	5	6	7	8	9	10	11	12	13	14	15	16	17	18	19	20	21	22	23	24	25	26	27	28	29	30	31	32	33	NBSC	Pts
1999	Adam Petty	45	Chevy	DAY; 6	CAR; DNQ			DAR; 24	TEX; 39	NSV; 13	BRI; 18	TAL; 23	CAL; 4	NHA; 24	RCH; 28	NZH; 5	CLT; 43	DOV; 40	SBO; 33	GLN; 32	MLW; 30	MYB; DNQ	PPR; 29	GTY; 34	IRP; 27	MCH; 35	BRI; 22	DAR; 15	RCH; 40	DOV; 30	CLT; DNQ	CAR; 30	MEM; 5	PHO; 38	HOM; 33			
1999	Adam Petty	45	Pontiac			LVS; 29	ATL; 34																															
2000	Adam Petty	45	Chevy	DAY; 37	CAR; 27	LVS; 17	ATL; 25	DAR; 16	BRI; 40	TEX; 39	NSV; 34	TAL; 12	CAL; 27	RCH; 16	NHA; Wth	CLT																						
2000	Kyle Petty	45	Chevy														DOV; 26	SBO	MYB	GLN	MLW; 8	NZH; 5	PPR	GTY; 9	IRP; 15	MCH; 11	BRI; 19	DAR; 13	RCH; 29	DOV; 40	CLT; 17	CAR; 15	MEM; 21	PHO; 16	HOM; 9			
2001	Steve Grissom	45	Chevy	DAY; 26	CAR	LVS	ATL	DAR	BRI	TEX	NSH	TAL	CAL	RCH	NHA	NZH	CLT	DOV	KEN	MLW	GLN	CHI	GTY	PPR	IRP	MCH	BRI	DAR	RCH	DOV	KAN	CLT	MEM	PHO	CAR	HOM		

== Craftsman Truck Series ==
=== Truck No. 34 history ===
In 1999, Petty Enterprises fielded the No. 34 truck for Adam Petty at Richmond and Texas.

==== Truck No. 34 results ====
Year	Driver	No.	Make	1	2	3	4	5	6	7	8	9	10	11	12	13	14	15	16	17	18	19	20	21	22	23	24	25	NCTC	Pts
1999	Adam Petty	34	Dodge	HOM	PHO	EVG	MMR	MAR	MEM	PPR	I70	BRI	TEX	PIR	GLN	MLW	NSV	NZH	MCH	NHA	IRP	GTY	HPT	RCH; 10	LVS	LVL	TEX; 16	CAL		

=== Truck No. 42 history ===
In 1997, Petty Enterprises fielded the No. 42 truck for Ken Bouchard at Texas. He finished 10th.

==== Truck No. 42 results ====
Year	Driver	No.	Make	1	2	3	4	5	6	7	8	9	10	11	12	13	14	15	16	17	18	19	20	21	22	23	24	25	26	NCTC	Pts
1997	Ken Bouchard	42	Dodge	WDW	TUS	HOM	PHO	POR	EVG	I70	NHA	TEX; 10	BRI	NZH	MLW	LVL	CNS	HPT	IRP	FLM	NSV	GLN	RCH	MAR	SON	MMR	CAL	PHO	LVS		

=== Truck No. 43 history ===
In 1995, Petty Enterprises made their Craftsman Truck Series debut with Rodney Combs drove the No. 43 truck part-time.

In 1996, the No. 43 would run full-time with Rich Bickle as the driver. He won two poles and ended the season with 9 top-10 finishes.

In 1997, Jimmy Hensley joined the team to pilot the No. 43 Cummins Dodge in the next three seasons.

In 1998, Hensley found victory lane at Nashville and finished sixth in the final points standings.

In 1999, he finished first at Martinsville, recording what would be the last win of his career.

In 2000, Steve Grissom was hired by Petty Enterprises to drive their No. 43 Dodge Ram in the Craftsman Truck Series. While he did not visit victory lane, Grissom finished in the top-five six times and finished tenth in points.

In 2001, Carlos Contreras would drive the No. 43 Dodge full-time. He would post two top tens on the season and move up to 14th in the overall points standings.

In 2002, Contreras returned with to the series with Petty Enterprises and again turned in another solid season. He would post one top ten on the season and would rank 16th in the overall point standings.

==== Truck No. 43 results ====
Year	Driver	No.	Make	1	2	3	4	5	6	7	8	9	10	11	12	13	14	15	16	17	18	19	20	21	22	23	24	25	26	27	NCTC	Pts
1995	Rodney Combs	43	Chevy	PHO	TUS	SGS	MMR	POR	EVG	I70	LVL	BRI	MLW; 10	CNS	HPT	IRP; 4	FLM	RCH; 16	MAR; 14	NWS; 11	SON	MMR	PHO									
1996	Rich Bickle	43	Dodge	HOM; 21	PHO; 30	POR; 27	EVG; 4	TUS; 2*	CNS; 32	HPT; 12	BRI; 19	NZH; 15	MLW; 20	LVL; 27	I70; 10	IRP; 5	FLM; 3	GLN; 5	NSV; 18	RCH; 16	NHA; 12	MAR; 7	NWS; 8	SON; 29	MMR; 8	PHO; 11	LVS; 11					
1997	Jimmy Hensley	43	Dodge	WDW; 6	TUS; 8	HOM; 13	PHO; 14	POR; 11	EVG; 25	I70; 2	NHA; 23	TEX; 12	BRI; 8	NZH; 25	MLW; 8	LVL; 3	CNS; 8	HPT; 7	IRP; 3*	FLM; 13	NSV; 15	GLN; 6	RCH; 13	MAR; 4	SON; 6	MMR; 9	CAL; 34	PHO; 19	LVS; 15			
1998	Jimmy Hensley	43	Dodge	WDW; 14	HOM; 28	PHO; 14	POR; 12	EVG; 19	I70; 24	GLN; 31	TEX; 33	BRI; 9	MLW; 2	NZH; 6	CAL; 20	PPR; 5	IRP; 14	NHA; 6	FLM; 5	NSV; 1	HPT; 3	LVL; 7	RCH; 16	MEM; 3	GTY; 6	MAR; 2	SON; 5	MMR; 21	PHO; 9	LVS; 3		
1999	Jimmy Hensley	43	Dodge	HOM; 29	PHO; 7	EVG; 21	MMR; 5	MAR; 1	MEM; 30	PPR; 5	I70; 5*	BRI; 12	TEX; 8	PIR; 23	GLN; 23	MLW; 12	NSV; 3	NZH; 9	MCH; 3	NHA; 9	IRP; 30	GTY; 10	HPT; 14	RCH; 15	LVS; 7	LVL; 3*	TEX; 14	CAL; 8				
2000	Steve Grissom	43	Dodge	DAY; 10	HOM; 11	PHO; 7	MMR; 4	MAR; 5	PIR; 8	GTY; 6	MEM; 5	PPR; 21	EVG; 26	TEX; 15	KEN; 18	GLN; 12	MLW; 4	NHA; 14	NZH; 4	MCH; 16	IRP; 11	NSV; 5	CIC; 24	RCH; 9	DOV; 13	TEX; 28	CAL; 18					
2001	Carlos Contreras	43	Dodge	DAY; 20	HOM; 7	MMR; 22	MAR; 11	GTY; 21	DAR; 27	PPR; 29	DOV; 12	TEX; 9	MEM; 27	MLW; 22	KAN; 12	KEN; 16	NHA; 21	IRP; 14	NSH; 17	CIC; 15	NZH; 16	RCH; 23	SBO; 17	TEX; 23	LVS; 20	PHO; 21	CAL; 22					
2002	Carlos Contreras	43	Dodge	DAY; 8	DAR; 17	MAR; 28	GTY; 16	PPR; 13	DOV; 23	TEX; 18	MEM; 15	MLW; 22	KAN; 16	KEN; 22	NHA; 15	MCH; 17	IRP; 31	NSH; 13	RCH; 19	TEX; 30	SBO; 23	LVS; 13	CAL; 18	PHO; 19	HOM; 24							

=== Truck No. 44 history ===
In 2000, Richard Petty's nephew, Mark Petty began competing in NASCAR Craftsman Truck Series in the No. 44 Dodge. He earned one top-ten.

==== Truck No. 44 results ====
Year	Driver	No.	Make	1	2	3	4	5	6	7	8	9	10	11	12	13	14	15	16	17	18	19	20	21	22	23	24	NCTC	Pts
2000	Mark Petty	44	Dodge	DAY	HOM	PHO	MMR	MAR	PIR	GTY	MEM	PPR	EVG	TEX	KEN	GLN	MLW	NHA	NZH	MCH	IRP; 22	NSV; 26	CIC; 18	RCH; 33	DOV; 18	TEX; 10	CAL; 14		

=== Truck No. 45 history ===
In 2002, Petty Enterprises fielded the No. 45 Dodge for Joe Ruttman at Nashville, where he finished 17th. Australian driver Adam Clarke also made three starts in the No. 45 with the best finish of 20th.

==== Truck No. 45 results ====
Year	Driver	No.	Make	1	2	3	4	5	6	7	8	9	10	11	12	13	14	15	16	17	18	19	20	21	22	NCTC	Pts
2002	Joe Ruttman	45	Dodge	DAY	DAR	MAR	GTY	PPR	DOV	TEX	MEM	MLW	KAN	KEN	NHA	MCH	IRP	NSH; 17									
2002	Adam Clarke	45	Dodge																RCH; 23	TEX	SBO; 20	LVS	CAL	PHO	HOM; DNQ		

== ARCA Racing Series ==
=== Car No. 42 history ===
In 2000, Scott Kuhn made two starts in the No. 42 Pontiac at Springfield and DuQoin.

==== Car No. 42 results ====
Year	Driver	No.	Make	1	2	3	4	5	6	7	8	9	10	11	12	13	14	15	16	17	18	19	20	ARSC	Pts
2000	Scott Kuhn	42	Pontiac	DAY	SLM	AND	CLT	KIL	FRS	MCH	POC	TOL	KEN	BLN	POC	WIN	ISF; 17	KEN	DSF; 31	SLM	CLT	TAL	ATL		

=== Car No. 43 history ===
In 2001, Scott Kuhn made two starts in the No. 43 Pontiac at Gateway, Memphis, and Charlotte.

In 2003, Christian Fittipaldi made two starts in the No. 43 Dodge at Daytona and Pocono.

==== Car No. 43 results ====
Year	Driver	No.	Make	1	2	3	4	5	6	7	8	9	10	11	12	13	14	15	16	17	18	19	20	21	22	23	24	25	Owners	Pts
2001	Scott Kuhn	43	Pontiac	DAY	NSH	WIN	SLM	GTY; 15	KEN	CLT	KAN	MCH	POC	MEM; 8	GLN	KEN	MCH	POC	NSH	ISF	CHI	DSF	SLM	TOL	BLN	CLT; 27	TAL	ATL		
2003	Christian Fittipaldi	43	Dodge	DAY; 10	ATL	NSH	SLM	TOL	KEN	CLT	BLN	KAN	MCH	LER	POC	POC; 31	NSH	ISF	WIN	DSF	CHI	SLM	TAL	CLT	SBO					

=== Car No. 44 history ===
Kyle Petty made his major-league stock car debut at the age of eighteen. He won the first race he entered, the 1979 Daytona ARCA 200 in the 44 Dodge Magnum, at the time, Petty became the youngest driver to win a major-league stock car race.

==== Car No. 44 results ====
Year	Driver	No.	Make	1	2	3	4	5	6	7	8	9	ARSC	Pts
1979	Kyle Petty	44	Dodge	AVS	DAY; 1*	NSV	FRS	SLM	DSP	IMS	TAL	FRS	N/A	–

=== Car No. 45 history ===
Adam Petty began his career in 1998, shortly after he turned eighteen, in the ARCA RE/MAX Series. Like his father Kyle, he won his first ARCA race, driving the No. 45 Pontiac at Lowe's Motor Speedway.

==== Car No. 45 results ====
Year	Driver	No.	Make	1	2	3	4	5	6	7	8	9	10	11	12	13	14	15	16	17	18	19	20	21	22	ARSC	Pts
1998	Adam Petty	45	Pontiac	DAY	ATL	SLM	CLT	MEM	MCH	POC	SBS	TOL	PPR	POC	KIL	FRS	ISF	ATL	DSF	SLM	TEX	WIN	CLT; 1	TAL; 29	ATL	NA	-

=== Car No. 62 history ===
In 2007, Petty Enterprises fielded the No. 62 Dodge for Chad McCumbee at Pocono, where he won the race.

==== Car No. 62 results ====
Year	Driver	No.	Make	1	2	3	4	5	6	7	8	9	10	11	12	13	14	15	16	17	18	19	20	21	22	23	ARSC	Pts
2007	Chad McCumbee	62	Dodge	DAY	USA	NSH	SLM	KAN	WIN	KEN	TOL	IOW	POC; 1	MCH	BLN	KEN	POC	NSH	ISF	MIL	GTW	DSF	CHI	SLM	TAL	TOL		

== Petty Blue ==
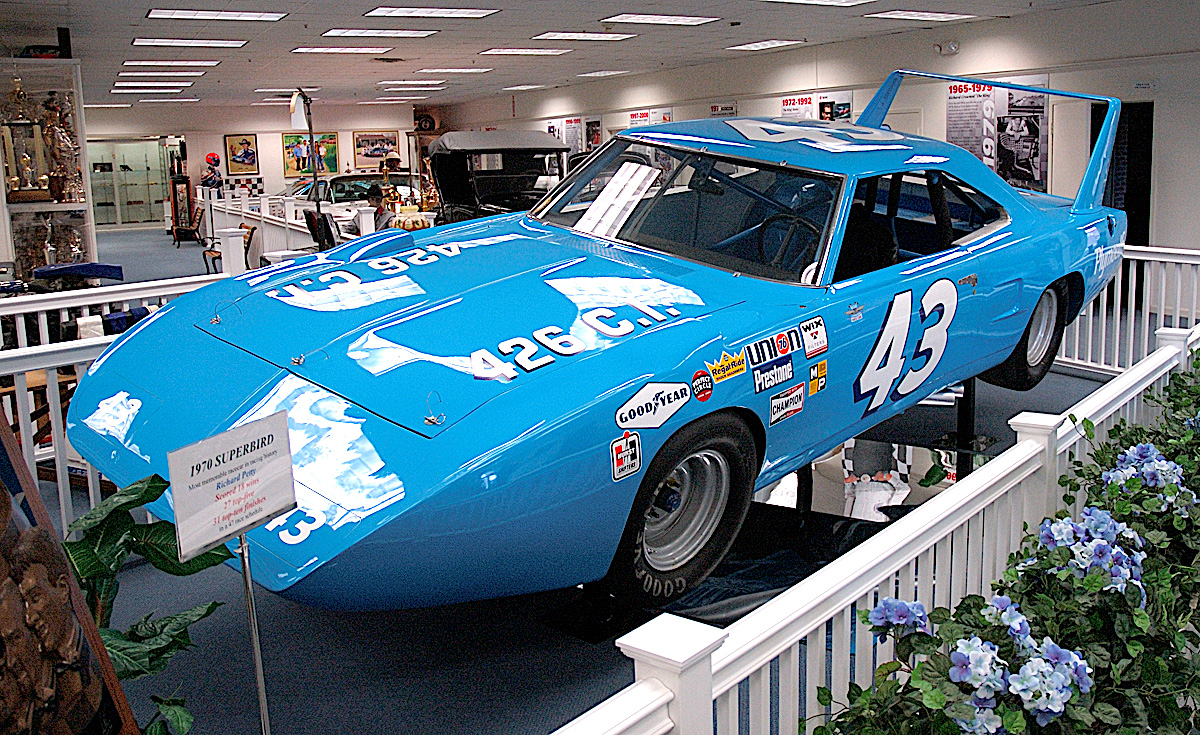
Richard Petty's "Petty Blue" 1970 Plymouth Superbird on display

One of the most distinctive features of the No. 43 car is its color. Petty Blue, as it's called, was created by the Petty family. According to Richard, the color was created by accident when they didn't have enough white or dark blue paint to cover the entire car. The resulting mix of white and blue proved to be very popular and remains on the No. 43 car to this day. Previous to that 1958 occurrence, Petty cars were generally white or red.

== See also ==
- List of NASCAR race wins by Petty Enterprises
