= Cash Records =

Cash Records is an Independent Record Label.

== History ==
Cash was located at 4854 W. Jefferson Blvd (later at 2610 S. Crenshaw) in Los Angeles and operated by John Dolphin, who ran a record shop with a small demo studio. Among the artists who recorded for the label were pianist and band leader Ernie Freeman, Jimmy Merritt, Don Deal and Jerry Capehart with The Cochran Brothers (Eddie Cochran and Hank Cochran).

== Dickie Goodman ==
Several other labels have also used the name "Cash", most of them obscure. In 1975, soon after folding his own Rainy Wednesday label, Dickie Goodman released "Mr. Jaws", a parody of the then-popular film, under the name "Cash Records". Distributed by Private Stock Records, "Mr. Jaws" was a national top-five hit in Billboard (and a #1 smash in Cash Box magazine). The single and an album, Mr. Jaws and Other Fables, were the only releases under this version of Cash.
