= Break-in record =

Novelty record combining spoken word with musical samples

A break-in record is a novelty record which combines spoken word comedy with clips of popular music to create a humorous effect. The subject matter is often inspired by contemporary events or elements of popular culture such as television shows and films. Such comedy recordings were popular in the United States for several decades beginning in 1956 with "The Flying Saucer" by Dickie Goodman and Bill Buchanan.

== Notable break-in records ==
Year	Listed artist	Title	Notes
1956	Buchanan and Goodman	"The Flying Saucer"	Dickie Goodman and Bill Buchanan produced a re-imagining of the Orson Welles 1938 radio story The War of the Worlds. In August 1956, the song reached number 3 on Billboard's pop singles chart.
1956	Buchanan and Goodman	"Buchanan and Goodman on Trial"	Satire about the legal troubles caused by their previous comedy record, "The Flying Saucer".
1957	Buchanan and Goodman	"The Banana Boat Story"	Portions of television and radio commercial jingles are linked by segments of "Day-O (The Banana Boat Song)" by the Tarriers.
1957	Buchanan and Goodman	"Flying Saucer the 2nd"	July 1957 saw this sequel hit number 18.
1957	Buchanan and Goodman	"Santa and the Satellite"	The US government works to save Santa Claus from near-space threats. Buchanan had already quit the team, so Goodman worked with the New York deejay Paul Sherman of WINS (AM). The cut rose to number 32 at Christmas 1957.
1958	Buchanan and Goodman	"The Flying Saucer Goes West"	Buchanan is not on this recording. Goodman and Sherman poke fun at alien invaders tangling with figures from the Wild West.
1960	Winkly & Nutley	"Report to the Nation, Parts 1 and 2"	The record was a parody of the 1960 US presidential election between "Mr. Dixon" (Richard Nixon) and "Mr. Finnedy" (John F. Kennedy). Winkly & Nutley were Jim Stag and Bob Mitchell, satirizing NBC news anchors Chet Huntley and David Brinkley.
1964	Bill Buchanan and Howard Greenfield	"The Invasion"	Pressed by Novel Records in Chicago, this recording lampoons the British Invasion, especially the arrival in the US of the Beatles. Billboard magazine listed it as a "regional breakout" success in October 1964.
1969	Vik Venus (alias: Your Main Moon Man)	"Moonflight"	Break-in record about the Apollo Moon landing. Buddah Records BDA 118 peaked at #38 in Billboard Hot 100 August 9, 1969.
1971	Dickie Goodman & Ruthie	"Speaking of Ecology"	Goodman and his girlfriend Ruthie cover the issues of ecology.
1972	The Delegates	"Convention '72"	The recording punctured political issues of the day, and roasted politicians familiar from news coverage of the Democratic National Convention in July 1972, and the opposing Republican National Convention in August . The writers and producers were Nick Cenci and Nick Koselaneos, helped by radio deejay Bob DeCarlo of KQV in Pennsylvania.
1973	Dickie Goodman	"Watergrate"	A parody of Richard Nixon and the Watergate scandal.
1973	John & Ernest	"Super Fly Meets Shaft"	Dickie Goodman and Sal Passantino present a parody of the blaxploitation films Super Fly (1972) and Shaft (1971). It topped out at number 31 on Billboard's pop singles chart in May 1973.
1974	Dickie Goodman	"Mr. President"	More developments in the Watergate scandal.
1974	Evil Boll-Weevil	"Grand Canyon"	The narrative by WQXI (AM) radio deejays Jeff McKee and Ed Brown parodies stuntman Evel Knievel who is heard talking about jumping over the Grand Canyon. An Ed Sullivan sound-alike is also heard; Sullivan's death in October likely diminished this disc's airplay.
1974	Dickie Goodman	"Energy Crisis '74"	This record makes fun of the 1970s energy crisis, especially the 1973 oil crisis in the US. It hit number 33 on the Hot 100.
1975	Dickie Goodman	"Mr. Jaws"	Goodman "interviewed" characters from the film Jaws. The track reached number 4 on the Hot 100 in September 1975.
1975	Albert Brooks	"Party From Outer Space (Featuring Phony Hits)"	Parody of the Goodman records, co-written and produced by Brooks and Harry Shearer; with original contributions from Linda Ronstadt, Harry Nilsson, Alice Cooper, Andrew Gold and others.
1975	Chris Hill	"Renta Santa"	Borrowing Goodman's technique, "Renta Santa" features snippets of hits and was a UK Top 10 hit.
1976	Chris Hill	"Bionic Santa"	Similar in format to Goodman's records and "Renta Santa", and another UK Top 10 hit.
1977	Dickie Goodman	"Kong"	Goodman "interviewed" characters from the 1976 film King Kong.
1982	Dickie Goodman	"Hey E.T."	The 1982 film E.T. the Extra-Terrestrial is lampooned. It was Goodman's final chart hit, edging into the Cashbox chart at number 97 in September 1982.

== See also ==
- Mashup culture
- YouTube Poop, similarly edited humorous videos often incorporating music videos, popular in the 2000s and 2010s
