= Robbie Loomis =

American racing crew chief

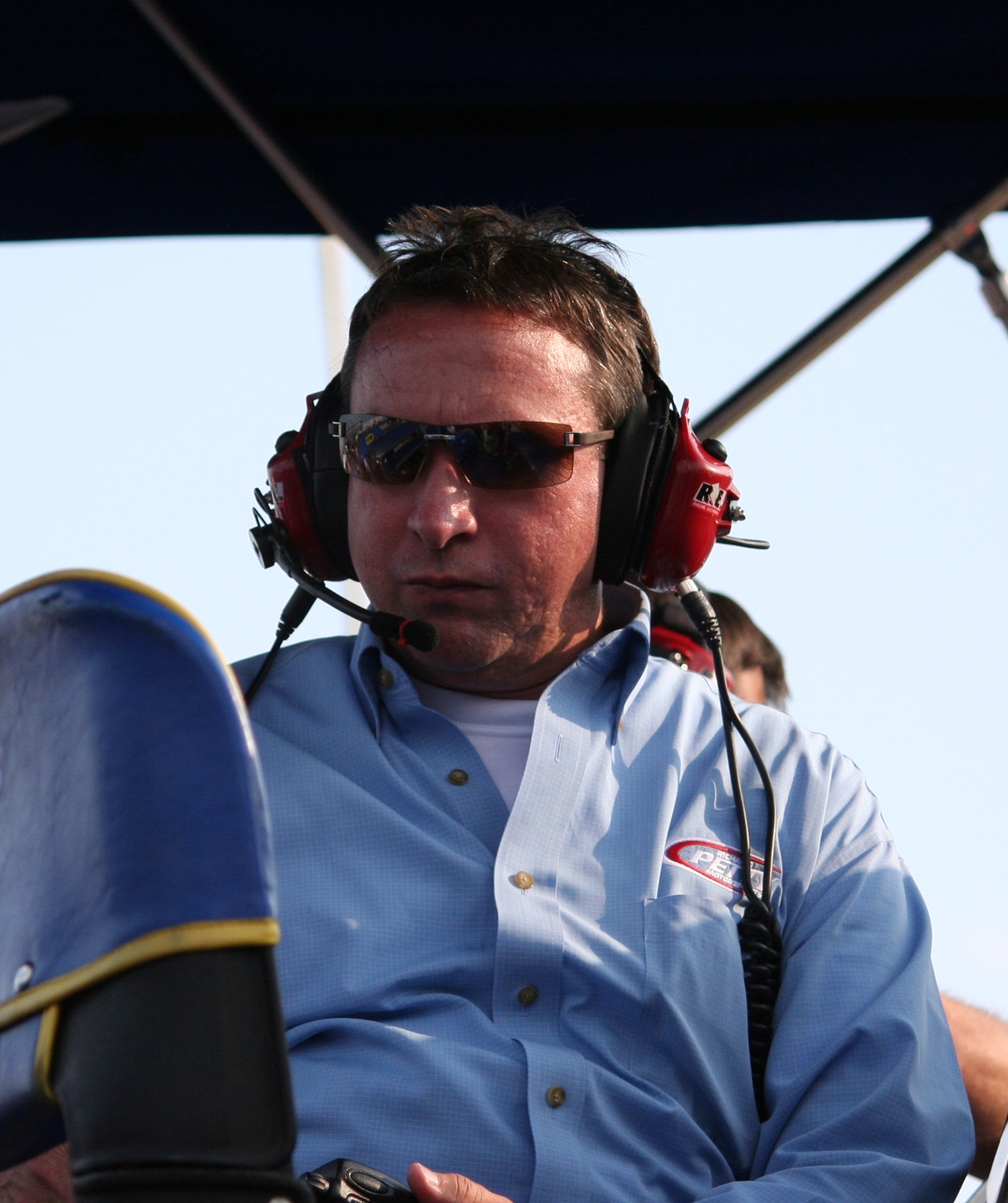
- Loomis at Charlotte Motor Speedway in 2011
- Born: Donald Robert Loomis; June 7, 1964 (age 62)
- Occupation: NASCAR Crew Chief
- Years active: 1990-present
- Known for: Serving as crew chief for Richard Petty and Jeff Gordon

Donald Robert Loomis (born June 7, 1964) is a former NASCAR crew chief who worked for Petty Enterprises and Hendrick Motorsports during his time as a crew chief, working most notably with Richard Petty and Jeff Gordon. Loomis won the 2001 NASCAR Winston Cup Series championship as Gordon's crew chief, and collected a total of 26 wins and 98 top 5s.

Loomis has served as vice president for racing operations at Petty Enterprises, returning there in 2006.

With the team that emerged from the merger of Gillett Evernham Motorsports and Petty Holdings, Loomis served as the executive director of racing operations, prior to being released in 2012.

== Crew chief for the #43 Petty Enterprises team ==
Loomis's first professional crew chief position came with Petty Enterprises in 1990, when he replaced Dale Inman as Richard Petty's crew chief. He worked with Petty Enterprises as crew chief for nine years. As an underdog at Petty Enterprises, Loomis managed to lead the famed #43 car to the winner's circle three times. He won in 1996 (Phoenix) and in 1997 (Rockingham) with Bobby Hamilton. John Andretti piloted the car to victory lane in 1999 (Martinsville). In 2000, Loomis earned the honor to work at Hendrick Motorsports as Jeff Gordon's crew chief and prior to that he had not received a check from anyone other than Petty Enterprises. The Pettys supported Loomis's departure. In Jeff Gordon's autobiography, Richard Petty is quoted as telling Loomis the following:

I took it for granted that you'd always be around. Now, if you were talking to me about ninety-nine percent of the deals you could possibly have, I'd tell you to get out of here and get back to work. But Rick Hendrick is good people.

This is a real good opportunity for you. Jeff's a winner. It wouldn't matter if he was playing golf or baseball or hockey or driving a racecar, he's a winner. Winners are gonna win, and they're gonna breed winners. You're looking for something Jeff and I have already found. We've won races. We've won championships. That's what you're searching for. I've always told you that what you needed was a twenty-five year old Richard Petty. I think you've got that in Jeff.

== Crew chief for the #24 Hendrick Motorsports team ==
Robbie Loomis's greatest success came as crew chief for NASCAR legend Jeff Gordon. The pair's first season in 2000 was a struggle. Despite winning three races and finishing 9th in the season standings, performance was well-short of the high standards set by the #24 Hendrick Motorsports team. However, in the final five races of the year, the team posted five top-tens and three top-fives: a clear indication of the improving communication between Loomis and Gordon.

The momentum carried into 2001 and the #24 team reached the pinnacle of the sport by winning the NASCAR Winston Cup Championship. In addition, the team won six races, including the prestigious Brickyard 400. The following years, in 2002 and 2003, the team performed respectably, ranking fourth in the standings and winning three races in both years, but their performance was not quite of the championship caliber expected from the #24 team.

Loomis and the team almost returned to championship glory in 2004, but finished third in NASCAR's first "Chase for the Championship" by a heartbreaking 16 points to winner Kurt Busch. They won five races that year, including another Brickyard 400, and also earned the most points of any team for the entire year.

2005 began in thrilling fashion as Loomis won his very first Daytona 500: NASCAR's crown jewel event. The #24 team also went on to win at Martinsville and Talladega early in the year, but the rest of the season would be a nightmare. The #24 team experienced radical handling problems at downforce tracks. After a second-place finish at Darlington in the season's tenth event, the #24 team failed to produce another top-five finish in the next 16 races under Loomis. The team shockingly missed NASCAR's "Chase for the Championship," and Loomis was replaced by 26-year-old Steve Letarte for the final 10 races to prepare the young crew chief for 2006. Loomis had been grooming Letarte, the team's car chief since 2002, to take over the position. Loomis had already planned on leaving the stressful job after 2005 due to a reorganization of priorities. Loomis's mother, Sallie, survived a serious pancreatic illness the previous year.

In January 2012, Loomis was released of his duties as Chief Operating Officer for Richard Petty Motorsports.

== Philanthropy ==
In addition to NASCAR, Loomis works on charitable projects. With his family, he founded The Robbie Loomis Foundation in 2002, which joined the NASCAR Foundation Family of Charities in 2007. The public, not-for-profit 501 (c)(3) foundation awards need-based grants and scholarships to students in grades K through 12.
