= The Flying Saucer (song) =

Single by Buchanan and Goodman
- B-side: "The Flying Saucer (Part 2)"
- Released: July 1956
- Genre: Mashup; novelty; break-in; sound collage
- Length: 2:33 (Part 1); 1:44 (Part 2); 4:17 (both parts)
- Label: Luniverse
- Songwriters: Bill Buchanan; Dickie Goodman
- Producers: Buchanan and Goodman

Buchanan and Goodman singles chronology
"The Flying Saucer" (1956)	"Buchanan and Goodman on Trial" (1956)

"The Flying Saucer" (also known as "The Flying Saucer Parts 1 & 2") is a novelty record, the first of a series of break-in records released by Bill Buchanan and Dickie Goodman (credited simply as "Buchanan & Goodman"). The song is considered to be an early (perhaps the earliest) example of a mashup, featuring segments of popular songs intertwined with spoken "news" commentary to tell the story of a visit from a flying saucer.

Bill Buchanan plays the radio announcer, stating that the spacemen are attacking Earth. Dickie Goodman plays reporter John Cameron-Cameron (a play on the broadcaster John Cameron Swayze). Goodman would re-visit this character in several other 'Flying Saucer' records.

The song was also the duo's (and Goodman's) highest-charting hit on the Billboard Hot 100 peaking at No. 3, just behind Elvis Presley's double-sided hit "Don't Be Cruel"/"Hound Dog" and the Platters' "My Prayer."

== Structure ==
Made using a reel-to-reel tape recorder, "The Flying Saucer" has been described as a "two-part sound collage", and is conceptually an audio adaptation of Orson Welles' radio drama The War of the Worlds (1938), eschewing the seriousness of the radio show for comedy by "[interspersing] popular song lyrics into the audio broadcast. The song lyrics, when taken out of their original context, would describe the Martians landing on Earth." Buchanan's "title-mangling" radio disc jockey character was supposedly based on Alan Freed.

The song uses clips from 17 different songs, each of which was a top 20 hit in 1955 or 1956. In order of occurrence:

1. Side One – 2:33
  - "Open Up That Door" by Nappy Brown (saxophone intro only)
  - "The Great Pretender" by The Platters (referenced as "Too Real" by The Clatters)
  - "I Want You to Be My Girl" by The Teenagers featuring Frankie Lymon
  - "Long Tall Sally" by Little Richard
  - "Poor Me" by Fats Domino
  - "Heartbreak Hotel" by Elvis Presley
  - "Earth Angel" by The Penguins (referenced as "Earth" by The Pelicans)
  - "I Hear You Knocking" by Smiley Lewis (referenced as "Knocking" by Laughing Lewis)
  - "Tutti Frutti" by Little Richard
  - "(You've Got) The Magic Touch" by The Platters (referenced as "Uh-Oh" by The Clatters)
  - "The Great Pretender" by The Platters
2. Side Two – 1:44
  - "Band of Gold" by Don Cherry
  - "Ain't That A Shame" by Fats Domino (referenced as "That's A Shame" by Skinny Dynamo)
  - "Band of Gold" by Don Cherry (again)
  - "Don't Be Angry" by Nappy Brown
  - "Blue Suede Shoes" by Carl Perkins (referenced as "Shoes" by Pa Gherkins)
  - "Maybellene" by Chuck Berry (referenced as "The Motor Cooled Down" by Huckle Berry)
  - "See You Later Alligator" by Bill Haley & His Comets
  - "My Prayer" by The Platters

While noting it as a novelty record, author Paul Carr highlighted the significance of "The Flying Saucer" in technological terms, writing: "Like Buchanan and Goodman, composers such as Pierre Schaeffer (Orphée 53, 1953), Pierre Boulez (Études 1 Sur un Son, 1951) and Karlheinz Stockhausen (Konkrete Etüde, 1952) also began using tape manipulation in the early 1950s when working in the genre of musique concrète. This provides a broader context for 'Flying Saucer,' all of which points to the future." Jane McGrath describes "The Flying Saucer" as an early example of a sample collage, one "less avant-garde and experimental" than James Tenney's Collage #1 (1961), which also sampled the music of Elvis Presley.

== Release and reception ==
Its wide use of "sampling" prompted music publishers to file suit against Buchanan and Goodman in July 1956. The two men were also criticized in media of the era, with an anonymous source telling Billboard, "If we can't stop this nothing is safe in our business." While "The Flying Saucer" was not the first record to quote from famous songs (see "Cool Whalin'" by Babs Gonzales), it was the first popular record to sample directly from the recordings themselves. The comedians made fun of their own predicament by issuing a follow-up song, "Buchanan and Goodman on Trial" (Luniverse 102), which just missed the Billboard Top Forty, peaking at #42. By November 1956, the novelty song had stood up in court, being labeled as artful and clever. A judge refused to issue an injunction prohibiting the sales of the record. Essentially, the record was considered a new work. This made it legal for artists to sample existing records—a practice that became very popular in subsequent years.

Alongside the trial record, Buchanan and Goodman followed the single with more "Flying Saucer" records, resulting in what has been dubbed a "UFO comedy series", as well as "The Banana Boat Story". Other artists followed suit: Dewey, George and Jack and the Belltones (three WHBQ disc jockeys and a local Memphis singing group) recorded their own version of "The Flying Saucer" under the title "Flying Saucers Have Landed" (the DJs did the spoken bits and the Belltones sang the musical snippets). Other versions of "The Flying Saucer" included one by Alan Freed, Steve Allen, Al "Jazzbo" Collins and the Modernaires With George Cates' Out Of Spacers and another by Sid Noel and his Outer Spacemen; both records used re-recorded versions of the musical bits. Although Buchanan later left the partnership, Goodman continued releasing break-in records in the same pattern, with spoof interviewers responded to with song lyrics and refrains. In 1957, The Billboard noted that sales of the Penguins' "Earth Angel" and Little Richard's "Long Tall Sally" -- both of whom had been excerpted on "The Flying Saucer" -- had increased in wake of the success of the pastiche.

== Legacy ==
"The Flying Saucer" was the first song to sample the work of other artists. Paul Carr cites it as an "interesting" early instance of "sampling and industry litigation", both of which were to become "pervasive competitors in a global music industry". Similarly, Dorian Lynskey of The Guardian credited the multiple copyright lawsuits against Buchanan and Goodman in wake of the record for making the duo "trailblazers not just in the field of sampling, but in the field of sampling-related litigation." Times Union writer Chuck Miller wrote that Buchanan and Goodman came up with "a musical concept that, at the time, was controversial and litigious – yet today, is as much a part of popular music as an auto-tune machine. Today we call the concept 'sampling,' but back then, it was part of a series of novelty and comedy records called 'break-in' records." Dave Banks cites "The Flying Saucer" as the first acknowledged example of a mashup, in which "an artist or producer might combine two or more existing songs." In 2011, The New York Times included it in their history of the mashup, again highlighting it as the first 'break-in' novelty release.

According to Carr, the hit "in many ways paved the way for artists such as Public Enemy, Freelance Hellraiser, Negativland, and Danger Mouse, to name but a few." These artists were also litigated against for sample-based copyright infringement. Steinski, later to become "a pivotal figure in the history of sampling", described "The Flying Saucer" as a formative influence, stating: "I still remember hearing it and thinking: What the hell is this? I thought: Damn, that's really crazy. That's really cool." When The Guardian included the track in a 2008 history of "mash-ups and musical plundering", they highlighted it as "[t]he record that inspired Steinski." Writing in 2010, Miller describes Goodman's influence through the record on popular music as stretching to "all the pop music hits that are built on snippets of samplings", as well as "comedy routines on late-night talk shows in which a host will interview someone, with the answer taken hilariously out of context." He added:

"The thing is, Goodman and his partner did these “snippet” or “break-in” records as quick and cheap novelty recordings. And the humor on them is really hit-and-miss; you hear the song clip and you try to associate it with the song and with the question being asked by the faux interviewer. But today an artist like Drake can poach the intro to a Hamilton, Joe Frank and Reynolds song and turn it into a pop hit of his own. Or a few years ago, when the group Garbage took an entire lyric from a Pretenders song and added it to one of their tracks. What Goodman did for laughs, musicians today do for artistic interpretation."

== Charts ==
Chart (1956)	Peak position
US Best Sellers in Stores (Billboard)	3
