= Mr. Jaws =

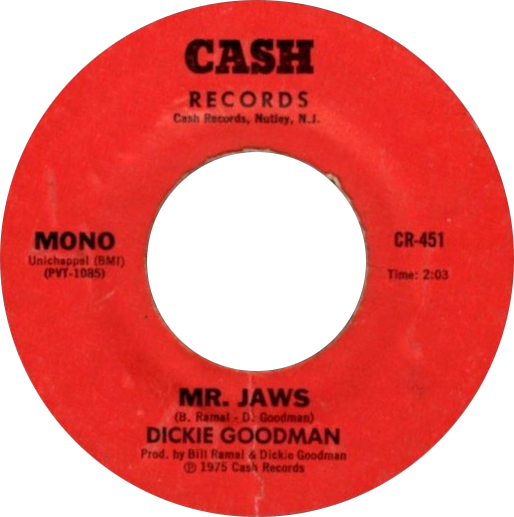
- One of side-A labels of the US single

Single by Dickie Goodman

from the album Mr. Jaws and Other Fables
- B-side: "Irv's Theme"
- Released: September 1975
- Recorded: 1975
- Studio: Sear Sound, New York City
- Genre: Novelty, spoken word
- Length: 2:02
- Label: Cash 451
- Songwriters: Bill Ramal, Richard Goodman
- Producers: Bill Ramal, Richard Goodman

Dickie Goodman singles chronology
"Mr. President" (1974)	"Mr. Jaws" (1975)	"Kong" (1977)

"Mr. Jaws" is a novelty song by Dickie Goodman released on Cash Records in 1975.

This record is a parody of the 1975 summer blockbuster film Jaws, with Goodman interviewing the shark (whom he calls "Mr. Jaws"), as well as the film's main characters, Brody, Hooper, and Quint. Goodman makes full use of his practice of "break-in" music sampling, in which all of the interview answers are lyrics from popular songs from that year.

The single peaked at #4 on the Billboard Hot 100 in October 1975. On the Cash Box Top 100, it fared even better, reaching #1.

Goodman would later make more parodies of Hollywood films, along with his political satire records. The B-side of this single was "Irv's Theme".

The name of the song's label, Cash Records, was another idea from Goodman after he was asked whom the record company should make the check out to.

The recording took place at Sear Sound in New York engineered by Russ Hamm. Originally, the songs were sampled; however, when the record became a hit, the songs were replaced on later pressings by sound-alike recordings.

== Songs ==
The songs that were sampled are:

- Main Title (Theme From 'Jaws') by John Williams
- "Dynomite" by Bazuka
- "Please Mr. Please" by Olivia Newton-John
- "How Sweet It Is (To Be Loved by You)" by James Taylor
- "Why Can't We Be Friends" by War
- "Get Down Tonight" by KC and the Sunshine Band
- "The Hustle" by Van McCoy & the Soul City Symphony
- "Love Will Keep Us Together" by Captain & Tennille
- "Rhinestone Cowboy" by Glen Campbell
- "One Of These Nights" by Eagles
- "Jive Talkin'" by Bee Gees
- "I'm Not in Love" by 10cc
- "Midnight Blue" by Melissa Manchester

On the album version of "Mr. Jaws", both "Please Mr. Please" and "Rhinestone Cowboy" were replaced by re-recorded budget sound-alike renditions.

== Charts ==
=== Weekly charts ===
Chart (1975)	Peak position
Canada Top Singles (RPM)	13
US Billboard Hot 100	4
US Cash Box Top 100	1

=== Year-end charts ===
Chart (1975)	Rank
Canada (RPM)	96

== Certifications ==
Region	Certification	Certified units/sales
Canada (Music Canada)	Gold	75,000^{^}
United States (RIAA)	Gold	1,000,000^{^}
^{^} Shipments figures based on certification alone.

== Later uses ==
- Goodman did a sequel entitled "Mrs. Jaws" in response to the film Jaws 2 (1978).
- A sequel by Edward McCormack, "The Return of Mr. Jaws", was issued in 2005.

== See also ==
- List of Cash Box Top 100 number-one singles of 1975
