= Energy Crisis '74 =

Single by Dickie Goodman
- B-side: "The Mistake" (early pressings) "Ruthie's Theme" (later pressings)
- Released: February 1974
- Genre: Novelty song
- Length: 2:10
- Label: Rainy Wednesday Records
- Songwriter: Dickie Goodman
- Producers: Dickie Goodman & Phil Kahl

Dickie Goodman singles chronology
"The Constitution" (1973)	"Energy Crisis '74" (1974)	"Screwy T.V." (1974)

Energy Crisis '74 is a novelty single by Dickie Goodman released on Rainy Wednesday Records in 1974.

== Concept ==
The record is a satire of the 1973 energy crisis in the United States, and was moderately successful; it peaked at #33 on the Billboard Hot 100 and became the first Top 40 hit for Goodman as a solo artist (Goodman's other records throughout the 1960s had mostly fallen just short of the top 40 and his 1950s works were all collaborations).

The record is structured as a series of interviews with various public and political figures of the day with regard to the energy crisis. Questions were asked by an interviewer (Goodman), and their "responses" were snippets of various hit records of the day. The record ends with Goodman saying, "we have just run out of en-er-gyyyyy" as his speech slows to a halt, as if the turntable playing the record had just been shut off.

== "The Mistake" ==
The intended B-side of the record was an instrumental by guitarist John White called "Ruthie's Theme", named for a friend's daughter and credited only to "P.D." (Goodman often placed such throwaways on the backs of his 45s, and in fact had already used "Ruthie's Theme" on the B-side of his version of "The Purple People Eater", released the previous year.) However, the record plant sent Goodman a number of discs that had only a few seconds of "Energy Crisis '74" ("Mr. President, the cri--"), followed by two minutes of silence. Rather than throw them away or demand a refund, Goodman gave the botched recording the name "The Mistake" and had the plant cut the proper version of "Energy Crisis '74" onto the other side, making "The Mistake" perhaps the most unlikely B-side ever to grace a hit record. (Later pressings correctly featured "Ruthie's Theme" on the flip.) White had previously included "Ruthie's Theme" under the name "City" on his own eponymous album in 1971.

Goodman would return to this topic with "Energy Crisis '79" five years later, but it was not a hit.

Portions of Goodman's dialogue would later be used on his son Jon Goodman's recording "Economy Crisis" in 2008.

== Songs ==
Many big hits of the day (including from three of the four ex-Beatles) were sampled on the record:

- "Leave Me Alone (Ruby Red Dress)" by Helen Reddy
- "Smokin' in the Boys Room" by Brownsville Station
- "Living for the City" by Stevie Wonder
- "Helen Wheels" by Paul McCartney and Wings
- "Mind Games" by John Lennon
- "The Joker" by Steve Miller Band
- "Goodbye Yellow Brick Road" by Elton John
- "Hello It's Me" by Todd Rundgren
- "You're Sixteen" by Ringo Starr
- "The Most Beautiful Girl" by Charlie Rich
- "Top of the World" by The Carpenters

Presumably for music rights reasons, "Energy Crisis '74" was heavily edited on Goodman's "Greatest Fables" compilation, released in 1997. Fake re-recorded snippets were used for all but two of the above tracks (except "Smokin' in the Boys Room" and "Living for the City"), with the segments for "Goodbye Yellow Brick Road" and "Top of the World" completely removed.
