= Dickie Goodman =

American music and record producer

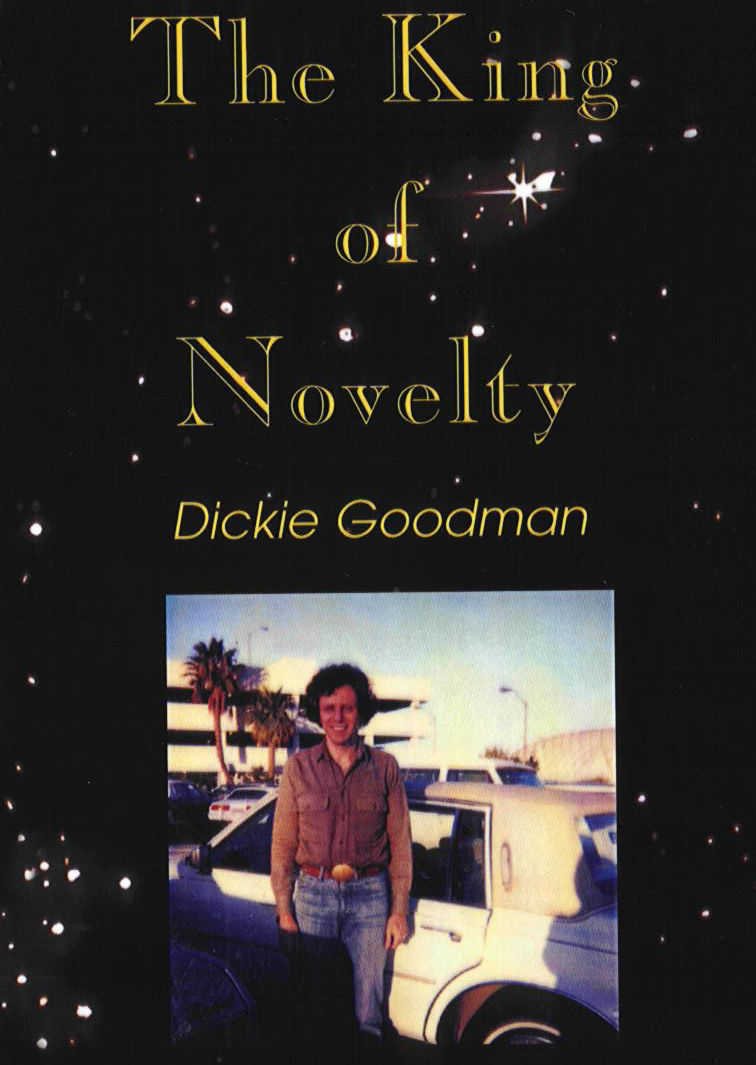
- Goodman on the cover of The King of Novelty by Jon Goodman

Background information
- Born: April 19, 1934; Brooklyn, New York, U.S.
- Died: November 6, 1989 (aged 55) North Carolina, U.S.
- Genres: Parody; break-in
- Occupations: Singer, songwriter, producer, comic
- Instrument: Spoken voice
- Years active: 1952–1988

Richard Dorian “Dickie” Goodman (April 19, 1934 – November 6, 1989) was an American musician and record producer. He is best known for inventing and using the technique of the "break-in", an early precursor to sampling, that used brief clips of popular records and songs to "answer" comedic questions posed by voice actors on his novelty records. He also wrote and produced some original material, most often heard on the B-sides of his break-in records.

== Career ==
In June 1956, in partnership with Bill Buchanan, Dickie Goodman made his first hit record, "The Flying Saucer Parts 1 & 2", a comedic take-off of Orson Welles' War of the Worlds. This recording was the subject of a copyright infringement case against Goodman. The court ruled that his sampled mix was a parody and thus an entirely new work. The single peaked at No. 3 on Billboard and was Goodman's highest-charting single.

Much of the success of this first hit came from being played by Alan Freed and Jack Lacy on New York radio with distribution quickly picked up by Roulette Records. Since Part 2 was on the B side of the vinyl record, Disc Jockeys had to flip the record over to complete the broadcast of the two tracks. Hence the recording(s) best known as simply, "The Flying Saucer."

Buchanan and Goodman followed up with other records. "Buchanan and Goodman on Trial", satirized the court case, and reached #80 in 1956. "Banana Boat Story" featured the duo using a song, the Tarriers' "Banana Boat Song", as a break-in spoof of broadcast commercials. "Flying Saucer the 2nd" reached #18 in 1957, "Santa and the Satellite (Parts I & II)" reached #32 in 1957, and "Frankenstein Of `59" / "Frankenstein Returns" was released in February 1959. After which the two men ended their partnership. They had operated their business from a telephone booth at a pharmacy. Although they got richer, the court cases ate up the profits.

In 1959, collaborating with Mickey Shorr under the names Spencer and Spencer, Goodman recorded two singles which relied much less on sampling and more on sketch comedy. "Russian Bandstand" was a re-imagining of the TV series American Bandstand set in the Soviet Union. "Stagger Lawrence" imposed Lloyd Price's recording of "Stagger Lee" onto a spoof of The Lawrence Welk Show, borrowing heavily from an earlier Welk parody done by Stan Freberg. Neither recording was as popular as the recordings Goodman made with Buchanan.

Starting in 1961 as a solo artist, Dickie Goodman scored three Billboard Hot 100 hits based on the hit TV series The Untouchables: "The Touchables" (#60), "The Touchables in Brooklyn" (#42), and "Santa and the Touchables" (#99). He also performed several of his own Halloween-themed songs with Rori; eventually these were released as an album, the most successful track being "Horror Movies", about favorite pop culture movie monsters. The song has recently been revived as background music in several films and venues, including Adam Sandler's Hubie Halloween on Netflix, Amazon Prime series The Lake, Disney/HULU series Extraordinary and Universal Orlando's Halloween Nights.

In 1962, Goodman spoofed Ben Casey with "Ben Crazy" (#44 on Billboard). In 1966, his spoof of Batman resulted in "Batman & His Grandmother" (#70). He also released a full album, The Many Heads Of Dickie Goodman, which included most of his break-ins to date.

In 1963 while heading the music department at 20th Century Fox, Goodman recorded (John F Kennedy The Presidential Years), a tribute album composed of Kennedy's famous speeches, rapidly put together on news of the assassination. It was named number eight of Billboard's "Albums of the Year." and has been archived by The Henry Ford Museum.

In 1964, Goodman switched from break-in records to parodies and recorded an album called My Son the Joke. The title was a take-off of Allan Sherman popular comedy records. Goodman's material was more risque than Sherman's, with such songs as "Harry's Jockstrap", featuring his wife Susan, to the tune of "Frère Jacques"). The album failed to chart.

In the late 1960s, Goodman recorded a mostly musical album featuring his wife, entitled Dickie Goodman and His Wife Susan. Goodman sang on one track on the record, "Never Play Poker with a Man Named Doc (or Eat at a Place Called Mom's)", paraphrasing Nelson Algren's novel A Walk on the Wild Side). He produced two break-in style pieces and his wife sang the rest of the songs.

In 1969, Goodman parodied the political unrest on college campuses with "On Campus" (#45 on Billboard) and the first Moon landing with "Luna Trip" (#95). Vik Venus's "Moonflight", which imitated Goodman's break-in style, reached #38 on 9 August 1969, much higher than "On Campus" one week after the latter peaked. Goodman's records also inspired KQV morning disc jockey Bob DeCarlo's top 10 hit "Convention '72" under the name the Delegates. Goodman himself spoofed political issues such as the Watergate scandal with "Watergrate" (#42 in 1973), the energy crisis with "Energy Crisis '74" (#33 in 1974), and Richard Nixon with "Mr. President" (#73 in 1974). Goodman released a different version of "Mr. President" in 1981 after Ronald Reagan became president, but this recording did not chart.

Goodman also produced recordings for other acts. John & Ernest's "Superfly Meets Shaft" (#31 in 1973), which became a crossover hit from R&B radio and retained Goodman's "break-in" format. He created the Glass Bottle, a pop band, primarily as an advertising ploy to promote glass bottles, which soda companies were replacing with plastic bottles. The Glass Bottle recorded two singles, both straight pop songs; one of them, "I Ain't Got Time Anymore", hit #36 in 1971. He also released a novelty record for environmental activism, "Speaking of Ecology" in 1971. In 1974, Goodman anonymously released Screwy T.V., an album of risque parodies of then-popular TV shows. This album proved less popular than My Son the Joke.

In 1975, Goodman parodied the film Jaws with "Mr. Jaws" (#4 on Billboard). It was his biggest-selling record, earning a R.I.A.A. gold record in September 1975. The record shot to No. 1 on 11 October 1975 on Chicago's WLS, who played a customized version featuring "This is Dickie Goodman at WLS ..." at the beginning. "Mr. Jaws" also charted in the Top Ten in Great Britain and won a Juno Award in Canada.

Goodman's final chart record was "Kong" (#48 on Billboard in 1977), a spoof of the 1976 remake of King Kong. It was followed by others that failed to make the Top 100. "Hey ET", based on Spielberg's movie E.T. the Extraterrestrial, was Dickie Goodman's last release to reach Billboard's Bubbling Under chart (Top 200). Altogether, Goodman charted seventeen hits, with five of them reaching the top 40. Joel Whitburn's Top Pop Singles listed Dickie Goodman's Billboard ranking at #1 (17 in the Top 100) for Comedy, and Guinness World Records certified him for the most charted comedy hits (seventeen) on Billboard. Goodman produced several other break-in records which garnered airplay and charted only in a few regions, including Los Angeles and New York City.

Luniverse, Goodman's record label, also featured works by other artists, including the Del-Vikings. Among his other labels were Eldorado (mostly used for singers like Joann Campbell), All Star (also used for singers and bands), Novelty, Comic, Cash, Rainy Wednesday, Oron, Ramgo (created with his new partner, Bill Ramal), M.D., JMD, Shark, Wacko, Extran and Goodname.

Goodman's break-in records were themselves spoofed by Albert Brooks in a comedy bit called "Party from Outer Space."

In 2001 Dickie Goodman was awarded a posthumous GRAMMY award from NARAS for his original hit, The Flying Saucer Pt. 1 and Pt. 2 thanks to its inclusion by RHINO Records on Brain In A Box: The Science Fiction Collection.

== Death ==
Goodman died in North Carolina from a self-inflicted gunshot wound. He had three children: sons Jon and Jed, and a daughter, Jane. In 2000, Jon released The King of Novelty, a biography of Dickie's life and work. The book also contains the most comprehensive chronology of Dickie Goodman's records and their samples. The entire repertoire is available from Jon Goodman Publishing on all of the major music download and streaming sites.

== Discography ==
=== As Buchanan and Goodman ===
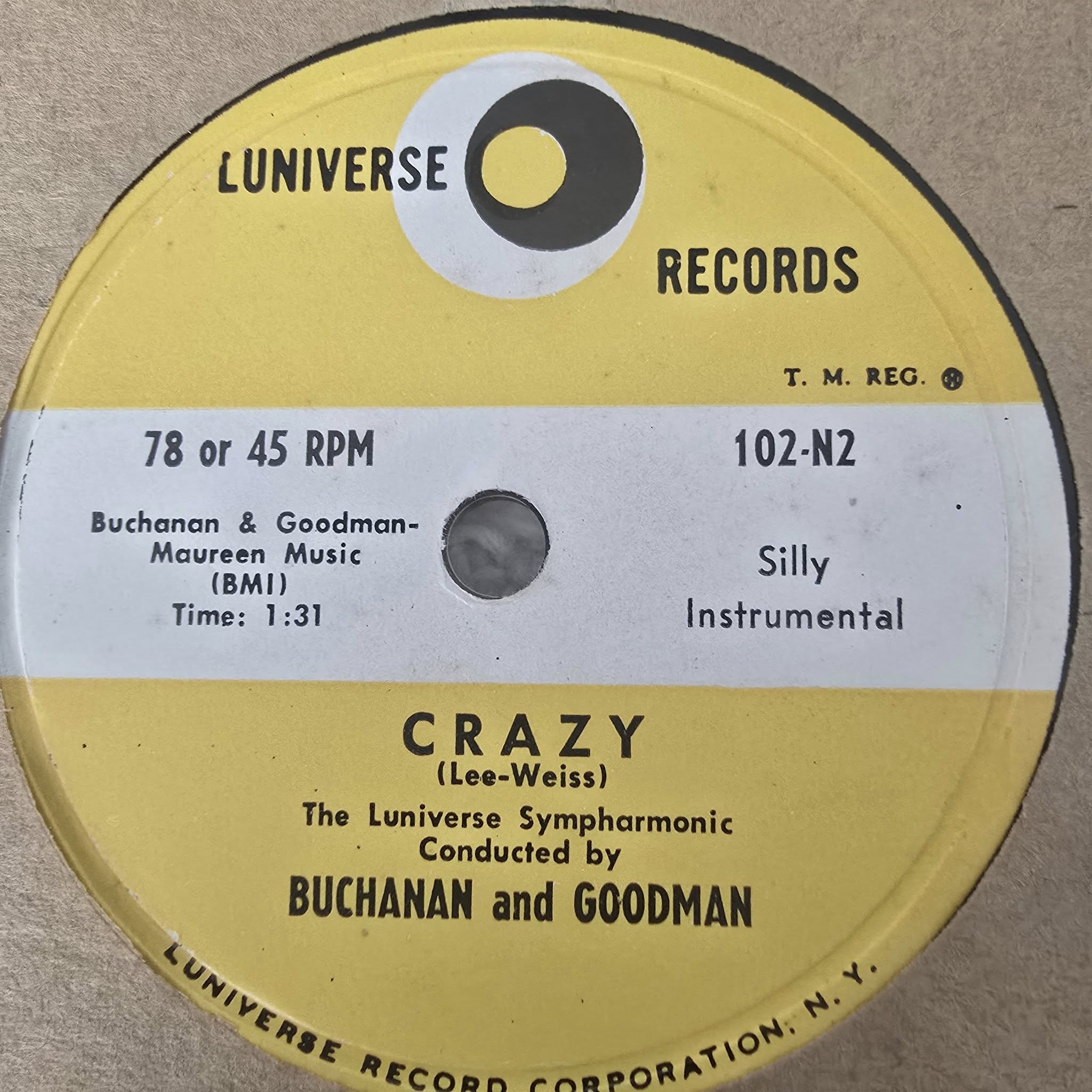
The label of Crazy by Buchanan and Goodman says that it is to be played at "78 or 45 RPM"

Date	Record title	Billboard chart peak
July 25, 1956	"The Flying Saucer Part 1 / "The Flying Saucer Part 2"	3
November 7, 1956	"Buchanan & Goodman on Trial" / "Crazy"	80
	"The Banana Boat Story" / "Mystery (In Slow-Motion)"	—
July 13, 1957	"Flying Saucer the 2nd" / "Martian Melody"	18
December 14, 1957	"Santa and the Satellite"	32
1958	"The Flying Saucer Goes West" / "Saucer Serenade"	—
1959	"Flying Saucer the Third" / "The Cha Cha Lesson"	—
1959	"Frankenstein of '59" / "Frankenstein Returns"	—

==== As Spencer and Spencer ====
Date	Record title	Billboard chart peak
March 1959	"Stagger Lawrence" / "Stroganoff Cha Cha"	—
May 18, 1959	"Russian Bandstand" / "Brass Wail"	91

==== Solo ====
- I Really Wanted to Be a "Singar" / Young and Foolish — Rori 714 — 1964; written and produced by Buchanan & Goodman
- The Ride of Paul Revere — 1960?
- Paul Revere / Oh Susanna Rock — Strand 25002 — 1960 version, Goodman recording under the name Val E. Forge
- Space Ship / We Belong Together — Novel N-200 — 1960; Goodman sang on this record
- The Touchables (#60) / Martian Melody — Mark-X 8009 — 2/26/61
- The Touchables in Brooklyn (#42) / Mystery — Mark-X 8010 — 4/30/61
- Horror Movies / Whoa Mule — Rori 601 — 1961
- Berlin Top Ten (#116) / Little Tiger — Rori 602—10/23/61
- Santa & the Touchables (#99) / North Pole Rock — Rori 701 — 12/31/61
- Ben Crazy (#44) / Flip Side — JMD RX-001 / Diamond D-119 — 7/62
- Senate Hearing (#116) / Lock Up – 20th Century Records 443 — 11/2/63
- Paul Revere — Rori 712 — 1964
- My Son the Joke – Comet CLP-69 — 1964; risque nightclub music LP
- My Baby Loves Monster Movies / Theme from a Whodunit – DCP International 1111 — 10/3/64
- Presidential Interview (Flying Saucer '64) / Paul Revere — Audio Spectrum 75 — 10/1964
- The Invasion/What a Lovely Party (8/11/1964)
- Frankenstein Meets the Beatles / Dracula Drag – DCP International 1126 — 12/12/64
- Schmonanza / Backwards Theme — M.D. 101 — 3/1/65
- James Bomb / Seventh Theme — Twirl 2015 — 1965
- Never Play Poker with a Man Named Doc or Eat at a Place Called Mom's – 1966; sung by Goodman; produced by Goodman and/or Buchanan
- Batman & His Grandmother (#70) / Suspense – Red Bird 10-058 — 5/28/66
- Congressional Medal of Honor (sung by Susan Smith Goodman) – 1968
- The Space Girl / Very Interesting – Roulette R-7020 — 9/68
- Washington Uptight / The Cat — Oron 101 — late 1968
- The Modify / Live a Little – Capitol 2407 — 4/17/69; Goodman wrote, produced, and sang
- On Campus (#45) / Mombo Suzie—Cotique 158 — 6/28/69
- Luna Trip (#95) / My Victrola—Cotique 173 — 9/6/69
- Things — 1971
- Speaking of Ecology / Dayton's Theme — Ramgo 501 / Scepter 12339 — 7/71
- Watergrate (#42) / Friends — Rainy Wednesday 202—6/16/73
- Purple People Eater (#119) / Ruthie's Theme — Rainy Wednesday 204 — 9/15/73
- The Constitution / The End — Rainy Wednesday 205 — late 1973
- Energy Crisis '74 (#33) / The Mistake — Rainy Wednesday 206 — 2/74
- Screwy T.V. – Funko 1001 LP – 1974; Goodman's adult humor parody and impersonations of popular TV shows.
- Mr. President (#73) / Popularity — Rainy Wednesday 207 — 6/15/74
- Gerry Ford (A Special Report) / Robert — Rainy Wednesday 208 — late 1974
- Inflation in the Nation / Jon & Jed's Theme — Rainy Wednesday 209 — 1975
- Mr. Jaws (#4) / Irv's Theme — Cash 451 — 9/6/75
- Kong (#48) / Ed's Tune — Shock 6 – 2/5/77
- Just Released — Tsuaris — 1977
- Star Warts / The Boys' Tune — Janus 271 — summer 1977
- Mrs. Jaws / Chomp Chomp — Shark 1001 — summer 1978
- Super, Superman / Chomp Chomp — Shark 1002 — early 1979
- Energy Crisis '79 / Pain — Hot Line 1017 — summer 1979
- Election '80 – Prelude — fall 1980
- Mr. President / Dancin' U.S.A. – Wacko 1001 — spring 1981
- The Monster Album – studio unknown – 1980s
- Super-Duper Man / Robert's Tune — Wacko 1002 — summer 1981
- America '81 (Short Version) / (Long Version) – Wacko 1381 — 1981
- Hey, E.T. / Get a Job — Extran 601/Montage P-B-1220 — fall 1982
- Hey Dickie! – no label — 1982
- Attack of the Z-Monster / Mystery — Z-100 — summer 1983
- Radio Russia / Washington Inside-Out – Rhino RNOR 019 — 11/83
- The Return of the Jedi Returns (Star Wars IV) – Rhino RNLP 811 — 11/83
- Election '84 / Herb's Theme — Shell 711—1984
- Safe Sex Report / Safety First — Goodname 100 — late 1987 / early 1988 (Goodman's final recording)

=== Produced by Goodman ===
- Please Won't You Call Me / Why Should We Break Up — Herald 477 — 1956; produced by Goodman
- Forever Young / Come On Baby—Eldorado 504–1956; A-side written by Goodman; both sides produced by him and his partner, Bill Buchanan
- Invisible Thing / Some Other Fellow—Luniverse 109 — 1958; written and produced by Goodman
- Class Room / Fake Out—ABC-Paramount 45-9963 — 11/2/58; A-side was written and produced by Goodman
- John Fitzgerald Kennedy: The Presidential Years, 1960 – 1963 — 20th Century TFM 3127 — 12/61 – 1/64 (Goodman was president at 20th Century Records at the time and released this album immediately after Kennedy's death.)
- Sarah Jane / St. Marks & Third (sung by Susan Smith Goodman) – Bang 569 — 7/7/69
- The Saxophone Circus! – Avco Embassy AVE 33002 — 1969; produced by Goodman
- Coffee, Tea or Cuba / Ode to a Hijacker — Slew 451 — 1971; produced and written by Goodman
- The Glass Bottle – Avco Embassy AVE-33012 — 1970; produced by Ramal and Goodman
- The Glass Bottle – I Ain't Got Time Anymore (#36) / Things – Avco AVE-4575 — 7/7/71
- Because She's Mine Again / The Girl Who Loved Me When – Avco Embassy AV-4584—1971; produced by Goodman
- Superfly Meets Shaft (#31)/ Part Two — Rainy Wednesday 201 — 4/14/73; written and produced by Goodman
- Soul President Number One / Crossover — Rainy Wednesday 203 — 2/73; written and produced by Goodman; B-side same as "Friends" (see above)
