= List of number-one singles in Australia during the 1950s =

Australian number-one singles of the 1950s < 1940s 1960s >

Australian top 25 singles
- 1950 1951 1952 1953 1954; 1955 1956 1957 1958 1959

Australian top 25 albums
- 1950 1951 1952 1953 1954; 1955 1956 1957 1958 1959

The following lists the number one singles on the Australian Singles Chart during the 1950s.

The source for this decade is the "Kent Music Report". These charts were calculated in the 1990s in retrospect, by David Kent, using archival data.

Note: during the 1950s, often more than one version of a particular song by different artists charted at the same time, thus more than one artist may be listed for a song. Different versions are separated by a semi-colon.

Note The decade's best charting single was The Harry Lime Theme by Anton Karas, although it only peaked at #3 in the Single charts.

Key
The yellow background indicates the #1 song on the KMR End of Year Chart
The light blue background indicates the #1 song on the KMR End of Decade Chart

== 1950 ==
Date	Artist	Single	Weeks at number one
7 January	Burl Ives; Dinah Shore	"Lavender Blue (Dilly Dilly)"	6 weeks (2 weeks in 1949)
14 January	Burl Ives; Dinah Shore	"Lavender Blue (Dilly Dilly)"	6 weeks (2 weeks in 1949)
21 January	Burl Ives; Dinah Shore	"Lavender Blue (Dilly Dilly)"	6 weeks (2 weeks in 1949)
28 January	Burl Ives; Dinah Shore	"Lavender Blue (Dilly Dilly)"	6 weeks (2 weeks in 1949)
4 February	Perry Como & The Fontane Sisters; Tony Pastor	""A" You're Adorable"	4 weeks
11 February	Perry Como & The Fontane Sisters; Tony Pastor	""A" You're Adorable"	4 weeks
18 February	Perry Como & The Fontane Sisters; Tony Pastor	""A" You're Adorable"	4 weeks
25 February	Perry Como & The Fontane Sisters; Tony Pastor	""A" You're Adorable"	4 weeks
4 March	Perry Como; Russ Morgan	"Forever And Ever"'	3 weeks
11 March	Perry Como; Russ Morgan	"Forever And Ever"'	3 weeks
18 March	Perry Como; Russ Morgan	"Forever And Ever"'	3 weeks
25 March	Bing Crosby; Sammy Kaye	"The Four Winds and the Seven Seas"	3 weeks
1 April	Bing Crosby; Sammy Kaye	"The Four Winds and the Seven Seas"	3 weeks
8 April	Bing Crosby; Sammy Kaye	"The Four Winds and the Seven Seas"	3 weeks
15 April	Freddy Martin; Danny Kaye	"I've Got a Lovely Bunch of Coconuts"	3 weeks
22 April	Freddy Martin; Danny Kaye	"I've Got a Lovely Bunch of Coconuts"	3 weeks
29 April	Freddy Martin; Danny Kaye	"I've Got a Lovely Bunch of Coconuts"	3 weeks
6 May	Buddy Clark; Vic Damone	"You're Breaking My Heart"	3 weeks
13 May	Buddy Clark; Vic Damone	"You're Breaking My Heart"	3 weeks
20 May	Buddy Clark; Vic Damone	"You're Breaking My Heart"	3 weeks
27 May	Guy Lombardo; Art Mooney; Gene Rayburn	"Hop Scotch Polka"	2 weeks
3 June	Guy Lombardo; Art Mooney; Gene Rayburn	"Hop Scotch Polka"	2 weeks
10 June	Donald Peers	"I Told Them All About You"	2 weeks
17 June	Donald Peers	"I Told Them All About You"	2 weeks
24 June	Donald Peers; Freddy Martin; Teresa Brewer	"Music! Music! Music!"	7 weeks
1 July	Donald Peers; Freddy Martin; Teresa Brewer	"Music! Music! Music!"	7 weeks
8 July	Donald Peers; Freddy Martin; Teresa Brewer	"Music! Music! Music!"	7 weeks
15 July	Donald Peers; Freddy Martin; Teresa Brewer	"Music! Music! Music!"	7 weeks
22 July	Donald Peers; Freddy Martin; Teresa Brewer	"Music! Music! Music!"	7 weeks
29 July	Donald Peers; Freddy Martin; Teresa Brewer	"Music! Music! Music!"	7 weeks
5 August	Donald Peers; Freddy Martin; Teresa Brewer	"Music! Music! Music!"	7 weeks
12 August	Gordon Jenkins; Joe Loss	"My Foolish Heart"	4 weeks
19 August	Gordon Jenkins; Joe Loss	"My Foolish Heart"	4 weeks
26 August	Gordon Jenkins; Joe Loss	"My Foolish Heart"	4 weeks
2 September	Gordon Jenkins; Joe Loss	"My Foolish Heart"	4 weeks
9 September	Bing Crosby & The Andrews Sisters	"Quicksilver"	8 weeks
16 September	Bing Crosby & The Andrews Sisters	"Quicksilver"	8 weeks
23 September	Bing Crosby & The Andrews Sisters	"Quicksilver"	8 weeks
30 September	Bing Crosby & The Andrews Sisters	"Quicksilver"	8 weeks
7 October	Bing Crosby & The Andrews Sisters	"Quicksilver"	8 weeks
14 October	Bing Crosby & The Andrews Sisters	"Quicksilver"	8 weeks
21 October	Bing Crosby & The Andrews Sisters	"Quicksilver"	8 weeks
28 October	Bing Crosby & The Andrews Sisters	"Quicksilver"	8 weeks
4 November	Sammy Kaye	"Hollywood Square Dance"	1 week
11 November	Dennis Day; Nat "King" Cole	"Mona Lisa"	5 weeks
18 November	Dennis Day; Nat "King" Cole	"Mona Lisa"	5 weeks
25 November	Dennis Day; Nat "King" Cole	"Mona Lisa"	5 weeks
2 December	Dennis Day; Nat "King" Cole	"Mona Lisa"	5 weeks
9 December	Dennis Day; Nat "King" Cole	"Mona Lisa"	5 weeks
16 December	Gordon Jenkins & The Weavers	"Goodnight Irene"	6 weeks
23 December	Gordon Jenkins & The Weavers	"Goodnight Irene"	6 weeks
30 December	Gordon Jenkins & The Weavers	"Goodnight Irene"	6 weeks

== 1951 ==
Date	Artist	Single	Weeks at number one
6 January	Gordon Jenkins & The Weavers	"Goodnight Irene"	6 weeks
13 January	Gordon Jenkins & The Weavers	"Goodnight Irene"	6 weeks
20 January	Gordon Jenkins & The Weavers	"Goodnight Irene"	6 weeks
27 January	Gordon Jenkins; Doris Day	"Bewitched"	5 weeks
3 February	Gordon Jenkins; Doris Day	"Bewitched"	5 weeks
10 February	Gordon Jenkins; Doris Day	"Bewitched"	5 weeks
17 February	Gordon Jenkins; Doris Day	"Bewitched"	5 weeks
24 February	Gordon Jenkins; Doris Day	"Bewitched"	5 weeks
3 March	Phil Harris; Les Welch	"The Thing"	3 weeks
10 March	Phil Harris; Les Welch	"The Thing"	3 weeks
17 March	Phil Harris; Les Welch	"The Thing"	3 weeks
24 March	Art Mooney	"Silver Dollar"	2 weeks
31 March	Art Mooney	"Silver Dollar"	2 weeks
7 April	Bing Crosby; Patti Page	"All My Love"	1 week
14 April	Paul Weston & The Norman Luboff Choir	"Nevertheless (I'm in Love with You)"	3 weeks
21 April	Paul Weston & The Norman Luboff Choir	"Nevertheless (I'm in Love with You)"	3 weeks
28 April	Paul Weston & The Norman Luboff Choir	"Nevertheless (I'm in Love with You)"	3 weeks
5 May	Pee Wee King; Gene Krupa	"Bonaparte's Retreat"	2 weeks
12 May	Pee Wee King; Gene Krupa	"Bonaparte's Retreat"	2 weeks
19 May	Pee Wee King; Patti Page	"Tennessee Waltz"	3 weeks
26 May	Pee Wee King; Patti Page	"Tennessee Waltz"	3 weeks
2 June	Pee Wee King; Patti Page	"Tennessee Waltz"	3 weeks
9 June	Danny Kaye & Patty Andrews; Nat "King" Cole	"Orange Coloured Sky"	1 week
16 June	Debbie Reynolds & Carleton Carpenter	"Aba Daba Honeymoon"	4 weeks
23 June	Debbie Reynolds & Carleton Carpenter	"Aba Daba Honeymoon"	4 weeks
30 June	Debbie Reynolds & Carleton Carpenter	"Aba Daba Honeymoon"	4 weeks
7 July	Debbie Reynolds & Carleton Carpenter	"Aba Daba Honeymoon"	4 weeks
14 July	Perry Como; Jo Stafford	"If (They Made Me a King)"	3 weeks
21 July	Perry Como; Jo Stafford	"If (They Made Me a King)"	3 weeks
28 July	Perry Como; Jo Stafford	"If (They Made Me a King)"	3 weeks
4 August	Guy Mitchell	"My Heart Cries For You"	4 weeks
11 August	Guy Mitchell	"My Heart Cries For You"	4 weeks
18 August	Guy Mitchell	"My Heart Cries For You"	4 weeks
25 August	Guy Mitchell	"My Heart Cries For You"	4 weeks
1 September	Donald Peers & Jim Gussey	"Mockin' Bird Hill"	1 week
8 September	Nat "King" Cole; Toni Arden	"Too Young"	9 weeks
15 September	Nat "King" Cole; Toni Arden	"Too Young"	9 weeks
22 September	Nat "King" Cole; Toni Arden	"Too Young"	9 weeks
29 September	Nat "King" Cole; Toni Arden	"Too Young"	9 weeks
6 October	Nat "King" Cole; Toni Arden	"Too Young"	9 weeks
13 October	Nat "King" Cole; Toni Arden	"Too Young"	9 weeks
20 October	Nat "King" Cole; Toni Arden	"Too Young"	9 weeks
27 October	Nat "King" Cole; Toni Arden	"Too Young"	9 weeks
3 November	Nat "King" Cole; Toni Arden	"Too Young"	9 weeks
10 November	Mario Lanza; Ann Blyth	"The Loveliest Night of the Year"	2 weeks
17 November	Mario Lanza; Ann Blyth	"The Loveliest Night of the Year"	2 weeks
24 November	Guy Mitchell; Donald Peers	"My Truly, Truly Fair"	4 weeks
1 December	Guy Mitchell; Donald Peers	"My Truly, Truly Fair"	4 weeks
8 December	Guy Mitchell; Donald Peers	"My Truly, Truly Fair"	4 weeks
15 December	Guy Mitchell; Donald Peers	"My Truly, Truly Fair"	4 weeks
22 December	Dinah Shore; Jane Turzy	"Sweet Violets"	4 weeks
29 December	Dinah Shore; Jane Turzy	"Sweet Violets"	4 weeks

== 1952 ==
Date	Artist	Single	Weeks at number one
5 January	Dinah Shore; Jane Turzy	"Sweet Violets"	4 weeks
12 January	Dinah Shore; Jane Turzy	"Sweet Violets"	4 weeks
19 January	Tony Bennett	"Because of You"	6 weeks
26 January	Tony Bennett	"Because of You"	6 weeks
2 February	Tony Bennett	"Because of You"	6 weeks
9 February	Tony Bennett	"Because of You"	6 weeks
16 February	Tony Bennett	"Because of You"	6 weeks
23 February	Tony Bennett	"Because of You"	6 weeks
1 March	Tony Bennett	"Cold, Cold Heart"	2 weeks
8 March	Tony Bennett	"Cold, Cold Heart"	2 weeks
15 March	Louis Armstrong	"A Kiss to Build a Dream On"	6 weeks
22 March	Louis Armstrong	"A Kiss to Build a Dream On"	6 weeks
29 March	Louis Armstrong	"A Kiss to Build a Dream On"	6 weeks
5 April	Louis Armstrong	"A Kiss to Build a Dream On"	6 weeks
12 April	Louis Armstrong	"A Kiss to Build a Dream On"	6 weeks
19 April	Louis Armstrong	"A Kiss to Build a Dream On"	6 weeks
26 April	Champ Butler; Joe "Fingers" Carr	"Down Yonder"	2 weeks
3 May	Champ Butler; Joe "Fingers" Carr	"Down Yonder"	2 weeks
10 May	Pee Wee King	"Slow Coach (Slow Poke)"	5 weeks
17 May	Pee Wee King	"Slow Coach (Slow Poke)"	5 weeks
24 May	Pee Wee King	"Slow Coach (Slow Poke)"	5 weeks
31 May	Pee Wee King	"Slow Coach (Slow Poke)"	5 weeks
7 June	Pee Wee King	"Slow Coach (Slow Poke)"	5 weeks
14 June	Johnnie Ray	"Cry"	5 weeks
21 June	Johnnie Ray	"Cry"	5 weeks
28 June	Johnnie Ray	"Cry"	5 weeks
5 July	Johnnie Ray	"Cry"	5 weeks
12 July	Johnnie Ray	"Cry"	5 weeks
19 July	Eddie Fisher; The Four Aces	"Tell Me Why"	2 weeks
26 July	Eddie Fisher; The Four Aces	"Tell Me Why"	2 weeks
2 August	Eddie Fisher	"Anytime"	3 weeks
9 August	Eddie Fisher	"Anytime"	3 weeks
16 August	Eddie Fisher	"Anytime"	3 weeks
23 August	The Weavers; Les Welch	"Ay-Round the Corner"	4 weeks
30 August	The Weavers; Les Welch	"Ay-Round the Corner"	4 weeks
6 September	The Weavers; Les Welch	"Ay-Round the Corner"	4 weeks
13 September	The Weavers; Les Welch	"Ay-Round the Corner"	4 weeks
20 September	Johnnie Ray	"Walkin' My Baby Back Home"	2 weeks
27 September	Johnnie Ray	"Walkin' My Baby Back Home"	2 weeks
4 October	Al Martino	"Here in My Heart"	4 weeks
11 October	Al Martino	"Here in My Heart"	4 weeks
18 October	Al Martino	"Here in My Heart"	4 weeks
25 October	Al Martino	"Here in My Heart"	4 weeks
1 November	Ezio Pinza; Bing Crosby	"Some Enchanted Evening"	3 weeks
8 November	Ezio Pinza; Bing Crosby	"Some Enchanted Evening"	3 weeks
15 November	Ezio Pinza; Bing Crosby	"Some Enchanted Evening"	3 weeks
22 November	Vera Lynn; Eddy Howard	"Auf Wiedersehen, Sweetheart"	7 weeks
29 November	Vera Lynn; Eddy Howard	"Auf Wiedersehen, Sweetheart"	7 weeks
6 December	Vera Lynn; Eddy Howard	"Auf Wiedersehen, Sweetheart"	7 weeks
13 December	Vera Lynn; Eddy Howard	"Auf Wiedersehen, Sweetheart"	7 weeks
20 December	Vera Lynn; Eddy Howard	"Auf Wiedersehen, Sweetheart"	7 weeks
27 December	Vera Lynn; Eddy Howard	"Auf Wiedersehen, Sweetheart"	7 weeks

== 1953 ==
Date	Artist	Single	Weeks at number one
3 January	Vera Lynn; Eddy Howard	"Auf Wiedersehen, Sweetheart"	7 weeks
10 January	Rosemary Clooney	"Half As Much"	1 week
17 January	Jo Stafford; Dean Martin	"You Belong to Me"	6 weeks
23 January	Jo Stafford; Dean Martin	"You Belong to Me"	6 weeks
31 January	Jo Stafford; Dean Martin	"You Belong to Me"	6 weeks
7 February	Jo Stafford; Dean Martin	"You Belong to Me"	6 weeks
14 February	Jo Stafford; Dean Martin	"You Belong to Me"	6 weeks
21 February	Jo Stafford; Dean Martin	"You Belong to Me"	6 weeks
28 February	Mario Lanza; Nat "King" Cole	"Because You're Mine"	2 weeks
7 March	Mario Lanza; Nat "King" Cole	"Because You're Mine"	2 weeks
14 March	Eddie Fisher; Winifred Atwell	"Lady of Spain"	2 weeks
21 March	Eddie Fisher; Winifred Atwell	"Lady of Spain"	2 weeks
28 March	Patti Page; Sammy Kaye	"I Went to Your Wedding"	4 weeks
4 April	Patti Page; Sammy Kaye	"I Went to Your Wedding"	4 weeks
11 April	Patti Page; Sammy Kaye	"I Went to Your Wedding"	4 weeks
18 April	Patti Page; Sammy Kaye	"I Went to Your Wedding"	4 weeks
25 April	Louis Armstrong; Pearl Bailey	"Takes Two to Tango"	2 weeks
2 May	Louis Armstrong; Pearl Bailey	"Takes Two to Tango"	2 weeks
9 May	Red Foley; Perry Como	"Don't Let the Stars Get in Your Eyes"	2 weeks
16 May	Red Foley; Perry Como	"Don't Let the Stars Get in Your Eyes"	2 weeks
23 May	Teresa Brewer	"Till I Waltz Again With You"	5 weeks
30 May	Teresa Brewer	"Till I Waltz Again With You"	5 weeks
6 June	Teresa Brewer	"Till I Waltz Again With You"	5 weeks
13 June	Dinah Shore	"Hi-Lili Hi-Lo"	1 week
20 June	Teresa Brewer	"Till I Waltz Again With You"	5 weeks
27 June	Teresa Brewer	"Till I Waltz Again With You"	5 weeks
4 July	Ethel Merman & Dick Haymes; Perry Como & The Fontane Sisters	"You're Just in Love"	2 weeks
11 July	Ethel Merman & Dick Haymes; Perry Como & The Fontane Sisters	"You're Just in Love"	2 weeks
18 July	Lawrence Welk; The Four Knights	"Oh Happy Day"	1 week
25 July	Frankie Laine & Jimmy Boyd	"Tell Me a Story"	2 weeks
1 August	Frankie Laine & Jimmy Boyd	"Tell Me a Story"	2 weeks
8 August	Patti Page	"(How Much Is) That Doggie in the Window?"	2 weeks
15 August	Patti Page	"(How Much Is) That Doggie in the Window?"	2 weeks
22 August	Percy Faith	"The Song from Moulin Rouge (Where Is Your Heart?)"	6 weeks
29 August	Percy Faith	"The Song from Moulin Rouge (Where Is Your Heart?)"	6 weeks
5 September	Percy Faith	"The Song from Moulin Rouge (Where Is Your Heart?)"	6 weeks
12 September	Percy Faith	"The Song from Moulin Rouge (Where Is Your Heart?)"	6 weeks
19 September	Percy Faith	"The Song from Moulin Rouge (Where Is Your Heart?)"	6 weeks
26 September	Percy Faith	"The Song from Moulin Rouge (Where Is Your Heart?)"	6 weeks
3 October	Frank Chacksfield	"Terry's Theme from "Limelight" (Eternally)"	1 week
10 October	Frank Sinatra; Eddie Fisher	"I'm Walking Behind You"	4 weeks
17 October	Frank Sinatra; Eddie Fisher	"I'm Walking Behind You"	4 weeks
24 October	Frank Sinatra; Eddie Fisher	"I'm Walking Behind You"	4 weeks
31 October	Frank Sinatra; Eddie Fisher	"I'm Walking Behind You"	4 weeks
7 November	Les Paul & Mary Ford	"Vaya con Dios"	4 weeks
14 November	Les Paul & Mary Ford	"Vaya con Dios"	4 weeks
21 November	Les Paul & Mary Ford	"Vaya con Dios"	4 weeks
28 November	Les Paul & Mary Ford	"Vaya con Dios"	4 weeks
5 December	Silvana Mangano	"Anna (The Baion)"	1 week
12 December	Jimmy Boyd	"I Saw Mommy Kissing Santa Claus"	3 weeks
19 December	Jimmy Boyd	"I Saw Mommy Kissing Santa Claus"	3 weeks
26 December	Jimmy Boyd	"I Saw Mommy Kissing Santa Claus"	3 weeks

== 1954 ==
Date	Artist	Single	Weeks at number one
2 January	Nat "King" Cole	"Pretend"	7 weeks
9 January	Nat "King" Cole	"Pretend"	7 weeks
16 January	Nat "King" Cole	"Pretend"	7 weeks
23 January	Nat "King" Cole	"Pretend"	7 weeks
30 January	Nat "King" Cole	"Pretend"	7 weeks
6 February	Nat "King" Cole	"Pretend"	7 weeks
13 February	Nat "King" Cole	"Pretend"	7 weeks
20 February	The Ames Brothers	"You, You, You"	1 week
27 February	Tony Bennett	"Rags to Riches"	5 weeks
6 March	Tony Bennett	"Rags to Riches"	5 weeks
13 March	Tony Bennett	"Rags to Riches"	5 weeks
20 March	Tony Bennett	"Rags to Riches"	5 weeks
27 March	Tony Bennett	"Rags to Riches"	5 weeks
3 April	Frank Chacksfield	"Ebb Tide"	2 weeks
10 April	Frank Chacksfield	"Ebb Tide"	2 weeks
17 April	Dean Martin	"That's Amore"	3 weeks
24 April	Dean Martin	"That's Amore"	3 weeks
1 May	Dean Martin	"That's Amore"	3 weeks
8 May	Eddie Fisher	"Oh My Pa-Pa (O Mein Papa)"	4 weeks
15 May	Eddie Fisher	"Oh My Pa-Pa (O Mein Papa)"	4 weeks
22 May	Eddie Fisher	"Oh My Pa-Pa (O Mein Papa)"	4 weeks
29 May	Eddie Fisher	"Oh My Pa-Pa (O Mein Papa)"	4 weeks
5 June	Nat "King" Cole; Frankie Laine	"Answer Me, My Love" "Answer Me, Lord Above"	4 weeks
12 June	Nat "King" Cole; Frankie Laine	"Answer Me, My Love" "Answer Me, Lord Above"	4 weeks
19 June	Nat "King" Cole; Frankie Laine	"Answer Me, My Love" "Answer Me, Lord Above"	4 weeks
26 June	Nat "King" Cole; Frankie Laine	"Answer Me, My Love" "Answer Me, Lord Above"	4 weeks
3 July	Frank Sinatra	"Young at Heart"	3 weeks
10 July	Frank Sinatra	"Young at Heart"	3 weeks
17 July	Frank Sinatra	"Young at Heart"	3 weeks
24 July	Perry Como	"Wanted"	1 weeks
31 July	Frank Weir; Obernkirchen Children's Choir	"The Happy Wanderer"	8 weeks
7 August	Frank Weir; Obernkirchen Children's Choir	"The Happy Wanderer"	8 weeks
14 August	Frank Weir; Obernkirchen Children's Choir	"The Happy Wanderer"	8 weeks
21 August	Frank Weir; Obernkirchen Children's Choir	"The Happy Wanderer"	8 weeks
28 August	Frank Weir; Obernkirchen Children's Choir	"The Happy Wanderer"	8 weeks
4 September	Frank Weir; Obernkirchen Children's Choir	"The Happy Wanderer"	8 weeks
11 September	Frank Weir; Obernkirchen Children's Choir	"The Happy Wanderer"	8 weeks
18 September	Frank Weir; Obernkirchen Children's Choir	"The Happy Wanderer"	8 weeks
25 September	Frank Sinatra; The Four Aces	"Three Coins in the Fountain"	2 weeks
2 October	Frank Sinatra; The Four Aces	"Three Coins in the Fountain"	2 weeks
9 October	The Gaylords; Petula Clark	"The Little Shoemaker"	2 weeks
16 October	The Gaylords; Petula Clark	"The Little Shoemaker"	2 weeks
23 October	Kitty Kallen	"Little Things Mean a Lot"	5 weeks
30 October	Kitty Kallen	"Little Things Mean a Lot"	5 weeks
6 November	Kitty Kallen	"Little Things Mean a Lot"	5 weeks
13 November	Kitty Kallen	"Little Things Mean a Lot"	5 weeks
20 November	Kitty Kallen	"Little Things Mean a Lot"	5 weeks
27 November	Dean Martin	"Sway"	1 week
4 December	The Crew Cuts	"Sh-Boom"	4 weeks
11 December	The Crew Cuts	"Sh-Boom"	4 weeks
18 December	The Crew Cuts	"Sh-Boom"	4 weeks
25 December	The Crew Cuts	"Sh-Boom"	4 weeks

== 1955 ==
Date	Artist	Single	Weeks at number one
1 January	The Four Lads	"Skokiaan"	2 weeks
8 January	The Four Lads	"Skokiaan"	2 weeks
15 January	Mario Lanza	"Serenade (From "The Student Prince")"	2 weeks
22 January	Mario Lanza	"Serenade (From "The Student Prince")"	2 weeks
29 January	Don Cornell; Nat "King" Cole	"Hold My Hand"	6 weeks
5 February	Don Cornell; Nat "King" Cole	"Hold My Hand"	6 weeks
12 February	Don Cornell; Nat "King" Cole	"Hold My Hand"	6 weeks
19 February	Don Cornell; Nat "King" Cole	"Hold My Hand"	6 weeks
26 February	Don Cornell; Nat "King" Cole	"Hold My Hand"	6 weeks
5 March	Don Cornell; Nat "King" Cole	"Hold My Hand"	6 weeks
12 March	Eddie Fisher	"I Need You Now"	3 weeks
19 March	Eddie Fisher	"I Need You Now"	3 weeks
26 March	Eddie Fisher	"I Need You Now"	3 weeks
2 April	The Four Aces; The Chordettes	"Mr Sandman"	4 weeks
9 April	The Four Aces; The Chordettes	"Mr Sandman"	4 weeks
16 April	The Four Aces; The Chordettes	"Mr Sandman"	4 weeks
23 April	The Four Aces; The Chordettes	"Mr Sandman"	4 weeks
30 April	Joan Weber; Teresa Brewer	"Let Me Go, Lover"	2 weeks
7 May	Joan Weber; Teresa Brewer	"Let Me Go, Lover"	2 weeks
14 May	Dean Martin; The Ames Brothers	"The Naughty Lady of Shady Lane"	2 weeks
21 May	Dean Martin; The Ames Brothers	"The Naughty Lady of Shady Lane"	2 weeks
28 May	The Four Aces; Billy Vaughn	"Melody of Love"	6 weeks
4 June	The Four Aces; Billy Vaughn	"Melody of Love"	6 weeks
11 June	The Four Aces; Billy Vaughn	"Melody of Love"	6 weeks
18 June	The Four Aces; Billy Vaughn	"Melody of Love"	6 weeks
25 June	The Four Aces; Billy Vaughn	"Melody of Love"	6 weeks
2 July	The Four Aces; Billy Vaughn	"Melody of Love"	6 weeks
9 July	Victor Young; Les Baxter	"The High and the Mighty"	3 weeks
16 July	Victor Young; Les Baxter	"The High and the Mighty"	3 weeks
23 July	Victor Young; Les Baxter	"The High and the Mighty"	3 weeks
30 July	Les Baxter; Perez Prado	"Cherry Pink and Apple Blossom White"	3 weeks
6 August	Les Baxter; Perez Prado	"Cherry Pink and Apple Blossom White"	3 weeks
13 August	Les Baxter; Perez Prado	"Cherry Pink and Apple Blossom White"	3 weeks
20 August	Bill Haley & His Comets	"Rock Around the Clock"	6 weeks
27 August	Bill Haley & His Comets	"Rock Around the Clock"	6 weeks
3 September	Bill Haley & His Comets	"Rock Around the Clock"	6 weeks
10 September	Bill Haley & His Comets	"Rock Around the Clock"	6 weeks
17 September	Bill Haley & His Comets	"Rock Around the Clock"	6 weeks
24 September	Bill Haley & His Comets	"Rock Around the Clock"	6 weeks
1 October	Darryl Stewart	"A Man Called Peter"	1 week
8 October	Al Hibbler; Les Baxter	"Unchained Melody"	5 weeks
15 October	Al Hibbler; Les Baxter	"Unchained Melody"	5 weeks
22 October	Al Hibbler; Les Baxter	"Unchained Melody"	5 weeks
29 October	Al Hibbler; Les Baxter	"Unchained Melody"	5 weeks
5 November	Al Hibbler; Les Baxter	"Unchained Melody"	5 weeks
12 November	Frank Sinatra	"Learnin' the Blues"	1 week
19 November	Tony Bennett	"Stranger in Paradise"	3 weeks
26 November	Tony Bennett	"Stranger in Paradise"	3 weeks
3 December	Tony Bennett	"Stranger in Paradise"	3 weeks
10 December	"Tennessee" Ernie Ford; Fess Parker	"The Ballad of Davy Crockett"	4 weeks
17 December	"Tennessee" Ernie Ford; Fess Parker	"The Ballad of Davy Crockett"	4 weeks
24 December	"Tennessee" Ernie Ford; Fess Parker	"The Ballad of Davy Crockett"	4 weeks
31 December	"Tennessee" Ernie Ford; Fess Parker	"The Ballad of Davy Crockett"	4 weeks

== 1956 ==
Date	Artist	Single	Weeks at number one
7 January	Mitch Miller	"The Yellow Rose of Texas"	6 weeks
14 January	Mitch Miller	"The Yellow Rose of Texas"	6 weeks
21 January	Mitch Miller	"The Yellow Rose of Texas"	6 weeks
28 January	Mitch Miller	"The Yellow Rose of Texas"	6 weeks
4 February	Mitch Miller	"The Yellow Rose of Texas"	6 weeks
11 February	Mitch Miller	"The Yellow Rose of Texas"	6 weeks
18 February	"Tennessee" Ernie Ford; Frankie Laine	"Sixteen Tons"	6 weeks
25 February	"Tennessee" Ernie Ford; Frankie Laine	"Sixteen Tons"	6 weeks
3 March	"Tennessee" Ernie Ford; Frankie Laine	"Sixteen Tons"	6 weeks
10 March	"Tennessee" Ernie Ford; Frankie Laine	"Sixteen Tons"	6 weeks
17 March	"Tennessee" Ernie Ford; Frankie Laine	"Sixteen Tons"	6 weeks
24 March	"Tennessee" Ernie Ford; Frankie Laine	"Sixteen Tons"	6 weeks
31 March	Al Hibbler	"He"	2 weeks
7 April	Al Hibbler	"He"	2 weeks
14 April	Dean Martin	"Memories Are Made of This"	5 weeks
21 April	Dean Martin	"Memories Are Made of This"	5 weeks
28 April	Dean Martin	"Memories Are Made of This"	5 weeks
5 May	Dean Martin	"Memories Are Made of This"	5 weeks
12 May	Dean Martin	"Memories Are Made of This"	5 weeks
19 May	Louis Armstrong	"Mack the Knife"	4 weeks
26 May	Louis Armstrong	"Mack the Knife"	4 weeks
2 June	Louis Armstrong	"Mack the Knife"	4 weeks
9 June	Louis Armstrong	"Mack the Knife"	4 weeks
16 June	Kay Starr	"The Rock and Roll Waltz"	5 weeks
23 June	Kay Starr	"The Rock and Roll Waltz"	5 weeks
30 June	Kay Starr	"The Rock and Roll Waltz"	5 weeks
7 July	Kay Starr	"The Rock and Roll Waltz"	5 weeks
14 July	Kay Starr	"The Rock and Roll Waltz"	5 weeks
21 July	The Platters	"The Great Pretender"	3 weeks
28 July	The Platters	"The Great Pretender"	3 weeks
4 August	The Platters	"The Great Pretender"	3 weeks
11 August	Les Baxter	"The Poor People of Paris"	1 week
18 August	Morris Stoloff	"Moonglow and Love Theme (from 'Picnic')"	1 week
25 August	Joe "Fingers" Carr	"Portuguese Washerwomen"	3 weeks
1 September	Joe "Fingers" Carr	"Portuguese Washerwomen"	3 weeks
8 September	Joe "Fingers" Carr	"Portuguese Washerwomen"	3 weeks
15 September	Doris Day	"Que Sera, Sera (Whatever Will Be, Will Be)"	8 weeks
22 September	Doris Day	"Que Sera, Sera (Whatever Will Be, Will Be)"	8 weeks
29 September	Doris Day	"Que Sera, Sera (Whatever Will Be, Will Be)"	8 weeks
6 October	Doris Day	"Que Sera, Sera (Whatever Will Be, Will Be)"	8 weeks
13 October	Doris Day	"Que Sera, Sera (Whatever Will Be, Will Be)"	8 weeks
20 October	Doris Day	"Que Sera, Sera (Whatever Will Be, Will Be)"	8 weeks
27 October	Doris Day	"Que Sera, Sera (Whatever Will Be, Will Be)"	8 weeks
3 November	Doris Day	"Que Sera, Sera (Whatever Will Be, Will Be)"	8 weeks
10 November	Perry Como	"Hot Diggity (Dog Ziggity Boom)"	4 weeks
17 November	Perry Como	"Hot Diggity (Dog Ziggity Boom)"	4 weeks
24 November	Perry Como	"Hot Diggity (Dog Ziggity Boom)"	4 weeks
1 December	Perry Como	"Hot Diggity (Dog Ziggity Boom)"	4 weeks
8 December	Johnnie Ray	"Just Walking in the Rain"	9 weeks
15 December	Johnnie Ray	"Just Walking in the Rain"	9 weeks
22 December	Johnnie Ray	"Just Walking in the Rain"	9 weeks
29 December	Johnnie Ray	"Just Walking in the Rain"	9 weeks

== 1957 ==
Date	Artist	Single	Weeks at number one
5 January	Johnnie Ray	"Just Walking in the Rain"	9 weeks
12 January	Johnnie Ray	"Just Walking in the Rain"	9 weeks
19 January	Johnnie Ray	"Just Walking in the Rain"	9 weeks
26 January	Johnnie Ray	"Just Walking in the Rain"	9 weeks
2 February	Johnnie Ray	"Just Walking in the Rain"	9 weeks
9 February	Rosemary Clooney	"Hey There"	4 weeks
16 February	Rosemary Clooney	"Hey There"	4 weeks
23 February	Rosemary Clooney	"Hey There"	4 weeks
2 March	Rosemary Clooney	"Hey There"	4 weeks
9 March	Guy Mitchell	"Singing the Blues"	6 weeks
16 March	Guy Mitchell	"Singing the Blues"	6 weeks
23 March	Guy Mitchell	"Singing the Blues"	6 weeks
30 March	Guy Mitchell	"Singing the Blues"	6 weeks
6 April	Guy Mitchell	"Singing the Blues"	6 weeks
13 April	Guy Mitchell	"Singing the Blues"	6 weeks
20 April	Eddie Fisher	"Cindy, Oh Cindy"	2 weeks
27 April	Eddie Fisher	"Cindy, Oh Cindy"	2 weeks
4 May	Tab Hunter; Sonny James	"Young Love"	3 weeks
11 May	Tab Hunter; Sonny James	"Young Love"	3 weeks
18 May	Tab Hunter; Sonny James	"Young Love"	3 weeks
25 May	Terry Gilkyson and The Easy Riders	"Marianne"	3 weeks
1 June	Terry Gilkyson and The Easy Riders	"Marianne"	3 weeks
8 June	Terry Gilkyson and The Easy Riders	"Marianne"	3 weeks
15 June	Jim Lowe	"Green Door"	1 week
22 June	Perry Como; The Four Lads	"Round and Round"	8 weeks
29 June	Perry Como; The Four Lads	"Round and Round"	8 weeks
6 July	Perry Como; The Four Lads	"Round and Round"	8 weeks
13 July	Perry Como; The Four Lads	"Round and Round"	8 weeks
20 July	Perry Como; The Four Lads	"Round and Round"	8 weeks
27 July	Perry Como; The Four Lads	"Round and Round"	8 weeks
3 August	Perry Como; The Four Lads	"Round and Round"	8 weeks
10 August	Perry Como; The Four Lads	"Round and Round"	8 weeks
17 August	Marty Robbins	"A White Sport Coat"	4 weeks
24 August	Marty Robbins	"A White Sport Coat"	4 weeks
31 August	Marty Robbins	"A White Sport Coat"	4 weeks
7 September	Marty Robbins	"A White Sport Coat"	4 weeks
14 September	Johnny Mathis	"Wonderful! Wonderful!"	1 week
21 September	Pat Boone	"Love Letters in the Sand"	5 weeks
28 September	Pat Boone	"Love Letters in the Sand"	5 weeks
5 October	Pat Boone	"Love Letters in the Sand"	5 weeks
12 October	Pat Boone	"Love Letters in the Sand"	5 weeks
19 October	Pat Boone	"Love Letters in the Sand"	5 weeks
26 October	Bing Crosby; Nat "King" Cole	"Around the World"	8 weeks
2 November	Bing Crosby; Nat "King" Cole	"Around the World"	8 weeks
9 November	Bing Crosby; Nat "King" Cole	"Around the World"	8 weeks
16 November	Bing Crosby; Nat "King" Cole	"Around the World"	8 weeks
23 November	Bing Crosby; Nat "King" Cole	"Around the World"	8 weeks
30 November	Bing Crosby; Nat "King" Cole	"Around the World"	8 weeks
7 December	Bing Crosby; Nat "King" Cole	"Around the World"	8 weeks
14 December	Bing Crosby; Nat "King" Cole	"Around the World"	8 weeks
21 December	Paul Anka	"Diana"	8 weeks
28 December	Paul Anka	"Diana"	8 weeks

== 1958 ==
Date	Artist	Single	Weeks at number one
4 January	Paul Anka	"Diana"	8 weeks
11 January	Paul Anka	"Diana"	8 weeks
18 January	Paul Anka	"Diana"	8 weeks
24 January	Paul Anka	"Diana"	8 weeks
1 February	Paul Anka	"Diana"	8 weeks
8 February	Paul Anka	"Diana"	8 weeks
15 February	Pat Boone	"April Love"	6 weeks
22 February	Pat Boone	"April Love"	6 weeks
1 March	Pat Boone	"April Love"	6 weeks
8 March	Pat Boone	"April Love"	6 weeks
15 March	Pat Boone	"April Love"	6 weeks
22 March	Pat Boone	"April Love"	6 weeks
29 March	Johnny Mathis	"The Twelfth of Never"	1 week
5 April	Perry Como	"Catch a Falling Star"	8 weeks
12 April	Perry Como	"Catch a Falling Star"	8 weeks
19 April	Perry Como	"Catch a Falling Star"	8 weeks
26 April	Perry Como	"Catch a Falling Star"	8 weeks
3 May	Perry Como	"Catch a Falling Star"	8 weeks
10 May	Perry Como	"Catch a Falling Star"	8 weeks
17 May	Perry Como	"Catch a Falling Star"	8 weeks
24 May	Perry Como	"Catch a Falling Star"	8 weeks
31 May	Laurie London	"He's Got the Whole World in His Hands"	4 weeks
7 June	Laurie London	"He's Got the Whole World in His Hands"	4 weeks
14 June	Laurie London	"He's Got the Whole World in His Hands"	4 weeks
21 June	Laurie London	"He's Got the Whole World in His Hands"	4 weeks
28 June	The Platters	"Twilight Time"	4 weeks
5 July	The Platters	"Twilight Time"	4 weeks
12 July	The Platters	"Twilight Time"	4 weeks
19 July	The Platters	"Twilight Time"	4 weeks
26 July	The Music of David Seville	"Witch Doctor"	1 week
2 August	Sheb Wooley	"The Purple People Eater"	6 weeks
9 August	Sheb Wooley	"The Purple People Eater"	6 weeks
16 August	Sheb Wooley	"The Purple People Eater"	6 weeks
23 August	Sheb Wooley	"The Purple People Eater"	6 weeks
30 August	Sheb Wooley	"The Purple People Eater"	6 weeks
6 September	Slim Dusty	"A Pub With No Beer"	1 week
13 September	Sheb Wooley	"The Purple People Eater"	6 weeks
20 September	The Kalin Twins	"When"	1 week
27 September	Perez Prado	"Patricia"	1 week
4 October	The Everly Brothers	"Bird Dog"	3 weeks
11 October	The Everly Brothers	"Bird Dog"	3 weeks
18 October	The Everly Brothers	"Bird Dog"	3 weeks
25 October	Domenico Modugno; Dean Martin	"Volare"	7 weeks
1 November	Domenico Modugno; Dean Martin	"Volare"	7 weeks
8 November	Domenico Modugno; Dean Martin	"Volare"	7 weeks
15 November	Domenico Modugno; Dean Martin	"Volare"	7 weeks
22 November	Domenico Modugno; Dean Martin	"Volare"	7 weeks
29 November	Domenico Modugno; Dean Martin	"Volare"	7 weeks
6 December	Domenico Modugno; Dean Martin	"Volare"	7 weeks
13 December	Tommy Edwards	"It's All in the Game"	1 week
20 December	The Kingston Trio	"Tom Dooley"	8 weeks
27 December	The Kingston Trio	"Tom Dooley"	8 weeks

== 1959 ==
Date	Artist	Single	Weeks at number one
3 January	The Kingston Trio	"Tom Dooley"	8 weeks
10 January	The Kingston Trio	"Tom Dooley"	8 weeks
17 January	The Kingston Trio	"Tom Dooley"	8 weeks
23 January	The Kingston Trio	"Tom Dooley"	8 weeks
31 January	The Kingston Trio	"Tom Dooley"	8 weeks
7 February	The Kingston Trio	"Tom Dooley"	8 weeks
14 February	The Platters	"Smoke Gets in Your Eyes"	10 weeks
21 February	The Platters	"Smoke Gets in Your Eyes"	10 weeks
28 February	The Platters	"Smoke Gets in Your Eyes"	10 weeks
7 March	The Platters	"Smoke Gets in Your Eyes"	10 weeks
14 March	The Platters	"Smoke Gets in Your Eyes"	10 weeks
21 March	The Platters	"Smoke Gets in Your Eyes"	10 weeks
28 March	The Platters	"Smoke Gets in Your Eyes"	10 weeks
4 April	The Platters	"Smoke Gets in Your Eyes"	10 weeks
11 April	The Platters	"Smoke Gets in Your Eyes"	10 weeks
18 April	The Platters	"Smoke Gets in Your Eyes"	10 weeks
25 April	Chris Barber's Jazz Band	"Petite Fleur"	1 week
2 May	Frankie Avalon	"Venus"	2 weeks
9 May	Frankie Avalon	"Venus"	2 weeks
16 May	Elvis Presley	"A Fool Such as I"	6 weeks
23 May	Elvis Presley	"A Fool Such as I"	6 weeks
30 May	Elvis Presley	"A Fool Such as I"	6 weeks
6 June	Elvis Presley	"A Fool Such as I"	6 weeks
13 June	Elvis Presley	"A Fool Such as I"	6 weeks
20 June	Elvis Presley	"A Fool Such as I"	6 weeks
27 June	Lloyd Price	"Personality"	5 weeks
4 July	Lloyd Price	"Personality"	5 weeks
11 July	Lloyd Price	"Personality"	5 weeks
18 July	Lloyd Price	"Personality"	5 weeks
25 July	Lloyd Price	"Personality"	5 weeks
1 August	Johnny Horton	"The Battle of New Orleans"	6 weeks
8 August	Johnny Horton	"The Battle of New Orleans"	6 weeks
15 August	Johnny Horton	"The Battle of New Orleans"	6 weeks
22 August	Johnny Horton	"The Battle of New Orleans"	6 weeks
29 August	Johnny Horton	"The Battle of New Orleans"	6 weeks
5 September	Johnny Horton	"The Battle of New Orleans"	6 weeks
12 September	Conway Twitty	"Mona Lisa"	2 weeks
19 September	Conway Twitty	"Mona Lisa"	2 weeks
26 September	The Browns	"The Three Bells"	5 weeks
3 October	The Browns	"The Three Bells"	5 weeks
10 October	The Browns	"The Three Bells"	5 weeks
17 October	The Browns	"The Three Bells"	5 weeks
24 October	The Browns	"The Three Bells"	5 weeks
31 October	Johnnie Ray	"I'll Never Fall in Love Again"	2 weeks
7 November	Johnnie Ray	"I'll Never Fall in Love Again"	2 weeks
14 November	Col Joye and the Joy Boys	"Oh Yeah Uh Huh"	4 weeks
21 November	Col Joye and the Joy Boys	"Oh Yeah Uh Huh"	4 weeks
28 November	Col Joye and the Joy Boys	"Oh Yeah Uh Huh"	4 weeks
5 December	Col Joye and the Joy Boys	"Oh Yeah Uh Huh"	4 weeks
12 December	Bill Haley & His Comets	"Joey's Song" / "Ooh! Look-a-There, Ain't She Pretty?"	8 weeks (5 weeks in 1960)
19 December	Bill Haley & His Comets	"Joey's Song" / "Ooh! Look-a-There, Ain't She Pretty?"	8 weeks (5 weeks in 1960)
26 December	Bill Haley & His Comets	"Joey's Song" / "Ooh! Look-a-There, Ain't She Pretty?"	8 weeks (5 weeks in 1960)

== See also ==
- Music of Australia
- Lists of UK Singles Chart number ones
- List of UK Singles Chart number ones of the 1950s
- List of Billboard number-one singles
- 1950 in music
- 1951 in music
- 1952 in music
- 1953 in music
- 1954 in music
- 1955 in music
- 1956 in music
- 1957 in music
- 1958 in music
- 1959 in music
