= List of top 25 singles for 1957 in Australia =

Top 25 singles of 1957 < 1956 1958 >

Other Australian top charts for 1957
- top 25 albums

Australian number-one charts of 1957
- albums
- singles

The following lists the top 25 (end of year) charting singles on the Australian Singles Charts, for the year of 1957. These were the best charting singles in Australia for 1957. The source for this year is the "Kent Music Report", known from 1987 onwards as the "Australian Music Report".

#	Title	Artist	Highest pos. reached	Weeks at No. 1
1.	"Around the World"	Bing Crosby; Nat King Cole	1	8
2.	"Diana"	Paul Anka	1	8 (pkd #1 1957 & 58)
3.	"Love Letters in the Sand"	Pat Boone	1	5
4.	"Round and Round"	Perry Como; The Four Lads	1	8
5.	"Singing the Blues"	Guy Mitchell	1	6
6.	"Hey There"	Rosemary Clooney	1	4
7.	"A White Sport Coat (and a Pink Carnation)"	Marty Robbins	1	4
8.	"True Love"	Bing Crosby & Grace Kelly	3	
9.	"Young Love"	Tab Hunter; Sonny James	1	3
10.	"Marianne"	Terry Gilkyson and the Easy Riders	1	3
11.	"Tammy"	Debbie Reynolds; The Ames Brothers	2	
12.	"It's Not For Me to Say"	Johnny Mathis	2	
13.	"Cindy, Oh Cindy"	Eddie Fisher	1	2
14.	"Wonderful! Wonderful!"	Johnny Mathis	1	1
15.	"The Green Door"	Jim Lowe	1	1
16.	"Jamaica Farewell"	Harry Belafonte	2	
17.	"You Don't Know Me"	Jerry Vale	5	
18.	"Butterfly"	Andy Williams	2	
19.	"That'll Be the Day"	The Crickets	2	
20.	"In the Middle of an Island"	Tony Bennett	3	
21.	"Friendly Persuasion (Thee I Love)"	Pat Boone	4	
22.	"Jailhouse Rock"	Elvis Presley	3	
23.	"White Silver Sands"	Don Rondo	2	
24.	"Hernando's Hideaway"	Johnnie Ray	2	
25.	"Garden of Eden"	Joe Valino	3	

These charts are calculated by David Kent of the Kent Music Report and they are based on the number of weeks and position the records reach within the top 100 singles for each week.

source: David Kent's "Australian Chart Book 1940-1969"
