= List of top 25 singles for 1955 in Australia =

Top 25 singles of 1955 < 1954 1956 >

Other Australian top charts for 1955
- top 25 albums

Australian number-one charts of 1955
- albums
- singles

The following lists the top 25 (end of year) charting singles on the Australian Singles Charts, for the year of 1955. These were the best charting singles in Australia for 1955. The source for this year is the "Kent Music Report", known from 1987 onwards as the "Australian Music Report".

#	Title	Artist	Highest pos. reached	Weeks at No. 1
1.	"Hold My Hand"	Don Cornell; Nat King Cole	1	6
2.	"Rock Around the Clock"	Bill Haley and His Comets	1	6
3.	"Melody of Love"	The Four Aces; Billy Vaughn	1	6
4.	"Unchained Melody"	Al Hibbler; Les Baxter	1	5
5.	"I Need You Now"	Eddie Fisher	1	3
6.	"Stranger in Paradise"	Tony Bennett	1	3
7.	"Mr. Sandman"	The Four Aces; The Chordettes	1	4
8.	"Let Me Go, Lover"	Joan Weber; Teresa Brewer	1	2
9.	"The Ballad of Davy Crockett"	"Tennessee" Ernie Ford; Fess Parker	1	4
10.	"Cherry Pink and Apple Blossom White"	Les Baxter; Perez Prado	1	3
11.	"The High and the Mighty"	Victor Young; Les Baxter	1	3
12.	"A Man Called Peter"	Darryl Stewart	2	1
13.	"Softly, Softly"	Ruby Murray	2	
14.	"Skokiaan"	The Four Lads	1	2
15.	"Love is a Many Splendored Thing"	Nat King Cole; The Four Aces	3	
16.	"Serenade (from "The Student Prince")"	Mario Lanza	1	2
17.	"The Naughty Lady of Shady Lane"	Dean Martin; The Ames Brothers	1	2
18.	"If I Give My Heart to You"	Doris Day; Nat King Cole	2	
19.	"Learnin' the Blues"	Frank Sinatra	1	1
20.	"Something's Gotta Give"	Sammy Davis Jr; The McGuire Sisters	3	
21.	"A Blossom Fell"	Nat King Cole	2	
22.	"Papa Loves Mambo"	Johnnie Ray; Perry Como	3	
23.	"Hajji Baba"	Nat King Cole	4	
24.	"Humming Bird"	Frankie Laine; Les Paul and Mary Ford	4	
25.	"I Talk to the Trees"	David Hughes; Tony Fontane	5	

These charts are calculated by David Kent of the Kent Music Report and they are based on the number of weeks and position the records reach within the top 100 singles for each week.

source: David Kent's "Australian Chart Book 1940-1969"
