= List of number-one singles in Australia during the 1940s =

Australian number-one singles of the 1940s 1950s >

Australian top 25 singles
- 1940 1941 1942 1943 1944; 1945 1946 1947 1948 1949

Australian top 25 albums
- 1940 1941 1942 1943 1944; 1945 1946 1947 1948 1949

The following lists the number one singles on the Australian Singles Chart during the 1940s.

The source for this decade is the "Kent Music Report". These charts were calculated in the 1990s in retrospect, by David Kent, using archival data. Before 1949, charts in Australia were only available on a monthly basis.

Note: during the 1940s, often more than one version of a particular song by different artists charted at the same time, thus more than one artist may be listed for a song. Different versions are separated by a semi-colon (;).

== 1940 ==
Date	Artist	Single	Months at number one
January	Joe Loss; Carson Robison	"South of the Border (Down Mexico Way)"	3 months
February	Joe Loss; Carson Robison	"South of the Border (Down Mexico Way)"	3 months
March	Joe Loss; Carson Robison	"South of the Border (Down Mexico Way)"	3 months
April	The Andrews Sisters; Joe Loss	"Beer Barrel Polka (Roll Out The Barrel)"	1 month
May	Joe Loss; Glenn Miller	"Blue Orchids"	3 months
June	Joe Loss; Glenn Miller	"Blue Orchids"	3 months
July	Joe Loss; Glenn Miller	"Blue Orchids"	3 months
August	Joe Loss	"Till the Lights of London Shine Again"	3 months
September	Joe Loss	"Till the Lights of London Shine Again"	3 months
October	Joe Loss	"Till the Lights of London Shine Again"	3 months
November	Kate Smith; Glenn Miller	"The Woodpecker Song"	5 months
December	Kate Smith; Glenn Miller	"The Woodpecker Song"	5 months

== 1941 ==
Date	Artist	Single	Months at number one
January	Kate Smith; Glenn Miller	"The Woodpecker Song"	5 months
February	Kate Smith; Glenn Miller	"The Woodpecker Song"	5 months
March	Kate Smith; Glenn Miller	"The Woodpecker Song"	5 months
April	The Tic-Toc Rhythm Orchestra; Dick Robertson	"Ferryboat Serenade"	1 month
May	Vera Lynn; West End Players	"A Nightingale Sang in Berkeley Square"	4 months
June	Vera Lynn; West End Players	"A Nightingale Sang in Berkeley Square"	4 months
July	Vera Lynn; West End Players	"A Nightingale Sang in Berkeley Square"	4 months
August	Vera Lynn; West End Players	"A Nightingale Sang in Berkeley Square"	4 months
September	Shep Fields; West End Players	"Down Argentina Way"	1 month
October	Judy Garland; The Jesters	"It's a Great Day for the Irish"	2 months
November	George Formby	"Bless 'em All"	1 month
December	Judy Garland; The Jesters	"It's a Great Day for the Irish"	2 months

== 1942 ==
Date	Artist	Single	Months at number one
January	Glenn Miller & Joe Loss	"In the Mood"	5 months
February	Glenn Miller & Joe Loss	"In the Mood"	5 months
March	Glenn Miller & Joe Loss	"In the Mood"	5 months
April	Glenn Miller & Joe Loss	"In the Mood"	5 months
May	Glenn Miller & Joe Loss	"In the Mood"	5 months
June	The Andrews Sisters; Sammy Kaye	"Daddy"	1 month
July	Vera Lynn; Jean Cerchi	"(There'll Be Bluebirds Over) The White Cliffs of Dover"	3 months
August	Vera Lynn; Jean Cerchi	"(There'll Be Bluebirds Over) The White Cliffs of Dover"	3 months
September	Vera Lynn; Jean Cerchi	"(There'll Be Bluebirds Over) The White Cliffs of Dover"	3 months
October	Horace Heidt; Ink Spots	"I Don't Want to Set the World on Fire"	2 months
November	Horace Heidt; Ink Spots	"I Don't Want to Set the World on Fire"	2 months
December	Gene Autry; Horace Heidt	"Deep in the Heart of Texas"	2 months

== 1943 ==
Date	Artist	Single	Months at number one
January	Gene Autry; Horace Heidt	"Deep in the Heart of Texas"	2 months
February	Harry James	"I Don't Want to Walk Without You"	4 months
March	Harry James	"I Don't Want to Walk Without You"	4 months
April	Harry James	"I Don't Want to Walk Without You"	4 months
May	Harry James	"I Don't Want to Walk Without You"	4 months
June	Bing Crosby	"White Christmas"	5 months
July	Bing Crosby	"White Christmas"	5 months
August	Bing Crosby	"White Christmas"	5 months
September	Bing Crosby	"White Christmas"	5 months
October	Bing Crosby	"White Christmas"	5 months
November	Dinah Shore	"Why Don't You Fall in Love With Me"	1 month
December	Vera Lynn; Harry James	"I Had the Craziest Dream"	1 month

== 1944 ==
Date	Artist	Single	Months at number one
January	Ink Spots	"Ev'ry Night About This Time"	1 month
February	Vera Lynn & Joe Loss	"You'll Never Know"	3 months
March	Vera Lynn & Joe Loss	"You'll Never Know"	3 months
April	Vera Lynn & Joe Loss	"You'll Never Know"	3 months
May	Frank Sinatra; George Trevare	"Sunday, Monday or Always"	2 months
June	Frank Sinatra; George Trevare	"Sunday, Monday or Always"	2 months
July	Ink Spots	"Whispering Grass (Don't Tell the Trees)"	1 month
August	Dinah Shore; Glenn Miller	"Happy In Love"	1 month
September	Bing Crosby & The Andrews Sisters	"Vict'ry Polka"	1 month
October	Bing Crosby & The Andrews Sisters	"Pistol Packin' Mama"	1 month
November	Joe Loss; Vera Lynn	"No Other Love"	1 month
December	Ink Spots; Frank Sinatra	"A Lovely Way to Spend An Evening"	1 month

== 1945 ==
Date	Artist	Single	Months at number one
January	Geraldo; Lale Andersen	"Lili Marlene"	1 month
February	Bing Crosby	"Amor, Amor"	2 months
March	Bing Crosby	"Amor, Amor"	2 months
April	Bing Crosby & Joe Loss	"Swinging on a Star"	1 month
May	Bing Crosby; Dinah Shore	"Long Ago (and Far Away)"	1 month
June	Bing Crosby; Dinah Shore	"It Could Happen to You"	2 months
July	Bing Crosby; Dinah Shore	"It Could Happen to You"	2 months
August	Bing Crosby; Joe Loss	"I'll Be Seeing You"	1 month
September	Bing Crosby & The Andrews Sisters	"Don't Fence Me In"	3 months
October	Bing Crosby & The Andrews Sisters	"Don't Fence Me In"	3 months
November	Bing Crosby & The Andrews Sisters	"Don't Fence Me In"	3 months
December	Bing Crosby	"(Too Ra Loo Ra Loo Ral) That's an Irish Lullaby"	1 month

== 1946 ==
Date	Artist	Single	Months at number one
January	The Organ, The Dance Band and Me; Les Brown	"My Dreams Are Getting Better All the Time"	1 month
February	The Andrews Sisters	"Rum and Coca-Cola"	2 months
March	The Andrews Sisters	"Rum and Coca-Cola"	2 months
April	Ink Spots & Ella Fitzgerald	"Into Each Life Some Rain Must Fall"	1 month
May	Bing Crosby; Frank Sinatra	"A Friend of Yours"	2 months
June	Bing Crosby; Frank Sinatra	"A Friend of Yours"	2 months
July	Ella Fitzgerald & The Ink Spots; Duke Ellington	"I'm Beginning to See the Light"	1 month
August	Bing Crosby; Judy Garland	"On the Atchison, Topeka and the Santa Fe"	2 months
September	Bing Crosby; Judy Garland	"On the Atchison, Topeka and the Santa Fe"	2 months
October	Bing Crosby; Freddy Martin	"Symphony"	2 months
November	Bing Crosby; Freddy Martin	"Symphony"	2 months
December	Bing Crosby; Kate Smith	"Sioux City Sue"	1 month

== 1947 ==
Date	Artist	Single	Months at number one
January	Sammy Kaye; The Merry Macs	"Laughing on the Outside (Crying on the Inside)"	1 month
February	Ink Spots; Perry Como	"Prisoner of Love"	2 months
March	Ink Spots; Perry Como	"Prisoner of Love"	2 months
April	Ink Spots; Freddy Martin	"To Each His Own"	1 month
May	Frank Sinatra; Tex Beneke	"Five Minutes More"	1 month
June	Bing Crosby; Dinah Shore	"You Keep Coming Back Like a Song"	1 month
July	Bing Crosby; Perry Como	"They Say It's Wonderful"	2 months
August	Bing Crosby; Perry Como	"They Say It's Wonderful"	2 months
September	Al Jolson; Bing Crosby	"The Anniversary Song"	5 months
October	Frank Sinatra; Dick Haymes	"Mam'selle"	1 month
November	Bing Crosby; Dick Haymes & The Andrews Sisters	"(There's No Business Like) Show Business"	1 month
December	Al Jolson; Bing Crosby	"The Anniversary Song"	5 months

== 1948 ==
- Good-Night Mister Moon by Allan Ryan and William Flynn

Date	Artist	Single	Months at number one
January	Al Jolson; Bing Crosby	"The Anniversary Song"	5 months
February	Al Jolson; Bing Crosby	"The Anniversary Song"	5 months
March	Al Jolson; Bing Crosby	"The Anniversary Song"	5 months
April	Bing Crosby; Dick Haymes & The Andrews Sisters	"Near You"	4 months
May	Perry Como; Joe Loss	"Chi-Baba, Chi-Baba (My Bambino Go to Sleep)"	1 month
June	Bing Crosby; Dick Haymes & The Andrews Sisters	"Near You"	4 months
July	Bing Crosby; Dick Haymes & The Andrews Sisters	"Near You"	4 months
August	Bing Crosby; Dick Haymes & The Andrews Sisters	"Near You"	4 months
September	Sammy Kaye; Geraldo	"Serenade of the Bells"	1 month
October	Bing Crosby; Gracie Fields	"Now Is the Hour (Maori Farewell Song)"	1 month
November	George Trevare; Art Mooney	"I'm Looking Over a Four Leaf Clover"	1 month
December	Al Jolson; Perry Como	"When You Were Sweet Sixteen"	1 month

== 1949 ==
Week beginning	Artist	Single	Weeks at number one
1 January	Dick Haymes & The Andrews Sisters	"Teresa"	1 week
8 January	Dinah Shore; Gene Autry	"Buttons and Bows"	13 weeks
15 January	Dinah Shore; Gene Autry	"Buttons and Bows"	13 weeks
22 January	Dinah Shore; Gene Autry	"Buttons and Bows"	13 weeks
29 January	Dinah Shore; Gene Autry	"Buttons and Bows"	13 weeks
5 February	Dinah Shore; Gene Autry	"Buttons and Bows"	13 weeks
12 February	Dinah Shore; Gene Autry	"Buttons and Bows"	13 weeks
19 February	Dinah Shore; Gene Autry	"Buttons and Bows"	13 weeks
26 February	Dinah Shore; Gene Autry	"Buttons and Bows"	13 weeks
5 March	Dinah Shore; Gene Autry	"Buttons and Bows"	13 weeks
12 March	Dinah Shore; Gene Autry	"Buttons and Bows"	13 weeks
19 March	Dinah Shore; Gene Autry	"Buttons and Bows"	13 weeks
26 March	Dinah Shore; Gene Autry	"Buttons and Bows"	13 weeks
2 April	Dinah Shore; Gene Autry	"Buttons and Bows"	13 weeks
9 April	Perry Como; Tony Pastor	"Rambling Rose"	5 weeks
16 April	Perry Como; Tony Pastor	"Rambling Rose"	5 weeks
23 April	Perry Como; Tony Pastor	"Rambling Rose"	5 weeks
30 April	Perry Como; Tony Pastor	"Rambling Rose"	5 weeks
7 May	Perry Como; Tony Pastor	"Rambling Rose"	5 weeks
14 May	Danny Kaye & The Andrews Sisters; Ray McKinley	"Put 'em in a Box, Tie 'em with a Ribbon"	2 weeks
21 May	Danny Kaye & The Andrews Sisters; Ray McKinley	"Put 'em in a Box, Tie 'em with a Ribbon"	2 weeks
28 May	Kay Kyser	"On a Slow Boat to China"	6 weeks
4 June	Kay Kyser	"On a Slow Boat to China"	6 weeks
11 June	Kay Kyser	"On a Slow Boat to China"	6 weeks
18 June	Kay Kyser	"On a Slow Boat to China"	6 weeks
25 June	Kay Kyser	"On a Slow Boat to China"	6 weeks
2 July	Kay Kyser	"On a Slow Boat to China"	6 weeks
9 July	Patty Andrews & Bob Crosby	"The Pussy Cat Song (Nyow! Nyot Nyow!)"	4 weeks
16 July	Patty Andrews & Bob Crosby	"The Pussy Cat Song (Nyow! Nyot Nyow!)"	4 weeks
23 July	Patty Andrews & Bob Crosby	"The Pussy Cat Song (Nyow! Nyot Nyow!)"	4 weeks
30 July	Patty Andrews & Bob Crosby	"The Pussy Cat Song (Nyow! Nyot Nyow!)"	4 weeks
6 August	Ink Spots; Joe Loss	"Say Something Sweet to Your Sweetheart"	2 weeks
13 August	Ink Spots; Joe Loss	"Say Something Sweet to Your Sweetheart"	2 weeks
20 August	Bing Crosby; Joe Loss	"Far Away Places"	5 weeks
27 August	Bing Crosby; Joe Loss	"Far Away Places"	5 weeks
3 September	Bing Crosby; Joe Loss	"Far Away Places"	5 weeks
10 September	Bing Crosby; Joe Loss	"Far Away Places"	5 weeks
17 September	Bing Crosby; Joe Loss	"Far Away Places"	5 weeks
24 September	Evelyn Knight (singer); Sammy Kaye	"Powder Your Face with Sunshine"	2 weeks
1 October	Evelyn Knight (singer); Sammy Kaye	"Powder Your Face with Sunshine"	2 weeks
8 October	Buddy Clark; Larry Green	"It's a Big, Wide, Wonderful World"	4 weeks
15 October	Buddy Clark; Larry Green	"It's a Big, Wide, Wonderful World"	4 weeks
22 October	Buddy Clark; Larry Green	"It's a Big, Wide, Wonderful World"	4 weeks
29 October	Buddy Clark; Larry Green	"It's a Big, Wide, Wonderful World"	4 weeks
5 November	Vaughn Monroe; Bing Crosby	"Riders in the Sky"	5 weeks
12 November	Vaughn Monroe; Bing Crosby	"Riders in the Sky"	5 weeks
19 November	Vaughn Monroe; Bing Crosby	"Riders in the Sky"	5 weeks
26 November	Vaughn Monroe; Bing Crosby	"Riders in the Sky"	5 weeks
3 December	Vaughn Monroe; Bing Crosby	"Riders in the Sky"	5 weeks
10 December	Evelyn Knight (singer); Joe Loss	"A Little Bird Told Me"	2 weeks
17 December	Evelyn Knight (singer); Joe Loss	"A Little Bird Told Me"	2 weeks
24 December	Burl Ives; Dinah Shore	"Lavender Blue (Dilly Dilly)"	6 weeks (4 weeks in 1950)
31 December	Burl Ives; Dinah Shore	"Lavender Blue (Dilly Dilly)"	6 weeks (4 weeks in 1950)

== See also ==
- Music of Australia
- List of musical events
- List of Billboard number-one singles
