= Inspirations of Life and Love =

Studio album by Paul Anka
- Released: February 13, 2026
- Studio: Anka's home studio
- Labels: Green Hill Music; Sun

Paul Anka chronology
Sessions (2022)	Inspirations of Life and Love (2026)

Singles from Inspirations of Life and Love
- 1. "Anytime" Released: October 17, 2025; 2. "Let Me Try Again" Released: November 14, 2025

Inspirations of Life and Love is the thirtieth studio album by Canadian-American singer-songwriter Paul Anka, released on February 13, 2026. The album was preceded by two singles.

== Composition and lyrics ==
Both of the album's singles, "Anytime" and "Let Me Try Again", are re-recorded versions of songs previously released by Anka, in 1975 (titled "Anytime (I'll Be There)") and 1989 (on the album Somebody Loves You), respectively. Both songs were originally performed by Frank Sinatra.

== Release and promotion ==
The album was announced on 17 October 2025 alongside its first single "Anytime". It is Anka's first album since 2022's Sessions.

== Track listing ==
According to Rock Cellar Magazine:

1. "Just Can't Wait"
2. "Anytime"
3. "Boulevard"
4. "It Was a Very Good Year"
5. "Let Me Try Again"
6. "All of a Sudden (My Heart Sings)"
7. "Love Never Felt So Good"
8. "Freedom for You and Me (Freedom for the World)"
9. "I Believe"
10. "The Last Time I Saw You"
11. "That’s Life"
