= List of top 25 singles for 1959 in Australia =

Top 25 singles of 1959 < 1958 1960 >

Other Australian top charts for 1959
- top 25 albums

Australian number-one charts of 1959
- albums
- singles

The following lists the top 25 (end of year) charting singles on the Australian Singles Charts, for the year of 1959. These were the best charting singles in Australia for 1959. The source for this year is the "Kent Music Report", known from 1987 onwards as the "Australian Music Report".

#	Title	Artist	Highest pos. reached	Weeks at No. 1
1.	"Smoke Gets in Your Eyes"	The Platters	1	10
2.	"Joey's Song"	Bill Haley and His Comets	1	8 (pkd #1 in 1959 & 60)
3.	"A Fool Such as I"	Elvis Presley	1	6
4.	"The Battle of New Orleans"	Johnny Horton	1	6
5.	"Personality"	Lloyd Price	1	5
6.	"Oh Yeah Uh Huh"	Col Joye and the Joy Boys	1	4
7.	"The Three Bells"	The Browns	1	5
8.	"I'll Never Fall in Love Again"	Johnnie Ray	1	2
9.	"Venus"	Frankie Avalon	1	2
10.	"Mona Lisa"	Conway Twitty	1	2
11.	"Petite Fleur"	Chris Barber's Jazz Band	1	1
12.	"Bye Bye Baby (Goodbye)"	Col Joye and the Joy Boys	3	
13.	"Morgen (One More Sunrise)"	Ivo Robic	2	
14.	"Beep Beep"	The Playmates	2	
15.	"Bimbombey"	Jimmie Rodgers	3	
16.	"Shout"	Johnny O'Keefe	2	
17.	"Gotta Travel On"	Billy Grammer	6	
18.	"She Was Only Seventeen"	Marty Robbins	2	
19.	"Rockin Rollin Clementine"	Col Joye and the Joy Boys	3	
20.	"The Children's Marching Song (Nick Nack Paddy Whack)"	Cyril Stapleton; Mitch Miller	2	
21.	"Waterloo"	Stonewall Jackson	2	
22.	"Mack the Knife"	Bobby Darin	5	
23.	"Red River Rock"	Johnny and the Hurricanes	5	
24.	"To Know Him is to Love Him"	The Teddy Bears	3	
25.	"Pink Shoe Laces"	Dodie Stevens	2	

These charts are calculated by David Kent of the Kent Music Report and they are based on the number of weeks and position the records reach within the top 100 singles for each week.

source: David Kent's "Australian Chart Book 1940-1969"
