= Johnny's Theme =

Tonight Show Starring Johnny Carson theme song

Song by Paul Anka and Johnny Carson
- Published: September 12, 1962
- Genre: Jazz; big band
- Composers: Paul Anka; Johnny Carson
- Lyricist: Johnny Carson

"Johnny's Theme" is an instrumental jazz song played as the opening theme of The Tonight Show Starring Johnny Carson from the show's inception in 1962 through its finale in 1992. The piece was composed by Paul Anka and Johnny Carson, based on a previous composition by Anka. It was performed by The Tonight Show Band, which released an arrangement by Tommy Newsom in 1986 as part of its Grammy Award-winning debut album. The single release also earned a Grammy nomination.

"Johnny's Theme" has since been released in cover versions and on compilation albums. It has appeared in several films, and been played live in concert by school bands and by amateur and professional musicians, including Doc Severinsen's Big Band.

== Development and evolution ==
=== 1959: Two songs ===
"Johnny's Theme" began life as "Toot Sweet", a pop instrumental composed in 1959 by Paul Anka and recorded by Tutti's Trumpets. It was released on Disney's Buena Vista label as the B-side to The Camarata Strings' single "Lost In a Fog".

"Tutti" Camarata, who was Annette Funicello's producer at the time, asked Anka to write some songs for Funicello's first album to follow her work on The Mickey Mouse Club. Anka added lyrics to "Toot Sweet" and published them under the title "It's Really Love", and the song was released as part of Annette Sings Anka. He recorded his own version of "It's Really Love" that same year for the French film Faibles Femmes; it was released on seven-inch EPs in France, Italy and Spain.

=== 1962: Johnny Carson ===
When Johnny Carson, a fan of jazz music, was preparing to take over as the permanent host of The Tonight Show starting in October 1962, he recognized that he would need a theme song. Carson and Anka had worked together in England on the television special An Evening with Paul Anka in 1961; when they happened to meet up again in New York City the following year, Carson manager Al Bruno mentioned needing a theme.

Anka created a new instrumental arrangement for "It's Really Love" and sent a demo to Carson and Ed McMahon, who were in Fort Lauderdale, Florida, making preparations for the show. McMahon said "it was the first time either one of us heard [the song]—and magic."

=== 1962–92: The Tonight Show Starring Johnny Carson ===
"Johnny's Theme (The Tonight Show Theme)"

Single by The Tonight Show Band

from the album The Tonight Show Band
- B-side: "Skyliner"
- Released: 1986
- Recorded: August 5–7, 1986
- Length: 1:17
- Label: Amherst
- Songwriters: Paul Anka, Johnny Carson
- Producers: Jeff Tyzik; Allen Vizzutti

Audio sample
- file; help

Shortly after sending the demo, Anka received a telephone call and was told that Tonight Show bandleader Skitch Henderson was angry because Carson wanted to use a theme song written by a "20-year-old kid." Anka said he then offered to let Carson write and publish new lyrics in order to claim a songwriter's credit along with half of the royalties every time the song was played which would earn each man an average of about US$200,000 per year. Orange Coast estimated in 1999 that "Johnny's Theme" had been played more than 1,400,000 times.

The song was retired along with Carson in 1992; his iteration of The Tonight Show was called "the last widely public big-band forum." Incoming bandleader Branford Marsalis composed a more "funky" theme for successor Jay Leno because "a swing tune doesn't reflect Jay at all [and] jazz doesn't come to mind either."

== Releases ==
Henry Mancini and his orchestra recorded a 2:44 arrangement of "Johnny's Theme" in 1972 for the German EP Theme from Nicholas and Alexandra. A version also appeared as part of Mancini's 2010 compilation Big Screen, Little Screen. Paul Anka produced a recording by Top Brass for Buddah Records in 1973. Lawrence Welk and his orchestra performed the song for their 1976 album Nadia's Theme.

Doc Severinsen and the band recorded "Johnny's Theme" and 12 other tracks for their album The Tonight Show Band, released in 1986. Amherst Records also released the track as a single, titled "Johnny's Theme (The Tonight Show Theme)", which debuted at #27 on the Radio & Records Jazz Top 30 chart. The song has been released on compilations of television themes, the 1995 compilation 25 Years of Chrysalis Music, and The Very Best of Doc Severinsen (1998).

== Reception ==
"Johnny's Theme" earned a Grammy Award nomination for Best Pop Instrumental Performance, losing to "Top Gun Anthem" at the awards presentation in 1987. The Tonight Show Band was honored for Best Jazz Instrumental Performance, Big Band.

== Legacy ==
In 2005, Doc Severinsen, Carson's bandleader starting in 1967, said the song worked so well because it was "accessible. People could understand what it was, and it was associated with Johnny." Larry King called it "one of the most familiar themes in American television history." Paul Anka said the song was played for only a short time each night, "but everybody knows it. Simplicity is indeed royal."

The Washington Post in 2008 said the days of the television theme song were fading into nostalgia, though they "used to abound" with or without lyrics. For example, "Anka's Tonight Show theme was inseparable from late night and Johnny Carson."

"Johnny's Theme" has been included in numerous films including This Is My Life, Isn't She Great and Talk to Me. The song has been performed live by musicians at varying skill levels from student to professional. Iowa State Cyclones men's basketball coach Johnny Orr came onto the court pumping his fist as the pep band played "Johnny's Theme" before games at the Hilton Coliseum. Orr's tenure ran from 1980 to 1994.

Doc Severinsen has kept the song alive on tour. His Big Band opened its shows by playing the theme in its entirety, "just to let you know who we are." Severinsen and The Roots played "Johnny's Theme" during a 2015 episode of The Tonight Show Starring Jimmy Fallon.
