= Diana (Paul Anka song) =

1957 song by Paul Anka

Single by Paul Anka

from the album Paul Anka
- B-side: "Don't Gamble With Love"
- Released: July 2, 1957
- Recorded: May 20, 1957 (Don Costa, New York City, U.S.)
- Studio: RCA Victor, New York City
- Genre: Pop, rock and roll
- Length: 2:28
- Label: ABC-Paramount 9831
- Songwriter: Paul Anka

Paul Anka singles chronology
"I Confess" (1956)	"Diana" (1957)	"I Love You, Baby" (1957)

"Diana" is a song written and first performed by Paul Anka, who recorded it in May 1957 at Don Costa’s studio in New York City. Anka stated in his autobiography that the song was inspired by a girl named Diana Ayoub (13 March 1939 – 1 December 2022), whom he had met at his church and community events, and had developed a crush on.

== Recording ==
Session musicians on the record included George Barnes playing lead guitar, Bucky Pizzarelli playing the "Calypso" riff on guitar, Moe Wechsler on piano, Jerry Bruno on bass, and Panama Francis on drums. The song was recorded in May 1957 at RCA Victor Studios in New York. Backup singers included Artie Ripp.

== Release ==
Paul Anka's original 1957 recording reached number 1 (for two weeks) on the Billboard "R&B Best Sellers In Stores" chart, (although it climbed no higher than number 2 on Billboard′s composite "Top 100" chart) and has reportedly sold over nine million copies. "Diana" also hit number one on the R&B Best Sellers chart. It also reached number 1 on the UK's New Musical Express chart, staying there for nine weeks, and sold 1.25 million copies in the UK.

After signing with RCA Records, Anka re-recorded "Diana", along with many other hits in 1963, for the album Paul Anka's 21 Golden Hits.

== Chart performance and sales ==
=== Weekly charts ===
Chart (1957–1959)	Peak position
Australia	1
Canada (CHUM Hit Parade)	1
Belgium (Flanders)	2
Belgium (Wallonia)	1
Netherlands	1
Spain (Promusicae)	1
UK New Musical Express	1
US Billboard Top 100	2
US Billboard Best Sellers in Stores	1
US Billboard Most Played By Jockeys	2
US Billboard R&B Best Sellers in Stores	1
US Billboard Most Played R&B by Jockeys	2
US Cash Box Top 60	2
US Cash Box Top Ten Juke Box Tunes	1
US Cash Box Records Disc Jockeys Played Most	2
US Cash Box R&B Top 20	2

=== Year-end charts ===
Chart (1957)	Rank
US Billboard Best Selling Records: Popular	24
US Billboard Best Selling Records: Rhythm & Blues	8
US Billboard Most Played Records by Jockeys: Popular	28
US Billboard Most Played Records by Jockeys: Rhythm & Blues	23
US Billboard 1957 Top Tunes	18
US Cash Box Top Pop Singles	13
US Cash Box Top Rhythm & Blues Singles	30

== Sales ==
Region	Certification	Certified units/sales
Lebanon	—	8,000
United Kingdom	—	1,250,000

== Duet with Ricky Martin ==
"Diana"

Single by Paul Anka and Ricky Martin

from the album Amigos
- Released: January 30, 1996
- Genre: Latin pop
- Length: 3:41
- Songwriter: Paul Anka

Paul Anka singles chronology
"Second Chance" (1984)	"Diana" (1996)

Ricky Martin singles chronology
"Bombón de Azúcar" (1996)	"Diana" (1996)	"Volveras" (1997)

Paul Anka and Ricky Martin recorded a Spanish-language version of "Diana" and Anka included it on his album Amigos, and released it as a single in 1996.

=== Formats and track listings ===
CD Single

1. "Diana" – 3:41

=== Charts ===
Chart (1996)	Peak position
US Hot Latin Songs (Billboard)	24
US Latin Pop Airplay (Billboard)	12

== Other covers and adaptations ==
Frankie Lymon released a version of the song on his 1958 album Rock 'N Roll.

Brazilian singer Carlos Gonzaga recorded a Portuguese version, released in 1958.

Paul Anka sang an Italian version of the song, also called "Diana"; the Italian lyrics were written by Mario Panzeri. This version was released on Anka's 1963 album Italiano.

In 1965, Bobby Rydell released the song as a single and on the album Somebody Loves You. Rydell's version reached No. 12 on Canada's RPM Top 40 & 5, while reaching No. 98 on the US Billboard Hot 100, No. 23 on Billboard's Middle Road Singles chart, and No. 100 on the Record World 100 Top Pops.

In 1975, Australian band Ol' 55 released a version as their debut single. The song peaked at number 95 on the Kent Music Report.

A duet was in 2006 with Anka and the famous Italian singer and entertainer Adriano Celentano, with new Italian words by Giulio Rapetti (also known as Mogol) and by the same Celentano; the Italian title was "Oh Diana".

The punk band Misfits covered the song on their album Project 1950 in 2003.

== See also ==
- List of number-one singles in Australia during the 1950s
- List of Top 25 singles for 1957 in Australia
- Billboard year-end top 50 singles of 1957
- List of Billboard number-one rhythm and blues hits
- List of CHUM number-one singles of 1957
- List of UK Singles Chart number ones of the 1950s
