= Les Welch =

Australian bandleader, singer and pianist (1925–2014)

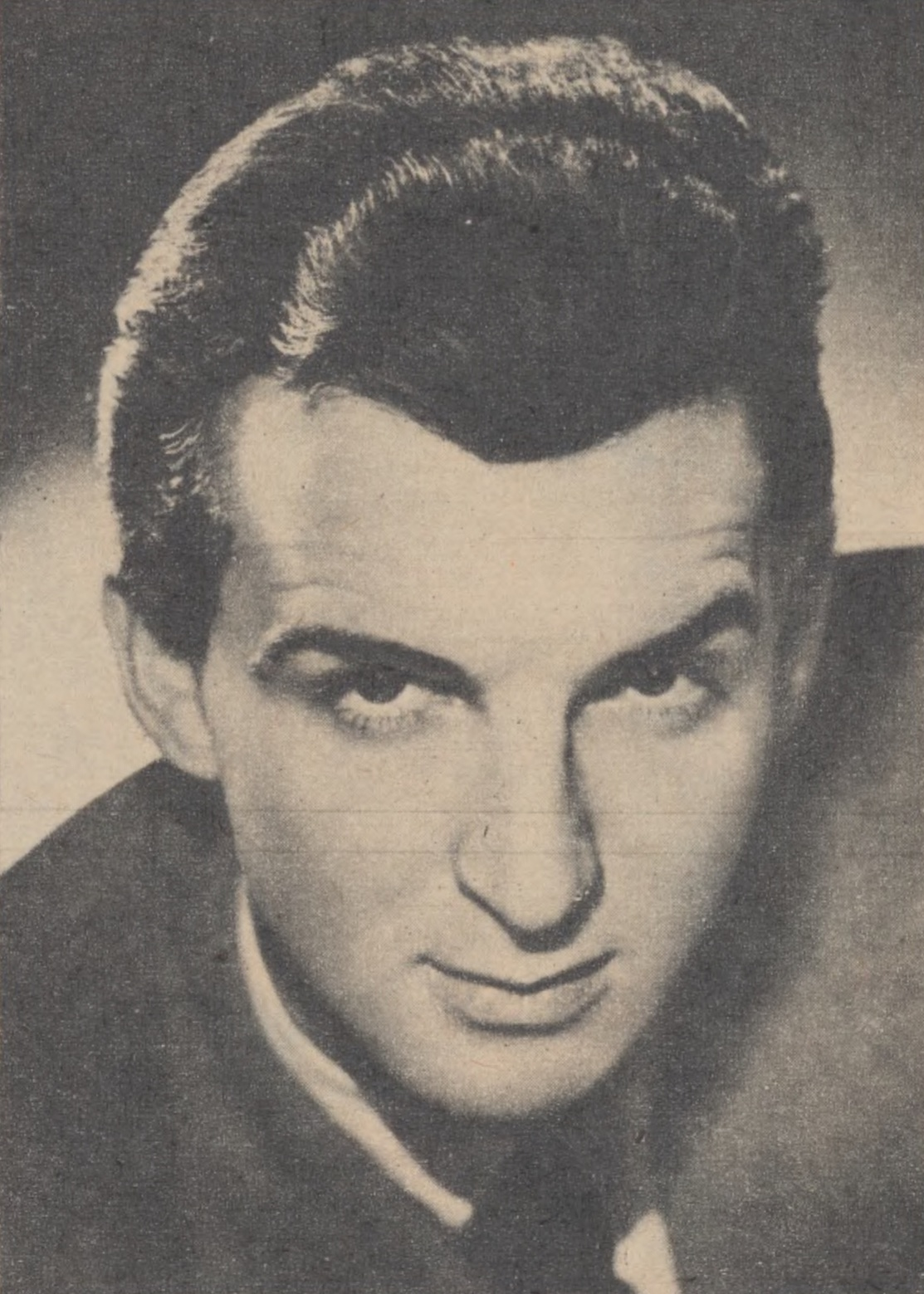
- Les Welch c1950

Background information
- Also known as: Spade
- Born: 6 August 1925; Newcastle-on-Tyne, England
- Died: 1 September 2014 (aged 89)
- Genres: Jazz, blues, swing music, dixieland, boogie-woogie
- Occupation: Musician
- Instruments: Piano, vocals
- Labels: Australian Record Company (ARC), Festival Records

Lesley Welch (6 August 1925 – 1 September 2014) was an Australian bandleader, singer, pianist and recording artist, popular in the 1940s and 1950s.

== Career ==
Lesley Welch was born in England in Newcastle-on-Tyne, but his family moved to Australia when he was young, and settled in Gladesville, New South Wales. After teaching himself piano, Welch began playing blues at parties and nightclubs during the 1940s. He toured nationally, performing jazz and appearing on radio, and in 1948 he was voted King of Swing at a Sydney Town Hall concert.

He signed a lifetime contract with the Australian Record Company (ARC) in 1949, and by 1952 had already recorded over 200 songs for them. He left ARC to set up rival Festival Records that year, and worked as A&R. In 1953 his album Tempos de Barrelhouse, was released by Festival as one of the first records by an Australian artist pressed at 33 RPM. During the 1950s, Welch performed with his jazz band at concerts targeted towards a teenage audience, but that were popular with all ages.

When he left Festival, Welch led the studio orchestra at the Seven Network in Sydney and later worked for Reg Grundy producing game shows.

Welch was later called "the Invisible Man of Australian music history" and "Australia's great anticipator of rock'n'roll" for his early work performing rock music in Australia. In 1950 he was described as "probably the biggest name in the Australian jazz field today."

Les Welch died in September 2014, aged 89.
