= List of top 25 singles for 1956 in Australia =

Top 25 singles of 1956 < 1955 1957 >

Other Australian top charts for 1956
- top 25 albums

Australian number-one charts of 1956
- albums
- singles

The following lists the top 25 (end of year) charting singles on the Australian Singles Charts, for the year of 1956. These were the best charting singles in Australia for 1956. The source for this year is the "Kent Music Report", known from 1987 onwards as the "Australian Music Report".

#	Title	Artist	Highest pos. reached	Weeks at No. 1
1.	"Just Walking in the Rain"	Johnnie Ray	1	9
2.	"Whatever Will Be, Will Be (Que Sera Sera)"	Doris Day	1	8
3.	"The Yellow Rose of Texas"	Mitch Miller	1	6
4.	"Sixteen Tons"	Tennessee Ernie Ford; Frankie Laine	1	6
5.	"Memories Are Made of This"	Dean Martin	1	5
6.	"The Rock and Roll Waltz"	Kay Starr	1	5
7.	"Hot Diggity (Dog Ziggity Boom)"	Perry Como	1	4
8.	"Mack the Knife"	Louis Armstrong	1	4
9.	"The Great Pretender"	The Platters	2	3
10.	"The Poor People of Paris"	Les Baxter	1	1
11.	"Portuguese Washerwomen"	Joe "Fingers" Carr	1	3
12.	"He"	Al Hibbler	2	2
13.	"Moonglow and Love Theme (from Picnic)" (medley)	Morris Stoloff	1	1
14.	"It's Almost Tomorrow"	Jo Stafford; The Dream Weavers	3	
15.	"A Sweet Old Fashioned Girl"	Teresa Brewer	2	
16.	"Moments to Remember"	The Four Lads	3	
17.	"Wayward Wind"	Gogi Grant	2	
18.	"My Prayer"	The Platters	4	
19.	"Ivory Tower"	Cathy Carr	2	
20.	"Canadian Sunset"	Hugo Winterhalter/Eddie Heywood; Andy Williams	2	
21.	"Allegheny Moon"	Patti Page	3	
22.	"Suddenly There's a Valley"	Jo Stafford	2	
23.	"A Woman in Love"	Frankie Laine	5	
24.	"Walk Hand in Hand"	Tony Martin; Andy Williams	4	
25.	"Hello Young Lovers"	Perry Como	6	

These charts are calculated by David Kent of the Kent Music Report and they are based on the number of weeks and position the records reach within the top 100 singles for each week.

source: David Kent's "Australian Chart Book 1940-1969"
