= Paul Anka (album) =

Studio album by Paul Anka
- Released: 1958
- Recorded: 1957–1958
- Genre: Pop, jazz
- Length: 34:58
- Label: ABC Paramount

Paul Anka chronology
| Paul Anka (1958) | My Heart Sings (1959) |

Singles from Paul Anka
- 1. "Diana" Released: 2 July 1957

Paul Anka is the 1958 debut album by Canadian singer Paul Anka. It was released by ABC Paramount, and features Anka's hit single, "Diana".

== Track listing ==
Side one
| No. | Title | Length |
|---|---|---|
| 1. | "Down by the Riverside" | 2:32 |
| 2. | "You Belong to Me" | 2:58 |
| 3. | "Your Cheatin' Heart" | 2:16 |
| 4. | "Waiting for You" | 3:03 |
| 5. | "Walkin' My Baby Back Home" | 1:58 |
| 6. | "Sing, Sing, Sing (With a Swing)" | 2:11 |
| Total length: | | 14:58 |

Side two
| No. | Title | Length |
|---|---|---|
| 7. | "Diana" | 2:29 |
| 8. | "Red Sails in the Sunset" | 2:43 |
| 9. | "Jambalaya" | 2:48 |
| 10. | "I've Heard That Song Before" | 2:34 |
| 11. | "Pity Pity" | 2:00 |
| 12. | "Side by Side" | 2:39 |
| Total length: | | 15:13 |

Bonus tracks
| No. | Title | Length |
|---|---|---|
| 13. | "Don't Gamble with Love" | 2:33 |
| 14. | "I Love You Baby" | 2:14 |
| Total length: | | 34:58 |
