= CBS Records International =

Former International arm of Columbia Records

- Parent company: CBS (1962–1988); Sony (1988–1991)
- Founded: 1962
- Defunct: 1991
- Status: Alternate brand of Columbia Records used outside of North America excluding Canada starting in 1976 (1961–1990); Company renamed Sony Music Entertainment, January 1991; Record label absorbed into Columbia
- Genre: Various
- Country of origin: U.S.

CBS Records International was the international arm of the Columbia Records unit of Columbia Broadcasting System, Inc. (CBS) formed in 1961 and launched in 1962. Previously, Columbia Records had licensed other record companies to manufacture and distribute Columbia recordings outside North America, such as Philips Records and its subsidiary Fontana (now part of the Universal Music Group) in Europe.

== Formation and history ==
In 1960, CBS acquired its Australian distributor since 1956, the Australian Record Company, and with it its flagship label Coronet Records. American Columbia material continued to be issued on the CBS Coronet Records label in Australia. The CBS label was launched in Australia in 1963. Also in 1960, CBS began negotiations with its European distributor Philips Records with the goal of the establishment of a CBS Records label in Europe. Philips' acquisition of Mercury Records paved the way for the formation of the CBS label in 1961 with Philips distributing the first batch of CBS recordings in Europe in 1962.

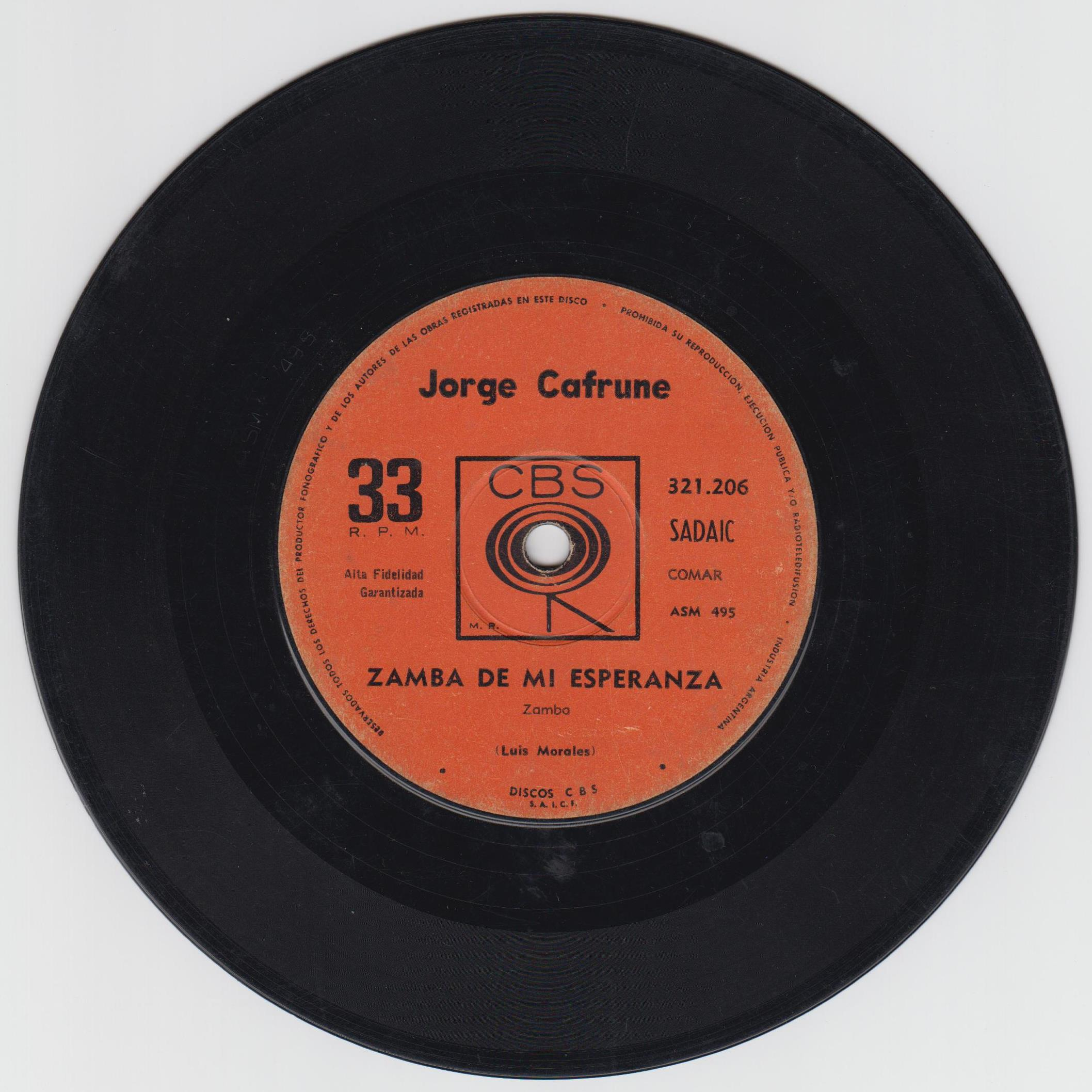
"Zamba de mi esperanza" by Jorge Cafrune

The use of the CBS name was required because EMI owned another record label called Columbia, which operated in every market except North America, Spain and Japan.

In 1964, CBS acquired Oriole Records which gave CBS Records its own distribution in the UK, beginning in 1965. Initially, only American Columbia product was distributed alongside Oriole's own roster on the renamed CBS label. EMI, which had distributed American Columbia recordings on its Columbia label until the Philips deal in 1951, continued to distribute CBS's other American labels, such as Epic and Okeh, on that label. The distribution deal with EMI expired in 1968, at which point CBS began distributing all their labels directly. In Germany, the CBS label distributed Motown from 1963 to 1965.

== Sale to Sony ==
CBS sold the record company in January 1988 to Sony for $2 billion. In 1991, the CBS Records company was renamed Sony Music Entertainment. The CBS Records label was renamed Columbia Records after Sony acquired the Columbia name and trade marks from EMI.

== Presidents of CBS Records International ==
- Harvey Schein, 1962–1971
- Walter Yetnikoff, 1971–1975
- Allen A. Davis, c. 1980
- Bob Summer, 1986–1991
