= List of top 25 singles for 1958 in Australia =

Top 25 singles of 1958 < 1957 1959 >

Other Australian top charts for 1958
- top 25 albums

Australian number-one charts of 1958
- albums
- singles

The following lists the top 25 (end of year) charting singles on the Australian Singles Charts, for the year of 1958. These were the best charting singles in Australia for 1958. The source for this year is the "Kent Music Report", known from 1987 onwards as the "Australian Music Report".

#	Title	Artist	Highest pos. reached	Weeks at No. 1
1.	"Tom Dooley"	The Kingston Trio	1	8 (pkd #1 1958 & 59)
2.	"Catch a Falling Star"	Perry Como	1	8
3.	"Volare (Nel Blu Dipinto Di Blu)"	Dean Martin; Domenico Modugno	1	7
4.	"April Love"	Pat Boone	1	6
5.	"The Purple People Eater"	Sheb Wooley	1	6
6.	"Bird Dog"	The Everly Brothers	1	3
7.	"He's Got the Whole World in His Hands"	Laurie London	1	4
8.	"Twilight Time"	The Platters	1	4
9.	"The Twelfth of Never"	Johnny Mathis	1	1
10.	"A Pub with No Beer"	Slim Dusty	1	1
11.	"It's All in the Game"	Tommy Edwards	1	1
12.	"Patricia"	Perez Prado	1	1
13.	"When"	The Kalin Twins	1	1
14.	"Witch Doctor"	The Music of David Seville	1	1
15.	"Fascination"	Nat King Cole	2	
16.	"Just Married"	Marty Robbins	2	
17.	"Susie Darlin'"	Robin Luke	3	
18.	"Young and Warm and Wonderful"	Tony Bennett	5	
19.	"Chances Are"	Johnny Mathis	3	
20.	"Fever"	Peggy Lee	2	
21.	"Peggy Sue"	Buddy Holly	2	
22.	"A Certain Smile"	Johnny Mathis	3	
23.	"Hard Headed Woman"	Elvis Presley	2	
24.	"The Story of My Life"	Marty Robbins	2	
25.	"Tequila"	The Champs	4	

These charts are calculated by David Kent of the Kent Music Report and they are based on the number of weeks and position the records reach within the top 100 singles for each week.

source: David Kent's "Australian Chart Book 1940-1969"
