= Look Who's Dropped In =

- Genre: Variety
- Presented by: George Trevare
- Country of origin: Australia
- Original language: English

Production
- Running time: 30 minutes

Original release
- Network: ABN-2
- Release: 14 December 1957 – 25 January 1958

Look Who's Dropped In is a four-part Australian television variety series which aired on Sydney station ABN-2. The half-hour series presented jazz music, competing in the time-slot against Pick a Box on ATN-7 and U.S. series Racket Squad on TCN-9. It aired fortnightly from 14 December 1957 to 25 January 1958, alternating with Tele-Variety. ABC variety series of the era typically had shorter seasons than those on commercial television. The series featured George Trevare.
