= Hollywood Square Dance =

Single by Sammy Kaye with Laura Leslie
- B-side: "Belmont Boogie"
- Released: 1949
- Genre: Pop; country
- Label: RCA Victor
- Songwriter(s): Charlie Hayes and Paul Weirick

"Hollywood Square Dance" is a popular song written by Charlie Hayes and Paul Weirick. The song was a 1950 hit for Sammy Kaye with vocal refrain by Laura Leslie, reaching the top position on Australia's singles chart.

== Charts ==
Chart (1950)	Peak position
Australia	1
