= George Trevare =

Australian jazz trombonist

George Trevare was an Australian Jazz trombonist, orchestral arranger and conductor. He wrote a number of his own compositions. Possibly well known for producing live radio dance band performances (escaping trade union bans on recording, due to the perceived threat to band members livelihood). Trevare also worked in a nationalist era, when he recorded Australian versions of popular content from overseas, to comply with domestic radio broadcasting quotas of local content and introducing local content in a style emulating popular imports

George worked with a number of famous people. In 1945, his band included Wally Norman (trumpet), George Trevare (trombone), Rolph Pommer (saxophone), Pat Lynch (piano), Morgan McGree (guitar), Horrie Bissell (bass), Al Vincer (drums, vibraphone) and a young Don Burrows playing clarinet.

Singer Lawrence Brooks on one of the Trevare recordings, is the father of Pulitzer Prize winning author, Geraldine Brooks.

In the 1950s and 60s he produced two TV music shows, The Magic of Music (1961) and Look Who's Dropped In, a four part series about jazz (1957).

== Works ==
- 1942 Overcast by Dorothy Dodd, recorded by George Trevare and his Australians on Regal Zonophone Record G24721
- 1942 When I Return To You (After The War Is Over) - original composition by George Trevare, words by Edmond Samuels & Mel G Lawton
- 1943 The Ghost In My Heart by Iris Mason & Hal Saunders, recorded by Lawrence Brooks with George Trevare and his Australians on RZ Record G24765
- 1943 Out of The Blue Gums - original composition by George Trevare
- 1943 'Don't Sweetheart Me' with vocals by Joan Blake
- 1943 Der Fuhrer's Face
- 1943 It's On The Bill by Iris Mason & Hal Saunders, recorded by Lawrence Brooks with George Trevare and his Australians on RZ Record G24764
- 1943 I Can Still See You Waving Good-Bye by Edna Morris, recorded by George Trevare & Orch
- 1943 Meant For Me by Chancery Lane, recorded by George Trevare's Australians with vocal chorus by Johnny Wade
- 1943 No One Can Take The Place Of You by Eric Aitken, recorded by Barbara James with George Trevare & his Australians on Regal-Zono Record G25779
- 1944 No Use by Glenn Marks, recorded by George Trevare & Orch on Regal-Zono Record G24873
- 1944 Under The Trees by Iris Mason & Hal Saunders, recorded by George Trevare & his Australians with vocals by Lawrence Brooks
- 1944 No Love No Nothin’
- 1944 Let's Have One For The Road
- 1944 Blue Velvet with vocals by Johnny Fitzgerald
- 1944 You're My Lucky Break by Iris Mason & Hal Saunders, recorded by George Trevare & Orch on Regal-Zono Record G24845
- 1944 The View Look's [sic] Good From Here by Barbara James, recorded by Joan Clarke with Orchestra conducted by George Trevare on Regal-Zono Record G24862
- 1945 Sailing Home - original composition by George Trevare, featured by Australian radio artists Len Davis and Ern Oyston
- 1945 arr. One of these days by Joe Slater
- 1945 arr. The Silver in my Mother's Hair by Vince Courtney
- 1945 arr. 'Curl The Moe Uncle Joe' by Jack Lumsdaine
- 1945 arr. "Am I?" by Jack Lumsdaine
- 1945 The man from the snowy river : a modern fantasy
- 1945 Waltzing Matilda with radio 2GB dance orchestra
- 1945 Chickery Chick by Sylvia Dee & Sidney Lippman, recorded by George Trevare & Orch on Regal-Zono Record G25015
- 1946 I Love You More And More With Every Breath I Take by Eric Aitken, recorded by George Trevare
- 1947 arr. of songs by Letty Katts and Eric Aitken
- 1947 Back to Croajingalong arr. music Dunlop, Pat (composer) and Lind, Alice (lyricist)
- 1947 They Said It Wouldn't Last - original composition by George Trevare, recorded by George Trevare & Orch on Columbia Record DO X844
- 1947 Love And Hate - original composition by George Trevare, recorded by George Trevare & Orch on Columbia Record DO 2996
- 1947 Sandra by Eric Aitken, recorded by George Trevare & Orch on Columbia Record DO 3094
- 1949 Sea Breezes - original composition by George Trevare, recorded by George Trevare & Orch on Columbia Record DO 3240
- 1949 No! No! - original composition by George Trevare, recorded by radio star Brian Lawrence
- 1951 The Chicken Song (I Ain't Gonna Take It Settin' Down) by Terry Shand & Bob Merrill, recorded by George Trevare & Orch on Parlophone Record A7765
- 1952 “I’m Looking Over A Four Leaf Clover”.
- 1956 Innamorate
- 1956 The Rock And Roll Waltz
- 1956 Always Take A Girl Named Daisy
- 1956 A Bushel And A Peck
