= Joe Valino =

American singer (1929–1996)

Joseph Paolino Jr. (March 9, 1929 – December 26, 1996), better known as Joe Valino, was an American singer who had a chart hit in 1957 with "The Garden of Eden".

Born in Philadelphia, Pennsylvania, United States, the son of Mary and Joseph Paolino, he learned piano and guitar and began performing in local clubs as a child. While still in his teens, he accompanied Sarah Vaughan in piano, and by the age of 18 had performed as a singer and pianist with the big bands of Woody Herman and Tommy Dorsey. After a spell as a professional boxer, he returned to the music business in the early 1950s, and local composer Dolores "Vicki" Silvers wrote the song "Learnin' the Blues" for him to record. He released the song in 1954 on the local Gold Star label (not the Texas label of the same name), and it became locally successful. Valino's version was then heard by Frank Sinatra, who recorded it himself and had a No. 1 hit with the song.

Valino's version drew him to the attention of RCA Records, and he recorded the song "The Garden of Eden", written by Dennise Norwood, for its subsidiary Vik Records label in 1956. Recorded with the George Siravo Orchestra, the song reached No. 12 on the Billboard pop chart the following year, and also reached No. 23 in the UK Singles Chart, where a cover version by Frankie Vaughan reached the No. 1 spot. While "The Garden of Eden" was on the charts, a former girlfriend of Valino claimed that he had arranged for her to have an illegal abortion. He denied the charge, but was convicted, and received a 17-year probation. As a result, his music was removed from sale and banned from radio play.

He continued to perform in clubs, and moved to Hollywood in the 1960s to pursue an acting career. He appeared in the movies Girl in Gold Boots (1969) and The Commitment (1976). In 1977, he suffered a major heart attack, followed by a series of strokes that left him unable to sing. He returned to Philadelphia, and died in 1996 at the age of 67.
