= Australian Record Company =

Australian record label and company

The Australian Record Company (ARC) was a record label and manufacturer later acquired by CBS Records International.

== History ==
ARC was originally known as Featuradio, a company formed in 1933 by George Sutton and his brother-in-law James M. Sayer. They sold the business in 1936, and Sutton continued to work there until it became The Australian Record Company (ARC) in 1938. At the time, ARC shared a studio with the radio station 2GB in Sydney and produced transcription discs for radio broadcast, and later began pressing and distributing records. They created original radio programs directed by Gordon Grimsdale.

In 1949, ARC started two new labels, Rodeo and Pacific. Rodeo released music by Reg Lindsay and recordings of Tex Morton while Pacific produced local versions of pop songs from Capitol Records, but Pacific stopped when ARC purchased the rights to distribute the London Records and Capitol Records catalogue in Australia in 1951. They later sold its rights to Capitol to EMI.

In 1953, The Australian Record Company became The Australian Record Company Limited, and released the first 10" LP and first 45 RPM record in Australia. They acquired the license to press records from the US Columbia Records, and did so under the name Coronet.

ARC was the largest record company in Australia in 1960 and employed 167 people at the time. That year, ARC was acquired by CBS Records International and changed their name to CBS Records Australia in 1977. By the end of the 1980s, the company had become Sony Music Australia, and later Sony Music Entertainment (Australia) Limited.

== General references ==
- The Australian 45rpm Revolution
- THE CAPITOL RECORD STORY, Barrier Miner (16 Oct 1954) Page 6
- The Australian Record Company at Milesago
