= Darryl Stewart =

Australian singer (born 1930)

- Born: 15 May 1930; Sydney, Australia
- Occupation: Musician
- Instrument: Vocals

Darryl Stewart (born 15 May 1930) is an Australian singer who had a number 1 hit in 1955 with "A Man Called Peter", becoming the first Australian to top the local charts. That single was the first 45-rpm release in Australia. Stewart had many releases over the years, appeared often on TV and worked in stage musicals. He worked in the USA for a period in the late 1950s. In January 1957 he married Janet Cook, daughter of W. Cook. Stewart was a regular on The Bobby Limb Show.
