= Learnin' the Blues =

Single by Frank Sinatra
- B-side: "If I Had Three Wishes"
- Released: April 18, 1955
- Recorded: 1955
- Studio: Capitol Studios, Hollywood, California
- Genre: Traditional pop
- Length: 2:59
- Label: Capitol
- Composer(s): Dolores "Vicki" Silvers

Frank Sinatra singles chronology
"Two Hearts, Two Kisses (Make One Love)" (1955)	"Learnin' the Blues" (1955)	"Not as a Stranger" (1955)

"Learnin' the Blues" is a big band popular song written by Dolores "Vicki" Silvers. The song was originally recorded by Philadelphia singer Joe Valino, along with the Gene Kutch Orchestra.

== Frank Sinatra versions ==
In 1955, "Learnin' the Blues" was recorded by Frank Sinatra with Nelson Riddle & his Orchestra. Initially published on the B side of the EP Session With Sinatra (Capitol Records EAP 1-629), Learnin' the Blues was subsequently re-released in June 1955 as a single with Sinatra's If I Had Three Wishes on the B side (Capitol 3102).

In 1962, Frank Sinatra recorded a longer version in collaboration with Count Basie & his orchestra for the Sinatra–Basie: An Historic Musical First album.

== Chart performance ==
In the weeks of 3–9 and 24–30 July 1955, Sinatra's rendition was briefly the most frequently played song on U.S. radio. The single's sales peaked at #2 on the NME British charts in August 1955, and at #1 on the Australian charts for the week of 13–19 November 1955. In cumulative year-end charts for 1955, Learnin' the Blues ranked #14 (Billboard Year-End) in the United States and #17 (NME Year-End) in the United Kingdom. Sinatra re-recorded the song in 1962 for the album Sinatra-Basie.
