= Paul Anka =

Canadian and American singer and actor (born 1941)

Paul Anka OC
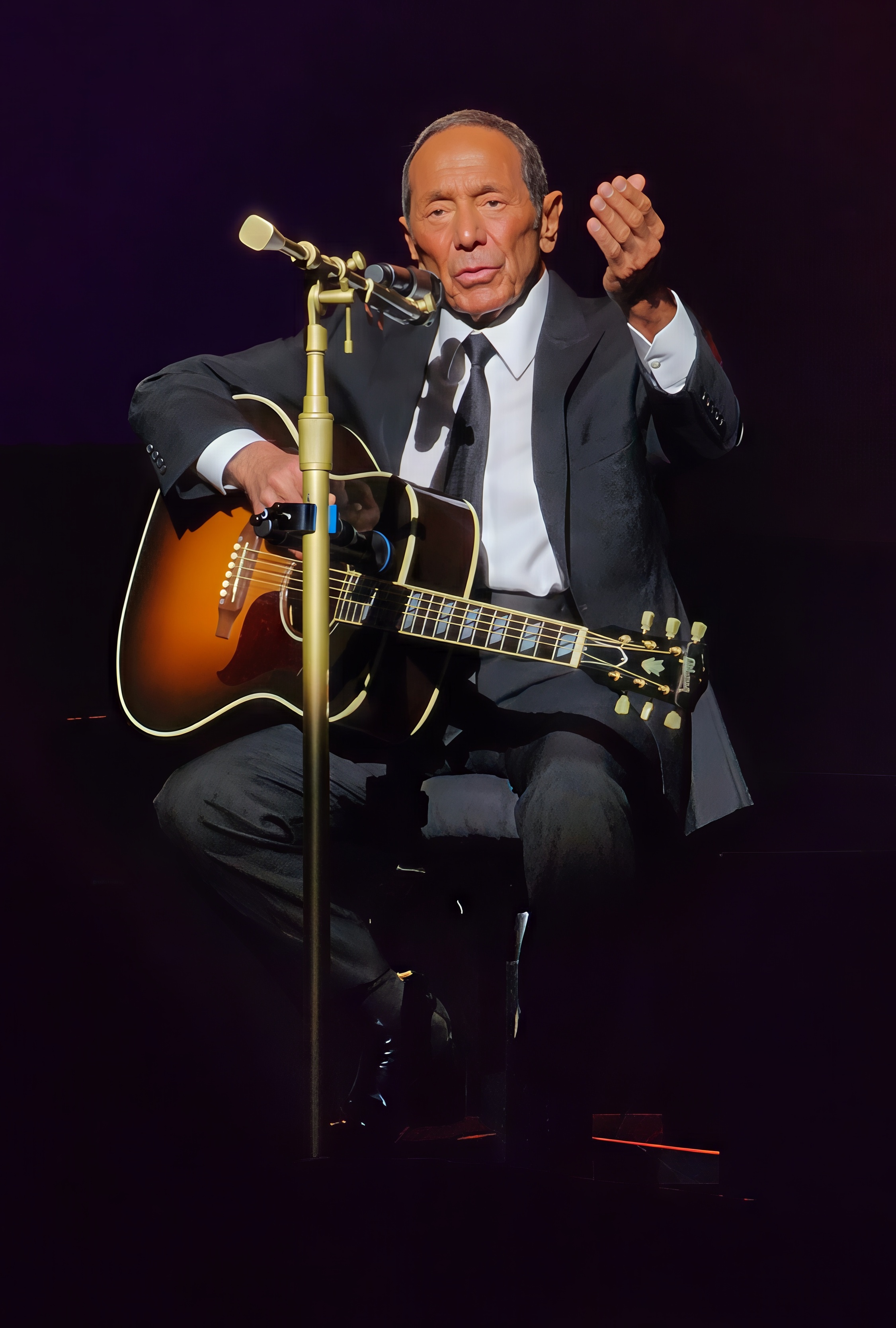
- Anka performing at Caesars Windsor Hotel and Casino in Windsor, Ontario in May 2024
- Born: Paul Albert Anka; July 30, 1941 (age 85); Ottawa, Ontario, Canada
- Citizenship: Canada; United States
- Occupations: Singer-songwriter; actor
- Years active: 1955–present
- Spouses: Anne de Zogheb (m. 1963; div. 2000) Anna Åberg (m. 2008; div. 2010) Lisa Pemberton (m. 2016; div. 2020)
- Children: 6
- Relatives: Jason Bateman (son-in-law)
- Musical career
- Genres: Pop; soft rock; jazz; doo-wop; rock and roll; swing
- Labels: ABC-Paramount Records; EMI Columbia; Artone; RCA Victor; United Artists Records; Columbia Records; Buddah Records; Warner Bros. Records
- Website: paulanka.com

Paul Albert Anka (born July 30, 1941) is a Canadian and American singer-songwriter and actor. His songs include "Diana", "You Are My Destiny", "Lonely Boy", "Put Your Head on My Shoulder" and "(You're) Having My Baby".

Anka also wrote the theme for The Tonight Show Starring Johnny Carson; one of Tom Jones' biggest hits, "She's a Lady"; and the English lyrics to Claude François and Jacques Revaux's music for Frank Sinatra's signature song "My Way", which has been recorded by many artists including Elvis Presley. He co-wrote three songs with Michael Jackson: "This Is It" (originally titled "I Never Heard"), "Love Never Felt So Good", and "Don't Matter to Me", which became posthumous hits for Jackson in 2009, 2014, and 2018, respectively.

== Early life ==
Paul Albert Anka was born in Ottawa, Ontario, to Camelia (née Tannis) and Andrew Emile "Andy" Anka Sr., who owned a restaurant called Locanda. According to Paul's autobiography, My Way, both of his parents were of Lebanese Christian descent; however, he also states in his autobiography that his paternal ancestors came from Bab Tuma, in Syria. His father came to Canada from Damascus, Syria, and his mother was an immigrant from Lebanon from the village of Kfarmishki. Anka has a brother and sister. His mother died when he was 18, due to liver complications from diabetes.

Paul Anka briefly studied piano under Winifred Rees and sang with the St. Elias Antiochian Orthodox Cathedral choir under the direction of Frederick Karam, with whom he studied music theory in Ottawa. He attended Fisher Park High School in the city, where he was part of a vocal trio called the Bobby Soxers.

== Career ==
=== Early success ===
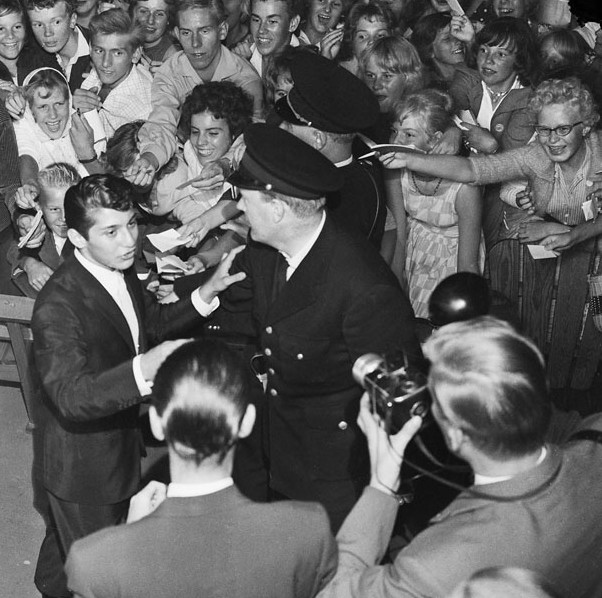
Anka at Gröna Lund, an amusement park in Stockholm, 1959

Anka recorded his first single, "I Confess", when he was 14. In 1956, with $100 given to him by his uncle, he went to Manhattan, New York City, where he auditioned for Don Costa at ABC Records, singing what was widely believed to be a lovestruck verse he had written to a former babysitter. In an interview with Terry Gross of NPR in 2005, he said that it was to a girl at his church whom he hardly knew. The resulting song "Diana" brought Anka stardom as it went to No. 1 on the Canadian and U.S. music charts. "Diana" is one of the best selling singles ever by a Canadian recording artist. He followed up with four songs which made it into the Top 20 in 1958, including "It's Time to Cry", which reached No. 4 and "(All of a Sudden) My Heart Sings", which was No. 15, making him (at 17) one of the biggest teen idols of the time. He toured Britain and Australia with Buddy Holly. Anka also wrote "It Doesn't Matter Anymore"–a song written for Holly, which Holly recorded just before he died in 1959. Shortly afterward Anka said:

"It Doesn't Matter Anymore" has a tragic irony about it now, but at least it will help look after Buddy Holly's family. I'm giving my composer's royalty to his widow – it's the least I can do.

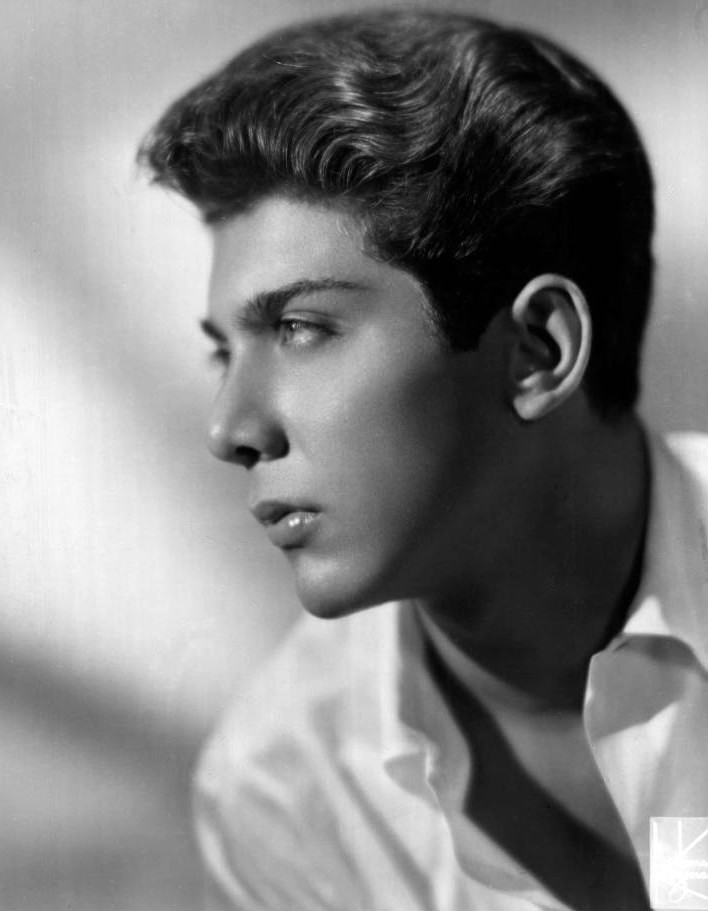
Anka in 1961

Anka composed the theme for The Tonight Show Starring Johnny Carson (reworked in 1962 from a song Anka wrote earlier called "Toot Sweet"; it had been rewritten with lyrics and recorded by Annette Funicello in 1959 as "It's Really Love"). He wrote "Teddy" – a Top 20 hit for Connie Francis in 1960. Anka wrote the English lyrics to "My Way", Frank Sinatra's signature song (originally the French song "Comme d'habitude"). In the 1960s, Anka began acting in motion pictures as well as writing songs for them, most notably the theme for the hit film The Longest Day (which also was the official march of the Canadian Airborne Regiment), in which he made a cameo appearance as a U.S. Army Ranger. For his film work he wrote and recorded one of his greatest hits "Lonely Boy". He also wrote and recorded "My Home Town", which was a No. 8 pop hit for him the same year. He then became one of the first pop singers to perform at casinos in Las Vegas. In 1960, he appeared twice as himself in NBC's short-lived crime drama Dan Raven.

In 1963, Anka purchased the rights and ownership of his ABC-Paramount catalog and re-recorded his earlier hits for RCA Victor, which he had joined in 1960.

=== 1970s breakthrough and chart comebacks ===
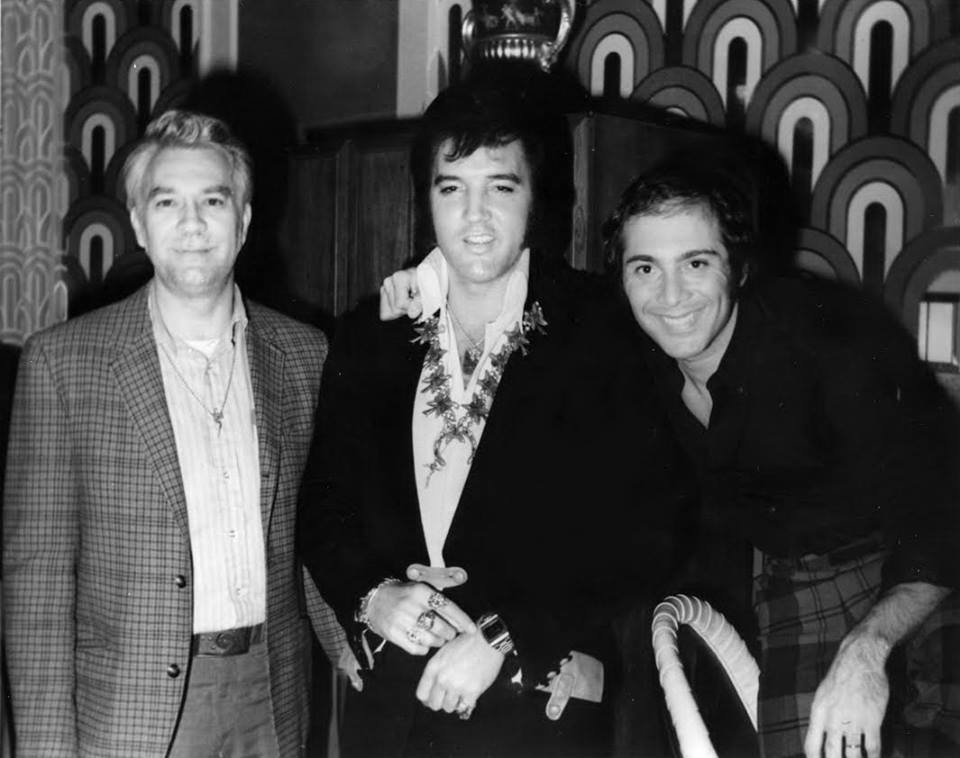
Paul Anka (right) with friends Bill Porter (left) and Elvis Presley backstage at the Las Vegas Hilton on August 5, 1972

Frustrated after more than ten years without a top 25 hit record, Anka switched labels again, which marked a turning point in his career. This time he signed with United Artists and in 1974 teamed up with Odia Coates to record the No. 1 hit, "(You're) Having My Baby", exposing Anka to a new generation of fans and proving his staying power among his original fan base that was now maturing.

Anka also wrote five songs which were included on an album by Don Goodwin.

Anka and Coates recorded three more duets that made it into the Top 20: "One Man Woman/One Woman Man" (No. 7), "I Don't Like to Sleep Alone" (No. 8), and the No. 15 duet "(I Believe) There's Nothing Stronger Than Our Love". In 1975, he recorded a jingle for Kodak written by Bill Lane (lyrics) and Roger Nichols (melody) called "Times of Your Life". It became so popular Anka recorded it as a full song, which peaked at No. 7 in the US pop chart in 1976. The follow-up was another hit that Anka wrote for Sinatra, "Anytime (I'll Be There)", peaking at No. 33. Anka's last Top 40 hit in the US was in the summer of 1983: "Hold Me 'Til the Mornin' Comes", which included backing vocals from then-Chicago frontman Peter Cetera; it hit No. 2 on the Hot Adult Contemporary chart.

=== 1990s comeback ===
Anka's 1998 album A Body of Work was his first new U.S. studio release since Walk a Fine Line in 1983; vocalists and performers included Celine Dion, Kenny G, Patti LaBelle, and Skyler Jett. The album included a new version of "Hold Me 'Til the Mornin' Comes", once again performed with Peter Cetera. In 2005, Anka released an album of big-band arrangements of contemporary Rock songs titled, Rock Swings; the album provided a mainstream comeback of sorts which saw him awarded a star on Canada's Walk of Fame in Toronto.

On October 12, 2009, Anka stated Michael Jackson's new release titled "This Is It" was a collaborative effort between the two in 1980. According to Anka, after recording the song, Jackson decided not to use it and the tune was then recorded and released by Sa-Fire. After Anka threatened to sue for credit and a share of royalties, the administrators of Jackson's estate granted Anka 50% of the copyright. An additional song that Jackson co-wrote with Anka from this 1980 session, "Love Never Felt So Good", was discovered shortly thereafter. His album Songs of December charted at No. 58 in Canada in November 2011.

=== Italy ===
Anka collaborated with a number of Italian musicians, including composer/director Ennio Morricone, singer-songwriter Lucio Battisti, and lyricist Mogol. His official discography reports nine singles released by RCA Italiana, but the Italian charts list at least six other songs he interpreted or recorded in Italian. His top hit was "Ogni giorno" which scored No. 1 in 1962, followed by "Piangerò per te" and "Ogni volta", which reached both No. 2, in 1963 and 1964. "Ogni volta" ("Every Time") was sung by Anka during the Sanremo Music Festival 1964 and then sold more than one million copies in Italy alone; it was also awarded a gold disc.

Anka returned to Sanremo in 1968 with "La farfalla impazzita" by Battisti-Mogol. On that occasion, the same title was interpreted by Italian crooner Johnny Dorelli. The pair of singers, however, were eliminated before the final stage of the musical contest. In 2006, he recorded a duet with 1960s Italian hitmaker Adriano Celentano, a new cover of "Diana", with Italian lyrics by Celentano-Mogol and with singer-songwriter Alex Britti on the guitar. The song hit No. 3.

=== Finland ===
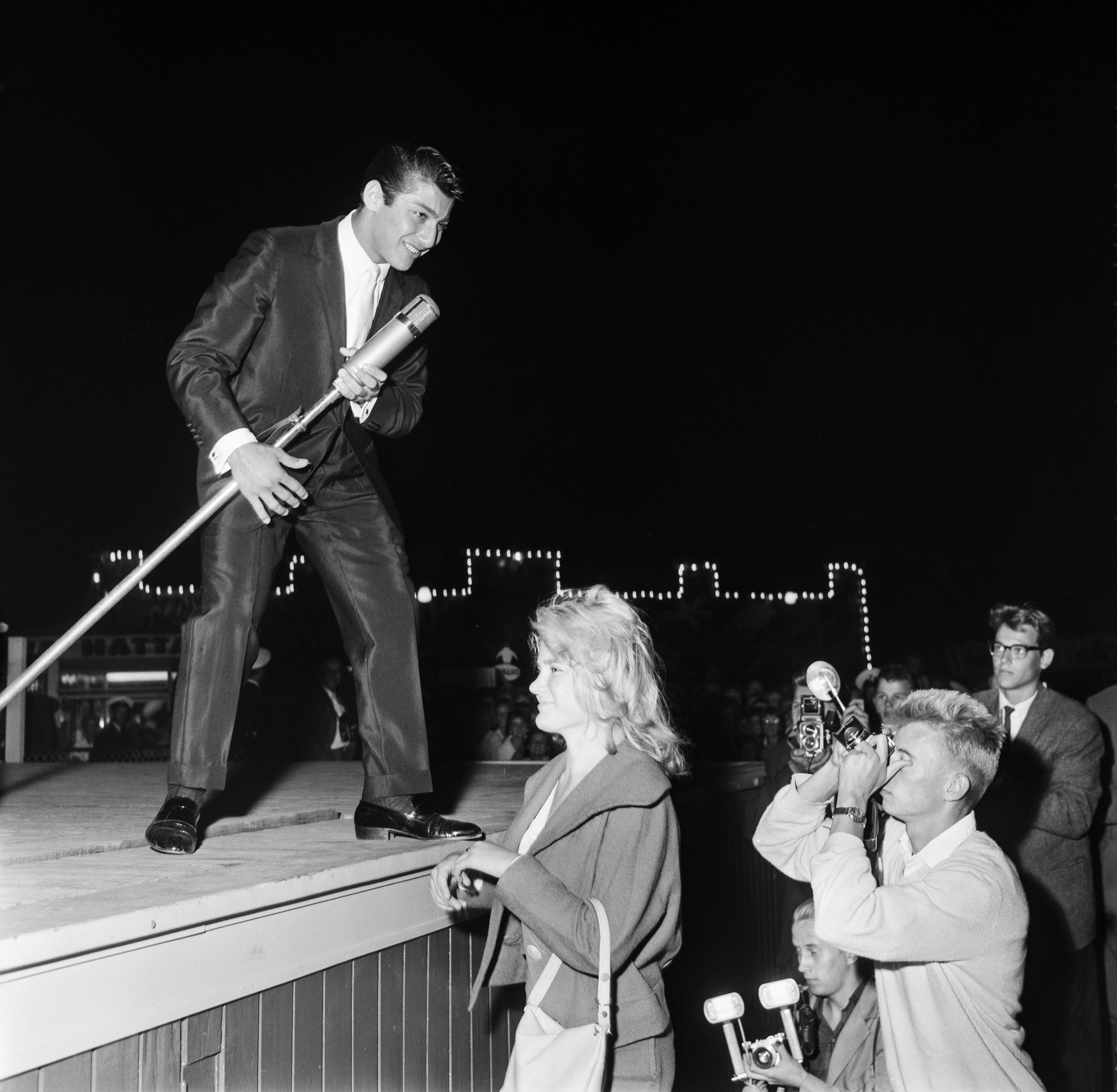
Paul Anka posing for a camera at Linnanmäki summer concert on August 19, 1959, in Helsinki, Finland

Anka has been popular in Finland since the beginning of his career. He performed in Helsinki's Linnanmäki in 1959, in Lappeenranta in 1989, at the Pori Jazz Festival in Pori on 19 July 2007 and in 2012, and in Tampere three times on 6 August 2008 and on 9 and 10 August 2009. He also appeared in the Las Vegas scene in the 1991 Finnish film Prince of the Hit Parade (Iskelmäprinssi), directed by Juha Tapaninen. At the end of the film there is an archive footage of Anka's performance in Linnanmäki. As background music, Anka performs his song "How Long" in the film.

=== Other countries ===
With less success than in Italy and Finland, Anka tried the French market as well, with his first song being "Comme Avant" with Mireille Mathieu. In 1964, he released an album titled Paul Anka à Paris; the six tracks on side B were sung in French. A single release in Japanese ("Kokoro no Sasae"/"Shiawase e no Tabiji") is also reported on his discography. In 1993, he recorded a duet with Filipino singer Regine Velasquez titled "It's Hard to Say Goodbye", included on her album Reason Enough. This song was re-recorded several years later by Anka and Celine Dion and was included on his album A Body of Work.

Anka has performed four times in Israel, and in 2019 rejected pleas that he boycott the country.

== Acting career ==
Anka appeared as himself in 1958's "Let's Rock", where he sang and appeared in a scene signing autographs. His acting debut was as a teen idol in Girls Town (1959). He made a cameo appearance as an army private in The Longest Day (1962). He also composed the title song to the film. During the late 1950s and early 1960s, he starred in such teen exploitation films including Look in Any Window (1961), in which he played a peeping Tom. He later played an Elvis-hating casino pit manager in 3000 Miles to Graceland (2001) and a yacht broker in Captain Ron (1992). He guest-starred as a murder suspect in the Perry Mason television movie, The Case of the Maligned Mobster (1991). He made guest appearances as himself in the episode "Red's Last Day" on That '70s Show and in "The Real Paul Anka" episode of Gilmore Girls. He made several appearances on the NBC TV series Las Vegas. In 2016, he made another guest appearance as himself in the "Spring" episode of Gilmore Girls: A Year in the Life, a revival of the original show.

=== Other film and television appearances ===
Anka was the subject of the 1962 NFB documentary Lonely Boy, considered a classic work of cinéma vérité. In 1976, Anka hosted a television special, Paul Anka's Superstars, a music showcase that eventually was repackaged as an episode of The Midnight Special. He wrote and performed songs in the 1985 Canadian children's Christmas cartoon George and the Christmas Star. He appeared on The Simpsons season 7 episode Treehouse of Horror VI, Attack of the 50 Ft Eyesore, singing a song with Lisa in October 1995. In American Idol's seasons 2 and 3, he made a special appearance and sang an adapted version of "My Way" which mocked the format of the show as well as participants, judges, and the host. The performance was praised as one of the best moments of the show. He also played the role of Buddy Maus in Season 2 Episode 14 "The Betrayal" of the TV show Kojak.

Anka appeared in an episode of The Morecambe & Wise Show in 1970, singing his own lyrics to 'My Way'. The show was broadcast again on BBC2 on Christmas Day 2021, after the tape recording-believed lost - was found. Anka appeared as himself in the American sitcom That 70s Show in season 2, episode 2 "Red’s Last Day".

On Gilmore Girls, Lorelai Gilmore named her Polish Lowland Sheepdog after Anka. Series co-creator Daniel Palladino chose the name after hearing the Rock Swings album at a coffeehouse. Both Paul Ankas were featured in a dream sequence Lorelai described to her daughter Rory in the cold open to "The Real Paul Anka", the eighteenth episode of Season 6. Anka competed in season four of The Masked Singer as "Broccoli". He finished in 7th place exiting during the Group C finals.

== Personal life ==
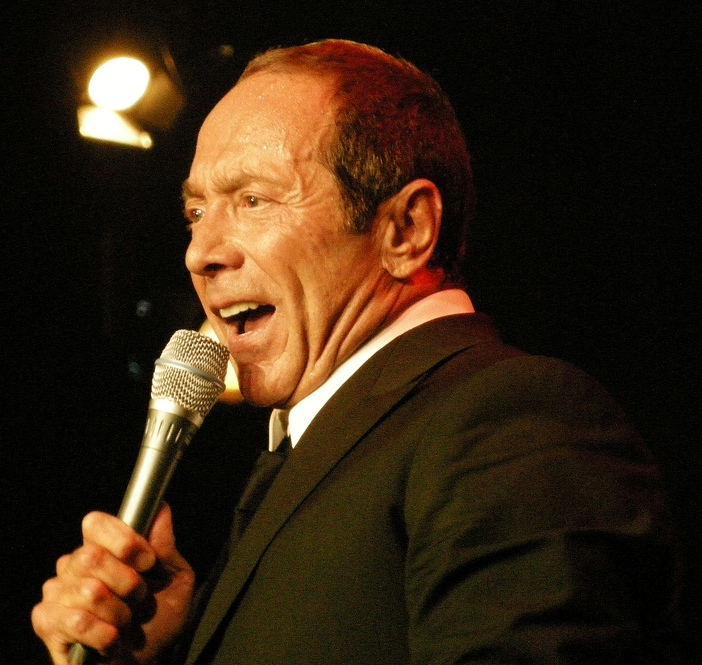
Anka, 2007

Anka is the father of six children: five daughters (all with ex-wife Anne de Zogheb) and one son Ethan (with ex-wife Anna Åberg).

Anka was married to Anne de Zogheb, the half-English and half-Lebanese daughter of Lebanese diplomat Charles de Zogheb, from February 16, 1963, until October 2, 2000. The couple met in 1962 in San Juan, Puerto Rico, where she was a fashion model on assignment and under contract to the Eileen Ford Agency. Zogheb, brought up in Egypt, is of Lebanese, English, Dutch, French, German, and Greek descent. The couple married the following year in a ceremony at Paris-Orly Airport. Through their daughter, Amanda, he is the father-in-law of Jason Bateman, an actor. On September 6, 1990, Anka became a naturalized citizen of the United States. From 1971 to 1993, Anka owned property near the Tropicana Country Club golf course.

In 2008, Anka married his personal trainer, Anna Åberg, in Sardinia, Italy. They divorced in 2010, and he has full custody of their son. Anna was featured in the Swedish TV3 show Svenska Hollywoodfruar (Swedish Hollywood Wives). Paul Anka's autobiography, My Way, co-written with David Dalton, was published in 2013.

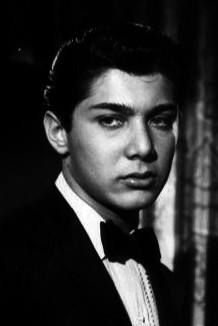
Anka in a cameo role for the crime drama television show Dan Raven, 1960

In October 2016, Anka and Lisa Pemberton married in Beverly Hills, California. They divorced in 2020.

== Awards and honours ==
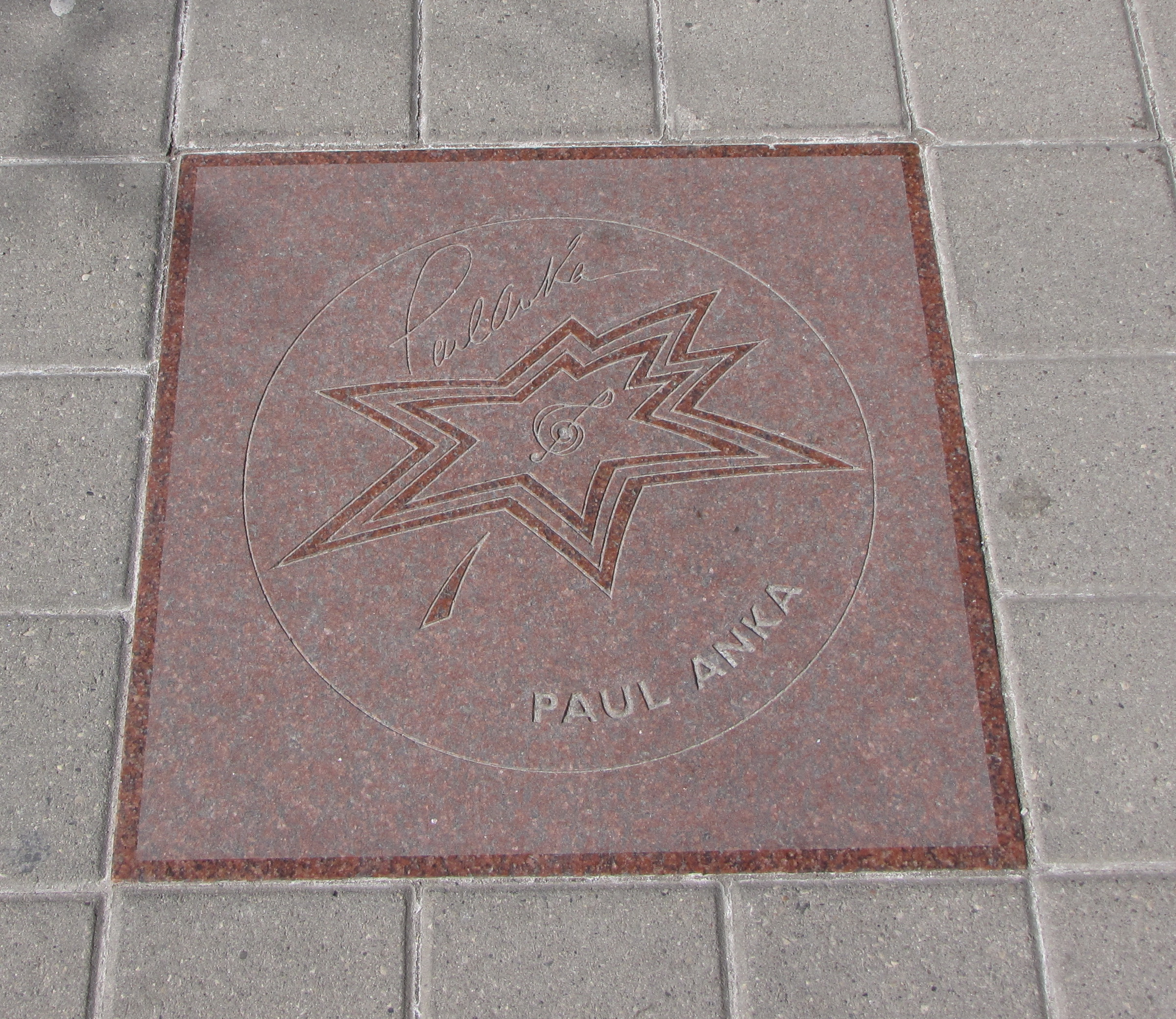
Anka's star on Canada's Walk of Fame

In 1972, a street in Ottawa was named Paul Anka Drive. In 1981, the Ottawa City Council named August 26 as "Paul Anka Day" to celebrate his quarter-century in show business.

In 2004, he was appointed an Officer Of The Order of Canada.

In 2026, he was named a recipient of Kennedy Center Honors by President Donald Trump.

== In popular culture ==
In the mid-1980s, Anka was secretly recorded while he launched a tirade against his crew and band members, berating them for behavior that he considered unprofessional. When asked about it on the interview program Fresh Air, he referred to the person who did the recording as a "snake we later fired". The recording became widely known after being uploaded to the internet around 2004, and a number of quotes from it became famous, including "The guys get shirts!"; "Don't make a maniac out of me!"; and "Slice like a __ hammer!" Some of the quotes were reproduced by Al Pacino's character in the 2007 film Ocean's Thirteen. In the TV show Gilmore Girls, Lorelai Gilmore names her dog Paul Anka.

== Business ventures ==
In 2012, Anka co-founded the holographic tech startup, ARHT Media. He is a member of ARHT Media's Board of Advisors, alongside businessman Kevin O'Leary and former prime minister Brian Mulroney until Mulroney's death in February, 2024.

== Discography ==
=== Albums ===
Year	Title	Label	Format	US	Certifications
1958	Paul Anka	ABC Paramount	LP		-
1959	My Heart Sings	ABC Paramount	CD, LP	-	-
1960	Swings for Young Lovers	ABC Paramount	CD, LP	-	-
1961	It's Christmas Everywhere	ABC Paramount	LP	-	-
1962	Young, Alive and in Love!	RCA Victor	LP	61	-
1962	Let's Sit This One Out	RCA Victor	LP	137	-
1963	15 Songs I Wish I'd Written	RCA Victor	LP	-	-
1963	3 Great Guys (Paul Anka, Sam Cooke and Neil Sedaka)	RCA Victor	LP	-	-
1963	Our Man Around the World	RCA Victor	LP	-	-
1963	Italiano	RCA Victor	LP	-	-
1964	A Casa Nostra	RCA Victor	LP	-	-
1968	Goodnight My Love	RCA Victor	LP	101	-
1969	Life Goes On	RCA Victor	LP	194	-
1972	Paul Anka	Buddah Records	CD, LP	188	-
1972	Jubilation	Buddah	CD, LP	192	-
1974	Anka	United Artists Records	CD, LP	9	Gold
1975	Feelings	United Artists	CD, LP	36	-
1975	Times of Your Life (nine of 10 cuts from previous two albums)	United Artists	LP	22	Gold
1976	The Painter	United Artists	CD, LP	85	-
1977	The Music Man	United Artists	LP	195	-
1978	Listen to Your Heart	RCA Victor	CD, LP	179	-
1979	Headlines	RCA Victor	CD, LP	-	-
1981	Both Sides of Love	RCA Victor	LP	171	-
1983	Walk a Fine Line	Columbia Records	CD, LP	156	-
1987	Freedom for the World (titled Freedom in Canada)	A&M Records	CD, LP	-	-
1989	Somebody Loves You	Polydor Records	CD	-	-
1996	Amigos (Duets in Spanish)	Sony	CD	-	-
2005	Rock Swings	Verve Records	CD	120 (9 UK)	-
2007	Classic Songs, My Way	Decca Records	CD	139	-
2011	Songs of December	Decca	CD	-	-
2013	Duets	Sony	CD	95	-
2021	Making Memories	Paul Anka Productions, Greenhill	CD, Album, Stereo	-	-
2026	Inspirations of Life and Love	Paul Anka Productions, Greenhill	CD, Album, Stereo	-	-

== Filmography ==
Year	Title	Role	Notes
1958	Let's Rock	Himself	
1959	Verboten!	Himself, behind opening credits	Sang "Verboten!"
1959	Girls Town	Jimmy Parlow	Wrote and Sang "Lonely Boy"
1960	The Private Lives of Adam & Eve	Pinkie Parker	Wrote and Sung "Adam and Eve"
1961	Look in Any Window	Craig Fowler	
1961	The Seasons of Youth	Himself	TV documentary
1961	Make Room for Daddy	Paul Pryor	Season 8, episode 25: "Old Man Danny"
1962	The Longest Day	U.S. Army Ranger	
1964	Valentine's Day	Gerald Larson	TV series
1965	The Red Skelton Hour	Bonnie Prince Gorgeous	Episode 25: "Nuts of the Round Table"
1974	Kojak	Buddy Maus	Season 2, episode 14: "The Betrayal"
1976	Paul Anka's Superstars	Host	TV special, aired as part of The Midnight Special
1977	Lindsay Wagner: Another Side of Me	Himself	TV special
1982	The Paul Anka Show	Host	TV series
1983	The Fall Guy	Vic Madison	Season 3, episode 7: "Dirty Laundry"
1987	Crime Story	Anthony 'Tony' Dio	Season 1, episode 20: "Top of the World"
1991	Perry Mason: The Case of the Maligned Mobster	Nick Angel	TV movie
1991	Prince of the Hit Parade	Himself	
1992	Captain Ron	Yacht Broker Donaldson	
1993	Ordinary Magic	Joey Dean	
1994	Shake, Rattle and Rock!	Himself	TV movie; Special appearance
1995	The Simpsons	Himself (voice)	Season 7, episode 6: "Treehouse of Horror VI
1996	Mad Dog Time	Danny Marks	
1999	That '70s Show	Himself	Season 2, episode 2: "Red's Last Day"
2001	3000 Miles to Graceland	Pit Boss #1	
2005	Las Vegas	Himself	Season 3, episode 2: "Fake the Money and Run"
2006	Gilmore Girls	Himself	Season 6, episode 18: "The Real Paul Anka"
2016	Gilmore Girls: A Year in the Life	Himself	Miniseries, episode 2: "Spring"
2020	The Masked Singer	Broccoli	Season 4; Eliminated in episode 9
2020	Jay Sebring....Cutting to the Truth	Himself	Documentary
2024	Times Square Ball	Himself	Sang John Lennon’s Imagine before the ball drop
