= Olivia Newton-John's Greatest Hits =

Greatest hits album by Olivia Newton-John
- Released: October 1977
- Recorded: 1971–1976
- Genres: Country; pop
- Length: 37:58
- Label: MCA
- Producer: John Farrar

Olivia Newton-John chronology
Making a Good Thing Better (1977)	Olivia Newton-John's Greatest Hits (1977)	Grease (1978)

Olivia Newton-John's Greatest Hits is a greatest hits album released by Olivia Newton-John in 1977. In Australasia, it was released as Greatest Hits Vol. 2 as an extension of the 1974 compilation First Impressions, while in other regions, it fully spanned Newton-John's career up to the point of release.

The international edition of the album collected all of Newton-John's American Top 40 singles released between 1971 and 1977. "Changes" was the only track not released as a single, but it was one of Newton-John's first self-written songs that she recorded. The album became Newton-John's first to be certified platinum in the United States and peaked at number 13 on the Billboard 200 and number seven on the Top Country Albums chart. It ended up being certified double Platinum in the US and Platinum in the UK and Canada, as well as Gold in Hong Kong.

== Reception ==
Cash Box magazine called it "twelve of her best-loved numbers and some breathtaking photographs of one of contemporary music's most photogenic personalities all in one package. An excellent and well-rounded introduction to Olivia's work for those who have yet to be captivated by her wholesome charm and sweet sounding vocal style.".

In their review, Billboard called the album "a long awaited and well deserved greatest hits set, with all but one of the cuts having made the Top 40. The material ranges horn Olivia's 1971 creampuff folkie hit with Bob Dylan's "If Not For You" to her gutsy, throaty reading of the Bee Gees' "Come On Over." Also included are rollicking country hits, exquisitely arranged, plaintive MOR songs; easy tempo supper club tunes and spry Top 40 hits."

== Track listing ==
=== Side one ===
1. "If Not for You" (Bob Dylan) – 2:50
  From If Not for You
2. "Changes" (Olivia Newton-John) – 2:27
  From Olivia
3. "Let Me Be There" (John Rostill) – 3:00
  From Let Me Be There / Music Makes My Day
4. "If You Love Me (Let Me Know)" (John Rostill) – 3:12
  From If You Love Me, Let Me Know
5. "I Honestly Love You" (Peter Allen, Jeff Barry) – 3:36
  From Long Live Love
6. "Have You Never Been Mellow" (John Farrar) – 3:28
  From Have You Never Been Mellow

=== Side two ===
1. "Please Mr. Please" (Bruce Welch and John Rostill) – 3:24
  From Have You Never Been Mellow
2. "Something Better to Do" (John Farrar) – 3:16
  From Clearly Love
3. "Let It Shine" (Linda Hargrove) – 2:26
  From Clearly Love
4. "Come On Over" (Barry Gibb, Robin Gibb) – 3:38
  From Come On Over
5. "Don't Stop Believin'" (John Farrar) – 3:37
  From Don't Stop Believin'
6. "Sam" (John Farrar, Hank Marvin, Don Black) – 3:41
  From Don't Stop Believin'

=== 2022 deluxe edition ===
1. "If Not for You" (Bob Dylan) – 2:53
  From If Not for You
2. "Banks of the Ohio" – 3:18
  From If Not for You
3. "Love Song" (Lesley Duncan) – 3:46
  From If Not for You
4. "Take Me Home, Country Roads" (Bill Danoff, John Denver, Taffy Nivert) – 3:23
  From Let Me Be There / Music Makes My Day
5. "Changes" (Olivia Newton-John) – 2:32
  From Olivia
6. "Let Me Be There" (John Rostill) – 3:01
  From Let Me Be There / Music Makes My Day
7. "If You Love Me (Let Me Know)" (John Rostill) – 3:15
  From If You Love Me, Let Me Know
8. "I Honestly Love You" (Peter Allen, Jeff Barry) – 3:40
  From Long Live Love
9. "Have You Never Been Mellow" (John Farrar) – 3:32
  From Have You Never Been Mellow
10. "Please Mr. Please" (Bruce Welch and John Rostill) – 3:25
  From Have You Never Been Mellow
11. "The Air That I Breathe" (Albert Hammond and Lee Hazlewood) – 3:52
  From Have You Never Been Mellow
12. "Something Better to Do" (John Farrar) – 3:18
  From Clearly Love
13. "Let It Shine" (Linda Hargrove) – 2:28
  From Clearly Love
14. "Every Face Tells a Story" (Linda Hargrove) – 3:59
  From Don't Stop Believin''
15. "Jolene" (Dolly Parton) – 3:02
  From Come On Over
16. "Come On Over" (Barry Gibb, Robin Gibb) – 3:42
  From Come On Over
17. "Don't Stop Believin'" (John Farrar) – 3:32
  From Don't Stop Believin'
18. "Sam" (John Farrar, Hank Marvin, Don Black) – 3:43
  From Don't Stop Believin'
19. "Don't Cry for Me Argentina" (Andrew Lloyd Webber, Tim Rice) – 6:01
  From Making a Good Thing Better
20. "Making a Good Thing Better" (Pete Wingfield) – 3:43
  From Making a Good Thing Better

== Charts ==
=== Weekly charts ===
Weekly chart performance for Olivia Newton-John's Greatest Hits
Chart (1977–1982)	Peak position
Australian (Kent Music Report)	18
Canada Top Albums/CDs (RPM)	11
Dutch Albums (Album Top 100)	24
Japanese Albums (Oricon)	5
UK Albums (Official Charts)	19
US Billboard 200	13
US Top Country Albums (Billboard)	7
US Cash Box Top Albums	24
US Cash Box Country Albums	4
New Zealand Albums (RMNZ)	10

2022 weekly chart performance for Olivia Newton-John's Greatest Hits
Chart (2022)	Peak position
Belgian Albums (Ultratop Wallonia)	163
US Top Album Sales (Billboard)	50

=== Year-end charts ===
1978 year-end chart performance for Olivia Newton-John's Greatest Hits
Chart (1978)	Position
US Top Country Albums (Billboard)	33

== Certifications and sales ==
Region	Certification	Certified units/sales
Australia (ARIA)	2× Platinum	100,000^{^}
Canada (Music Canada)	Platinum	100,000^{^}
Hong Kong (IFPI Hong Kong)	Gold	10,000^{*}
United Kingdom (BPI)	Platinum	300,000^{^}
United States (RIAA)	2× Platinum	2,000,000^{^}
^{*} Sales figures based on certification alone.^{^} Shipments figures based on certification alone.
