= First Impressions (album) =

Compilation album by Olivia Newton-John
- Released: 1974
- Genre: Pop rock; country
- Label: EMI; Interfusion
- Producer: John Farrar

Olivia Newton-John chronology
Long Live Love (1974)	First Impressions (1974)	Have You Never Been Mellow (1975)

Professional ratings
Review scores
Source	Rating
AllMusic	2.5/5 stars

First Impressions is a compilation album by Australian singer Olivia Newton-John, released in 1974 on the EMI label. The collection presents the main hits of the singer, recorded from 1971 to 1974 – songs from the first four studio albums (including If You Love Me, Let Me Know, which was released in North America only).

In Japan, the album was released under the title Let Me Be There and the same cover as on the original album. In Australia and New Zealand, the album was released by Interfusion Records under the title Great Hits! First Impressions and with a modified tracklist (songs from the album Long Live Love were added).

== Track listing ==
First Impressions track listing
No.	Title	Writer(s)	Length
1.	"If Not for You"	Bob Dylan	2:45
2.	"Banks of the Ohio"	Traditional	3:08
3.	"Love Song"	Lesley Duncan	3:35
4.	"Winterwood"	Don McLean	2:42
5.	"Everything I Own"	David Gates	2:53
6.	"What Is Life"	George Harrison	3:13
7.	"Take Me Home, Country Roads"	Bill Danoff; John Denver; Taffy Nivert	3:10
8.	"Amoureuse"	Véronique Sanson; Gary Osborne	3:29
9.	"Let Me Be There"	John Rostill	2:51
10.	"Changes"	Olivia Newton-John	2:23
11.	"Music Makes My Day"	John Farrar	3:03
12.	"If You Love Me (Let Me Know)"	Rostill	3:05
Total length:			36:17

Great Hits! First Impressions track listing
No.	Title	Writer(s)	Length
1.	"If Not for You"	Dylan	2:45
2.	"Banks of the Ohio"	Traditional	3:08
3.	"Winterwood"	McLean	2:42
4.	"Take Me Home, Country Roads"	Danoff; Denver; Nivert	3:10
5.	"Amoureuse"	Sanson; Osborne	3:29
6.	"Let Me Be There"	Rostill	2:51
7.	"I Honestly Love You"	Jeff Barry; Peter Allen	3:37
8.	"Long Live Love"	Valerie Avon; Harold Spiro	2:47
9.	"If You Love Me (Let Me Know)"	Rostill	3:05
10.	"What Is Life"	Harrison	3:21
11.	"If We Try"	McLean	3:23
12.	"Music Makes My Day"	Farrar	3:03
Total length:			37:21

== Charts ==
=== Weekly charts ===
Weekly chart performance for First Impressions
Chart (1974–76)	Peak position
Australian Albums (Kent Music Report)	3
Japanese Oricon LP Chart	25
New Zealand Albums (RMNZ)	2

=== Year-end charts ===
1974 year-end chart performance for First Impressions
Chart (1975)	Position
New Zealand Albums (RMNZ)	5

1975 year-end chart performance for First Impressions
Chart (1976)	Position
New Zealand Albums (RMNZ)	36

== Certifications ==
Region	Certification	Certified units/sales
Australia (ARIA)	5× Platinum	250,000^{^}
^{^} Shipments figures based on certification alone.
