= List of Top Country LP's number ones of 1974 =

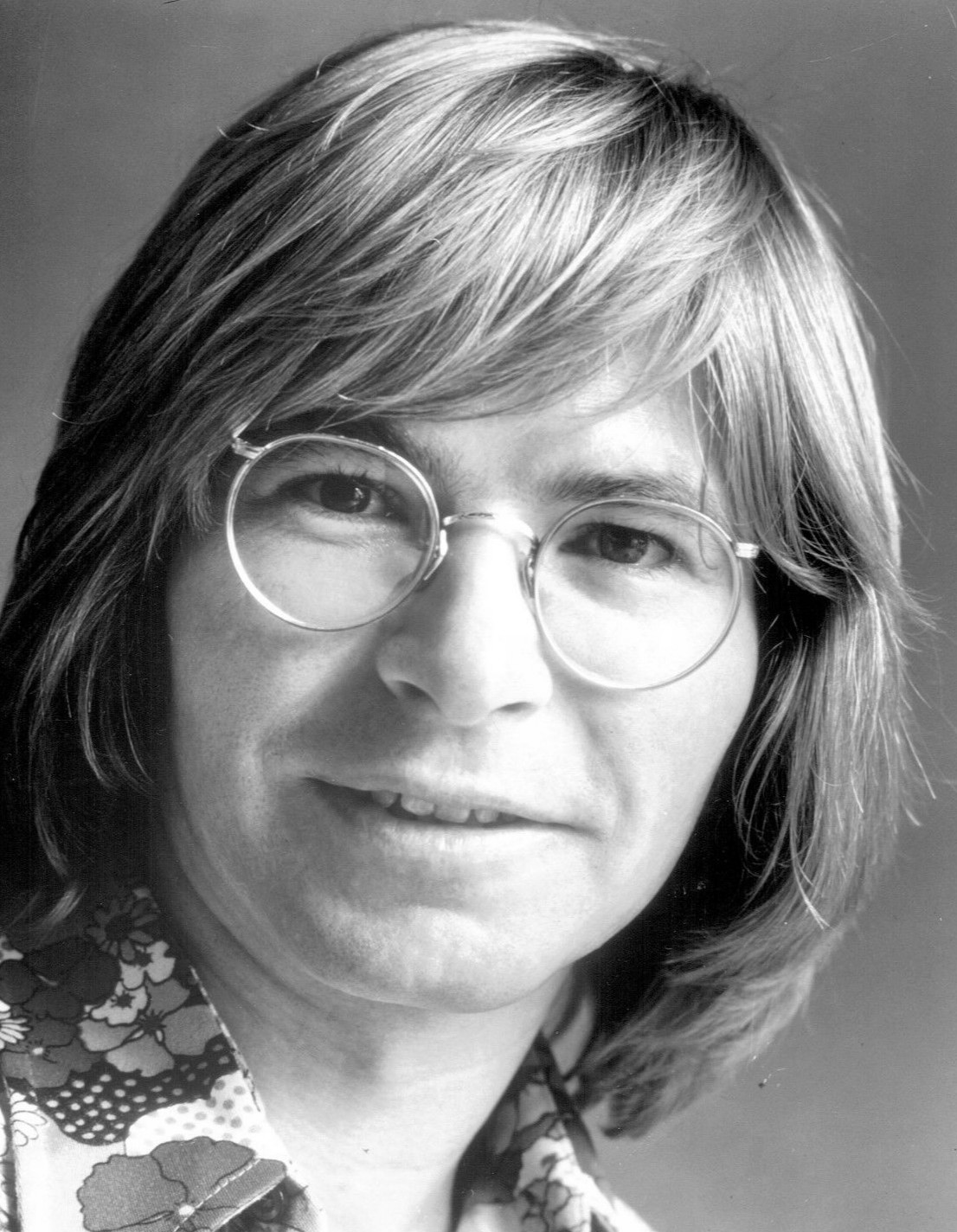
John Denver had four separate runs at number one in 1974 with his album Back Home Again.

Top Country Albums is a chart that ranks the top-performing country music albums in the United States, published by Billboard. In 1974, 12 different albums topped the chart, which was at the time published under the title Top Country LP's, based on sales reports submitted by a representative sample of stores nationwide.

In the issue of Billboard dated January 6, Charlie Rich was at number one with his album Behind Closed Doors. The album had spent four weeks at number one in June and July of the previous year. Five months after it left the top spot, it returned to number one in December, in the same week that Rich's song "The Most Beautiful Girl" reached number one on Billboard's all-genre singles chart, the Hot 100. The album would have several spells atop the chart in 1974 and eventually spend a total of 21 weeks at number one, a new record total for an album. Rich also spent time at number one with There Won't Be Anymore and Very Special Love Songs during the year, and in total spent 21 weeks atop the chart in 1974, the most by any artist. Problems in his personal life, however, would soon contribute to a decline in his career.

Two artists other than Rich achieved more than one number one in 1974. Conway Twitty topped the chart with Honky Tonk Angel and Country Partners, the latter a collaboration with Loretta Lynn. The two singers had a run of success with duet recordings in the early 1970s alongside their ongoing solo careers. Olivia Newton-John spent time in the top spot with both Let Me Be There and If You Love Me, Let Me Know, her first two charting albums. The success of the Anglo-Australian singer, who came from a pop music background, was controversial within the country music industry, and when she won the Female Vocalist of the Year award from the Country Music Association, some members of the organization resigned in protest. Her focus on the country genre would be brief, however; after 1979 she would not appear on the country albums chart again for nearly 20 years. The year's final number one album was Back Home Again by John Denver, a country-folk performer whose broad appeal made him the biggest-selling artist in America at the time. First reaching the top spot in August, the album would have four separate runs at number one during the remainder of the year, spending a total of 12 weeks atop the listing.

== Chart history ==
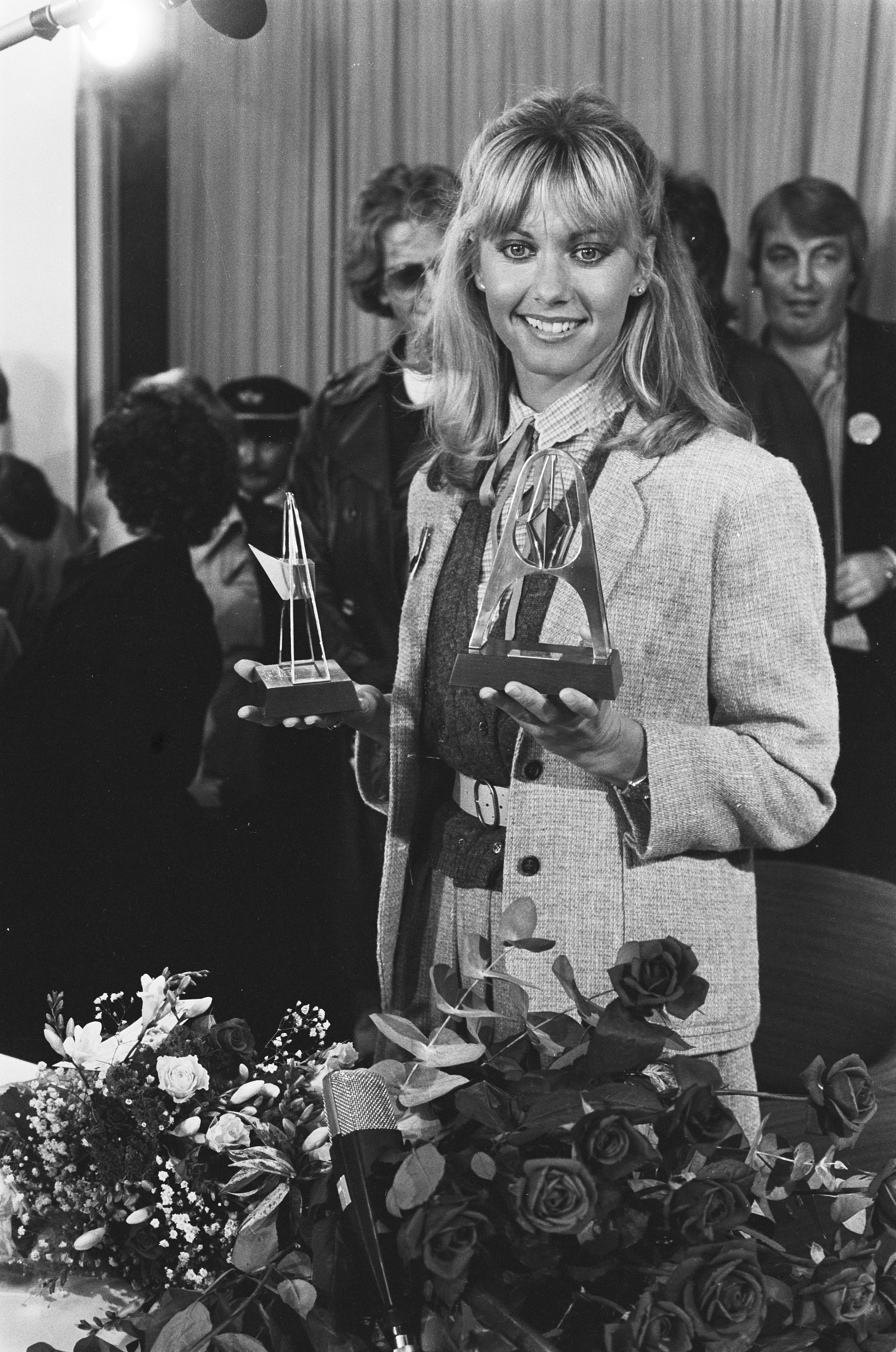
Olivia Newton-John had two number ones in 1974.

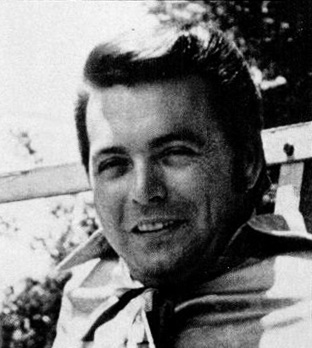
Room full of Roses was the first chart-topper for Mickey Gilley.

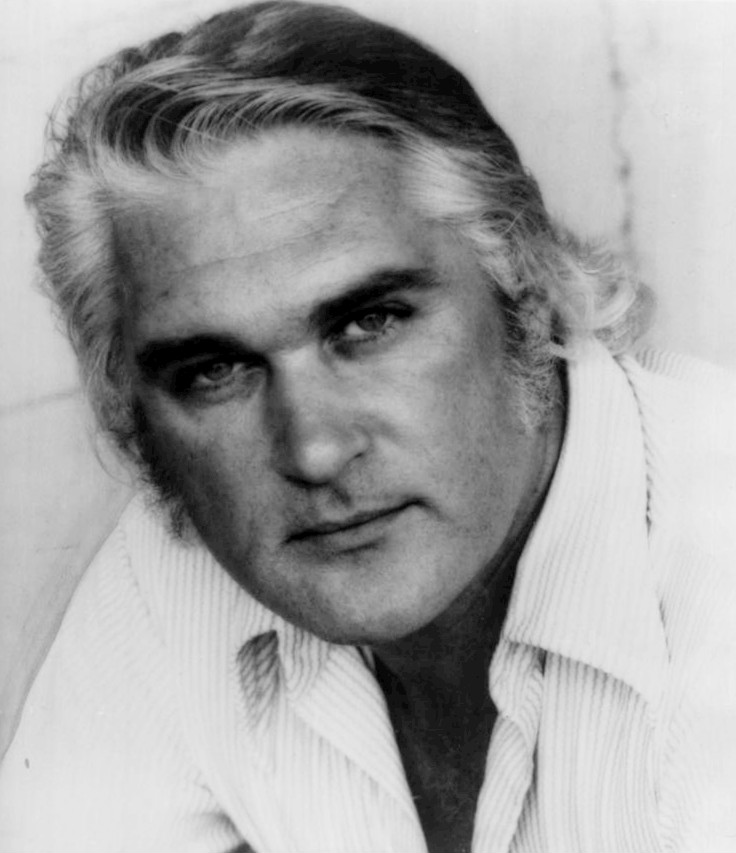
Behind Closed Doors by Charlie Rich spent its final week at number one in August 1974, more than a year after it had first reached the top spot.

Issue date	Title	Artist(s)	Ref.
January 5	Behind Closed Doors	Charlie Rich	
January 12	Behind Closed Doors	Charlie Rich	
January 19	Behind Closed Doors	Charlie Rich	
January 26	Behind Closed Doors	Charlie Rich	
February 2	Behind Closed Doors	Charlie Rich	
February 9	Behind Closed Doors	Charlie Rich	
February 16	Amazing Love	Charley Pride	
February 23	Amazing Love	Charley Pride	
March 2	Let Me Be There	Olivia Newton-John	
March 9	Let Me Be There	Olivia Newton-John	
March 16	Behind Closed Doors	Charlie Rich	
March 23	Behind Closed Doors	Charlie Rich	
March 30	Elvis: A Legendary Performer Volume 1	Elvis Presley	
April 6	Elvis: A Legendary Performer Volume 1	Elvis Presley	
April 13	There Won't Be Anymore	Charlie Rich	
April 20	There Won't Be Anymore	Charlie Rich	
April 27	Very Special Love Songs	Charlie Rich	
May 4	Very Special Love Songs	Charlie Rich	
May 11	Behind Closed Doors	Charlie Rich	
May 18	Behind Closed Doors	Charlie Rich	
May 25	Behind Closed Doors	Charlie Rich	
June 1	Honky Tonk Angel	Conway Twitty	
June 8	Very Special Love Songs	Charlie Rich	
June 15	Very Special Love Songs	Charlie Rich	
June 22	Behind Closed Doors	Charlie Rich	
June 29	Behind Closed Doors	Charlie Rich	
July 6	Very Special Love Songs	Charlie Rich	
July 13	If You Love Me, Let Me Know	Olivia Newton-John	
July 20	If You Love Me, Let Me Know	Olivia Newton-John	
July 27	If You Love Me, Let Me Know	Olivia Newton-John	
August 3	If You Love Me, Let Me Know	Olivia Newton-John	
August 10	If You Love Me, Let Me Know	Olivia Newton-John	
August 17	Behind Closed Doors	Charlie Rich	
August 24	Back Home Again	John Denver	
August 31	Back Home Again	John Denver	
September 7	Back Home Again	John Denver	
September 14	Back Home Again	John Denver	
September 21	Country Partners	Conway Twitty and Loretta Lynn	
September 28	If You Love Me, Let Me Know	Olivia Newton-John	
October 5	If You Love Me, Let Me Know	Olivia Newton-John	
October 12	If You Love Me, Let Me Know	Olivia Newton-John	
October 19	Back Home Again	John Denver	
October 26	Back Home Again	John Denver	
November 2	Back Home Again	John Denver	
November 9	Room Full of Roses	Mickey Gilley	
November 16	Back Home Again	John Denver	
November 23	Back Home Again	John Denver	
November 30	Merle Haggard Presents His 30th Album	Merle Haggard and the Strangers	
December 7	Merle Haggard Presents His 30th Album	Merle Haggard and the Strangers	
December 14	Back Home Again	John Denver	
December 21	Back Home Again	John Denver	
December 28	Back Home Again	John Denver	
