= What Is Life =

1970 song by George Harrison

- US picture sleeve

Single by George Harrison

from the album All Things Must Pass
- A-side: "My Sweet Lord" (UK)
- B-side: "Apple Scruffs" (except UK)
- Released: 15 February 1971 (US)
- Genre: Rock, soul
- Length: 4:18
- Label: Apple
- Songwriter: George Harrison
- Producers: George Harrison, Phil Spector

George Harrison singles chronology
"My Sweet Lord" / "Isn't It a Pity" (1970)	"What Is Life" (1971)	"Bangla Desh" (1971)

Music video
- "What Is Life" (Official Music Video) on YouTube

"What Is Life" is a song by the English rock musician George Harrison from his 1970 triple album All Things Must Pass. In many countries, it was issued as the second single from the album, in February 1971, becoming a top-ten hit in the United States, Canada and elsewhere, and topping singles charts in Australia and Switzerland. In the United Kingdom, "What Is Life" appeared as the B-side to "My Sweet Lord", which was the best-selling single there of 1971. Harrison's backing musicians on the song include Eric Clapton and the entire Delaney & Bonnie and Friends band, with whom he had toured during the final months of the Beatles. Harrison co-produced the recording with Phil Spector, whose Wall of Sound production also employed a prominent string arrangement by John Barham and multiple acoustic rhythm guitars, played by Harrison's fellow Apple Records signings Badfinger.

An uptempo soul tune, "What Is Life" is one of several Harrison love songs that appear to be directed at both a woman and a deity. Harrison wrote the song in 1969 and originally intended it as a track for his friend and Apple protégé Billy Preston to record. Built around a descending guitar riff, it is one of Harrison's most popular compositions and was a regular inclusion in his live performances. Rolling Stone magazine has variously described it as a "classic" and an "exultant song of surrender".

"What Is Life" has appeared in the soundtrack for feature films such as Goodfellas (1990), Patch Adams (1998), Big Daddy (1999), Away We Go (2009), This Is 40 (2012) and Instant Family (2018). Harrison's original recording was included on the compilations The Best of George Harrison and Let It Roll, and live versions appear on his album Live in Japan (1992) and in Martin Scorsese's 2011 documentary George Harrison: Living in the Material World. In 1972, Olivia Newton-John had a UK hit with her version of the song. Ronnie Aldrich, the Ventures and Shawn Mullins are among the other artists who have covered the track.

== Background ==
Even before his temporary departure from the Beatles in January 1969 (documented in the song "Wah-Wah"), their Apple Records label was an "emancipating force" for Harrison from the creative restrictions imposed on him within the band, according to his musical biographer, Simon Leng. In his article on All Things Must Pass for Mojo magazine, John Harris has written of Harrison's journey as a solo artist beginning in November 1968 – when he spent time in Woodstock with Bob Dylan and the Band – and incorporating a series of other collaborations through the following eighteen months, including various Apple projects and a support role on Delaney & Bonnie and Friends' brief European tour. One of these projects, carried out intermittently from April to July 1969, was his production of That's the Way God Planned It, an album by Billy Preston, whom Harrison had met during the Beatles' Hamburg years and had recently been recruited to guest on the band's troubled Get Back sessions. It was while driving up to a Preston session in London from his home in Esher, Surrey, that Harrison came up with the song "What Is Life".

In his autobiography, I, Me, Mine, Harrison describes it as having been written "very quickly" and recalls that he thought it would be a perfect, "catchy pop song" for Preston to record. He adds that he changed his mind once he arrived at Olympic Studios and found Preston working on more typical material – or "playing his funky stuff". Rather than attempt it with the Beatles during the band's concurrent Abbey Road sessions, Harrison stockpiled "What Is Life" with his many other unused songs from the period, including "All Things Must Pass", "Let It Down", "I'd Have You Anytime" and "Run of the Mill". He revisited it a year later, after completing work on Preston's second Apple album, Encouraging Words.

== Composition ==
Harrison biographer Simon Leng describes "What Is Life" as "Motown-spiced" and a comparatively rare example of its composer's willingness to embrace the role of "entertainer" in his songwriting. The song is defined by Harrison's descending guitar riff, which also serves as the motif for the chorus. Author Alan Clayson describes "What Is Life" as a seemingly "lovey-dovey pop song" that "craftily renewed the simplistic tonic-to-dominant riff cliché".

The lyrics have a universal quality, being both simple and uplifting. Their meaning has caused some debate among biographers and music critics, as to whether "What Is Life" should be viewed as a straightforward love song – perhaps a "lovingly crafted paean" to Harrison's wife Pattie Boyd, in Clayson's description – or a devotional song like many of Harrison's compositions. Ian Inglis writes that the song title suggests a "philosophical debate about the meaning of life", yet its rendering as "what is my life" in the choruses "reshapes [the meaning] completely".

Theologian Dale Allison finds no religious content in "What Is Life" but comments that the "failure of words to express feelings" implied in the opening line ("What I feel, I can't say") is a recurring theme in Harrison's spiritual songs. (Note: Allison locates this theme to "I Want to Tell You" from the Beatles era, and then in songs such as "That Is All", "Learning How to Love You", "Mystical One" and "Pisces Fish".) Joshua Greene, another religious academic, identifies the song as part of its parent album's "intimately detailed account of a spiritual journey": where "Awaiting on You All" shows Harrison "convinced of his union with God", "What Is Life" reveals him to be "uncertain that he deserved such divine favor". According to musicologist Thomas MacFarlane, the ambiguity in the lyrics suggests a connection between spiritual and physical love.

The second verse repeats what Inglis refers to as the "somewhat confusing promise" from Harrison (in lines 3 and 4) should his love be "rejected":

What I know, I can do
If I give my love out to everyone like you
But if it's not love that you need
Then I'll try my best to make everything succeed.

== Recording ==
By May 1970, having recently collaborated with "genuine R&B heavy-weights" such as Doris Troy and Preston, as well as participating in the "blue-eyed soul" Delaney & Bonnie European tour, along with Eric Clapton, the previous December, Harrison was well placed to record "What Is Life", Leng observes. With Phil Spector as co-producer and all the Friends team on hand, the song was among the first tracks taped for Harrison's debut post-Beatles solo album; recording took place at Abbey Road Studios in London, during late May or early June. The same core of musicians – Bobby Whitlock, Carl Radle, Jim Gordon, Bobby Keys and Jim Price – would similarly elevate other All Things Must Pass tracks such as "Awaiting on You All", "Art of Dying" and "Hear Me Lord". According to Keys, he and Price overdubbed their horns parts at a later session at Abbey Road. (Note: Keys adds that it was only when they started working on Harrison's album that he and Price realised they were not going to join the other Friends personnel in Clapton's new band, Derek and the Dominos.)

The track opens with Harrison playing the fuzztone guitar riff, which is then joined by Radle's bass and "churning" rhythm guitar from Clapton, before Gordon's drums bring the full band in. During the verses, Gordon moves to a square, Motown-style beat – or "rock-steady Northern soul backbeat" in Leng's words – before returning to the "galloping rhythm" of the more open, "knockout" choruses. The song is driven equally by Badfinger drummer Mike Gibbins' powerful tambourine work.

On "What Is Life", Spector provided what music critic David Fricke terms "echo-drenched theater", in the form of reverb-heavy brass, soaring strings (arranged by John Barham) and "a choir of multitracked Harrisons". Barham stayed at Harrison's new home, Friar Park in Henley-on-Thames, and created the scores for "What Is Life" and other songs from melodies that Harrison sang or played to him on piano or guitar. Barham says that, for inspiration, Harrison also played him Spector productions such as Checkmates, Ltd.'s "Proud Mary". (Note: Barham adds: "We were very impressed – I'd never heard a sound like that before, and that was the kind George wanted.") In his autobiography, Every Night's a Saturday Night, Keys recalls that Harrison and Price worked out the horn arrangement together at the overdubbing session. In MacFarlane's description, the strings provide a complementary countermelody to the guitar riff, while the horns' combination of "uptown soul and mariachi" heightens and expands the track's musical colour.

After recording the album's backing tracks with Spector, Harrison carried out most of the overdubbing without him, working at Trident Studios with former Beatles engineer Ken Scott. The song's vocals and strings, along with a brief slide-guitar commentary from Harrison over the final verse, were overdubbed at Trident. Dated 19 August, Spector's written comments on Harrison's early mix of the song had suggested a "proper background voice" was still needed. Harrison performed all the chorus vocals himself and credited them to "the George O'Hara-Smith Singers". Spector was impressed with Harrison's dedication in the studio, saying, "He was a great harmoniser ... he could do all the [vocal] parts himself" and rating Harrison "one of the most commercial musicians and songwriters and quintessential players I've ever known in my entire career".

== Release and reception ==
Tom Wilkes's original poster design for All Things Must Pass. Part of the top portion was instead used for the US picture sleeve for the "What Is Life" single.

"What Is Life" was released in late November 1970 as the first track on side two of All Things Must Pass, in its original, triple LP format. Along with "My Sweet Lord" and "Isn't It a Pity", the song had already been identified as a potential hit single by Allan Steckler, manager of Apple's US operation. Backed by "Apple Scruffs", "What Is Life" was issued as a single in America on 15 February 1971 (as Apple 1828), just as the "My Sweet Lord" / "Isn't It a Pity" double A-side was slipping out of the top ten. Billboard magazine's reviewer described "What Is Life" and "Apple Scruffs" as "intriguing rhythm follows-ups" to the first single, which were "sure to repeat that success" and "should prove big juke box items". Record World called it "perhaps the most commercial cut" from All Things Must Pass.

While describing the initial impact of All Things Must Pass, author Robert Rodriguez includes the song as an illustration of how the depth of Harrison's talents had been "hidden in plain sight" behind John Lennon and Paul McCartney during the Beatles' career. The album introduced Harrison as an overtly spiritual songwriter who sought to connect with his audience on a "higher level" compared with the populist approach of McCartney or the confrontationalism adopted by Lennon. Rodriguez concludes: "That the Quiet Beatle was capable of such range – from the joyful 'What Is Life' to the meditative 'Isn't It a Pity' to the steamrolling 'Art of Dying' to the playful 'I Dig Love' – was truly revelatory."

The front of the single's US picture sleeve consisted of a photo of Harrison playing guitar inside the central tower of Friar Park. The tower's sole, octagonal-shaped room was an area that Harrison had adopted as his personal temple and meditation space. This picture was taken by photographer Barry Feinstein, whose Camouflage Productions partner, Tom Wilkes, originally used it as part of an elaborate poster intended as an insert in the album package. The poster featured a painting of the Hindu deity Krishna watching a group of naked maidens beside a bathing pond. Harrison apparently felt uncomfortable with the symbolism in Wilkes's design – the Friar Park tower image filled the top half of the poster, floating among clouds above the Krishna scene – so Wilkes abandoned the concept and instead used a darkened photo of Harrison inside the house as the album poster. (Note: According to music historian and memorabilia collector Jeff Gold, the painting remained virtually unknown until the 2005 publication of Spizer's book on Apple Records, and Wilkes's creation of limited-edition prints to raise funds for the World Peace organisation.) In Denmark, the picture sleeve consisted of four shots of Harrison, again with guitar, taken on stage during the Delaney & Bonnie tour.

As with the parent album, the single was a commercial and critical success. "What Is Life" peaked at number 10 on the Billboard Hot 100 and number 7 on Cash Box's Top 100 chart, making Harrison the first ex-Beatle to have two top-ten hits in the United States. The single climbed to number 1 in Switzerland and on Australia's Go-Set National Top 60, and reached the top three elsewhere in Europe and in Canada. In Britain, where Harrison had resisted issuing a single from All Things Must Pass until midway through January, "What Is Life" appeared as the B-side of "My Sweet Lord". The record became the top-selling single of 1971 in that country.

== Retrospective assessments and legacy ==
"What Is Life" is one of Harrison's most commercial and popular songs – a "spiritual guitar quest" that "became [a] classic", according to Rolling Stone magazine. In their Solo Beatles Compendium, authors Chip Madinger and Mark Easter refer to it as an "intensely catchy track" and view its pairing with "My Sweet Lord" in the UK as perhaps the strongest of all of Harrison's singles. Writing in 1981, NME critic Bob Woffinden grouped "What Is Life" with "My Sweet Lord", "Isn't It a Pity" and "Awaiting on You All" as "all excellent songs".

Reviewing the 2001 reissue of All Things Must Pass, for Rolling Stone, James Hunter wrote of how the album's music "exults in breezy rhythms", among which "the colorful revolutions of 'What Is Life' ... [move] like a Ferris wheel". The following year, in Rolling Stone Press's Harrison tribute book, David Fricke included "What Is Life" among his selection of "essential Harrison performances" (just three of which date from the ex-Beatle's solo years) and described the track as an "exultant song of surrender", abetted by Harrison's "pumping fuzz guitar" and the song's "singalong magnetism". AllMusic's Richie Unterberger similarly praises "What Is Life" for its "anthemic" qualities, "particularly snazzy horn lines", and a guitar riff that is "one more entry in the catalog of George Harrison's book of arresting, low, descending guitar lines".

Writing in the book 1,000 Recordings to Hear Before You Die, author Tom Moon refers to "the upbeat single 'What Is Life'" as an example of how Harrison "grabs what he needs from his old band – that insinuating hook sense – and uses it to frame an utterly comfortable metaphysical discourse". Simon Leng credits Harrison's "innate ability to write very fine pop-rock songs" and deems the result "as innovative an exercise in rock-soul as the Temptations' 'Cloud Nine'". Ian Inglis is less enthusiastic, acknowledging that Barham's orchestration and the other musicians give the track "undoubted excitement and energy", but lamenting that the song offers "little overall coherence between words and music". In Thomas MacFarlane's view, "What Is Life" is a "remarkable pop song" that "takes the tone and attitude of Phil Spector's Wall of Sound and channels it through the prism of the late-period Beatles".

Writing for Q magazine in 2002, John Harris said the "widescreen sound" of All Things Must Pass tracks such as "What Is Life" was a forerunner to recordings by ELO and Oasis. PopMatters' Jason Korenkiewicz describes the song as a "jangle pop masterpiece and blueprint for the Britpop movement", adding that "Harrison's musical legacy has contributed greatly to the exuberance of Britpop in the '90s." The track is said to be a favourite of Foo Fighters singer Dave Grohl, who titled his 1995 song "Oh, George" in tribute to Harrison. Guitarist Steve Lukather also named it as a favourite, adding of All Things Must Pass: "there is a LOT of deep soul music in those grooves."

Michael Galluci of Ultimate Classic Rock placed "What Is Life" second (behind "My Sweet Lord") in his list titled "Top 10 George Harrison Songs". Galluci wrote of the track having "a giant pop hook as its guide" as well as "the catchiest chorus Harrison ever penned". In 2009, Matt Melis of Consequence of Sound listed it sixth among his "Top Ten Songs by Ex-Beatles", writing: "it's arguable that Harrison's All Things Must Pass is the best solo album put out by a Beatle. 'What is Life' … with its riff-driven bounce, soaring harmonies on the choruses, and perfectly placed sax and trumpet, [is] probably Harrison's catchiest pop song." In the 2005 publication NME Originals: Beatles – The Solo Years 1970–1980, Adrian Thrills rated it first among Harrison's "ten solo gems", adding: "One of Harrison's greatest guitar riffs – brilliant pop." "What Is Life" topped a similar list in Paste magazine, where Madison Desler writes: "Another ambiguous love song that could be directed at a woman or a higher power, 'What Is Life' explodes jubilantly, a rare moment of pure celebration for Harrison." She also describes the track as "an onion of pop gold that reveals different parts of itself the more you listen to it" and "a staple of pop culture" due to the song's popularity in film soundtracks.

In a 2010 poll to find the "10 Best George Harrison Songs", AOL Radio listeners voted "What Is Life" third, behind "My Sweet Lord" and "Blow Away". In a Rolling Stone readers' poll, titled "10 Greatest Solo Beatle Songs", the song placed fourth, with the editor commenting: "The track is deceptively simple, and more layers become apparent the more often you play it." "What Is Life" has featured in Bruce Pollock's book The 7,500 Most Important Songs of 1944–2000,Treble website's "The Top 200 Songs of the 1970s" (ranked at number 101) and Dave Thompson's 1000 Songs That Rock Your World (at number 247).

== Subsequent releases and appearances in films ==
"What Is Life" was included on the 1976 compilation The Best of George Harrison, as the closing track, and 2009's Let It Roll: Songs by George Harrison. The song has also appeared in several popular feature films: Martin Scorsese's Goodfellas (1990), during the "May 11, 1980" sequence; Tom Shadyac's Patch Adams (1998); Sam Mendes' Away We Go (2009); Judd Apatow's This Is 40 (2012), for which it was also used in advance promotion; and Instant Family (2018), directed by Sean Anders. According to Andy Greene of Rolling Stone: "Today, many people know it merely as a song from all those soundtracks ... It's almost as ubiquitous as 'Let My Love Open the Door' or 'Solsbury Hill'."

A portion of "What Is Life" plays in Scorsese's 2011 documentary George Harrison: Living in the Material World, between "Here Comes the Sun" and the Radha Krishna Temple's "Hare Krishna Mantra". It accompanies a sequence of 1969 photos of Harrison with, variously, Preston, Jackie Lomax, the Plastic Ono Band, Clapton and Ravi Shankar, and follows archive footage showing him discussing the restrictions he felt within the Beatles and how the band "had to implode". In his film review for Entertainment Weekly, Owen Gleiberman recalled of the song:

I will never forget the tingle I felt while standing, when I was around 11, at a jukebox in a diner in early-'70s Ann Arbor, dropping a coin into the machine to play a song that was still new to me: "What Is Life". That descending guitar line crackled out of the speaker like a sassy, jagged lightning bolt. The drums were as thunderous as Led Zeppelin's, only it was romantic thunder, and Harrison's yearning vocals rode atop Phil Spector's now-electrified wall of sound like a jubilant cry of triumph: He had broken free! Free of the Beatles, of the '60s, of the material world ... It was one of the most ecstatic things I'd ever heard, and ever would hear. It was the spirit of love speaking through George Harrison, as it would speak through him throughout that album.

An alternative studio version of "What Is Life" was one of the five bonus tracks included on the 2001 remaster of All Things Must Pass. This version is a rough mix of the original backing track with different orchestration – in this case, piccolo trumpet and oboe. In the accompanying booklet, Harrison writes that this orchestral arrangement was discarded because he "didn't like the feel". Speaking to Billboard editor-in-chief Timothy White in December 2000, Harrison explained the reason for the lack of a guide vocal on this version: "I'm playing the fuzz guitar part that goes all through the song. So all I could do on the [initial] take was to give the band the cue line – the first line of each verse – and then go back to playing that riff. So that rough mix without the vocal – I'd forgot all about it …" (Note: This instrumental version also appeared as a bonus track on the 2014 Apple Years 1968–75 reissue of All Things Must Pass.)

=== Music video ===
Coinciding with the release of the Apple Years 1968–75 box set in September 2014, Harrison's widow and son, Olivia and Dhani Harrison, held an online competition in which filmmakers were invited to create a video clip for "What Is Life". The winner would receive a $5000 cash prize and have their entry become the official video for the track, appearing on the George Harrison YouTube channel and other media platforms. In November, Olivia and Dhani selected Brandon Moore of Oakland, California, as the winner. Moore's video comprises dance interpretations by Emma Rubinowitz and Esteban Hernandez of the San Francisco Ballet, filmed in the streets and woods of the San Francisco Presidio.

== Live performance ==
A live version of the song, recorded with Eric Clapton and his band in December 1991, is available on Harrison's 1992 album Live in Japan album. The performance was recorded at Tokyo Dome on 17 December, during the final show of the tour.

Part of a concert performance of "What Is Life" from Harrison's 1974 North American tour with Ravi Shankar appears in Scorsese's George Harrison: Living in the Material World. This was the first US tour by a former Beatle but the concerts were highly controversial and proved damaging to Harrison's artistic standing. (Note: Harrison was widely criticised for his laryngitis-ravaged vocals, his spiritual pronouncements and on-stage demeanour, and his choosing to afford considerable stage-time to Shankar's Indian classical ensemble.) Rock publications such as Rolling Stone ensured that the tour gained a reputation as a disastrous venture, although bootleg recordings from the shows partly refute this. Simon Leng writes of a Fort Worth performance of "What Is Life" that was "greeted with a reception that matched anything the New York audience at the [August 1971] Bangla Desh concerts expressed".

== Cover versions ==
"What Is Life"
- Picture sleeve for the West German release

Single by Olivia Newton-John

from the album Olivia
- B-side: "I'm a Small and Lonely Light"
- Released: 1972
- Length: 3:21
- Label: Pye International (UK); Uni (US)
- Songwriter: George Harrison
- Producers: Bruce Welch, John Farrar

Olivia Newton-John singles chronology
"Banks of the Ohio" (1971)	"What Is Life" (1972)	"Just a Little Too Much" (1972)

=== Olivia Newton-John ===
British-Australian pop singer Olivia Newton-John included "What Is Life", along with a version of Harrison's All Things Must Pass track "Behind That Locked Door", on her 1972 album Olivia. The song was arranged and produced by Bruce Welch of the Shadows and John Farrar, who was Newton-John's regular producer and collaborator during the 1970s.

Billboard called it a "fine reading by that "If Not For You" gal with much play and sales potential."

Released as a single in some countries, this version reached the UK top 20 in March 1972, peaking at number 16. (Note: Her debut single, a US hit in late 1971, was a cover of the Dylan song "If Not for You", based on the Harrison arrangement from All Things Must Pass rather than Dylan's own reading.) The song's chart run coincided with Newton-John touring the UK with French balladeer Sacha Distel before beginning a season of solo concerts at London's Prince of Wales Theatre. "What Is Life" subsequently appeared on her compilation albums Back to Basics: The Essential Collection 1971–1992 (1992) and The Definitive Collection (2002).

=== Charts ===
Chart (1972)	Peak position
UK Singles (Official Charts)	16
US Adult Contemporary (Billboard)	34
Ireland (IRMA)	18

=== Other artists ===
"What Is Life" was one of the songs that middle-of-the-road artists rushed to record as a result of All Things Must Pass' popularity. In 1971, British easy listening pianist Ronnie Aldrich covered it (as well as "My Sweet Lord") on his album Love Story, giving the track what AllMusic reviewer Al Campbell views as a regrettable "Muzak arrangement". That same year, the Ventures included an instrumental version on their New Testament album, recorded when the band had progressed from their surf rock roots to embrace fuzz-tone and other heavier guitar sounds. Music critic Bruce Eder cites the track as an example of the album's "loud, jagged guitar" music and of Ventures guitarist Gerry McGee "crossing swords musically" with contemporaries such as Harrison, Clapton and Jimmy Page through the band's choice of covers.

Shawn Mullins recorded "What Is Life" for the soundtrack of the 1999 film Big Daddy. Released as a single, it peaked at number 62 on the UK Singles Chart. In 2004, Christian rock singer Neal Morse included a recording on the special-edition version of his album One, with Phil Keaggy as a guest vocalist. The track later appeared on Morse's 2006 album with Mike Portnoy and Randy George (as Morse/Portnoy/George), Cover to Cover, which also includes covers of "Day After Day", which Harrison produced for Badfinger in 1971, and the Clapton–Harrison composition "Badge". (Note: Morse's former band, Spock's Beard, used Harrison's "Beware of Darkness", also from All Things Must Pass, as the title track of their 1996 debut album Beware of Darkness.)

"What Is Life" was performed by "Weird Al" Yankovic at the George Fest tribute concert in Los Angeles on 28 September 2014. The recording was included on the George Fest live album and concert DVD package in 2016.

== Personnel ==
The following musicians are believed to have played on "What Is Life":

- George Harrison – vocals, lead guitar, acoustic guitar, slide guitar, backing vocals
- Eric Clapton – guitar
- Bobby Whitlock – organ
- Carl Radle – bass
- Jim Gordon – drums
- Jim Price – trumpet, horn arrangement
- Bobby Keys – saxophone
- Pete Ham – acoustic guitar
- Tom Evans – acoustic guitar
- Joey Molland – acoustic guitar
- Mike Gibbins – tambourine
- John Barham – string arrangement

== Chart performance ==
=== George Harrison version ===
Weekly charts

Chart (1971)	Peak position
Australian Go-Set National Top 60	1
Austrian Singles Chart	5
Belgian Ultratop Singles	5
Canadian RPM 100 Singles	3
Dutch MegaChart Singles	2
Italian Discografia Internazionale Chart	9
Japanese Oricon Singles Chart	19
New Zealand Listener Chart	2
Norwegian VG-lista Singles	7
South African Springbok Singles Chart	4
Swiss Singles Chart	1
US Billboard Hot 100	10
US Billboard Easy Listening	31
US Cash Box Top 100	7
US Record World Singles Chart	10
West German Media Control Singles	3

Year-end charts

Chart (1971)	Position
Canadian RPM Singles Chart	41
Dutch Singles Chart	45
US Cash Box	48

=== Olivia Newton-John version ===
Chart (1972)	Peak position
Irish Singles Chart	18
UK Singles Chart	16
US Billboard Easy Listening	34

== Certifications ==
Region	Certification	Certified units/sales
New Zealand (RMNZ)	Gold	15,000^{‡}
^{‡} Sales+streaming figures based on certification alone.

== Sources ==
- Dale C. Allison Jr., The Love There That's Sleeping: The Art and Spirituality of George Harrison, Continuum (New York, NY, 2006; ISBN 978-0-8264-1917-0).
- Keith Badman, The Beatles Diary Volume 2: After the Break-Up 1970–2001, Omnibus Press (London, 2001; ISBN 0-7119-8307-0).
- Harry Castleman & Walter J. Podrazik, All Together Now: The First Complete Beatles Discography 1961–1975, Ballantine Books (New York, NY, 1976; ISBN 0-345-25680-8).
- Alan Clayson, George Harrison, Sanctuary (London, 2003; ISBN 1-86074-489-3).
- The Editors of Rolling Stone, Harrison, Rolling Stone Press/Simon & Schuster (New York, NY, 2002; ISBN 0-7432-3581-9).
- Peter Doggett, "George Harrison: The Apple Years 1968–1975", Record Collector, April 2001, pp. 34–40.
- Michael Frontani, "The Solo Years", in Kenneth Womack (ed.), The Cambridge Companion to the Beatles, Cambridge University Press (Cambridge, UK, 2009; ISBN 978-1-139-82806-2), pp. 153–82.
- George Harrison: Living in the Material World DVD, Village Roadshow, 2011 (directed by Martin Scorsese; produced by Olivia Harrison, Nigel Sinclair & Martin Scorsese).
- Joshua M. Greene, Here Comes the Sun: The Spiritual and Musical Journey of George Harrison, John Wiley & Sons (Hoboken, NJ, 2006; ISBN 978-0-470-12780-3).
- George Harrison, I Me Mine, Chronicle Books (San Francisco, CA, 2002; ISBN 0-8118-3793-9).
- Olivia Harrison, George Harrison: Living in the Material World, Abrams (New York, NY, 2011; ISBN 978-1-4197-0220-4).
- Elliot J. Huntley, Mystical One: George Harrison – After the Break-up of the Beatles, Guernica Editions (Toronto, ON, 2006; ISBN 1-55071-197-0).
- Chris Ingham, The Rough Guide to the Beatles, Rough Guides/Penguin (London, 2006; 2nd edn; ISBN 978-1-84836-525-4).
- Ian Inglis, The Words and Music of George Harrison, Praeger (Santa Barbara, CA, 2010; ISBN 978-0-313-37532-3).
- Bobby Keys with Bill Ditenhafer, Every Night's a Saturday Night: The Rock 'n' Roll Life of Legendary Sax Man Bobby Keys, Counterpoint (Berkeley, CA, 2012; ISBN 978-1-58243-783-5).
- Simon Leng, While My Guitar Gently Weeps: The Music of George Harrison, Hal Leonard (Milwaukee, WI, 2006; ISBN 1-4234-0609-5).
- Thomas MacFarlane, The Music of George Harrison, Routledge (Abingdon, UK, 2019; ISBN 978-1-138-59910-9).
- Chip Madinger & Mark Easter, Eight Arms to Hold You: The Solo Beatles Compendium, 44.1 Productions (Chesterfield, MO, 2000; ISBN 0-615-11724-4).
- Tom Moon, 1,000 Recordings to Hear Before You Die, Workman Publishing (New York, NY, 2008; ISBN 978-0-7611-5385-6).
- Robert Rodriguez, Fab Four FAQ 2.0: The Beatles' Solo Years, 1970–1980, Backbeat Books (Milwaukee, WI, 2010; ISBN 978-1-4165-9093-4).
- Patricia Romanowski & Holly George-Warren (eds), The New Rolling Stone Encyclopedia of Rock & Roll, Fireside/Rolling Stone Press (New York, NY, 1995; ISBN 0-684-81044-1).
- Nicholas Schaffner, The Beatles Forever, McGraw-Hill (New York, NY, 1978; ISBN 0-07-055087-5).
- Bruce Spizer, The Beatles Solo on Apple Records, 498 Productions (New Orleans, LA, 2005; ISBN 0-9662649-5-9).
- Gary Tillery, Working Class Mystic: A Spiritual Biography of George Harrison, Quest Books (Wheaton, IL, 2011; ISBN 978-0-8356-0900-5).
- Bobby Whitlock with Marc Roberty, Bobby Whitlock: A Rock 'n' Roll Autobiography, McFarland (Jefferson, NC, 2010; ISBN 978-0-7864-6190-5).
- Bob Woffinden, The Beatles Apart, Proteus (London, 1981; ISBN 0-906071-89-5).
- Kenneth Womack, The Beatles Encyclopedia: Everything Fab Four, ABC-CLIO (Santa Barbara, CA, 2014; ISBN 978-0-313-39171-2).
