= Making a Good Thing Better =

Studio album by Olivia Newton-John
- Released: June 1977
- Recorded: 1977
- Studios: Sunset Sound, Sound Labs, Hollywood Sound Recorders and United Western Recorders (Hollywood, CA); A&R Recording (New York, NY); Little Mountain Sound Studios (Vancouver)
- Genres: Country; country pop
- Length: 42:22
- Label: MCA
- Producer: John Farrar

Olivia Newton-John chronology
Don't Stop Believin' (1976)	Making a Good Thing Better (1977)	Olivia Newton-John's Greatest Hits (1977)

Singles from Making a Good Thing Better
- 1. "Making a Good Thing Better" Released: June 1977; 2. "Don't Cry for Me Argentina" Released: 1977

Making a Good Thing Better is the tenth studio album by British-Australian singer Olivia Newton-John, released in June 1977.

The album peaked at No. 34 on the US Pop chart and No. 13 on the Country chart. It was Newton-John's first album not to reach the country top 10. The album also ended Olivia's streak of six consecutive gold albums from 1973's Let Me Be There through 1976's Don't Stop Believin'. This album received mixed and negative reviews from music critics at the time of its release.

== Background ==
Newton-John was in a dispute with MCA Records at the time of the recording and was in negotiations to be released from MCA, thus the label did not promote the album. At the time, Newton-John sued for her release from MCA, claiming they had not promoted her music, resulting in diminished chart placement. She attempted to promote the album and single, appearing on the cover of Us Weekly on 23 August 1977 and making a promotional clip of the song that aired on NBC's The Midnight Special.

Olivia Newton-John went on to sign on to do the movie Grease, and came to an agreement to stay with MCA Records, though her recordings from the movie were on RSO Records.

== Singles ==
The title track was the album lead single, peaking at number 87 on the US Pop chart and No. 20 on the Adult Contemporary chart. It was Newton-John's first single not to reach the AC Top 10 since 1972's "What Is Life".

"Don't Cry for Me Argentina" was released as the album's second single in selected territories, peaking in Australia at number 32 in 1980.

== Reception ==
Professional ratings
Review scores
Source	Rating
AllMusic	2/5 stars

In their review, Billboard called the album "another stellar rendering from the pretty maiden of mellow pop. Familiar John themes about sad or lost love - amid tranquil ballads, mid-tempo numbers and perky, up beat, country-flavored offerings. Particularly exhilarating is a stirring interpretation of "Don't Cry For Me Argentina" from Webber /Rice's "Evita" rock opera. The evocative vocal and stirring orchestration indicates a bolder rock direction and range for this artist. As usual John Farrar's production is outstanding and there are potential pop and country singles."

Cashbox stated "once again, in Olivia's seventh album offering, the lovely and engaging songstress demonstrates her musical versatility in a variety of styles - a talent that has made her a queen of crossover. Besides a tasty pop sampling of tunes, tempered with some gentle country selections, her interpretation of "Don't Cry For Me, Argentina" is particularly impressive and majestic. Should be an instant add to a variety of playlists."

Allmusic were more critical in their assessment of the album, noting "Newton-John has actually made a good thing blander on her 1977 release, in which she milks her tender innocence and soft vocals until all that is left is a drought-driven yearning for substance....Newton-John, whose voice is overtly feminine, works best with songs that are raw and untamed. It does not mean she should keep away from ballads, but on this selection of monotonously low-key ballads, she would at least benefit from less whimpering."

== Track listing ==
Side one
No.	Title	Writer(s)	Length
1.	"Making a Good Thing Better"	Pete Wingfield	3:47
2.	"Slow Dancing"	Jack Tempchin	4:00
3.	"Ring of Fire"	June Carter; Merle Kilgore	3:18
4.	"Coolin' Down"	John Farrar	3:58
5.	"Don't Cry for Me Argentina"	Tim Rice; Andrew Lloyd Webber	6:03

Side two
No.	Title	Writer(s)	Length
6.	"Sad Songs"	Billy Alessi; Bobby Alessi	3:39
7.	"You Won't See Me Cry"	John Falsia; Stephen Sinclair	3:03
8.	"So Easy to Begin"	Jules Shear	3:33
9.	"I Think I'll Say Goodbye"	Marshall Chapman; Jim Rushing	2:41
10.	"Don't Ask a Friend"	Olivia Newton-John	3:46
11.	"If Love Is Real"	Randy Edelman	4:34
Total length:			42:22

Japan 2010 SHM-CD bonus tracks
No.	Title	Length
12.	"Nevertheless / As Time Goes By" (Live in Osaka, Japan, December 1976)	4:28
13.	"Rest Your Love on Me" (duet with Andy Gibb from his 1980 album After Dark)	4:57
Total length:		51:47

== Personnel ==
=== Musicians ===
- Olivia Newton-John – lead vocals, backing vocals (2, 6, 7)
- Greg Mathieson – acoustic piano (1, 2, 6, 9, 11), clavinet (3, 7), Fender Rhodes (4, 8), synthesizers (6), harpsichord (11)
- Randy Edelman – harmonium (11)
- John Farrar – electric guitar (1, 9–11), slide guitar, acoustic guitar (2, 7–9), backing vocals (9, 11)
- Jay Graydon – electric guitar (1, 4, 6, 10), acoustic guitar (2, 7–9), slide guitar (11)
- Sneaky Pete Kleinow – steel guitar (2, 8)
- El Boogre – steel guitar (9)
- Leland Sklar – bass guitar (1–4, 6–11)
- Jeff Porcaro – drums (1–4, 6–11), percussion (1, 3, 4, 7, 11)
- Joe Porcaro – percussion (1, 7)
- Tommy Morgan – harmonica (3)
- Byron Berline – fiddle (3), mandolin (9)
- George Marge – oboe (7), ocarina (7)
- James Newton Howard – string arrangements and conductor (1, 2, 4, 10), acoustic piano (10), harpsichord (10)
- Peter Meyers – orchestra arrangements and conductor (5)
- David Campbell – string arrangements and conductor (8)
- Laura Creamer – backing vocals (1, 3)
- Myrna Matthews – backing vocals (1, 3, 6)
- Julie Rinker – backing vocals (1, 3)
- Pattie Brooks – backing vocals (6)
- Marti McCall – backing vocals (6)

=== Production ===
- Producer – John Farrar
- Engineers – Tom Bush, Bill Schnee, Armin Steiner and Linda Tyler.
- Remixing – Bill Schnee and Elliot Scheiner
- Recorded at Sunset Sound, Sound Labs, Hollywood Sound Recorders and Western Recorders (Hollywood, CA); A & R Recording (New York, NY); Little Mountain Sound Studios (Vancouver, B.C.).
- Art direction and design – George Osaki
- Photography – Bob Stone
- Costume design/wardrobe/stylist – Fleur Thiemeyer

== Charts ==
Chart performance for Making a Good Thing Better
Chart (1977)	Peak position
Australian Albums (Kent Music Report)	71
UK Albums (Official Charts)	60
US Billboard 200	34
US Top Country Albums (Billboard)	13
US Cash Box Top Albums	33
US Cash Box Country Albums	6
Canada Top Albums/CDs (RPM)	33
Japanese Oricon LP Chart	3

=== Certifications and sales ===
Region	Certification	Certified units/sales
Canada (Music Canada)	Gold	50,000^{^}
^{^} Shipments figures based on certification alone.
