= If You Love Me (Let Me Know) =

Single by Olivia Newton-John

from the album If You Love Me, Let Me Know
- B-side: "Rosewater" (Australia); "Brotherly Love" (US, Canada and rest of world)
- Released: April 1974
- Recorded: 1974
- Genre: Country, pop
- Length: 3:12
- Label: MCA
- Songwriter: John Rostill
- Producer: John Farrar

Olivia Newton-John singles chronology
"Long Live Love" (1974)	"If You Love Me (Let Me Know)" (1974)	"I Honestly Love You" (1974)

"If You Love Me (Let Me Know)" is a song written by John Rostill that was a 1974 hit single for Olivia Newton-John. It was her second release to hit the top 10 in the United States, reaching number 5 on the pop chart and number 2 on the Easy Listening chart. It also reached number 2 on the Billboard country chart. As with her single "Let Me Be There", Mike Sammes sings a bass harmony. It was nominated for the 1974 Country Music Association Award for Single of the Year.

Record World said that "Another John Rostill tune produced in the style of 'Let Me Be There' should guarantee a similar kind of success saga for her follow-up."

Newton-John performed the song along with Andy Gibb and ABBA on the 1978 ABC-TV special Olivia!.

== Chart performance ==
=== Weekly charts ===
Chart (1974)	Peak position
Australia (Kent Music Report)	2
Canada Country Singles (RPM)	1
Canada Top Singles (RPM)	4
Canada Adult Contemporary (RPM)	1
Israel (Israeli Singles Chart)	19
West Germany (GfK)	37
South Africa (Springbok)	1
US Billboard Hot 100	5
US Adult Contemporary (Billboard)	2
US Hot Country Songs (Billboard)	2
US Cashbox Top 100	6
US Cashbox Country Top 75	1
Quebec (ADISQ)	4

=== Year-end charts ===
Chart (1974)	Position
Australia (Kent Music Report)	40
Canada Top Singles (RPM)	60
South Africa (Springbok)	7
US Billboard Hot 100	32
US Hot Country Songs (Billboard)	9
US Cashbox Top 100	31
US Cashbox Country Top 75	31

== Cover versions ==
- Elvis Presley covered the song in concert, a recording of this appears on his 1977 live album Elvis in Concert and on his final studio album Moody Blue. It was the final recording of his life to appear on any release.
- Tina Turner recorded a version for her debut solo album Tina Turns the Country On! in 1974.
- Brian Collins covered the song for Dot Records in 1977. His version went to number 83 on the country chart.
