= Olivia (Olivia Newton-John album) =

Studio album by Olivia Newton-John
- Released: 11 August 1972
- Recorded: 1972
- Studios: Abbey Road, Studio 2, London
- Genres: Country; country pop
- Length: 40:38
- Label: Festival
- Producers: Bruce Welch, John Farrar

Olivia Newton-John chronology
If Not for You (1971)	Olivia (1972)	Let Me Be There (1973)

Singles from Olivia
- 1. "What Is Life" Released: March 1972; 2. "Just a Little Too Much" Released: 1972

Olivia (released in continental Europe as Olivia Newton-John) is the second studio album by the British-Australian singer-songwriter Olivia Newton-John, released in 1972. Two of its songs were released as singles ("What Is Life" and "Just a Little Too Much"). It was never issued in the United States, where just four of its songs would instead eventually be released on Let Me Be There and If You Love Me, Let Me Know. Festival Records in Australia re-released Olivia in combination with Newton-John's first solo album, If Not for You, as a two-record set in 1973 on the Interfusion label, simply titled Olivia Newton-John, with a cover photo taken in 1972. Olivia was not released on CD until 1990, when EMI in Japan issued it on their Pastmasters series. It was finally released in a digitally remastered version by Festival Records in Australia in 1998. Fans in the United States had to obtain one of these CD versions as an import, as the album has never been released there.

Newton-John covers two songs from George Harrison on this album, "Behind That Locked Door" and "What Is Life", both from Harrison's first solo album, All Things Must Pass, published in 1970. Other noteworthy songs on the album include her rendition of Chip Taylor's "Angel of the Morning", David Gates's "Everything I Own" and Newton-John's own "Changes". The last found its way into Newton-John's live performances and remained there at least through the late 1970s. It was featured during her November 1978 Live in Amsterdam concert which was broadcast in the Netherlands. She also performed it live on the Merv Griffin show that year. And it was included on Newton-John's first greatest hits collection in the United States at the end of 1977.

The cover art, done in blue tint, was later used (in a blueish-green tint) as the cover of the US release of Let Me Be There on MCA Records in 1973, following the success of the hit single penned by John Rostill.

== Reception ==
The first single "What Is Life" reached number 18 in Ireland and number 16 in the UK, but the album itself was a commercial failure when released in the UK on Pye International in 1972.

In their review of "My Old Man's Got a Gun", Cashbox stated that "it's only a matter of time before the masses discover one of the most talented female songstresses around today. Well, that time has come as Olivia Newton-John delivers what is destined to become a solid chart item. This outing will please both pop and MOR formats."

== Track listing ==
1. "Angel of the Morning" (Chip Taylor) – 3:54
2. "Just a Little Too Much" (Johnny Burnette) – 2:07
3. "If We Only Have Love" (Eric Blau, Jacques Brel, Mort Shuman) – 3:22
4. "Winterwood" (Don McLean) – 2:48
5. "My Old Man's Got a Gun" (John Farrar) – 2:48
6. "Changes" (Olivia Newton-John) – 2:30
7. "I'm a Small and Lonely Light" (John Farrar, Peter Best) – 2:43
8. "Why Don't You Write Me" (Paul Simon) – 2:38
9. "Mary Skeffington" (Gerry Rafferty) – 2:29
10. "Behind That Locked Door" (George Harrison) – 3:06
11. "What Is Life" (George Harrison) – 3:21
12. "Everything I Own" (David Gates) – 3:00
13. "Living in Harmony" (Alan Tarney, Trevor Spencer) – 2:47
14. "I Will Touch You" (Steve Cagan) – 3:05
