= Let Me Be There (album) =

- Australasian cover

Studio album by Olivia Newton-John
- Released: November 1973
- Recorded: May – June 1973
- Studio: MCA Recording Studios in Universal City California
- Genres: Country; country pop
- Length: 42:09
- Label: Festival / MCA (US)
- Producers: John Farrar; Bruce Welch

Olivia Newton-John chronology
Olivia (1972)	Let Me Be There (1973)	If You Love Me, Let Me Know (1974)

Singles from Let Me Be There
- 1. "Take Me Home, Country Roads" Released: January 1973; 2. "Let Me Be There" Released: September 1973

Let Me Be There is the third studio album by British-Australian singer Olivia Newton-John. It was originally released in November 1973 as Music Makes My Day in the United Kingdom, by Pye International Records, and shortly after in Australia as Let Me Be There, which became its most recognisable name. In the United States and Canada, Let Me Be There was released with an alternative tracklist, combining songs from the original release with other tracks from Newton-John's previous albums If Not for You and Olivia.

Let Me Be There marked a shift in Newton-John's career. She achieved considerable success during her early years in the United Kingdom with some folk-inspired singles, but Let Me Be There marked the beginning of her rise to great popularity in the United States, where this album is widely considered her breakthrough album. Its success also led to a career move towards a more country pop sound that would largely define her next several records. The songs "Take Me Home, Country Roads" and "Let Me Be There" were released as singles from the album. This album received positive reviews at the time of its release.

== Release ==
The American publication of the album by MCA Records used the cover art from Olivia's 1972 LP record Olivia, which was not released by MCA. Some of its songs were taken for the US publication, such as song titles from the British publications of the albums If Not for You and Olivia. The album was not released outside of North America, the UK, Ireland and Australasia. An album with the same title and cover art was released in Japan, but with the same track listing as First Impressions.

Though the title song was a commercial failure in England, it was Olivia Newton-John's first American top ten hit, successfully boosting her singing career in North America. She had previously charted in the Billboard Top 40 with the song "If Not for You".

== Critical reception ==
Professional ratings
Review scores
Source	Rating
AllMusic	4/5 stars

Billboard noted that the album was a "mixture of cuts from previous LP's of this versatile Australian songstress who serves up a pleasing set of country, rock and ballads including her current hit, 'Let Me Be There.'"

Cashbox stated:

Olivia's new LP on MCA is as beautiful as she is, sparkling with the kind of fervent intensity rarely heard from a young performer. Definitely country flavored, the album is a slick combination of ballads and uptempo swingers. The title track is a warm, compelling piece and Olivia really delivers on versions of John Denver's, "Take Me Home, Country Roads" and Kris Kristofferson's "Me And Bobby McGee." There's a beautifully shy but sexy cut of Johnny Burnette's "Just A Little Too Much" and an outstanding version of Dylan's "If Not For You." Olivia has it all.

AllMusic editor Joe Viglione wrote in his retrospective review: "It's early Newton-John, a bit naïve and far from the sophistication of her Warm and Tender release on Geffen, but it works, especially because it contains her first two hit records."

== Chart performance ==
The album was released to capitalize on the success of its title track, which it did well. The song "Let Me Be There" earned Newton-John her first Grammy at the 16th Annual Grammy Awards held March 2, 1974 (in this case for Best Country Female). The album was certified Gold by the RIAA in 1974, and it peaked at No. 54 on the US Pop chart and at No. 1 (for two weeks) on the Country chart.

== Track listing ==
All songs produced by John Farrar and Bruce Welch.

=== Music Makes My Day ===
Side one
No.	Title	Writer(s)	Length
1.	"Take Me Home, Country Roads"	Bill Danoff; Taffy Nivert; John Denver	3:22
2.	"Amoureuse"	Véronique Sanson; Gary Osborne	3:40
3.	"Brotherly Love"	John Farrar	3:21
4.	"Heartbreaker"	Russ Ballard	2:32
5.	"Rosewater"	Newton-John	5:05
6.	"You Ain't Got the Right"	Dennis Locorriere; Ray Sawyer; Ron Haffkine	3:31

Side two
No.	Title	Writer(s)	Length
7.	"Feeling Best"	Glenn Shorrock	3:22
8.	"Being on the Losing End"	Carl Groszmann; Glynne Jones	3:43
9.	"Let Me Be There"	John Rostill	3:03
10.	"Music Makes My Day"	Farrar	3:14
11.	"Leaving"	Doug Flett; Guy Fletcher	3:52
12.	"If We Try"	Don McLean	3:24

=== Let Me Be There ===
In the United States, the album was released with artwork from her 1972 Olivia album and some different songs from this and some earlier Newton-John albums.

Side one
No.	Title	Writer(s)	Length
1.	"Let Me Be There"	Rostill	3:00
2.	"Me and Bobby McGee"	Kris Kristofferson; Fred Foster	3:46
3.	"Banks of the Ohio"	Traditional	3:15
4.	"Love Song"	Lesley Duncan	3:44
5.	"If Not for You"	Bob Dylan	2:50

Side two
No.	Title	Writer(s)	Length
6.	"Take Me Home, Country Roads"	Danoff; Nivert; Denver	3:16
7.	"Angel of the Morning"	Chip Taylor	3:52
8.	"If You Could Read My Mind"	Gordon Lightfoot	3:41
9.	"Help Me Make It Through the Night"	Kristofferson	2:19
10.	"Just a Little Too Much"	Johnny Burnette	2:05

== Personnel ==
Performers and musicians

- Brian Bennett – drums
- Terry Britten – guitar
- Vicki Brown – background vocalist
- Pat Carroll – background vocalist
- John Farrar – arranger, background vocalist, instruments, producer
- Mo Foster – bass
- Cliff Hall – piano
- Jean Hawker – background vocalist
- Alan Hawkshaw – arranger, piano
- Dave Macrae – piano
- Margo Newman – background vocalist
- Olivia Newton-John – vocalist
- Kevin Peek – guitar
- Mike Sammes – background vocalist
- Trevor Spencer – drums
- Alan Tarney – background vocalist, bass
- Bruce Welch – guitar, producer
- Mark Warner – guitar

== Charts ==
=== Weekly charts ===
Weekly chart performance for Let Me Be There
Chart (1974)	Peak position
Canada Top Albums/CDs (RPM)	39
UK Albums (Official Charts)	37
US Billboard 200	54
US Top Country Albums (Billboard)	1
US Cashbox Top Albums	36
US Cashbox Country Albums	3
Japanese Oricon LP Chart	25

=== Year-end charts ===
Year-end chart performance for Let Me Be There
Chart (1974)	Position
US Top Country Albums (Billboard)	2

== Certifications and sales ==
Certifications and sales for Let Me Be There
Region	Certification	Certified units/sales
Canada (Music Canada)	Platinum	100,000^{^}
Japan (Oricon Charts)	—	89,130
United States (RIAA)	Gold	500,000^{^}
^{^} Shipments figures based on certification alone.
