= If Not for You (album) =

1971 album by Olivia Newton-John

- US vinyl variant of standard artwork

Studio album by Olivia Newton-John
- Released: 1 November 1971
- Recorded: May 1971
- Studio: Abbey Road, Studio 2, London
- Genre: Country; country pop
- Length: 35:54
- Label: Festival / UNI (US)
- Producer: John Farrar; Bruce Welch

Olivia Newton-John chronology
If Not for You (1971)	Olivia (1972)

Singles from If Not for You
- 1. "If Not for You" Released: March 1971; 2. "Banks of the Ohio" Released: September 1971

If Not for You is the debut studio album by British-Australian singer-songwriter Olivia Newton-John, released in November 1971 by Festival Records. The album was released on the Pye International label in the UK as Olivia Newton-John, with a slightly different cover.

The album was her first album released by Festival Records, which would release all her albums in Australia until its dissolution in 2005. It also has Newton-John's first works with her long-time musical partner, John Farrar.

As a covers album, If Not for You features mostly songs previously recorded from contemporary artists of the 1960s and early 1970s.

She made several performances to promote If Not for You and her follow-up album, Olivia, including an international tour with British singer Cliff Richard.

== Background and development ==
In 1966, Newton-John released her debut single, a cover of Jackie DeShannon's "Till You Say You'll Be Mine" (with "For Ever" as B-side), by Decca Records. Later, she integrated the band Toomorrow, which released a film and its soundtrack in 1970. After these failed attempts to launch her career, she signed with Festival Records to release an album.

If Not for You was titled after its successful lead single of the same name and was recorded in London, where Newton-John resided at the time. She later stated that she didn't like the song, but praised its production.

The majority of musicians who played on If Not for You were linked with the music group Marvin, Welch & Farrar. The group members John Farrar and Bruce Welch produced the album. Welch was her boyfriend at the time and Farrar is the husband of Australian singer Pat Carroll, a personal friend of Newton-John's, and toured with her in England at clubs and bars as "Pat and Olivia" in 1966.

Farrar would establish a partnership with Newton-John, producing all her studio albums from If Not for You until Soul Kiss, released in 1985. He also composed, played and did background vocals on several Newton-John songs.

Three additional songs were recorded by Newton-John, but were discarded during the album creation process: "The Biggest Clown", "It's So Hard to Say Goodbye" and "Would You Follow Me". The first was released on "If Not for You" single, the second was released on the "Love Song" promo single and later on the 48 Original Tracks compilation album and the third was released on some pressings of "Banks of the Ohio" single and also on 48 Original Tracks.

The album features covers of Kris Kristofferson ("Me and Bobby McGee" and "Help Me Make It Through the Night"), Bread ("If"), The Band ("In a Station"), Lesley Duncan ("Love Song" and "Lullaby"), Bob Dylan ("If Not for You"), Brotherhood of Man ("Where Are You Going to My Love"), Gordon Lightfoot ("If You Could Read My Mind") and Tom Rush ("No Regrets"). "Banks of the Ohio" is a traditional song that had an arrangement made by Farrar and Welch.

== Promotion ==
Newton-John made several appearances on television programs across Europe and her homeland Australia between 1971 and 1972. She also made an appearance on The Dean Martin Show, singing "If" (a cover of a ballad originated earlier in 1971 by the group Bread) and a medley featuring "Just a Little Lovin'" / "True Love" with Dean Martin, which became her first performance in the United States.

In 1972, she embarked on a tour across Europe and Japan with Cliff Richard to promote If Not for You and Olivia, known as The Cliff Richard Show / If Not for You Tour. Olivia performed some songs and also sang backing vocals on Cliff's songs with Pat Carroll. Richard performances were released on the Cliff Richard Live! album.

She also made performances on Richard's program It's Cliff Richard and starred with him in the special Getaway with Cliff and the film The Case, all broadcast on BBC.

=== Singles ===
"If Not for You", the title track, was released as the lead single. The song peaked at number six on the UK Singles Charts and number fourteen on Australia's Go-Set singles chart. It was also an unexpected hit in North America, peaking at number twenty-five on the US Billboard Hot 100 and number eighteen on Canada's RPM top singles chart. The single was Newton-John's first number one on the US Top Easy Listening chart (now Hot Adult Contemporary Tracks).

The second and last single, "Banks of the Ohio", was another success in the United Kingdom (peaking at number six) and Australia (Newton-John's first number one hit in the country), but failed to reach the top forty in Canada and United States, peaking at number sixty-six and ninety-four, respectively.

To promote the album and Newton-John's image, the promotional singles "If You Could Read My Mind" (with "It's So Hard to Say Goodbye" as the B-side) and "Love Song" (with "If" as the B-side) were released in selected European countries.

A German language version of "Banks of the Ohio", titled "Unten Am Fluss, Der Ohio Heisst", was also released.

== Critical reception ==
Professional ratings
Review scores
Source	Rating
AllMusic	4/5 stars

In their review, Billboard noted that "the title tune took this young stylist high on the charts both in the U.S. and Europe and more of her fine sound is found in this LP. She shines on some very beautiful ballads including "If," "Love Song," "Where Are You Going to My Love" and "No Regrets." Especially pretty is her rendition of "Lullaby." Also included is her single "Banks of the Ohio," currently climbing the charts."

Cashbox stated "Olivia made an impressive debut via her single of the Bob Dylan piece, "If Not For You". Now she has come up with a superb album which includes that song and eleven others. She has a lovely unforgettable texture to her voice - listen to "If I Could Read Your Mind," "Help Me Make It Through The Night," "In A Station" and "Where Are You Going To My Love" and see if you don't agree. It's a safe prediction but we're going to make it anyhow - Olivia will become a major star"

Joe Viglione from AllMusic gave a positive review from the album, giving it four out five stars. He commented that "it would be a mistake to think these [songs] are all mere 'covers.' The production and arrangements by Bruce Welch and John Farrar are innovative and worthwhile." Viglione also praised Newton-John's performance, stating: "After all her own hit records, hearing this superstar sing so many familiar tunes, and performing them so well, is utterly charming."

== Commercial performance ==
In Australia, the album debuted at number sixteen in the week of 22 January 1972. If Not for You peaked at number fourteen the next week, staying four weeks on the chart and earning a platinum certification.

Despite the lack of promotion in the country the album made a minor impact in the United States, peaking at number one hundred and fifty-eight on the Billboard 200. In the United Kingdom, where the album hit two singles in the top ten, If Not for You failed to chart.

== Releases ==
The album was originally released on cassette and LP.

The American edition, released by Uni Records prior to its merger with the Decca and Kapp labels to form MCA Records, went out of print following the release of Newton-John's 1973 album, Let Me Be There, and became a rare collector's item. However, the original American edition of Let Me Be There features six tracks from If Not for You.

The album was first released on CD in Japan in 1990 as part of the EMI Pastmasters series (Cat.# CP21-6074). The album was simply called Olivia Newton-John, which was the full title of the original vinyl / cassette release in England in 1971. (It was initially released as Olivia Newton-John in England, and If Not for You in foreign territories, including the US and Australia.) This EMI 1990 CD release did not feature any of the original album artwork. Instead, the front cover photo is a "live" picture of Olivia from a 1977 appearance in Japan. The packaging included a Japanese-language obi, and a folded white paper insert, containing all the song lyrics in English on one side, and in Japanese on the other.

In Australia, Festival Records re-released the album on CD in 1993 and also in a digitally remastered edition along with other albums of Newton-John's discography in 1998. In this latter case, at least the first run of the remastered CD release (Festival Cat.# D34320 / D19809) was seriously botched. The first track on the album, "Me and Bobby McGee", was missing entirely from the CD; thus the CD started with the Bread cover, "If", and contained only 11 of the 12 songs. Further, three of the latter songs on this release were out of sequence, though the CD labeling lists all 12 original songs in their original sequence. However, the overall sonic quality of the 1998 remastered edition was praised.

== Track listing ==
All songs produced by John Farrar and Bruce Welch.

Side one
No.	Title	Writer(s)	Length
1.	"Me and Bobby McGee"	Kris Kristofferson; Fred Foster	3:46
2.	"If"	David Gates	2:40
3.	"Banks of the Ohio"	Traditional; arranged by Bruce Welch and John Farrar	3:15
4.	"In a Station"	Richard Manuel	3:07
5.	"Love Song"	Lesley Duncan	3:44
6.	"Help Me Make It Through the Night"	Kris Kristofferson	2:19

Side two
No.	Title	Writer(s)	Length
7.	"If Not for You"	Bob Dylan	2:50
8.	"Where Are You Going to My Love"	Billy Day; John Goodison; Mike Leslie; Tony Hiller	3:27
9.	"Lullaby"	Lesley Duncan	3:01
10.	"If You Could Read My Mind"	Gordon Lightfoot	3:41
11.	"If I Gotta Leave"	Tony Hiller; Paul Curtis	2:40
12.	"No Regrets"	Tom Rush	3:24
Total length:			35:54

2022 deluxe edition – Disc two
No.	Title	Writer(s)	Length
1.	"Till You Say You'll Be Mine"	Jackie DeShannon	2:34
2.	"For Ever"	Allen & Bailey	2:44
3.	"The Biggest Clown"	John Rostill	2:35
4.	"It's So Hard to Say Goodbye"	Alan Hawkshaw; Ray Cameron	4:03
5.	"Would You Follow Me"	John Kongos	2:59
6.	"Walkin' on Air" (Toomorrow)	Ritchie Adams; Mark Barkan	2:50
7.	"Goin' Back" (Toomorrow)	Adams; Barkan	2:53
8.	"I Could Never Live Without Your Love" (Toomorrow)	Roger Cook; Roger Greenaway; John Goodison	2:31
9.	"Roll Like the River" (Toomorrow)	Robert Lovett; Brian Peacock; Ian Clyne	2:51
10.	"Don't Move Away" (duet with Cliff Richard)	Harold Spiro; Valerie Avon	3:04
11.	"Would You Follow Me" (edit)	John Kongos	2:37
12.	"Round and Round"	John Farrar	3:03
13.	"The Biggest Clown" (alternate version)	John Rostill	2:31
14.	"Game of Love"	Petrina Lordan	2:07
15.	"Would You Follow Me" (alternate version)	John Kongos	3:11
16.	"Unten am Fluß, der Ohio Heißt" (German version of "Banks of the Ohio")	traditional	3:18
17.	"Unten am Fluß, der Ohio Heißt" (instrumental)	traditional	3:17

== Personnel ==
Credits adapted from the album's liner notes.

- Olivia Newton-John – vocals
- John Farrar – guitar
- Dave Richmond – bass guitar
- Brian Bennett – drums, percussion
- Alan Hawkshaw – keyboards
- Peter Vince – engineering
- Bruce Welch – arranger, composer

Production

- John Farrar – arranger, producer
- Alan Hawkshaw – string arrangements
- Bruce Welch – arranger, producer

Design

- David Steen – photography
- Doug McKenzie – photography

Record company

- Festival Records – record label, Australia copyright owner (1971)
- Pye International Records – record label, UK copyright owner (1971)
- Uni Records – record label, US copyright owner (1971)
- Universal Music Group – international distributor, record label, international copyright owner (1996)

== Charts ==
Chart performance for If Not for You
Chart (1971–1972)	Peak position
Australian Albums (Go-Set)	14
US Billboard 200	158
US Cash Box Top Albums	142

== Certifications ==
Region	Certification	Certified units/sales
Australia (ARIA)	Gold	20,000^{^}
^{^} Shipments figures based on certification alone.
