= Making a Good Thing Better (song) =

Single by Olivia Newton-John

from the album Making a Good Thing Better
- Released: June 1977
- Recorded: 1977
- Length: 3:42
- Label: EMI
- Songwriter: Pete Wingfield
- Producer: John Farrar

Olivia Newton-John singles chronology
"Sam" (1977)	"Making a Good Thing Better" (1977)	"Don't Cry for Me Argentina" (1977)

"Making a Good Thing Better" is a song performed by Australian singer Olivia Newton-John. It was written by Pete Wingfield. It was released in June 1977 as the lead single from Newton-John's ninth studio album of the same name and peaked at number 20 on the Easy Listening chart and number 87 on the Hot 100 in the United States.

== Reception ==
Cash Box magazine said "Ms. Newton-John's funkiest performance to date, and with John Farrar's creative production, it all works. Her lead vocal varies in texture and as the verses range from tender to tough, strings and backing vocal tracks could be supporting Aretha Franklin."

== Track listing ==
1. "Making a Good Thing Better" - 3:42
2. "Compassionate Man" - 3:25

== Charts ==
Chart (1977)	Peak position
U.S. Billboard Hot 100	87
U.S. Billboard Easy Listening	20
US Cash Box Country Top 100	76
Canadian Adult Contemporary (RPM)|	32
