= Katie Buckhaven =

British female singer

- Born: 1975 or 1976 (age 48–49); Bedfordshire, England, UK
- Occupation: Singer

Katie Buckhaven is a British female singer whose style is an eclectic mix of jazz and folk songs.

Buckhaven played support to Ben & Jason and Carina Round on the Acoustic Roadworks tour 2001; she has also played with her band at various venues in London.

Buckhaven has also toured Europe, playing solo gigs in bars in Paris, Seville, and Berlin where she sang in French, Spanish, and Italian.

== Discography ==
- Katie Buckhaven – 2005
- Forever Can Wait – The Big Untidy EP
- The Girl in the White Dress – 2010
