= If You Love Me, Let Me Know =

Studio album by Olivia Newton-John
- Released: 28 May 1974
- Recorded: 1974
- Studios: Abbey Road Studios and CSS, London
- Genre: Country pop
- Length: 31:08
- Label: MCA
- Producers: John Farrar, Bruce Welch

Olivia Newton-John chronology
Let Me Be There (1973)	If You Love Me, Let Me Know (1974)	Long Live Love (1974)

Singles from If You Love Me, Let Me Know
- 1. "If You Love Me (Let Me Know)" Released: April 2, 1974; 2. "I Honestly Love You" Released: August 6, 1974

If You Love Me, Let Me Know is the fourth studio album by singer Olivia Newton-John, released on 28 May 1974 in North America only. Other than the title track, 3 songs were from her previous two international albums, Olivia (1972), Music Makes My Day (1973) and 6 were released just 1 month later on her international album, Long Live Love (1974). It was her first album to top the Billboard Pop album chart as well as her first million selling LP in America. This album received very positive reviews from music critics at the time of its release its widely considered one of Olivia's best early albums.

Two hit singles were released from the album, the title song and "I Honestly Love You", the latter of which became Newton-John's first number-one US single, and her signature song as well. Furthermore, the song earned Olivia her second and third Grammy Awards on March 1, 1975, at the 17th Annual Grammy Awards.

== Background ==
Six of the tracks on the album are from her European and Australian release, Long Live Love, two are tracks from Olivia and one from Music Makes My Day. The title song has the distinction of not having been released on any of Olivia's international studio albums, although it did show up on her first international hits collection, First Impressions, and was added onto the end of her next studio album, Have You Never Been Mellow, when that was released in Australia in early 1975.

== Reception ==
It was the first of two Newton-John albums to top the Billboard 200 pop albums chart, the second being Have You Never Been Mellow the following year. Two hit singles were culled from the LP in the US: the title song (No. 5) and "I Honestly Love You", which became Newton-John's first number-one single in the US after listener requests for the song prompted MCA to release it as a single, much to Newton-John's delight after she originally pleaded with the label to release it as such. Both songs reached the top 10 of the US Pop, Adult Contemporary and Country charts, affirming Newton-John's status as the top female country-crossover star of the day and continuing the chart hot streak begun with the Grammy-winning "Let Me Be There" the previous year.

The title track ranks as Newton-John's highest-charting single on the country charts, reaching No. 2, although she would have more top 10 hits.

The album was certified Gold in the US.

The album was nominated for the Country Music Association Award for Album of the Year in 1974 and was the first album by a non-American artist to be nominated.

== Reviews ==
Professional ratings
Review scores
Source	Rating
AllMusic	4.5/5 stars

Billboard noted "though she has scored heavily in recent months as a singer of country flavored tune, Olivia Newton-John began her career as a pop and folk singer and this LP is her best showcase yet of her all around abilities. The country material is here, but so are folky tunes, soft rock cuts and straight ballads. While the artist does not have the most powerful voice in the world, she makes superb use of the range she does have and the production of John Farrar and Bruce Welch help."

AllMusic editor Joe Viglione wrote in his retrospective review that "If You Love Me Let Me Know works on many levels, and is a strong chapter in Olivia's catalog....The album is beautifully produced by John Farrar with his friend Bruce Welch of Marvin, Welch & Farrar fame helping out with the production on two of the tracks, Gerry Rafferty's "Mary Skeffington" and Olivia Newton-John's sole composition, the acoustic "Changes." The singer is a very good songwriter, and why she didn't put more songs together, or cover some of the wonderful material her mentor was releasing elsewhere, is something to speculate.

== Track listing ==
Side one

1. "If You Love Me (Let Me Know)" (John Rostill) (1974)
2. "Mary Skeffington" (Gerry Rafferty) from Olivia (1972)
3. "Country Girl" (Alan Hawkshaw, Peter Gosling) from Long Live Love (1974)
4. "I Honestly Love You" (Peter Allen, Jeff Barry) from Long Live Love (1974)
5. "Free the People" (Barbara Keith) from Long Live Love (1974)

Side two

1. "The River's Too Wide" (Bob Morrison) from Long Live Love (1974)
2. "Home Ain't Home Anymore" (John Farrar, Peter Robinson) from Long Live Love (1974)
3. "God Only Knows" (Brian Wilson, Tony Asher) from Long Live Love (1974)
4. "Changes" (Olivia Newton-John) from Olivia (1972)
5. "You Ain't Got the Right" (Dennis Locorriere, Ray Sawyer, Ron Haffkine, Jay David) from Music Makes My Day (1973)

== Personnel ==
- Brian Bennett, Trevor Spencer - drums
- Pat Carrol - background vocals
- Pat Carroll - vocals
- John Farrar - guitar, vocals
- Mo Foster - bass
- Cliff Hall, Alan Hawkshaw, Alan Hawson, Dave MacRae - piano
- Vicki Brown, Jean Hawker, Margo Newman, Olivia Newton-John, Mike Sammes Singers - vocals, background vocals
- Terry Britten, Kevin Peek, Bruce Welch, Mark Warner - guitar
- Alan Tarney - bass, vocals, background vocals

== Charts ==
=== Weekly charts ===
Chart (1974)	Peak position
US Billboard 200	1
US Top Country Albums (Billboard)	1
US Cash Box Top Albums	1
US Cash Box Country Albums	1

=== Year-end charts ===
Chart (1974)	Position
US Top Country Albums (Billboard)	5
The Top Albums of '74 (RPM Magazine)	22
Chart (1975)	Position
US Top Country Albums (Billboard)	12

== Certifications and sales ==
Region	Certification	Certified units/sales
Canada (Music Canada)	2× Platinum	200,000^{^}
United States (RIAA)	Gold	500,000^{^}
^{^} Shipments figures based on certification alone.
