= Long Live Love (album) =

Studio album by Olivia Newton-John
- Released: 24 June 1974
- Recorded: 1974
- Studio: Abbey Road and CSS, London
- Genre: Country; country pop
- Length: 36:46
- Label: EMI
- Producer: John Farrar, Bruce Welch

Olivia Newton-John chronology
If You Love Me, Let Me Know (1974)	Long Live Love (1974)	First Impressions (1974)

Singles from Long Live Love
- 1. "Long Live Love" Released: March 1974

Professional ratings
Review scores
Source	Rating
AllMusic	3/5 stars
Encyclopedia of Popular Music	2/5 stars

Long Live Love is the fifth studio album by British-Australian singer Olivia Newton-John, released on 24 June 1974 by EMI Records.

== Singles ==
The title track was released in March 1974. Newton-John performed it at the 1974 Eurovision Song Contest when she represented the UK. Along with the title track, five other tracks from the LP had been the six shortlisted songs for the UK selection for Eurovision, broadcast as A Song for Europe, 1974. The song that placed second, "Angel Eyes", was also released as the B-side of the "Long Live Love" single. (The other four songs were "Someday", "Loving You Ain't Easy", "Have Love, Will Travel", and "Hands Across the Sea".)

== Track listing ==
=== Side one ===
1. "Free the People" (Barbara Keith) – 3:20
2. "Angel Eyes" (Tony Macaulay, Keith Potger) – 2:45
3. "Country Girl" (Alan Hawkshaw, Peter Gosling) – 3:49
4. "Someday" (Gary Benson, David Mindel) – 2:57
5. "God Only Knows" (Brian Wilson, Tony Asher) – 2:48
6. "Loving You Ain't Easy" (Stuart Leathwood, Bob Saker, Gary Sulsh) – 2:47

=== Side two ===
1. "Home Ain't Home Anymore" (John Farrar, Peter Robinson) – 2:52
2. "Have Love, Will Travel" (Roger Greenaway, Geoff Stephens) – 2:45
3. "I Honestly Love You" (Peter Allen, Jeff Barry) – 3:38
4. "Hands Across the Sea" (Ben Findon, Geoff Wilkins) – 2:55
5. "The River's Too Wide" (Bob Morrison) – 3:16
6. "Long Live Love" (Valerie Avon, Harold Spiro) – 2:46

=== Japanese bonus tracks ===
1. "Mon Amour, Mon Impossible Amour" – 3:40
2. "Long Live Love" (German version) – 2:48

== Personnel ==
- John Farrar, Nick Ingman, Alan Hawkshaw, Brian Bennett – arrangements
- John Kelly – photography

== Charts ==
Chart (1974)	Peak position
Australian Albums (Kent Music Report)	19
UK Albums (OCC)	40

== Certifications ==
Region	Certification	Certified units/sales
Australia (ARIA)	Platinum	50,000^{^}
^{^} Shipments figures based on certification alone.
