= Let Me Be There =

Single by Olivia Newton-John

from the album Let Me Be There
- B-side: "Maybe Then I'll Think of You" (most of the world); "If Not for You" (Japan)
- Released: September 1973
- Genre: Country, pop
- Length: 3:02
- Label: Festival
- Songwriter: John Rostill
- Producers: Bruce Welch, John Farrar

Olivia Newton-John singles chronology
"Take Me Home, Country Roads" (1973)	"Let Me Be There" (1973)	"Long Live Love" (1974)

"Let Me Be There" is a popular song written by John Rostill. It was first recorded by Olivia Newton-John and released in September 1973 as the second single from her studio album of the same name. The country-influenced song was Newton-John's first Top 10 single in the US, peaking at No. 6, and also won her a Grammy Award for Best Female Country Vocalist. Mike Sammes sings a bass vocal harmony on the song.

== Chart performance ==
=== Weekly charts ===
Chart (1973–1974)	Peak position
Australia (Kent Music Report)	11
Canada Top Singles (RPM)	5
Canada Adult Contemporary (RPM)	3
Canada Country Singles (RPM)	11
Israel (Israeli Singles Chart)	25
New Zealand (Listener)	11
US Cashbox	4
US Billboard Hot 100	6
US Adult Contemporary (Billboard)	3
US Hot Country Songs (Billboard)	7
Quebec (ADISQ)	19

Chart (2022)	Peak position
Canada Digital Song Sales (Billboard)	30
U.S. Digital Song Sales (Billboard)	31

=== Year-end charts ===
Chart (1974)	Rank
Australia (Kent Music Report)	53
Canada Top Singles	71
US Cashbox	22
US Billboard Hot 100	26

== Certifications and sales ==
Region	Certification	Certified units/sales
Canada (Music Canada)	Platinum	150,000^{^}
United States (RIAA)	Gold	1,000,000^{^}
^{^} Shipments figures based on certification alone.

== Cover versions ==
- "Let Me Be There" was recorded live by Elvis Presley, and sung at many concerts until his death in 1977. Probably the most noted Elvis rendition was recorded on 20 March 1974 live at a concert in Memphis, Tennessee. Most of that concert was released on 7 July 1974 as the album Elvis Recorded Live on Stage in Memphis. The cover of "Let Me Be There" from that show was also released as track 5 on the Moody Blue album on 19 July 1977.
- Lynn Anderson for her 1974 album Smile for Me.
- Ike & Tina Turner for their 1974 album Sweet Rhode Island Red.
- Tanya Tucker for her gold album Would You Lay with Me (In a Field of Stone) in 1974 and included on several greatest hits compilations.
- Conway Twitty and Loretta Lynn on their 1975 LP Feelins'.
- Melinda Schneider and Beccy Cole on their album Great Women of Country (2014).
- Delta Goodrem in the mini-series Olivia Newton-John: Hopelessly Devoted to You, and the accompanying soundtrack album, I Honestly Love You where she did "Let Me Be There" with Newton-John herself.
