= Banks of the Ohio =

19th-century murder ballad

"Banks of the Ohio" (Roud 157, Laws F5), also known as "Down on the Banks of the Ohio" and "I'll Never Be Yours", is a 19th-century murder ballad, written by unknown authors. The lyrics tell of "Willie" who invites his young lover for a walk during which she rejects his marriage proposal, and once they are alone on the river bank, he murders the young woman.

The song was first recorded by country musicians such as Clarence Horton Greene in 1927, and has been performed by many country and folk singers since. Olivia Newton-John released a version in 1971 and her recording reached No. 1 in Australia and No. 6 in the UK.

== Background ==
The song is similar to other murder ballads in the idiom of songs such as "The Lexington Murder" and "The Knoxville Girl". These ballads may be traced back to the British broadside tradition of songs dated to at least the end of 18th century, such as "The Oxford Girl" and "The Berkshire Tragedy" (Roud 263; Laws P35), songs that may have been based on real events. In these songs, the murderer posing as the narrator asked a girl to walk with him to talk about marriage; he then attacked and killed her, throwing her body into the river, a crime for which he would be hanged.

"Banks of the Ohio" also has some superficial similarity to "Omie Wise" and "Pretty Polly", songs which are also generally narrated in the first person by a killer called Willie, but differing significantly in the narrative; the killer explains why he killed his love, and spends much of the song expressing his sorrow and regret. Musically, it is distinguished by a long refrain which calmly reflects the love and the hopes for the future which he felt before the murder. This gives a different psychological tone to the song, and accompanying singers (or indeed the audience) the possibility of singing along in chorus.

Another, less-well-known version of the song is entitled "On the Banks of the Old Pedee". The lyrics of "Banks of the Ohio" are sometimes adapted for a female singer.

Commercial recordings of the song started in August 1927 with a country version by Red Patterson's Piedmont Log Rollers (as "Down by the Banks of the Ohio"), and by Grayson and Whitter (as "I'll Never Be Yours") the same year as one of their first recordings for Gennett. Other early country music stars who recorded the song included Ernest Stoneman (1928), Clayton McMichen (1931), The Callahan Brothers (1934), The Blue Sky Boys (1936), and The Monroe Brothers (1936). The Blue Sky Boys partly rearranged the song and their version appears on the soundtrack of the 1973 film Paper Moon.

== Olivia Newton-John version ==
"Banks of the Ohio"
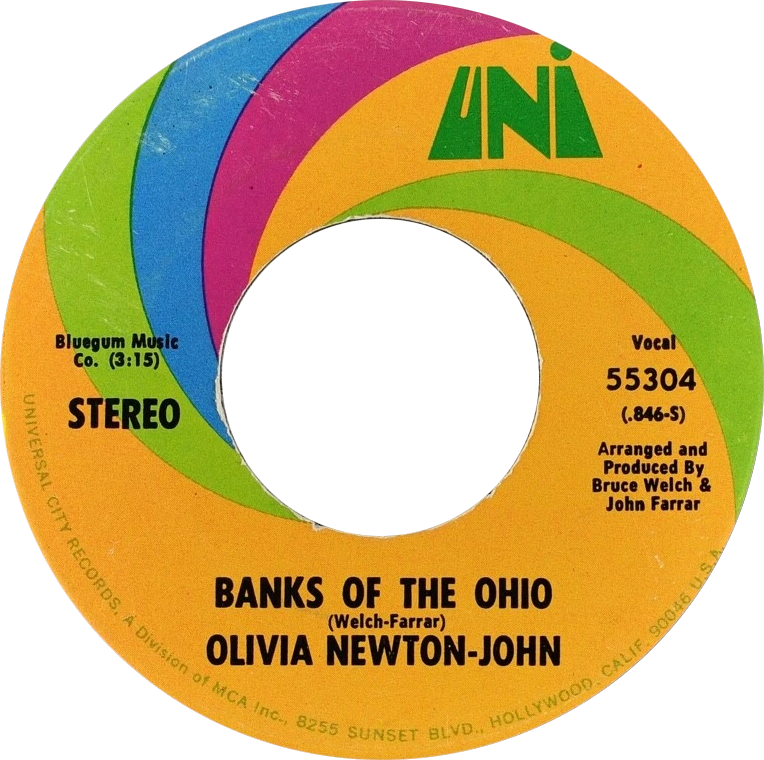
- US single of the Olivia Newton-John recording

Single by Olivia Newton-John

from the album If Not for You
- Released: October 1971
- Recorded: May 1971
- Studio: Abbey Road, Studio 2, London
- Genre: Pop
- Length: 3:15
- Label: Decca
- Songwriter: Traditional
- Producers: Bruce Welch, John Farrar

Olivia Newton-John singles chronology
"If Not for You" (1971)	"Banks of the Ohio" (1971)	"What Is Life" (1972)

Official audio
- "Banks of the Ohio" on YouTube

Olivia Newton-John recorded an arrangement of the song by John Farrar and Bruce Welch in 1971, for her album If Not for You. It was released as the second single from the album after its title track "If Not for You", and it became her first number one hit in Australia, reaching the top of the Go-Set Chart in November 1971. It was also successful in the UK, peaking at number 6, but failed to reach the top 40 in Canada and the US, peaking at number 69 and 94, respectively. The distinctive bass backing vocals were provided by English musician and vocal session arranger Mike Sammes.

The track was recorded May 1971 at Abbey Road, Studio 2, in London In Newton-John's version, the prospective bride murders her male lover, after he refuses to marry her.

=== Track listing ===
1. "Banks of the Ohio" – 3:15
2. "Love Song" – 3:44

=== Charts ===
Chart (1971)	Peak position
Australia (Go-Set)	1
Canada Top Singles (RPM)	66
Germany (GfK)	13
Ireland (IRMA)	9
Israel (Israeli Singles Chart)	20
New Zealand (Listener Chart)	3
South Africa	9
UK Singles (Official Charts)	6
US Cashbox	94
US Billboard Hot 100	94
US Adult Contemporary (Billboard)	34

== Certifications ==
Region	Certification	Certified units/sales
Australia (ARIA)	Gold	50,000^{^}
^{^} Shipments figures based on certification alone.

== Other recordings ==
The song was recorded for the American folk music revival market by Bascom Lamar Lunsford (1953) and by the traditional singer Ruby Vass on a 1959 field recording made by Alan Lomax and issued on the LP (and subsequent CD) series Southern Journey. It was recorded by the Kossoy Sisters for their 1956 album Bowling Green and Other Folk Songs from the Southern Mountains. It was also recorded several times by Joan Baez: in 1959 as the opening track for the album Folksingers 'Round Harvard Square; in 1961 in her album Joan Baez, Vol. 2; on the 1968 Newport Folk Festival album; and other recordings. It was included on the 2011 CD compilation Voice of the People.

Lomax made a further field recording, in 1961, at his New York City apartment, featuring veteran singer Clarence Ashley, accompanied by Fred Price (fiddle), and Clint Howard and Doc Watson (guitars). The recording, filmed by George Pickow and with sound by Jean Ritchie, was later used by Anna Lomax Wood for the short film Ballads, Blues and Bluegrass. Another recording by this group was issued on Old Time Music at Clarence Ashley's reissued as Original Folkways Recordings: 1960–1962 (1994). Also for Folkways, Doc Watson performed the song as a duet with Bill Monroe in 1963.

Tony Rice recorded the song on his eponymous 1977 album. A Swedish version, recorded by Ann-Louise Hanson, is entitled "Tag emot en utsträckt hand".

Other folk revival artists who recorded the song included the New Lost City Ramblers and Pete Seeger. Artists who returned the song to country music audiences included Johnny Cash with The Carter Family and Porter Wagoner. Charley Pride on his "Make mine country" album. Other recordings were made by The Wolfe Tones, Arlo Guthrie (as "Arloff Boguslavaki", on the 1972 Earl Scruggs album I Saw the Light), Dave Guard and the Whiskeyhill Singers, Mike Ireland and Holler, Gangstagrass featuring Alexa Dirks also giving a faithful rendition on their 2014 album Broken Hearts and Stolen Money. Dolly Parton recorded the song in 2013, for her album Blue Smoke.

The song appears in, and gives the title for, the 2013 album Oh, Willie, Please... a collection of folk murder ballads, by alt-folk musical project Vandaveer. The band made a live 78 acetate recording in 2011.

A Czech version, entitled "Náklaďák", was recorded by Petra Černocká, as a single in 1975 and was later recorded as the title track for her 1994 album.

A German version, titled "Das Haus am Rhein" was released in Michael Holm's 1981 album "Im Jahr der Liebe".

A Slovenian version, titled "Dravski most" (The Drava Bridge) was recorder by Neca Falk in 1994. The lyrics were adapted by a well known Slovenian singer-songwriter Tomaž Domicelj.

A Hungarian version, titled "Ohio", was recorded by the country band 100 Folk Celsius in 1995. The lyrics were adapted by the Hungarian singer-songwriter András Muzsay.

== Legacy ==
The song and its title served as the theme song for, and title of, a long-running radio series broadcast of bluegrass music on WAMU-PBS and Bluegrass Country, hosted by Fred Bartenstein and produced for the International Bluegrass Music Museum, near the Ohio River in Owensboro, Kentucky.

Michigan bluegrass singer Missy Armstrong has recorded a play on this song entitled "Ain't Going Down to the River", in which the female singer recognizes that in too many songs, girls get killed at the banks of too many rivers.
