= Lesley Duncan =

English singer-songwriter (1943–2010)

- Born: 12 August 1943; Stockton-on-Tees, England
- Died: 12 March 2010 (aged 66); Isle of Mull, Scotland
- Other name: Lesley Cox
- Spouses: Jimmy Horowitz (m. 1970; div. 1978); Tony Cox (m. 1978)
- Children: 2
- Musical career
- Genres: Folk-pop; pop; soft rock
- Instruments: Vocals; guitar; mandolin
- Labels: EMI, Columbia

Lesley Anne Cox (née Duncan; 12 August 1943 – 12 March 2010) was an English singer-songwriter best known for her work during the 1970s. She received much airplay on British radio stations such as BBC Radio 1 and BBC Radio 2, but never achieved greater commercial success, in part because of her unwillingness to chase stardom as well as crippling stage fright.

== Early life ==
Duncan was born in Stockton-on-Tees on 12 August 1943 and left school while only 14 years old. At 19, while working in a London coffee bar, she and her brother were placed on weekly retainers by a music publisher. Within a year, Duncan had signed her first recording contract, with EMI, and appeared in the film What a Crazy World.

== Career ==
=== "Love Song" ===
Duncan is considered one of Britain's first female singer-songwriters. Her songs included "Everything Changes" and "Sing Children Sing", and the song for which she is best known, "Love Song". Elton John recorded a duet with Duncan of the song, similar to her solo version, for his album Tumbleweed Connection. She appeared onstage with John in concert at the Royal Festival Hall on 18 May 1974, to perform the duet once again. The live recording of "Love Song" was included on John's Here and There album. John described "Love Song" as "one of the very few" songs he did not co-author but included on an album earlier in his career. "Love Song" went on to be covered by more than 150 other artists, including David Bowie. In 2022, both Duncan and John's versions of the song were featured in the folk horror film Men. This success notwithstanding, and despite their receiving critical acclaim, Duncan's multiple solo albums failed to achieve commercial success.

Olivia Newton-John recorded "Love Song" and it was included in her 1971 debut album, If Not For You, as well as her remastered reissue of her greatest hits, the double album Vol.1-Deluxe Edition released in 2022.

=== Backing vocalist ===
In addition to writing and singing her own material, Duncan was in wide demand as a session singer during the mid to late 1960s, most notably working with Dusty Springfield from 1964 to 1972, a favour Springfield returned by performing backing vocals for several Duncan recordings. Duncan can be seen on many of the performances featured in the BBC DVD Dusty at the BBC. She worked frequently with her colleague Madeline Bell, including on many Springfield sessions, as well as providing backing vocals on a number of notable pop and rock recordings such as the 1969 Donovan hit single "Barabajagal".

Duncan again joined Elton John at his request to provide vocals for his 1971 album Madman Across the Water, and in exchange John played piano on her first solo album, Sing Children Sing. She also co-wrote three songs with Scott Walker for the Walker Brothers in addition to providing backing vocals for them. She can also be heard on the studio recording of Jesus Christ Superstar.

Duncan famously contributed backing vocals to one of the top selling albums of all time, Pink Floyd's 1973 release The Dark Side of the Moon, which was engineered by Alan Parsons. Later, in 1979, she again worked with Parsons, singing lead vocals on the song "If I Could Change Your Mind" for the Alan Parsons Project album Eve, in her final album appearance.

== Personal life ==
Duncan was first married to Jimmy Horowitz, who produced her early albums. They had two sons together. In 1978, Duncan married Tony Cox, a record producer. They later moved to the Isle of Mull, Scotland, in 1996, where most residents came to know her as a cheerful gardener, knowing nothing of her prior musical career. By all accounts content to lead a more private, family-oriented life in her later years, she died on 12 March 2010 of cerebrovascular disease, following an extended illness.

== Discography ==
=== Albums ===
- Sing Children Sing (1971)
- Earth Mother (1972)
- Everything Changes (1974)
- Moon Bathing (1975)
- Maybe It's Lost (1977)

=== Compilations ===
- Sing Lesley Sing: The RCA and CBS Recordings 1968–1972 (2017) – first two albums and bonus tracks
- Love Song: Previously Unreleased 1977–86 (2018)
- Lesley Step Lightly: The GM Recordings Plus 1974–1982 (2019) – last three albums and bonus tracks

=== UK singles ===
- "I Want a Steady Guy" (as 'Lesley Duncan and the Jokers') b/w "Moving Away" (1963) – Parlophone R5034
- "You Kissed Me Boy" b/w "Tell Me" (1963) – Parlophone R5106
- "When My Baby Cries" b/w "Did It Hurt" (1963) – Mercury MF830
- "Just for the Boy" b/w "See That Guy" (1965) – Mercury MF847
- "Run to Love" b/w "Only the Lonely and Me" (1965) – Mercury MF876
- "Hey Boy" b/w "I Go to Sleep" (1966) – Mercury MF939
- "Lullaby" b/w "I Love You, I Love You" (1968) – RCA 1746
- "A Road to Nowhere" b/w "Love Song" (1969) – RCA 1783
- "Sing Children Sing" b/w "Exactly Who You Are" (1969) – CBS 4585
- "Love Song" b/w "Exactly Who You Are" (1970) – Columbia 4-45354
- "Sing Children Sing" b/w "Emma" (1971) – CBS S 7493
- "Earth Mother" b/w "Love Will Never Lose You" (1972) – CBS S 8362
- "Watch the Tears" b/w "Sam" (1974) – GM GMS 016
- "Everything Changes" b/w "Love Melts Away" (1974) – GM GMS 022
- "I Can See Where I'm Going" b/w "Heaven Knows" (1975) – GM GMS 036
- "Could've Been a Winner" b/w "Moonbathing" (1975) – GM GMS 9040
- "Maybe It's Lost" b/w "Another Rainy Day" (1977) – GM GMS 9046
- "The Sky's on Fire" b/w "Don't Worry 'Bout It" (1977) – GM GMS 9048
- "The Magic's Fine" b/w "Paper Highways" (1978) – GM GMS 9049
- "Sing Children Sing" b/w "Rainbow Games" (1979) – CBS S8061 (Charity 45)
- "Masters of War" b/w "Another Light Goes Out" (1982) – Korova KOW 22
- "Tomorrow" b/w "Paper Highway" (1986) – R4 FOR 4
