= If Not for You =

1970 song by Bob Dylan

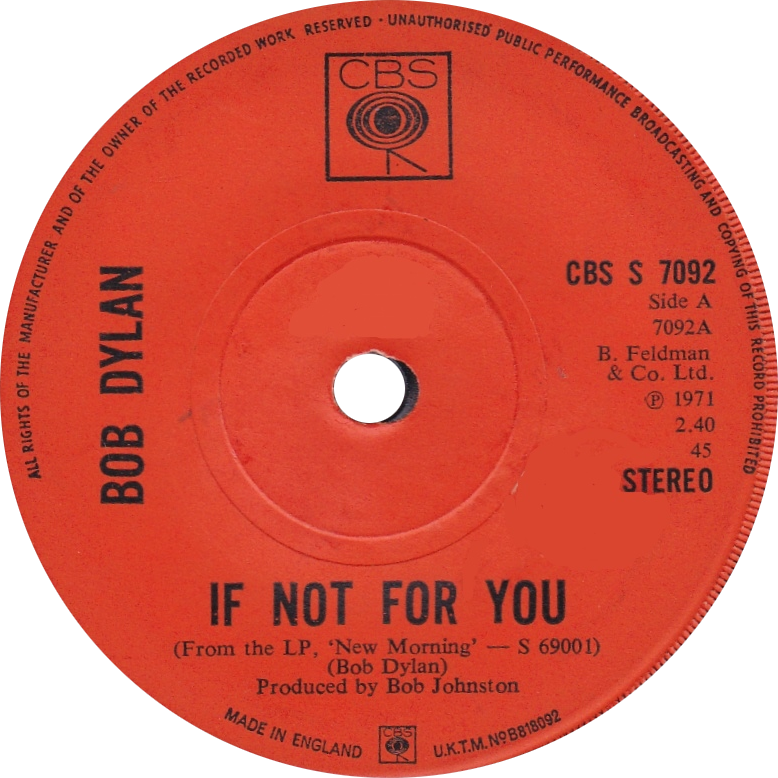
- UK single (solid centre) of the Bob Dylan recording

Single by Bob Dylan

from the album New Morning
- B-side: "New Morning"
- Released: Early 1971
- Recorded: August 12, 1970
- Genre: Country rock
- Length: 2:39
- Label: Columbia
- Songwriter: Bob Dylan
- Producer: Bob Johnston

Bob Dylan singles chronology
"Wigwam" (1970)	"If Not for You" (1971)	"Watching the River Flow" (1971)

Official audio
- "If Not for You" (alternative take) by Bob Dylan on YouTube
- "If Not for You" by Bob Dylan on YouTube

"If Not for You" is a song by American singer-songwriter Bob Dylan from his October 1970 album New Morning. It was issued as the A-side of a single in Europe in early 1971. The song is a love song to Dylan's first wife, Sara Dylan. He recorded it several times in 1970; the session for the released version took place in New York in August. He also recorded the song with George Harrison on May 1, soon after the break-up of the Beatles, a session that attracted much speculation in the music press. The May recording remained unreleased until its inclusion on The Bootleg Series Volumes 1–3 (Rare & Unreleased) in 1991.

In November 1970, Harrison released a version of "If Not for You" on his triple album All Things Must Pass. Another well-known cover was recorded by Olivia Newton-John in 1971, using Harrison's arrangement of the song. Newton-John's version became her first hit single, peaking at number 7 on the UK Singles Chart, as well as the title track to her debut album, If Not for You. That same year, Harrison and Dylan rehearsed the song for possible inclusion in the Concert for Bangladesh shows at Madison Square Garden in New York City. Footage of this rehearsal appeared early in the 1972 documentary film The Concert for Bangladesh and the complete performance was included in the 2005 DVD release.

== Composition ==
Bob Dylan wrote "If Not for You" as a love song to his wife Sara. It was one of several songs he wrote in 1970 that conveyed his contentment with family life and celebrated the simple pleasures of nature. Music journalist Thomas Ward describes it as "a song of rustic charms, heavily indebted to the simplest of country music". He says that the lyrics favor "concise, economical descriptions" over "elegant poetry", a quality he finds most evident in the bridge lines "If not for you, my sky would fall / Rain would gather too / If not for you, I'd be nowhere at all / I'd be lost, if not for you."

Commenting on the track in the 1980s, Dylan said: "It seemed simple enough, sort of Tex-Mex. I would never explore all the possibilities of instrumentation in the studio, add parts and so forth, change the beat around, so it came off kind of folky."

== Recording ==
Dylan first recorded "If Not for You" in March 1970, late in the sessions for his Self Portrait double LP, although it was never intended for that album. He then recorded a new version on May 1 with George Harrison at Columbia Records' Studio B in New York. Charlie Daniels, who played bass at the session, with Russ Kunkel on drums, described it as "a day I'll never forget", adding: "It wasn't Bob Dylan and George Harrison. It was four guys in the studio making music ... It was such a nice thing, such a great day, hour after hour." News of the collaboration between Dylan and Harrison caused considerable excitement in the music press, even though Columbia made a point of announcing that neither artist deemed the results worthy of release.

According to biographer Clinton Heylin, the May 1 session was "the true starting point" for Dylan's New Morning album. The remake of "If Not for You" was under consideration for the album, although Dylan recorded a new version in early June, and Al Kooper, Dylan's co-producer, preferred the March recording. Overdubs were added to one of these versions at Columbia's studio in Nashville on July 23.

Citing Kooper's frustration with Dylan at this time, Heylin says that the singer's indecisiveness led to him re-recording "If Not for You" once more, as well as "Time Passes Slowly", on August 12. Guitarist Buzz Feiten was among the musicians at the session, which took place at Columbia's Studio E in New York. It was the only song on New Morning to include Dylan playing harmonica. After Kooper and Dylan fell out, Bob Johnston was credited as sole producer. (Note: Dylan had also grown disaffected with Johnston. According to Kooper, Dylan said he had to credit Johnston for contractual reasons.)

== Release ==
The August 1970 version of "If Not for You" was sequenced as the opening track of New Morning. Columbia released the album on October 21. It was viewed as a return to form by many music critics after the poorly received Self Portrait. Reviewing for Rolling Stone, Ed Ward described "If Not for You" as "a kind of invocation to the muse, if you will", and said that in contrast to Dylan's 1966 love song "I Want You", "He's celebrating the fact that not only has he found her, but they know each other well, and get strength from each other, depend on each other." Geoffrey Cannon of The Guardian likened the song to "Let It Be Me" from Self Portrait, adding: "except that it's not lush. It's clipped and sceptical ... his voice is harsher than it has been lately; and he plays a lacerating harmonica." (Note: Cannon concluded: "This number isn't 'It Ain't Me, Babe'. But it isn't romantic, either.")

"If Not for You" became the album's most popular track. Issued as a single A-side in Europe, the song peaked at number 30 on the Dutch Single Top 100 chart in April 1971. Dylan considered following up the album's success with a series of concerts but chose to delay his return to live performance and continue to focus on his and Sara's family life. He relented only to appear at Harrison's Concert for Bangladesh benefit shows in August 1971. Dylan rehearsed "If Not for You" with Harrison before the concerts, but did not include the song in his set the following day.

Dylan included "If Not for You" on Bob Dylan's Greatest Hits Vol. II, a double album he compiled in late 1971 to placate Columbia in the absence of a new studio album. The song has subsequently appeared on the Dylan compilations Masterpieces (1978), Biograph (1985), The Best of Bob Dylan (1997), The Essential Bob Dylan (2000), Dylan (2007), Playlist: The Very Best of Bob Dylan '70s (2009), and The Real ... (2012).

The May 1 version with Harrison, Daniels and Kunkel was released on the 1991 Dylan box set The Bootleg Series Volumes 1–3 (Rare & Unreleased). A June 2, 1970, outtake of "If Not for You", featuring only vocal, piano and violin, was included on The Bootleg Series Vol. 10: Another Self Portrait (1969–1971), released in 2013. Music critic Robert Christgau said it was the only track from New Morning that was "any good" on Another Self Portrait, adding: "But that's also an unruinable song. It is pretty straightforward and a wonderful love song and doesn't have any parallels in Dylan's body of work that I can think of." A previously unissued version of the song appeared on the 2015 album Dylan, Cash, and the Nashville Cats: A New Music City, coinciding with the Country Music Hall of Fame's exhibition of the same name. This take was from the Nashville overdubbing session and features Lloyd Green on pedal steel guitar.

Dylan first played "If Not for You" in concert in April 1992, during a show in Sydney. He has performed the song 89 times in total, with the last performance taking place in November 2004. In 2016, Simon & Schuster's Atheneum imprint published the children's book If Not for You, containing artist David Walker's nature-themed illustrations inspired by the song's lyrics.

== George Harrison version ==
"If Not for You"

Song by George Harrison

from the album All Things Must Pass
- Released: November 27, 1970
- Length: 3:29
- Label: Apple
- Songwriter: Bob Dylan
- Producers: George Harrison, Phil Spector

Audio
- "If Not for You" by George Harrison on YouTube

George Harrison included "If Not for You" on his first post-Beatles solo album, All Things Must Pass, released on November 27, 1970. He first taped a solo performance of the song when previewing potential material for his co-producer, Phil Spector, at EMI Studios in London. Recorded in late May, this recital also included Dylan's "I Don't Want to Do It" and the Harrison–Dylan collaboration "Nowhere to Go" (originally "When Everybody Comes to Town"), both of which originated from Harrison's time in Woodstock with Dylan and the Band in late 1968. The three performances became available in the 1990s on the bootleg compilation Beware of ABKCO!

The basic track for Harrison's formal recording of "If Not for You" was recorded at EMI between late May and early June 1970. In author Simon Leng's view, Harrison created a characteristically melody-centric version of the song, which more clearly defines its verse and bridge sections and eschews Dylan's preference for spontaneity in favor of "aural pleasure". The arrangement includes multiple acoustic guitars and a slide guitar motif that Harrison had played during the May 1 session with Dylan. Leng also highlights the significance of Harrison's introduction to the Dobro, via guitarist David Bromberg, as another legacy of his 1970 visit to New York. Peter Frampton played one of the acoustic guitar parts on the song. (Note: Drummer Alan White has said that John Lennon was one of the rhythm guitarists, along with Ringo Starr on tambourine. Neither Leng nor Beatles historian Bruce Spizer list Lennon among the musicians on the completed track, however.) According to the EMI master tape, the instrumentation also includes harmonium, piano and organ.

Music historians Philippe Margotin and Jean-Michel Guesdon describe "If Not for You" as "one of Dylan's songs with the strongest connection to the Fab Four". It was sequenced as the second track on side two of Harrison's triple album, before "Behind That Locked Door", which he had written as a tribute to Dylan before the latter's performance at the 1969 Isle of Wight Festival. The album opened with "I'd Have You Anytime", a Harrison–Dylan collaboration that documented the two songwriters' meeting in Woodstock. (Note: Another All Things Must Pass track, "Apple Scruffs", was performed by Harrison in Dylan's original style of strummed acoustic guitar and harmonica.) According to Beatles biographer Nicholas Schaffner, Dylan therefore had a tangible presence on All Things Must Pass, "in spirit if not in person".

Mikal Gilmore of Rolling Stone describes Harrison's "If Not for You" as "surprisingly beautiful", while Leng deems it a "gleaming pop creation". In his entry for All Things Must Pass in the book 1,000 Recordings to Hear Before You Die, Tom Moon names it as one of the album's three "key tracks", along with "Beware of Darkness" and "Isn't It a Pity".

=== Live performances ===
Harrison and Dylan rehearsing the song before the Concert for Bangladesh

Dylan and Harrison duetted on "If Not for You" during the soundcheck for the 1971 Concert for Bangladesh shows at Madison Square Garden in New York. The rehearsal took place on July 31, the day before the concerts; for Harrison, it was the first indication that Dylan had committed to performing at the event after days of deliberation. Harrison's notes for a possible set list include the song, along with "Watching the River Flow" and "Blowin' in the Wind", although only the last of these was performed by Dylan at the two benefit concerts that day. A portion of their rehearsal of "If Not for You" appeared early in the 1972 documentary film The Concert for Bangladesh. The full performance was released on the 2005 remastered DVD.

Leng describes the rehearsal footage as "remarkable" and, in light of Harrison's disdain for the limelight and Dylan's reluctance to return to it, "an intimate glimpse of the warm friendship between two major cultural figures at a point when both were emotionally vulnerable". Leng adds: "They don't hit every note precisely or even remember every line, but they are evidently relishing each other's company." (Note: The Concert for Bangladesh was Harrison's first live performance as a headlining artist since the Beatles retired from touring in 1966. Former Apple employee Chris O'Dell recalls that journalist Al Aronowitz, a mutual friend of Harrison and Dylan, was confident that Dylan would show up for the rehearsal, since "Bob would never let George down." Such was the relief when Dylan arrived soon afterward, according to O'Dell, "It was as if the Lord Himself had floated down from the heavens ... we watched George walk across the stage to give Bob a hug. That was a moment, I'll tell you.") In his 2005 review for Rolling Stone, David Fricke welcomed the DVD release as a reminder of how Harrison "invented the superstar benefit concert" by enlisting friends such as Dylan, Eric Clapton, Ringo Starr and Billy Preston, and he said of the "If Not for You" rehearsal: "they spend the entire song looking at each other, as if they're singing about their own relationship." Jack Whatley of Far Out Magazine similarly views it as a document of "one of the more touching friendships to come out of the sixties", and comments on the "sense of care that Harrison affords his friend ... A few subtle glances, some shared moments and some body language cues show that their relationship went on far beyond their musical inclinations."

Harrison performed "If Not for You" live, again at Madison Square Garden, in October 1992 during the all-star concert celebrating Dylan's first three decades as a recording artist. Backed by Booker T. & the M.G.'s and other musicians including G. E. Smith on slide guitar, Harrison performed "startling versions" of "If Not for You" and "Absolutely Sweet Marie", according to Gilmore, although only the latter was included on the 30th Anniversary Concert Celebration live album. The concert was Harrison's last major live performance.

=== Personnel ===
According to Simon Leng (except where noted), the musicians who performed on Harrison's studio version of the song are as follows:

- George Harrison – vocals, acoustic guitars, Dobros, harmonica
- Peter Frampton – acoustic guitar
- Gary Wright – piano
- Billy Preston – organ
- uncredited – harmonium
- Klaus Voormann – bass
- Alan White – drums
- Ringo Starr – tambourine

== Olivia Newton-John version ==
"If Not for You"
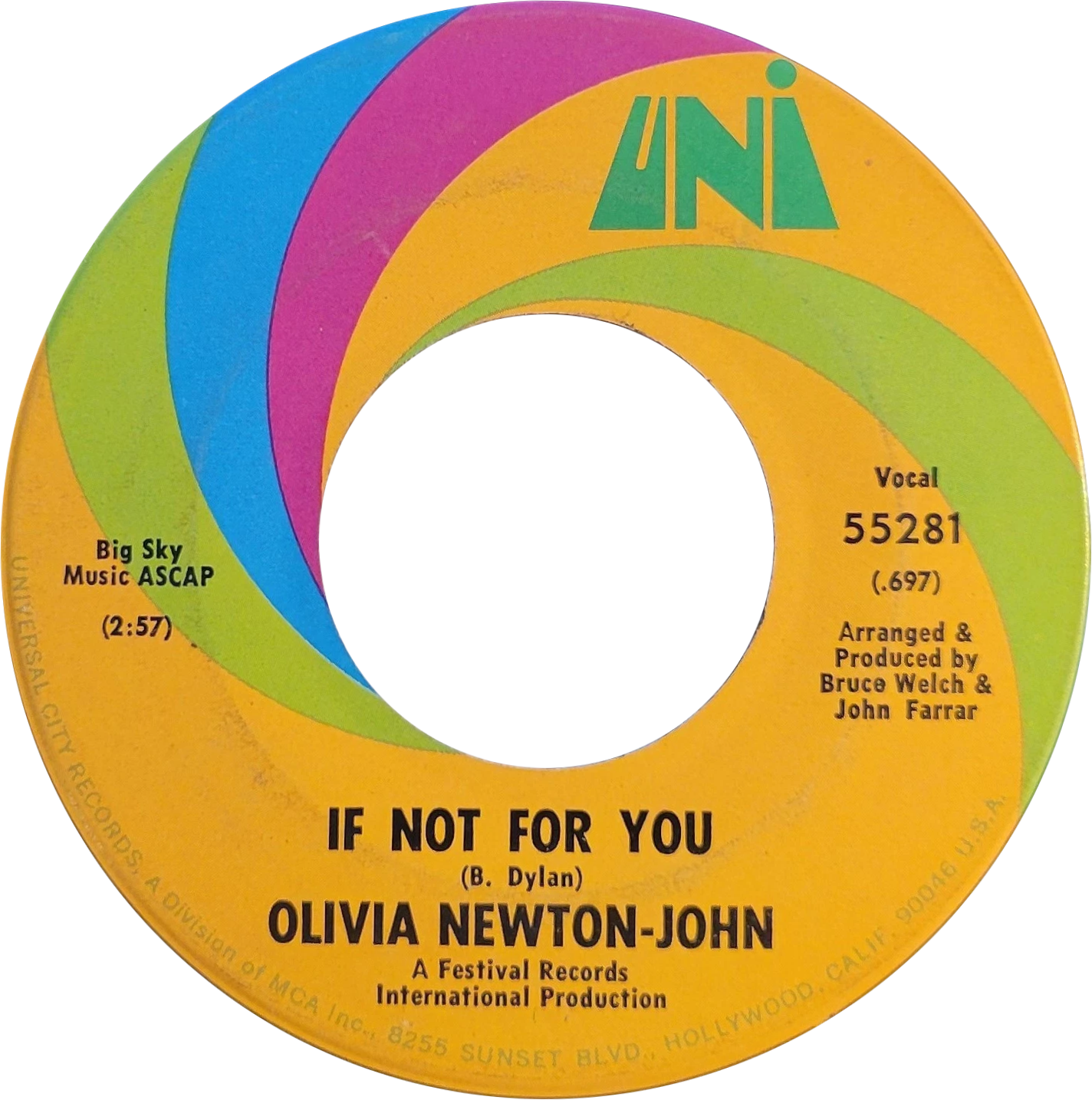
- US single of the Olivia Newton-John recording

Single by Olivia Newton-John

from the album If Not for You
- B-side: "The Biggest Clown"
- Released: March 1971
- Recorded: 1971
- Genre: Country pop
- Length: 2:57
- Label: Uni, Pye International
- Songwriter: Bob Dylan
- Producers: Bruce Welch, John Farrar

Olivia Newton-John singles chronology
"Till You Say You'll Be Mine" (1966)	"If Not for You" (1971)	"Banks of the Ohio" (1971)

Audio
- "If Not for You" by Olivia Newton-John on YouTube

In 1971, singer Olivia Newton-John recorded "If Not for You" on the suggestion of her manager after he had heard Harrison's treatment of the song despite her reservation that it was not "her type of song". The producers John Farrar and Bruce Welch arranged the song closer to Harrison's version than to Dylan's, with the slide guitar used in Harrison's version featuring prominently. She released "If Not for You" as her first international single, after appearances on Cliff Richard's concert tour and the TV show It's Cliff Richard. Marking the start of her 1970s country pop period, her recording was one of many examples of middle-of-the-road artists covering tracks from All Things Must Pass. Music historian Dave Thompson describes Newton-John's version as "superb" and, citing her readiness to acknowledge Harrison's influence, says that Dylan "never truly got to grips with what remains one of his most affecting love songs".

The single enjoyed considerable international success, peaking at number 7 in the UK and number 25 on the Billboard Hot 100 in the US. It also spent three weeks at number 1 on Billboard's Easy Listening chart. The song was subsequently issued as the title track of Newton-John's debut album, If Not for You.

=== Chart performance ===
==== Weekly charts ====
Chart (1971)	Peak position
Australian Go-Set National Top 60	14
Belgian BRT Top 30	29
Canadian RPM 100 Singles	18
Canadian RPM Adult Contemporary	11
Irish Singles Chart	6
Israel (Israeli Singles Chart)	15
New Zealand Listener Chart	8
Norwegian VG-lista Singles	6
South African Springbok Singles	1
UK Singles Chart	7
US Billboard Hot 100	25
US Billboard Easy Listening	1
US Cash Box Top 100	23
Quebec (ADISQ)	30

==== Year-end charts ====
Chart (1971)	Rank
US Billboard	76
South African Springbok Singles	13

== Other cover versions ==
Numerous other artists have covered "If Not for You". These include Rod Stewart, Bryan Ferry, Richie Havens, Sarah Vaughan, Glen Campbell, Barb Jungr, Katie Buckhaven, Susan McKeown, Phil Keaggy, Ed Kuepper, and the Flatmates.
