= John Farrar =

Australian musician and record producer (born 1946)

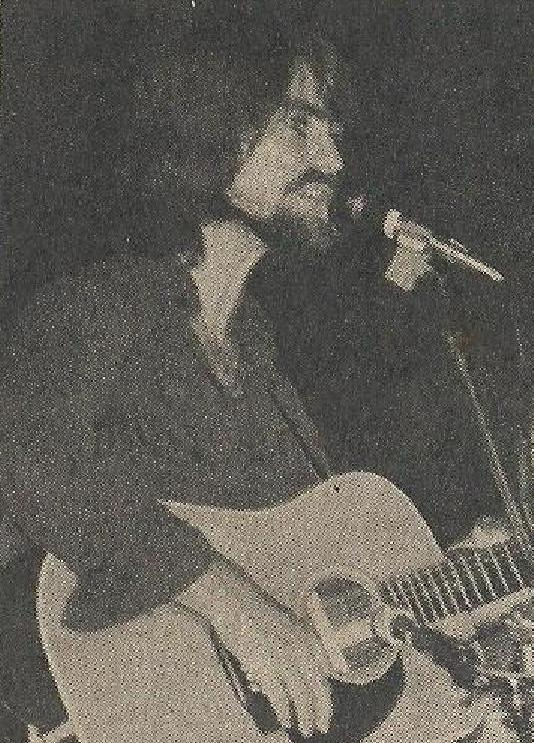
- Farrar performing in 1972
- Born: John Clifford Farrar; 8 November 1946 (age 79); Melbourne, Victoria, Australia
- Spouse: Pat Carroll (m. 1969)
- Children: 2; including Sam
- Musical career
- Genres: Rock and roll, pop
- Occupations: Singer-songwriter; guitarist; music producer; arranger
- Instruments: Vocals; guitar; bass; keyboards
- Years active: 1961–present
- Labels: CBS, See4Miles
- Formerly of: The Jaguars; The Mustangs; The Strangers; Marvin, Welch & Farrar; The Shadows

John Clifford Farrar (/ˈfɑːrər/ FAR-ər; born 8 November 1946) is an Australian music producer, songwriter, arranger, singer, and guitarist. As a musician, Farrar is a former member of several rock and roll groups including The Mustangs (1963–1964), The Strangers (1964–1970), Marvin, Welch & Farrar (1970–1973), and The Shadows (1973–1976). In 1980, he released a solo eponymous album. As a songwriter and producer, he worked with Olivia Newton-John from 1971 to 1989. He wrote her U.S. number-one hit singles: "Have You Never Been Mellow" (1975), "You're the One That I Want" (1978 duet with John Travolta), and "Magic" (1980). He also produced the majority of her recorded material during that time, including her number-one albums, If You Love Me, Let Me Know (1974), Have You Never Been Mellow (1975), and her landmark studio album Physical (1981). He was a co-producer of the soundtracks for the films Grease (1978) and Xanadu (1980).

Farrar also produced Newton-John's first American number-one hit single, "I Honestly Love You", which was awarded the Grammy Award for Record of the Year in 1975. In 1969, Farrar married the Australian singer Pat Carroll, who had been Newton-John's singing partner. In July 1970, Farrar and Carroll relocated to the United Kingdom and, since late 1975, they have resided in the United States. They are the parents of Sam Farrar, bassist of Phantom Planet and Maroon 5, and Max Farrar, a composer and producer whose work includes songs with Lewis Capaldi and The Script.

== Early life ==
John Clifford Farrar was born on 8 November 1946, and grew up in Moonee Ponds, a suburb of Melbourne. He has an older brother, Reginald, and the family lived in a large household with aunts and uncles. Farrar's mother bought him a country music guitar, which he began playing at the age of twelve.

== Early career ==
In 1961, he started playing in a band, The Jaguars, with his older brother Reg. When he was fifteen, the family relocated to nearby Niddrie. In 1963, he joined The Mustangs, alongside Johnny Cooper on vocals, Peter Ramis on bass guitar and Billy on drums.

== The Strangers ==
In late January 1964, he joined The Strangers, replacing the founding guitarist Laurie Arthur, adding another lead vocalist to the group. Other members were Peter Robinson on bass guitar and lead vocals, Graeme Thompson on drums, and Fred Weiland on guitar and backing vocals. They had formed as an instrumental band in Glenroy in 1961, working in the Melbourne dance scene. In June 1964, the band issued its first vocal single, "If You Gotta Make a Fool of Someone", which reached the top 30 on the Melbourne charts in July. They became a popular backing and session band.

In August 1964, The Strangers were hired as the house band for the ATV O pop music program, The Go!! Show. Both Farrar's future wife, Pat Carroll, and their close friend, Olivia Newton-John, appeared on The Go!! Show as singers backed by The Strangers. Carroll and Newton-John formed a vocal duo, "Pat and Olivia", and in 1967, they first toured the United Kingdom, including a gig at the infamous Raymond Revuebar club in Soho.

After returning to Australia from a tour, Carroll could no longer work in the UK because her work visa had expired, while Newton-John, who was a British citizen, returned to work in the UK. Farrar dated and married Carroll and, following their wedding in 1970, Carroll stopped pursuing headliner status. She occasionally reprised the duo with Newton-John, and worked as a session singer on Farrar's or Newton-John's work. During 1968, The Strangers supported the Australian leg of a tour by the British instrumental group, The Shadows. In June 1970, The Strangers released their most successful hit, "Melanie Makes Me Smile", which peaked at No. 14 on the Go-Set National Top 60 in August.

Farrar left the Strangers in July 1970.

== Marvin, Welch & Farrar/The Shadows ==
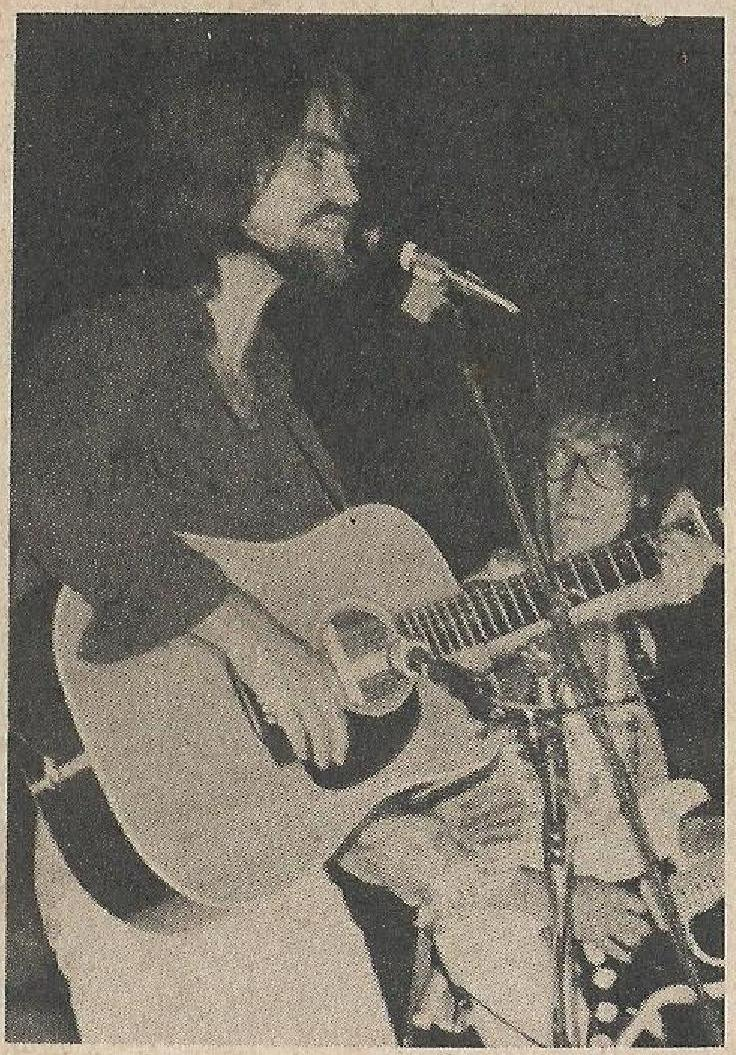
Farrar (left) and Hank Marvin (right) performing with Marvin, Welch & Farrar in 1972

In July 1970, Farrar left The Strangers, and he and Carroll moved to Britain, where he was invited to become a member of Marvin, Welch & Farrar, a vocal harmony group featuring two former members of The Shadows, Hank Marvin and Bruce Welch. By that time, Newton-John and Welch were engaged, and Farrar and Welch became two of her songwriters and producers. Welch and Farrar co-produced and performed on Newton-John's cover of Bob Dylan's track, "If Not for You", and the album of the same title, released in November 1971.

Farrar also worked as a backing guitarist and vocalist with Cliff Richard. Marvin, Welch & Farrar put out two albums, an eponymous one in 1971, and Second Opinion (in both quadraphonic and stereo formats) in 1972. In 1973, a third album featured just Marvin and Farrar. The Shadows reformed soon after, and Farrar joined as second lead guitarist and vocalist. In 1975, the group represented the UK in the Eurovision Song Contest with "Let Me Be the One". In 1973, Farrar had appeared in the same contest as a backing guitarist and vocalist for Richard's entry, "Power to All Our Friends". The following year he backed and produced Newton-John on her effort, "Long Live Love".

From 1971 to 1976, various members of The Shadows were employed as session musicians for Newton-John's early albums, recorded at London's Abbey Road Studios. Aside from Farrar and Welch, they included Brian Bennett, Alan Hawkshaw, Alan Tarney, Dave Richmond, and Trevor Spencer. Some other session musicians were the fellow Australians Kevin Peek and Terry Britten, who had both worked with Richard, and some other musicians. They worked under co-producers Farrar and Welch until midway through Newton-John's second album, Olivia. Thereafter, Farrar was her main producer. He produced her number-one albums, If You Love Me, Let Me Know (1974), Have You Never Been Mellow (1975), and Olivia's Greatest Hits Vol. 2 (1982). Farrar also produced Newton-John's first American number-one hit single, "I Honestly Love You", which was awarded the Grammy Award for Record of the Year in 1975. His last production for Newton-John was her album, Warm and Tender in 1989.

== Other works ==
In 1974, Farrar used the talk box on an instrumental track, "No, No, Nina". The device, which was based on effects devices that were first developed in the late 1930s, had been used by Joe Walsh on the 1973 US Top 40 single "Rocky Mountain Way". In 1976, Peter Frampton released two Top 10 US singles from the Frampton Comes Alive! album that used the talk box as well. Farrar's talk box track was held back from release by EMI until 1997, when it appeared on the CD album, The Shadows at Abbey Road, containing mostly unreleased material. A vocal version of "No, No, Nina" appeared on the Specs Appeal album as a Eurovision contender track, but it was voted sixth out of six initial entries. Aside from instrumentation and vocals, Farrar worked as an arranger on The Shadows' albums: Rockin' with Curly Leads, Specs Appeal, Tasty and Live at the Paris Olympia.

Farrar's work with Newton-John embraced a wide range of styles, from "You're the One That I Want" (duet with John Travolta) to "Physical". Farrar's biggest success with Newton-John as a writer-producer came with the film version of the musical, Grease. In 1977, during filming, its producers were replacing some of Jim Jacobs and Warren Casey's pieces from the original score and wanted some more commercial songs, including a solo number for Newton-John, so Farrar wrote and submitted two originals, "Hopelessly Devoted To You" and "You're the One That I Want". Both were accepted, despite strong reservations from director Randal Kleiser, who believed that the songs didn't fit the style, and became two of the soundtrack's most successful singles, being international number-one hits during 1978.

In June 2004, Farrar recalled writing the two songs: "'You're the One That I Want': The weird thing was it was the fastest song I ever wrote. It came so fast, the actual melody and the feel of it. 'Hopelessly Devoted To You': I spent the longest period writing the lyrics of any song I've ever written. Every thesaurus and every rhyming dictionary I had, just trying to really make it work properly". Other number-one hits for Newton-John that were written and produced by Farrar are "Have You Never Been Mellow" (1975), "Don't Stop Believin'" (an easy-listening chart-topper from 1976, not the Journey song of the same name), and "Magic" (1980). Farrar produced one side of the Xanadu soundtrack for the 1980 film of the same name. The other side featured tracks by Electric Light Orchestra and was produced by their guitarist-vocalist, Jeff Lynne. In March 1981, Farrar was nominated for a Golden Raspberry Award for Worst Original Song for the song "Suspended in Time" from Xanadu.

In 1995, Farrar collaborated with Newton-John and lyricist Tim Rice on the score of Cliff Richard's musical, Heathcliff based on the Emily Brontë novel Wuthering Heights. Farrar also co-wrote songs for a musical based on the 1959 film, Gidget, which, as of April 2012, had been indefinitely postponed. Farrar runs the Moonee Ponds Studio at Sweetwater Road in Malibu.

== Personal life ==
Farrar and Carroll are the parents of Phantom Planet and Maroon 5 bass guitarist Sam Farrar (born 29 June 1978), and Max Farrar, composer and music producer. Farrar is the father-in-law of former Agent Sparks member Stephanie Eitel, who is married to Sam. As of April 2012, Farrar and Carroll reside in Malibu, California.

== Instruments ==
According to AllMusic John Farrar has been credited with: vocals (lead, backing), guitars (lead, rhythm, bass guitar, acoustic, slide guitar, acoustic slide, electric slide), piano (electric), keyboards, mellotron, synthesizer, vocoder, synclavier, mandolin, and horn.

== Discography ==
As a performer

Solo singles

- "With Rainine on My Mind" (1971) – AUS #90
- "Reckless" (1981) - #138 Record World singles chart
- "Cheatin' His Heart Out Again" (1982) - #140 Record World singles chart

Solo album

- John Farrar – LP/CD – CBS/See4Miles (November 1980)

The Strangers

Main article: The Strangers (Australian band) § Discography

Marvin, Welch & Farrar

Main article: Marvin, Welch & Farrar § Discography (MW&F)

The Shadows

Main article: The Shadows discography

As a songwriter

With Olivia Newton-John

- 1971 "Round and Round"
- 1972 "My Old Man's Got a Gun"
- 1972 "I'm a Small and Lonely Light"
- 1973 "Maybe Then I'll Think of You"
- 1973 "Brotherly Love"
- 1973 "Music Makes My Day"
- 1974 "Home Ain't Home Anymore"
- 1975 "Have You Never Been Mellow"
- 1975 "It's So Easy"
- 1975 "Something Better to Do"
- 1975 "Sail into Tomorrow"
- 1976 "It'll Be Me" (also included on Farrar's 1980 solo album)
- 1976 "Small Talk and Pride"
- 1976 "Don't Stop Believin'"
- 1976 "Sam"
- 1976 "Compassionate Man"
- 1976 "Love You Hold the Key" (co-written with Olivia Newton-John)
- 1977 "Coolin' Down"
- 1978 "Hopelessly Devoted To You"
- 1978 "You're The One That I Want" (with John Travolta)
- 1978 "A Little More Love"
- 1978 "Totally Hot"
- 1978 "Never Enough"
- 1980 "Magic"
- 1980 "Suddenly" (with Cliff Richard)
- 1980 "Dancin'"
- 1980 "Suspended in Time"
- 1980 "Whenever You're Away from Me"
- 1980 "Fool Country"
- 1981 "Make a Move on Me"
- 1981 "Landslide"
- 1981 "Stranger's Touch"
- 1981 "Falling" (also included on Farrar's 1980 solo album)
- 1981 "Recovery" (also included on Farrar's 1980 solo album)
- 1982 "Tied Up"
- 1985 "Queen of the Publication"
- 1985 "Emotional Tangle"
- 1985 "Overnight Observation"
- 1985 "You Were Great, How Was I?"
- 1989 "Warm and Tender"
- 1990 "What If"
- 1990 "So Strange"
- 1995 "Had to Be"
- 1998 "Closer to Me"
- 1998 "Under My Skin"
- 2008 "Reckless" (also included on Farrar's 1980 solo album)
- 2012 "Weightless"
- 2012 "I Think You Might Like It"

As a producer

With Olivia Newton-John

- 1971 "If Not for You" (co-produced with Bruce Welch)
- 1972 "Olivia" (co-produced with Welch)
- 1973 "Let Me Be There" (co-produced with Welch)
- 1974 "Long Live Love" (co-produced with Welch)
- 1974 "If You Love Me, Let Me Know"
- 1975 "Have You Never Been Mellow"
- 1975 "Clearly Love"
- 1976 "Don't Stop Believin'"
- 1977 "Making a Good Thing Better"
- 1978 "Grease"
- 1978 "Totally Hot"
- 1978 "Xanadu"
- 1981 "Physical"
- 1981 "Love Performance"
- 1982 "Olivia's Greatest Hits Vol. 2" (new tracks)
- 1985 "Soul Kiss"
- 1989 "Warm and Tender"
- 1992 "Back to Basics: The Essential Collection 1971–1992" (one new track)
- 1998 "Back with a Heart"
- 2008 "A Celebration in Song" (one track)
- 2012 "This Christmas" (one track)

Other songwriting / production credits

- Neil Sedaka – "Workin' on a Groovy Thing" (1969) (arranger)
- Normie Rowe - "Hello" (1970)
- John Williamson - "John Williamson" (arranger)
- Liv Maessen - "Knock, Knock Who's There?" (1970)
- Lionel Rose - "I Thank You" (1970) (arranger)
- Cilla Black – "Thank Heavens I've Got You" (1973)
- Barry Crocker - "Susie Darlin'" (1973)
- The Mixtures - "Dazzle Easy, Diane" (1973)
- Labi Siffre - "For the Children (1973) (guitar and vocals)
- Pat Farrar – "Curly Headed Rooster" (1974)
- Cliff Richard – "It's Only Me You've Left Behind" (1975)
- Bill and Boyd - "Bill And Boyd" (1975)
- The Seekers - "Giving and Taking" (1976)
- The Osmonds – "It'll Be Me" (1976)
- Peter Doyle – "Skin Deep" (1977)
- John Travolta – "Sandy" (1978)
- Ian Mason – "Nobody Takes Me Seriously" (1978)
- The Moirs – "State of Shock" (1978)
- Karen Carpenter – "Remember When Lovin' Took All Night" (1980)
- Cher – "I Paralyze" (1982) (co-produced with David Wolpert)
- Tom Snow – "I Think I Know Too Much" (1982)
- Cliff Richard – "Galadriel (Spirit of Starlight)" (1983)
- Irene Cara – "Carasmatic" (1987)
- Jack Wagner – "Don't Give Up Your Day Job" (1987)
- Cliff Richard – Songs from Heathcliff (1995)
- Jimmy Buffett - "License to Chill" (2004)
- Delta Goodrem - "Delta" (2007) (guitar)

== Eurovision Song Contest appearances ==
- 1973 "Power to all Our Friends" (backing Cliff Richard).
- 1974 "Long Live Love" (producer to Olivia Newton-John)
- 1975 "Let Me Be the One" (member of The Shadows).
