= Olivia Newton-John albums discography =

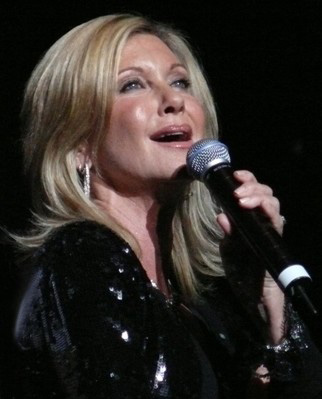
- Newton-John performing in 2008 at the State Theatre, Sydney, Australia
- Studio albums: 26
- Soundtrack albums: 6
- Live albums: 6
- Compilation albums: 14
- Singles: 70
- Box sets: 2
- Special releases: 4

The albums discography of English and Australian singer Olivia Newton-John consists of twenty-six studio albums, six live albums, fourteen compilations and six soundtracks. According to Billboard, Newton-John is the 44th most successful artist of all time. She is also listed as the 36th top female artist on the Billboard 200 all-time female list. To date, she has sold an estimated 100 million records worldwide, making her one of the world's best-selling artists of all time.

"Physical" was crowned as the Song of the Decade by Billboard, which also spent 10 weeks atop the Hot 100. According to the RIAA, Newton-John has sold 27 million certified albums and singles in the United States. She has amassed five number-one and ten other top-ten Hot 100 singles, and two number-one Billboard 200 solo albums. She starred in Grease, which featured one of the most successful soundtracks in Hollywood history.

== Studio albums ==
Title	Album details	Peak chart positions										Sales	Certifications
Title	Album details	AUS	CAN	GER	JPN	NL	NOR	NZ	SWE	UK	US	Sales	Certifications
If Not for You	Release: 1 November 1971; Format: LP, CD, cassette, digital download; Label: Festival / UNI	14	—	—	—	—	—	—	—	—	158		AUS: Gold
Olivia	Release: 11 August 1972; Format: LP, CD, cassette, digital download; Label: Festival	—	—	—	—	—	—	—	—	—	—		
Let Me Be There (international title) Music Makes My Day (UK title)	Release: 20 March 1973; Format: LP, CD, cassette, 8-track, digital download; Label: Festival / MCA	—	39	—	25	—	—	—	—	37	54	JPN: 89,130	MC: Platinum; RIAA: Gold; RIAJ: Gold
If You Love Me, Let Me Know	Release: 28 May 1974 (North America only); Format: LP, CD, cassette, 8-track; Label: MCA	—	1	—	—	—	—	—	—	—	1		MC: 2× Platinum; RIAA: Gold
Long Live Love	Release: 24 June 1974; Format: LP, CD, cassette, digital download; Label: EMI	19	—	—	—	—	—	—	—	40	—		AUS: Platinum
Have You Never Been Mellow	Release: 12 February 1975; Format: LP, CD, cassette, 8-track, digital download; Label: MCA	13	3	—	4	—	—	20	—	37	1	JPN: 169,380	MC: 2× Platinum; RIAA: Gold; RIAJ: Gold
Clearly Love	Release: 30 September 1975; Format: LP, CD, cassette, 8-track, digital download; Label: MCA	50	39	—	3	—	—	34	—	—	12	JPN: 110,450	MC: Platinum; RIAA: Gold; RIAJ: Gold
Come On Over	Release: March 1976; Format: LP, CD, cassette, 8-track, digital download; Label: MCA	29	30	—	2	—	—	12	—	49	13	JPN: 405,450	MC: Platinum; RIAA: Gold; RIAJ: Gold
Don't Stop Believin'	Release: October 1976; Format: LP, CD, cassette, 8-track, digital download; Label: MCA	88	56	—	3	—	—	—	—	—	33	JPN: 134,190	MC: Gold; RIAA: Gold
Making a Good Thing Better	Release: 3 November 1977; Format: LP, CD, cassette, 8-track, digital download; Label: MCA	71	33	—	3	—	—	—	—	60	34	JPN: 109,820	MC: Gold; RIAJ: Gold
Totally Hot	Release: 22 November 1978; Format: LP, CD, cassette, 8-track, digital download; Label: MCA	7	5	—	9	1	4	18	9	30	7	JPN: 47,280	BPI: Gold; MC: Platinum; RIAA: Platinum
Physical	Release: 13 October 1981; Format: LP, CD, cassette, 8-track, digital download; Label: MCA	3	3	30	5	9	8	8	3	11	6	JPN: 395,810	AUS: 3× Platinum; BPI: Gold; MC: 4× Platinum; RIAA: 2× Platinum; RMNZ: Gold
Soul Kiss	Release: 25 October 1985; Format: LP, CD, cassette, 8-track, digital download; Label: MCA	11	34	54	5	36	—	43	46	66	29	JPN: 67,090	MC: Gold; RIAA: Gold
The Rumour	Release: 2 August 1988; Format: LP, CD, cassette, digital download; Label: MCA	30	94	—	31	96	—	—	—	—	67	JPN: 19,340	
Warm and Tender	Release: October 1989; Format: LP, CD, cassette, digital download; Label: Geffen	109	—	—	43	—	—	—	—	—	124	JPN: 12,570	
Gaia: One Woman's Journey	Release: 26 July 1994; Format: CD, cassette, digital download; Label: Festival	7	—	—	—	—	—	—	—	33	—		ARIA: Gold
Back with a Heart	Release: 12 May 1998; Format: CD, cassette, digital download; Label: MCA	66	—	—	—	—	—	—	—	—	59		
'Tis the Season (with Vince Gill)	Release: 1 September 2000; Format: CD; Label: Hallmark	—	—	—	—	—	—	—	—	—	—		
(2)	Release: 12 November 2002; Format: CD; Label: Festival	5	—	—	—	—	—	—	—	—	—		ARIA: Platinum
Indigo: Women of Song	Release: 17 October 2004; Format: CD, digital download; Label: Festival	15	—	—	—	—	—	—	—	27	—		ARIA: Gold
Stronger Than Before	Release: 1 September 2005; Format: CD, digital download; Label: Warner	39	—	—	—	—	—	—	—	—	—		
Grace and Gratitude	Release: 25 August 2006; Format: CD, digital download; Label: EMI	86	—	—	—	—	—	—	—	—	—		
Christmas Wish	Release: 1 October 2007; Format: CD, digital download; Label: Warner	—	—	—	—	—	—	—	—	—	187	US: 22,000	
A Celebration in Song (Olivia Newton-John & Friends)	Release: 3 June 2008; Format: CD, digital download; Label: Warner	—	—	—	—	—	—	—	—	—	—		
This Christmas (with John Travolta)	Release: 9 November 2012; Format: CD, digital download; Label: Universal	33	—	—	—	—	—	—	—	—	81		
Liv On (with Amy Sky and Beth Nielsen Chapman)	Release: 7 October 2016; Format: CD, digital download; Label: Sony Music Australia	72	—	—	—	—	—	—	—	—	—		
Friends for Christmas (with John Farnham)	Release: 11 November 2016; Format: CD, digital download; Label: Sony Music Australia	1	—	—	—	—	—	—	—	—	—		ARIA: 2× Platinum
"—" denotes releases that did not chart or were not released in that territory.

== Soundtrack albums ==
Title	Album details	Peak chart positions										Sales	Certifications
Title	Album details	AUS	CAN	FRA	GER	JPN	NL	NOR	SWE	UK	US	Sales	Certifications
Grease (with John Travolta)	Release: 14 April 1978; Format: LP, CD, cassette, 8-track; Label: RSO, Polydor	1	1	3	1	1	1	1	1	1	1	JPN: 442,410; US: 14,000,000	ARIA: 14× Platinum; BPI: 9× Platinum; BVMI: 5× Gold; MC: Diamond; RIAA: 13× Platinum; SNEP: Platinum
Xanadu (with Electric Light Orchestra)	Release: 8 August 1980; Format: LP, CD, cassette, 8-track; Label: MCA	1	2	—	1	6	1	1	3	2	4	JPN: 312,150	ARIA: Platinum; BPI: Gold; BVMI: Gold; MC: 2× Platinum; RIAA: 2× Platinum
Two of a Kind (with John Travolta)	Release: 16 December 1983; Format: LP, CD, cassette, 8-track; Label: MCA	35	32	—	39	29	—	—	—	—	26	JPN: 85,120	RIAA: Platinum
Sordid Lives	Release: 11 May 2001; Format: CD, digital download; Label: Varèse Sarabande	—	—	—	—	—	—	—	—	—	—		
Sordid Lives: The Series	Release: 1 January 2008; Format: Digital download; Label: Varèse Sarabande	—	—	—	—	—	—	—	—	—	—		
A Few Best Men	Release: 20 January 2012; Format: CD, digital download; Label: Universal	—	—	—	—	—	—	—	—	—	—		
"—" denotes releases that did not chart or were not released in that territory.

== Live albums ==
Title	Album details	Peak chart positions		Sales	Certifications
Title	Album details	AUS	JPN	Sales	Certifications
Love Performance	Release: 1981; Format: LP, cassette; Label: EMI Japan	—	52	JPN: 13,420	
Highlights from The Main Event (with John Farnham and Anthony Warlow)	Release: 3 December 1998; Format: CD, cassette; Label: Festival	1	—		ARIA: 5× Platinum
One Woman's Live Journey	Release: 19 September 2000; Format: CD; Label: Festival	41	—		
Olivia's Live Hits	Release: 15 January 2008; Format: CD, digital download; Label: EMI	—	—		
Summer Nights: Live in Las Vegas	Release: 3 March 2015; Format: 2×CD, digital download; Label: ONJ Productions	—	—		
Two Strong Hearts Live (with John Farnham)	Release: 26 June 2015; Format: CD, digital download; Label: Sony Music Australia	1	—		ARIA: Gold; RMNZ: Gold
"—" denotes releases that did not chart or were not released in that territory.

== Compilation albums ==
Title	Album details	Peak chart positions										Sales	Certifications
Title	Album details	AUS	CAN	GER	JPN	NL	NOR	NZ	SWE	UK	US	Sales	Certifications
First Impressions	Release: late 1974 (outside of North America); Format: LP, CD, cassette; Label: Festival	3	—	—	—	—	—	2	—	—	—		ARIA: 5× Platinum
Crystal Lady	Release: 1976 (Asia only); Format: LP, CD, cassette; Label: EMI	—	—	—	16	—	—	—	—	—	—	JPN: 64,500	
Olivia Newton-John's Greatest Hits	Release: 1977; Format: LP, CD, cassette; Label: MCA	18	11	—	5	24	—	—	—	19	13	JPN: 163,810	ARIA: 2× Platinum; BPI: Gold; MC: Platinum; RIAA: 2× Platinum
Olivia's Greatest Hits Vol. 2	Release: 3 September 1982; Format: LP, CD, cassette; Label: MCA	1	6	—	12	—	—	10	—	—	16	JPN: 154,110	ARIA: Platinum; MC: 5× Platinum; RIAA: 2× Platinum; RMNZ: Platinum
Olivia's Greatest Hits	Release: 1982; Format: LP, cassette; Label: EMI	—	—	33	—	12	—	—	—	8	—		BPI: Platinum
Back to Basics: The Essential Collection 1971–1992	Release: 9 June 1992; Format: LP, CD, cassette; Label: Geffen	15	—	—	—	—	—	7	—	12	121		ARIA: Gold; RIAA: Gold
The Christmas Collection	Release: 30 October 2001; Format: CD; Label: Hip-O	—	—	—	—	—	—	—	—	—	—		
Magic: The Very Best of Olivia Newton-John	Release: 11 September 2001; Format: CD; Label: Universal	—	—	—	—	—	—	—	—	—	150	US: 173,000	
The Definitive Collection	Release: 2001; Format: CD, digital download; Label: Universal	—	—	—	13	—	18	—	—	11	—	JPN: 84,337	BPI: Gold; RIAJ: Gold
Gold	Release: 14 June 2005; Format: CD, digital download; Label: Hip-O	71	—	—	—	—	—	—	—	—	—		
40/40: The Best Selection	Release: 13 October 2010; Format: CD, digital download; Label: Universal	—	—	—	—	—	—	—	—	—	—		
Hopelessly Devoted: The Hits	Release: 8 June 2018; Format: CD, digital download; Label: Sony Music Australia	5	—	—	—	—	—	40	—	—	—		
Just the Two of Us: The Duets Collection (Vol. 1)	Release: 5 May 2023; Format: LP, CD, digital download; Label: Primary Wave	29	—	—	—	—	—	—	—	— (Note: Just the Two of Us: The Duets Collection (Vol. 1) did not enter the UK Album Chart but did peak at number 18 on the UK Album Sales Chart)	—		
Just the Two of Us: The Duets Collection (Vol. 2)	Release: 6 October 2023; Format: LP, CD, digital download; Label: Primary Wave	—	—	—	—	—	—	—	—	— (Note: Just the Two of Us: The Duets Collection (Vol. 2) did not enter the UK Album Chart but did peak at number 49 on the UK Album Sales Chart)	—		
Angels in the Snow	Release: 22 November 2024; Format: LP, CD, digital download; Label: Primary Wave	—	—	—	—	—	—	—	—	—	—		
"—" denotes releases that did not chart or were not released in that territory.

== Extended plays ==
Title	EP details
A Window to the Sky	Release: 1976; Format: LP; Label: EMI
4 Sucessos	Release: 1977; Format: LP; Label: EMI
Hotel Sessions	Release: 8 April 2014; Format: CD, digital download; Label: ONJ Productions

== Box sets ==
Title	Album details
Olivia Newton-John Box	Release: 3 December 1983; Format: LP; Label: Universal
40th Anniversary Collection	Release: 13 December 2010; Format: CD, digital download; Label: Universal

== Special releases ==
Title	Album details	Album details
Retrato	Release: 1981; Format: CD; Label: EMI	Compilation released only for radio broadcasters in Argentina.
The Christmas Angel: A Family Story	Release: 1998; Format: CD; Label: American Gramaphone	Non-musical project. Narration of a story between Mannheim Steamroller's songs.
Christmas Carols	Release: 2009; Format: CD; Label: Sunday Herald	Christmas album released only with the Christmas edition of Scottish newspaper Sunday Herald.
Icon	Release: 8 October 2013; Format: CD; Label: Geffen	Compilation released for the Icon series.

== See also ==
- Olivia Newton-John singles discography
- Olivia Newton-John videography
