= 40/40: The Best Selection =

40/40 The Best Selection

Compilation album by Olivia Newton-John
- Released: 13 October 2010
- Recorded: 1970–1998
- Label: UMG
- Producer: Various

Olivia Newton-John chronology
A Celebration in Song (2008)	40/40 The Best Selection (2010)	A Few Best Men (2012)

40/40 The Best Selection is a double compilation album by British-Australian singer Olivia Newton-John. It was released by Universal Music on 13 October 2010 in Japan, simultaneously with the box set 40th Anniversary Collection. The compilation was specially created for the Japanese market and was later remastered by Universal Music Japan and pressed on SHM-CD. The songs were selected by votes from Japanese fans for a limited release edition that includes a bonus track ("Come on Home"). 40/40 The Best Selection peaked at number 20 on the Japanese Albums Chart.

== Track listing ==
Disc 1

1. "Have You Never Been Mellow" from Have You Never Been Mellow
2. "Hopelessly Devoted to You" from Grease
3. "Sam" from Don't Stop Believin'
4. "Making a Good Thing Better" from Making a Good Thing Better
5. "Something Better to Do" from Clearly Love
6. "Don't Stop Believin'"from Don't Stop Believin'
7. "Sad Songs" from Don't Stop Believin'"
8. "Compassionate Man" from Don't Stop Believin'"
9. "Jolene" from Come On Over
10. "Please Mr. Please" from Have You Never Been Mellow
11. "Take Me Home, Country Roads" from Music Makes My Day
12. "Let It Shine" from Clearly Love
13. "If Not for You" from If Not for You
14. "Don't Throw It All Away" from Come On Over
15. "Let Me Be There" from Music Makes My Day
16. "Long Live Love" from Long Live Love
17. "If You Love Me (Let Me Know)" from If You Love Me, Let Me Know
18. "Angel Eyes" from Long Live Love
19. "The Promise (The Dolphin Song)" from Physical
20. "Summer Nights" from Grease

Disc 2

1. "Xanadu" from Xanadu
2. "Physical" from Physical
3. "You're the One That I Want" from Grease
4. "Heart Attack" from Physical
5. "Twist of Fate" from Two of a Kind (soundtrack)
6. "Landslide" from Physical
7. "I Need Love" from Back to Basics: The Essential Collection 1971–1992
8. "The Rumour" from The Rumour
9. "Totally Hot" from Totally Hot
10. "Make a Move on Me" from Physical
11. "Deeper Than the Night" from Totally Hot
12. "Magic" from Xanadu
13. "Soul Kiss" from Soul Kiss
14. "A Little More Love" from Totally Hot
15. "Suddenly" from Xanadu
16. "Take a Chance" from Two of a Kind (soundtrack)
17. "Come on Over" from Come On Over
18. "Slow Dancing" from Making a Good Thing Better
19. "Clearly Love" from Clearly Love
20. "I Honestly Love You" from Long Live Love
21. "Come on Home" (bonus track)

== Charts ==
Chart performance for 40/40: The Best Selection
Chart (2010)	Peak position
Japanese Albums (Oricon)	20

== Release history ==
Release history and formats for 40/40: The Best Selection
Region	Date	Format	Label	Ref.
Japan	13 October 2010	CD	UMG	
