= One Woman's Journey Tour =

1999 concert tour by Olivia Newton-John

- Tour by Olivia Newton-John
- Promotional poster for the tour
- Associated album: Back with a Heart
- Start date: 16 July 1999
- End date: 4 September 1999
- Legs: 1
- No. of shows: 30 in North America

Olivia Newton-John concert chronology
- Greatest Hits Tour (1998–99); One Woman's Journey Tour (1999); Millennium Tour (2000)

One Woman's Journey Tour was the eighth concert tour by Australian singer Olivia Newton-John. It promoted her seventeenth studio album, Back with a Heart. The tour was announced after the success of the Greatest Hits Tour, and had 30 dates across the United States.

== Background ==
The song "The Long and Winding Road" was performed as a tribute to Linda McCartney who died of breast cancer in 1998 (her husband, Paul, originally wrote the song for The Beatles). The songs "The Flower That Shattered the Stone" and "(They Long to Be) Close to You", are respectively tributes to the Columbine High School massacre victims and Olivia's deceased personal friend, Karen Carpenter (the song was made famous by the duo Carpenters).

The tour band was the same formed for the John Farnham tour shows (Newton-John performed with Farnham on their The Main Event Tour). Newton-John also talked about her battle against the breast cancer during the 1990s, which originated the names of this tour and her sixteenth studio album, Gaia: One Woman's Journey.

== Critical response ==
The One Woman's Journey Tour received generally positive feedback from critics. Lisa Jann from The Seattle Times wrote: "Sticking with signature songs and old favorites, the Aussie princess of '70s pop and Grease icon surprised with a fun song list that spanned the entirety of her career, her ever-pleasant charisma, and her sweet voice, which sounded as fresh as ever". Kevin C. Johnson from St. Louis Post-Dispatch commented that "[...] One of the better nostalgia tours to catch this summer is Olivia Newton-John's low-profile trek, which drew a crowd of respectable size to Riverport Amphitheatre on Saturday night". The Kansas City Star published a mixed review, writing: "The singer has taken her knocks, some of them well-deserved, for bland interpretations of some mindless pop melodies. If white bread could sing, the classic put-down goes, it would sound like Olivia Newton-John". Thomas Kintner from Hartford Courant stated that: "[The] most important to the two-hour, 27-song show was that none of it seemed dated, not its hardly-looking-50 star, not her still-clarion voice, and not its songs". John Curran from The Press of Atlantic City wrote: "In fact, 'nice' might be the only word to accurately describle Newton-John's two-hour performance Thursday night as she opened a two-night stand at Trump Taj Mahal Casino Resort. It was wholesome, it was earnest, it was nostalgic, it was inspirational, it was sugar-sweet".

== Opening act ==
- Jim Brickman (selected dates)

== Set list ==
1. "Xanadu"
2. "Magic"
3. "Don't Stop Believin'"
4. "Precious Love"
5. "Sam"
6. "Let Me Be There"
7. "Have You Never Been Mellow"
8. "If Not for You"
9. "Jolene"
10. "The Long and Winding Road"
11. "Take Me Home, Country Roads"
12. "The Flower That Shattered the Stone"
13. "Over the Rainbow"
14. "(They Long to Be) Close to You"
15. "Not Gonna Give Into It"
16. "Please Mr. Please"
17. "Don't Cry for Me Argentina"
18. "You're the One That I Want"
19. "Summer Nights"
20. "Hopelessly Devoted to You"
21. "Suddenly"
22. "Don't Cut Me Down"
23. "If You Love Me (Let Me Know)"
24. "Back with a Heart"
25. "Twist of Fate" (selected dates)
26. "Physical"
27. "I Honestly Love You"

== Broadcasts and recordings ==
The concerts audio of 26 and 27 August 1999, at Trump Taj Mahal, was recorded for a commercial release. One Woman's Live Journey is Newton-John third live album and was released in 2000, on CD and DVD-Audio. The album only charted in the Newton-John native country, Australia. The tourbook, titled as Olivia: One Woman's Journey features several pictures of Newton-John across the years, with personal comments by herself.

== Tour dates ==
Date	City	Country	Venue	Opening Act
North America
16 July 1999	Las Vegas	United States	Desert Grand Ballroom	N/A
17 July 1999	Las Vegas	United States	Desert Grand Ballroom	N/A
18 July 1999	Las Vegas	United States	Desert Grand Ballroom	N/A
20 July 1999	Albuquerque	United States	Tingley Coliseum	N/A
22 July 1999	San Diego	United States	Humphreys Concerts by the Bay	N/A
23 July 1999	Los Angeles	United States	Greek Theatre	N/A
24 July 1999	Oakville	United States	Mondavi Winery Concert Venue	N/A
26 July 1999	Saratoga	United States	Mountain Winery Amphitheater	N/A
28 July 1999	Eugene	United States	Silva Concert Hall	N/A
30 July 1999	Reno	United States	Grande Exposition Hall	N/A
31 July 1999	Reno	United States	Grande Exposition Hall	N/A
1 August 1999^{[a]}	Paso Robles	United States	Mid-State Fair Main Grandstand	N/A
4 August 1999	Portland	United States	Arlene Schnitzer Concert Hall	N/A
6 August 1999	Spokane	United States	Spokane Opera House	N/A
7 August 1999	Seattle	United States	Benaroya Hall	N/A
12 August 1999	Columbus	United States	Polaris Amphitheater	Jim Brickman
14 August 1999	Maryland Heights	United States	Riverport Amphitheater	Jim Brickman
15 August 1999	Bonner Springs	United States	Sandstone Amphitheater	Jim Brickman
17 August 1999	Noblesville	United States	Deer Creek Music Center	Jim Brickman
19 August 1999	Boston	United States	Harbor Lights Pavilion	N/A
20 August 1999	Wallingford	United States	Oakdale Theatre	Jim Brickman
21 August 1999	Hopewell	United States	Finger Lakes Performing Arts Center	Jim Brickman
25 August 1999	Westbury	United States	Westbury Music Fair	N/A
26 August 1999	Atlantic City	United States	Etess Arena	N/A
27 August 1999	Atlantic City	United States	Etess Arena	N/A
30 August 1999	Uncasville	United States	Mohegan Sun Events Center	N/A
1 September 1999	Clarkston	United States	Pine Knob Music Theatre	N/A
2 September 1999	Grand Rapids	United States	Van Andel Arena	N/A
3 September 1999	Chicago	United States	Chicago Theatre	N/A
4 September 1999	Milwaukee	United States	Riverside Theater	N/A

Festivals and other miscellaneous performances

a This concert was a part of the California Mid-States Fair.

== Personnel ==
- Olivia Newton-John – vocals
- Lindsay Field – backing vocals
- Lisa Edwards – backing vocals
- Angus Burchall – drums
- Joe Creighton – bass, backing vocals
- Stuart Fraiser – guitar
- Steve Williams – saxophone, harmonica
