= The Definitive Collection (Olivia Newton-John album) =

Greatest hits album by Olivia Newton-John
- Released: 2001 (Europe 2002)
- Genre: Pop
- Length: 78:49
- Label: Universal Music

Olivia Newton-John chronology
Magic: The Very Best of Olivia Newton-John (2001)	The Definitive Collection (2001)	2 (2002)

The Definitive Collection is a greatest hits album by British-Australian singer and actress Olivia Newton-John. It was released outside of North America in 2001 by BMG Records and features 22 tracks, all of which had been released as singles.

== Track listing ==
=== Standard version ===
No.	Title	Writer(s)	Original album	Length
1.	"You're the One That I Want" (with John Travolta)	John Farrar	Grease (soundtrack), 1978	2:51
2.	"Xanadu" (with Electric Light Orchestra)	Jeff Lynne	Xanadu (soundtrack), 1980	3:29
3.	"Magic"	Farrar	Xanadu (soundtrack)	4:33
4.	"Sam"	Farrar; Don Black; Hank Marvin	Don't Stop Believin', 1976	3:45
5.	"I Honestly Love You"	Peter Allen; Jeff Barry	Long Live Love, 1974	3:40
6.	"Hopelessly Devoted to You"	Farrar	Grease (soundtrack)	3:09
7.	"Suddenly" (with Cliff Richard)	Farrar	Xanadu (soundtrack)	4:02
8.	"I Need Love"	Steve Kipner; John Lewis Parker	Back to Basics: The Essential Collection 1971–1992, 1992	4:14
9.	"A Little More Love"	Farrar	Totally Hot, 1978	3:30
10.	"Summer Nights" (with John Travolta)	Jim Jacobs; Warren Casey	Grease (soundtrack)	3:38
11.	"Physical"	Kipner; Terry Shaddick	Physical, 1981	3:45
12.	"What Is Life"	Farrar; Bruce Welch	Olivia, 1972	3:23
13.	"Heart Attack"	Kipner; Paul Bliss	Olivia's Greatest Hits Vol. 2, 1982	3:07
14.	"Landslide"	Farrar	Physical	4:24
15.	"Make a Move on Me"	Farrar; Tom Snow	Physical	3:19
16.	"Have You Never Been Mellow"	Farrar	Have You Never Been Mellow, 1975	3:33
17.	"Deeper Than the Night"	Snow; Johnny Vastano	Totally Hot	3:41
18.	"Banks of the Ohio"	Farrar; Welch	If Not for You, 1971	3:19
19.	"Take Me Home, Country Roads"	Bill Danoff; Taffy Nivert; John Denver	Let Me Be There, 1973	3:22
20.	"Long Live Love"	Valerie Avon; Harold Spiro	Long Live Love	2:50
21.	"If Not For You"	Bob Dylan	If Not for You	2:56
22.	"The Grease Megamix" (with John Travolta)	Farrar; Jacobs; Casey	non-album single, 1990	4:51

=== Japanese version ===
("Make a Move on Me" replaced by "Jolene")

1. "Have You Never Been Mellow"
2. "Xanadu"
3. "Physical"
4. "I Honestly Love You"
5. "Jolene" (writer: Dolly Parton) from Come On Over, 1976
6. "Magic"
7. "You're the One That I Want" (with John Travolta)
8. "Sam"
9. "Take Me Home, Country Roads"
10. "If Not for You"
11. "Hopelessly Devoted to You"
12. "Suddenly" (with Cliff Richard)
13. "I Need Love"
14. "Summer Nights" (with John Travolta)
15. "Heart Attack"
16. "Landslide"
17. "A Little More Love"
18. "What Is Life"
19. "Deeper Than the Night"
20. "Banks of the Ohio"
21. "Long Live Love"
22. "Grease Megamix" (with John Travolta)

== Charts ==
=== Weekly charts ===
Chart (2002–2007)	Peak position
Danish Albums (Hitlisten)	18
French Albums (SNEP)	37
Japanese Albums (Oricon)	191
Norwegian Albums (VG-lista)	18
Scottish Albums (OCC)	8
UK Albums (OCC)	11

=== Year-end charts ===
Chart (2004)	Position
UK Albums (OCC)	106

== Certifications ==
Region	Certification	Certified units/sales
United Kingdom (BPI)	Gold	100,000^{^}
^{^} Shipments figures based on certification alone.
