= A Summer Night with Olivia Newton-John =

2012–13 concert tour by Olivia Newton-John

- Tour by Olivia Newton-John
- Promotional poster for tour
- Associated album: A Few Best Men
- Start date: 24 February 2012
- End date: 17 March 2013
- Legs: 7
- No. of shows: 7 in Australia; 8 in Asia; 38 in North America; 6 in Europe; 59 in total

Olivia Newton-John concert chronology
- 2011 United States Tour (2011); A Summer Night with Olivia Newton-John (2012–13); Summer Nights (2014)

A Summer Night with Olivia Newton-John was the eighteenth concert tour by Australian singer Olivia Newton-John, in support of her sixth soundtrack A Few Best Men. The tour name drifts from her 1978 hit, "Summer Nights", from the musical film Grease. It is Newton-John largest tour since the Heartstrings World Tour, which runs from 2002 to 2005. It was her first tour in the United Kingdom in over 30 years.

It was followed by a concert tour of similar name, Summer Nights, which is mostly a residency show.

== Background and development ==
The tour first leg began in February in Australia, where Newton-John did seven concerts (two added by popular demand). The West Australian Symphony Orchestra participated to the Perth concerts, Melbourne Pops Orchestra to the Melbourne concerts and the Sydney Symphony Orchestra to the Sydney concerts.

A new medley with some songs from A Few Best Men was added to the setlist. Newton-John also performed on a few dates of her Australian leg the Australian Bicentenary song, "It's Always Australia for Me", from the 1988 album, The Rumour.

Olivia also did an interview by David Campbell to Australian talk show Morning about the concerts and her long career. She and Campbell sang "You're the One That I Want" at a Sydney concert. In Asia, she received extensive exposure by local media and was interviewed to newspapers such as Jakarta Globe, Bangkok Post and The Philippine Star.

The tour North American leg began in August, with a concert at Northalsted Market Days. The medley from A Few Best Men was removed, but "Weightless" continued in the setlist. A new medley with three old ballads by Newton-John was added; it consists of "Suspended in Time" (from Xanadu soundtrack), "Boats Against the Current" (from Totally Hot album) and "Shaking You" (from Two of a Kind soundtrack). The two later were performed for the first time by Olivia. The 2013 setlists doesn't have any songs from A Few Best Men soundtrack, and the ballads medley was withdrawn (only "Suspended in Time" was performed at North American concerts). United Kingdom concerts had a new medley added recalling Newton-John's participation on Eurovision Song Contest 1974, consisted of "Long Live Love" (UK's entrant to that year contest), "Angel Eyes" (another choice to represent the UK) and a cover of "Waterloo" (1974 Eurovision winner by Swedish group ABBA).

== Critical response ==
Ross McRae, from the newspaper The West Australian did a positive review to the first Perth concert, saying that Newton-John "led the enthusiastic crowd through a journey of her extensive 40-year career", but stated the medley of A Few Best Men "seemed misguided and unnecessary". Kittipong Thavevong from The Nation made a mixed review to the Bangkok show, writing: "Those who expected her to perform with the same voice quality as in her heyday left feeling disappointed. But those who simply wanted to a long-time favourite singer perform live were more than satisfied".

About her Singapure concert, Christopher Toh, from Today gave a rave review, wrote that "she hit notes that were seemingly impossible; notes that soared up into the stratosphere" and "was just perfect in almost every sense of the word". Nancy Koh from The Straits Times commented that "her moves were slick, her dancing sexy, and she even skipped like a delighted schoolgirl after receiving a few presents from the audience", but also criticised the medley of A Few Best Men. Nur Aqidah Azizi, from the Malaysian newspaper New Straits Times wrote: "Newton-John made her way to centre stage with her seven-piece band, it was evident that the crowd could not contain their excitement – the arena was ringing with rapturous cheer. [...] Her voice was still as sweet as how many would have remembered it. Heartfelt yet powerful, it was perfect in every way". Mike Bradstone from the Sri Lankan Sunday Observer commented that "Newton-John certainly has not lost the charisma and voice and could easily go on for many more years. I would sum up the evening up by saying 'Elegant, classy, graceful, entertaining and well-choreographed'." Lynda Mills from The Jakarta Post wrote: "With her still youthful looks, a voice that remains clear and pure, and an ability to shimmy and shake with the best of them, Olivia belies her 63 years."

== Opening acts ==
- Jon English (Perth)
- Daryl Braithwaite (Melbourne)
- Alfie Boe (Sydney)
- Farhan Azizan (Genting Highlands)
- Lanerolle Brothers (Colombo)
- Blaze & Kelly (Eagle)

== Setlist ==
Australia / Asia
1. "Pearls on a Chain"
2. "Have You Never Been Mellow"
3. "A Little More Love"
4. "Sam"
5. "Xanadu"
6. "Magic"
7. "Suddenly"
8. Country Medley:
  1. "If Not for You"
  2. "If You Love Me (Let Me Know)"
  3. "Banks of the Ohio"
  4. "Let Me Be There"
  5. "Please Mr. Please"
9. "Physical" (contains elements of "Physical" (Acoustic version))
10. "Send In the Clowns"
11. "Not Gonna Give into It"
12. "Grace and Gratitude"
13. A Few Best Men Medley:
  1. "Mickey"
  2. "Daydream Believer"
  3. "I Think I Love You"
  4. "Sugar, Sugar"
14. "Weightless"
15. "You're The One That I Want"
16. "Hopelessly Devoted To You"
17. "Summer Nights"
18. "We Go Together"
19. "I Honestly Love You"

Additional notes

- During her performances in Melbourne, Newton-John performed "It's Always Australia for Me" before "I Honestly Love You".
- The country medley of Asian leg consisted of the songs: "If Not for You", "Let Me Be There", "Please Mr. Please", "Jolene", "If You Love Me (Let Me Know)" and "Take Me Home, Country Roads". The medley of A Few Best Men had an alternative order ("I Think I Love You" was performed before "Daydream Believer").
- During her Asian leg, Newton-John performed "Don't Stop Believin'" after "Grace and Gratitude".
- At the concert in Jakarta, Andy Timmons performed "The First Time Ever I Saw Your Face" to his wife, Martha.
Northalsted Market Days
1. "Xanadu"
2. "Magic"
3. "Suddenly"
4. "Have You Never Been Mellow"
5. "Physical"
6. "Hopelessly Devoted to You"
7. "You're the One That I Want"
8. "I Honestly Love You"
9. "Summer Nights"
10. "Let Me Be There" (Acapella)
North America [2012]
1. "Have You Never Been Mellow" (contains elements of "I Honestly Love You")
2. "A Little More Love"
3. "Sam"
4. "Xanadu"
5. "Magic"
6. "Suddenly"
7. Country Medley:
  1. "If Not for You"
  2. "Let Me Be There"
  3. "Please Mr. Please"
  4. "Jolene"
  5. "If You Love Me (Let Me Know)"
8. "Physical" (contains elements of "Physical" (Acoustic version))
9. Ballads Medley:
  1. "Boats Against the Current"
  2. "Suspended in Time"
  3. "Shaking You"
10. "Weightless"
11. "Don't Stop Believin'"
12. "Not Gonna Give into It"
13. "Deeper Than the Night"
14. "You're the One That I Want"
15. "Hopelessly Devoted to You"
16. "Summer Nights"
17. "We Go Together"
18. "Grace and Gratitude"
19. "I Honestly Love You"

Additional notes

- The songs "Don't Stop Believin'", "We Go Together" and "Grace and Gratitude" weren't performed at the Pacific National Exhibition concert.
- The songs "Come on Over" and "Take Me Home, Country Home" were performed on the country medley in selected separated dates. The chronology of the songs performed on this medley also varies slightly.
- A short acapella version of "Look at Me, I'm Sandra Dee" was performed before "You're the One That I Want" in selected dates.
North America [2013]
1. "Pearls on a Chain"
2. "Have You Never Been Mellow"
3. "What Is Life"
4. "A Little More Love"
5. "Sam"
6. "Xanadu"
7. "Magic"
8. "Suddenly"
9. Country Medley:
  1. "If Not for You"
  2. "Let Me Be There"
  3. "Please Mr. Please"
  4. "Take Me Home, Country Roads"
  5. "Jolene"
  6. "If You Love Me (Let Me Know)"
10. "Physical"
11. "Suspended in Time"
12. "Make a Move on Me"
13. "Not Gonna Give into It"
14. "You're the One That I Want"
15. "Hopelessly Devoted to You"
16. "Summer Nights"
17. "We Go Together"
18. "I Honestly Love You"
United Kingdom
1. "Pearls on a Chain"
2. "Have You Never Been Mellow"
3. "What Is Life"
4. "A Little More Love"
5. "Sam"
6. "Xanadu"
7. "Magic"
8. "Suddenly"
9. Country Medley:
  1. "If Not for You"
  2. "Let Me Be There"
  3. "Banks of the Ohio"
  4. "Please Mr. Please"
  5. "Take Me Home, Country Roads"
  6. "Jolene"
  7. "If You Love Me (Let Me Know)"
10. "Physical"
11. Eurovision Medley:
  1. "Long Live Love"
  2. "Angel Eyes"
  3. "Waterloo"
12. "Make a Move on Me"
13. "Cry Me a River"
14. "Don't Cut Me Down"
15. "Not Gonna Give into It"
16. "You're the One That I Want" (contains elements of "Look at Me, I'm Sandra Dee")
17. "Hopelessly Devoted to You"
18. "Summer Nights"
19. "We Go Together"
20. "Grace and Gratitude"
21. "I Honestly Love You"

== Tour dates ==
Date	City	Country	Venue
Australia
24 February 2012	Perth	Australia	Burswood Theatre
25 February 2012	Perth	Australia	Burswood Theatre
27 February 2012	Melbourne	Australia	Regent Theatre
28 February 2012	Melbourne	Australia	Regent Theatre
1 March 2012	Sydney	Australia	Sydney Opera House
2 March 2012	Sydney	Australia	Sydney Opera House
3 March 2012	Sydney	Australia	Sydney Opera House
Asia
23 March 2012	Bangkok	Thailand	BITEC Event Hall 106
27 March 2012	Marina Bay	Singapore	Esplanade Theatre
29 March 2012	Genting Highlands	Malaysia	Arena of Stars
31 March 2012	Quezon City	Philippines	Smart Araneta Coliseum
2 April 2012	Wan Chai	Hong Kong	HKCEC Grand Hall
4 April 2012	Colombo	Sri Lanka	Musaeus Auditorium
5 April 2012	Colombo	Sri Lanka	Musaeus Auditorium
8 April 2012	Jakarta	Indonesia	Grand Ballroom at Hotel Mulia
North America
12 August 2012^{[a]}	Chicago	United States	Rivers Casino Stage
3 September 2012^{[b]}	Vancouver	Canada	WestJet Concert Stage
6 September 2012	Eagle	United States	Eagle River Pavilion
7 September 2012	Sandy	United States	Sandy Amphitheater
8 September 2012	Layton	United States	Kenley Centennial Amphitheatre
10 September 2012	San Diego	United States	Humphrey's Concerts by the Bay
13 September 2012	San Francisco	United States	Golden Gate Theatre
14 September 2012	Reno	United States	Grande Exposition Hall
15 September 2012	Indio	United States	Fantasy Springs Special Events Center
21 September 2012	Rama	Canada	Casino Rama Entertainment Centre
22 September 2012	Rama	Canada	Casino Rama Entertainment Centre
23 September 2012	Jackson	United States	Potter Center
24 September 2012	Minneapolis	United States	Guthrie Theater
27 September 2012^{[c]}	Minot	United States	All Seasons Arena
28 September 2012^{[c]}	Minot	United States	All Seasons Arena
29 September 2012	Omaha	United States	Kiewit Concert Hall
30 September 2012	Omaha	United States	Kiewit Concert Hall
3 October 2012	Norman	United States	Showplace Theatre
5 October 2012	Greeley	United States	Monfort Concert Hall
6 October 2012	Cheyenne	United States	Cheyenne Civic Performing Arts Theatre
1 November 2012	Jackson	United States	Perkins Civic Center
2 November 2012	Thackerville	United States	Global Event Center
4 November 2012	San Antonio	United States	Majestic Theatre
7 November 2012	Carlton	United States	Otter Creek Event Center
9 November 2012	Kalamazoo	United States	Miller Auditorium
10 November 2012	Aurora	United States	Paramount Theatre
11 November 2012	Sault Ste. Marie	United States	DreamMakers Theater
15 November 2012	Huntington	United States	Paramount Theatre
16 November 2012	North Bethesda	United States	Music Center at Strathmore
17 November 2012	Atlantic City	United States	Etess Arena
6 December 2012	Newberry	United States	Newberry Opera House
8 December 2012	Pittsburgh	United States	Heinz Hall for the Performing Arts
9 December 2012	Cleveland	United States	Palace Theatre
11 December 2012	Newark	United States	Prudential Hall
19 February 2013	Durham	United States	Durham Performing Arts Center
21 February 2013	Easton	United States	State Theatre Center for the Arts
22 February 2013	Lancaster	United States	American Music Theatre
23 February 2013	Shippensburg	United States	Luhrs Performing Arts Center
Europe
10 March 2013	Cardiff	Wales	Motorpoint Arena Cardiff
11 March 2013	Bournemouth	England	Windsor Hall
13 March 2013	London	England	Royal Albert Hall
14 March 2013	Brighton	England	Brighton Centre
15 March 2013	Birmingham	England	NIA Academy
17 March 2013	Manchester	England	O_{2} Apollo Manchester

Festivals and other miscellaneous performances

a This concert is a part of the Northalsted Market Days.
b This concert is a part of the Pacific National Exhibition.
c These concerts are a part of the Norsk Høstfest.

Cancellations and rescheduled shows

18 March 2013	Glasgow, Scotland	Clyde Auditorium	Cancelled due to scheduling conflicts

== Personnel ==
- Andy Timmons – musical director, guitar, backing vocals
- Dan Wojciechowski – drums
- Lee Hendricks – bass
- Catherine Marx – keyboards
- Warren Ham – saxophones, backing vocals
- Steve Real – backing vocals
- Carmella Ramsey – backing vocals
