= Magic: The Very Best of Olivia Newton-John =

Greatest hits album by Olivia Newton-John
- Released: 9 November 2001
- Genre: Pop
- Producer: John Farrar, Jeff Lynne, David Foster

Olivia Newton-John chronology
One Woman's Live Journey (2000)	Magic: The Very Best of Olivia Newton-John (2001)	The Definitive Collection (2001)

Magic: The Very Best of Olivia Newton-John is a 2001 greatest hits compilation from Olivia Newton-John released in North America only. The Definitive Collection was released at a similar time in other regions. This was the first compilation from Newton-John to include all 15 of her Top 10 hits on the Billboard Hot 100 and the first Newton-John album to include "The Grease Megamix".

== Reception ==
Stephen Thomas Erlewine of AllMusic felt Magic: The Very Best of Olivia Newton-John is "the best compilation ever assembled on Newton-John's career, largely because it does cover her entire career, hitting every major point."

== Track listing ==
1. "Let Me Be There" (John Rostill) - 2:58 from Music Makes My Day
2. "If You Love Me (Let Me Know)" (Rostill) - 3:12 from If You Love Me, Let Me Know
3. "I Honestly Love You" (Peter Allen, Jeff Barry) - 3:37 from Long Live Love
4. "Have You Never Been Mellow" (John Farrar) - 3:31 from Have You Never Been Mellow
5. "Please Mr. Please" (Bruce Welch, Rostill) - 3:23 from Have You Never Been Mellow
6. "Come On Over" (Barry Gibb, Robin Gibb) - 3:41 from Come On Over
7. "Don't Stop Believin'" (Farrar) - 3:37 from Don't Stop Believin'
8. "Sam" (Farrar, Hank Marvin, Don Black) - 3:43 from Don't Stop Believin'
9. "You're the One That I Want" (Farrar) - 2:49, duet with John Travolta from Grease
10. "Hopelessly Devoted To You" (Farrar) - 3:06 from Grease
11. "Summer Nights" (Jim Jacobs, Warren Casey) - 3:36, duet with Travolta, from Grease
12. "A Little More Love" (Farrar) - 3:28 from Totally Hot
13. "Deeper Than the Night" (Tom Snow, Johnny Vastano) - 3:37 from Totally Hot
14. "Magic" (Farrar) - 4:30 from Xanadu
15. "Xanadu" (Jeff Lynne) - 3:29, with Electric Light Orchestra, from Xanadu
16. "Suddenly" (Farrar) - 4:01, duet with Cliff Richard, from Xanadu
17. "Physical" (Steve Kipner, Terry Shaddick) - 3:43 from Physical
18. "Make a Move on Me" (Farrar, Snow) - 3:16 from Physical
19. "Heart Attack" (Kipner, Paul Bliss) - 3:07 from Olivia's Greatest Hits Vol. 2
20. "Twist of Fate" (Kipner, Peter Beckett) - 3:38 from Two of a Kind
21. "The Grease Megamix" (Farrar, Jacobs, Casey) - 4:50, duet with Travolta

All tracks produced by John Farrar, except "Xanadu" produced by Jeff Lynne and "Twist of Fate" produced by David Foster.

== Charts ==
Chart (2001)	Peak position
US Billboard 200	150
