= Love Performance =

Live album by Olivia Newton-John
- Released: 1981
- Recorded: 3–4 December 1976
- Genre: Country pop, pop, soft rock
- Length: 49:00
- Label: EMI Japan
- Producer: John Farrar

Olivia Newton-John chronology
Xanadu (1980)	Love Performance (1981)	Physical (1981)

Love Performance is the first live album by Australian singer-songwriter Olivia Newton-John. It was recorded in 1976, during the Love Performance Tour, in Japan. The tour promoted her 1976 album, Don't Stop Believin'. The album was released only in 1981 by EMI Music Japan (formerly Toshiba EMI). The vinyl LP sold 123,590 and the cassette 10,600 copies in Japan.

No re-release has been made since the original issue, making this a coveted item among Olivia's fans. However, six tracks were released as bonus tracks on the re-release of some Newton-John studio albums, which were included in the box 40th Anniversary Collection, released by Universal Music Japan.

== Background ==
The album artwork and booklet features pictures from Totally Hot World Tour. The booklet also lists the tracks "Take Me Home, Country Roads", "The Air That I Breathe" and "Nevertheless" as, respectively, "Country Roads", "Air That I Breathe" and "Never the Less".

It's the only released performances of "Nevertheless", "As Time Goes By" and "Love Is Alive" by Newton-John (all three songs were also performed in the 1977 TV special, Only Olivia).

== Track listing ==
Side one
No.	Title	Writer(s)	Length
1.	"Take Me Home, Country Roads"	John Denver, Bill Danoff, Taffy Nivert	3:01
2.	"The Air That I Breathe"	Albert Hammond, Mike Hazlewood	4:42
3.	"Don't Stop Believin'"	John Farrar	3:39
4.	"Let Me Be There"	Rostill	3:14
5.	"Pony Ride"	Diane Berglund, Jim Phillips	4:36
6.	"Never The Less" / "As Time Goes By"	Harry Ruby, Bert Kalmar / Herman Hupfeld	4:50

Side two
No.	Title	Writer(s)	Length
1.	"Love Is Alive"	Gary Wright	3:35
2.	"New Born Babe"	Glenn Cardier	3:36
3.	"Something Better to Do"	Farrar	3:07
4.	"Jolene"	Dolly Parton	3:58
5.	"Have You Never Been Mellow"	Farrar	4:10
6.	"If You Love Me (Let Me Know)"	John Rostill	3:12
7.	"I Honestly Love You"	Peter Allen, Jeff Barry	5:20
