= Back to Basics: The Essential Collection 1971–1992 =

1992 greatest hits album by Olivia Newton-John

Greatest hits album by Olivia Newton-John
- Released: 9 June 1992
- Recorded: 1971–1992
- Genre: Pop; country pop
- Label: Geffen
- Producer: Peter Asher; Harding Curnow; John Farrar; David Foster; Elton John; Jeff Lynne; Giorgio Moroder; James Newton Howard; Guy Roche; Louis St. Louis; Diane Warren; Bruce Welch

Olivia Newton-John chronology
| Warm and Tender (1989) | Back to Basics: The Essential Collection 1971–1992 (1992) | Gaia: One Woman's Journey (1994) |

Singles from Back to Basics: The Essential Collection 1971–1992
- 1. "I Need Love" Released: June 1992; 2. "Deeper Than a River" Released: August 1992

Professional ratings
Review scores
| Source | Rating |
|---|---|
| AllMusic | 4.5/5 stars |

Back to Basics: The Essential Collection 1971–1992 is the third greatest hits album by English-Australian singer Olivia Newton-John, released on 9 June 1992 by Geffen Records. It is the first compilation to contain both her country and pop hits. The album contained four new tracks: lead single "I Need Love" (produced by Giorgio Moroder), US Adult Contemporary top-20 single "Deeper Than a River", "Not Gonna Be the One" and a cover version of Brenda Lee's 1960 US number one "I Want to Be Wanted". A tour was planned to promote the album, but had to be cancelled when Newton-John was diagnosed with breast cancer.

== Release ==
The album was released with different track listings in different territories in order to feature her biggest hits in each region. Although the album did not chart highly in the US, it was a long-term big seller and eventually certified Gold. The album was a bigger success in the UK and Australia.

== Reception ==
AllMusic rated the album four and a half stars, stating that "an artist well-defined by her hit singles, Olivia Newton-John has had a stylistically varied career, as is illustrated on Back to Basics: The Essential Collection 1971-1992, a set that ranges from her teary ballad "I Honestly Love You" to that bouncy paean to getting horizontal, "Physical." Fans may quibble that such hits as "Let Me Be There" and "Make a Move on Me" are not included, but Newton-John's two greatest-hits albums are out of print, and this is the only collection to combine both her good-girl and bad-girl personae."

In their review of the album, Billboard commented that "it's hard to believe that Livvy has been cranking out guilty pop pleasures for more than 20 years now. Though she has frequently taken a hefty critical slagging, there's no denying that tunes like "If You Love Me (Let Me Know)," "A Little More Love," and "I Honestly Love You" have worn well over time. On this set, which has numerous cuts previously unavailable on CD, ONJ keeps from drowning in nostalgia by offering four strong new songs. "I Need Love," an AIDS-conscious pop/dance cut, is the best radio bet, while "Not Gonna Be The One" proves exactly how much Wilson Phillips really does owe her."

Cashbox stated "the amazing career of Olivia lives on. Her 18th album (second on Geffen) is primarily a greatest hits LP with four new songs...the rest of the album consists of 13 other select should make this record a collector's item."

Spin commented that Newton-John's music was "the soundtrack to a million adolescent infatuations, consummations and separations," noting that "the four new-for-'92 tracks included on this collection harken back to the Olivia of old. Call this a comeback."

== Track listing ==
Back to Basics: The Essential Collection 1971–1992 – American edition
| No. | Title | Writer(s) | Original release | Length |
|---|---|---|---|---|
| 1. | "Deeper Than a River" | Diane Warren | previously unreleased | 4:19 |
| 2. | "Not Gonna Be the One" | Seth Swirsky | previously unreleased | 3:12 |
| 3. | "I Want to Be Wanted" | Giuseppe Spotti; Alberto Testa; Kim Gannon | previously unreleased | 3:26 |
| 4. | "I Need Love" | Stephen A. Kipner; John Lewis Parker | previously unreleased | 4:12 |
| 5. | "Twist of Fate" | Kipner; Peter Beckett | Two of a Kind, 1983 | 3:43 |
| 6. | "Physical" | Kipner; Terry Shaddick | Physical, 1981 | 3:43 |
| 7. | "Magic" | John Farrar | Xanadu, 1980 | 4:25 |
| 8. | "Deeper Than the Night" | Tom Snow; Johnny Vastano | Totally Hot, 1978 | 3:35 |
| 9. | "A Little More Love" | Farrar | Totally Hot | 3:27 |
| 10. | "You're the One That I Want" (with John Travolta) | Farrar | Grease, 1978 | 2:47 |
| 11. | "Summer Nights" (with John Travolta) | Jim Jacobs; Warren Casey | Grease | 3:36 |
| 12. | "Hopelessly Devoted to You" | Farrar | Grease | 3:00 |
| 13. | "Please Mr. Please" | Bruce Welch; John Rostill | Have You Never Been Mellow, 1975 | 3:24 |
| 14. | "Sam" | Farrar; Hank Marvin; Don Black | Don't Stop Believin', 1976 | 3:37 |
| 15. | "Have You Never Been Mellow" | Farrar | Have You Never Been Mellow | 3:28 |
| 16. | "If You Love Me (Let Me Know)" | Rostill | If You Love Me, Let Me Know, 1974 | 3:12 |
| 17. | "I Honestly Love You" | Peter Allen; Jeff Barry | If You Love Me, Let Me Know | 3:36 |
| Total length: | | | | 54:19 |

Back to Basics: The Essential Collection 1971–1992 – European and Japanese editions
| No. | Title | Writer(s) | Original release | Length |
|---|---|---|---|---|
| 1. | "If Not for You" | Bob Dylan | If Not for You, 1971 | 2:53 |
| 2. | "Banks of the Ohio" | Traditional | If Not for You | 3:16 |
| 3. | "What Is Life" | George Harrison | Olivia, 1972 | 3:26 |
| 4. | "Take Me Home, Country Roads" | Bill Danoff; Taffy Nivert; John Denver | Let Me Be There, 1973 | 3:17 |
| 5. | "I Honestly Love You" | | Long Live Love, 1974 | 3:37 |
| 6. | "Have You Never Been Mellow" | | | 3:30 |
| 7. | "Sam" | | | 3:42 |
| 8. | "You're the One That I Want" (with John Travolta) | | | 2:48 |
| 9. | "Hopelessly Devoted to You" | | | 3:06 |
| 10. | "Summer Nights" (with John Travolta) | | | 3:35 |
| 11. | "A Little More Love" | | | 3:29 |
| 12. | "Xanadu" (with Electric Light Orchestra) | Jeff Lynne | Xanadu | 3:28 |
| 13. | "Magic" | | | 4:31 |
| 14. | "Suddenly" (with Cliff Richard) | Farrar | Xanadu | 4:00 |
| 15. | "Physical" | | | 3:43 |
| 16. | "The Rumour" | Elton John; Bernie Taupin | The Rumour, 1988 | 3:56 |
| 17. | "Not Gonna Be the One" | | | 3:04 |
| 18. | "I Need Love" | | | 4:13 |
| 19. | "I Want to Be Wanted" | | | 3:26 |
| 20. | "Deeper Than a River" | | | 4:19 |
| 21. | "Warm and Tender" (Japanese bonus track) | Olivia Newton-John; Farrar | Warm and Tender, 1989 | 3:22 |
| Total length: | | | | 71:21 |

Back to Basics: The Essential Collection 1971–1992 – Australian edition
| No. | Title | Writer(s) | Original release | Length |
|---|---|---|---|---|
| 1. | "I Need Love" | | | 4:14 |
| 2. | "Deeper Than a River" | | | 4:20 |
| 3. | "Not Gonna Be the One" | | | 3:06 |
| 4. | "I Want to Be Wanted" | | | 3:31 |
| 5. | "If Not for You" | | | 2:56 |
| 6. | "Banks of the Ohio" | | | 3:19 |
| 7. | "Let Me Be There" | Rostill | Let Me Be There | 3:01 |
| 8. | "I Honestly Love You" | | | 3:38 |
| 9. | "If You Love Me (Let Me Know)" | | | 3:16 |
| 10. | "Have You Never Been Mellow" | | | 3:33 |
| 11. | "Don't Stop Believin'" | Farrar | Don't Stop Believin' | 3:40 |
| 12. | "Sam" | | | 3:45 |
| 13. | "A Little More Love" | | | 3:30 |
| 14. | "Physical" | | | 3:44 |
| 15. | "Make a Move on Me" | Farrar; Snow | Physical | 3:19 |
| 16. | "Hopelessly Devoted to You" | | | 3:07 |
| 17. | "Xanadu" (with Electric Light Orchestra) | | | 3:29 |
| 18. | "Magic" | | | 4:31 |
| 19. | "Twist of Fate" | | | 3:42 |
| 20. | "Soul Kiss" | Mark Goldenberg | Soul Kiss, 1985 | 4:33 |
| 21. | "The Grease Megamix" (with John Travolta) | Farrar; Jacobs; Casey | standalone single, 1990 | 4:51 |
| Total length: | | | | 73:05 |

The Singles: Australasian Tour Souvenir – 1998 bonus disc
| No. | Title | Writer(s) | Original release | Length |
|---|---|---|---|---|
| 1. | "No Matter What You Do" | Newton-John | Gaia: One Woman's Journey, 1994 | 4:22 |
| 2. | "Don't Cut Me Down" | Newton-John | Gaia: One Woman's Journey | 4:15 |
| 3. | "It's Always Australia for Me" | John Capek; Newton-John | The Rumour | 3:19 |
| 4. | "Can't We Talk It Over in Bed" | Sandy Linzer; Irwin Levine | The Rumour | 3:55 |
| 5. | "The Rumour" | | | 3:59 |
| 6. | "Please Mr. Please" | | | 3:24 |
| 7. | "Jolene" | Dolly Parton | Come On Over, 1976 | 3:07 |
| 8. | "Don't Cry for Me Argentina" | Andrew Lloyd Webber; Tim Rice | Making a Good Thing Better, 1977 | 6:02 |
| 9. | "Heart Attack" | Kipner; Paul Bliss | Olivia's Greatest Hits Vol. 2, 1982 | 3:08 |
| 10. | "Toughen Up" | Terry Britten; Graham Lyle | Soul Kiss | 3:49 |
| Total length: | | | | 38:00 |

== Charts ==
1992 chart performance for Back to Basics: The Essential Collection 1971–1992
| Chart (1992–1995) | Peak position |
|---|---|
| Australian Albums (ARIA) | 15 |
| Danish Albums Chart | 2 |
| European Albums (Eurotipsheet) | 80 |
| New Zealand Albums (RMNZ) | 7 |
| UK Albums (OCC) | 12 |
| US Billboard 200 | 121 |

== Certifications ==
Certifications for Back to Basics: The Essential Collection 1971–1992
| Region | Certification | Certified units/sales |
|---|---|---|
| Australia (ARIA) | Gold | 35,000^{^} |
| United States (RIAA) | Gold | 500,000^{^} |
^{^} Shipments figures based on certification alone.
