= Summer Nights (residency) =

2014–2016 concert residency by Olivia Newton-John

- Residency by Olivia Newton-John
- Location: Las Vegas, Nevada, U.S.
- Venue: The Showroom at The Flamingo
- Start date: 8 April 2014
- End date: 3 December 2016
- Legs: 15
- No. of shows: 180
- Box office: $7,248,206
- Website: Official website

Olivia Newton-John concert chronology
- A Summer Night with Olivia Newton-John (2012–13); Summer Nights (2014–16)

Summer Nights was a concert residency by Australian recording artist Olivia Newton-John. The residency took place in the Donny & Marie Showroom at the Flamingo Las Vegas. It began April 2014 and ended December 2016. Her three-year run even prompted a live album entitled Summer Nights: Live in Las Vegas (2015).

== Background and development ==
Rumours of a Vegas residency were first reported in June 2012. Initially, Newton-John was to perform in the middle of 2013. However, her sister's brain cancer and death postponed the residency indefinitely. On 4 February 2014, the residency was officially announced/resumed for 45 shows beginning April 2014. Entitled, "Summer Nights", the shows were intended to be intimate, not the usual Vegas-style spectacular. Newton-John performed with an eight-piece band and simple staging. She performed her greatest hits, including songs from hit films Grease and Xanadu. During an interview with Closer Weekly, Newton John revealed with former co-star, John Travolta was to come to a show, she would try to get him onstage for a duet. In July 2014, Newton-John confirmed the extension of Summer Nights, with twenty-four additional dates which ran until January 2015. The show was subsequently extended throughout 2015 and 2016.

When asked on her decision to perform in Vegas, Newton-John explained that her previous tours of the United States included performing in casinos in small towns, outside of the metro area. She was told many fans were not willing to travel to the towns however some would travel to Vegas for the Vegas experience. She also stated the comfort of performing at one venue for the tenure. Speaking of the concerts, Newton-John stated:

"I am thrilled to be able to call Las Vegas home for a while. I have performed here many times through the years and have had nothing but wonderful memories and I look forward to even more fun at the Flamingo. I am especially thrilled that a portion of every ticket sold will benefit the Olivia Newton-John Cancer and Wellness Centre".

== Critical reception ==
Mike Weatherford of Las Vegas Review-Journal stated that "Newton-John said herself in an interview that she’s not a 'razzmatazz' performer. But not long into this by-the-numbers retrospective, I realized she is an entertainer" and "If you expect anything more ambitious from the forever 'nice girl' at this point, well that would just be mean". Steve Bornfeld of Vegas Seven described Summer Nights as a show which "reflects what [Newton-John] has always been: a lovely woman with a pretty voice singing sweet ballads and catchy pop tunes without an ounce of artifice or affectation". Sam Masseur of Vegas Chatter wrote: "For anyone who’s ever enjoyed an Olivia Newton-John song, Summer Nights will be a perfect evening of entertainment".

== Set list ==
This set list is representative of the show on 8 April 2014. It does not represent all concerts for the duration of the residency.

1. "Pearls on a Chain"
2. "Have You Never Been Mellow"
3. "Xanadu"
4. "Magic"
5. "Suddenly"
6. "A Little More Love"
7. "Sam"
8. "If Not for You"
9. "Let Me Be There"
10. "Please Mr. Please"
11. "Take Me Home, Country Roads"
12. "If You Love Me (Let Me Know)"
13. "Physical"
14. "Cry Me a River"
15. "Send in the Clowns"
16. "Not Gonna Give Into It"
17. "Look at Me, I'm Sandra Dee (Reprise)"
18. "You're the One That I Want"
19. "Hopelessly Devoted to You"
20. "Summer Nights"
21. "We Go Together"
22. "I Honestly Love You"
23. "Over the Rainbow"

== Shows ==
Date	Attendance	Revenue
Leg 1
8 April 2014	5,234 / 6,933 (75%)	$594,888
9 April 2014	5,234 / 6,933 (75%)	$594,888
10 April 2014	5,234 / 6,933 (75%)	$594,888
11 April 2014	5,234 / 6,933 (75%)	$594,888
12 April 2014	5,234 / 6,933 (75%)	$594,888
6 May 2014	5,234 / 6,933 (75%)	$594,888
7 May 2014	5,234 / 6,933 (75%)	$594,888
8 May 2014	5,234 / 6,933 (75%)	$594,888
9 May 2014	5,234 / 6,933 (75%)	$594,888
10 May 2014	5,234 / 6,933 (75%)	$594,888
Leg 2
27 May 2014	3,071 / 3,570 (86%)	$365,935
28 May 2014	3,071 / 3,570 (86%)	$365,935
29 May 2014	3,071 / 3,570 (86%)	$365,935
30 May 2014	3,071 / 3,570 (86%)	$365,935
31 May 2014	3,071 / 3,570 (86%)	$365,935
Leg 3
1 July 2014	2,146 / 3,916 (55%)	$264,924
2 July 2014	2,146 / 3,916 (55%)	$264,924
3 July 2014	2,146 / 3,916 (55%)	$264,924
4 July 2014	2,146 / 3,916 (55%)	$264,924
5 July 2014	2,146 / 3,916 (55%)	$264,924
Leg 4
29 July 2014	11,589 / 17,770 (65%)	$1,345,415
30 July 2014	11,589 / 17,770 (65%)	$1,345,415
31 July 2014	11,589 / 17,770 (65%)	$1,345,415
1 August 2014	11,589 / 17,770 (65%)	$1,345,415
2 August 2014	11,589 / 17,770 (65%)	$1,345,415
5 August 2014	11,589 / 17,770 (65%)	$1,345,415
6 August 2014	11,589 / 17,770 (65%)	$1,345,415
7 August 2014	11,589 / 17,770 (65%)	$1,345,415
8 August 2014	11,589 / 17,770 (65%)	$1,345,415
9 August 2014	11,589 / 17,770 (65%)	$1,345,415
12 August 2014	11,589 / 17,770 (65%)	$1,345,415
13 August 2014	11,589 / 17,770 (65%)	$1,345,415
14 August 2014	11,589 / 17,770 (65%)	$1,345,415
15 August 2014	11,589 / 17,770 (65%)	$1,345,415
16 August 2014	11,589 / 17,770 (65%)	$1,345,415
19 August 2014	11,589 / 17,770 (65%)	$1,345,415
20 August 2014	11,589 / 17,770 (65%)	$1,345,415
21 August 2014	11,589 / 17,770 (65%)	$1,345,415
22 August 2014	11,589 / 17,770 (65%)	$1,345,415
23 August 2014	11,589 / 17,770 (65%)	$1,345,415
26 August 2014	11,589 / 17,770 (65%)	$1,345,415
27 August 2014	11,589 / 17,770 (65%)	$1,345,415
28 August 2014	11,589 / 17,770 (65%)	$1,345,415
29 August 2014	11,589 / 17,770 (65%)	$1,345,415
30 August 2014	11,589 / 17,770 (65%)	$1,345,415
Leg 5
7 October 2014	2,126 / 3,859 (55%)	$239,558
8 October 2014	2,126 / 3,859 (55%)	$239,558
9 October 2014	2,126 / 3,859 (55%)	$239,558
10 October 2014	2,126 / 3,859 (55%)	$239,558
11 October 2014	2,126 / 3,859 (55%)	$239,558
Leg 6
11 November 2014	2,360 / 3,805 (62%)	$266,769
12 November 2014	2,360 / 3,805 (62%)	$266,769
13 November 2014	2,360 / 3,805 (62%)	$266,769
14 November 2014	2,360 / 3,805 (62%)	$266,769
15 November 2014	2,360 / 3,805 (62%)	$266,769
Leg 7
2 December 2014	5,993 / 10,720 (56%)	$705,782
3 December 2014	5,993 / 10,720 (56%)	$705,782
4 December 2014	5,993 / 10,720 (56%)	$705,782
5 December 2014	5,993 / 10,720 (56%)	$705,782
6 December 2014	5,993 / 10,720 (56%)	$705,782
9 December 2014	5,993 / 10,720 (56%)	$705,782
10 December 2014	5,993 / 10,720 (56%)	$705,782
11 December 2014	5,993 / 10,720 (56%)	$705,782
12 December 2014	5,993 / 10,720 (56%)	$705,782
13 December 2014	5,993 / 10,720 (56%)	$705,782
30 December 2014	5,993 / 10,720 (56%)	$705,782
31 December 2014	5,993 / 10,720 (56%)	$705,782
1 January 2015	5,993 / 10,720 (56%)	$705,782
2 January 2015	5,993 / 10,720 (56%)	$705,782
3 January 2015	5,993 / 10,720 (56%)	$705,782
Leg 8
3 March 2015	4,969 / 10,490 (47%)	$491,143
4 March 2015	4,969 / 10,490 (47%)	$491,143
5 March 2015	4,969 / 10,490 (47%)	$491,143
6 March 2015	4,969 / 10,490 (47%)	$491,143
7 March 2015	4,969 / 10,490 (47%)	$491,143
10 March 2015	4,969 / 10,490 (47%)	$491,143
11 March 2015	4,969 / 10,490 (47%)	$491,143
12 March 2015	4,969 / 10,490 (47%)	$491,143
13 March 2015	4,969 / 10,490 (47%)	$491,143
14 March 2015	4,969 / 10,490 (47%)	$491,143
17 March 2015	4,969 / 10,490 (47%)	$491,143
18 March 2015	4,969 / 10,490 (47%)	$491,143
19 March 2015	4,969 / 10,490 (47%)	$491,143
20 March 2015	4,969 / 10,490 (47%)	$491,143
21 March 2015	4,969 / 10,490 (47%)	$491,143
Leg 9
26 May 2015	5,317 / 11,005 (48%)	$485,182
27 May 2015	5,317 / 11,005 (48%)	$485,182
28 Nay 2015	5,317 / 11,005 (48%)	$485,182
29 May 2015	5,317 / 11,005 (48%)	$485,182
30 May 2015	5,317 / 11,005 (48%)	$485,182
2 June 2015	5,317 / 11,005 (48%)	$485,182
3 June 2015	5,317 / 11,005 (48%)	$485,182
4 June 2015	5,317 / 11,005 (48%)	$485,182
5 June 2015	5,317 / 11,005 (48%)	$485,182
6 June 2015	5,317 / 11,005 (48%)	$485,182
9 June 2015	5,317 / 11,005 (48%)	$485,182
10 June 2015	5,317 / 11,005 (48%)	$485,182
11 June 2015	5,317 / 11,005 (48%)	$485,182
12 June 2015	5,317 / 11,005 (48%)	$485,182
13 June 2015	5,317 / 11,005 (48%)	$485,182
Leg 10
7 July 2015	9,369 / 21,960 (43%)	$884,835
8 July 2015	9,369 / 21,960 (43%)	$884,835
9 July 2015	9,369 / 21,960 (43%)	$884,835
10 July 2015	9,369 / 21,960 (43%)	$884,835
11 July 2015	9,369 / 21,960 (43%)	$884,835
14 July 2015	9,369 / 21,960 (43%)	$884,835
15 July 2015	9,369 / 21,960 (43%)	$884,835
16 July 2015	9,369 / 21,960 (43%)	$884,835
17 July 2015	9,369 / 21,960 (43%)	$884,835
18 July 2015	9,369 / 21,960 (43%)	$884,835
21 July 2015	9,369 / 21,960 (43%)	$884,835
22 July 2015	9,369 / 21,960 (43%)	$884,835
23 July 2015	9,369 / 21,960 (43%)	$884,835
24 July 2015	9,369 / 21,960 (43%)	$884,835
25 July 2015	9,369 / 21,960 (43%)	$884,835
4 August 2015	9,369 / 21,960 (43%)	$884,835
5 August 2015	9,369 / 21,960 (43%)	$884,835
6 August 2015	9,369 / 21,960 (43%)	$884,835
7 August 2015	9,369 / 21,960 (43%)	$884,835
8 August 2015	9,369 / 21,960 (43%)	$884,835
11 August 2015	9,369 / 21,960 (43%)	$884,835
12 August 2015	9,369 / 21,960 (43%)	$884,835
13 August 2015	9,369 / 21,960 (43%)	$884,835
14 August 2015	9,369 / 21,960 (43%)	$884,835
15 August 2015	9,369 / 21,960 (43%)	$884,835
18 August 2015	9,369 / 21,960 (43%)	$884,835
19 August 2015	9,369 / 21,960 (43%)	$884,835
20 August 2015	9,369 / 21,960 (43%)	$884,835
21 August 2015	9,369 / 21,960 (43%)	$884,835
22 August 2015	9,369 / 21,960 (43%)	$884,835
Leg 11
1 September 2015	3,179 / 6,940 (46%)	$305,095
2 September 2015	3,179 / 6,940 (46%)	$305,095
3 September 2015	3,179 / 6,940 (46%)	$305,095
4 September 2015	3,179 / 6,940 (46%)	$305,095
5 September 2015	3,179 / 6,940 (46%)	$305,095
8 September 2015	3,179 / 6,940 (46%)	$305,095
9 September 2015	3,179 / 6,940 (46%)	$305,095
10 September 2015	3,179 / 6,940 (46%)	$305,095
11 September 2015	3,179 / 6,940 (46%)	$305,095
12 September 2015	3,179 / 6,940 (46%)	$305,095
Leg 12
5 July 2016	3,277 / 7,224 (45%)	$331,057
6 July 2016	3,277 / 7,224 (45%)	$331,057
7 July 2016	3,277 / 7,224 (45%)	$331,057
8 July 2016	3,277 / 7,224 (45%)	$331,057
9 July 2016	3,277 / 7,224 (45%)	$331,057
12 July 2016	3,277 / 7,224 (45%)	$331,057
13 July 2016	3,277 / 7,224 (45%)	$331,057
14 July 2016	3,277 / 7,224 (45%)	$331,057
15 July 2016	3,277 / 7,224 (45%)	$331,057
16 July 2016	3,277 / 7,224 (45%)	$331,057
Leg 13
9 August 2016	3,070 / 7,212 (43%)	$289,312
10 August 2016	3,070 / 7,212 (43%)	$289,312
11 August 2016	3,070 / 7,212 (43%)	$289,312
12 August 2016	3,070 / 7,212 (43%)	$289,312
13 August 2016	3,070 / 7,212 (43%)	$289,312
16 August 2016	3,070 / 7,212 (43%)	$289,312
17 August 2016	3,070 / 7,212 (43%)	$289,312
18 August 2016	3,070 / 7,212 (43%)	$289,312
19 August 2016	3,070 / 7,212 (43%)	$289,312
20 August 2016	3,070 / 7,212 (43%)	$289,312
Leg 14
18 October 2016	4,967 / 7,183 (69%)	$476,890
19 October 2016	4,967 / 7,183 (69%)	$476,890
20 October 2016	4,967 / 7,183 (69%)	$476,890
21 October 2016	4,967 / 7,183 (69%)	$476,890
22 October 2016	4,967 / 7,183 (69%)	$476,890
25 October 2016	4,967 / 7,183 (69%)	$476,890
26 October 2016	4,967 / 7,183 (69%)	$476,890
27 October 2016	4,967 / 7,183 (69%)	$476,890
28 October 2016	4,967 / 7,183 (69%)	$476,890
29 October 2016	4,967 / 7,183 (69%)	$476,890
Leg 15
22 November 2016	N/A	N/A
23 November 2016	N/A	N/A
24 November 2016	N/A	N/A
25 November 2016	N/A	N/A
26 November 2016	N/A	N/A
29 November 2016	1,930 / 3,570 (54%)	$201,421
30 November 2016	1,930 / 3,570 (54%)	$201,421
1 December 2016	1,930 / 3,570 (54%)	$201,421
2 December 2016	1,930 / 3,570 (54%)	$201,421
3 December 2016	1,930 / 3,570 (54%)	$201,421
Total	68,597 / 126,157 (54%)	$7,248,206
