= Every Face Tells a Story (song) =

1976 Olivia Newton-John song

"Every Face Tells a Story" is a song originally written by Michael Allison and Peter Sills for British singer Cliff Richard, whom Olivia Newton-John was a backing singer for in the early 1970s. Richard originally attempted a recording of the song in December 1975 studio sessions for his 1976 studio album I'm Nearly Famous, but it remained unreleased. He recorded the song again for his 1977 studio album Every Face Tells a Story, for which it became the title track.

Richard's version uses the same music, but the lyrics are about Jesus and are Gospel-themed. Although a pop star, Richard is a Christian and sometimes includes Gospel tracks on his albums. Don Black rewrote the lyrics but kept the title, removing the Gospel theme.

== Olivia Newton-John version ==
"Every Face Tells a Story"

Single by Olivia Newton-John

from the album Don't Stop Believin'
- B-side: "Love You Hold the Key"
- Released: November 1976
- Genre: Country, pop
- Length: 3:38
- Label: EMI
- Songwriter(s): Peter Sills; Don Black; Michael Allison
- Producer(s): John Farrar

Olivia Newton-John singles chronology
"Don't Stop Believin'" (1976)	"Every Face Tells a Story" (1976)	"Sam" (1977)

In 1976, Australian pop and country singer Olivia Newton-John recorded a version for her eighth studio album, Don't Stop Believin'. It was released as a single in November 1976 and peaked at #55 on the Billboard Hot 100 chart; #21 on the Hot Country Songs chart; and #6 on the Hot Adult Contemporary Tracks chart. She produced an MTV style promotional clip for the song, which aired on ABC in November 1976. The song was not released in Australia.

=== Charts ===
Chart (1976–77)	Peak position
U.S. Billboard Hot Country Singles	21
U.S. Billboard Hot Adult Contemporary Tracks	6
U.S. Billboard Hot 100	55
Canadian RPM Country Tracks	1
Canadian RPM Adult Contemporary Tracks	5
Canadian RPM Top Singles	58
South Africa (Springbok)	5
U.S. Cash Box Top Singles	71

== Other versions ==
- Swedish pop and country singer Kikki Danielsson covered the song (non-religious version) on her 1982 album Kikki.
- French Author and original performer of "My way", Claude François covered the Olivia Newton-John version in 1977 (Chaque visage dit une histoire).
