= Live at the Sydney Opera House (Olivia Newton-John album) =

Video by Olivia Newton-John
- Released: 15 January 2008
- Recorded: 14–15, 17–18 March 2006
- Genre: Concert
- Length: 127 mins
- Label: EMI
- Director: Jim Shea
- Producer: Mark Kalbfeld & Jim Shea Recorded by Elliot Scheiner and David Hewitt

Olivia Newton-John and the Sydney Symphony Orchestra: Live at the Sydney Opera House is a HD video (16:9) released in 2008 for a tour of four concerts at the Sydney Opera House of singer Olivia Newton-John. The show was done in March 2006 with her band and Sydney Symphony Orchestra conducted by Rick King. Produced by Olivia's Gaia Productions.

== Cast ==
- Olivia Newton-John - vocal

=== Orchestra ===
- Sydney Symphony Orchestra
- Rick King - Conductor/Arranger

=== Musicians ===
- Andy Timmons - Guitar & Vocals
- Dan Wojciechowski- Drums
- Lee Hendricks - Bass
- Catherine Marx - Key
- Warren Ham - Horns & Vocals
- Steve Real - Background Vocals
- Carmella Ramsey - Background Vocals

=== Cameo ===
- Chloe Lattanzi - Herself

== Track listing ==
1. "Have You Never Been Mellow"
2. "Magic"
3. "Xanadu"
4. "Stronger Than Before"
5. "If Not for You"
6. "Let Me Be There"
7. "Please Mr. Please"
8. "Jolene"
9. "If You Love Me, Let Me Know"
10. "Physical"
11. "Don't Stop Believin'"
12. "Dancin'"
13. "Suddenly"
14. "Not Gonna Give In To It"
15. "Cry Me a River"
16. "The Rumour"
17. "Heart Attack"
18. "Make a Move on Me"
19. "Twist of Fate"
20. "Tenterfield Saddler" (Duet with Peter Allen's archive video)
21. "Can I Trust Your Arms"
22. "The Promise (The Dolphin Song)"
23. "You're The One That I Want"
24. "Hopelessly Devoted to You"
25. "Summer Nights"
26. "I Honestly Love You"
27. "Serenity"

== External scenes ==
In the DVD, the songs are merged with Newton-John and her daughter Chloe Lattanzi and band with visiting the beautiful sights of Sydney. The scenes outside take place mostly at Manly Beach and last about 20 minutes.
