= Olivia's Live Hits =

Live album by Olivia Newton-John
- Released: 15 January 2008
- Recorded: March 2006
- Genre: country, pop
- Label: Capitol/EMI

Olivia's Live Hits is a live album released on 15 January 2008, based on the tour of Olivia Newton-John in Sydney Opera House in 2006. A DVD called Live at the Sydney Opera House was also recorded.

== Production ==
The album was recorded with the Sydney Symphony, the tour held four concerts and 27 tracks, but only 10 appear on the album.

== Track listing ==
1. "Have You Never Been Mellow" (03:46)
2. "Magic" (04:35)
3. "Hopelessly Devoted To You" (03:01)
4. "You're The One That I Want" (03:52)
5. "Xanadu" (03:31)
6. "Suddenly" (04:12)
7. "Physical" (04:44)
8. "Don't Stop Believin'" (03:49)
9. "If Not For You" (01:56)
10. "I Honestly Love You" (04:23)

== Musicians ==
- Andy Timmons - Guitar, vocals
- Dan Wojciechowski - Battery
- Lee Hendricks - Low
- Catherine Marx - Keyboards
- Warren Ham - Puffs, vocals
- Steve Real - Vocals
- Carmella Ramsey - Vocals

== Charts ==
Chart performance for Olivia's Live Hits
Chart	Peak position
UK Album Downloads (OCC)	69
US Top Classical Albums (Billboard)	20
