= Gaia: One Woman's Journey =

Studio album by Olivia Newton-John
- Released: 26 July 1994
- Recorded: June 1993–April 1994
- Studios: Music Farm Studios (Byron Bay, New South Wales); Mix This! (Los Angeles, California, USA)
- Genre: Pop
- Length: 54:19
- Label: Festival
- Producers: Olivia Newton-John; Murray Burns; Colin Bayley

Olivia Newton-John chronology
Back to Basics: The Essential Collection 1971–1992 (1992)	Gaia: One Woman's Journey (1994)	Back with a Heart (1998)

Singles from Gaia
- 1. "No Matter What You Do" Released: July 1994; 2. "Don't Cut Me Down" Released: January 1995

Professional ratings
Review scores
Source	Rating
AllMusic	4/5 stars

Gaia: One Woman's Journey is the sixteenth studio album released by Olivia Newton-John on 26 July 1994. For the first time, Newton-John wrote all the songs and co-produced the album.

== Production and release ==
Gaia was Newton-John's first album since she was diagnosed with breast cancer in 1992. Many of the songs were written about her experience, such as "Why Me" and "Not Gonna Give into It", as well as her interest in conservation. Gaia was recorded in Australia during 1993 and 1994 and released by several independent labels internationally, except in Australia where Newton-John was still signed to Festival Records. Gaia eventually saw its US release in 2002 by Hip-O Records and in 2022 by Primary Wave Music. The lead single "No Matter What You Do" reached the Top 40 in Australia and the Top 10 in Iceland. The CD-Single track listing for "No Matter What You Do" included: "Original Version", "Smash Radio Edit" and "Smash Extended Version". "Don't Cut Me Down" was the second single released in Australia.

The songs "Don't Cut Me Down" and "Not Gonna Give In to It" were released as a part of the set list for the One Woman's Live Journey album in 2000 on Hip-O Records. "Not Gonna Give In to It" was later a part of the set list for the live concert DVD release of Live at the Sydney Opera House in 2008.

The song "Don't Cut Me Down" was later used in the film It's My Party in 1996. The song "Trust Yourself" was later used in two films featuring Newton-John, Sordid Lives in 2000 and The Wilde Girls in 2001. The song was later covered by Delta Goodrem in the mini-series Olivia Newton-John: Hopelessly Devoted to You and the accompanying soundtrack album, I Honestly Love You.

== Reception ==
AllMusic called it "a bright stepping stone for the singer's long and winding career," further commenting "what skeptical listeners will interpret as new age drivel is also the most honest and inviting album of her career. She has musically had better albums, better songs to be sure, but Gaia brings us closer to the singer herself than anything from the past."

Alan Jones in Music Week stated that whilst "lyrically challenging, it is also a very tuneful and varied album, beautifully sung...the optimistic 'up' feel of tracks like "No Matter What You Do" (perhaps the album's most commercial song) and the tropical romp "Not Gonna Give Into It" are extremely enjoyable and, though this may not be the most commercially successful album ONJ ever releases, it is a good one."

In their review, The Canberra Times praised the album as "quite a treat...Gaia is a very pleasant surprise. It's an uplifting album, particularly tracks such as "No Matter What You Do" and "Why Me?" both written to purge demons."

== Track listing ==
All songs by Olivia Newton-John.

1. "Trust Yourself" – 5:40
2. "No Matter What You Do" – 4:22
3. "No Other Love" – 3:35
4. "Pegasus" – 5:11
5. "Why Me" – 4:59
6. "Don't Cut Me Down" – 4:14
7. "Gaia" – 7:28
8. "Do You Feel" – 4:22
9. "I Never Knew Love" – 2:48
10. "Silent Ruin" – 3:43
11. "Not Gonna Give into It" – 3:42
12. "The Way of Love" – 4:15

== Personnel ==
=== Musicians ===
- Olivia Newton-John – lead vocals, backing vocals (1, 5, 11, 12)
- Murray Burns – keyboards (1, 2, 4–12), bass (1, 2, 5, 7, 9)
- Colin Bayley – guitars (1, 7, 9, 12), electric guitar (2), acoustic guitar (3, 5, 6, 10), tambourine (6), keyboards (7, 11, 12), drums (9), percussion (9), bass (11, 12), backing vocals (12)
- Dan Harris – guitars (1, 4, 7, 11), acoustic guitar (3, 8), electric guitar (5), ambient guitar (6)
- Dennis Wilson – acoustic guitar (2), steel guitar (2), lap steel guitar (2)
- Kevin Bayley – pedal steel guitar (5, 9), acoustic guitar (8), guitars (9)
- Greg Lyon – fretless bass (3)
- Jack Thorncraft – double bass (8, 10)
- Steve Hopes – drums (1, 2, 5, 7), percussion (3, 5, 11), hi-hat (12)
- Matt Ledgar – congas (1), percussion (3, 5, 11)
- Steve Nugent – percussion (11)
- Don Burrows – clarinet (3), flute (4), bamboo flute (7), bass flute (8), alto flute (10)
- Xue Bing Ellingworth – erhu (6, 7)
- Jarwin Jugurmurra – didgeridoo (7)
- John Hoffman – flugelhorn (11)
- Johnny Amobi – backing vocals (1, 5, 12)
- Risina Antonio – backing vocals (1, 5)
- Jojo Smith – backing vocals (5)
- Grace Knight – backing vocals (11)
- Elizabeth Lord – backing vocals (11)
- Rous School Choir – backing vocals (12)

=== Production ===
- Olivia Newton-John – producer
- Colin Bayley – producer, engineer
- Murray Burns – producer, engineer
- Glen Phirnister – engineer
- John Sayers – engineer
- Kevin Shirley – mixing (1, 2, 5)
- Bob Clearmountain – mixing (3, 4, 6–12)
- Mick Patterson – mix assistant (3, 4, 6–12)
- Leon Zervos – mastering at Abosute Audio (New York, NY, USA)
- Gabrielle Raumberger – art direction, design
- Dylan Tran – design, typography
- Peter Carrette – photography
- Alberto Tolot – photography
- Billy Sammeth – management

== Charts ==
=== Album charts ===
Weekly chart performance for Gaia: One Woman's Journey
Chart (1994–1995)	Peak position
Australian Albums (ARIA)	7
European Albums (Eurotipsheet)	85
Scottish Albums (Official Charts)	51
UK Albums (Official Charts)	33
UK Independent Albums (Music Week)	3

=== Year-end charts ===
1994 year-end chart performance for Gaia: One Woman's Journey
Chart (1994)	Position
Australian Albums (ARIA)	81

=== Singles charts ===
Weekly chart performance for "No Matter What You Do"
Chart (1994/95)	Peak position
Australia (ARIA)	35
Iceland (Íslenski Listinn Topp 40)	6
European Airplay (Chartbound List)	30

== Certifications ==
Certifications for Gaia: One Woman's Journey
Region	Certification	Certified units/sales
Australia (ARIA)	Gold	35,000^{^}
^{^} Shipments figures based on certification alone.
