= This Christmas (John Travolta and Olivia Newton-John album) =

2012 studio album by John Travolta and Olivia Newton-John

Studio album by John Travolta and Olivia Newton-John
- Released: 9 November 2012
- Recorded: April–August 2012
- Genres: Christmas, pop, traditional pop
- Length: 43:20
- Label: Universal Music
- Producers: Randy Waldman; John Farrar; Dave Grusin; Phil Ramone; James Taylor

Olivia Newton-John chronology
A Few Best Men (2012)	This Christmas (2012)	Hotel Sessions (2014)

This Christmas is a Christmas album by John Travolta and Olivia Newton-John, released on 9 November 2012, by Universal Music Enterprises. The first time that Travolta and Newton-John worked together was on the musical film Grease (1978), in which they performed the songs "You're the One That I Want" and "Summer Nights". Both the film and the songs were a commercial phenomenon. This album is the first new artistic work they have done together since the 1983 film Two of a Kind (which features the song "Take a Chance", performed by them). This Christmas is also the 25th studio album, following the 2008 release A Celebration in Song, and the third all-new Christmas album by Newton-John.

== Background and development ==
In March 2012 Newton-John was interviewed by Malaysian newspaper The Star and was asked when was the last time which she talked with Travolta, her answered: "About a month ago. We’re working on a project together. [...] It’s not about Grease!". In late September the virtual shops of Barnes & Noble and Amazon.com listed an album named This Christmas by Travolta and Newton-John, set to be released on 13 November 2012. Rav Holly, from Rav Media Group, posted on Facebook a photo with Travolta and Newton-John, and stated that the company was making the album photoshoot. An official statement came on 2 October, with a post on Olivia's official website and Facebook page.

My desire was to make This Christmas an intimate album, not something too ostentatious or showy. I wanted people to be able to play it around the house or in the car during the holidays, and make us part of your celebration. Gathering around house listening to Christmas music has always been an important part of that time of the year to my family.

— Travolta about the album creation process.

According to statement, This Christmas is "the audio equivalent of those classic network TV specials hosted from the stars’ homes, an intimate, warm set of traditional holiday songs [...]". The album producer was the Grammy Award-winner composer Randy Waldman. All tracks are covers of classic Christmas songs, except "I Think You Might Like It", which was targeted as the "You're the One That I Want sequel." The song was written by Newton-John long-time collaborator John Farrar, who also wrote "You're the One That I Want", according to Newton-John: "If it wasn’t for that song, we wouldn’t be here talking about it 30 years later." The album also features the well-known musicians Kenny G, Barbra Streisand, Chick Corea, Cliff Richard, Tony Bennett, Count Basie Orchestra and James Taylor as special guests on some tracks. All of the album tracks were recorded in one take.

The idea from recording an album came when Newton-John sent a Christmas card to Travolta, noting that the songs of Grease become the best-selling duet in pop music history. Travolta commented: "I thought to myself, ‘Wouldn’t people want to hear us do other songs?’ and immediately came up with the idea of doing a holiday album together. [...] From the moment we decided to do this, magic happened. Everyone we contacted agreed to do it." The two have been good friends since Grease was filmed, and agree to donate the artist proceeds from the album equally to their respective charities, the Jett Travolta Foundation for children's disabilities and the Olivia Newton-John Cancer and Wellness Centre.

It is the second time that "White Christmas" is featured on a Newton-John album, the first time was on 2003 compilation The Christmas Collection, as a duet with Kenny Loggins and Clint Black. The songs "Have Yourself a Merry Little Christmas" (also a duet with Loggins) and "Silent Night" also are featured on this album. Her 2007 album, Christmas Wish, features "Silent Night", as a duet with Jann Arden, and an instrumental interlude version of "Deck the Halls".

== Reception ==
=== Critical response ===
Professional ratings
Review scores
Source	Rating
Allmusic	3/5 stars
The Courier	(positive)
Edmonton Journal	2/5 stars
The Guardian	3/5 stars
The Independent	3/5 stars

This Christmas received mixed reviews from contemporary music critics. Allmusic editor Stephen Thomas Erlewine gave the album three out of five stars, felling that "This Christmas winds up serving both audiences equally well: it'll brighten the season of fans who take this at face value, and for those looking for a ridiculous dose of celeb Christmas cheer." Amanda Ash of the Edmonton Journal gave a less positive review, stating "This Christmas is a train wreck would be an understatement. [...] Depressingly devoid of sentiment, Newton-John and Travolta’s duets also sound incredibly awkward." Phil Johnson of The Independent wrote that "If Christmas is a slush-fest, here's your soundtrack", despite "John Travolta might act singing rather than sing." The Guardian writer Caroline Sullivan commented that "The potential for schmaltz here is great, but it bobs along tastefully, even when Cliff Richard turns up". About the vocal performances, she found that "Travolta and Newton-John themselves sound unfeasibly young and earnest, except when they steer 'Baby It's Cold Outside' in a toe-curlingly 'sexy' direction." Josh Nicholson of The Courier stated that "It all seems very lovey-dovey which is what you want from a Christmas album. It’s a bit of a stocking filler for the over-40s though. It’s a good album I admit that, but it’s no Christmas with Dean Martin."

=== Commercial performance ===
The album debuted at number eighty-one on the Billboard 200, making the first Newton-John's album entry on top 100 since Back with a Heart, which peaked at number fifty-nine in 1998. On 26 December 2012, the album had sold 35,596 in the United States. This Christmas peaked at number thirty-three in Newton-John's native country Australia.

== Promotion ==
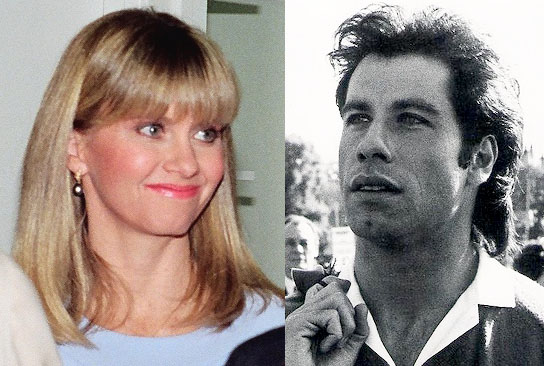
Newton-John and Travolta.

Travolta and Newton-John made several promotional appearances to promote This Christmas in the album release month. They answered questions from fans on the Google Play (4 December) and also were interviewed on Extra (4 December), The Ellen DeGeneres Show (5 December), Australia's Today (5 December), Rove LA (6 December) and Live! with Kelly and Michael (19 December) about the album creation and the Grease phenomenon.

Although no singles were released from the album, a music video for the song "I Think You Might Like It" was released on 4 December 2012. The video was directed by Rav Holly and Corey Molina and received generally negative reviews among music critics and the general public, which criticized the video low-budget production and bad acting. Rolling Stone magazine commented that "the holidays have rarely seemed so sterile." Courtney Hazlett of Today Entertainment called the video "bizarre." Katie Kilkenny of Slate magazine found the video "a new Christmas camp." The Huffington Post gave it a positive review, stating: "There is thumbs-in-the-belt-loops line-dancing, an soul patch on a pocket-chain wearing John Travolta, and a running scene straight out of '10.' All in all, fun for the whole family." According to Billboard, the video was the thirteenth most watched music video on YouTube on week of 22 December 2012, having more than 6 million views in its first week.

== Track listing ==
No.	Title	Writer(s)	Producer(s)	Length
1.	"Baby, It's Cold Outside"	Frank Loesser	Randy Waldman	3:19
2.	"Rockin' Around the Christmas Tree" (featuring Kenny G)	Johnny Marks	Waldman	2:13
3.	"I'll Be Home for Christmas" (featuring Barbra Streisand)	Kim Gannon, Walter Kent, Buck Ram	Waldman	3:32
4.	"This Christmas" (featuring Chick Corea)	Nadine McKinnor, Donny Pitts	Waldman	4:25
5.	"Silent Night"	Traditional	Waldman	4:48
6.	"The Christmas Waltz"	Sammy Cahn, Jule Styne	Waldman	3:00
7.	"Have Yourself a Merry Little Christmas" (featuring Cliff Richard)	Ralph Blane, Hugh Martin	Waldman	4:36
8.	"Winter Wonderland" (featuring Tony Bennett and the Count Basie Orchestra)	Felix Bernard, Dick Smith	Waldman, Phil Ramone	2:30
9.	"White Christmas"	Irving Berlin	Waldman	3:16
10.	"I Think You Might Like It"	John Farrar	Waldman, Farrar	3:11
11.	"The Christmas Song"	Mel Tormé, Bob Wells	Waldman	3:41
12.	"Deck the Halls" (featuring James Taylor)	Traditional	Waldman, Taylor, Dave Grusin	2:41
13.	"Auld Lang Syne" / "Christmas Time Is Here" (Medley)	Traditional / Vince Guaraldi, Lee Mendelson	Waldman	4:08
Total length:				43:20

== Personnel ==
=== Musicians ===
- John Travolta – vocals
- Olivia Newton-John – vocals (1–5, 7–13)
- Randy Waldman – acoustic piano (1, 2, 3, 5, 6, 7, 9, 11), arrangements (1–9, 11, 12, 13), synth bass (2, 3, 6, 12), Fender Rhodes (4), horn arrangements (10), organ (12)
- Chick Corea – acoustic piano (4)
- Monty Alexander – acoustic piano (9)
- John Farrar – synthesizer programming (10), guitars (10), music arrangements (10)
- Sam Farrar – programming (10), bass guitar (10)
- Larry Goldings – harmonium (12)
- George Doering – guitars (1–7, 9, 11)
- Gray Sargent – guitars (8)
- Michael Landau – guitars (12)
- James Taylor – guitars (12), vocals (12), arrangements (12)
- Carlos del Puerto – bass guitar (1, 4, 5, 7, 9, 11)
- Paul Langosch – bass guitar (8)
- Gregg Bissonette – drums (1, 4, 5, 7, 9, 11)
- Teddy Campbell – drums (2, 3, 4, 6)
- Harold Jones – drums (8)
- John Robinson – drums (10)
- Michael Fisher – percussion (12)
- David Boruff – alto saxophone (2, 4, 10), tenor saxophone (2, 4, 10)
- Brandon Fields – baritone saxophone (2, 4, 10)
- Kenny G – tenor saxophone (2)
- Dan Higgins – alto saxophone (7)
- Bob McChesney – trombone (1, 2, 4, 10), trombone solo (6, 11)
- Charles Davis – trumpet (1, 2, 4, 10)
- Chuck Findley – trumpet (1, 2, 4, 10)
- Bruce Dukov – violin solo (3)
- Chris Bleuth – Irish whistle (5)
- Timothy Loo – cello solo (5)
- Charlie Bisharat – fiddle solo (5)
- Stuart Clark – clarinet (13)
- Heather Clark – flute (13)
- Bernadette Avila – oboe (13)
- Bill Hughes – orchestra director for The Count Basie Orchestra (8)
- Lee Musiker – music director for Tony Bennett (8)
- Dave Grusin – arrangements (12)
- Barbra Streisand – vocals (3)
- Cliff Richard – vocals (7)
- Tony Bennett – vocals (8)
- David Lasley – backing vocals (12)
- Kate Markowitz – backing vocals (12)
- Arnold McCuller – backing vocals (12)

Strings on "Medley"

- Randy Waldman – conductor
- Bruce Dukov – concertmaster
- Christine Ermacoff, Paula Hochhalter, Jen Kuhn and Timothy Loo – cello
- Gayle Levant – harp
- Robert Brophy, Caroline Buckman, Carrie Holzman and Shawn Mann – viola
- Charlie Bisharat, Jacqueline Brand, Darius Campo, Lisa Donglinger, Juliann French, Tamara Hatwan, Chris Hebel, Natalie Leggett, Robin Olson, Carol Pool, Anatoly Rosinski, Tereza Stanislav, Alwyn Wright, Yelena Yegoryan and Ken Yerke – violin

=== Production ===
- Mark Hartley – executive producer
- Randy Waldman – producer, mixing (1–7, 9, 11, 12, 13)
- Jeffrey "Woody" Woodruff –recording (1–7, 9, 10, 11, 13), mixing (1–7, 9, 11, 12, 13)
- Darwin Best – vocal recording for Cliff Richard (7)
- Dae Bennett – recording (8), mixing (8)
- John Farrar – mixing (10)
- Don Murray – recording (12)
- William Cho – assistant engineer
- Ray Holzknecht – assistant engineer
- Jeremy Miller – assistant engineer
- Chas Payson – assistant engineer
- Marco Ruiz – assistant engineer
- Alessandro Perrotta – assistant engineer (8)
- Travis Stefl – assistant engineer (8)
- Charlie Paakkari – recording assistant (12)
- Bob McChesney – digital editing
- Kenny O'Brien – digital editing
- Joe Woulmuth – digital editing
- Christine Wu – digital editing
- Erick Labson – mastering
- Dawn Darling – production coordinator
- Anita Heilig – production coordinator
- Dana Sharpe – production coordinator
- JoAnn Tominaga – production coordinator, music contractor
- Jill Dell'Abate – production manager (8), music contractor (8)
- Dee Askew – orchestra management (8)
- Aaron Woodward – orchestra management (8)
- Brian Benison – music preparation
- Ryan Rogers – design
- Rav Holly – photography
- Jade Perry – hair stylist

Studios

- Recorded at Randini Studios (Studio City, California); EastWest Studios and Capitol Studios (Hollywood, California); Entourage Studios, NRG Studios and Pacifique Studios (North Hollywood, California); Moonee Ponds Studios (Malibu, California); Echo Beach Studios (Jupiter, Florida); Ron Rose Productions (Tampa, Flotifa); Deep Diner Studios (Manhattan, New York); Bennett Studios and Bergen/PAC Theater (Englewood, New Jersey).
- Mixed at Randini Studios and Moonee Ponds Studios.
- Mastered at Universal Mastering Studios West (Santa Monica, California).

== Charts ==
Chart (2012)	Peak position
Australian Albums Chart	33
Belgian Albums Chart (Wallonia)	195
US Billboard 200	81
US Top Holiday Albums (Billboard)	19

== Release history ==
Region	Date	Format(s)	Label
Australia	9 November 2012	CD, digital download	Universal Music Enterprises
United Kingdom	12 November 2012	CD, digital download	Hip-O Records
Canada	13 November 2012	CD, digital download	Universal Music Enterprises
Germany	13 November 2012	CD, digital download	Universal Music Enterprises
Italy	13 November 2012	CD, digital download	Universal Music Enterprises
Spain	13 November 2012	CD, digital download	Universal Music Enterprises
United States	13 November 2012	CD, digital download	Universal Music Enterprises
France	19 November 2012	CD, digital download	Polydor Records
