= Let It Shine (Linda Hargrove song) =

1973 single by Linda Hargrove

Single by Linda Hargrove

from the album Music Is Your Mistress
- Released: 1973
- Label: Elektra
- Songwriter: Linda Hargrove

Linda Hargrove singles chronology
"Fallen Angel" (1973)	"Let It Shine" (1973)	"Blue Jean Country Queen" (1974)

"Let It Shine" is a 1973 single written by Nashville songwriter Linda Hargrove.

== Olivia Newton-John's version ==
"Let It Shine"

Single by Olivia Newton-John

from the album Clearly Love
- B-side: "He Ain't Heavy, He's My Brother"
- Released: December 1975
- Genre: Country pop
- Length: 2:24
- Label: EMI
- Songwriter: Linda Hargrove
- Producer: John Farrar

Olivia Newton-John singles chronology
"Something Better to Do" (1975)	"Let It Shine" (1975)	"Come on Over" (1976)

In 1975, Olivia Newton-John recorded a version which was released as the second and final single from her sixth studio album, Clearly Love.

In January 1976, the single went to number one on the US Easy Listening (adult contemporary) chart and number thirty on the Billboard Hot 100. "Let It Shine" peaked at number five on the US Country chart. The B-side of "Let It Shine" was a cover of Bobby Scott-Bob Russell classic "He Ain't Heavy, He's My Brother".

=== Track listing ===
1. "Let It Shine" - 2:26
2. "He Ain't Heavy, He's My Brother" - 3:54

=== Charts ===
Chart (1975–76)	Peak position
Canadian RPM Adult Contemporary	1
Canadian RPM Top Singles	17
Canadian RPM Country Tracks	12
U.S. Billboard Easy Listening	1
U.S. Billboard Hot 100	30
U.S. Billboard Hot Country Singles	5
U.S. Cash Box Top Singles	28

== See also ==
- List of number-one adult contemporary singles of 1976 (U.S.)
