= I Need Love (Olivia Newton-John song) =

1992 single by Olivia Newton-John

Single by Olivia Newton-John

from the album Back to Basics: The Essential Collection 1971–1992
- Released: May 1992
- Genre: Synthpop
- Length: 4:32
- Label: Geffen
- Songwriters: Steve Kipner; John Lewis Parker
- Producer: Giorgio Moroder

Olivia Newton-John singles chronology
"Grease: The Dream Mix" (1991)	"I Need Love" (1992)	"Deeper Than a River" (1992)

"I Need Love" is a song recorded by Australian singer Olivia Newton-John, one of four new tracks recorded for the compilation album, Back to Basics: The Essential Collection 1971–1992 and released as the first single from the record. The song was produced by Giorgio Moroder and written by Steve Kipner who had also penned Newton-John's hits "Physical", "Heart Attack" and "Twist of Fate". The song was a minor hit in the U.S. and U.K. and was later covered by Australian group Girlfriend.

In an interview with Billboard, Newton-John mentioned that the song was an attempt to raise awareness about AIDS, "we need to rethink relationships. It's not wise to jump into bed with people indiscriminately. In fact, it's down right suicidal."

== Critical reception ==
In their review of the single, Billboard stated that "Lovely Livvy is back and has teamed with disco pioneer Giorgio Moroder for a potent pop-dance track. ONJ's distinctive vocal style, matched with a well crafted song could add to a major comeback hit."

In their review of the album, Deseret News singled out the track as "the best" of the four new tracks, due to the production by "discomeister" Giorgio Moroder, "with an upfront dance beat and saucy lyrics that hint it's a sequel to her biggest hit of all, 'Physical.'"

Smash Hits' review was more lukewarm, rating it two out of five stars, commenting that "while she's lost none of her sensitivity, what she's gained is a soft dance beat and a moody ballad. It's OK, but it's no 'I Honestly Love You'".

In their 2022 posthumous top 10 list of the best Newton-John songs, The Guardian ranked the track at number 8, stating "it's such an underrated single and rightly deserves a revival or at least another listen", praising its "sultry, come-hither vocals, pared-back instrumentation and sleek production from the "godfather of electronic music", Giorgio Moroder."

== Charts ==
Chart performance for "I Need Love"
Chart (1992)	Peak position
Australia (ARIA Charts)	109
UK Singles (Official Charts)	75
US Billboard Hot 100	96
US Cash Box Top 100	68
US Hot Dance Club Songs	44
US Dance Singles Sales	28
Canadian Adult Contemporary (RPM)|	29
Norwegian Airplay Charts	10
