= One Woman's Live Journey =

Live album by Olivia Newton-John
- Released: 19 September 2000
- Recorded: August 1999
- Length: 79:47
- Label: Festival Mushroom
- Producer: Olivia Newton-John; Elliot Scheiner

Olivia Newton-John chronology
Highlights from the Main Event (1998)	One Woman's Live Journey (2000)	Magic: The Very Best of Olivia Newton-John (2001)

One Woman's Live Journey is a live album released by British-Australian singer Olivia Newton-John. It was released by Festival Mushroom Records on 19 September 2000 in Australia. Dedicated to Newton-John's mother Irene, the album is a recording of her concert at the Trump Taj Mahal in Atlantic City, New Jersey on 26 and 27 August 1999. One Woman's Live Journey peaked at number 41 in Australia.

== Critical reception ==
Professional ratings
Review scores
Source	Rating
AllMusic	3.5/5 stars

AllMusic editor Charlotte Dillon rated the album three and a half stars out of five and wrote that "though a live album, this Australia-only release is still up to grade and a real pleasure to listen to thanks to the unfailing singing talents of Olivia Newton-John."

== Track listing ==
One Woman's Live Journey track listing
No.	Title	Writer(s)	Length
1.	"Xanadu"	Jeff Lynne	3:40
2.	"Magic"	John Farrar	5:02
3.	"Don't Stop Believin'"	Farrar	3:35
4.	"Please Mr. Please"	Bruce Welch; John Rostill	3:54
5.	"Jolene"	Dolly Parton	2:17
6.	"Let Me Be There"	John Rostill	3:16
7.	"Sam"	Farrar	3:47
8.	"Have You Never Been Mellow"	Farrar	4:05
9.	"Precious Love"	Olivia Newton-John; Anne Roboff	3:46
10.	"Not Gonna Give Into It"	Newton-John	3:30
11.	"Flower That Shattered the Stone"	Joe Henry; John Jarvis	3:25
12.	"Back with a Heart"	Newton-John; Gary Burr	3:25
13.	"Suddenly" (duet with Lindsay Field)	Farrar	3:00
14.	"You're the One That I Want" (duet with Joe Creighton)	Farrar	3:00
15.	"Hopelessly Devoted to You"	Farrar	3:10
16.	"Summer Nights" (duet with Lindsay Field)	Jim Jacobs; Warren Casey	4:24
17.	"Don't Cut Me Down"	Newton-John	5:19
18.	"Somewhere Over the Rainbow"	Harold Arlen; E.Y. Harburg	3:17
19.	"If You Love Me (Let Me Know)"	Rostill	3:31
20.	"Physical"	Steve Kipner; Terry Shaddick	5:30
21.	"I Honestly Love You"	Jeff Barry; Peter Allen	4:16

== Charts ==
Chart performance for One Woman's Live Journey
Chart (2000)	Peak position
Australian Albums (ARIA)	41

== Release history ==
Release history and formats for One Woman's Live Journey
Region	Date	Format	Label	Ref(s)
Australia	19 September 2000	CD	Festival Mushroom	
United States	7 November 2000	CD; DVD	Hip-O	
