= Clearly Love =

Studio album by Olivia Newton-John
- Released: 30 September 1975
- Recorded: May–June 1975
- Studios: EMI Studios, London
- Genres: Country; country pop
- Length: 31:13
- Label: MCA
- Producer: John Farrar

Olivia Newton-John chronology
Have You Never Been Mellow (1975)	Clearly Love (1975)	Come On Over (1976)

Singles from Clearly Love
- 1. "Something Better to Do" Released: September 1975; 2. "Let It Shine" Released: December 1975

Clearly Love is the seventh studio album by Olivia Newton-John, released in September 1975.

== Commercial performance ==
The album was certified gold in the US. and both of the album's singles were country chart hits, with "Something Better to Do" reaching number 19 and "Let It Shine" (written by Nashville songwriter Linda Hargrove) reaching #5. Clearly Love also did well in Japan, reaching number 3 on the Oricon Albums Chart and selling 110,450 copies there. This album received positive reviews at the time of its release.

== Singles ==
The 1940s retro sounding "Something Better to Do" and the country "Let it Shine" (backed with her version of "He Ain't Heavy, He's My Brother") were the two single releases. This song became popular on country music stations, hitting the top 10 on the Country chart. Both singles were number 1 Adult Contemporary chart hits in the United States, but performed comparatively poorly on the Billboard Hot 100 at numbers 13 and 30 respectively, the beginning of a decline at Newton-John's popularity at Top 40 radio in the US that would not be reversed until her starring role in the movie musical Grease in 1978.

== Reception ==
Professional ratings
Review scores
Source	Rating
AllMusic	2.5/5 stars

In their review, Billboard praised the album as "another set from one of the real superstars of pop, and one in which she opens up a bit more than on past efforts and tries a few more types of music. The usual Olivia breathy ballads are here, as well as some country flavored material...As a singer, Miss Newton-John continues to improve and the choice of more varied material is a wise one. As always, John Farrar has come up with excellent production. LP should suit pop fans, country fans and the Las Vegas club type audience she has been steadily building over the past year. Nothing radically different here, but enough to keep her from getting caught in a rut."

Cashbox stated "what makes Olivia Newton-John stand out above the glut of singers is the innocence she exudes. The very fiber of her vocal stance is of a starry-eyed wonder and it is this very magic that makes "Clearly Love" the joy it is. Olivia's excursions into the upbeat laidback are a controlled proposition that work by virtue of the ease of the overall presentation."

Allmusic were more mixed in their assessment of the album, noting "the choices for cover songs on this album are strange indeed" whilst also stating "the gems here are what sound like Olivia Newton-John bread-and-butter staples - "Slow Down Jackson," which is as bubbly and beautiful as "Have You Never Been Mellow"; "Crying, Laughing, Loving, Lying"; the stunning title track "Clearly Love"; along with, of course, the hits...Very pleasant, inoffensive, and able to put the listener in a good mood, Clearly Love is a nice addition to Newton-John's collection."

== Track listing ==
Side one
No.	Title	Writer(s)	Length
1.	"Something Better to Do"	John Farrar	3:16
2.	"Lovers"	Mickey Newbury	2:40
3.	"Slow Down Jackson"	Michele Brourman; Karen Gottlieb	3:05
4.	"He's My Rock"	Sharon K. Dobbins	2:17
5.	"Sail into Tomorrow"	John Farrar	3:40

Side two
No.	Title	Writer(s)	Length
6.	"Crying, Laughing, Loving, Lying"	Labi Siffre	3:00
7.	"Clearly Love"	Diane Berglund; Jim Phillips	2:19
8.	"Let It Shine"	Linda Hargrove	2:26
9.	"Summertime Blues"	Eddie Cochran; Jerry Capehart	2:11
10.	"Just a Lot of Folk (The Marshmallow Song)"	Diane Berglund; Jim Phillips	2:47
11.	"He Ain't Heavy, He's My Brother"	Bobby Scott; Bob Russell	3:54

Japan 2010 SHM-CD bonus tracks
No.	Title	Length
12.	"Something Better to Do" (live in Osaka, Japan, December 1976)	2:55
13.	"Fairy Tale Hero" (previously unreleased)	3:07

== Personnel ==
- Olivia Newton-John – lead vocals
- Graham Todd – keyboards; arrangement on "Slow Down Jackson"
- Terry Britten – acoustic guitar
- John Farrar – acoustic guitar, electric guitar, backing vocals, arrangements
- B.J. Cole – steel guitar
- Keith Nelson – 5-string banjo
- Alan Tarney – bass
- Dave Olney – bass on "Summertime Blues"
- Mike Sammes – bass vocal on "Summertime Blues"
- Brian Bennett – drums
- Vicki Brown – backing vocals
- Pat Farrar – backing vocals
- Margo Newman – backing vocals
- Clare Torry – backing vocals
- John Fiddy – orchestration on "Slow Down Jackson"

=== Production ===
- John Farrar – producer
- Tony Clark – engineer
- Allan Rouse – engineer
- Michael Stavroes – mixing
- Brian Ingoldsby – mastering
- George Osaki – art direction, design
- Charles William Bush – photography
- Larry Marmorstein – graphics

Studios

- Recorded at Abbey Road Studios (London, UK).
- Mixed at AIR Studios (London, UK).
- Mastered at MCA Recording Studios (North Hollywood, California, USA).

== Charts ==
=== Weekly charts ===
Chart (1975–1976)	Peak position
Australian Albums (Kent Music Report)	50
Canada Top Albums/CDs (RPM)	39
Japanese Oricon LP Chart	3
New Zealand Albums (RMNZ)	34
US Billboard 200	12
US Top Country Albums (Billboard)	6
US Cash Box Top Albums	8
US Cash Box Country Albums	7

=== Year-end charts ===
Chart (1976)	Position
US Top Country Albums (Billboard)	20

== Certifications and sales ==
Region	Certification	Certified units/sales
Canada (Music Canada)	Platinum	100,000^{^}
Japan (Oricon Charts)	—	110,450
United States (RIAA)	Gold	500,000^{^}
^{^} Shipments figures based on certification alone.
