= A Celebration in Song =

Studio album by Olivia Newton-John
- Released: 3 June 2008
- Recorded: November 2007 – March 2008
- Genres: Pop, adult contemporary
- Length: 45:59
- Label: Universal Music
- Producers: Amy Sky; Mike Clute; Melinda Schneider; Barry Gibb; Eddie Schwartz; Charles Fisher; Richard Marx; John Farrar; Greg Johnson; Daniel Denholm; Phil Buckie

Olivia Newton-John chronology
Christmas Wish (2007)	A Celebration in Song (2008)	40/40: The Best Selection (2010)

A Celebration in Song is the twenty-third studio album by British-Australian pop singer Olivia Newton-John, released on 3 June 2008 by Warner Bros. in Australia. The worldwide release of the album was by EMI, on 2 September 2008. It is her second duets album, following (2), released in 2002 by Festival Mushroom.

On 25 January 2011, the album was re-released by Spring Hill with a new cover.

== Background ==
The album was released in conjunction with Newton-John's walk to Beijing which, together with this album, raised funds for the future The Olivia Newton-John Cancer and Wellness Center in Melbourne, Australia.

The songs "Never Far Away" (with Richard Marx) and "Sunburned Country" (with Keith Urban) originally belong to Newton-John's 2002 duets album, (2). The song "Beautiful Thing" was taken from Belinda Emmett's album So I Am and the track is "dedicated with love" to her.

== Track listing ==
A Celebration in Song track listing
No.	Title	Writer(s)	Producer(s)	Length
1.	"Right Here with You" (with Delta Goodrem)	Newton-John; Goodrem	Amy Sky	4:02
2.	"Find a Little Faith" (with Cliff Richard)	Sky	Sky	4:13
3.	"Courageous" (with Melinda Schneider)	Newton-John; Schneider	Mike Clute; Schneider; Newton-John^{[a]}; Sky^{[a]}	3:37
4.	"The Heart Knows" (with Barry Gibb)	Barry Gibb; Ashley Gibb; Stephen Gibb	B. Gibb	3:31
5.	"Everything Love Is" (with Jimmy Barnes)	Sky; Schwartz	Eddie Schwartz; Sky^{[a]}	3:58
6.	"Isn't It Amazing" (with Sun)	Newton-John; Sun	Sky	4:08
7.	"Never Far Away" (with Richard Marx)	Marx; Jamey Clewer	Charles Fisher; Marx	4:47
8.	"Sunburned Country" (with Keith Urban)	Newton-John; Urban	Fisher	5:39
9.	"Reckless" (with John Farrar)	Farrar	Farrar	3:20
10.	"Angel in the Wings" (with Jann Arden)	Sky	Greg Johnson; Sky^{[a]}	3:21
11.	"The Water is Wide" (with Amy Sky and RyanDan)	Traditional	Sky^{[b]}	3:26
12.	"Beautiful Thing" (performed by Belinda Emmett)	Emmett; Phil Buckie	Daniel Denholm; Buckie	3:57

Notes

- ^{^[a]} denotes a co-producer
- ^{^[b]} denotes an arranger

== Personnel ==
Performers and musicians

- Olivia Newton-John – vocals
- Andy Downer – keyboards (1)
- Amy Sky – keyboards (1, 6, 11), acoustic piano (11), vocals (11)
- Greg Johnston – programming (1, 2, 10), guitars (1, 2, 10), bass guitar (1, 2, 10)
- Tony Harrell – Hammond B3 organ (3)
- Doug Emery – keyboards (4)
- Hal Roland – keyboards (4)
- Dane Bryant – keyboards (5)
- Gary Prim – keyboards (5)
- Anthony Vanderburgh – keyboards (5)
- Attila Fias – keyboards (6)
- Richard Marx – keyboards (7), programming (7), vocals (7)
- Steve Nathan – organ (8)
- John Farrar – keyboards (9), guitars (9), vocals (9)
- Peter Wolf – additional programming (9)
- Gordon Kennedy – electric guitar (3)
- Mark Punch – acoustic guitar (3)
- Steve Gibb – guitars (4)
- Michael Severs – electric guitar (5)
- Fred Knobloch – acoustic guitar (5)
- Bruce Bouton – pedal steel guitar (5)
- Bill Bell – guitars (6), bass guitar (6)
- Keith Urban – guitars (8), vocals (8)
- Mike Bukovik – guitars (8)
- Jimmie Lee Sloas – bass guitar (3, 5)
- Alison Prestwood – bass guitar (8)
- Mark Kelso – drums (1, 6)
- Dave Sanders – drums (1)
- Steve Brewster – drums (3)
- Lee Levin – drums (4)
- Paul Leim – drums (5)
- Chris McHugh – drums (8)
- Ian Cooper – strings (3)
- Jonathan Yudkin – fiddle (5), cello (5)
- Amy Laing – cello (11)
- Delta Goodrem – vocals (1)
- Cliff Richard – vocals (2)
- RyanDan – harmony vocals (2), vocals (11)
- Melinda Schneider – vocals (3)
- Barry Gibb – vocals (4)
- Jimmy Barnes – vocals (5)
- Sun Ho – vocals (6)
- Martin Landin Chapman – backing vocals (8)
- Steve Real – backing vocals (8)
- Jann Arden – vocals (10)
- Belinda Emmett – vocals (12)

Technical

- Amy Sky – executive producer
- Greg Johnston – recording (1, 2, 10)
- Victor Florencia – mixing (1, 2, 5, 6, 7, 10), recording (4)
- Sam Hannan – recording (1, 6)
- Mark Kelso – recording (1, 6)
- James Freeman – additional recording (3, 11), overdubbing (5), mixing (5)
- Ethan Carlson – recording assistant (2), recording (4), mixing (4)
- Steve Marcantonio – recording (5)
- Bill Bell – recording (6)
- Serge Tsai – recording (6, 10)
- Justin Niebank – engineer (8)
- Elvis Aponte – recording assistant (6, 10)
- Alonzo Vargas – recording assistant (6, 10)
- Todd Gunnerson – assistant engineer (8)
- Noah Passovay – vocal engineer (9)
- Andy Hunt – recording (10)
- John Bailey – recording (11), mixing (11)
- Chuck Turner – mixing (6)
- Cory Barnes – Pro Tools editing (1, 2, 6, 11)
- Joao Carvalho – mastering
- Kelly David Smith – design
- Michael Caprio – cover design
- Juli Balla – cover photography
- David Anderson – photography
- Chad Allen Smith – reissue design, reissue photography

== Concert ==
Olivia Newton-John and Friends: Gala Fundraising Concert
- Concert by Olivia Newton-John
- Venue: State Theatre
- Associated album: A Celebration in Song
- Date: 30 September 2008

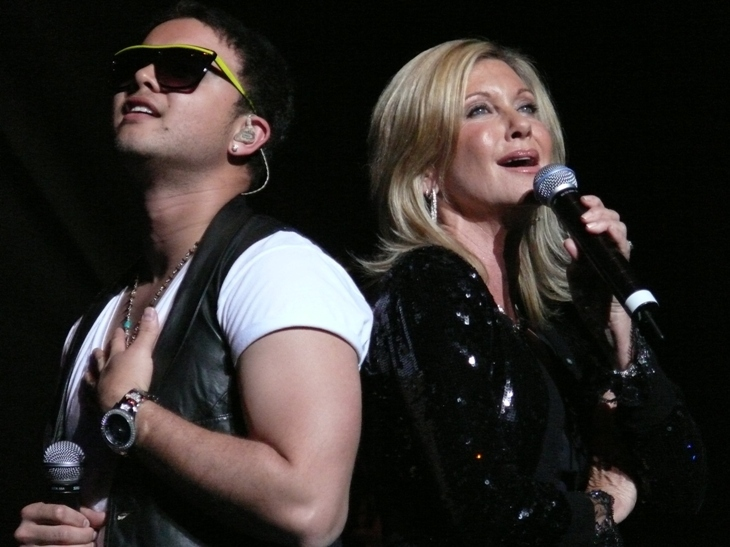
Guy Sebastian and Olivia Newton-John performing "Summer Nights" at the concert.

The Olivia Newton-John and Friends: Gala Fundraising Concert was a one-night only concert based in the album. The concert was held at the State Theatre in Sydney on 30 September 2008 to raise funds for the Olivia Newton-John Cancer and Wellness Centre Appeal.

=== Songs performed ===
- "I Say a Little Prayer" (Paulini)
- "Calling You" (Katy Cebrano)
- "A Song for You" (Katy Cebrano)
- "All Come Together" (Johnny Diesel)
- "My Heart Will Go On" (Trisha Crowe)
- "Someone to Watch Over Me" (Lucy Durack)
- "Sunshine on a Rainy Day" (Christine Anu)
- "My Island Home" (Christine Anu)
- "Blow Up the Pokies" (Tim Freedman)
- "Run to Paradise" (Mark Gable)
- "Reminiscing" (Carl Riseley)
- "Memphis medley" (Guy Sebastian)
- "Tucker's Daughter" (Ian Moss)
- "Perfect" (Vanessa Amorosi)
- "The Horses" (Daryl Braithwaite)
- "Reckless" (James Reyne)
- "Hopelessly Devoted to You" (Chantelle Delaney)
- "Let Me Be There" (with Chantelle Delaney)
- "Tenterfield Saddler" (with Todd McKenney)
- "Summer Nights" (with Guy Sebastian)
- "Pearls on a Chain"
- "Courageous" (with Melinda Schneider)
- "I Honestly Love You"
- "You're the One That I Want" (Mark Gable and Melinda Schneider)
