= The Rumour (song) =

1988 single by Olivia Newton-John

Single by Olivia Newton-John

from the album The Rumour
- B-side: "Winter Angel"
- Released: August 1988
- Recorded: 1987
- Genre: Pop; pop rock
- Length: 3:55
- Label: Mercury
- Songwriters: Elton John; Bernie Taupin
- Producers: Elton John; James Newton Howard

Olivia Newton-John singles chronology
"The Best of Me" (1986)	"The Rumour" (1988)	"Can't We Talk It Over in Bed" (1988)

"The Rumour" is a song recorded by Australian singer and actress Olivia Newton-John for her thirteenth studio album of the same name (1988). It was released as the album's lead single in August 1988 through Mercury Records. The song was written by Elton John and Bernie Taupin, and it features backing vocals and piano by John.

== Critical reception ==
Billboard commented that the single was "benefiting from aggressive pop production and songwriting aid from label mate John, the distinctive songstress is set for a comeback." A reviewer from Cash Box said that "The Rumour" is "the snappiest tune that Olivia's done in a long stretch and she rises to the occasion delivering a heartfelt performance." Jonh Wilde from Melody Maker wrote, "Okay, I'm not trying to suggest that she's The Monkees or anything, but when she gets rocking like this, it's 23 skidoo and away before you know it. Stars like this are not going cheap. We have to give in. It's our duty. I'm entirely serious about all this. Boom, boom, boom. That's me humming the second verse."

== Personnel ==
- Olivia Newton-John – lead vocals, backing vocals
- Elton John – digital piano, lead and backing vocals
- James Newton Howard – additional keyboards, additional synthesizer, drum programming
- Davey Johnstone – guitar
- Neil Stubenhaus – bass
- Carlos Vega – drum overdubs
- Lenny Castro – percussion
- Kim Hutchcroft – baritone saxophone
- Gary Herbig – tenor saxophone
- Dan Higgins – tenor saxophone
- Lew McCreary – trombone
- Bill Reichenbach Jr. – trombone
- Gary Grant – trumpet
- Jerry Hey – trumpet
- Bruce Roberts – backing vocals

== Charts ==
Chart performance for "The Rumour"
Chart (1988)	Peak position
Australia (ARIA)	35
Canada Top Singles (RPM)	50
European Airplay (European Hit Radio)	40
Europe (Eurochart Hot 100)	92
Italy (Italian Singles Chart)	37
Quebec (ADISQ)	24
UK Singles (Official Charts)	85
UK Hi-NRG Dance Chart (Music Week)	7
US Billboard Hot 100	62
US Adult Contemporary (Billboard)	33
US Cash Box Top 100	79
US Hot Dance Club Songs	17
West Germany (GfK)	36
