= A Few Best Men (soundtrack) =

Soundtrack album by Olivia Newton-John
- Released: 20 January 2012
- Recorded: 2011; Las Vegas, Nevada (Paramount Studios); New York City (Youngstar mbc Recording Studios); Malibu, California (John Farrar Studio)
- Genres: Pop, dance-pop, electropop
- Length: 56:03
- Label: Universal
- Producers: Stephan Elliott, Marius de Vries, Lo Five, Guy Gross, Chew Fu, Pablo Calamari, Archie, Roulette, PVH, Laurence Malkin (exec.)

Olivia Newton-John chronology
40/40: The Best Selection (2010)	A Few Best Men (2012)	This Christmas (2012)

Singles from A Few Best Men
- 1. "Mickey (Chew Fu Fix)" Released: 9 January 2012

A Few Best Men: Original Motion Picture Soundtrack and Remixes is the sixth soundtrack album by British-Australian singer Olivia Newton-John, released on 20 January 2012 by Universal Records in Australia. It was released to promote and accompany the 2011 Australian comedy film, A Few Best Men.

The soundtrack basically consists on old pop hits sung by Newton-John and remixed by producers like Chew Fu, Roulette and Archie. The film's director, Stephan Elliott, invited Newton-John in person for the project, and also work as music producer. Some tracks are performed by session musicians credited as "The Wedding Band". Newton-John also recorded a new original track from the soundtrack, "Weightless" (written by her long-time collaborator, John Farrar, and his son, Max).

The lead single is a cover of Toni Basil's "Mickey", released to radio 9 January 2012. A music video was released, without Newton-John appearing. The song "Weightless" also has a music video that was made with clips from the film.

== Background and development ==
When Stephan Elliott and Warren Fahey approached me with the idea of re-recording all of the songs featured in the film, I thought it would be fun as I was familiar with the songs from the 70s and 80s. Stephan and I had great fun recording in Los Angeles. Not only is he a great film director but a very talented music producer – full of fun, energy and musical vision. Having never done a dance and club album before, I was excited to hear what the remixers have done with these songs to make them so clever and different from the originals.

— Newton-John talking about the offer to work on the soundtrack of A Few Best Men

In August 2011, the blog The Randy Report published a notice that Newton-John was producing a dance track with John Farrar and Marius de Vries. This confirmed the rumours that she was doing a dance album, which later proved to be the soundtrack of his new film, A Few Best Men.

The film's director and soundtrack producer, Stephan Elliott, told that his goal is to bring the famous voice of Newton-John together with sharp edged 21st century music style, creating a winning mix. His long-time collaborator, the music composer Guy Gross, produced the songs performed by The Wedding Band and wrote a new original track, "Wankered". Newton-John songs are produced by several well-known remixers. Elliott also co-produced every track of the album. About the first single, Newton-John comments: "For 'Mickey', my sister Rona and I sang the chorus together and, I never realized how cheeky the words were until I read them! My vocal coach, Steve Real, kept my voice alive that day and also added his beautiful voice to the background vocals. The genius remixers worked magic!"

The only Newton-John soundtrack track to actually appear in the film is "Weightless", which is featured in the closing credits. All other songs featured are performed by "The Wedding Band", which includes its soundtrack songs, all the covers performed by Newton-John on the soundtrack album and the unreleased songs "The Ballroom Blitz", "Skippy", "Howzat!", "Falling in Love Again", "Rock and Roll (Part I & II)", "Freeze Frame", "I'm Walking", "The Chicken Dance", "The Twist", "Y.M.C.A." and "Some Girls". The score was composed by Gross and also was not fully commercially released but received an indication for the AACTA Award for Best Original Music Score in 2013.

== Promotion ==
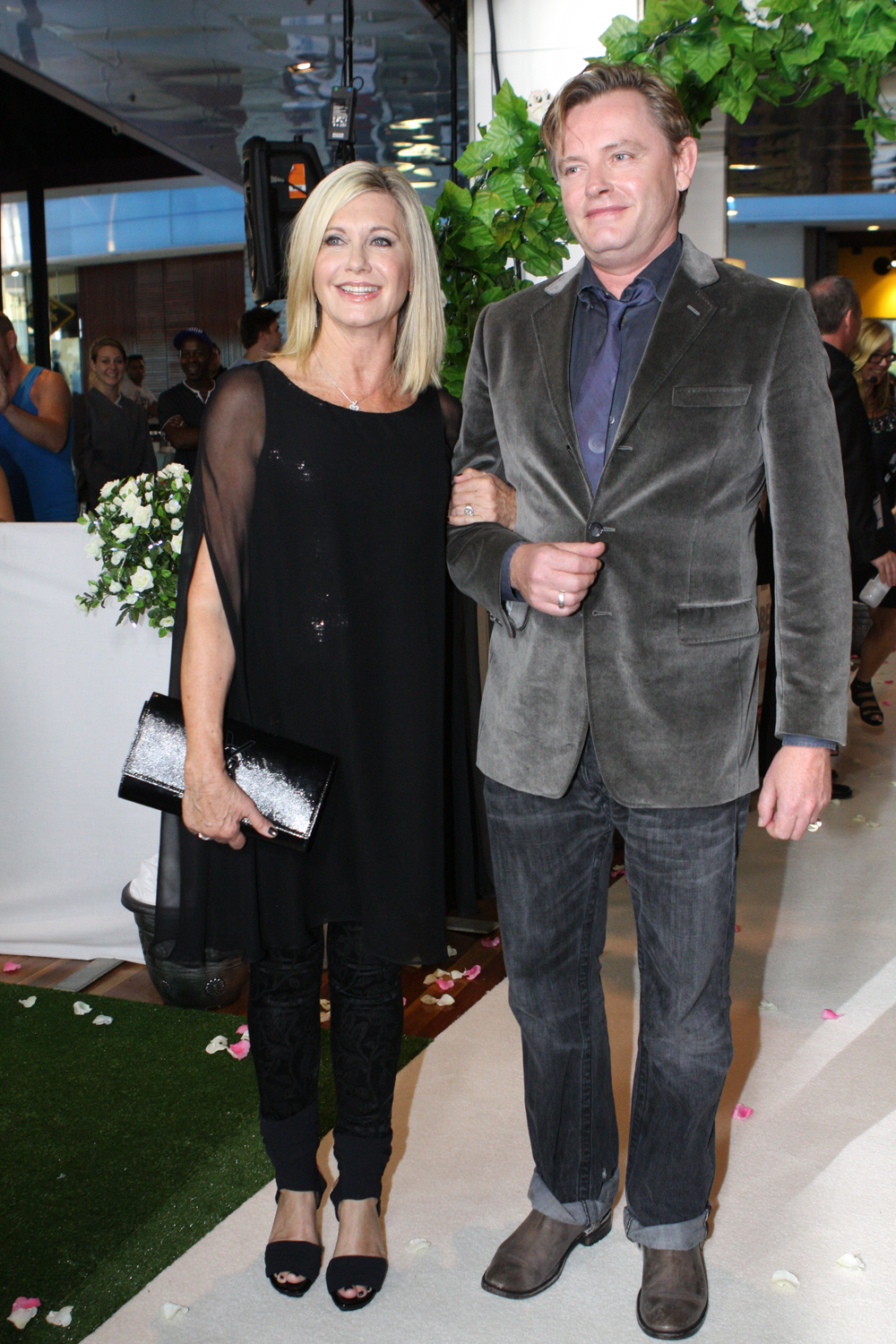
Newton-John with Stephan Elliott at the premiere of A Few Best Men

The promotion of the film and the soundtrack included the participation of Newton-John in several Australian television shows such as The Project and The Circle.

A medley named "A Few from A Few Best Men" (Mirror Ball remix) with the songs "Mickey", "Weightless" and "I Think I Love You" was made for the promotion of songs at dance clubs and video ads. Newton-John sang another medley with the songs "Daydream Believer" and "Weighless" at her performance in 2012 AACTA Awards on 31 January at the Sydney Opera House.

=== A Summer Night with Olivia Newton-John ===
A Summer Night with Olivia Newton-John to promote A Few Best Men soundtrack is the eighteenth worldwide concert tour by Newton-John. The tour first leg began in February 2012, in Australia. Newton-John also performed in Asia, North America and Europe, making this tour her largest since the Heartstrings World Tour, which was finished in 2005.

A medley featuring the songs "Mickey", "Daydream Believer", "I Think I Love You" and "Sugar, Sugar" was added to the setlist for some legs. "Weightless" also was added, performed after the medley. Newton-John performed "Weightless" for the first time on her 2011 United States Tour.

== Critical reception ==
Professional ratings
Review scores
Source	Rating
Allmusic	2.5/5 stars
Herald Sun	1/5 stars

Cameron Adams of Herald Sun gave the soundtrack a negative review, criticizing the album production. About the song "Daydream Believer", Adams says the remixer Pablo Calamari puts Newton-John's vocal in a sonic blender, "turning her into a drowning robot". While some songs like "Georgy Girl" and "Two Out of Three Ain't Bad" have not been criticized, he questions "why does half this record try to turn her into LMFAO?".

Allmusic's Jon O'Brien did a mixed review, also criticizing the auto-tuned production and the vocal performances of "The Wedding Band" musicians. He ends: "Newton-John would have perhaps been better off saving the best songs for a new studio album rather than frittering them away on a mixed bag of a soundtrack which makes the fatal mistake of being more fun to record than to listen to".

== Track listing ==
No.	Title	Writer(s)	Producer(s)	Length
1.	"Weightless"	John Farrar, Max Farrar	Stephan Elliott, Marius de Vries	3:28
2.	"The Rain, The Park & Other Things" (Lo Five remix)	Arthur Kornfeld, Steven Duboff	Lo Five, Elliott	2:27
3.	"The Nips Are Getting Bigger^{[A]}"	Martin Murphy	Guy Gross, Elliott	2:30
4.	"Daydream Believer" (Chew Fu Fix)	John C. Stewart	Chew Fu, Elliott	3:16
5.	"The Pushbike Song" (Pablo Calamari remix)	Evan Jones, Idris Jones	Pablo Calamari, Elliott	4:57
6.	"Wankered^{[A]}"	Gross	Guy Gross, Elliott	1:57
7.	"Afternoon Delight^{[A]}"	Bill Danoff	Gross, Elliott	2:21
8.	"A Beautiful Morning^{[A]}"	Eddie Brigati, Felix Cavaliere	Gross, Elliott	2:54
9.	"Brand New Key" (Archie remix)	Melanie Safka	Archie, Elliott	3:35
10.	"The Love Boat" (Roulette remix)	Paul Williams, Charles Fox	Roulette, Elliott	3:36
11.	"Live It Up^{[A]}"	Greedy Smith	Gross, Elliott	2:23
12.	"Sugar, Sugar" (Chew Fu Fix)	Jeff Barry, Andy Kim	Chew Fu, Elliott	3:25
13.	"Living in the 70's^{[A]}"	Greg Macainsh	Gross, Elliott	2:26
14.	"Devil Gate Drive" (Chew Fu & PVH Night Fever remix)	Nicky Chinn, Mike Chapman	Chew Fu, PVH, Elliott	2:57
15.	"Georgy Girl" (Roulette remix)	Tom Springfield, Jim Dale	Roulette, Elliott	4:20
16.	"I Think I Love You" (Chew Fu & PVH Love Hurts remix)	Tony Romeo	Chew Fu, PVH, Elliott	3:12
17.	"Two Out of Three Ain't Bad" (Lo Five remix)	Jim Steinman	Lo Five, Elliott	5:17
18.	"Mickey" (Chew Fu Fix)	Chinn, Chapman	Chew Fu, Elliott	3:25
19.	"Weightless" (Punk Ninja remix)	John Farrar, Max Farrar	Archie, Elliott	3:27

- A Tracks performed by "The Wedding Band".

== Credits and personnel ==
- Archie – producer, remix
- Jeff Barry – songwriter, instrumentation
- Steeve Body – mixing
- Andy Bradfield – mixing
- Eddie Brigati – songwriter, instrumentation
- Pablo Calamari – producer
- Felix Cavaliere – songwriter, instrumentation
- Mike Chapman – songwriter
- Nicky Chinn – songwriter
- Jim Dale – songwriter, instrumentation
- Bill Danoff – songwriter
- Debaser – booklet art
- Steven Duboff – songwriter
- Stephan Elliott – producer, production coordinator
- Warren Fahey – production coordinator
- John Farrar – songwriter, instrumentation
- Max Farrar – songwriter, instrumentation
- Jason Fernandez – sound engineer
- Lo Five – producer, additional producer
- Charles Fox – songwriter, instrumentation
- Chew Fu – producer, mixing, instruments, programming
- Quentin Gilkey – sound engineer
- Guy Gross – producer, songwriter, instrumentation
- Joe Helson – additional producer, additional programming
- Evan Jones – songwriter
- Idris Jones – songwriter
- Andy Kim – songwriter, instrumentation
- Arthur Kornfeld – songwriter
- Greg Macainsh – songwriter
- Laurence Malkin – executive producer
- Tony Mott – photography
- Martin Murphy – songwriter
- Olivia Newton-John – vocals
- PVH – producer, mixing, instruments, programming
- Steve Real – vocal coach
- Tony Romeo – songwriter
- Roulette – producer
- Melanie Safka – songwriter
- Alexis Smith – additional producer, additional programming
- Greedy Smith – songwriter
- Tom Springfield – songwriter, instrumentation
- Jim Steinman – songwriter, instrumentation
- John C. Stewart – songwriter
- Marius de Vries – producer
- The Wedding Band – vocals
- Paul Williams – songwriter, instrumentation
- Darren Ziesing – mastering engineer

Credits adapted from the album's liner notes.

== Release history ==
Country	Date	Label	Format
Australia	20 January 2012	Universal Music Australia	CD, digital download
United States	31 January 2012	Universal Music Australia (import)	CD, digital download
United Kingdom	31 January 2012	Universal Music Australia (import)	CD, digital download
