= Something Better to Do =

Single by Olivia Newton-John

from the album Clearly Love
- B-side: "He's My Rock"
- Released: September 1975
- Recorded: 1975
- Genre: Country, pop
- Length: 3:15
- Label: EMI
- Songwriter: John Farrar
- Producer: John Farrar

Olivia Newton-John singles chronology
"Please Mr. Please" (1975)	"Something Better to Do" (1975)	"Let It Shine" (1975)

"Something Better to Do" is a song written by John Farrar and recorded by Olivia Newton-John. The song was released in September 1975 as the lead single from Newton-John's sixth studio album, Clearly Love. The narrator of the song muses that she's having a hard time adjusting to life without her departed lover; even the birds are wasting their songs singing to her, and until her beloved returns, "the birds will have to find something better to do."

Record World said that the "Strong multi-tracked chorus contains the old Olivia charm."

"Something Better to Do" was Newton-John's fifth number one on the Easy Listening chart, spending three weeks at the top, while peaking at number thirteen on the Billboard Hot 100. In addition, the song went to number nineteen on the U.S. country chart. The record's performance on the Hot 100 and Country charts seemed to signal the beginning of a downturn in Newton-John's popularity, as it broke her streak of five consecutive singles to make the top ten of both charts stretching back to "Let Me Be There" in early 1974; however, her popularity on easy listening-oriented radio stations continued unabated for a time.

== Charts ==
Chart (1975)	Peak position
Australia (Kent Music Report)	60
Canadian RPM Top Singles	26
Canadian RPM Adult Contemporary	1
New Zealand (Recorded Music NZ)	40
US Billboard Hot 100	13
US Adult Contemporary (Billboard)	1
US Hot Country Songs (Billboard)	19
US Cashbox	15

== See also ==
- List of Billboard Easy Listening number ones of 1975
