= Don't Stop Believin' (album) =

Studio album by Olivia Newton-John
- Released: October 1976
- Recorded: April–May 1976
- Studios: Creative Workshop (Nashville, Tennessee)
- Genres: Country; country pop
- Length: 34:19
- Label: MCA
- Producer: John Farrar

Olivia Newton-John chronology
Come On Over (1976)	Don't Stop Believin' (1976)	Making a Good Thing Better (1977)

Singles from Don't Stop Believin'
- 1. "Don't Stop Believin'" Released: August 1976; 2. "Every Face Tells a Story" Released: November 1976; 3. "Sam" Released: January 1977

Don't Stop Believin' is the ninth studio album by British-Australian singer Olivia Newton-John, released in October 1976. The album received a Gold certification by the Recording Industry Association of America (RIAA) and reached number 33 on the US Billboard 200 and number seven on the US Top Country Albums chart.

The first single released from the album was the title track, which peaked at number 33 on the US Billboard Hot 100 and number one on the US Adult Contemporary chart. "Every Face Tells a Story" ended Newton-John's streak of seven consecutive number-one Adult Contemporary hits. "Every Face Tells a Story" also ended her streak of nine consecutive top-40 hits. "Sam" was Newton-John's highest-charting hit on the Billboard Hot 100 since the number 13 peak of "Something Better to Do".

A live album recorded on the promotional tour for Don't Stop Believin', Love Performance, was released in Japan in 1981, the LP vinyl sold 123,590 and the cassette 10,600 copies there.

== Reception ==
In their review, Billboard praised the "super smooth and soft Olivia vocals and elegantly tight Nashville studio production" calling the album "an outstanding musical treat. Newton-John's singing is at its most expressive and the songs chosen far the LP are of high quality in the ballad to mid-tempo range. The singer can sound perky or ethereally pretty to suit the material and bring off either style. This newest Olivia LP shows her gifts continuing to sharpen."

Cashbox said "Olivia Newton-John's LPs are always greeted with much consumer and industry excitement upon release, and this should be no exception. The title track is already making waves as a single offering, which shouldn't hurt sales at all. John Farrar's production, like the last album, is ultimately sensitive to Newton-John's needs: the instrumentation is sharp, and gives her emotive voice direction, and, at the same time, room to move. Look for 'Every Face Tells a Story' and 'A Thousand Conversations' to get serious play as album cuts. As always, the record will suit tastes across the board: pop, soft-rock, MOR, and country."

Allmusic noted "the 1976 edition of Olivia Newton-John continues the positive vibe that Have You Never Been Mellow initiated...Don't Stop Believin' is one of the slickest of Newton-John's country pop releases. Despite the extra gloss producer John Farrar put on this, it still retains some of the warmth of earlier Newton-John projects while making that inevitable pitch to the '70s record buying public."

== Track listing ==
Side one
No.	Title	Writer(s)	Length
1.	"Don't Stop Believin'"	John Farrar	3:33
2.	"A Thousand Conversations"	Bruce Welch; Hank Marvin	2:58
3.	"Compassionate Man"	Farrar; Chris Christian	3:21
4.	"New-Born Babe"	Glenn Cardier	3:20
5.	"Hey Mr. Dreammaker"	Welch; Alan Tarney	4:05

Side two
No.	Title	Writer(s)	Length
6.	"Every Face Tells a Story"	Peter Sills; Don Black; Michael Allison	3:38
7.	"Sam"	Farrar; Marvin; Don Black	3:43
8.	"Love You Hold the Key"	Olivia Newton-John; Farrar	2:31
9.	"I'll Bet You a Kangaroo"	Larry Murray	3:35
10.	"The Last Time You Loved"	Brian Neary	3:35

2010 Japanese SHM-CD bonus tracks
No.	Title	Length
11.	"Don't Stop Believin'" (Live in Osaka, Japan, December 1976)	3:39
12.	"Looking for Space" (previously unreleased)	3:48

== Personnel ==
Musicians

- Olivia Newton-John – lead and backing vocals
- Shane Keister – keyboards
- Warren Oates – clavinet (4)
- Chris Christian – acoustic guitar
- John Farrar – acoustic guitar, electric guitars, backing vocals
- Steve Gibson – acoustic guitar
- Weldon Myrick – steel guitar (5)
- Joe Osborn – bass
- Larrie Londin – drums, percussion
- Charlie McCoy – harmonica (8)
- Bergen White – string arrangements
- Shelly Kurland String Section – strings
- Donna Fein – backing vocals
- Muffy Hendrix – backing vocals
- Lisa Silver – backing vocals
- Hurshel Wiginton – bass vocals (9)

Production

- Produced and arranged by John Farrar
- Recorded at Creative Workshop, (Nashville, Tennessee)
- Recording engineer – Brent Maher
- Mixed at Cherokee Studios (Los Angeles, California)
- Mixing – Bill Schnee
- Assistant engineer – George Tutko
- Mastered by Mike Reese at The Mastering Lab (Los Angeles, California)

Design

- Cover photos – Charles Bush
- Black and white photos – Jeff Dunas
- Art direction and design – George Osaki
- Costume design/wardrobe/stylist – Fleur Thiemeyer

== Charts and certifications ==
=== Weekly charts ===
Chart (1976)	Peak position
Australia Albums (Kent Music Report)	88
Canada Top Albums/CDs (RPM)	56
US Billboard 200	33
US Top Country Albums (Billboard)	7
US Cash Box Top Albums	34
US Cash Box Country Albums	2
Japanese Oricon LP Chart	3

=== Year-end charts ===
Chart (1977)	Position
US Billboard 200	77
US Top Country Albums (Billboard)	34

=== Certifications and sales ===
Region	Certification	Certified units/sales
Canada (Music Canada)	Gold	50,000^{^}
United States (RIAA)	Gold	500,000^{^}
^{^} Shipments figures based on certification alone.
