= Don't Stop Believin' (Olivia Newton-John song) =

Single by Olivia Newton-John

from the album Don't Stop Believin'
- B-side: "Greensleeves"
- Released: August 1976
- Recorded: 1976
- Genre: Country pop
- Length: 3:33
- Label: EMI
- Songwriter: John Farrar
- Producer: John Farrar

Olivia Newton-John singles chronology
"Jolene" (1976)	"Don't Stop Believin'" (1976)	"Every Face Tells a Story" (1976)

"Don't Stop Believin'" is the title track from the 1976 album by Olivia Newton-John. Written and composed specifically for Newton-John by John Farrar. It was released in August 1976 as the album's lead single. It peaked at number thirty-three on the Billboard Hot 100. It was her seventh number one on the Easy Listening chart, spending one week at the top of the chart in September 1976. The single also went to number fourteen on the country chart.

Record World praised John's double-tracked vocals and John Farrar's arrangement.

Newton-John re-recorded the track for her 2005 album Stronger Than Before. She also titled her 2019 memoir after the song.

Juliana Hatfield covered the song on her album Juliana Hatfield Sings Olivia Newton-John.

== Track listing ==
1. "Don't Stop Believin'" – 3:39
2. "Greensleeves" – 3:42

== Charts ==
Chart performance for "Don't Stop Believin'"
Chart (1976)	Peak position
Australia (Kent Music Report)	93
Canadian RPM Adult Contemporary	5
Canadian RPM Top Singles	22
Canadian RPM Country Tracks	3
New Zealand (Recorded Music NZ)	34
US Billboard Easy Listening	1
US Billboard Hot 100	33
US Billboard Hot Country Singles	14
US Cash Box Top Singles	47
Ireland (IRMA)	17

== See also ==
- List of number-one adult contemporary singles of 1976 (U.S.)
