= Sam (Olivia Newton-John song) =

- Side A of the Australian single

Single by Olivia Newton-John

from the album Don't Stop Believin'
- B-side: "I'll Bet You a Kangaroo"
- Released: January 1977
- Recorded: 1976
- Genre: Country pop, adult contemporary
- Length: 3:43
- Label: EMI
- Songwriters: Don Black, Hank Marvin, John Farrar
- Producer: John Farrar

Olivia Newton-John singles chronology
"Every Face Tells a Story" (1977)	"Sam" (1977)	"Making a Good Thing Better" (1977)

Professional ratings
Review scores
Source	Rating
Record Mirror	2/5 stars

"Sam" is a song performed by British and Australian singer Olivia Newton-John. It was written by Don Black, Hank Marvin and John Farrar.

"Sam" was released in January 1977 as the third and final single from the Newton-John's eighth studio album, Don't Stop Believin' and peaked in the U.S. at number one on the Easy Listening chart and number twenty on the Hot 100. It reached number six in the UK Singles Chart and number one on the Irish Charts.

== Reception ==
Cash Box magazine said "The lovely Ms. Newton-John delivers a pop/easy listening ballad from her Don't Stop Believin' album, and the song, co-written by producer John Farrar, is well-tailored to her vocal style. The appropriate stations should catch on shortly."

== Charts ==
=== Weekly charts ===
Weekly chart performance for "Sam"
Chart (1977)	Peak position
Australia (Kent Music Report)	56
Canada Top Singles (RPM)	25
Canada Adult Contemporary (RPM)	1
Ireland (IRMA)	1
Israel (Israeli Singles Chart)	27
New Zealand (Recorded Music NZ)	16
UK Singles (Official Charts)	6
US Billboard Hot 100	20
US Adult Contemporary (Billboard)	1
US Hot Country Songs (Billboard)	40
US Cash Box Top Singles	34
Quebec (ADISQ)	20

=== Year-end charts ===
Year-end chart performance for "Sam"
Chart (1977)	Position
Canada Top Singles (RPM)	180
UK Singles (OCC)	61
US Billboard Hot 100	129
US Adult Contemporary (Billboard)	18

== See also ==
- List of number-one adult contemporary singles of 1977 (U.S.)
