= Olivia Newton-John videography =

Olivia Newton-John video discography
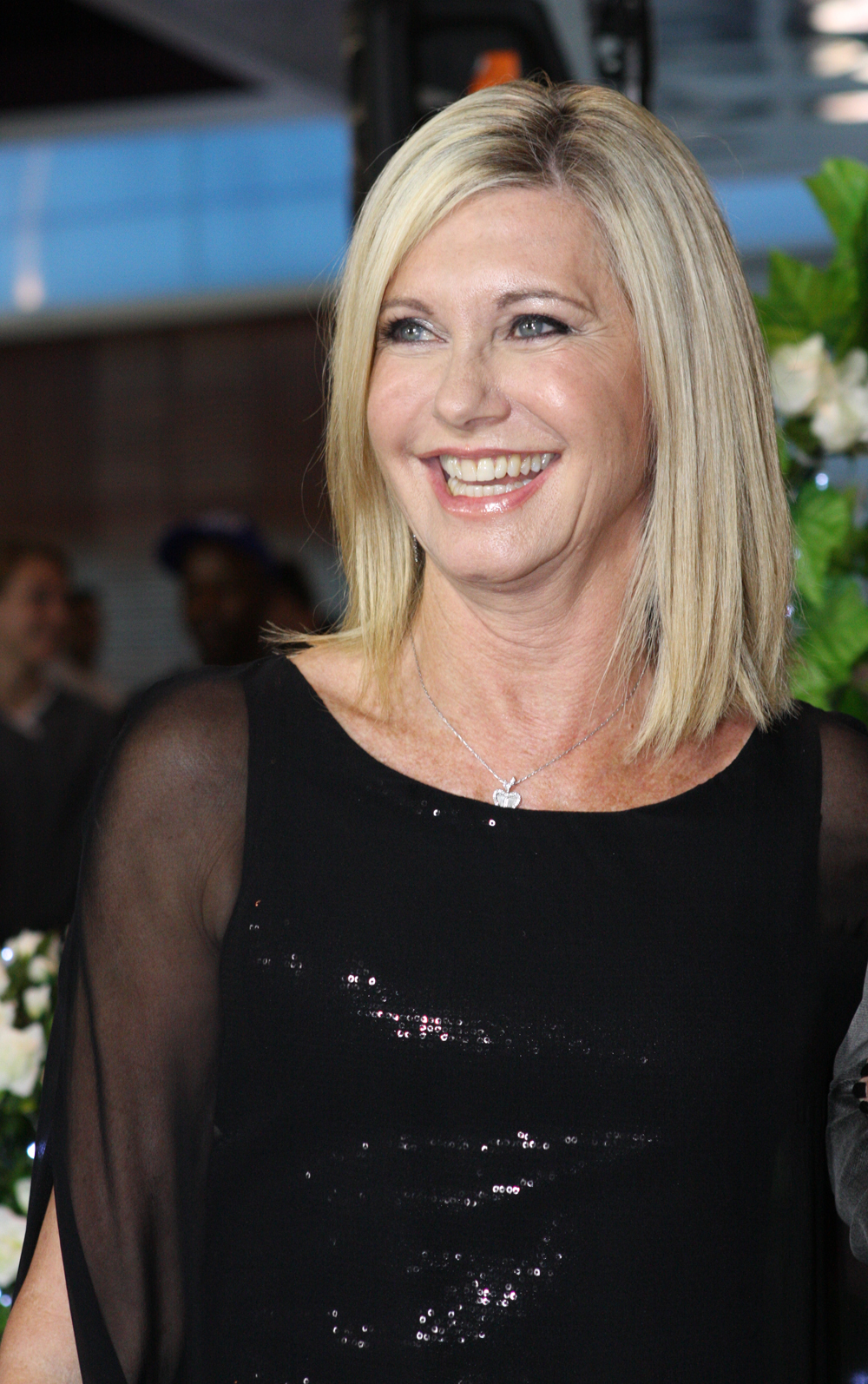
- Newton-John in Sydney at the premiere of A Few Best Men, January 2012.
- Music videos: 62
- Concert tour videos: 3
- Video collections: 4
- Video compilations: 2
- TV special videos: 1
- Promotional videos: 3

The videography of English and Australian singer Olivia Newton-John consists of sixty-two music videos, three concert tour videos, four music video collections, two music video compilations, one TV special video and three promotional videos for television programs.

Newton-John's first music video was for "Follow Me", a promotional single from her 1975 album Have You Never Been Mellow. She released another four music videos (including two from live performances) before Grease. The singles from Grease had excerpts from the film as music videos, with heavy rotation in television. After Grease, Newton-John's image changed from goody-goody "Sandy 1" to spandex-clad "Sandy 2", and she released the successful album Totally Hot, with four new music videos (including one live on tour). It was Newton-John's first pop studio album; before that, her career was focused on country music.

Although initially Newton-John did not want to release it, in 1981 "Physical" came out with a music video for the song. The single was a commercial phenomenon, staying for ten weeks on the top of the Billboard Hot 100. The music video was very controversial and was banned by several broadcasters (MTV originally cut the ending). The following year Newton-John released the ABC television special Let's Get Physical, with the music video for "Physical" and new music videos for the Physical album and the Grease and Xanadu soundtracks. The special was a success and received a home video release with two new music videos added ("Love Make Me Strong" and "Falling"), as Olivia Physical. The video won a Grammy Award for Video of the Year and became an iconic piece of the popular culture. In 1983, another music video collection was released, Twist of Fate. The music videos are from Two of a Kind soundtrack ("Take a Chance" is a duet with John Travolta, who appeared in the music video), starring Newton-John. The music video for "Twist of Fate" was nominated for a Grammy Award for Best Short Form Music Video. The Soul Kiss video was released in 1985 and features five music videos for the songs of the album of the same name.

The last music video collection released by Newton-John, to date, is the musical-style Olivia Down Under. The video premiered in 1988 on HBO and in 1989 on home video, and features various songs from the album The Rumour, plus some unreleased songs. In the video, Newton-John travels through Australia, celebrates the country bicentenary and shows more of the Australian culture. In 1998, Newton-John made a comeback to country music with the album Back with a Heart and recorded two music videos: one for the lead single, a re-recording of her 1975 hit "I Honestly Love You", and another for the song "Precious Love", to promote the album on Country Music Television. In 2011, the music video for "Magic" (Peach & Murphy remix) featured the biggest cast ever for an Australian music video, with over 300 people.

Beyond the official releases, there are also several licensed home video releases by small distributors, with unreleased Newton-John material such as concerts, music videos and television specials. Examples of these releases are the DVDs 20th Century Masters: The Best of ONJ, A Million Lights Are Dancing: The Heartstrings Tour, Simply Olivia and Live in Japan 1976.

== Music videos ==
=== 1970s ===
Year	Music video	Director(s)	Notes
1975	"Follow Me"		
1976	"Don't Stop Believin'"		
1976	"Every Face Tells a Story"		Filmed at Newton-John's house in Malibu, California.
1976	"Sam"		A live performance from The Midnight Special.
1977	"Making a Good Thing Better"		A live performance.
1978	"You're the One That I Want" (with John Travolta)	Randal Kleiser	The music videos for "You're the One That I Want", "Summer Nights" and "Hopelessly Devoted to You" are excerpts from the film Grease.
1978	"Summer Nights" (with John Travolta)	Randal Kleiser	The music videos for "You're the One That I Want", "Summer Nights" and "Hopelessly Devoted to You" are excerpts from the film Grease.
1978	"Hopelessly Devoted to You"	Randal Kleiser	The music videos for "You're the One That I Want", "Summer Nights" and "Hopelessly Devoted to You" are excerpts from the film Grease.
1978	"A Little More Love"	Alan Metter	The music videos for "A Little More Love" and "Deeper Than the Night" were filmed at the same locations.
1978	"Deeper Than the Night"	Alan Metter	The music videos for "A Little More Love" and "Deeper Than the Night" were filmed at the same locations.
1978	"A Little More Love" (Live Version)		A live performance from the Totally Hot World Tour.
1979	"Totally Hot"	Alan Metter	Filmed at Century City, Los Angeles. Includes footage from ABC Entertainment Center and Century Plaza Towers.

=== 1980s ===
Year	Music video	Director(s)	Notes
1980	"Xanadu"	Robert Greenwald	Excerpt from the film Xanadu.
1981	"Physical"	Brian Grant	Filmed for the Olivia Physical video collection.
1982	"Landslide"	Brian Grant	Filmed for the Olivia Physical video collection.
1982	"Magic"	Brian Grant	Filmed for the Olivia Physical video collection.
1982	"Carried Away"	Brian Grant	Filmed for the Olivia Physical video collection.
1982	"A Little More Love" (1982 version)	Brian Grant	Filmed for the Olivia Physical video collection.
1982	"Recovery"	Brian Grant	Filmed for the Olivia Physical video collection.
1982	"The Promise (The Dolphin Song)"	Brian Grant	Filmed for the Olivia Physical video collection.
1982	"Love Make Me Strong"	Brian Grant	Filmed for the Olivia Physical video collection.
1982	"Stranger's Touch"	Brian Grant	Filmed for the Olivia Physical video collection.
1982	"Make a Move on Me"	Brian Grant	Filmed for the Olivia Physical video collection.
1982	"Falling"	Brian Grant	Filmed for the Olivia Physical video collection.
1982	"Silvery Rain"	Brian Grant	Filmed for the Olivia Physical video collection.
1982	"Hopelessly Devoted to You" (1982 version)	Brian Grant	Filmed for the Olivia Physical video collection.
1982	"Heart Attack"	Brian Grant	
1982	"Tied Up"	Brian Grant	
1983	"Twist of Fate"	Brian Grant	Filmed for the Twist of Fate video collection.
1983	"Take a Chance" (with John Travolta)	David Mallet	Filmed for the Twist of Fate video collection.
1983	"Livin' in Desperate Times"	Brian Grant	Filmed for the Twist of Fate video collection.
1983	"Shaking You"	Brian Grant	Filmed for the Twist of Fate video collection.
1985	"Soul Kiss"	David Mallet	Filmed for the Soul Kiss video collection.
1985	"Toughen Up"	David Mallet	Filmed for the Soul Kiss video collection.
1985	"Emotional Tangle"	David Mallet	Filmed for the Soul Kiss video collection.
1985	"Culture Shock"	David Mallet	Filmed for the Soul Kiss video collection.
1985	"The Right Moment"	David Mallet	Filmed for the Soul Kiss video collection.
1986	"The Best of Me" (David Foster with Olivia Newton-John)		Filmed at David Foster's house.
1988	"The Rumour"	Brian Grant	
1988	"Can't We Talk It Over in Bed"	Brian Grant	
1988	"Tutta la vita"	Brian Grant	Filmed for the Olivia Down Under video collection.
1988	"Click Go the Shears"	Brian Grant	Filmed for the Olivia Down Under video collection.
1988	"Walk Through Fire"	Brian Grant	Filmed for the Olivia Down Under video collection.
1988	"Old Fashioned Man"	Brian Grant	Filmed for the Olivia Down Under video collection.
1988	"Let's Talk About Tomorrow"	Brian Grant	Filmed for the Olivia Down Under video collection.
1988	"Winter Angel"	Brian Grant	Filmed for the Olivia Down Under video collection.
1988	"Get Out"	Brian Grant	Filmed for the Olivia Down Under video collection.
1988	"Big and Strong"	Brian Grant	Filmed for the Olivia Down Under video collection.
1988	"Love and Let Live"	Brian Grant	Filmed for the Olivia Down Under video collection.
1988	"It's Always Australia for Me"	Brian Grant	Filmed for the Olivia Down Under video collection.
1989	"Reach Out for Me"		

=== 1990s ===
Year	Music video	Director(s)	Notes
1992	"I Need Love"		The video features snippets from the music videos for "Can't We Talk It Over in Bed" and "Love and Let Live".
1994	"No Matter What You Do"		Filmed at Newton-John's house at Byron Bay, Australia.
1995	"Had to Be" (Cliff Richard and Olivia Newton-John)		
1997	"Falling" (Raybon Brothers and Olivia Newton-John)		
1998	"One Heart at a Time" (with Various Artists)		
1998	"I Honestly Love You" (1998 version)		Filmed at Los Angeles. Includes footage from Newton-John's house in Malibu.
1998	"Precious Love"		Made for Country Music Television.

=== 2010s ===
Year	Music video	Director(s)	Notes
2011	"Magic" (Peach & Murphy remix)	Dan Murphy	The music videos for "Magic" (Peach & Murphy remix) and "Mickey" (Chew Fu Fix) do not feature Newton-John's participation.
2012	"Mickey" (Chew Fu Fix)		The music videos for "Magic" (Peach & Murphy remix) and "Mickey" (Chew Fu Fix) do not feature Newton-John's participation.
2012	"Weightless"		Fan-made with clips from the film A Few Best Men.
2012	"I Think You Might Like It" (with John Travolta)	Rav Holly, Corey Molina	
2015	"You Have to Believe" (with daughter Chloe Lattanzi)		Newton-John's daughter Chloe released a re-working of "Magic". Newton-John sings and appears in the video on the chorus.
2016	"Live On" (with Amy Sky & Beth Nielsen Chapman)	Robert Lynden	

=== Promotional music videos ===
Year	Music video	Director(s)	Notes
1982	"Physical" (Alternative version)		Promotional music video filmed for Brazilian weekly television Fantástico during the Physical promotion in the country.
1992	"I Need Love" (Alternative version)		Promotional music video filmed in the Netherlands during the Back to Basics promotion in the country. The video features an edited version for the song.
2010	"Physical" (Glee cast featuring Olivia Newton-John)	Elodie Keene	The music video is a part of "Bad Reputation" episode from the TV series Glee. It's a remake from the original video, featuring Newton-John and Sue Sylvester (Jane Lynch).

== Video albums ==
=== Concert tour videos ===
Year	Title	Production details	Notes
1983	Olivia in Concert	Released: 1983; Label: MCA Home Video; Format: VHS, Laserdisc, DVD	Contains the Physical Tour as shot live in Ogden, Utah, 1982 in support of her twelfth studio album Physical.; Charted at No. 15 on Billboard Top Videodisks. Was certified gold by the Recording Industry Association of America for shipment of 50,000 units in the United States.
1999	The Main Event	Released: April 1999; Label: Roadshow Home Video; Format: VHS, DVD	Contains The Main Event Tour as shot live in Melbourne, Australia, 1998 in support of her seventeenth album Back with a Heart. An Australia-only release.
2008	Live at the Sydney Opera House	Released: January 2008; Label: EMI; Format: CD, DVD	Contains the 2006 World Tour as shot live in Sydney, Australia, 2008.; Charted at No. 17 on Billboard Music Video Chart.
2015	Two Strong Hearts Live	Released: 2015; Label: Sony; Format: DVD	

=== Music video collections ===
Year	Title	Production details	Notes
1982	Olivia Physical	Released: 1982; Label: MCA Home Video; Format: VHS, Laserdisc	Includes the music videos of "Landslide", "Magic", "Physical", "Carried Away", "A Little More Love" (1982 version), "Recovery", "The Promise (The Dolphin Song)", "Love Makes Me Strong", "Stranger's Touch", "Make a Move on Me", "Falling", "Sivery Rain" and "Hopelessly Devoted to You" (1982 version).; Charted at No. 11 on Billboard Top VHS Sales and at No. 18 on Billboard Top Video Rentals.
1983	Twist of Fate	Released: 1983; Label: MCA Home Video; Format: VHS, Laserdisc	Includes the music videos of "Twist of Fate", "Take a Chance", "Livin' in Desperate Times" and "Shaking You".; Charted at No. 9 on Billboard Top VHS Sales and at No. 14 on Billboard Top Videodisks. Was certified platinum by the Recording Industry Association of America for shipment of 100,000 units in the United States.
1985	Soul Kiss	Released: 1985; Label: MCA Home Video; Format: VHS, Laserdisc	Includes the music videos of "Toughen Up", "Emotional Tangle", "Culture Shock", "Soul Kiss" and "The Right Moment".
1989	Olivia Down Under	Released: 1989; Label: PolyGram Music Video; Format: CD video, VHS, Laserdisc	Includes the music videos of "Tuta la vita", "Click Go the Shears", "Walk Through Fire", "Old Fashioned Man", "Let's Talk About Tomorrow", "Winter Angel", "Get Out", "Big and Strong", "Love and Let Live", "It's Always Australia for Me" and "The Rumour".

=== Music video compilations ===
Year	Title	Production details	Notes
2005	Video Gold I	Released: August 2005; Label: Geffen Home Video; Format: DVD	Promotional music videos from 1978 to 1983. Includes "Deeper Than the Night" "A Little More Love", "Totally Hot", "Landslide", "Magic", "Physical", "Carried Away", "A Little More Love" (1982 version), "Recovery", "The Promise (The Dolphin Song)", "Love Makes Me Strong", "Stranger's Touch", "Make a Move on Me", "Falling", "Silvery Rain", "Hopelessly Devoted to You" (1982 version), "Let Me Be There" (Olivia in Concert), "Please Mr. Please" (Olivia in Concert) and "If You Love Me (Let Me Know)" (Olivia in Concert).; Charted at No. 17 on Billboard Comprehensive Music Videos and at No. 17 on Billboard Top Music Videos.
2005	Video Gold II	Released: August 2005; Label: Geffen Home Video; Format: DVD	Promotional music videos from 1983 to 1998. Includes "Twist of Fate", "Take a Chance", "Livin' in Desperate Times", "Shaking You", "Heart Attack", "Tied Up", "Soul Kiss", "Culture Shock", "Emotional Tangle", "Toughen Up", "The Right Moment", "The Rumour", "Can't We Talk It Over in Bed", "Reach Out for Me", "I Need Love", "I Honestly Love You" (1998 version), "Sam" (Olivia in Concert), "Suddenly" (Olivia in Concert), "You're the One That I Want" (Olivia in Concert) and "Xanadu" (Olivia in Concert).; Charted at No. 21 on Billboard Comprehensive Music Videos and at No. 21 on Billboard Top Music Videos.
2005	Video Gold I & II	Released: October 2005; Label: Universal Home Entertainment; Format: DVD	Region 2 DVD release, containing the music videos from both I and II editions.; Charted at No. 11 on Australian ARIA Charts and certified Gold

=== TV special videos ===
Year	Title	Production details	Notes
1978	Olivia	Released: 1978; Label: MCA DiscoVision; Format: Laserdisc	Contains the Olivia TV special, originally broadcast on ABC in May 1978. Laserdisc-only release.

== See also ==
- Olivia Newton-John discography
