= Video Gold =

Video by Olivia Newton-John
- Released: August 30, 2005
- Recorded: 1970s–1990s
- Genre: Music video
- Label: Universal

Olivia Newton-John chronology
The Main Event (1999)	Video Gold (2005)

Video Gold is a compilation of music videos and clips featuring the singer Olivia Newton-John. They were released on two DVDs separately as Video Gold I and Video Gold II, but there is one issue that unites the two into one.

== Contents ==
=== Volume I ===
- "Deeper Than the Night" (from Totally Hot, 1979)
- "A Little More Love" (Version I) (from Totally Hot, 1979)
- "Totally Hot" (from Totally Hot, 1979)
- "Landslide" (from Physical, 1981)
- "Magic" (from Xanadu OST, 1980)
- "Physical" (from Physical, 1981)
- "Carried Away" (from Physical, 1981)
- "A Little More Love" (Version II) (from Totally Hot, 1979)
- "Recovery" (from Physical, 1981)
- "The Promise (The Dolphin Song)" (from Physical, 1981)
- "Love Make Me Strong" (from Physical, 1981)
- "Stranger's Touch" (from Physical, 1981)
- "Make a Move on Me" (from Physical, 1981)
- "Falling" (from Physical, 1981)
- "Silvery Rain" (from Physical, 1981)
- "Hopelessly Devoted to You" (from Grease OST, 1978)
- "Let Me Be There" (Live) (from Let Me Be There/Music Makes My Day, 1973)
- "Please Mr. Please" (Live) (from Have You Never Been Mellow, 1975)
- "If You Love Me, Let Me Know" (Live) (from If You Love Me, Let Me Know, 1974)

=== Volume II ===
- "Twist of Fate" (from Two of a Kind OST, 1983)
- "Take a Chance" (from Two of a Kind OST, 1983)
- "Livin' in Desperate Times" (from Two of a Kind OST, 1983)
- "Shaking You" (from Two of a Kind OST, 1983)
- "Heart Attack" (from Greatest Hits Vol. 2, 1982)
- "Tied Up" (from Greatest Hits Vol. 2, 1982)
- "Soul Kiss" (from Soul Kiss, 1985)
- "Culture Shock" (from Soul Kiss, 1985)
- "Emotional Triangle" (from Soul Kiss, 1985)
- "Toughen Up" (from Soul Kiss, 1985)
- "The Right Moment" (from Soul Kiss, 1985)
- "The Rumour" (from The Rumour, 1988)
- "Can't We Talk It Over in Bed" (from The Rumour, 1988)
- "Reach Out For Me" (from Warm and Tender, 1990)
- "I Need Love" (from Back to Basics: The Essential Collection 1971–1992, 1992)
- "I Honestly Love You '98" (from Back with a Heart, 1998)
- "Sam" (Live) (from Don't Stop Believin', 1976)
- "Suddenly" (Live) (from Xanadu OST, 1980)
- "You're the One That I Want" (Live) (from Grease OST, 1978)
- "Xanadu" (Live) (from Xanadu OST, 1980)

== Certifications ==
Region	Certification	Certified units/sales
Australia (ARIA)	Platinum	15,000^{^}
^{^} Shipments figures based on certification alone.
