= Physical Tour =

1982 concert tour by Olivia Newton-John

- Tour by Olivia Newton-John
- Cover of tour programme
- Associated album: Physical
- Start date: 9 August 1982
- End date: 23 October 1982
- Legs: 1
- No. of shows: 53 in North America

Olivia Newton-John concert chronology
- Totally Hot World Tour (1978); Physical Tour (1982); The Main Event (1998)

The Physical Tour (also known as the Physical Tour of North America and North American Tour '82) was the fifth concert tour by Australian recording artist Olivia Newton-John, in support of her 12th studio album, Physical (1981). The tour primarily visited North America the second largest by Newton-John, visiting arenas and stadiums.

The show had advanced technical aspects at the time, and was divided into four segments, determined by Newton-John costume changes and a video interlude. The tour was a commercial success and received generally positive reviews, regarded as one of the most popular and most remembered shows by the singer. Footage from the tour has been broadcast on a number of channels across the world. Olivia in Concert, a concert home video of Newton-John's performance in Ogden, Utah, was released in 1983.

== Background and development ==
Billboard announced in July 1982 that Newton-John would embark upon a 50-date North American tour from early August, her first in four years, with a TV concert special, also was confirmed. Newton-John stated that this would be her last tour to concentrate on her film career. However, after the failure of the film Two of a Kind (1983), which she starred again with John Travolta, her film career went on hiatus, and she would return to touring 16 years after this tour.

The first attempts for the setlist included the songs "Come on Over", "Don't Stop Believin'", "Pony Ride" and the music video for "Stranger's Touch" (from Olivia Physical) as a video interlude. The jazz musician Tom Scott was the tour musical director and also played saxophone in the band. He also served as the opening act, performing songs from his album Desire (1982). Olivia's personal friend, Karen Carpenter, attended various tour shows, and considered the possibility of drumming during a few concerts, but dropped because of her deteriorating health. John Travolta also attended a show, and joined the stage with Newton-John.

The stage was created by Kenny Ortega, who also choreographed Newton-John music videos for "Physical" and "The Rumour". The technical features used in concert includes a glittery substance falling during "Silvery Rain", and three videos: an introduction montage about Olivia's career, the music video for "The Promise (The Dolphin Song)" as a video interlude, and screened credits for the band and crew members at the concert ending. Newton-John also jumped rope through "Physical". During a 1983 article for People, Newton-John declared she didn't like to tour in 1982: "Every night was like déja vu. You say to yourself, 'Haven't I just done this?'"

=== Legacy ===
Robert Hilburn from Los Angeles Times compared Debbie Gibson performance on her Out of the Blue Tour with Newton-John's Physical Tour, commenting that "recalled the most triumphant moments of Olivia Newton-John's 1982 'Physical' tour" and "as the evening progressed, it became clear that Newton-John (who exhibited a similar aerobic energy, sparkling smile and even blonde bangs) was a closer parallel". British duo Goldfrapp performed a cover of "Physical" on their 2001 concert tour. Alison Goldfrapp herself said later that Newton-John is one of the duo inspirations.

== Critical response ==
Jon Pareles from The New York Times commented that "purists may be offended – particularly in country music, where she dallied awhile – but pop singers like Miss Newton-John make new styles safe for mass audiences just as they're on the way out. [...] Miss Newton-John has a nearly colorless voice, distinguished mainly by the break between a perky chest register and a fragile head voice. Yet it is also extremely adaptable; onstage, she summoned country's quavers, disco's melismas, pop's directness and hard rock's percussive staccato. She sounds delicate on her records, but she sang a 90-minute set with no obvious strain."

Paul Grein from Billboard wrote: "Newton-John first local apparition in five years – since her co-starring role in Grease revived and redirected her career – was a total triumph, eliciting the boisterous fan response normally seen only at rock shows. [...] Newton-John also sings with greater strengths and conviction, even on the older ballads. Her emphatic vocals gave an extra emotional dimension to the rueful 'Sam' and the plaintive 'Please Mr. Please'."

== Commercial reception ==
The tour performed in 40 cities throughout North America, with a total of 562,428 tickets sold. The Exhibition Stadium show in Toronto, Ontario, Canada, had all of the 24,789 tickets sold. Based on 13 shows, Billboard Boxscore reported a gross of $$2,074,051 and a total boxscore of $8,443,043. Items related to the tour that were sold include clothing, buttons and the tourbook.

== Broadcast and recordings ==
The tour video recording was filmed in Ogden, Utah, on 12–13 October 1982. An interesting fact is that "Physical" has caused controversy in Utah after two radio stations banned the song because "lyrics are more suggestive than most songs". The video was premiered on HBO on 23 January 1983, as Olivia: Live in Concert TV special. It was later released on VHS, CED and laserdisc by MCA Home Video as Olivia in Concert, becoming a critical and commercial success.

The video release peaked at #15 on Billboard Top Videodisks and was certified gold by the Recording Industry Association of America for shipment of 50,000 units in the United States. The video also gave for Newton-John nominations for a Grammy Award for Best Long Form Music Video and a CableACE Award for Actress in a Variety Program. People wrote: "Mini-clad and punk-coiffed, Livvy rocks her way through a concert taped at Weber State College in Utah. "Xanadu" and "Heart Attack" are fetching, but "Physical" is the aerobic showstopper".

== Opening act ==
- Tom Scott

== Setlist ==
- "Video Sequence" (contains elements from "I Honestly Love You", "You're the One That I Want", "A Little More Love", "Xanadu" and "Physical")

Act 1

1. "Deeper Than the Night"
2. "Have You Never Been Mellow"
3. "Let Me Be There" / "If Not for You" / "Please Mr. Please" / "If You Love Me (Let Me Know)"
4. "Jolene"
5. "Sam"
- "Video Sequence"

Act 2

6. "Xanadu"
7. "Magic"
8. "Suddenly" (performed with Dennis Tufano)
9. "A Little More Love"
- "Video Sequence" (contains elements of "The Promise (The Dolphin Song)")

Act 3

10. "Silvery Rain"
11. "Falling"
12. "Heart Attack"
13. "Make a Move on Me"
14. "Hopelessly Devoted to You"
15. "You're the One That I Want" (performed with Tufano)

Encore

16. "Physical"
17. "I Honestly Love You"

== Known tour dates ==
Date	City	Country	Venue
North America
9 August 1982	Columbia	United States	Merriweather Post Pavilion
10 August 1982	Columbia	United States	Merriweather Post Pavilion
11 August 1982	Philadelphia	United States	The Spectrum
13 August 1982	New York City	United States	Forest Hills Stadium
14 August 1982	New York City	United States	Forest Hills Stadium
15 August 1982	New York City	United States	Forest Hills Stadium
16 August 1982	Hartford	United States	Hartford Civic Center
18 August 1982	Saratoga Springs	United States	Saratoga Performing Arts Center
19 August 1982	Boston, Massachusetts	United States	Boston Common
20 August 1982	Providence	United States	Providence Civic Center
22 August 1982	Clarkston	United States	Pine Knob Music Theatre
23 August 1982	Clarkston	United States	Pine Knob Music Theatre
25 August 1982	Montreal	Canada	Montreal Forum
26 August 1982	Toronto	Canada	CNE Grandstand
28 August 1982	Richfield Township	United States	The Coliseum at Richfield
29 August 1982	Hoffman Estates	United States	Poplar Creek Music Theater
30 August 1982	Hoffman Estates	United States	Poplar Creek Music Theater
2 September 1982	Dallas	United States	Reunion Arena
3 September 1982	Houston	United States	The Summit
4 September 1982	Austin	United States	Frank Erwin Center
5 September 1982	Baton Rouge	United States	LSU Assembly Center
8 September 1982	Mobile	United States	Mobile Municipal Arena
9 September 1982	Atlanta	United States	Omni Coliseum
10 September 1982	Atlanta	United States	Omni Coliseum
11 September 1982	Charlotte	United States	Charlotte Coliseum
12 September 1982	Murfreesboro	United States	Murphy Center
14 September 1982	Buffalo	United States	Buffalo Memorial Auditorium
15 September 1982	Pittsburgh	United States	Civic Arena
16 September 1982	Champaign	United States	Assembly Hall
18 September 1982	Lexington	United States	Rupp Arena
19 September 1982	St. Louis	United States	The Checkerdome
21 September 1982	Tulsa	United States	Mabee Center
22 September 1982	Oklahoma City	United States	Myriad Convention Center Arena
24 September 1982	Kansas City	United States	Kemper Arena
25 September 1982	Ames	United States	Hilton Coliseum
26 September 1982	Saint Paul	United States	St. Paul Civic Center
28 September 1982	Denver	United States	McNichols Sports Arena
1 October 1982	Oakland	United States	Oakland–Alameda County Coliseum Arena
2 October 1982	Fresno	United States	Selland Arena
3 October 1982	Davis	United States	Recreation Hall
5 October 1982	Los Angeles	United States	Universal Amphitheatre
6 October 1982	Los Angeles	United States	Universal Amphitheatre
7 October 1982	Los Angeles	United States	Universal Amphitheatre
8 October 1982	Los Angeles	United States	Universal Amphitheatre
10 October 1982	Las Vegas	United States	Aladdin Theatre for the Performing Arts
11 October 1982	Las Vegas	United States	Aladdin Theatre for the Performing Arts
12 October 1982	Ogden	United States	Dee Events Center
13 October 1982	Ogden	United States	Dee Events Center
15 October 1982	Tempe	United States	ASU Activity Center
16 October 1982	San Diego	United States	San Diego Sports Arena
20 October 1982	Irvine	United States	Irvine Meadows Amphitheatre
22 October 1982	Irvine	United States	Irvine Meadows Amphitheatre
23 October 1982	Irvine	United States	Irvine Meadows Amphitheatre

=== Box office score data ===
Venue	City	Tickets sold / Available	Gross revenue
The Spectrum	Philadelphia	11,700 / 13,500 (87%)	$156,747
Hartford Civic Center	Hartford	10,433 / 16,000 (65%)	$150,627
CNE Grandstand	Toronto	24,789 / 24,789 (100%)	$327,398
Reunion Arena	Dallas	11,504 / 19,012 (61%)	$166,585
Frank Erwin Center	Austin	12,494 / 14,259 (88%)	$177,267
Murphy Center	Murfreesboro	10,103 / 12,224 (83%)	$137,857
Civic Arena	Pittsburgh	13,131 / 15,000 (88%)	$183,874
Kemper Arena	Kansas City	11,151 / 12,230 (91%)	$159,510
Oakland–Alameda County Coliseum Arena	Oakland	11,951 / 14,500 (82%)	$174,050
Selland Arena	Fresno	6,362 / 7,348 (87%)	$96,382
Recreation Hall	Davis	6,574 / 8,397 (78%)	$99,926
ASU Activity Center	Tempe	8,592 / 14,099 (61%)	$127,950
San Diego Sports Arena	San Diego	8,060 / 11,300 (71%)	$115,878
TOTAL		146,844 / 182,658 (80%)	$2,074,051

== Personnel ==
- Olivia Newton-John – vocals
- Tom Scott – saxophone/musical director
- Carlos Vega – drums
- Rusty Powell - guitars
- Buzz Feiten – guitars
- Michael Landau – guitars
- Robert 'Pops' Popwell – bass guitar
- Kevin Bassinson – keyboards
- David Iwataki – keyboards
- Judi Brown – backing vocals
- Dennis Tufano – backing vocals
- Stephanie Spruill – backing vocals
- Roger Davies – personal management, for Regency Artists, Ltd.
