= Physical (Olivia Newton-John album) =

Studio album by Olivia Newton-John
- Released: 13 October 1981
- Recorded: 21 October 1980 – 22 June 1981
- Studios: David J. Holman Studio, Record One, Ocean Way Recording,
- Genres: Pop; adult contemporary; dance; pop rock
- Length: 38:23
- Label: MCA
- Producer: John Farrar

Olivia Newton-John chronology
Love Performance (1981)	Physical (1981)	Olivia's Greatest Hits Vol. 2 (1982)

Singles from Physical
- 1. "Physical" Released: 28 September 1981; 2. "Make a Move on Me" Released: January 1982; 3. "Landslide" Released: April 1982

Physical is the twelfth studio album by British-Australian singer Olivia Newton-John, released through MCA Records on 13 October 1981. The album was produced and partly written by her long-time record producer John Farrar. Recorded and mixed at David J. Holman's studio in Los Angeles with additional recording at Ocean Way, Physical became one of Newton-John's most controversial and sexual records, and Musically, the album features considerable use of synthesizers, and it explores lyrical themes such as love and relationships, sex and environmental protection. Upon its release, the album was a success but it received positive and mixed reviews from music critics, The album charted high in several countries, including the United States, Japan and Newton-John's native Australia, becoming one of the most successful albums of the early 1980s. It also ranks among the best-selling albums by Australian solo artists, selling more than four million copies worldwide.

The album's title track was a commercial phenomenon, staying 10 weeks atop the Billboard Hot 100, at the time tying the record set by Debby Boone's 1977 single "You Light Up My Life". The song and its music video were controversial, having been banned or edited by several radio stations and television channels (such as MTV) for its sexual references. The single was followed by "Make a Move on Me", another top-ten worldwide hit. "Landslide", which failed to enter the majority of musical charts but reached the top twenty in the United Kingdom, had a music video featuring Newton-John's boyfriend (and later husband) Matt Lattanzi. A video compilation, Olivia Physical, was produced, featuring music videos of all songs from the album. The material was a commercial and critical success, and earned Newton-John a Grammy Award for Video of the Year.

The album was promoted with Newton-John's 1982 North American Physical Tour, performances from which a home video entitled Olivia in Concert was produced. The Physical era marked the height of Newton-John's solo career, gaining her wide acclaim as one of the most successful female artists of the early 1980s.

== Background and development ==
"If these new songs were offered to me a couple of years ago, maybe I wouldn't have attempted them and similarly some of the songs I sang a couple of years ago I wouldn't be interested in doing now. It's a matter of taste and changing. I still know my limitations and wouldn't attempt songs I couldn't do.
I'm not deliberately going after any audience. I'm doing what I like to do. I would have done a country song on Physical if I found one I really liked"

— Newton-John talking about her music style change

In 1978, Olivia Newton-John starred as the female lead, Sandy Olsson, in the musical film Grease, which was a worldwide blockbuster and had a best-selling soundtrack. Before the film, Newton-John was known for country pop and adult contemporary songs. Following the huge success of Grease, and inspired by her character's transformation from goody-goody "Sandy 1" to the sexy, spandex-clad "Sandy 2", she traded her previous musical styles for a sexier and more aggressive pop image. Later that same year, Newton-John released the studio album Totally Hot, and two years later, the Xanadu soundtrack (1980), both with a more pop-oriented style than in her past albums. Physical was recorded and released in 1981, marking the longest gap between Newton-John studio albums at the time; from 1971 to 1978, she recorded at least one studio album per year. Newton-John feared that she could be overexposed with many works released in a short period.

Physical followed Newton-John's new image, perceived as a more sexualized and mature record. It also marked her first studio album without any country tracks. The new music style generated some criticism from the country-music community and Newton-John's old fans. In a Billboard article, she said: "You might lose a few fans but you gain others. You have to do what's comfortable. [...] I've gotten the confidence to be more adventurous whereas in the past I didn't think it was time."

The lead single "Physical" (originally "Let's Get Physical") was written by Terry Shaddick and Newton-John's longtime friend Steve Kipner, and initially was intended for a "macho male rock figure like Rod Stewart", according to Kipner. When Newton-John's then-manager Lee Kramer accidentally heard the demo, he immediately sent the song to her, but initially she didn't want to release the song because it was "too cheeky". It was the first of several Newton-John releases written by Kipner. The songs "Recovery" and "Falling" had been originally featured on John Farrar's 1980 self-titled solo album, but were later remodeled for Physical. The album's eighth track, "Carried Away", was written by Barry Gibb and Albhy Galuten for Barbra Streisand's Guilty album, but Streisand rejected the song, providing Newton-John the chance to record it. The song's original demo, sung by Gibb, was released on The Guilty Demos, released through iTunes in 2006.

Physical was the first Newton-John album to include environmentalism and animal rights themes. Tracks "Silvery Rain", written by The Shadows member Hank Marvin and released as single in 1971 by Cliff Richard, and "The Promise (The Dolphin Song)", a Newton-John-penned song, feature these themes. Newton-John also embraced ecological themes on later albums such as The Rumour and Gaia: One Woman's Journey.

Physical's nature- and sensuality-themed photos were shot primarily in Honolulu, Hawaii by the famous American photographer Herb Ritts in the first half of 1981. Newton-John also filmed the video for "The Promise (The Dolphin Song)" and some takes of Olivia Physical there. The album's cover ranks among the most popular and iconic photos of Newton-John, and as one of Ritts' most popular works. The cover has been compared to that of Madonna's True Blue, also shot by Ritts.

== Composition ==
"As I've gotten older and my influences on music have expanded, I've gotten attracted to different styles"

— Newton-John talking about the music style of Physical

Physical is among Newton-John's most diverse albums, and set her career in a totally different direction. The album was completely produced by Newton-John's longtime collaborator John Farrar, who did a then-modern music production, which later became a musical trend during the 1980s. The songs feature mainly a pop rock sound, with Newton-John singing more high notes than usual during her country pop era. The album contains widespread use of synthesizers, which made it one of Newton-John's most dance-pop-oriented recordings, especially on the songs "Landslide" and "Physical". The vocoder background vocals made by John Farrar also were used, most notably on "Stranger's Touch" and "Recovery". The songs "Carried Away" and "Falling" have a more soft rock sound than Newton-John's past ballads, because of the more extensive use of guitars and synthesizers.

Lyrically, Physical explores themes relating to the behaviour of humans and their relationship with the world around. The songs "Falling" and "Landslide" tell about falling in love and love at first sight. The lyrics of "The Promise (The Dolphin Song)" deal with the killing of dolphins for commercial gain, with sounds of the marine mammal in the background. "Carried Away"'s lyrics talk about a relationship breakup, and "Recovery" tells of a lonely woman who is recovering from a troubled relationship. "Silvery Rain" denounces the aerial application of pesticides. "Love Make Me Strong" tells about the power of love in the determination of a person. The songs "Physical" and "Make a Move on Me" have more sexualized lyrics, with some suggestive innuendos.

== Video album ==
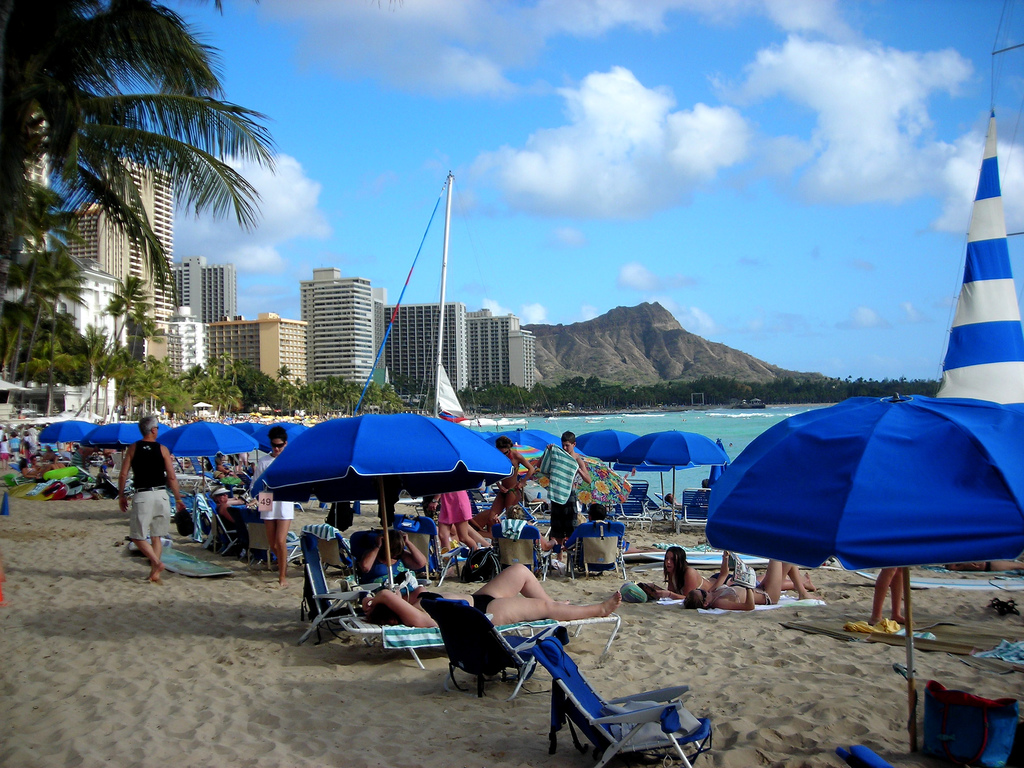
Several scenes from Olivia Physical were shot in Honolulu, Hawaii.

Each song from Physical has its respective music video. All the music videos were filmed for the Physical video album, which was directed by Brian Grant. The recordings were made in late 1981, in London, Honolulu and Newton-John's home at Malibu, California. The songs "Hopelessly Devoted to You", "A Little More Love" and "Magic" (Newton-John hit singles from the 1978 soundtrack Grease, the studio album of the same year, Totally Hot, and the 1980 soundtrack Xanadu, respectively) also had new music videos filmed for the video album. Newton-John's then-boyfriend (now ex-husband) Matt Lattanzi participated for the "Landslide" music video.

The video debuted on 8 February 1982 on ABC as Let's Get Physical and boasted 35% of the United States viewing audience when its first aired. The home video version was released later as Olivia Physical, on VHS, betamax and laserdisc formats by MCA Home Video. The television version has little differences from the home video version. The television version features video interludes starring Newton-John introducing some music videos and the home video version features the music videos for "Love Make Me Strong" and "Falling".

The video was a critical and commercial success, being a Billboard top charting music video for many weeks in 1981, earning a Grammy Award for Video of the Year and a nomination for a Primetime Emmy Award for Outstanding Art Direction for a Variety or Music Program at the 34th Primetime Emmy Awards.

== Promotion ==
The album promotion was made throughout 1981–82, and included several appearances across the world. In the United States, Newton-John performed on the music television series Solid Gold (performing "Physical" and "Make a Move on Me") and at the award show of American Music Awards of 1982 (performing "Make a Move on Me"). She was interviewed on the television shows Good Morning America and The Merv Griffin Show (with the special guests John Travolta, The Carpenters and Rick Springfield). Additionally, Newton-John hosted the seventh season finale of Saturday Night Live, performing "Physical", "Make a Move on Me" and "Landslide".

Newton-John also made performances and interviews to television programs in Japan, Brazil, South Africa (which was controversial because some verses of "Physical" were banned in the country), Venezuela and several countries of Europe. In Canada, the album was promoted in Vic Tanny's health clubs, which offered Physical-thematized club passes and discounts on the album purchase in Capitol-EMI's Mr. Sound stores. At the 24th Grammy Awards, Olivia presented the Record of the Year category, together with Lionel Richie.

=== Singles ===
"Physical" was released as the album lead single on 28 September 1981 by MCA Records. The single is the most successful solo hit of Olivia's career, and became her fifth and final number one single on the Billboard Hot 100. "Physical" stayed for 10 weeks on the top of Hot 100, from 21 November 1981 through 23 January 1982. It was the largest permanence at the time, becoming the most successful song on the Billboard Hot 100 in the 1980s. The song and music video (which was recorded in a gym, with several men working out) were very controversial due to the implied sexual content, being innovative and provocative for the time. It was received positively by critics, with most of them calling it "good-naturedly sexy" and "an eighties gem". It was nominated for a Grammy Award for Best Female Pop Vocal Performance. It was also her tenth and final Number One single in the Netherlands, where she had the most chart-topping singles during her career.

"Make a Move on Me" was released as the album's second single in early 1982. The music video was recorded in the same nightclub that the videos "Stranger's Touch", "Love Make Me Strong" and "Magic" were filmed. It was a worldwide top 10 hit, peaking at five on the Billboard Hot 100, and also going to Number One in Sweden. "Landslide" was released as the third and final single from the album. Although it did not achieve the same success as the previous singles, it reached the top 20 on the UK Singles Chart (where it was the second single and "Make a Move on Me" the third and last single). The song was not performed on the Physical Tour.

=== Tour ===
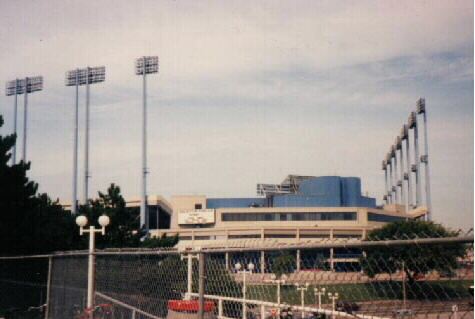
The Physical Tour visited several stadiums and arenas across North America, including the Exhibition Stadium, in Toronto.

The Physical Tour to promote Physical was the fifth concert tour by Newton-John. The tour was announced in July 1982 and began in August of the same year. It was Olivia's first tour in four years, since Totally Hot World Tour and visited only the North American countries United States and Canada. The tour had 64 shows through 40 cities, with a total attendance of 562,428 people. Newton-John friends John Travolta and Karen Carpenter attended some concerts. Jazz musician Tom Scott was the musical director and also served as opening act.

The show consisted of four costume changes and three videos: for introduction, interlude and end credits. The encore consisted of the title song "Physical" (with Newton-John doing aerobic exercises and jumping rope through the performance) and "I Honestly Love You". The tour had generally positive reviews from critics, who praised Newton-John vocal performances and her ability to entertain the audience.

Two concerts in Ogden, Utah (the state where "Physical" was banned by two local radio stations) were filmed for a television special (titled as Olivia: Live in Concert) and a home video release, as Olivia in Concert. The video was nominated for a Grammy Award for Best Long Form Music Video. It was the last concert tour by Newton-John for sixteen years (she originally said that would be her last tour) until The Main Event Tour, in 1998.

== Critical reception ==
Professional ratings
Review scores
Source	Rating
AllMusic	4.5/5 stars
Rolling Stone	3/5 stars

Physical received generally positive and mixed reviews from music critics, Stephen Thomas Erlewine from AllMusic, in a retrospective review written decades after the album's release, gave the album four and a half out of five stars, writing that "Physical was a damn good record, in many ways one of Olivia Newton-John's very best". He further explained "[The album] skillfully balances catchy yet mellow dance cuts with immaculately crafted adult contemporary pop and ballads".

Stephen Holden, in a review for Rolling Stone, said that Physical was "Newton-John's best album to date...a dazzling pop-rock bubblegum production by John Farrar. Newton-John's pert, Barbie-doll vocals boast an extra oomph, while Farrar's exquisite arrangements, with their synthesized frills and Munchkin-like background vocals, gloss Bee Gees buoyancy, Beatles psychedelia and Pointer Sisters pop-funk with virtuosic ease. Physical is a perfect aural milkshake from the Farrah Fawcett of rock."

In their review of the album, Billboard commented that "this album would seem to have everything going for it. Newton-John has reached the top 10 with her last three LPs, Totally Hot and the soundtracks to Grease and Xanadu. She has a red-hot single with the title song, which seems likely to become her fifth No. 1 hit. And the cover art is the most provocative and frankly sexual since the Ohio Players' gatefold covers of the mid-70s. The LP is a mix of midtempo rhythm numbers and pretty ballads. Among the prettiest is "Carried Away," which Barry Gibb cowrote for Barbra Streisand's Guilty album but which didn't make it on the LP."

Cashbox noted that "Lovely Livvy seems to get more sensual and musically bold each successive time out as both the graphics and sound of Physical are downright provocative. Like the Bee Gees' latest work, which features many of the same sessioners, Olivia has gone in a more progressive adult pop direction. Songs like 'Landslide' and 'Strangers' have an almost hard rock intensity, but also possess a pop gloss sheen that make them true Top 40 bait. Credit producer John Farrar for giving the comely Aussie lass a new high tech sound and watch this LP soar up the charts."

The album "Picks and Pans" review published by People also was positive, stating that "This LP impressively completes the transformation that began with her 1979 [sic] album Totally Hot and has turned Newton-John into a much more aggressive, spirited and entertaining singer" and "This is mainly a pop-rock album, though, and it is a first-class production: danceable, listenable and beguiling".

=== Accolades ===
The Physical era received three Grammy Award nominations. The song "Physical" was nominated for a Grammy Award for Best Pop Vocal Performance, Female and the video Olivia Physical won a Grammy Award for Video of the Year at the 25th Grammy Awards. Olivia in Concert, the video recording of the Physical Tour, was nominated for a Grammy Award for Best Video Album at the 26th Grammy Awards. Newton-John won her fourth American Music Award for Favorite Pop/Rock Female Artist at the 10th American Music Awards, making her the biggest winner on that category (tied with Whitney Houston). In 1981, at the time of Physical release, Newton-John was honoured with a Hollywood Walk of Fame for her work in the music industry.

== Commercial performance ==
In the United States, Physical debuted at number sixty-eight and peaked at number six on the Billboard 200, making it the sixth album by Newton-John to reach the top 10 on this chart (and the last, to date). According to Billboard, it was the highest peak for a female singer album in 1982 (tied with Stevie Nicks' Bella Donna). This is Newton-John's only album which entered the Top R&B/Hip-Hop Albums chart, peaking at thirty-two. On the 1982 Billboard Year-End chart, Newton-John appears as the fourth most successful pop artist and Physical as the fifteenth best-selling album of the year. The album remained on the Billboard 200 chart for 57 weeks. For his work with Newton-John, John Farrar was named the pop producer of the year. On 12 October 1984, Physical was certified two times platinum by the Recording Industry Association of America (RIAA) for shipment of over two million units.

In Canada the album debuted at thirty-seven on the RPM Albums Chart. On 30 January 1982 the album reached its peak, the third position. Physical was the twelfth best-selling album of the country in 1982 (and the best-selling by a solo female singer). The album was certified four times platinum by Canadian Recording Industry Association (now Music Canada) for shipment of 400,000 copies. On the UK Albums Chart, the album peaked at number eleven, making the best position for a Newton-John studio album to date. Physical was certified gold by British Phonographic Industry (BPI) on 2 April 1982 (100,000 copies shipped). The album also peaked at top 10 on several charts across the Europe. In Australia (Olivia's native country), Physical peaked at number three on the Kent Music Report albums chart and was one of the 25 best-selling albums of the year. Worldwide the album has sold more than four million copies.

== Re-releases ==
Physical was re-released by MCA Records on 25 October 1990. The album was available on cassette and CD formats without its original booklet. In 1998, the album was re-released in a new digitally remastered edition in Australia by Festival Records, along with many other albums of Newton-John discography. Physical also was re-released on 2 February 2012 in Japan by Universal Music Group. It is available only on a SHM-SACD remastered edition and also as a part of the 2010 box set 40th Anniversary Collection, which was released to celebrate forty years of Newton-John's musical career (the box also contains other re-released albums from her MCA era). Olivia Physical's music videos were re-released on Video Gold 2005 DVD compilation. The live recording Olivia in Concert was re-released on VHS in 1992, and also had a DVD version released in a few Asian countries (there are also several bootleg versions released by small distributors).

On 24 September 2021, Newton-John's official website announced that a deluxe edition of the album would be released on the next October 22, by Primary Wave. The 2xCD deluxe edition features the fully remastered original album, her original tracks from Olivia's Greatest Hits Vol. 2 and Two of a Kind, "Face to Face", as well as alternate versions and B-sides. It also includes a DVD with Physical's video album and Olivia in Concert. The vinyl version became available in May 2022. In addition to standard black vinyl, it was offered in four different coloured vinyl variants at Target, Walmart, Amazon and Urban Outfitters, respectively. Each contained an identical poster, with the exception of Target's edition, which will have its own exclusive poster design.

== Legacy and controversies ==
Newton-John was one of the first artists to invest in music videos. The 1978 album Totally Hot was her first to feature videos accompanying all its singles, but they were very simple, being primarily composed of Newton-John singing in the studio. The music videos for the songs of Physical are more complex, and were some of the first to present a plot line, and not just a video of the artist performing the song. According to Olivia Physical video album director, Brian Grant, Newton-John's record company and management were reluctant about the project: "I suppose there was a little nervousness at first. But, [Olivia] got us out here because she liked what we had done". Newton-John herself was a supporter of the music video industry, as she commented in a Billboard article about the Olivia Physical production:

"I think this is the way albums will go in the future: visuals with the music. I got to be a different personality and play another side of myself."

The record company was also afraid of the public and media feedback about the themes featured on Olivia Physical, especially those included in the music video for the title track. The music video of "Physical" is considered very innovative, with a simple, but cohesive plot, and several sexual innuendos (including homosexual contexts) which are also featured in the song. The music video was a great success and helped the single to be one of the biggest commercial phenomenons of the early 1980s, but also attracted several controversies. After receiving numerous complaints, two Utah local radio stations (Provo's KFMY-FM and Salt Lake City's KSL-FM) banned the song from its playlists. According to a station's program manager "The lyrics are more suggestive than most songs. It goes the one additional step". These were not the only radio stations which banned the song from its playlists. Several adult contemporary radios (many with Mormon affiliations) across North America also banned the single, causing a lower peak at number twenty-nine on the U.S. Adult Contemporary chart. Newton-John usually had a large audience on adult contemporary radio (she has eight number-ones on the U.S. AC chart), but the loss was offset by the massive audience that "Physical" had on pop radio, listened to by a younger audience. Later she recovered the adult contemporary audience with the next single, "Make a Move on Me", which peaked at six on the U.S. AC chart. MTV originally cut the music video ending, because "the beefcakes surrounding Newton-John turned out to be gay".

"Physical" also caused controversies in South Africa. In 1982, Newton-John performed at Bophuthatswana's Sun City Super Bowl and the special appearance was recorded by South African Broadcasting Corporation (SABC). When Olivia was performing the single, the transmission was withdrawn without explanation, but was later reinstated, omitting the verses "There's nothing left to talk about / Unless it's horizontally". According to Billboard, the "committee of moral" of South Africa under apartheid had always employed a policy of restricting airplay on certain material considered "offensive". About all the controversies over the song and its music video, Newton-John stated:

"Five years ago I would have died over a controversy like this. But now I just think it's foolish of them to take it so seriously."

According to Stephen Thomas Erlewine: "'Physical' became such a monster hit – not just a hit, but a pop-culture phenomenon that was impossible to escape – that it became difficult to view its accompanying album as anything other than a conduit for the single". Since its release, Physical has become a remarkable piece of 1980s culture, and has received numerous tributes and citations in several media. The "Physical" performances and its music video popularized the fitness clothing that turned to be a popular fashion style in and out of health clubs, being used by several other artists like Madonna and Kylie Minogue. Among the programs that have made reference to Physical are Late Night with David Letterman (on its pilot episode), Sesame Street, Glee (with Newton-John as a special guest in the season one episode "Bad Reputation"), The Office and The Simpsons.

== Track listing ==
All songs produced by John Farrar, except where noted.

Side one
No.	Title	Writer(s)	Length
1.	"Landslide"	John Farrar	4:27
2.	"Stranger's Touch"	Farrar; Steve Kipner	3:49
3.	"Make a Move on Me"	Farrar; Tom Snow	3:17
4.	"Falling"	Farrar	3:45
5.	"Love Make Me Strong"	Terry Britten; Sue Shifrin	3:10

Side two
No.	Title	Writer(s)	Length
6.	"Physical"	Kipner; Terry Shaddick	3:44
7.	"Silvery Rain"	Hank Marvin	3:39
8.	"Carried Away"	Barry Gibb; Albhy Galuten	3:42
9.	"Recovery"	Farrar; Tom Snow	4:18
10.	"The Promise (The Dolphin Song)"	Olivia Newton-John	4:32
Total length:			38:23

2010 remastered edition – Bonus tracks
No.	Title	Writer(s)	Length
11.	"Heart Attack"	Paul Bliss; Kipner	3:06
12.	"Tied Up"	Farrar; Lee Ritenour	4:21
Total length:			45:45

2021 deluxe edition – Disc one
No.	Title	Writer(s)	Producer(s)	Length
11.	"Landslide" (edited version)			4:03
12.	"Heart Attack"			3:09
13.	"Tied Up" (edited version)			4:13
14.	"Twist of Fate"	Peter Beckett; Kipner	David Foster	3:44
15.	"Livin' in Desperate Times"	Barry Alfonso; Tom Snow	Foster	4:03
16.	"Take a Chance" (with John Travolta)	David Foster; Steve Lukather; Newton-John	Foster	4:09
Total length:				59:00

2021 deluxe edition – Disc two
No.	Title	Writer(s)	Producer(s)	Length
1.	"Tied Up"			4:29
2.	"Shaking You"	Foster; Tom Keane; Paul Gordon	Foster	4:16
3.	"Face to Face" (with Barry Gibb)	Barry Gibb; Maurice Gibb; George Bitzer	Barry Gibb; Karl Richardson	4:15
4.	"Physical" (long version)			7:05
5.	"Falling" (video mix)			3:47
6.	"Carried Away" (alternate mix)			3:46
7.	"Twist of Fate" (alternate mix)			3:45
8.	"(Livin' in) Desperate Times" (soundtrack version)			4:13
9.	"Twist of Fate" (extended version/fade)			5:25
10.	"(Livin' in) Desperate Times" (alternate soundtrack version)			4:03
11.	"Twist of Fate" (extended version/cold ending)			5:34
12.	"(Livin' in) Desperate Times" (extended version)			6:41
13.	"(Livin' in) Desperate Times" (Humberto's alternate mix)			4:47
14.	"Jolene" (live)	Dolly Parton		3:35
15.	"Physical" (live/extended version)			7:31
Total length:				70:32

== Personnel ==
Credits adapted from the album's liner notes.

- Olivia Newton-John – lead and backing vocals
- John Farrar – guitars (1–10), vocoder (1, 2), bass guitar (1–5, 8, 9, 10), backing vocals (2–9), keyboards (3), synthesizers (3, 7)
- Steve Lukather – guitar solo (6), acoustic guitar (8)
- Michael Boddicker – synthesizers (1, 2, 4, 5, 7, 10), acoustic piano (5), vocoder (5), PPG Wave 2 (8)
- Tom Snow – sequencer (3, 9), acoustic piano (8)
- Bill Cuomo – synthesizers (4, 6)
- John Hobbs – Fender Rhodes (8), synthesizers (8)
- David Hungate – bass guitar (6)
- Carlos Vega – drums (1, 2, 3, 5–8, 10), timpani (1), percussion (5, 6)
- Mike Botts – cymbals (4), percussion (7), drums (9)
- Lenny Castro – percussion (6, 9)
- Victor Feldman – marimba (9)
- Gary Herbig – French horn (6)

Production

- John Farrar – producer
- David J. Holman – recording, mixing
- Recorded and mixed at David J. Holman studio – Cactus Studio Hollywood
- William Bowden – engineer
- Doug Sax, Mike Reese – mastering at The Mastering Lab (Los Angeles, California)
- William Bowden, Glenn Aird – 1998 remastering
- Vinny Vero – deluxe edition reissue producer
- Mike Haynes – 2021 remastering at ENSO Mastering

Design

- George Osaki – art direction and design
- Michael Kevin Lee – graphics
- Herb Ritts – photography
- Armando Cosio – hair and makeup
- Fleur Thiemeyer – costume design, wetsuits, wardrobe, stylist

Business

- MCA Records – record label, U.S. copyright owner (1981)
- EMI – record label, U.K. copyright owner (1981)
- Festival Records – record label, Australia copyright owner (1981)
- Universal Music Group – international distributor, record label, international copyright owner (1996)

== Charts ==
=== Weekly charts ===
==== Original release ====
Weekly chart performance for original release of Physical
Chart (1981–1982)	Peak position
Australian Albums (Kent Music Report)	3
Canada Top Albums/CDs (RPM)	3
Dutch Albums (Album Top 100)	9
German Albums (Offizielle Top 100)	30
Italian Albums Chart	13
Japanese Albums (Oricon)	5
New Zealand Albums (RMNZ)	8
Norwegian Albums (VG-lista)	8
Portuguese Albums (Musica & Som)	5
Swedish Albums (Sverigetopplistan)	3
UK Albums (Official Charts)	11
US Billboard 200	6
US Top R&B Albums	32
US Cash Box Top 100 Albums	4

==== 2021 deluxe edition ====
Weekly chart performance for 2021 deluxe edition of Physical
Chart (2021)	Peak position
Australian Artist Albums (ARIA)	13
Scottish Albums (Official Charts)	65
UK Album Downloads Chart (OCC)	85
UK Album Sales Chart (OCC)	73
US Top Album Sales (Billboard)	52
US Top Catalog Albums (Billboard)	17

==== 2022 vinyl reissue ====
Weekly chart performance for 2022 vinyl reissue of Physical
Chart (2022)	Peak position
US Top Album Sales (Billboard)	30
US Vinyl Albums (Billboard)	13

=== Year-end charts ===
Year-end chart performance for Physical
Chart (1982)	Position
Australian Albums Chart	21
Canadian Albums Chart	12
US Billboard 200	15

== Certifications and sales ==
Certifications and sales for Physical
Region	Certification	Certified units/sales
Australia (ARIA)	3× Platinum	150,000
Brazil as of February 1982	—	35,000
Canada (Music Canada)	4× Platinum	400,000^{^}
Hong Kong (IFPI Hong Kong)	Gold	10,000^{*}
Japan	—	200,000
New Zealand (RMNZ)	Gold	7,500^{^}
United Kingdom (BPI)	Gold	100,000^{^}
United States (RIAA)	2× Platinum	2,000,000^{^}
Summaries
Worldwide	—	4,000,000
^{*} Sales figures based on certification alone.^{^} Shipments figures based on certification alone.

== See also ==
- List of Top 25 albums for 1982 in Australia
