= Olivia in Concert =

Video by Olivia Newton-John
- Released: June 1983
- Recorded: October 12–13, 1982
- Venue: Dee Events Center, Weber State University (Ogden, Utah)
- Genre: Concert
- Length: 78 minutes
- Label: MCA Home Video
- Director: Brian Grant
- Producer: Christine Smith

Olivia Newton-John chronology
Olivia Physical (1982)	Olivia in Concert (1983)	Twist of Fate (1983)

Olivia in Concert is a 1983 home video release of a concert by singer Olivia Newton-John. The concert was taped at Dee Events Center, Weber State University in Ogden, Utah on October 12 and 13, 1982, during Olivia's Physical Tour. It originally premiered as a television special on HBO on January 23, 1983. The video charted at No. 15 on Billboard Top Videodisks and was certified gold by the Recording Industry Association of America for shipment of 50,000 units in the United States. The video album was nominated for a Grammy as Best Video Album in 1983.

== Track listing ==
1. "Deeper Than the Night"
2. "Let Me Be There"
3. "Please Mr. Please"
4. "If You Love Me, Let Me Know"
5. "Jolene"
6. "Sam"
7. "Xanadu"
8. "Magic"
9. "Suddenly"
10. "A Little More Love"
11. "Silvery Rain"
12. "Falling"
13. "Heart Attack"
14. "Make a Move on Me"
15. "Hopelessly Devoted to You"
16. "You're the One That I Want"
17. "Physical"
18. "I Honestly Love You"

== Weekly charts ==
Charts (1983)	Peak position
US Video Chart (Billboard)	15

== Production ==
- Costume Design – Fleur Thiemeyer
