= Matt Lattanzi =

American actor and dancer (born 1959)

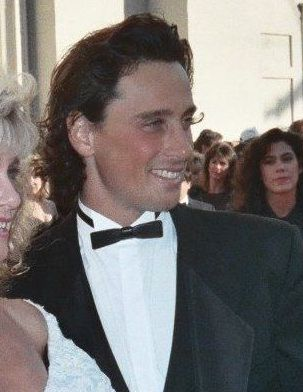
- Lattanzi in 1989
- Born: Matthew Vincent Lattanzi; February 1, 1959 (age 67); Portland, Oregon, U.S.
- Occupation: Actor
- Years active: 1976–1993
- Spouses: Olivia Newton-John (m. 1984; div. 1995) Cindy Jessup (m. 1997; div. 2007)
- Children: Chloe Lattanzi

Matthew Vincent Lattanzi (born February 1, 1959) is an American former actor and dancer. He is most commonly recognized as the ex-husband of singer and actress Olivia Newton-John, and for his acting in films such as My Tutor and the soap opera Paradise Beach.

== Personal life ==
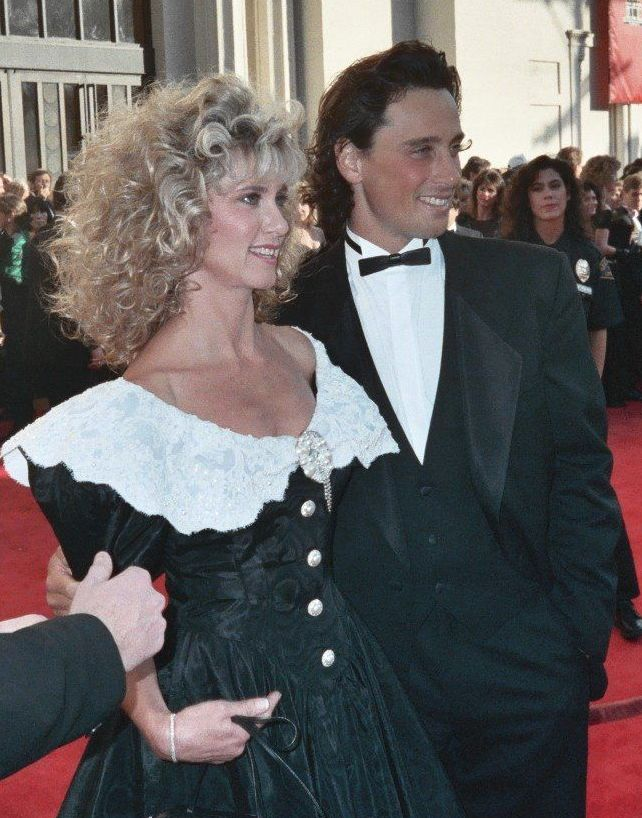
Lattanzi with his first wife Dame Olivia Newton-John at the 61st Academy Awards in 1989

Lattanzi was born and raised in Portland, Oregon, the son of Jeanette (née Slowikowski) and Charles Paul Lattanzi. His father was a maintenance foreman of Italian descent, while his mother is of Polish ancestry. He graduated from Benson Polytechnic High School in 1977.

While filming Xanadu (1980), Lattanzi met Australian singer Olivia Newton-John, whom he married in 1984. The couple had one daughter, Chloe Rose Lattanzi, born on January 17, 1986. Lattanzi and Newton-John moved to their farm in Australia in 1993 so that he could audition for the soap opera, Paradise Beach. He had a six-month contract on the show. By 1994, his acting career was largely over, and he worked as a contractor for a homebuilding company in California.

On April 24, 1995, Lattanzi and Newton-John announced their divorce. From 1997 to 2007, Lattanzi was in a relationship with Cindy Jessup, who had been his and Newton-John's babysitter.

In 2008, Lattanzi briefly appeared in the MTV reality series Rock the Cradle, supporting his daughter Chloe (a contestant on the show). That same year, Lattanzi—a lifelong environmentalist—was reported to be living off the grid near Malibu, California. He now resides in Portland, Oregon.

== Career ==
Lattanzi's feature film debut was as a dancer in the 1980 movie Xanadu.

Lattanzi's career consists mostly of small movie parts, though he did have a starring role in 1983's My Tutor. Other film credits include Rich and Famous, Grease 2, That's Life!, Roxanne, Catch Me If You Can, and Diving In. Lattanzi also had a significant role in the Australian soap opera Paradise Beach, and he appeared in eight of Newton-John's music videos: "Xanadu", "Hollywood Nights", "Gimme Some Lovin'", "Landslide", "Soul Kiss", "Toughen Up", "It’s Always Australia For Me", and "Can't We Talk It Over in Bed".

== Filmography ==
=== Film ===
Year	Title	Role	Notes
1980	Xanadu	Young Danny McGuire / Xanadu Dancer	Feature film
1981	Rich and Famous	Jim	Feature film
1982	Grease 2	Brad	Feature film
1983	My Tutor	Bobby Chrystal	Feature film
1986	That's Life!	Larry Bartlet	Feature film
1987	Roxanne	Trent	Feature film
1988	Blueberry Hill	Denny Logan	Feature film
1989	Catch Me If You Can	Dylan Malone	Feature film
1990	Diving In	Jerome Colter	Feature film

=== Television ===
Year	Title	Role	Notes
1993	Paradise Beach	Cooper Hart	Main cast (100 episodes)

=== Music videos ===
Year	Title	Role	Notes
1980	"Gimme Some Lovin'"	Himself	Music video
1980	"Xanadu"	Himself	Music video
1980	"Hollywood Nights"	Himself	Music video
1981	"Landslide"	Himself	Music video
1982	"Olivia Newton-John: Let's Get Physical"	Himself	TV special (Music video: "Landslide")
1995	"Toughen Up"	Himself	Music video
1986	"Olivia: Soul Kiss"	Himself	Music video: "Soul Kiss"
1988	"It’s Always Australia For Me"	Himself	Music video
1988	"Can't We Talk It Over in Bed"	Himself	Music video
