= The Main Attraction =

The Main Attraction may refer to:

- The Main Attraction (film), a 1962 British drama film
- The Main Attraction (album), a 1976 album by Grant Green, or the title song
- Main Attraction (album), a 1982 album by Suzi Quatro, or the title song
- "Main Attraction", a 2019 song by Jeremy Renner
- "Main Attraction", a song by Quiet Riot from QR III

== See also ==
- The Main Event (disambiguation)
