= Main Event =

Main Event or The Main Event may refer to:

== Film and television ==
- The Main Event (1927 film), directed by William K. Howard
- The Main Event (1938 film), 1938 American comedy-drama film directed by Danny Dare
- The Main Event (1979 film), romantic comedy starring Barbra Streisand and Ryan O'Neal
- The Main Event (2020 film), comedy starring Seth Carr, Tichina Arnold, Ken Marino, and Adam Pally
- Main Event (TV channel), Australia's only pay-per-view channel
- World Wrestling Entertainment television programming, including
  - Saturday Night's Main Event, series airing on NBC (1985–1992, 2006–2008)
  - WWF The Main Event, a Friday night spin-off (1988–1991)
  - WWE Main Event, a current weekly program series launched in 2012
- WCW Main Event, a professional wrestling series airing on TBS (1988–1998)
- The Main Event (Australian game show), Australian television game show that aired from 1991 to 1992 on the Seven Network
- Sky Sports, Main Event, a TV channel

== Music ==
- The Main Event – Live, a 1974 Frank Sinatra recording
- The Main Event (album), the 2000 Fingathing debut
- "The Main Event" (Chamillionaire song), 2010
- The Main Event (1998 concert tour), an Australian concert tour featuring John Farnham, Olivia Newton-John and Anthony Warlow
- The Main Event (2015 concert tour), an American concert tour featuring New Kids on the Block, TLC and Nelly
- "The Main Event/Fight", the 1979 disco song by Barbra Streisand

== Video games ==
- The Main Event (video game), a professional wrestling game released in 1988
- WCW: The Main Event, 1994 game featuring characters from World Championship Wrestling
- Mike Tyson: Main Event, a 2011 iPhone game developed by RockLive featuring boxer, Mike Tyson

== Nicknames ==
- "The Main Event", a nickname of professional wrestler Shawn Michaels
- "Main Event", streetball nickname of basketball player Waliyy Dixon
- The "Main Event", nickname bestowed upon Brian Bagley during the Golden Era of Sinking Spring, PA

== Other uses ==
- Main Event (college basketball), an NCAA tournament
- The Main Event (video), a video, released in 1999, of a tour The Main Event Tour by singers Olivia Newton-John, John Farnham and Anthony Warlow
- Main Event Entertainment, a U.S. chain of entertainment facilities that features bowling, video games, and billiards
- "The Main Event", World Series of Poker annual championship tournament
- "The Main Event", the name of a V8 Supercars event in 2003, later known as the Grand Finale

== See also ==
- Maine Event (born 1990), American rapper
