= Olivia Physical =

Video by Olivia Newton-John
- Released: February 8, 1982
- Recorded: 1978–1982
- Genre: Music video
- Length: 54 minutes
- Label: MCA Home Video
- Director: Brian Grant
- Producer: Olivia Newton-John, Scott Millaney, John Farrar

Olivia Newton-John chronology
Olivia Physical (1982)	Olivia in Concert (1983)

Olivia Physical is a 1982 video collection featuring the singer Olivia Newton-John and various of her songs, most from the album Physical. A somewhat expanded version of the video was aired as an ABC prime-time television special, Let's Get Physical, which was in the top 10 of the Nielsen ratings. In 1983 the video received a Grammy Award as Video of the Year.

== Legacy ==
Newton-John was one of the first artists to invest in music videos. The 1978 album Totally Hot was her first one to features videos accompanying all the singles from the album, but they were very simple, being primarily composed of Newton-John singing in the studio. The music videos of the songs on Physical are more complex, and were some of the first to present a plot line, and not just a video of the artist performing the song. According to Olivia Physical video album director, Brian Grant, Newton-John's record company and management were reluctant about the project at first: "I suppose there was a little nervousness at first. But, [Olivia] got us out here because she liked what we had done". Newton-John herself was a supporter of the music video industry, as she commented in a Billboard article about the Olivia Physical production:

"I think this is the way albums will go in the future: visuals with the music. I got to be a different personality and play another side of myself."

== Track listing ==
No.	Title	Director(s)	Length
1.	"Landslide"	Brian Grant	4:27
2.	"Magic" (from the motion picture Xanadu)	Grant	4:31
3.	"Physical"	Grant	3:44
4.	"Carried Away"	Grant	3:43
5.	"A Little More Love" (from the album Totally Hot)	Grant	3:27
6.	"Recovery"	Grant	4:18
7.	"The Promise (The Dolphin Song)"	Grant	4:33
8.	"Love Make Me Strong"	Grant	3:10
9.	"Stranger's Touch"	Grant	3:49
10.	"Make a Move on Me"	Grant	3:17
11.	"Falling"	Grant	3:45
12.	"Silvery Rain"	Grant	3:39
13.	"Hopelessly Devoted to You" (from the motion picture Grease)	Grant	3:05
14.	"Credits"		0:51

Note

- The television version has little differences from the home video version. The television version features video interludes starring Olivia, introducing some music videos. The home video version does not, but it features the music videos for "Love Make Me Strong" and "Falling", which were not part of the television version.

== Production ==
- Fleur Thiemeyer – costume design, wardrobe, styling
