= Burna =

Burna may refer to:

== People ==
- Burnaburiash I, (c. 1500 BC), Babylonian king
- Burna-Buriash II (reigned 1359–1333 BC), Babylonian King
- Burna Boy (born 1990), Nigerian musician
- Jay Burna (born 1989), American hip hop recording artist
- L-Burna (Layzie Bone, born 1974), American rapper
- Mama Burna, mother and manager of Burna Boy
- Tel Burna, an archaeological site in Israel

== Places ==
- Burna, Kentucky, an American community
- Burnas Lagoon, a marine lagoon in Ukraine
