= Maine Event =

American rapper

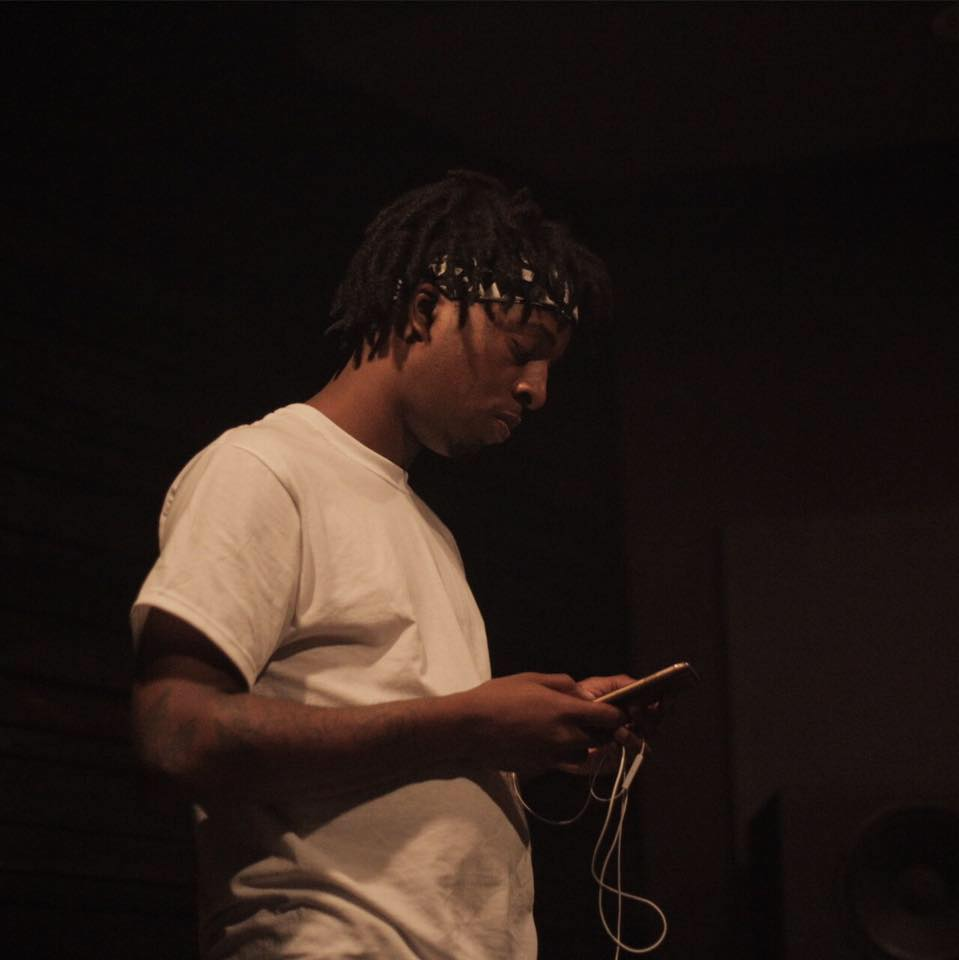
- Maine Event in studio

Background information
- Born: Jermaine Lewis; March 18, 1990 (age 36); Fort Lauderdale, Florida, United States
- Genres: Hip hop, R&B
- Occupations: Artist, Songwriter, Composer
- Instrument: Vocals
- Years active: 2008–present
- Label: Black Congress Music Group
- Website: www.maineeventbcmg.com

Jermaine Lewis (born March 18, 1990), better known by his stage name Maine Event, is an American rapper and songwriter from Fort Lauderdale, Florida. Maine is best known for his 2015 single "441" featuring Jay Burna and his multiple mixtape releases underground.

== Biography ==
Jermaine Lewis was born on March 18, 1990, in Fort Lauderdale, Florida, and is of Jamaican descent. He grew up the youngest of four children to his mother but only the middle child to his father. His mother, who moved to America before he was born, use to send him as a kid to often stay with his father who was a local business man in Santa Cruz, Jamaica.

He is also related to former Tom Tom Club band member Mystic Bowie.

== Music ==
Maine Event released his first mixtape in 2008 through his Black Congress Music Group imprint.

In November 2015 he released his latest mixtape, Now Or Never: Chapter 2.

He just dropped a new single titled "Shinobi" feat Ali Coyote & Jay Burna
