= Totally Hot (song) =

Single by Olivia Newton-John

from the album Totally Hot
- B-side: "Dancin' 'Round and 'Round"
- Released: March 1979 (EU); July 1979 (US)
- Recorded: June–July 1978
- Length: 3:14
- Label: MCA
- Songwriter: John Farrar
- Producer: John Farrar

Olivia Newton-John singles chronology
"Deeper Than the Night" (1979)	"Totally Hot" (1979)	"I Can't Help It" (1980)

"Totally Hot" is a song recorded by British-Australian singer Olivia Newton-John. It was released as the third US single from her 1978 tenth studio album of the same name, and reached number 52 on the US Billboard Hot 100 and number 92 on the Canadian RPM Top Singles chart.

"Totally Hot" was released as a double-A sided single in the United States and "Dancin' 'Round and 'Round" was sent to country radio, peaking at number 29 on the Hot Country Songs chart.

== Track listing ==
All tracks produced by John Farrar.

- Recorded and mixed by David J. Holman
1. "Totally Hot" (Farrar) – 3:14
2. "Dancin' 'Round and 'Round" (Adam Mitchell) – 4:00

== Charts ==
Chart performance for "Totally Hot"
Chart (1979)	Peak position
Belgium (Ultratop 50 Flanders)	16
Canada Top Singles (RPM)	92
Netherlands (Single Top 100)	46
US Billboard Hot 100	52
US Cash Box Top 100	72
Quebec (ADISQ)	38

Chart performance for "Dancin' 'Round and 'Round"
Chart (1979)	Peak position
US Billboard Hot 100	82
US Adult Contemporary (Billboard)	25
US Hot Country Songs (Billboard)	29
US Cash Box Country Singles	27
Canada Country Singles (RPM)	24
Canada Adult Contemporary (RPM)	1
