= Soul Kiss (song) =

1985 single by Olivia Newton-John

Single by Olivia Newton-John

from the album Soul Kiss
- B-side: "Electric"
- Released: 25 September 1985
- Genre: Synthpop
- Length: 4:32
- Label: MCA
- Songwriter: Mark Goldenberg
- Producer: John Farrar

Olivia Newton-John singles chronology
"Take a Chance" (1984)	"Soul Kiss" (1985)	"Toughen Up" (1986)

"Soul Kiss" is a song recorded by English-born Australian singer Olivia Newton-John for her twelfth studio album, Soul Kiss (1985). It was released as the lead single from the album on 25 September 1985 by MCA Records. The song was produced by John Farrar and written by Mark Goldenberg. Katey Sagal is featured as a backing vocalist on the song.

== Personnel ==
- Olivia Newton-John – vocals
- Mark Goldenberg – synthesizers
- Greg Phillinganes – synthesizers
- John Farrar – Synclavier, guitars
- Larry Carlton – guitars
- Vinnie Colaiuta – drums
- Michael Fisher – percussion
- Katey Sagal – backing vocals

== Charts ==
Chart performance for "Soul Kiss"
Chart (1985–1986)	Peak position
Australia (Kent Music Report)	20
Canada Top Singles (RPM)	21
Canada Adult Contemporary (RPM)	17
European Airplay (European Hit Radio)	24
Israel (Israeli Singles Chart)	30
Netherlands (Single Top 100)	38
Quebec (ADISQ)	14
UK Singles (Official Charts)	100
US Billboard Hot 100	20
US Cash Box Top Singles	20
US Adult Contemporary (Billboard)	20
US Dance Singles Sales (Billboard)	28
