= Physical (Olivia Newton-John song) =

1981 single by Olivia Newton-John

Single by Olivia Newton-John

from the album Physical
- B-side: "The Promise (The Dolphin Song)"
- Released: 28 September 1981
- Recorded: June 1981
- Genre: Dance-pop; post-disco
- Length: 3:44
- Label: EMI (UK); MCA (US)
- Songwriters: Steve Kipner; Terry Shaddick
- Producer: John Farrar

Olivia Newton-John singles chronology
| "Suddenly" (1980) | "Physical" (1981) | "Make a Move on Me" (1982) |

Music videos
- "Physical" on YouTube

"Physical" is a song recorded by British-Australian singer Olivia Newton-John for her 1981 eleventh studio album of the same name. It was released as the album's lead single in 1981. The song was produced by John Farrar and written by Steve Kipner and Terry Shaddick, who had originally intended to offer it to Rod Stewart. The song had also been offered to Tina Turner by her manager Roger Davies, but when Turner declined, Davies gave the song to Newton-John, another of his clients.

"Physical" was an immediate smash hit, shipping two million copies in the United States, where it was certified platinum by the Recording Industry Association of America (RIAA). The song spent 10 consecutive weeks at number one on the Billboard Hot 100, which tied the record of most consecutive weeks at number one at the time, and became the longest-running number-one single by an Australian artist on the Billboard charts to date. The song's suggestive lyrics, which even caused it to be banned in some markets, helped change Newton-John's longstanding clean-cut image, replacing it with a sexy, assertive persona that was strengthened with follow-up hits such as "Make a Move on Me", "Twist of Fate" and "Soul Kiss".

== Background and recording ==
"Physical" (originally "Let's Get Physical") was written by Terry Shaddick and Newton-John's longtime friend Steve Kipner, and initially was intended for a "macho male rock figure like Rod Stewart", according to Kipner. When Newton-John's then manager Lee Kramer accidentally heard the demo, he immediately sent the song to her, and she became interested in recording it. Newton-John recalled that she later had misgivings about the song because of its innuendos and asked that the song be pulled from release. However, she was told it was too late and the song was already performing well on the charts.

The song's guitar solo was performed by Steve Lukather of the American rock band Toto. "Physical" is written in the key of E minor with Newton-John's vocal range spanning from A3 to E5.

== Reception ==
"Physical" was described by Mark Ellen of Smash Hits as "one of the most successful career-revivers in living memory". It is the most successful single of Newton-John's career and became her fifth (and last) number-one single on the US Billboard Hot 100. "Physical" stayed for 10 weeks on the top of Hot 100, from 21 November 1981 through 23 January 1982, out of a total of 26 weeks on the chart. It was the largest permanence at the time, becoming the most successful song on the Billboard in the 1980s. The song was very controversial due to the implied sexual content, being innovative and somewhat provocative for the time.

"Physical" has received positive reviews from music critics since release, with some of them calling it "good-naturedly sexy" and "an eighties gem". Record World attributed its success to a "big pounding beat and the lusty idea of Olivia getting physical." The song won a Grammy Award for Video of the Year and won the Billboard Award for Top Pop Single.

== Chart performance ==
"Physical" rose to number one on the US Billboard Hot 100 in November 1981 and stayed there for 10 weeks (the most of any single in the 1980s), remaining until the second half of January 1982. It reached number two on the Radio & Records CHR/Pop Airplay chart on 27 November 1981, staying there for two weeks and remaining on the chart for 14 weeks. In terms of chart placement, "Physical" was Newton-John's most successful single in the United States, and her final single to reach the top spot. Billboard ranked the song as the number-one single of 1982 (since the chart year for 1982 actually began in November 1981). In Canada, the song was number one for five weeks beginning 19 December 1981, was on the top 50 charts for 26 weeks, and was her sixth number-one song.

"Physical" was both preceded and followed in the number-one chart position by recordings by American duo Hall & Oates: "Private Eyes" was dethroned by "Physical" in November 1981 and "Physical" was supplanted by "I Can't Go for That (No Can Do)" the following January. "Physical" held Foreigner's "Waiting for a Girl Like You" at number two on the Hot 100 for nine weeks and "I Can't Go for That (No Can Do)" then held Foreigner at number two for a tenth and final consecutive week. "Physical" remained in the top ten for a total of 15 weeks, thus making it the longest run of 1981, as well as tying it for the longest run of the decade among number-one singles. "Physical" also peaked at number 28 on the Hot Soul Singles chart.

"Physical" achieved great success around the world, reaching number seven in the United Kingdom, where it was certified silver. However, the song was censored and even banned by some radio stations as a result of its sexually suggestive content, such as the line "There's nothing left to talk about, unless it's horizontally".

Also, the line "Let me hear your body talk" caused some radio stations to ban the song.

== Music video ==
=== Synopsis ===
The controversial music video that was released to promote the single featured Newton-John in a gym with well-built men in the last half. Some of the scenes have sexual subtext, such as the shower scene or when Newton-John rubs herself on the men.

The accompanying music video for "Physical", directed by Brian Grant, features Newton-John in a tight leotard trying to make several overweight men lose weight. The men fail comically and Newton-John leaves the room to take a shower. When the men work out on their own, they suddenly transform into muscular, attractive men. A stylistic shot shows one muscular man glancing at his overweight self in a mirror. Newton-John is shocked when she returns and starts to flirt with them. Two of the men secretly go out, holding hands, implying they are gay. This surprises Newton-John, as does the sight of two more of the men leaving with their arms around each other. Finally, she finds that the last of the overweight men is heterosexual and they go off to play tennis together.

=== Reception ===
The Olivia Physical music video collection, which contained "Physical", won a Grammy Award for Video of the Year in 1983. The video was featured on VH1's Pop-Up Video and was the first video to air on Beavis and Butt-Head.

== Legacy and other versions ==
Billboard ranked "Physical" number six on its "All Time Top 100" list, number one on its "Top 50 Sexiest Songs of All Time" list, and number one on its "Top 100 Songs of the 1980s" list.

A revamped bossa nova version of the song was released on the 2002 Newton-John album (2) as a bonus track, and this version replaced the original in Newton-John's tours. Her duet with Jane Lynch was included in the episode "Bad Reputation" of the television series Glee. This version peaked at number 89 on the Billboard Hot 100 in May 2010.

The song's chorus is interpolated in the song "Kiss Me More" by Doja Cat featuring SZA (2021), and is also interpolated in the song "Mystical Magical" by Benson Boone (2025).

For the 45th anniversary of the release of the single, a limited-edition 7" single was pressed on "Coke-bottle" clear vinyl (2026).

== Personnel ==
From the Physical album's liner notes:

- Olivia Newton-John – lead and backing vocals
- John Farrar – guitar, backing vocals
- Steve Lukather – guitar solo
- David Hungate – bass
- Bill Cuomo – Prophet 5
- Robert Blass – keyboards
- Carlos Vega – drums, percussion
- Lenny Castro – percussion
- Gary Herbig – horns
- David J. Holman – Recorded and mixed
- Recorded at David J. Holman studio [Laurel Canyon]

== Charts ==
=== Weekly charts ===
Weekly chart performance for "Physical"
| Chart (1981–1982) | Peak position |
|---|---|
| Australia (Kent Music Report) | 1 |
| Austria (Ö3 Austria Top 40) | 7 |
| Belgium (Ultratop 50 Flanders) | 1 |
| Canada Top Singles (RPM) | 1 |
| European Singles (Europarade) | 2 |
| Finland (Suomen virallinen lista) | 14 |
| Ireland (IRMA) | 4 |
| Israel (Israeli Singles Chart) | 11 |
| Italy (Musica e dischi) | 9 |
| Netherlands (Dutch Top 40) | 4 |
| Netherlands (Single Top 100) | 6 |
| Luxembourg (Radio Luxembourg) | 5 |
| New Zealand (Recorded Music NZ) | 1 |
| Portugal (Musica & Som) | 2 |
| Quebec (ADISQ) | 1 |
| South Africa (Springbok Radio) | 11 |
| Spain (AFYVE) | 16 |
| Sweden (Sverigetopplistan) | 15 |
| Switzerland (Schweizer Hitparade) | 1 |
| UK Singles (Official Charts) | 7 |
| US Billboard Hot 100 | 1 |
| US Dance Club Songs (Billboard) | 22 |
| US Hot Soul Singles (Billboard) | 28 |
| US Cash Box Top 100 | 1 |
| West Germany (GfK) | 4 |
| Zimbabwe (ZIMA) | 1 |

| Chart (2010) | Peak position |
|---|---|
| US Billboard Hot 100 Glee Cast featuring Olivia Newton-John | 89 |

| Chart (2022) | Peak position |
|---|---|
| Canada Digital Song Sales (Billboard) | 41 |
| Japan Hot Overseas (Billboard Japan) | 19 |
| US Digital Song Sales (Billboard) | 30 |
| UK Singles Downloads (Official Charts) | 31 |

=== Year-end charts ===
Annual chart rankings for "Physical"
| Chart (1981) | Position |
|---|---|
| Australia (Kent Music Report) | 29 |
| Belgium (Ultratop 50 Flanders) | 29 |
| Canada Top Singles (RPM) | 51 |
| Italy (Musica e dischi) | 98 |
| Netherlands (Dutch Top 40) | 22 |
| Netherlands (Single Top 100) | 31 |
| Switzerland (Schweizer Hitparade) | 14 |
| US Cash Box Top 100 | 6 |

| Chart (1982) | Position |
|---|---|
| Australia (Kent Music Report) | 78 |
| Canada Top Singles (RPM) | 15 |
| Italy (Musica e dischi) | 68 |
| US Billboard Hot 100 | 1 |
| West Germany (Official German Charts) | 61 |

=== Decade-end charts ===
1980s chart rankings
| Chart (1980–1989) | Position |
|---|---|
| US Billboard Hot 100 | 1 |

=== All-time charts ===
All-time chart rankings for "Physical"
| Chart | Position |
|---|---|
| US Billboard Hot 100 (1958-2021) | 11 |
| US Billboard Hot 100 (Women) | 2 |

== Certifications and sales ==
| Region | Certification | Certified units/sales |
|---|---|---|
| Australia (ARIA) | Platinum | 100,000^{^} |
| Canada (Music Canada) | 2× Platinum | 200,000^{^} |
| Japan | — | 200,000 |
| New Zealand (RMNZ) | Gold | 10,000^{*} |
| United Kingdom (BPI) | Silver | 250,000^{^} |
| United States (RIAA) | Platinum | 2,000,000^{^} |
^{*} Sales figures based on certification alone.^{^} Shipments figures based on certification alone.

== See also ==
- List of Billboard Hot 100 number ones of 1981
- List of Billboard Hot 100 number ones of 1982
- List of number-one singles from the 1980s (New Zealand)
- List of number-one singles in Australia during the 1980s
- List of number-one singles of 1981 (Canada)
- List of number-one singles of 1982 (Canada)
- List of number-one singles of the 1980s (Switzerland)
