= The Rumour (album) =

1988 studio album by Olivia Newton-John

Studio album by Olivia Newton-John
- Released: 2 August 1988
- Studios: Ocean Way Recording, Sunset Sound, Kren Studio and The Grey Room (Hollywood, California); Skyline Recording (Topanga, California); Ground Control Studios, California Phase Studios and Studio 55 (Los Angeles, California); Avatar Studios (Malibu, California); Right Track Recording and Skyline Studios (New York City, New York)
- Genre: Pop
- Length: 40:42
- Label: Mercury
- Producers: Elton John; James Newton Howard; Davitt Sigerson; Hank Medress; Sandy Linzer; Randy Goodrum

Olivia Newton-John chronology
Soul Kiss (1985)	The Rumour (1988)	Warm and Tender (1989)

Singles from The Rumour
- 1. "The Rumour" Released: August 1988; 2. "Can't We Talk It Over in Bed" Released: 1988

Professional ratings
Review scores
Source	Rating
AllMusic	2/5 stars
Rolling Stone	3/5 stars

The Rumour is the fourteenth studio album by Olivia Newton-John on 2 August 1988. The title track was written by Elton John and Bernie Taupin and features backing vocals and piano by John. The album featured the singles "The Rumour", "Can't We Talk It Over in Bed" (originally recorded by Grayson Hugh, whose version was released after Newton-John's) and the Australian-only promo-single "It's Always Australia for Me", which was released for the Australian Bicentenary in 1988. This was also her first album not produced by long-time producer John Farrar.

== Background ==
The Rumour features the return of Olivia Newton-John after a two-year break due to the birth of her daughter Chloe Lattanzi in 1986. It has a careful production with the collaboration of some well-known songwriters, but it was a commercial failure. It marks a notable decline in Newton-John's popularity, being her lowest charting since If Not for You in 1971. It was her last studio album via Mercury.

This album was praised by critics as more mature, with Newton-John addressing topics such as AIDS ("Love and Let Live"), the environment and single-parent households.

== Reception ==
Rolling Stone, noted that "it's a bit of a jolt to hear Olivia Newton-John sing about AIDS, single parenthood and a better environment. It's as if, now that she's forty and a first-time mother herself, she suddenly cares about the world. Just as surprisingly, she connects with rock producer Davitt Sigerson's unsweetened settings and delivers believable, unstrained conviction, whether she's championing a cause, romping through the title cut or exposing a vein or two...For fifteen years, Olivia Newton-John has been one of pop music's prettiest faces; now she just wants a little respect, and with The Rumour she earns it."

In their review of the album, Billboard commented that "the woman who once revived her career with a double-entendre invitation to "get physical" now asks "Can't We Talk It Over In Bed." Project doesn't rely solely on flirtation, however. Ever-changing Newton-John has a sound perfectly packaged for the late '80s; leadoff title single, featuring Elton John, is off to a nice start.

Cashbox called it "her best album in years," commenting that "one of the world's favorite songbirds returns from an extended hiatus with an album that explores the many sides of love in a refreshingly adult manner. The first single is "The Rumour," an Elton John/Bernie Taupin composition that recalls Elton's bouncy, piano hits of the '70s (and which will probably lead to a lot of guessing about what "the rumour" really is). Another noteworthy cut is "Love and Let Live," a safe-sex anthem."

== Track listing ==
Standard edition
No.	Title	Writer(s)	Producer(s)	Length
1.	"The Rumour"	Elton John; Bernie Taupin	John; James Newton Howard	3:55
2.	"Love and Let Live"	Alan O'Day	Davitt Sigerson	3:25
3.	"Can't We Talk It Over in Bed"	Irwin Levine; Sandy Linzer	Hank Medress; Linzer	3:53
4.	"Let's Talk About Tomorrow"	John Capek; Amy Sky; Olivia Newton-John	Sigerson	3:18
5.	"It's Not Heaven"	Randy Goodrum; Newton-John	Sigerson; Goodrum^{[a]}	3:58
6.	"Get Out"	Goodrum; Newton-John	Sigerson	3:55
7.	"Big and Strong"	Mark Heard	Sigerson	4:32
8.	"Car Games"	Goodrum; Newton-John	Sigerson; Goodrum^{[a]}	4:45
9.	"Walk Through Fire"	David Baerwald; David Ricketts	Sigerson	5:30
10.	"Tutta La Vita"	Lucio Dalla; Sigerson	Sigerson	3:31

Australian edition
No.	Title	Writer(s)	Producer(s)	Length
6.	"It's Always Australia for Me"	Capek; Newton-John	Sigerson	3:19
7.	"Get Out"	Goodrum; Newton-John	Sigerson	3:55
8.	"Big and Strong"	Heard	Sigerson	4:32
9.	"Car Games"	Goodrum; Newton-John	Sigerson; Goodrum^{[a]}	4:45
10.	"Walk Through Fire"	Baerwald; Ricketts	Sigerson	5:30
11.	"Tutta La Vita"	Dalla; Sigerson	Sigerson	3:31

Japan 2010 SHM-CD bonus track(s)
No.	Title	Writer(s)	Producer(s)	Length
11.	"Winter Angel"	Newton-John; Sky	Sigerson	3:40
12.	"It's Always Australia for Me"	Capek; Newton-John	Sigerson	3:19

Notes

- ^{^[a]} denotes a co-producer

== Personnel ==
Performers and musicians

- Olivia Newton-John – lead vocals, backing vocals (1, 2, 4, 7–10)
- Elton John – digital piano (1), backing vocals (1)
- James Newton Howard – additional keyboards (1), additional synthesizers (1), drum programming (1)
- John Philip Shenale – keyboards (2, 4–10), programming (2, 4, 5, 7–10)
- Bob Thiele Jr. – keyboards (2), programming (2)
- Charles Giordano – keyboards (3)
- John Sheard – keyboards (3)
- John Capek – keyboards (4), programming (4), synthesizer arrangements (4)
- Billy Meyers – string arrangements (4, 7), keyboards (7), programming (7)
- Randy Goodrum – keyboards (5, 8), programming (5, 6, 8), arrangements (5)
- Mark Heard – keyboards (7), programming (7), guitars (7)
- Leon Ware – keyboards (8), programming (8), backing vocals (8)
- David Ricketts – keyboards (9), programming (9)
- Davey Johnstone – guitars (1)
- Dann Huff – guitars (2)
- Jerry Friedman – guitars (3)
- Michael Landau – guitars (4–8)
- Jimmy Rip – guitars (4, 6, 10)
- Jef Scott – guitars (9, 10), backing vocals (10)
- David Baerweld – guitars (9), bass guitar (9)
- Neil Stubenhaus – bass guitar (1)
- Davey Faragher – bass guitar (2), backing vocals (2)
- Jason Scheff – bass guitar (7, 8), backing vocals (7)
- Abraham Laboriel – bass guitar (10)
- Carlos Vega – drum overdubs (1)
- Ed Greene – drums (2, 4–10)
- Lenny Castro – percussion (1)
- Paulinho da Costa – percussion (4, 5, 7–10)
- Kim Hutchcroft – baritone saxophone (1)
- Gary Herbig – tenor saxophone (1)
- Dan Higgins – tenor saxophone (1)
- Gerald Albright – saxophone (6)
- Lincoln Adler – saxophone (8)
- Lew McCreary – trombone (1)
- Bill Reichenbach Jr. – trombone (1)
- Gary Grant – trumpet (1)
- Jerry Hey – trumpet (1)
- Chuck Findley – trumpet (6, 10)
- Tommy Morgan – harmonica (6)
- Bruce Roberts – backing vocals (1)
- Janis Liebhart – backing vocals (2)
- Davitt Sigerson – backing vocals (2, 10)
- Amy Sky – backing vocals (4, 10)
- Tom Keane – backing vocals (7)
- Julia Waters Tillman – backing vocals (9)
- Luther Waters – backing vocals (9)
- Maxine Waters Willard – backing vocals (9)
- Oren Waters – backing vocals (9)
- Ned Albright – backing vocals (10)
- Steven Soles – backing vocals (10)

Technical

- Jack Joseph Puig – engineer (1)
- Ross Pallone – engineer (1), mixing (1)
- Bob Schaper – engineer (1)
- John Beverly Jones – engineer (2, 4–10), mixing (5–9)
- Brian Malouf – mixing (2, 4, 10)
- Bill Schenman – engineer (3)
- Allen Sides – string recording (4, 8)
- Mike Klouster – recording assistant (1)
- Michael Mason – recording assistant (1)
- Martin Schmeizie – recording assistant (1)
- Ted Blaisdell – recording assistant (2–4, 6–8, 10)
- Jim Dineen – recording assistant (2–4, 6–8, 10)
- Ken Felton – recording assistant (2–4, 6–8, 10)
- Mitch Zelezry – recording assistant (2–4, 6–8, 10)
- Randy Goodrum – recording assistant (5, 9)
- Stephen Marcussen – mastering at Precision Mastering (Hollywood, California)
- Shari Sutcliffe – production coordinator (1)
- Steve Rosen – production coordinator (3)
- Jeff Adamoff – art direction, design
- Michael Diehl – art direction, design
- Herb Ritts – photography

== Charts ==
Chart performance for The Rumour
Chart (1988)	Peak position
Australian Albums (ARIA)	30
Canada Top Albums/CDs (RPM)	94
Dutch Albums (Album Top 100)	96
Japanese Albums (Oricon)	31
US Billboard 200	67
US Cash Box Top Albums	120

== Olivia Down Under video ==
Olivia Down Under

Video by Olivia Newton-John
- Released: 1989
- Recorded: 1988
- Genre: Music video
- Length: 60 minutes
- Label: PolyGram
- Director: Brian Grant
- Producer: Paul Raphael

Olivia Newton-John chronology
Soul Kiss (1985)	Olivia Down Under (1989)	The Main Event (1999)

Olivia Down Under is a compilation of music and clips from the album The Rumour released in 1989, featuring Newton-John performing songs from The Rumour against a backdrop of Australian scenery. For the special, Newton-John was nominated for a CableACE Award for Performance in a Music Special in 1989.

=== Contents ===
- "Tutta La Vita"
- "Click Go the Shears"
- "Walk Through Fire"
- "Old Fashioned Man"
- "Let's Talk About Tomorrow"
- "Winter Angel"
- "Get Out"
- "Big and Strong"
- "Love and Let Live"
- "Australia for Me"
- "The Rumour"
