= Grammy Award for Video of the Year =

Honor awarded to recording artists in 1982 and 1983 for music videos

- Awarded for: Quality music videos
- Country: United States
- Presented by: National Academy of Recording Arts and Sciences
- First award: 1982
- Final award: 1983
- Website: grammy.com

The Grammy Award for Video of the Year was an honor presented to recording artists at the 24th Grammy Awards in 1982 and the 25th Grammy Awards in 1983 for music videos. The Grammy Awards, an annual ceremony that was established in 1958 and originally called the Gramophone Awards, are presented by the National Academy of Recording Arts and Sciences of the United States to "honor artistic achievement, technical proficiency and overall excellence in the recording industry, without regard to album sales or chart position".

First presented in 1982 to Michael Nesmith for Elephant Parts, the award was reserved for quality "video cassettes or discs in any format created specifically for the home video market". In 1983, Olivia Newton-John was presented the award for Olivia Physical. Beginning with the 1984 Grammy Awards, the Video of the Year award category was replaced with the categories Best Video, Short Form and Best Video Album (now known as Best Music Video and Best Music Film, respectively).

== Recipients ==
Year	Video	Artist(s)
1982
1982	Elephant Parts	Michael Nesmith
1982	Eat to the Beat	Blondie; Paul Flattery, producer; David Mallet, director
1982	The First National Kidisc	Bruce Seth Green
1982	One Night Stand: A Keyboard Event	Eubie Blake
1983
1983	Olivia Physical	Olivia Newton-John
1983	Fun and Games	Various Artists; Margaret Murphy, producer
1983	The Tales of Hoffmann	The Royal Opera; Georges Prêtre, Plácido Domingo, conductors
1983	The Tubes Video	The Tubes; Russell Mulcahy, director
1983	Visions: Elton John	Elton John; Russell Mulcahy, director

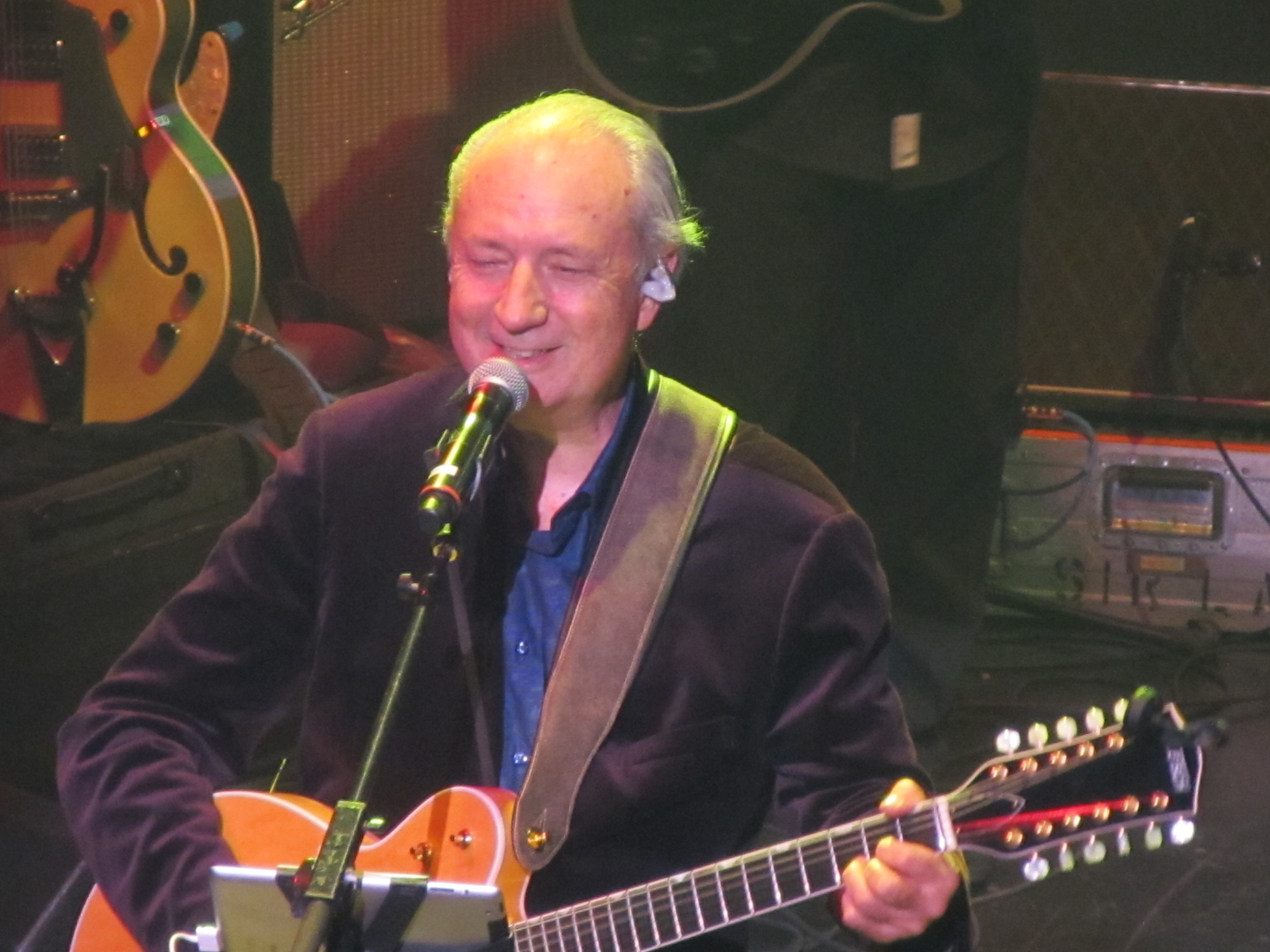
Michael Nesmith performing in 2012

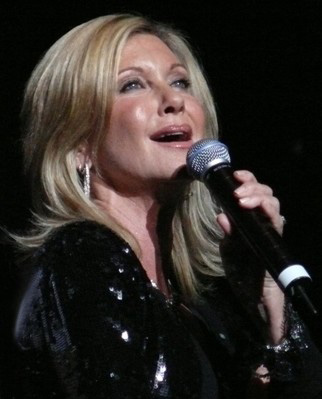
1983 award winner Olivia Newton-John performing in Sydney in 2008

Nominees for the 24th Grammy Awards (1982), Video of the Year included: Eubie Blake for One Night Stand: A Keyboard Event, the band Blondie for Eat to the Beat, Bruce Seth Green for the participative video collection of puzzles and games known as The First National Kidisc, and Michael Nesmith, former member of The Monkees, for the hour-long video Elephant Parts (also known as Michael Nesmith in Elephant Parts). One Night Stand was a recording of a jazz program billed as "an evening of all-stars" at Carnegie Hall, with appearances by Kenny Barron, Arthur Blythe, George Duke, Herbie Hancock, Roland Hanna, Bobby Hutcherson and ten other musicians. Blondie's video cassette Eat to the Beat accompanied their 1979 album of the same title. The First National Kidisc, one of the first interactive and educational videodiscs, contained activities designed for children. Without "fancy digital effects", Green's Kidisc provided five to ten hours of interactive capability within a 30-minute video through the use of dual audio tracks, freeze framing, slow motion, and other techniques. Features included plane flying, jokes, paper plane construction, music performance, and other games.

The award went to Nesmith, who is known for creating one of the first companies to distribute television programs and films on home video, and for establishing the television music video format that eventually became MTV. In 1976, Nesmith produced a video for his song "Rio", and later incorporated it into the "montage of music and gags" called Elephant Parts after starting the company Pacific Arts Video Records. In 1985, Elephant Parts was adapted into a seven-episode summer series on NBC titled Michael Nesmith in Television Parts.

Nominees for the 25th Grammy Awards included: Elton John for Visions: Elton John, Olivia Newton-John for Olivia Physical, the rock band The Tubes for The Tubes Video, a recording of Jacques Offenbach's opera The Tales of Hoffmann by the Royal Opera conducted by Georges Prêtre with Plácido Domingo, and the interactive disc for children Fun and Games by various artists (produced by Margaret Murphy). Both Visions and The Tubes Video were directed by Russell Mulcahy. Visions consisted of "artistic" videos for all of the songs on John's 1981 album The Fox. According to The Tubes' official site, the now out of print video collection contained music videos primarily for tracks that appeared on their 1981 album The Completion Backward Principle. The award was presented to Newton-John (then her fourth Grammy Award) in February 1983 at the Shrine Auditorium in Los Angeles. Released a few years following her role in the 1978 film Grease, the aerobics video contained songs from her 1981 album Physical as well as enough sexual innuendo and provocation to generate controversy.

== Category retirement ==
The Video of the Year category was discontinued with the establishment of the MTV Video Music Awards in 1984, whose top award is also presented for Video of the Year. The Academy replaced the category with awards for Best Video, Short Form and Best Video Album beginning with the 26th Grammy Awards. For the awards held in 1988 and 1989, the criteria changed and honors were presented for the categories Best Concept Music Video and Best Performance Music Video. The Academy returned to the previous format in 1990, though the two categories were renamed Best Long Form Music Video (changed to Best Music Film in 2014) and Best Short Form Music Video (shortened to Best Music Video in 2014) respectively.

== See also ==
- Latin Grammy Award for Best Long Form Music Video
- Latin Grammy Award for Best Short Form Music Video
- List of awards and honors received by Olivia Newton-John
