= Jay Burna =

- Also known as: Jay Burna
- Born: Jude Francois; March 7, 1995 (age 31); Los Angeles, California
- Origin: Fort Lauderdale, Florida
- Genres: Hip hop; trap; R&B; reggae fusion
- Occupations: Rapper; singer; songwriter; director
- Instrument: Vocals
- Years active: 2008–present
- Labels: Black Congress Music Group, Grand Hustle
- Website: jayburna.com

Jude Francois (born March 7, 1995), better known by his stage name Jay Burna, is a Haitian American rapper, singer and director. Jay is best known for his hit singles "Ready", "Mood", and "Mine All Mine". Jay has also worked with artists and producers such as T.I, Kid Ink, Khalil, Sammie, Trina, Fetty Wap, Curren$y, Jerry Wonda, and Wyclef Jean.

== Early life ==
Francois was born on March 7, 1995, in Los Angeles, California to Haitian parents Dieudonne Francois and Antoinette Francois at the Harbor-UCLA Medical Center. Jay is the oldest of his three siblings. Jay's father Dieudonne introduced him to music at the age of four, especially Marvin Gaye and Zapp & Roger. Jay started showcasing his talent by freestyling for his peers in school. Jay then moved to Fort Lauderdale, Florida, where he resides today.

== Career ==
Jay released his debut hit single "Ready", which has been featured on MTV and VH1. Jay then released another hit single "Mood", which premiered on the front page of Vibe. Jay founded and operates Black Congress Music Group, an independent label.

== Discography ==
=== Singles ===
1. Jay Burna – Ready
2. Jay Burna – Mood – charted at No. 119 on urban radio and No. 19 on the indie label charts
3. Jay Burna – Change the Game – over 1 million streams on Spotify and reached select streaming charts
4. Jay Burna – Melrose – amassed 3 million plus streams on SoundCloud. Named after his hometown neighborhood in Broward County, FL.
5. Jay Burna – Mine All Mine – amassed Three million plus streams on all platforms.
6. Jay Burna—Game Time Featuring Trina
7. Jay Burna—Jamaica With Fetty Wap Featuring Daniel Skye
8. Jay Burna—Life of The Party
9. Jay Burna - U the Sh*t Featuring T.I.

=== EPs ===
List of EP's, with details
Title	EP details
Dear You, No More Apologies	Release Date: October 27, 2023; Label: Black Congress Music Group; Format: Digital Download,
Trophy	Release Date: October 30, 2021; Label: Black Congress Music Group; Format: Digital Download,
Trill Nights	Release Date: March 4, 2016; Label: Black Congress Music Group; Format: Digital Download,
Fear is a Lie	Release Date: April 21, 2015; Label: Black Congress Music Group; Format: Digital Download, Physical CD

=== Mixtapes ===
List of mixtapes, with album details
Title	Album details
I'm a Beast	Release Date: May 21, 2008; Label: Black Congress Music Group; Format: Digital Download
Heart of the City	Released: February 18, 2009; Label: Black Congress Music Group; Format: Digital Download
1st Degree Burn	Released: June 9, 2009; Label: Black Congress Music Group; Format: Digital Download
Believe in Burna	Released: October 13, 2009; Label: Black Congress Music Group; Format: Digital Download
Since 1989 (Hosted By DJ Ill & DJ Rockstar)	Released: June 15, 2010; Label: Black Congress Music Group; Format: Digital Download
Burna's World	Released: September 11, 2010; Label: Black Congress Music Group; Format: Digital Download
Chosen One (w/ Urban Noize)	Released: January 12, 2011; Label: Black Congress Music Group; Format: Digital Download
Winter's Summer	Released: December 31, 2011; Label: Black Congress Music Group; Format: Digital download
Chosen One 2 (w/ Urban Noize)	Released: September 20, 2012; Label: Black Congress Music Group; Format: Digital download
Winter's Summer 2	Released: January 1, 2013; Label: Black Congress Music Group; Format: Digital download
Downtown (Hosted By DJ Cos The Kid)	Released: September 26, 2014; Label: Black Congress Music Group; Format: Digital download
