= The Main Event (video) =

Video by Olivia Newton-John John Farnham Anthony Warlow
- Released: April 1999
- Recorded: 8 December 1998
- Venues: Melbourne Park (Melbourne, Australia)
- Genre: Concert
- Length: 159 minutes
- Label: Worldstar
- Director: Chong Lim
- Producers: James Erskine, Tony Cochrane, Glenn Wheatley

Olivia Newton-John John Farnham Anthony Warlow chronology
Olivia Down Under (1989)	The Main Event (1999)	Video Gold (2005)

The Main Event is a 1999 video of The Main Event Tour by singers Olivia Newton-John, John Farnham and Anthony Warlow.

== Track listing ==
1. "Overture"
2. "Age of Reason" [JF, ONJ, AW]
3. "Phantom of The Opera" [AW, ONJ, JF]
4. "A Little More Love" [ONJ, JF, AW]
5. "This is The Moment" [Anthony]
6. "Hopelessly Devoted to You" [Olivia]
7. "Everytime You Cry" [John]
8. "Please Don't Ask Me" [ONJ, JF]
9. "You're the One That I Want" [ONJ, JF]
10. "The Long And Winding Road" [AW, ONJ]
11. "Take Me Home Country Roads" [AW, ONJ]
12. "I Honestly Love You" [ONJ, AW]
13. "Love Is A Gift" [ONJ, AW]
14. "That's Life/Bad Habits" [AW, JF]
15. "Granada" [AW, JF]
16. "You've Lost That Loving Feeling" [AW, ONJ, JF]
17. "Summer Nights" [AW, ONJ, JF]
18. "If Not For You" [ONJ, AW, JF]
19. "Let Me Be There" [ONJ, AW, JF]
20. "Raindrops Keep Falling on My Head" [ONJ, AW, JF]
21. "Jolene" [ONJ, AW, JF]
22. "Hearts on Fire" [ONJ, AW, JF]
23. "Don't You Know it's Magic" [ONJ, AW, JF]
24. "You're The Voice" [JF, ONJ, AW]
