= Soul Kiss =

1985 studio album by Olivia Newton-John

Studio album by Olivia Newton-John
- Released: 25 October 1985
- Studios: Moonee Ponds Studio (Malibu, California); Ocean Way Recording (Hollywood, California)
- Genres: Pop; synth-pop
- Length: 39:39
- Label: Mercury
- Producer: John Farrar

Olivia Newton-John chronology
| Two of a Kind (1983) | Soul Kiss (1985) | The Rumour (1988) |

Singles from Soul Kiss
- 1. "Soul Kiss" Released: 25 September 1985; 2. "Toughen Up" Released: 25 January 1986

Soul Kiss is the thirteenth studio album by English-Australian singer Olivia Newton-John, released on 25 October 1985 by Mercury Records in Europe, by Festival Records in Australia, and by MCA Records in the United States. It reached No. 11 on the Australian Kent Music Report Albums Chart and No. 29 on the United States Billboard 200. The album was produced by long-time associate John Farrar, who also co-wrote four tracks; the cover art features photography of Newton-John by Helmut Newton and Herb Ritts.

== Singles ==
The album's title track was released as a single and reached No. 20 on the US Billboard Hot 100 and Adult Contemporary charts, as well as No. 20 on the Australian Kent Music Report singles chart. It is Newton-John's most recent US top-40 pop single and her second-to-last in Canada. The single reached No. 100 on the UK Singles Chart. It was also remixed into a 12-inch single mix, which featured a new Carib-influenced percussion overdub.

The follow-up single, "Toughen Up" (written for Tina Turner but rejected by her), failed to chart, except for a top-70 placement in Australia. A remix by Jellybean Benitez was released as a 12-inch single in 1986.

== Critical reception ==
Professional ratings
Review scores
| Source | Rating |
|---|---|
| AllMusic | 2.5/5 stars |

Writing for Rolling Stone, Davitt Sigerson gave the album a mixed review. "After a long period of corporate fine tuning, MCA released Olivia's Soul Kiss with a kinky Helmut Newton cover, a lean John Farrar production and a fun single, the album's title track. Originally (and wisely) passed on by Tina Turner, 'Soul Kiss' is just right for Newton-John. She proves once again that she is the best pure pop singer working today. Check her out live sometime, mark her for range, pitch, phrasing, energy, ballsiness and, yes, commitment to the songs, and see if you don't agree. Too bad the rest of the material doesn't match up. There are good songs, but no other bull's-eyes, and a pair of embarrassments." Sigerson would go on to produce Newton-John's next studio album, The Rumour in 1988.

In their review of the album, Billboard commented that "the pop diva returns with sophisticated production and a mixed bag of soft rockers and ballads. Beautifully packaged and well crafted, the collection should more than satisfy her faithful followers, although there's little here that promises to expand that following."

Cashbox stated that "Olivia Newton-John’s commercial track record is undeniable, and Soul Kiss should be another retail and radio coup for the vocalist. With fast movers like the title track and biting cuts like “Queen Of The Publication," Newton spreads her musical wings a bit, and with help from musicians like Lee Ritenour, Tom Scott and Steve Lukather, look for the highly polished “Soul Kiss” to be a hot seller during the Christmas rush."

AllMusic editor Joe Viglione retrospectively found that Soul Kiss "seems a bit contrived...Olivia seems to have abandoned her strongholds, adult contemporary and country, her superstar status not worthy of this temporary image, a transition which needed stronger material for this big a change." He also called the album "as a whole, [...] one of the weaker links in Olivia's remarkable chain."

== Commercial performance ==
At the time of the album's release, Newton-John was pregnant and not available for any in-person promotion of the album or its lead single. Although the album was not as commercially successful as her previous efforts, it peaked at No. 29 on the Billboard 200 in the United States, and was certified Gold by the Recording Industry Association of America (RIAA). It charted at No. 5 in Japan; and peaked at No. 11 on the Australian Kent Music Report Albums Chart.

== Track listing ==
All tracks produced by John Farrar.

Standard edition
| No. | Title | Writer(s) | Length |
|---|---|---|---|
| 1. | "Toughen Up" | Graham Lyle; Terry Britten | 3:51 |
| 2. | "Soul Kiss" | Mark Goldenberg | 4:32 |
| 3. | "Queen of the Publication" | John Farrar; Steve Kipner; Tom Snow | 3:55 |
| 4. | "Emotional Tangle" | Farrar; Billy Thorpe | 4:05 |
| 5. | "Culture Shock" | Kipner; Paul Bliss | 3:52 |
| 6. | "Moth to a Flame" | Kipner; Bliss | 3:46 |
| 7. | "Overnight Observation" | Farrar; Snow | 4:27 |
| 8. | "You Were Great, How Was I?" (duet with Carl Wilson) | Farrar; Snow | 3:46 |
| 9. | "Driving Music" | Kipner; Tommy Emmanuel | 3:41 |
| 10. | "The Right Moment" | Gerry Rafferty | 3:44 |

European/Japanese edition
| No. | Title | Writer(s) | Length |
|---|---|---|---|
| 10. | "Electric" | Tom Keane; Michael Landau; Paul Gordon | 3:49 |
| 11. | "The Right Moment" | Rafferty | 3:44 |

Japan 2010 SHM-CD bonus track(s)
| No. | Title | Writer(s) | Length |
|---|---|---|---|
| 10. | "Electric" | Keane; Landau; Gordon | 3:49 |
| 11. | "Soul Kiss" (Extended 12" remix version) | Goldenberg | 7:01 |

== Personnel ==
=== Musicians ===
- Olivia Newton-John – lead vocals, backing vocals (1, 4, 5, 9), vocoder (10)
- Marcus Ryle – synthesizers (1, 3–6, 8–10)
- Greg Phillinganes – synthesizers (2)
- Mark Goldenberg – synthesizers (2)
- Billy Thorpe – synthesizers (4)
- Steve Kipner – synthesizers (5)
- Tom Snow – synthesizers (7, 8)
- John Farrar – guitars (1–3, 6, 7, 9), backing vocals (1, 4, 6, 7, 9, 11), Synclavier (2–4, 6, 7, 9), vocoder (4, 9), mandolin (11)
- Lee Ritenour – guitars (1, 3, 4, 6–9)
- Larry Carlton – guitars (2)
- Steve Lukather – guitars (3)
- Michael Landau – guitars (10)
- Abraham Laboriel – bass guitar (1)
- Nathan East – bass guitar (4)
- Carlos Vega – drums (1, 3, 4, 6–10)
- Vinnie Colaiuta – drums (2)
- Geoffrey Hales – electronic drums (7)
- Paulinho da Costa – percussion (1, 4)
- Michael Fisher – percussion (2), typewriter effects (3)
- Jeremy Lubbock – strings arrangements (4, 11), keyboards (11)
- Gerard Vinci – concertmaster (4, 11)
- Tom Scott – lyricon (7), saxophone (8, 10)
- Gary Herbig – saxophone (10)
- Joel Peskin – saxophone (10)
- Larry Williams – saxophone (10)
- Ara Tokatlián – pan flute (11)
- Katey Sagal – backing vocals (2)
- Christopher Cross – backing vocals (8)
- Carl Wilson – lead vocals (8), backing vocals (8)

=== Technical ===
- Allen Sides – recording, mixing
- Tim Wilson – recording assistant, mix assistant
- Larry Brown – additional recording
- Rik Pekkonen – additional recording
- Bernie Grundman – mastering at Bernie Grundman Mastering (Hollywood, California)

=== Artwork ===
- Norman Moore – art direction, design
- Helmut Newton – photography
- Herb Ritts – photography

== Charts ==
Chart performance for Soul Kiss
| Chart (1985–1986) | Peak position |
|---|---|
| Australian Albums (Kent Music Report) | 11 |
| Canada Top Albums/CDs (RPM) | 36 |
| Dutch Albums (Album Top 100) | 36 |
| European Albums (Eurotipsheet) | 46 |
| German Albums (Offizielle Top 100) | 54 |
| Japanese Albums (Oricon) | 5 |
| New Zealand Albums (RMNZ) | 43 |
| Swedish Albums (Sverigetopplistan) | 46 |
| UK Albums (Official Charts) | 66 |
| US Billboard 200 | 29 |
| US Cash Box Top 200 Albums | 47 |

== Certifications ==
Certifications for Soul Kiss
| Region | Certification | Certified units/sales |
|---|---|---|
| Canada (Music Canada) | Gold | 50,000^{^} |
| United States (RIAA) | Gold | 500,000^{^} |
^{^} Shipments figures based on certification alone.

== Video ==
Soul Kiss

Video by Olivia Newton-John
- Released: 1985
- Recorded: 1985
- Genre: Music video
- Length: 20 minutes
- Label: MCA Home Video
- Director: David Mallet
- Producer: Jacqui Byford

Olivia Newton-John chronology
| Twist of Fate (1983) | Soul Kiss (1985) | Olivia Down Under (1989) |

Soul Kiss is a compilation of music videos from the album Soul Kiss, featuring the singer Olivia Newton-John.

Matt Lattanzi, her husband at the time, appeared in the "Soul Kiss" video.

=== Contents ===
- "Soul Kiss"
- "Culture Shock"
- "Emotional Tangle"
- "Toughen Up"
- "The Right Moment"
