= Deeper Than the Night =

Single by Olivia Newton-John

from the album Totally Hot
- B-side: "Please Don't Keep Me Waiting"
- Released: April 1979 (US); June 1979 (UK)
- Recorded: 1978
- Genre: Pop, post-disco
- Length: 3:35
- Label: MCA Records
- Songwriters: Tom Snow, Johnny Vastano
- Producer: John Farrar

Olivia Newton-John singles chronology
"A Little More Love" (1978)	"Deeper Than the Night" (1979)	"Totally Hot" (1979)

"Deeper Than the Night" is a song by Olivia Newton-John. It was released as the second US single from Newton-John's tenth studio album, Totally Hot.

Record World said that it "features a wailing guitar line and a strong rock beat."

The song reached No. 11 on the US Billboard Hot 100 and No. 18 in Canada. On the adult contemporary charts it was a bigger hit, reaching No. 4 and No. 7 in those countries, respectively. It was also a minor hit in both the UK and Australia.

== Track listing and formats ==
All tracks produced by John Farrar.

- Australian 7-inch vinyl single (Interfusion Records)

A. "Deeper Than the Night" (Snow, Vastano) – 3:35
B. "Please Don't Keep Me Waiting" (Joe Falsia, Stephen Sinclair) – 5:48

- UK 7-inch vinyl single (EMI Records)

A. "Deeper Than the Night" (Snow, Vastano) – 3:35
B. "Please Don't Keep Me Waiting" (Falsia, Sinclair) – 5:48

- US/Canadian 7-inch vinyl single (MCA Records)

A. "Deeper Than the Night" (Snow, Vastano) – 3:35
B. "Please Don't Keep Me Waiting" (Falsia, Sinclair) – 5:48

== Charts ==
=== Weekly charts ===
Chart (1979)	Peak position
Australian (Kent Music Report)	74
Canada Top Singles (RPM)	18
Canada Adult Contemporary (RPM)	7
Israel (Israeli Singles Chart)	7
UK Singles (OCC)	64
US Billboard Hot 100	11
US Adult Contemporary (Billboard)	4
US Hot Country Songs (Billboard)	87
US Cashbox Top 100	19
Quebec (ADISQ)	35

=== Year-end charts ===
Chart (1979)	Rank
Canada Top Singles (RPM)	129
US (Joel Whitburn's Pop Annual)	85
