= Landslide (Olivia Newton-John song) =

Single by Olivia Newton-John

from the album Physical
- B-side: "Recovery"
- Released: January 1982
- Recorded: 1981
- Studio: Ocean Way Recording, Los Angeles
- Genre: Dance rock
- Length: 4:21 (album version); 3:50 (single version)
- Label: EMI (UK); MCA (US)
- Songwriter: John Farrar
- Producer: John Farrar

Olivia Newton-John singles chronology
"Make a Move on Me" (1982)	"Landslide" (1982)	"Heart Attack" (1982)

Music video
- "Landslide" on YouTube

"Landslide" is a song recorded by British-Australian singer Olivia Newton-John for her eleventh studio album, Physical (1981). Written and produced by John Farrar, the song was released in Europe as the second single from the album in January 1982 and in the US and Canada as the third and final single in April 1982.

"Landslide" peaked within the top 20 in Belgium and at No. 18 on the UK Singles Chart. It also peaked at No. 52 on the US Billboard Hot 100 and No. 54 on the US Cash Box Top 100.

== Tempo and musical style ==
"Landslide" incorporates a blend of rock and new wave elements with pronounced use of guitars, synthesizers and a 4/4 tempo at 131 beats per minute. There is a heavy use of Vocoder effects in the background and the percussion utilizes timpani rolls to great effect.

== Versions ==
While there were no official remixes done at the time of its original release, there are three distinct versions of "Landslide". The album version at 4:21, the video version at 4:28 incorporates two bars of rhythm track intro, and the single edit at 3:50 which omits one repeat of the chorus at the end.

== Music video ==
The music video for "Landslide" was directed by Brian Grant and is set in a highly-stylized and futuristic setting with Olivia Newton-John in various outfits ranging from a space-age catsuit to a red leather mini dress. The video should also be noted for featuring her soon-to-be husband Matt Lattanzi (who she had met on the set of her film "Xanadu") and the female-fantasy driven theme. "Landslide" was included on the "Olivia Physical" video album released by MCA Home Video in 1981 on VHS videocassette and Laserdisc. The video album "Olivia Physical" won the Video of the Year award at the 25th Grammy Awards in 1983.

== Critical reception ==
Cash Box described it as one of the "rockier tracks" on Physical, noting that its tom-tom drums rolled "ominously". They observed that Newton-John's normally "lighter-than-air voice" sounded "more frantic and fiery than usual".

== Track listing and formats ==
- US 7-inch vinyl single (MCA Records)
1. "Landslide (Single Edit)" (Farrar) - 3:50
2. "Recovery (LP Version)" (Farrar, Tom Snow) - 4:20
- UK 7-inch vinyl single (EMI Records)
1. "Landslide" (Farrar) – 4:23
2. "Recovery" (Farrar, Tom Snow) – 4:18

== Personnel ==
- Olivia Newton-John – lead and backing vocals
- John Farrar – guitars, vocoder, bass guitar
- Michael Boddicker – synthesizers
- Carlos Vega – drums, timpani

== Charts ==
Weekly charts for "Landslide"
Chart (1982)	Peak position
Belgium (Ultratop 50 Flanders)	18
Ireland (IRMA)	25
Israel (Israeli Singles Chart)	29
Luxembourg (Radio Luxembourg)	13
Netherlands (Single Top 100)	39
UK Singles (Official Charts Company)	18
US Billboard Hot 100	52
US Cash Box Top Singles	54

== Bibliography ==
- O'Neil, Thomas (1999), The Grammys, Perigree Books, ISBN 0-399-52477-0
