= Totally Hot =

Studio album by Olivia Newton-John
- Released: 21 November 1978
- Recorded: June–July 1978
- Studios: Cherokee, Hollywood; Hollywood Sound, Hollywood; Group IV, Hollywood
- Genres: Pop rock; country pop
- Length: 39:19
- Label: MCA
- Producer: John Farrar

Olivia Newton-John chronology
Grease (1978)	Totally Hot (1978)	Xanadu (1980)

Singles from Totally Hot
- 1. "A Little More Love" Released: November 1978; 2. "Totally Hot" Released: March 1979 (EU); 3. "Deeper Than the Night" Released: April 1979 (US)

Totally Hot is the eleventh studio album by British-Australian singer Olivia Newton-John, released on 21 November 1978. Commercially, it became her first top-ten album on the Billboard 200 chart since Have You Never Been Mellow (1975). Dressed on the album cover all in leather, Newton-John's transformation was seen to mirror her character Sandy's transformation in Grease. At the time, Totally Hot was her most successful album and became her first album to receive a Platinum certification by the Recording Industry Association of America (RIAA).

== Background and production ==
1978 was a big year for Newton-John, when her career soared after she starred in the film adaptation of the Broadway musical Grease. She was offered the lead role of Sandy after meeting producer Allan Carr at a dinner party at Helen Reddy's home. The movie became the biggest box-office hit of 1978, and the soundtrack album which the former two songs were written and composed by her long-time music producer, John Farrar, specifically for the film, yielded three Top 5 singles for Newton-John and became one of the best-selling soundtracks of all time.

Newton-John's transformation in Grease from goody-goody "Sandy 1" to spandex-clad "Sandy 2" emboldened Newton-John to do the same with her music career. In November 1978, she released Totally Hot.

== Critical reception ==
Professional ratings
Review scores
Source	Rating
AllMusic	4/5 stars
Stereo Review	(favourable)

The album received very positive reviews from music critics. Joe Viglione from AllMusic wrote that the album "is one of the most fun albums from Olivia Newton John". He also said that "[the album] is one of her most satisfying projects" and "one of the more consistently entertaining albums in the collection". This album is widely regarded as one of Olivia Newton-John's best album.

Billboard praised the album, noting that "Newton-John proves that she is more than just the queen of MOR. Six of the cuts here are up-tempo, including an explosive version of the Spencer Davis Group's "Gimme Some Lovin'" on which a hot Newton-John squeals, shouts and spits out the lyrics in a departure which will amaze her long-time fans and perhaps finally win over her detractors. The frenetic rocker "You're The One That I Want" set the stage for this musical shift, and Newton-John has seized the chance to broaden her musical appeal. To be sure there are some ballads here, but they aren't swamped with strings as has been the case in the past. Instead most of the cuts here feature a basic tight band sound."

Cashbox noted that "the title of Olivia's first studio album in nearly two years describes her status since her eminently successful role in Grease. This album should only continue that streak since it contains enough ballads to please her fans of old plus enough sassy material to satisfy those who were won over by the punchy "You're The One That I Want." Of special note are the aggressive vocals on the title tune, an Allen Toussaint/New Orleans-styled tune and "Please Don't Keep Me Waiting," an ambitious cut which shows what Olivia can really do."

Rolling Stone were harsh in their criticism, referring to the album as "an abysmal, by-the-numbers affair probably whipped up by some leading exponents of the New Hollywood music scene to capitalize on Olivia Newton-John's less-than-incandescent performance in the film version of Grease. While the queen of cotton-candy soul peers out in desperado drag from the album's inner sleeve, song titles like "Never Enough," "Totally Hot" and "Gimme Some Lovin'" promise the kind of down-and-dirty grit that Newton-John is scarcely equipped to deliver. The title track certainly elevates funk to new levels of weightlessness. And "A Little More Love," the one number that could conceivably arouse any interest, merely serves to showcase the singer's newly acquired rock squawk in the upper registers."

== Commercial performance ==
Totally Hot was Newton-John's first American Top 10 solo album in over three years, reaching #7 on the Billboard 200 and remaining on the chart for 39 weeks.

The album reached No. 30 in the UK (where it was also released as a limited edition picture disc) and it was certified Gold. The album was a top 10 success in Australia, Canada, the Netherlands, Israel, and Japan as well as a chart-topper in Ireland. The album was re-released in Japan during 2010. featuring two bonus tracks: an extended version of "Totally Hot" and "Love Is Alive" from her 1981 live album, Love Performance.

Although the album de-emphasised Newton-John's country sound, it still reached No. 4 on the Billboard Country Albums chart.

== Track listing ==
Side one

1. "Please Don't Keep Me Waiting" (Joe Falsia, Stephen Sinclair) – 5:51
2. "Dancin' 'Round and 'Round" (Adam Mitchell) – 4:02
3. "Talk to Me" (Olivia Newton-John) – 3:31
4. "Deeper Than the Night" (Tom Snow, Johnny Vastano) – 3:39
5. "Borrowed Time" (Olivia Newton-John) – 3:38

Side two

1. "A Little More Love" (John Farrar) – 3:29
2. "Never Enough" (John Farrar, Pat Farrar, Trevor Spencer, Alan Tarney) – 4:13
3. "Totally Hot" (John Farrar) – 3:14
4. "Boats Against the Current" (Eric Carmen) – 4:00
5. "Gimme Some Lovin'" (Spencer Davis, Muff Winwood, Steve Winwood) – 4:15

2010 Japanese SHM-CD bonus tracks

11. "Love Is Alive" (Live in Osaka, Japan, December 1976) – 3:04
12. "Totally Hot" (extended version) – 5:20

== Personnel ==
Credits adapted from the album's liner notes.

- Olivia Newton-John – lead and backing vocals
- Jai Winding – pianos (1, 2, 5–10), horn arrangements (8), organ (10)
- Michael Boddicker – synthesizers (1, 2, 7)
- David Foster – pianos (3)
- Tom Snow – pianos (4)
- John Farrar – guitars (1–5, 7–10), backing vocals (4, 8), all album arrangements
- Steve Lukather – guitars (3, 6, 10), guitar synthesizer solo (7)
- David McDaniels – bass guitar (1, 5)
- David Hungate – bass guitar (2–4, 6–10)
- Mike Botts – drums (1, 2, 5–10)
- Ed Greene – drums (3, 4)
- David Kemper – drums (6, 10)
- Lenny Castro – percussion (3, 6, 8, 10)
- Victor Feldman – percussion (4), vibraphone (4)
- Marty Grebb – alto saxophone (3, 8)
- Jerry Peterson – tenor saxophone (3, 8)
- Chuck Findley – trombone (3, 8)
- Steve Madaio – trumpet (3, 8)
- James Newton Howard – string arrangements (9)
- Sid Sharp – concertmaster (9)
- Sandy Ighner – backing vocals (8)
- Petsye Powell – backing vocals (8, 10)
- Phyllis St. James – backing vocals (8)
- Pattie Brooks – backing vocals (10)
- Carolyn Dennis – backing vocals (10)
- Roy Galloway – backing vocals (10)
- Jim Gilstrap – backing vocals (10)
- Patricia Henderson – backing vocals (10)
- John Lehman – backing vocals (10)
- Zedrich Turnbough – backing vocals (10)

Production

- John Farrar – producer
- David J. Holman – engineer, mixing
- Michael Carnavale – second engineer
- Terry Becker – second engineer
- Betsy Banghart – second engineer
- Bart Johnson – second engineer
- Ron Garrett – second engineer
- George Tutko – second engineer
- Bob Mockler – second engineer
- Allen Zentz – mastering

Studios

- Recorded at Cherokee Studios, Hollywood Sound Recorders and Group IV Recording Studios in Hollywood, California.
- Mixed at Indigo Ranch in Malibu, California.
- Mastered at Allen Zentz Mastering in Hollywood, California.

Design

- Ria Lewerke – art direction, design
- Claude Mougin – photography
- Fleur Thiemeyer – costume design

Business

- MCA Records – record label, US copyright owner (1978)
- EMI Records – record label, UK copyright owner (1978)
- Interfusion Records – record label, Australian copyright owner (1978)

== Charts ==
=== Weekly charts ===
Weekly chart performance for Totally Hot
Chart (1978)	Peak position
Australian Albums (Kent Music Report)	7
Canada Top Albums/CDs (RPM)	5
Canada Top Country Albums (RPM)	5
Dutch Albums (Album Top 100)	5
Finnish Albums (Suomen virallinen lista)	25
French Albums (SNEP)	8
New Zealand Albums (RMNZ)	18
Norwegian Albums (VG-lista)	4
Swedish Albums (Sverigetopplistan)	9
UK Albums (Official Charts)	30
US Billboard 200	7
US Top Country Albums (Billboard)	4
US Cash Box Top 100 Albums	5
US Cash Box Country Albums	7
Japanese Oricon LP Chart	9

=== Year-end charts ===
Year-end chart performance for Totally Hot
Chart (1979)	Position
Canada Top Albums/CDs (RPM)	22
US Billboard 200	35
US Top Country Albums (Billboard)	14

== Certifications ==
Certifications for Totally Hot
Region	Certification	Certified units/sales
Canada (Music Canada)	Platinum	100,000^{^}
Netherlands (NVPI)	Gold	50,000^{^}
United Kingdom (BPI)	Gold	100,000^{^}
United States (RIAA)	Platinum	1,000,000^{^}
^{^} Shipments figures based on certification alone.
