= Make a Move on Me =

Single by Olivia Newton-John

from the album Physical
- B-side: "Falling"
- Released: January 1982
- Recorded: 1981
- Genre: Dance-pop
- Length: 3:17
- Label: MCA
- Songwriters: John Farrar; Tom Snow
- Producer: John Farrar

Olivia Newton-John singles chronology
"Physical" (1981)	"Make a Move on Me" (1982)	"Landslide" (1982)

"Make a Move on Me" is a song recorded by singer Olivia Newton-John for her eleventh studio album, 1981's Physical. It was written by John Farrar and Tom Snow, and produced by the former. The follow-up single to the number-one hit "Physical", it was released in January 1982 and peaked at number five on the US Billboard Hot 100 that April. It also became her twelfth and final single to be certified Gold by the Recording Industry Association of America (RIAA).

In Canada, "Make a Move on Me" reached number four on the pop chart and number two for two weeks on the Adult Contemporary chart. It was blocked from the top spot on that chart by "Key Largo" by Bertie Higgins.

Record World said that Newton-John's "saucy vocal solicitation and John Farrar's production make pop-A/C magic."

Juliana Hatfield covered the song on her album Juliana Hatfield Sings Olivia Newton-John.

== Track listing and formats ==
- 7-inch vinyl single (MCA, EMI, 1981)
1. Make a Move on Me – 3:13
2. Falling – 3:42
- 7-inch vinyl single (EMI, 1981)
1. Make a Move on Me – 3:13
2. Stranger's Touch – 3:49

== Charts ==
=== Weekly charts ===
Chart (1982)	Peak position
Australia (Kent Music Report)	8
Germany (GfK)	38
Canada Top Singles (RPM)	4
Canada Adult Contemporary (RPM)	2
Israel (Israeli Singles Chart)	2
Japan (Oricon)	59
Netherlands (Single Top 100)	49
New Zealand (Recorded Music NZ)	22
UK Singles (Official Charts)	43
US Billboard Hot 100	5
US Adult Contemporary (Billboard)	6
US Cash Box Top 100	5
Quebec (ADISQ)	1

=== Year-end charts ===
Chart (1982)	Rank
Australia (Kent Music Report)	84
Canada Top Singles (RPM)	46
US Billboard Hot 100	84
US Cash Box Top 100	35

== Certifications and sales ==
Region	Certification	Certified units/sales
Canada (Music Canada)	Gold	50,000^{^}
^{^} Shipments figures based on certification alone.
