= A Little More Love (Olivia Newton-John song) =

- Standard international picture sleeve (US 7-inch vinyl single pictured)

Single by Olivia Newton-John

from the album Totally Hot
- B-side: "Borrowed Time"
- Released: November 1978
- Studio: Cherokee Studios; Hollywood Sound; Hollywood Group IV, Hollywood, Los Angeles
- Genre: Pop rock
- Length: 3:27
- Label: MCA, EMI
- Songwriter: John Farrar
- Producer: John Farrar

Olivia Newton-John singles chronology
"Summer Nights" (1978)	"A Little More Love" (1978)	"Deeper Than the Night" (1979)

"A Little More Love" is a song recorded by British-Australian singer Olivia Newton-John for her tenth studio album, Totally Hot (1978). Written and produced by Newton-John's long-time record producer John Farrar, the song was released as the lead single from Totally Hot in November 1978 and became a worldwide hit single.

In the United States, "A Little More Love" reached its peak position of number three on the Billboard Hot 100 in February 1979, and peaked at number four on the Adult Contemporary chart. In Canada, it spent three weeks at position number two on the RPM Top Singles chart during February and March 1979, and was the seventh biggest hit of that year. It also reached number five on the RPM Adult Contemporary chart. In the United Kingdom, the song reached number 4, and stayed on the charts for 12 weeks.

Billboard magazine ranked "A Little More Love" as the 17th most popular song of 1979, and Cash Box magazine ranked it as 23rd for the year, where it had peaked at number four in March 1979.

== Reception ==
Record World said the song is "more rock-oriented than [Newton-John's] past pop efforts, and with a song as good as this one, the transition should be a pleasing one."

The Guardian ranked "A Little More Love" as Newton-John's third best song, describing it as "pure pop perfection".

== Charts ==
=== Weekly charts ===
Chart (1978–1979)	Peak position
Australia (Kent Music Report)	9
Belgium (Ultratop 50 Flanders)	4
Canada Top Singles (RPM)	2
Canada Adult Contemporary (RPM)	5
European Singles (Europarade)	2
Finland (Suomen virallinen lista)	19
France (SNEP)	4
Ireland (IRMA)	4
Israel (Israeli Singles Chart)	5
Netherlands (Dutch Top 40)	3
Netherlands (Single Top 100)	4
New Zealand (Recorded Music NZ)	7
Norway (VG-lista)	6
Sweden (Sverigetopplistan)	12
UK Singles (Official Charts)	4
US Billboard Hot 100	3
US Adult Contemporary (Billboard)	4
US Hot Country Songs (Billboard)	94
US Cash Box Top 100	4
West Germany (GfK)	34

Chart (2022)	Peak position
U.S. Digital Song Sales (Billboard)	43
UK Singles Downloads (Official Charts)	59

=== Year-end charts ===
Chart (1979)	Rank position
Australia (Kent Music Report)	62
Belgium (Ultratop 50 Flanders)	43
Canada Top Singles (RPM)	7
Netherlands (Dutch Top 40)	70
Netherlands (Single Top 100)	62
UK Singles (OCC)	76
US Billboard Hot 100	17
US Adult Contemporary (Billboard)	24
US Cash Box Top 100	23

== Certifications ==
Region	Certification	Certified units/sales
Canada (Music Canada)	Gold	75,000^{^}
United Kingdom (BPI)	Silver	250,000^{^}
United States (RIAA)	Gold	1,000,000^{^}
^{^} Shipments figures based on certification alone.
