= Gold (Olivia Newton-John album) =

Greatest hits album by Olivia Newton-John
- Released: 14 June 2005
- Recorded: 1970–1998
- Genres: Pop; country
- Length: 145:23
- Producer: Various

Olivia Newton-John chronology
Indigo: Women of Song (2004)	Gold (2005)	Stronger Than Before (2005)

Professional ratings
Review scores
Source	Rating
AllMusic	4.5/5 stars

Gold is a double album of greatest hits by Olivia Newton-John released on 14 June 2005. It contains all but one of her solo Billboard Hot 100 hits (excluding "I Need Love") and is the first CD to contain the track "Fool Country" (a B-side to "Magic" and contained in the film Xanadu, but not available on the soundtrack).

A different version of the album was released in Australia in conjunction with the Olivia Gold DVD release.

== Track listing ==
=== Disc one ===
1. "If Not for You" – 2:53 from If Not for You
2. "Banks of the Ohio" – 3:16 from If Not for You
3. "Let Me Be There" – 2:57 from Music Makes My Day
4. "If You Love Me (Let Me Know)" – 3:12 from If You Love Me, Let Me Know
5. "I Honestly Love You" – 3:36 from Long Live Love
6. "Have You Never Been Mellow" – 3:30 from Have You Never Been Mellow
7. "Please Mr. Please" – 3:21 from Have You Never Been Mellow
8. "Something Better to Do" – 3:15 from Clearly Love
9. "Let It Shine" – 2:25 from Clearly Love
10. "Come On Over" – 3:40 from Come On Over
11. "Don't Stop Believin'" – 3:36 from Don't Stop Believin'
12. "Every Face Tells a Story" – 3:40 from Don't Stop Believin'
13. "Sam" – 3:41 from Don't Stop Believin'
14. "Making a Good Thing Better" – 3:44 from Making a Good Thing Better
15. "Hopelessly Devoted to You" – 3:05 from Grease
16. "Summer Nights" (with John Travolta) – 3:35 from Grease
17. "You're the One That I Want" (with John Travolta) – 2:47 from Grease
18. "A Little More Love" – 3:27 from Totally Hot
19. "Deeper Than the Night" – 3:36 from Totally Hot
20. "Dancin' 'Round and 'Round" – 3:59 from Totally Hot
21. "Totally Hot" – 3:12 from Totally Hot
22. "Fool Country" – 2:27 from "Magic"

=== Disc two ===
1. "Xanadu" (with Electric Light Orchestra) – 3:27 from Xanadu
2. "Magic" – 4:29 from Xanadu
3. "Suddenly" (with Cliff Richard) – 3:58 from Xanadu
4. "Physical" – 3:41 from Physical
5. "Make a Move on Me" – 3:16 from Physical
6. "Landslide" – 4:22 from Physical
7. "Heart Attack" – 3:04 from Olivia's Greatest Hits Vol. 2
8. "Tied Up" – 4:28 from Olivia's Greatest Hits Vol. 2
9. "Twist of Fate" – 3:40 from Two of a Kind
10. "Livin' in Desperate Times" – 4:03 from Two of a Kind
11. "Soul Kiss" – 4:31 from Soul Kiss
12. "The Best of Me" (with David Foster) – 4:04 from David Foster
13. "Can't We Talk It Over in Bed" – 3:59 from The Rumour
14. "The Rumour" – 3:55 from The Rumour
15. "Reach Out for Me" – 4:22 from Warm and Tender
16. "Deeper Than a River" – 4:18 from Back to Basics: The Essential Collection 1971–1992
17. "Grease Megamix" – 4:49, non-album single, 1990
18. "I Honestly Love You" (with Babyface) – 4:03 from Back With a Heart

=== Australian version ===
1. "Magic"
2. "A Little More Love"
3. "Totally Hot"
4. "Physical"
5. "Twist of Fate"
6. "Heart Attack"
7. "Can't We Talk It Over in Bed"
8. "Deeper Than the Night"
9. "The Promise (The Dolphin Song)" from Physical
10. "Love Make Me Strong" from Physical
11. "Make a Move on Me" from Physical
12. "I Need Love" from Back to Basics: The Essential Collection 1971–1992
13. "I Honestly Love You" from Long Live Love
14. "Hopelessly Devoted to You" (live)
15. "Sam" (live)
16. "Suddenly" (live)
17. "You're the One That I Want" (live)
18. "Xanadu" (live)
19. "Let Me Be There" (live)
20. "Please Mr. Please" (live)

== Charts ==
Chart performance for Gold
Chart (2005)	Peak position
Australian Albums (ARIA)	71
