= Just the Two of Us: The Duets Collection (Vol. 1) =

Compilation album by Olivia Newton-John
- Released: 5 May 2023
- Recorded: 1979–2022
- Genre: Pop
- Length: 67:47
- Label: Primary Wave
- Producer: Paul Anka; Jim Brickman; Dane Bryant; Beth Nielsen Chapman; Dave Cobb; John Farrar; Charles Fisher; David Foster; Humberto Gatica; Barry Gibb; Kelly Lang; Richard Marx; Vinny Vero; Olivia Newton-John; David Pringle; Karl Richardson; Amy Sky

Olivia Newton-John chronology
Hopelessly Devoted: The Hits (2018)	Just the Two of Us: The Duets Collection (Vol. 1) (2023)	Just the Two of Us: The Duets Collection (Vol. 2) (2023)

Singles from Just the Two of Us: The Duets Collection (Vol. 1)
- 1. "Window in the Wall" Released: 21 January 2021; 2. "Put Your Head on My Shoulder" Released: 6 May 2021; 3. "Jolene" Released: 17 February 2023

Just the Two of Us: The Duets Collection (Vol. 1) is a posthumous compilation album by Australian singer Olivia Newton-John. It was released on 5 May 2023 by Primary Wave. It is a collection of duets performed by Newton-John during her career, including unreleased tracks and some of her last recordings, as well as previously released songs. Three singles were released from the album – "Window in the Wall" (with daughter Chloe Lattanzi), "Put Your Head on My Shoulder" (with Paul Anka) and "Jolene" (with Dolly Parton) – the first two were released before Newton-John's death on 8 August 2022. "Jolene" with Parton was the final recording Newton-John made before her death.

The album debuted at number 29 on the ARIA Albums Chart.

== Background and development ==
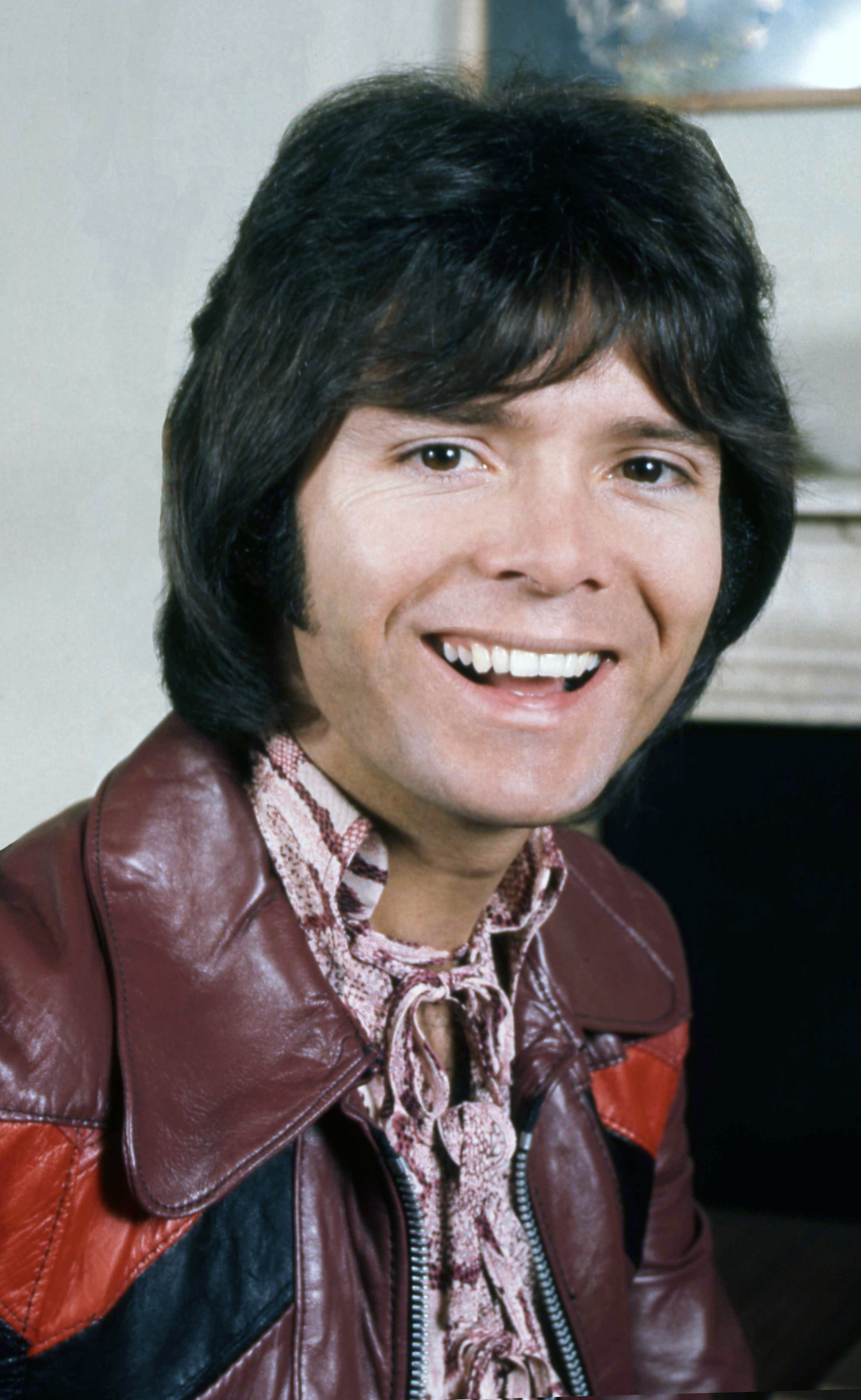
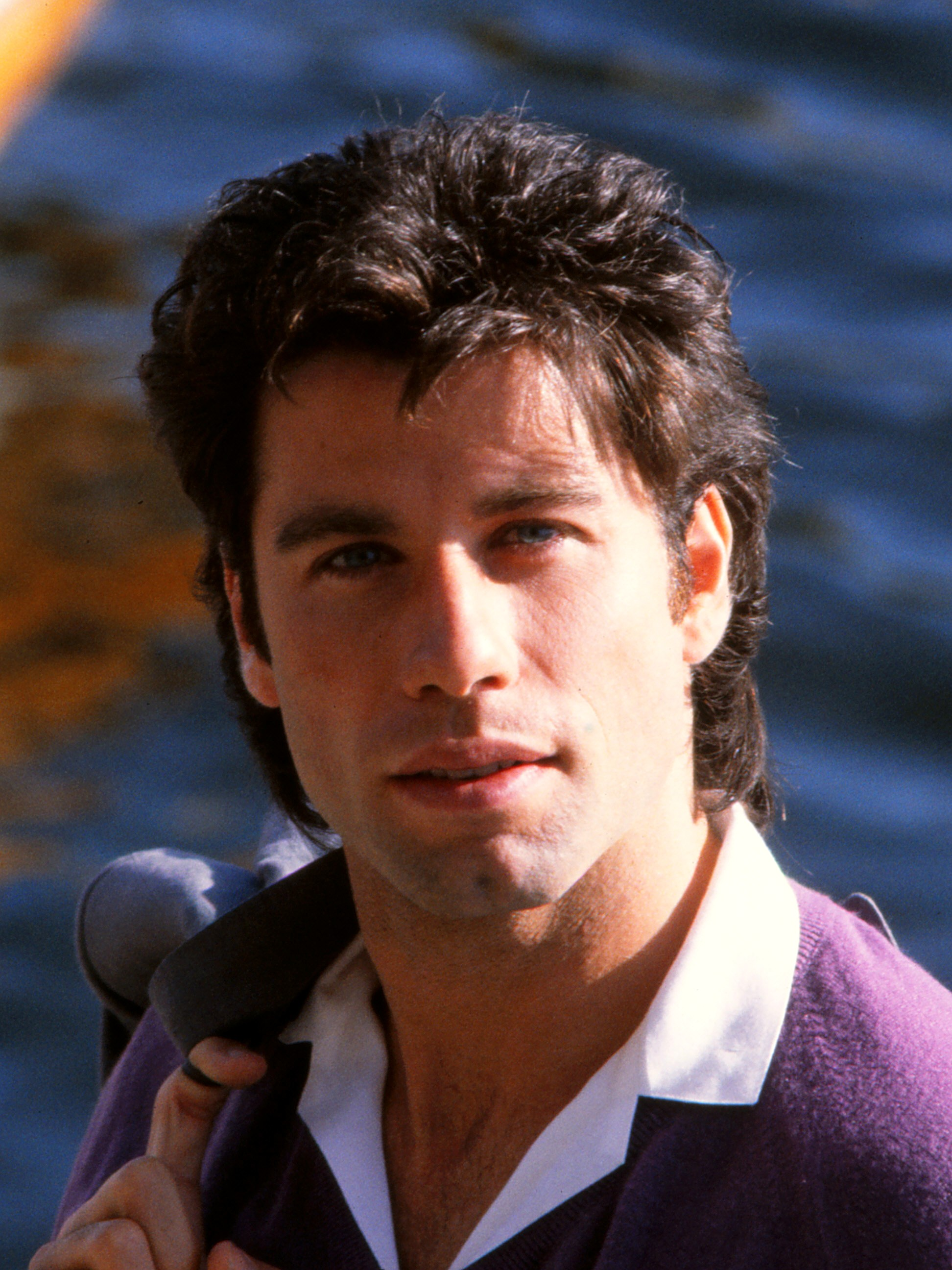
Just the Two of Us features two of Newton-John's frequent singing partners, Cliff Richard (left) and John Travolta (right).

Just the Two of Us, which already was in development before Newton-John's death, is intended to be a collection of duets recorded by the singer in the span 43 years, from 1979 to 2022 – the last year of her life. Produced by music industry veteran Vinny Vero, it was originally conceived as a 32-track single album to be released in August 2021, but the original schedule was delayed and the project was split between two albums. The oldest song featured in the track listing, "Suddenly", is a single from the Xanadu soundtrack, released in 1980. "Take a Chance", part of the Two of a Kind soundtrack, was released as a single in 1984, same year the promotional single "Face to Face" was also released, a song from Barry Gibb's debut solo album Now Voyager. "The Best of Me", from David Foster's 1986 self-titled album, was released as a single in the same year of its parent album.

Four of the compilation's tracks were taken from the recording sessions of Newton-John's 2002 duets album (2): "I'll Come Runnin'", "Never Far Away", "Act of Faith" and "True to Yourself" – the last one remained unreleased due to a dispute between Newton-John and Vanessa Amorosi's labels. "How Can You Mend a Broken Heart", a Bee Gees cover, was released in Kelly Lang's 2016 album Throwback, and "Stone in My Pocket" is a song from Liv On, a collaborative album by Newton-John, Amy Sky and Beth Nielsen Chapman, also released in 2016. "Jolene", a Dolly Parton song already recorded once by Newton-John in 1975, as well as "Window in the Wall" and "Put Your Head on My Shoulder", are new recordings made for Just the Two of Us.

== Singles ==
The compilation's lead single, "Window in the Wall", a duet with Newton-John's daughter Chloe Lattanzi, was released on 21 January 2021, with an accompanying music video featuring the two singers. "Put Your Head on My Shoulder", a re-recording of Paul Anka's 1959 hit single featuring Anka himself, was released as the second single in 6 May of the same year, with an animated music video released in 2 June. The song was also released in Anka's album Making Memories.

The re-recording of "Jolene", a duet between Newton-John and Parton, was recorded in December 2021 and January 2022, and released posthumously on 17 February 2023 as Just the Two of Us's third single. Its accompanying music video was also recorded before Newton-John's death.

== Track listing ==
No.	Title	Writer(s)	Producer(s)	Length
1.	"Suddenly" (with Cliff Richard) (originally released on "Xanadu" in 1980)	John Farrar	Farrar	4:00
2.	"Jolene" (with Dolly Parton) (recorded in 2022)	Dolly Parton	Dane Bryant	3:14
3.	"Act of Faith" (with Michael McDonald) (originally released on "(2)" in 2002)	Michael McDonald; Olivia Newton-John; Tommy Sims	Charles Fisher	4:51
4.	"Window in the Wall" (with Chloe Lattanzi) (recorded in 2021)	Tatiana "Tajči" Cameron; Eddie Kilgallon; Thomas Paden	Dave Cobb	3:48
5.	"Take a Chance" (with John Travolta) (originally released on "Two of a Kind" in 1983)	David Foster; Steve Lukather; Newton-John	Foster	4:08
6.	"Put Your Head on My Shoulder" (with Paul Anka) (originally released on Anka's "Making Memories" in 2021)	Paul Anka	Anka	4:46
7.	"Face to Face" (with Barry Gibb) (originally released on "Now Voyager" in 1984)	Barry Gibb; Maurice Gibb; George Bitzer	Barry Gibb; Karl Richardson	4:18
8.	"I Honestly Love You" (with Jim Brickman) (originally released as a bonus track on Brickman's "My Romance: An Evening with Jim Brickman" in 1999)	Peter Allen; Jeff Barry	Jim Brickman; David Pringle	3:49
9.	"The Best of Me" (with David Foster) (originally released on "David Foster" in 1986)	Foster; Jeremy Lubbock; Richard Marx	Humberto Gatica; Foster	4:06
10.	"True to Yourself" (with Vanessa Amorosi) (originally released on "Change" in 2003)	Jane Vaughan; Sylvia Bennett-Smith; Andrew Murray; Gary Barlow	Fisher	4:01
11.	"Lost Inside Your Heart" (with Jon Secada))	Jon Secada	Randy Barlow	4:04
12.	"I'll Come Runnin'" (with Tina Arena) (originally released on "(2)" in 2002)	Diane Warren	Fisher	4:27
13.	"Never Far Away" (with Richard Marx) (originally released on "(2)" in 2002)	Richard Marx; Jamey Clewer	Fisher; Marx	4:48
14.	"How Can You Mend a Broken Heart" (with Kelly Lang) (originally released on Lang's "Throwback" in 2016)	Barry Gibb; Robin Gibb	Lang	3:47
15.	"Stone in My Pocket" (with Amy Sky and Beth Nielsen Chapman) (originally released on "Liv On" in 2016)	Newton-John; Amy Sky; Beth Nielsen Chapman	Newton-John; Sky; Chapman	3:22
16.	"Love Is a Gift" (with Delta Goodrem) (originally released on "I Honestly Love You" in 2018)	Newton-John; Earl Rose; Victoria Shaw	John Shanks	4:20
17.	"Hopelessly Devoted to You" (with Mariah Carey) (live) (performed during Carey's "Butterfly World Tour" in 1998) (originally released on Carey's DVD "Around the World" in 1999)	Farrar	Jack Gulick; Carey	1:59
Total length:				67:47

== Charts ==
Chart performance for Just the Two of Us: The Duets Collection (Vol. 1)
Chart (2023)	Peak position
Australian Albums (ARIA)	29
Belgian Albums (Ultratop Flanders)	83
Scottish Albums (Official Charts)	39
UK Album Sales (OCC)	18
US Top Album Sales (Billboard)	26

== See also ==
- (2) – Newton-John's 2002 duets album
- A Celebration in Song – Newton-John's 2008 duets album
