= Heartstrings World Tour =

2002–05 concert tour by Olivia Newton-John

- Tour by Olivia Newton-John
- Poster for tour
- Associated album: (2); Indigo: Women of Song; Stronger Than Before
- Start date: 5 September 2002
- End date: 20 November 2005
- Legs: 8
- No. of shows: 162 in North America; 5 in Asia; 12 in Australia; 178 Total

Olivia Newton-John concert chronology
- 30 Musical Years Tour (2001); Heartstrings World Tour (2002–05); 2006 World Tour (2006)

The Heartstrings World Tour is the twelfth concert tour (and third world-tour) by British-Australian pop singer Olivia Newton-John. It began in 2002 and went through until 2005, with shows in North America, Australia and Japan during that time, she supported the three Newton-John albums (2), Indigo: Women of Song, and Stronger Than Before.

== Background ==
The tour began in September 2002 in Canada and had ten legs, eight North American, one Australian, and one Japanese. In November 2005, Newton-John had finished his tour in the United States, were a total of 178 shows, her largest tour to date. Her daughter Chloe Lattanzi has participated in various shows.

== Setlist ==
North America [2002/January 2003]
1. "I Honestly Love You" (Introduction)
2. "Have You Never Been Mellow"
3. "If You Love Me (Let Me Know)"
4. "Xanadu"
5. "Suspended in Time"
6. "Magic"
7. "Dancin'"
8. "Suddenly"
9. "Love Is A Gift"
10. "Please Mr. Please"
11. "Physical"
12. "Falling"
13. "Sand and Water" ^{1}
14. "Never Gonna Give into It"
15. "Don't Cut Me Down"
16. "You're The One That I Want"
17. "Hopelessly Devoted To You"
18. "Summer Nights"
19. "You're The One That I Want" (Reprise)
20. "I Honestly Love You" (Encore)
^{1} Only in 2002
North America [February/May 2003]
1. "Have You Never Been Mellow"
2. "Xanadu"
3. "Magic"
4. "Dancin'"
5. "Love Is A Gift"
6. "Sam"
7. Medley: "Don't Stop Believin'", "Please Mr. Please", "Let Me Be There", "Jolene", "Come on Over" ^{1}
8. "Physical" (Bossa Nova Version)
9. "I'll Come Running"
10. "Not Gonna Give into It"
11. "Deeper Than the Night" ^{1}
12. "Don't Cut Me Down"
13. "Over The Rainbow" (duet with Chloe Lattanzi) ^{2}
14. "Reason To Cry" (Chloe Lattanzi solo) ^{2}
15. "It Takes Two" (duet with Chloe Lattanzi) ^{2}
16. "Suddenly"
17. "You're The One That I Want"
18. "Hopelessly Devoted To You"
19. "Summer Nights"
20. "I Honestly Love You"

^{1} Only in May

^{2} Only in February
Japan/Australia [2003]
1. "Instrumental Medley" ^{1}
2. "I Honestly Love You" (Introduction)
3. "Have You Never Been Mellow"
4. "Xanadu"
5. "Magic"
6. "Dancin'" ^{1}
7. "Love You Crazy"
8. "Sam"
9. Medley: "If Not for You", "Banks of the Ohio", "Let Me Be There", "Please Mr. Please", "Jolene"
10. "Physical" (Bossa Nova Version)
11. "I'll Come Running"
12. "Not Gonna Give into It"
13. "Don't Cut Me Down"
14. "Over The Rainbow" (duet with Chloe Lattanzi)
15. "Reason To Cry" (Chloe Lattanzi solo)
16. "It Takes Two" (duet with Chloe Lattanzi)
17. Medley: "Take Me Home, Country Roads", "Close To You"
18. "Don't Stop Believin'"
19. "Suddenly"
20. "You're The One That I Want"
21. "Hopelessly Devoted To You"
22. "Summer Nights"
23. "Come on Over"
24. "Sunburnt Country" ^{1}
25. "I Honestly Love You" (Encore)
^{1} Only in Australia
North America [2004/April 2005]
1. "I Honestly Love You" (Introduction) ^{1}
2. "My Funny Valentine" ^{2}
3. "Xanadu"
4. "Magic"
5. "Have You Never Been Mellow"
6. "Anyone Who Had A Heart" ^{1}
7. "Love You Crazy" ^{2}
8. "Sam"
9. Country Medley: "Let Me Be There", "Please Mr. Please", "If You Love Me (Let Me Know)", "Come on Over" ^{2}, "Don't Stop Believin'" ^{3}
10. "Physical" (Bossa Nova Version)
11. "Cry Me a River" ^{1}
12. "Not Gonna Give into It"
13. "Don't Cut Me Down"
14. Pop Medley: "The Rumour", "Heart Attack", "Make a Move on Me", "Twist of Fate"
15. "Suddenly"
16. "You're The One That I Want"
17. "Hopelessly Devoted To You"
18. "Summer Nights"
19. "We Go Together" ^{1}
20. "Alfie" ^{3}
21. "I Honestly Love You" (Encore)

^{1} Only in August (2004) and April (2005)
^{2} Only in February (2004)

^{3} Only in August (2004)
North America [October 2005]
1. "I Honestly Love You" (Introduction)
2. "Have You Never Been Mellow"
3. "Magic"
4. "Stronger Than Before"
5. Country Medley: "If Not for You", "Please Mr. Please", "Jolene", "If You Love Me (Let Me Know)"
6. "Physical" (Bossa Nova Version)
7. "Don't Stop Believin'" (Bossa Nova Version)
8. "Pass It On"
9. "Suddenly"
10. "Not Gonna Give into It"
11. "Can I Trust Your Arms" (Olivia play piano too)
12. "Cry Me a River"
13. Pop Medley: "The Rumour", "Heart Attack", "Make a Move on Me", "Twist of Fate"
14. "The Promise (The Dolphin Song)"
15. "Sam"
16. "You're The One That I Want"
17. "Summer Nights"
18. "Hopelessly Devoted To You"
19. "Xanadu"
20. "I Honestly Love You" (Encore)
21. "Serenity"

== Tour dates ==
Date	City	Country	Venue
North America
5 September 2002	Rama	Canada	Casino Rama Entertainment Centre
6 September 2002	Atlantic City	United States	Atlantic City Hilton Theater
7 September 2002	Ledyard	United States	Fox Theatre
10 September 2002	Columbus	United States	Ohio Theatre
12 September 2002	Detroit	United States	Fox Theatre
13 September 2002^{[A]}	Pittsburgh	United States	Heinz Hall for the Performing Arts
14 September 2002	Merrillville	United States	Star Plaza Theatre
15 September 2002	Minneapolis	United States	Orpheum Theatre
17 September 2002^{[B]}	Youngstown	United States	Powers Auditorium
18 September 2002^{[C]}	Knoxville	United States	Tennessee Theatre
20 September 2002	Atlanta	United States	Chastain Park Amphitheater
21 September 2002	Clearwater	United States	Ruth Eckerd Hall
22 September 2002^{[D]}	Jacksonville	United States	Moran Theater
23 September 2002	Fort Lauderdale	United States	Broward Center for the Performing Arts
25 September 2002^{[E]}	Houston	United States	Jones Hall
27 September 2002^{[F]}	Austin	United States	Palmer Events Center
28 September 2002^{[G]}	Fort Worth	United States	Bass Performance Hall
29 September 2002^{[H]}	Little Rock	United States	Robinson Center
1 October 2002^{[I]}	Bernalillo	United States	Santa Ana Concert Arena
3 October 2002	Phoenix	United States	Celebrity Theatre
4 October 2002^{[J]}	Las Vegas	United States	Le Théâtre des Arts
5 October 2002^{[J]}	Las Vegas	United States	Le Théâtre des Arts
6 October 2002	Indio	United States	Fantasy Springs Outdoor Amphitheater
9 January 2003	Wilkes-Barre	United States	F.M. Kirby Center for the Performing Arts
10 January 2003	Verona	United States	Turning Stone Event Center
12 January 2003	Englewood	United States	Bergen Performing Arts Center
20 February 2003	Las Vegas	United States	Le Théâtre des Arts
21 February 2003	Las Vegas	United States	Le Théâtre des Arts
22 February 2003	Las Vegas	United States	Le Théâtre des Arts
23 February 2003	Las Vegas	United States	Le Théâtre des Arts
28 March 2003	Stateline	United States	Circus Maximus Showroom
29 March 2003	Stateline	United States	Circus Maximus Showroom
Asia
2 April 2003	Nagoya	Japan	Aichi Arts Center
4 April 2003	Tokyo	Japan	Tokyo International Forum
6 April 2003	Tokyo	Japan	Tokyo International Forum
7 April 2003	Osaka	Japan	Festival Hall
8 April 2003	Fukuoka	Japan	Fukuoka Civic Hall
Australia
12 April 2003	Brisbane	Australia	Brisbane Entertainment Centre
13 April 2003	Newcastle	Australia	Newcastle Entertainment Centre
14 April 2003	Sydney	Australia	Sydney Entertainment Centre
17 April 2003	Wollongong	Australia	Wollongong Entertainment Centre
19 April 2003	Melbourne	Australia	Rod Laver Arena
22 April 2003	Perth	Australia	Burswood Theatre
23 April 2003	Perth	Australia	Burswood Theatre
26 April 2003	Adelaide	Australia	Adelaide Entertainment Centre
28 April 2003	Canberra	Australia	Royal Theatre
29 April 2003	Canberra	Australia	Royal Theatre
2 May 2003	Sydney	Australia	State Theatre
3 May 2003	Sydney	Australia	State Theatre
North America
15 May 2003	Las Vegas	United States	Le Théâtre des Arts
16 May 2003	Las Vegas	United States	Le Théâtre des Arts
17 May 2003	Las Vegas	United States	Le Théâtre des Arts
18 May 2003	Las Vegas	United States	Le Théâtre des Arts
6 June 2003	Biloxi	United States	Beau Rivage Theatre
7 June 2003	Robinsonville	United States	Bluesville Showcase Nightclub
13 June 2003	Fort Myers	United States	Mann Performing Arts Hall
14 June 2003	Sarasota	United States	Van Wezel Performing Arts Hall
15 June 2003	Atlanta	United States	Chastain Park Amphitheater
18 June 2003	Milwaukee	United States	Northern Lights Theater
19 June 2003	Prior Lake	United States	Mystic Celebrity Palace
20 June 2003	Wisconsin Dells	United States	Crystal Grand Music Theatre
21 June 2003	Merrillville	United States	Star Plaza Theatre
22 June 2003	St. Louis	United States	Fox Theatre
8 August 2003	Reno	United States	Grand Exposition Hall
9 August 2003	Reno	United States	Grand Exposition Hall
11 August 2003	San Diego	United States	Humphreys Concerts by the Bay
12 August 2003	Phoenix	United States	Dodge Theatre
14 August 2003	Las Vegas	United States	Le Théâtre des Arts
15 August 2003	Las Vegas	United States	Le Théâtre des Arts
16 August 2003	Las Vegas	United States	Le Théâtre des Arts
17 August 2003	Las Vegas	United States	Le Théâtre des Arts
29 September 2003	Seattle	United States	McCaw Hall
2 October 2003	Portland	United States	Arlene Schnitzer Concert Hall
4 October 2003	Santa Rosa	United States	Luther Burbank Center for the Arts
5 October 2003	San Francisco	United States	Davies Symphony Hall
7 October 2003	Sacramento	United States	Crest Theatre
10 October 2003	Costa Mesa	United States	Orange County Performing Arts Center
11 October 2003	Costa Mesa	United States	Orange County Performing Arts Center
16 October 2003	Las Vegas	United States	Le Théâtre des Arts
17 October 2003	Las Vegas	United States	Le Théâtre des Arts
18 October 2003	Las Vegas	United States	Le Théâtre des Arts
19 October 2003	Las Vegas	United States	Le Théâtre des Arts
24 October 2003^{[K]}	Omaha	United States	Orpheum Theater
26 October 2003	Indiana	United States	Fisher Auditorium
28 October 2003^{[L]}	Columbia	United States	Carolina Center
30 October 2003^{[M]}	Augusta	United States	Bell Auditorium
31 October 2003^{[N]}	Charlotte	United States	Belk Theater
1 November 2003^{[N]}	Charlotte	United States	Belk Theater
3 November 2003^{[O]}	Jackson	United States	Carl Perkins Civic Center
5 November 2003	New Brunswick	United States	State Theatre
6 November 2003^{[P]}	Westbury	United States	Westbury Music Fair
8 November 2003	Easton	United States	State Theatre
9 November 2003	Toledo	United States	Stranahan Theater
11 November 2003	Youngstown	United States	Stambaugh Auditorium
13 November 2003	Fayetteville	United States	Crown Center Theatre
14 November 2003^{[Q]}	Nashville	United States	Tennessee Performing Arts Center
15 November 2003^{[R]}	Birmingham	United States	BJCC Concert Hall
18 November 2003	Avon Park	United States	SFCC Auditorium
19 November 2003	Tampa	United States	Morsani Hall
20 November 2003^{[S]}	West Palm Beach	United States	Alexander W. Dreyfoos, Jr. Concert Hall
21 November 2003	Macon	United States	Grand Opera House
6 February 2004	Reno	United States	Hlton Theater
7 February 2004	Reno	United States	Hlton Theater
8 February 2004	Temecula	United States	Pechanga Showroom Theater
12 February 2004	Las Vegas	United States	Le Théâtre des Arts
13 February 2004	Las Vegas	United States	Le Théâtre des Arts
14 February 2004	Las Vegas	United States	Le Théâtre des Arts
16 February 2004	El Cajon	United States	East County Performing Arts
17 February 2004	Palm Desert	United States	McCallum Theatre
19 February 2004	Albuquerque	United States	Isleta Showroom
20 February 2004^{[T]}	Salt Lake City	United States	Salt Palace Ballroom
26 August 2004	Salt Lake City	United States	Abravanel Hall
27 August 2004	Las Vegas	United States	Hilton Theater
28 August 2004	Las Vegas	United States	Hilton Theater
1 September 2004^{[U]}	Pueblo	United States	Colorado State Fair Events Center
2 September 2004	Denver	United States	Universal Lending Pavilion
4 September 2004	Stateline	United States	Circus Maximus Showroom
7 September 2004	Tucson	United States	Diamond Center
8 September 2004	Los Angeles	United States	Greek Theatre
10 September 2004	Pala	United States	Palomar Starlight Theater
11 September 2004	Saratoga	United States	Mountain Winery Amphitheater
12 September 2004	Jacksonville	United States	Britt Pavilion
13 September 2004	Turlock	United States	Turlock Community Auditorium
17 September 2004	Tunica Resorts	United States	Bluesville Showcase Nightclub
19 September 2004	McAllen	United States	McAllen Civic Auditorium
20 September 2004	Fort Worth	United States	Bass Performance Hall
21 September 2004	Tulsa	United States	Mabee Center
22 September 2004	Oklahoma City	United States	Civic Center Music Hall
24 September 2004	Biloxi	United States	Beau Rivage Theatre
25 September 2004	Biloxi	United States	Beau Rivage Theatre
26 September 2004^{[V]}	Huntsville	United States	Big Spring International Park
27 September 2004	Lafayette	United States	Heymann Performing Arts Center
29 October 2004	Atlantic City	United States	Atlantic City Hilton Theater
30 October 2004	Atlantic City	United States	Atlantic City Hilton Theater
31 October 2004	Westbury	United States	Westbury Music Fair
3 November 2004	Verona	United States	Turning Stone Event Center
5 November 2005	Rama	Canada	Casino Rama Entertainment Centre
6 November 2005	Rama	Canada	Casino Rama Entertainment Centre
8 November 2004	Williamsport	United States	Community Arts Center
9 November 2004	Easton	United States	State Theatre
10 November 2004	New Brunswick	United States	State Theatre
12 November 2004^{[W]}	Albany	United States	Palace Theatre
13 November 2004^{[X]}	Buffalo	United States	Kleinhans Music Hall
14 November 2004^{[Y]}	Springfield	United States	Symphony Hall
16 November 2004^{[Z]}	Grand Rapids	United States	DeVos Performance Hall
17 November 2004^{[AA]}	Dayton	United States	Schuster Performing Arts Center
19 November 2004^{[AB]}	Baltimore	United States	Meyerhoff Symphony Hall
20 November 2004^{[AB]}	Baltimore	United States	Meyerhoff Symphony Hall
21 November 2004^{[AB]}	Baltimore	United States	Meyerhoff Symphony Hall
21 April 2005	Corona	United States	Stage 1 at Candlewalk
22 April 2005	Pala	United States	Pala Events Center
23 April 2005	Primm	United States	Star of the Desert Arena
24 April 2005	Coarsegold	United States	Half Dome Theater
28 April 2005	Oroville	United States	Cascade Showroom
29 April 2005	Brooks	United States	Cache Creek Casino Resort Event Center
30 April 2005	Reno	United States	Grand Exposition Hall
1 May 2005	Laughlin	United States	Flamingo Outdoor Amphitheater
6 October 2005	Roanoke	United States	Roanoke Performing Arts Theatre
7 October 2005	Lancaster	United States	American Music Theatre
8 October 2005	Lancaster	United States	American Music Theatre
9 October 2005	Red Bank	United States	Count Basie Theatre
11 October 2005	New York City	United States	Nokia Theatre Times Square
13 October 2005	Albany	United States	Palace Theatre
14 October 2005	Verona	United States	Turning Stone Event Center
15 October 2005	Ledyard	United States	Fox Theatre
16 October 2005	Englewood	United States	Bergen Performing Arts Center
20 October 2005	Lowell	United States	Lowell Memorial Auditorium
21 October 2005	Atlantic City	United States	Atlantic City Hilton Theater
22 October 2005	Atlantic City	United States	Atlantic City Hilton Theater
3 November 2005	Joliet	United States	Rialto Square Theatre
4 November 2005	Waukegan	United States	Genesee Theatre
5 November 2005	Cedar Rapids	United States	Paramount Theatre
6 November 2005	Omaha	United States	Civic Auditorium Music Hall
10 November 2005	Hinckley	United States	Hinckley Events & Convention Center
11 November 2005	Hinckley	United States	Hinckley Events & Convention Center
12 November 2005	Wisconsin Dells	United States	Crystal Grand Music Theatre
17 November 2005	Tucson	United States	Diamond Center
18 November 2005^{[AC]}	Mesa	United States	Ikeda Theater
19 November 2005	Los Angeles	United States	Hollywood Palladium
20 November 2005	Palm Desert	United States	McCallum Theatre

Festivals and other miscellaneous performances

^{A} Performance featured the Pittsburgh Symphony Orchestra
^{B} Performance featured the Youngstown Symphony Orchestra
^{C} Performance featured the Knoxville Symphony Pops Orchestra
^{D} Performance featured the Jacksonville Symphony Orchestra
^{E} Performance featured the Houston Symphony Orchestra
^{F} Performance featured the Austin Symphony Orchestra
^{G} Performance featured the Fort Worth Chamber Orchestra
^{H} Performance featured the Arkansas Symphony Orchestra
^{I} Performance featured the New Mexico Symphony Orchestra
^{J} Performance featured the Las Vegas Philharmonic Orchestra
^{K} Performance featured the Omaha Symphony Orchestra
^{L} Performance featured the USC POPS Orchestra
^{M} Performance featured the Augusta Symphony Orchestra
^{N} Performance featured the Charlotte Symphony Orchestra
^{O} Performance featured the Jackson Symphony Orchestra

^{P} Performance featured the Nassau Pops Symphony Orchestra
^{Q} Performance featured the Nashville Symphony Orchestra
^{R} Performance featured the Alabama Symphony Orchestra
^{S} Performance featured the Palm Beach Symphony Orchestra
^{T} Nu Skin Convention
^{U} Colorado State Fair
^{V} Big Spring Jam
^{W} Performance featured the Albany Symphony Orchestra
^{X} Performance featured the Buffalo Philharmonic Orchestra
^{Y} Performance featured the Springfield Symphony Orchestra
^{Z} Performance featured the Grand Rapids Symphony
^{AA} Performance featured the Dayton Philharmonic Orchestra
^{AB} Performance featured the Baltimore Symphony Orchestra
^{AC} Festival of Children Benefit Concert

Cancellations and rescheduled shows

19 August 2003	Albuquerque, New Mexico	Sandia Casino Amphitheater	Cancelled
21 August 2003	Los Angeles, California	Greek Theatre	Rescheduled to 9 October 2003
23 August 2003	Santa Rosa, California	Luther Burbank Center for the Arts	Rescheduled to 4 October 2003
24 August 2003	San Francisco	Davies Symphony Hall	Rescheduled to 5 October 2003
27 August 2003	Seattle	McCaw Hall	Rescheduled to 29 September 2003
29 August 2003	Jacksonville, Oregon	Britt Pavilion	Cancelled
9 October 2003	Los Angeles	Greek Theatre	Cancelled

== Personnel ==
Andy Timmons – Guitar & Vocals
Dan Wojciechowski – Drums
Lee Hendricks – Bass
Catherine Marx – Keyboards
Warren Ham – Horns & Vocals
Steve Real – Vocals
Marlén Landin – Vocals
Carmella Ramsey – Vocals
