= Two of a Kind (1983 film) =

1983 film by John Herzfeld

- Theatrical release poster
- Directed by: John Herzfeld
- Written by: John Herzfeld
- Produced by: Roger M. Rothstein; Joe Wizan
- Starring: John Travolta; Olivia Newton-John; Oliver Reed; Beatrice Straight; Scatman Crothers; Charles Durning
- Cinematography: Fred J. Koenekamp
- Edited by: Jack Hofstra
- Music by: Patrick Williams
- Distributed by: 20th Century-Fox
- Release date: December 16, 1983
- Running time: 88 minutes
- Country: United States
- Language: English
- Budget: $14 million
- Box office: $23,646,952

Two of a Kind is a 1983 American romantic fantasy crime comedy-drama film directed by John Herzfeld and starring John Travolta and Olivia Newton-John. The film reunited Travolta and Newton-John who had appeared together in 1978's Grease. The original musical score was composed by Patrick Williams. Travolta plays cash-strapped inventor Zack Melon while Newton-John plays Debbie Wylder, the bank teller whom he attempts to rob. They must come to show compassion for one another in order to delay God's judgment upon the Earth. Two of a Kind was released by 20th Century-Fox on December 16, 1983. Despite being a critical failure, the film's soundtrack was a commercial success, yielding three hit singles for Newton-John and being certified platinum.

== Plot ==
Four angels—Charlie, Earl, Gonzales, and Ruth—have been in charge of Heaven for the last twenty-five years. They are playing a golf match in Heaven when their game is interrupted by God, who has returned to the office and does not like what he sees down on Earth. God wants to order up another flood and start all over again (despite his promise in the rainbow that he never would again), but the four angels persuade him to reconsider, reasoning that, if a typical Earth man can reform, it would prove that all mankind is capable of it.

God agrees to the scheme, and the typical Earth man selected by the angels is Zack Melon, a failed inventor who, threatened by loan sharks, decides to hold up a bank. Zack points his gun at bank teller Debbie Wylder, who ostensibly gives him all the money. However, when Zack peers into the sack after the robbery, he sees that Debbie has substituted bank deposit slips for the cash and has kept the money for herself. Zack tracks her down to reclaim his stolen money. While dodging the loan sharks and the evil interventions of Beasley, who is actually the Devil, the two come to develop a romantic relationship which is put to the test when they are threatened by a masked thug.

== Cast ==
- John Travolta as Zack Melon
- Olivia Newton-John as Debbie Wylder
- Charles Durning as Charlie
- Oliver Reed as Beasley/The Devil
- Beatrice Straight as Ruth
- Scatman Crothers as Earl
- Richard Bright as Stuart
- Toni Kalem as Terri
- Ernie Hudson as Detective Skaggs
- Jack Kehoe as Mr. Chotiner
- Robert Costanzo as Captain Cinzari
- Cástulo Guerra as Gonzales
- Charles Hallahan as Archbishop (uncredited)
- Gene Hackman as God (uncredited)

== Filming ==
The film was originally called Second Chance and was to be directed by Richard Rush. Principal photography of Two of a Kind took place from May 9 to July 21, 1983, beginning in New York City with two weeks of location shooting and then continuing in California at 20th Century Fox Studios in Century City, MGM Studios in Culver City and The Burbank Studios in Burbank. The heaven scene was shot on MGM's Stage 27.

Director John Herzfeld explained in an interview with Sylvester Stallone that the original cut of the film was considered to be too controversial and included Orson Welles as God. The interview is a special feature on the Blu-ray for Herzfeld's 2 Days in the Valley released by Kino Lorber. Herzfeld said the original cut was never screened for test audiences and upon studio alterations, Gene Hackman was brought in to replace Welles and record new audio for the re-edited film.

Olivia Newton-John recorded a song "Twist of Fate" which was played over the end credits. It proved so popular on radio that composer Patrick Williams was hired to change the score originated by Bill Conti so that it incorporated the song. As a result, a November 1983 press screening was canceled, and the final prints of the film were not available until the week of its Friday, December 16, 1983, opening.

== Reception ==
Roger Ebert gave the film one-and-a-half stars out of four and wrote, "The romance, alas, never really gets airborne, if only because John Travolta, Olivia Newton-John and the plot are followed everywhere by countless unnecessary supporting characters." Janet Maslin of The New York Times asked, "Can it really have been that difficult to find a passable screen vehicle for John Travolta and Olivia Newton-John? Any old romantic fluff should have sufficed, and yet something as horrible as Two of a Kind has been tailor-made for its stars. The results are so disastrous that absolutely no one is shown off to good advantage, with the possible exception of the hairdressers involved." Todd McCarthy of Variety slammed the film as "an embarrassment of the first order ... Aside from the presence of the two stars, confection has all the earmarks of a bargain-basement job."

Gene Siskel of the Chicago Tribune gave the film two-and-a-half stars out of four and wrote that director John Herzfeld "has placed one of America's favorite fantasy couples in a gimmick-filled story that requires the almost-constant presence of seven of the dullest supporting characters you'll ever meet. That's too bad, because whenever Newton-John and Travolta are on screen together, Two of a Kind flashes with a spark of entertainment, and you want to tell them to get up and go to another film where they can have a long talk or makeout scene together."

Sheila Benson of the Los Angeles Times said that with "flaccid direction, ugly photography and performances that rely on charm generated a few movies ago (and sealed in plastic), you have reason enough to give Two of a Kind a wide berth." Rita Kempley of The Washington Post wrote, "The acting's not all that bad, but the script is." FilmInk magazine later wrote the two stars "really shouldn’t have been so snobby about Grease 2 if this is what they did instead."

Two of a Kind was nominated for five Golden Raspberry Awards: Worst Picture, Worst Actor (Travolta, also for Staying Alive), Worst Actress (Newton-John), Worst Director (Herzfeld) and Worst Screenplay (Herzfeld) at the 4th Golden Raspberry Awards. The movie was nominated for a Stinkers Bad Movie Award for Worst Picture at the 1983 Stinkers Bad Movie Awards.

As of November 2022, the film holds a 17% rating on Rotten Tomatoes based on 12 reviews. Audiences polled by CinemaScore gave the film an average grade of "C" on an A+ to F scale.

== Soundtrack ==
The film was salvaged by a platinum soundtrack which yielded three singles for Newton-John:

- "Twist of Fate" - No. 5 Billboard Hot 100 (her last of 15 Top 10 Pop hits)
- "Take a Chance" (duet with Travolta) - No. 3 Adult Contemporary (B-side to "Twist of Fate")
- "Livin' in Desperate Times" - No. 31 Billboard Hot 100

The album was further bolstered by featuring "Ask the Lonely", a song which the rock group Journey had initially intended for their 1983 album Frontiers but which was only available on the soundtrack album (No. 3 Mainstream Rock); it was also added to the playlist of a few pop stations but did not chart there. Additionally included was Patti Austin's "It's Gonna Be Special", which was not a major pop hit, but peaked at #15 on the R&B chart and #5 on the Dance chart in 1984.
