= Livin' in Desperate Times =

Single by Olivia Newton-John

from the album Two of a Kind
- B-side: "Landslide"
- Released: February 1984
- Recorded: 1983
- Genre: Pop; pop rock; synth pop; new wave
- Length: 4:03 (7" single (Re-mixed) version); 4:14 (Soundtrack version); 4:03 (Alternate Soundtrack version); 6:41 (Extended version); 4:47 (Humberto's Alternate Mix)
- Label: MCA
- Songwriters: Tom Snow; Barry Alfonso
- Producer: David Foster

Olivia Newton-John US singles chronology
"Twist of Fate" / "Take a Chance" (1983)	"Livin' in Desperate Times" (1984)	"Face to Face" (1984)

Music video
- "Livin' in Desperate Times" on YouTube

"Livin' in Desperate Times" is a song recorded by British-Australian singer Olivia Newton-John for the soundtrack to the 1983 film Two of a Kind. Written by Tom Snow and Barry Alfonso and produced by David Foster, the song was released as the second single from the album in Australia, Canada and the US but was only moderately successful.

== Release and commercial performance ==
The Two of a Kind soundtrack was released in November 1983 with a version of "Livin' in Desperate Times" that ran 4:14. A remix of the song was released as a 7-inch single in February 1984 with a running time of 4:03. The 7-inch single made its debut on the Billboard Hot 100 in the issue of the magazine dated 11 February 1984 and peaked at number 31 during its 10 weeks there. It also reached number 43 in Canada and number 81 in Australia.

== Critical reception ==
The editors of Billboard magazine wrote that the song "continues the pattern of "Fame" and "Maniac"; fast-paced techno-pulse plus achievement-against-all-odds lyrics result in huge chart hit."

== Music video ==
The music video for "Livin' in Desperate Times" was directed by Brian Grant and filmed at England's Shepperton Studios. The set is filled with enormous three-dimensional letters forming words that reflect the subject matter of the song such as anger and greed. Newton-John performs the song alongside members of a dance troupe while involved in highly-charged situations. In a review of the collection of videos for Newton-John's songs from Two of a Kind titled Twist of Fate, Paul Grein of Billboard wrote that the videos for "Livin' in Desperate Times" and the bonus song "Heart Attack" were "both manic, broadly-played clips which mirror the frantic pace of the records."

The Twist of Fate collection was nominated for Best Video, Short Form at the 27th Annual Grammy Awards but lost to David Bowie's Jazzin' for Blue Jean.

== Track listing and formats ==
"Livin' in Desperate Times" and "Twist of Fate" were engineered and mixed by Humberto Gatica.

- 7-inch single
1. "Livin' in Desperate Times" (Re-mixed Version) – 4:03
2. "Landslide" – 3:50
- 12-inch single
1. "Livin' in Desperate Times" (Extended Version) – 6:36
2. "Twist of Fate" (Extended Version) – 5:18

== Charts ==
Chart performance for “Livin' in Desperate Times"
Chart (1984)	Peak position
Australia (Kent Music Report)	81
Canada Top Singles (RPM)	43
US Billboard Hot 100	31
US Cash Box Top 100	29
Quebec (ADISQ)	33

== Bibliography ==
- O'Neil, Thomas (1999), The Grammys, Perigree Books, ISBN 0-399-52477-0
