= Just the Two of Us: The Duets Collection (Vol. 2) =

Compilation album by Olivia Newton-John
- Released: 6 October 2023
- Recorded: 1979–2018
- Genre: Pop
- Label: Primary Wave
- Producer: Various

Olivia Newton-John chronology
Just the Two of Us: The Duets Collection (Vol. 1) (2023)	Just the Two of Us: The Duets Collection (Vol. 2) (2023)

Just the Two of Us: The Duets Collection (Vol. 2) is a posthumous compilation album by Australian singer Olivia Newton-John. It was announced in August 2023 and released on 6 October 2023 by Primary Wave. It is the second collection of duets performed by Newton-John during her career.

== Track listing ==
Just the Two of Us: The Duets Collection (Vol. 2) track listing
No.	Title	Writer(s)	Producer(s)	Length
1.	"Dare To Dream" (with John Farnham) (originally released on "The Games Of The XXVII Olympiad 2000: Music from the Opening Ceremony" in 2000)	Paul Begaud, Vanessa Corish, Wayne Tester	John Farnham, Ross Fraser, Chong Lim	4:58
2.	"Everybody's Someone" (with Cliff Richard) (originally released on Richard's "Rise Up" in 2018)	Martin Sutton, Christopher Neil	Rupert Christie	3:46
3.	"Rest Your Love on Me" (with Andy Gibb) (originally released on Gibb's "After Dark" in 1980)	Barry Gibb	Barry Gibb, Albhy Galuten, Karl Richardson	5:00
4.	"Wishin' and Hopin'" (with Dionne Warwick) (originally released on Warwick's "My Friends & Me" in 2006)	Burt Bacharach; Hal David		3:05
5.	"Getting Better All the Time" (with Marie Osmond) (originally released on Osmond's "Music Is Medicine" in 2016)	Jennifer Denmark; Molly Reed	Jason Deere, Marie Osmond	3:05
6.	"Falling" (with Raybon Brothers) (originally released on Raybon Brother's 'Raybon Brothers' in 1997)	Lenny LeBlanc; Eddie Struzick	Tony Brown, Don Kirby Cook	3:19
7.	"Cotton Jenny" (with Anne Murray) (originally released on Murray's Anne Murray Duets: Friends & Legends" in 2007)	Gordon Lightfoot	Phil Ramone	3:24
8.	"I’m Counting on You" (with Johnny O'Keefe) (originally released on "2" in 2002 )	Alicia Evelyn	Charles Fisher	2:33
9.	"Tenterfield Saddler" (with Peter Allen) (originally released on "2" in 2002)	Peter Allen	Charles Fisher	4:09
10.	"I Will Be Right Here" (with David Campbell) (originally released on "2" in 2002)	Dianne Warren	Charles Fisher	4:27
11.	"You Have to Believe" (with Dave Audé and Chloe Lattanzi) (released in 2015)	John Farrar, Dave Audé, Chloe Lattanzi and Vasiliki Karagiorgos; Jason Michael Robinson	Dave Audé	3:55

== Charts ==
Chart performance for Just the Two of Us: The Duets Collection (Vol. 2)
Chart (2023)	Peak position
Scottish Albums (Official Charts)	91
UK Album Sales (OCC)	49
US Top Album Sales (Billboard)	60

== See also ==
- (2) – Newton-John's 2002 duets album
- A Celebration in Song – Newton-John's 2008 duets album
