= Take a Chance (Olivia Newton-John and John Travolta song) =

- Side-B label of US 7-inch vinyl release of "Twist of Fate" b/w "Take a Chance"

Single by Olivia Newton-John and John Travolta

from the album Two of a Kind
- A-side: "Twist of Fate" (Canada & US)
- B-side: "Love Make Me Strong" (Australia); "Silvery Rain" (UK)
- Released: October 1983
- Recorded: 1983
- Genre: Pop; easy listening
- Length: 4:09
- Label: Interfusion (Australia); MCA (Canada & US); EMI (UK)
- Songwriter: David Foster, Steve Lukather, Olivia Newton-John
- Producer: David Foster

Olivia Newton-John UK singles chronology
"Twist of Fate" (1983)	"Take a Chance" (1983)	"Soul Kiss" (1985)

Olivia Newton-John US singles chronology
"Tied Up" (1983)	"Twist of Fate" / "Take a Chance" (1983)	"Livin' in Desperate Times" (1984)

Music video
- "Take a Chance" on YouTube

"Take a Chance" is a song recorded by British-Australian singer Olivia Newton-John and American actor John Travolta. It was written for their 1983 film Two of a Kind by David Foster, Steve Lukather and Newton-John. The song was released in October 1983. It performed well on the Adult Contemporary charts in the US and Canada.

== Background ==
In 1978 John Travolta and Olivia Newton-John starred in Grease, a big-screen adaptation of the 1972 Broadway musical of the same name. Its success elicited offers to reunite them in another film; Travolta read the screenplay for Two of a Kind and persuaded Newton-John to star in it with him. In "Take a Chance" they sing about the new relationship their characters have started.

== Release and commercial performance ==
In the US and Canada, "Take a Chance" was released in October 1983 as the B-side of the first 7-inch single from the Two of a Kind soundtrack, "Twist of Fate". In the US, "Take a Chance" debuted on Billboard magazine's Adult Contemporary chart in the issue dated 26 November 1983 and peaked at number 3 during its 17 weeks there. In Canada, it hit number one on RPM magazine's Adult Contemporary chart.

== Critical reception ==
In their review of the soundtrack album, the editors of RPM wrote that Newton-John "makes Travolta sound not too bad" on their one song together.

== Music video ==
The music video for "Take a Chance" features Newton-John and Travolta singing to each other and dancing on a soundstage. It was directed by David Mallet and included on a video collection of Newton-John's songs from Two of a Kind titled Twist of Fate. In a review of the collection for Billboard, Paul Grein wrote of the duet, "The video is a soft-focus valentine, which suits the wispy nature of the song, but also serves to make the overall package excessively slushy and syrupy. The one grace note is that the clip features inventive choreography by John Travolta."

The Twist of Fate collection was nominated for Best Video, Short Form at the 27th Annual Grammy Awards but lost to David Bowie's Jazzin' for Blue Jean.

== Lawsuit ==
In 1987, songwriter Laura Taylor Siskind sued the performers and songwriters of "Take a Chance", claiming it was based on a demo she submitted to the same company that recorded a song of hers on which "Take a Chance" songwriter Steve Lukather played guitar. A judge found there was nothing to support the claim of copyright infringement and dismissed the case.

== Track listing and formats ==
- Australian 7-inch vinyl single (Interfusion Records)
1. "Take a Chance" (Foster, Steve Lukather, Newton-John) – 4:09
2. "Love Make Me Strong" (Terry Britten, Sue Shifrin) – 3:09
- UK 7-inch vinyl single (EMI Records)
1. "Take a Chance"
2. "Silvery Rain" (Hank Marvin) – 3:40
- US/Canadian 7-inch vinyl single (MCA Records)
1. "Twist of Fate" (Peter Beckett, Steve Kipner) – 3:39
2. "Take a Chance"

== Charts ==
=== Weekly charts ===
Weekly chart performance for "Take a Chance"
Chart (1984)	Peak position
Canada Adult Contemporary (RPM)	1
US Billboard Adult Contemporary	3

=== Year-end charts ===
Year-end chart performance for "Take a Chance"
Chart (1984)	Position
US Billboard Adult Contemporary	46

== Certifications and sales ==
Certifications and sales for "Take a Chance"
Region	Certification	Certified units/sales
Canada (Music Canada)	Gold	50,000^{^}
^{^} Shipments figures based on certification alone.

== Bibliography ==
- O'Neil, Thomas (1999), The Grammys, Perigree Books, ISBN 0-399-52477-0
