= Spin (Everybody's Doin' It) =

Single by Vanessa Amorosi

from the album Change
- Released: 28 October 2002
- Recorded: 2002
- Genre: Dance-rock; soul
- Length: 3:04
- Label: CBK; Transistor; Universal
- Songwriters: Jany Schella; Anders Barrén; J. Olsson; D. Pashley
- Producers: Jany Schella; Anders Barrén

Vanessa Amorosi singles chronology
"One Thing Leads 2 Another" (2002)	"Spin (Everybody's Doin' It)" (2002)	"True to Yourself" (2003)

"Spin (Everybody's Doin' It)" is a song by Australian singer Vanessa Amorosi. The song was released in Australia on 28 October 2002 as an Australian only single. It was the sole Australian single release from Amorosi's second studio album Change and it peaked at 34 on the ARIA charts.

== Track listing ==
#	"Spin (Everybody's Doin' It)"	Time
1.	"Spin (Everybody's Doin' It)" (UK radio edit)	03:04
2.	"Spin (Everybody's Doin' It)" ([Love] Tattoo vs Curt remix radio edit)	03:00
3.	"Spin (Everybody's Doin' It)" ([Love] Tattoo vs Curt extended remix)	04:26
4.	"Dream" (Radio edit)	03:44

== Charts ==
Chart (2002)	Peak position
Australia (ARIA)	34

== Release history ==
Region	Date	Label	Catalogue
Australia	28 October 2002	Transistor Music	SCBK660
