= Love Theme from St. Elmo's Fire =

"Love Theme from St. Elmo's Fire (Instrumental)"

Single by David Foster

from the album St. Elmo's Fire and David Foster
- B-side: "Georgetown"
- Released: 1985
- Recorded: 1984
- Genre: Instrumental
- Length: 3:30
- Label: Atlantic
- Songwriter: David Foster
- Producer: David Foster

"Love Theme from St. Elmo's Fire" is the theme from the 1985 film St. Elmo's Fire by David Foster. It was performed in two versions: one as an instrumental by Foster (released as a single) and another with lyrics added by Cynthia Weil and performed as a duet by Amy Holland and Donny Gerrard, subtitled "For Just a Moment".

== Release ==
Released as a single in the United States, the instrumental version of the theme reached No. 15 on the Billboard Hot 100, and No. 3 on the Adult Contemporary chart. It eventually saw regular airplay on Smooth Jazz radio stations as well.

== Personnel ==
- David Foster - keyboards
- David Boruff - saxophone
- Tris Imboden - drums

== Chart performance ==
=== Weekly charts ===
Weekly chart performance for "Love Theme from St. Elmo's Fire"
| Chart (1985–1986) | Peak position |
|---|---|
| Australia (Kent Music Report) | 22 |
| Canada Top Singles (RPM) | 7 |
| Canada Adult Contemporary (RPM) | 2 |
| US Billboard Hot 100 | 15 |
| US Adult Contemporary (Billboard) | 3 |

=== Year-end charts ===
Year-end chart performance for "Love Theme from St. Elmo's Fire"
| Chart (1985-1986) | Position |
|---|---|
| Australia (Kent Music Report) | 96 |
| Canada (RPM) | 83 |
