= David Foster (album) =

Studio album by David Foster
- Released: June 11, 1986
- Recorded: 1985–1986
- Studios: Lighthouse Studios (North Hollywood, California); Lion Share Studios and Studio 55 (Los Angeles, California)
- Genres: AOR, pop rock, adult contemporary
- Length: 40:54
- Label: Atlantic
- Producers: David Foster; Humberto Gatica

David Foster chronology
| The Best of Me (1983) | David Foster (1986) | The Symphony Sessions (1988) |

Singles from David Foster
- 1. "Love Theme from St. Elmo's Fire" Released: 1985; 2. "The Best of Me" Released: 1986; 3. "Who's Gonna Love You Tonight" Released: 1986

Professional ratings
Review scores
| Source | Rating |
|---|---|
| Allmusic | 3/5 stars |

David Foster is the second solo studio album by David Foster, released in 1986. The album is mainly instrumental with two duet-style songs featuring rare vocals from Foster himself. This work led to Foster receiving the Juno Award for "Instrumental Artist of the Year" in 1986 and 1987, and a Grammy Award nomination for "Best Pop Instrumental Performance" in 1986. Co-producer Humberto Gatica was also nominated for a Grammy Award in 1986 for "Best Engineered Recording" for this album.

== Background and writing ==
After producing numerous commercially successful albums for other artists during the 1980s, David Foster released his first major label debut in 1986. The album features many of Foster's friends and collaborators from the Los Angeles-area studio musician scene who had worked with him on previous releases including his first solo album "The Best of Me" and the St. Elmo's Fire soundtrack.

The first track is the instrumental version of the "Love Theme" from the 1985 film St. Elmo's Fire, which also appears on the film's soundtrack. Foster received a Juno Award for "Producer of the Year" for that album in 1986. A video was produced for this song, featuring a storyline where Foster is writing the song on piano interspersed with scenes of him pursuing a girl riding on horseback.

The second track is from the 1985 Spielberg film The Color Purple. The CD soundtrack for this film features a different track entitled "High Life/Proud Theme" (1:12), and it is not clear if this version actually appears in the movie. The song was composed by award-winning producer Quincy Jones, his frequent co-writer Rod Temperton and arranger Jeremy Lubbock. All three were nominated for the Academy Award for "Original Music Score" in 1985 for their work on this soundtrack.

The third track "Flight of the Snowbirds" is inspired by the Canadian Forces Snowbirds aerobatic flying team. Foster was subsequently made an honorary member of the Snowbirds.

The fourth track, "All That My Heart Can Hold," would be covered with Spanish lyrics by singer Luis Miguel as "Ayer" (Yesterday). "Ayer" was the first single released from his Grammy-winning album, Aries, and was also a #1 hit in both Mexico and the US. It also would be covered by Wendy Moten from her album Time for Change, with lyrics written by Linda Thompson.

The fifth track "The Best of Me" is the first vocal song on the album featuring a duet between Olivia Newton-John and Foster. The two had previously worked together on the 1983 Two of a Kind soundtrack, including the songs "Take a Chance" and "Shakin' You". This soft rock single was a Top 10 hit on the Billboard AC charts in the U.S. and a Top 40 hit in Canada. The accompanying music video features Newton-John and Foster singing and playfully spending time together in his home recording studio. Foster's co-writers on this song are Jeremy Lubbock and Richard Marx who would provide background vocals on other Foster productions before becoming a major solo artist on his own.

The sixth track "tapDANCE" is from the 1985 film White Nights starring Gregory Hines. Hines provides the tap dancing heard in this song, likely from a scene in the movie.

The seventh track "Who's Gonna Love You Tonight" is the second song featuring vocals, with Foster and Richard Page who is best known as the lead vocalist for Mr. Mister (of "Broken Wings" fame). This pop rock-style song was written with well-known lyricist John Bettis and Keith Diamond. The song was later briefly featured in the 1989 film, "Listen to Me." The song was also released as a single.

The instruments used in the recording of this album were considered cutting-edge technology at the time, including the newly invented synthaxe guitar, as well as host of synthesizers and sequencers including the Wendell Junior, Kurzweil K250, Fairlight, PPG Wave 2.3 with Waveterm, MIDI Minimoog, Roland Jupiter-8, Emulator 3, Yamaha DX Series, Yamaha 9 ft. grand piano with Jim Wilson MIDI system, Oberheim Matrix 12, the Oberheim System and the Linn LM-1 drum machine with A.M.S.

== Reception ==
JA of Keyboard praised the album for its "impeccable production", but noted that only "tapDance" and "Playing With Fire" feature a contemporary sound.

== Track listing ==
| No. | Title | Writer(s) | Length |
|---|---|---|---|
| 1. | "Love Theme from St. Elmo's Fire" (Instrumental) | Foster | 3:28 |
| 2. | "Theme from The Color Purple (Mailbox/Proud Theme)" | Quincy Jones; Rod Temperton; Jeremy Lubbock | 3:45 |
| 3. | "Flight of the Snowbirds" | Foster; Lubbock | 5:26 |
| 4. | "All That My Heart Can Hold" | Foster; Lubbock; Richard Marx | 3:54 |
| 5. | "The Best of Me" | Foster; Lubbock; Marx | 4:09 |
| 6. | "tapDANCE" | Foster; Jerry Hey; Tommy Keane | 4:02 |
| 7. | "Who's Gonna Love You Tonight" | John Bettis; Keith Diamond; Foster | 3:52 |
| 8. | "Elizabeth" | Foster; Keane | 4:22 |
| 9. | "Playing with Fire" | Foster; Michael Landau | 4:30 |
| 10. | "Sajé" | Foster | 3:08 |

== Album credits ==
=== Personnel ===
- David Foster – keyboards, vocals, arrangements, horn arrangements (6)
- Will Alexander – synthesizer programming
- Michael Boddicker – synthesizer programming
- David Boruff – synthesizer programming, saxophone solos
- Marcus Ryle – synthesizer programming
- Andrew Thomas – synthesizer programming
- Bo Tomlyn – synthesizer programming
- Randy Waldman – synthesizer programming
- Michael Landau – guitars
- Lee Ritenour – SynthAxe (9)
- Tris Imboden – drum overdubs
- Carlos Vega – additional drum overdubs
- Gregory Hines – taps (6)
- Gary Herbig – saxophone solo (6)
- Larry Williams – horns (6)
- Bill Reichenbach Jr. – horns (6)
- Chuck Findley – horns (6)
- Gary Grant – horns (6)
- Jerry Hey – horns (6), horn arrangements
- Chicago horns – James Pankow, Walter Parazaider and Lee Loughnane (9)
- Olivia Newton-John – vocals (5)
- Richard Page – backing vocals (7)

=== Production ===
- David Foster – producer
- Humberto Gatica – producer, engineer (1–5, 7–10), mixing
- Tommy Vicari – engineer (6)
- Larry Ferguson – second engineer
- Rick Holbrook – second engineer
- Glen Holguin – second engineer
- Laura Livingston – second engineer
- Claudio Ordenes – second engineer
- Woody Woodruff – second engineer
- Bernie Grundman – LP mastering at Bernie Grundman Mastering (Hollywood, California)
- Barry Diament – CD mastering at Atlantic Studios (New York City, New York)
- Chris Earthy – project coordinator
- Peter Hallat – coordinating assistant
- Bob Defrin – art direction
- Jodi Rovin – design
- Aaron Rapoport – photography

== Charts ==
| Chart (1986) | Peak position |
|---|---|
| Canada Top Albums/CDs (RPM) | 40 |
| US Billboard 200 | 195 |
