= True to Yourself =

Single by Vanessa Amorosi

from the album Change
- Released: 24 February 2003
- Recorded: 2002
- Genre: Pop, downtempo
- Length: 3:41
- Label: Universal Music
- Songwriters: Gary Barlow, Andy Murray, Sylvia Bennett Smith, Jane Vaughan
- Producer: Andy Murray/Christian Ballard

Vanessa Amorosi singles chronology
"Spin (Everybody's Doin' It)" (2002)	"True to Yourself" (2003)	"Kiss Your Mama!" (2007)

"True to Yourself" is a German-only release by Australian singer Vanessa Amorosi, taken from her second studio album Change. The single was released on 24 February 2003 as the album's final single and peaked at No.99.

It was included on the Top of the Pops 2003 compilation album.

In 2002, Amorosi re-recorded the song as a duet with Olivia Newton-John and it was to be included on Newton-John's album 2 (as track two). However, the track was dropped at the last minute due to contractual disagreements between Amorosi's Transistor Music and Newton-John's Universal Music labels. Both declared to feel very sad about this situation and have been quick to say that there is no problem between them, but that it is simply a contractual matter. In March 2023, Vanessa and Olivia's duet version of the song turned the light, as the song was finally released on Olivia's posthumous duets album Just the Two of Us: The Duets Collection (Vol. 1).

== Lyrics ==
Lyrically, the song is about self-empowerment. The chorus includes the lyrics; "Sometimes you gotta look a little harder, Sometimes you gotta be, be smarter, Hold on just a little bit longer, Just be true to yourself"

== Promotion ==
Amorosi performed "True to Yourself" on Top of the Pops and the hugely successful long-running show Wetten, dass..? which screens throughout Europe.

== Track listing ==
CD Maxi

#	Title	Time
1.	"True to Yourself"	3:41
2.	"Spin (Everybody's Doin' It)"	3:04
3.	"Sometimes Happiness"	4:55

== Charts ==
Chart (2003)	Peak position
Germany (GfK)	99

== Release history ==
Region	Date	Label	Catalogue
Germany	February 2003	Universal Music	019 855-2
