= Two of a Kind (soundtrack) =

1983 film soundtrack

Soundtrack album by Olivia Newton-John / Various artists
- Released: 9 November 1983
- Recorded: 1983
- Studios: Soundcastle, Sunset Sound (Hollywood), The Lighthouse (North Hollywood), Record One, Studio 55 (Los Angeles), Fantasy Studios (Berkeley)
- Genres: Pop, pop rock, easy listening
- Length: 40:49
- Label: MCA
- Producers: David Foster; Humberto Gatica; Quincy Jones; Steve Kipner; David Paich; Jeff Porcaro; Mike Stone; Kevin Elson

Olivia Newton-John chronology
Olivia's Greatest Hits Vol. 2 (1982)	Two of a Kind (1983)	Soul Kiss (1985)

Singles from Two of a Kind
- 1. "Twist of Fate" Released: October 1983; 2. "Take a Chance" Released: October 1983; 3. "Ask the Lonely" Released: November 1983; 4. "It's Gonna Be Special" Released: January 1984; 5. "Livin' in Desperate Times" Released: February 1984; 6. "Night Music" Released: March 1984

Two of a Kind: Music from the Original Motion Picture Soundtrack is the soundtrack album of the film of the same name, released in 1983 by MCA Records and featuring four songs by the film's star Olivia Newton-John, including a duet with her co-star, John Travolta, and the top five hit "Twist of Fate". Songs from other artists on the album also charted. In the US it was certified Platinum by the Recording Industry Association of America.

== Background ==
In 1978 John Travolta and Olivia Newton-John starred in Grease, a big-screen adaptation of the 1972 Broadway musical of the same name. Its success elicited offers to reunite them in another film; Travolta read the screenplay for Two of a Kind and persuaded Newton-John to star in it with him. The film was profitable despite the criticism it received.

== Commercial performance ==
In the United States, the album debuted on Billboard magazine's Top LPs & Tape chart in the issue dated 3 December 1983 and spent 20 weeks there, during which time it peaked at number 26. It also reached number 6 on their US Rock Albums chart, number 29 in Japan, number 30 in Canada and number 33 in Australia. On 16 January 1984 it received Platinum certification by the RIAA.

== Singles ==
Newton-John's "Twist of Fate" was the first release from the album. In the US and Canada, it was the A-side of the 7-inch single and distributed to Top 40 radio stations; "Take a Chance", her duet with Travolta, was the B-side and was distributed to adult contemporary stations. "Twist of Fate" peaked at number 5 on both the Billboard Hot 100 in the US and the RPM list of the top 50 pop singles in Canada. It also reached number 4 in Australia and number 5 in South Africa and charted in several other countries. (Note: "Twist of Fate" also reached number 20 in Switzerland, number 22 in New Zealand, number 33 in Belgium, number 42 in the Netherlands and number 57 in the UK.) "Take a Chance" performed well on the Adult Contemporary charts, reaching number 1 in Canada and number 3 in the US. It was released in the UK in February 1984 and in Australia that May.

Four other songs from the soundtrack also charted. "Ask the Lonely" by Journey was originally intended for their 1983 album Frontiers but was pulled because of time constraints. It debuted on Billboard's Top Tracks chart for rock songs in the 3 December 1983 issue and peaked at number 3 during its 12 weeks there. "It's Gonna Be Special" by Patti Austin made its first appearance in Billboard in the 4 February 1984 issue on its Hot Black Singles chart, where it peaked at number 15 during a 14-week run. It also peaked at number 5 on its dance chart and number 82 on the Hot 100. Also in February, Newton-John's "(Livin' in) Desperate Times" was released in the US, where it reached number 31 on the Hot 100, and Australia, where it peaked at number 81. "Night Music" by David Foster reached number 22 during a run on the Adult Contemporary chart in Canada that began in March 1984.

== Reception ==
Professional ratings
Review scores
Source	Rating
AllMusic	2.5/5 stars

In their review, the editors of Billboard wrote, "Most of the material is sprightly and sassy, reflecting the direction in which Newton-John has been steadily moving in recent years." Cashbox felt that the album

represents more a collection of singles than an actual soundtrack... The record does, however, have a unified sound since David Foster produced most of the tracks. The songs fit into the AOR/Adult Contemporary league although many of the tracks, especially the Newton-John songs, have a rougher, more upbeat feel for the dance-oriented market.

Allmusic gave the album a mixed review, stating that

the soundtrack to Two of a Kind is devoted to forced mainstream pop and soft rock, none of which is as memorable as the hits from Newton-John's Physical. Her three hits from the soundtrack - "Twist of Fate," "Take a Chance," "Livin' in Desperate Times" - are not bad, but they're surrounded by filler from Patti Austin, Steve Kipner, Boz Scaggs, Chicago and David Foster; only Journey's "Ask the Lonely" offers enjoyably trashy mainstream pop. As a result, the soundtrack falls flat, functioning only as a reasonably entertaining pop artifact from the early '80s.

== Track listing ==
Side one
No.	Title	Writer(s)	Performer	Length
1.	"Twist of Fate"	Peter Beckett, Steve Kipner	Olivia Newton-John	3:44
2.	"Take a Chance"	David Foster, Steve Lukather, Newton-John	Newton-John and John Travolta	4:09
3.	"It's Gonna Be Special"	Glen Ballard, Clif Magness	Patti Austin	4:14
4.	"Catch 22 (2 Steps Forward, 3 Steps Back)"	Kipner, John L. Parker	Steve Kipner	3:34
5.	"Shaking You"	Foster, Paul Gordon, Tom Keane	Newton-John	4:16
Total length:				19:57

Side two
No.	Title	Writer(s)	Performer	Length
6.	"(Livin' in) Desperate Times"	Barry Alfonso, Tom Snow	Newton-John	4:06
7.	"The Perfect One"	Foster, Boz Scaggs	Boz Scaggs	4:31
8.	"Ask the Lonely"	Jonathan Cain, Steve Perry	Journey	3:56
9.	"Prima Donna"	Peter Cetera, Mark Goldenberg	Chicago	4:28
10.	"Night Music" (instrumental)	Foster	David Foster	3:51
Total length:				20:52

== Personnel ==
Credits adapted from the liner notes for the 1998 reissue.

- David Foster – producer (tracks 1, 2, 5, 6, 7, 9, 10), executive producer (track 4), album coordinator
- Humberto Gatica – producer (track 4), engineer (tracks 1, 2, 4, 6, 7, 9), mixer (tracks 1, 2, 4, 5, 6, 7, 9, 10)
- Quincy Jones – producer (track 3)
- Steve Kipner – producer (track 4)
- David Paich – producer (track 7)
- Jeff Porcaro – producer (track 7)
- Mike Stone – producer (track 8), engineer (track 8)
- Kevin Elson – producer (track 8)
- Roger Davies – album coordinator, Newton-John manager
- Ian Eales – engineer (tracks 5, 10)
- Jeremy Lubbock – string arrangement (tracks 2, 5)
- Marty Paich – string arrangement (track 7)
- John L. Parker – arranger (track 4)
- Tommy Vicari – engineer (track 3), mixer (track 3)
- Stephen Marcussen – mastering
- Mastered at Precision Lacquer (Hollywood)

=== Original release ===
- George Osaki – art direction
- Norman Moore – art direction, package design
- Herb Ritts – cover and inner spread photographs
- Patrick Demarchelier – back cover
- Armando Cosio – Newton-John hair and makeup
- Rico – Travolta hair

=== Reissue ===
- Vartan – art direction
- Anabel Sinn – design
- Andy McKaie – coordinator
- Theresa Malham – digital remastering
- Digitally remastered at MCA Music Media Studios (North Hollywood)

== Charts ==
Chart performance for Two of a Kind
Chart (1983–1984)	Peak position
Australian Albums (Kent Music Report)	33
Canada Top Albums/CDs (RPM)	30
Japanese Albums (Oricon)	29
US Billboard Rock Albums	6
US Billboard 200	26
US Cash Box Top Albums	20

== Certifications and sales ==
Certifications and sales for Two of a Kind
Region	Certification	Certified units/sales
Japan	—	85,120
United States (RIAA)	Platinum	1,000,000^{^}
^{^} Shipments figures based on certification alone.

== Twist of Fate video ==
Twist of Fate

Video by Olivia Newton-John
- Released: 1983
- Recorded: 1983
- Genre: Music video
- Length: 25 minutes
- Label: MCA Home Video
- Directors: Brian Grant, David Mallet
- Producers: Chrissie Smith, Frank Hilton

Olivia Newton-John chronology
Olivia in Concert (1983)	Twist of Fate (1983)	Soul Kiss (1985)

Twist of Fate is a 1983 video collection of the music videos from the Two of a Kind soundtrack by Olivia Newton-John. The video was released on VHS and LaserDisc by MCA Home Video. All videos of standard release are directed by Brian Grant except for "Take a Chance", which was directed by David Mallet. The collection was nominated for Best Short Form Music Video at the 27th Annual Grammy Awards but lost to David Bowie's Jazzin' for Blue Jean.

=== Track listing ===
No.	Title	Length
1.	"Twist of Fate"	3:43
2.	"Take a Chance" (w/ John Travolta)	4:09
3.	"Livin' in Desperate Times"	4:07
4.	"Shaking You"	4:15

US / LaserDisc release bonus tracks
No.	Title	Length
5.	"Heart Attack" (from Olivia's Greatest Hits Vol. 2)	3:07
6.	"Tied Up" (from Olivia's Greatest Hits Vol. 2)	4:32

UK release bonus tracks
No.	Title	Length
5.	"Introductions by John Travolta and Olivia Newton-John"

== Bibliography ==
- O'Neil, Thomas (1999), The Grammys, Perigree Books, ISBN 0-399-52477-0
