= One Thing Leads 2 Another =

Single by Vanessa Amorosi

from the album Change
- Released: 14 October 2002
- Recorded: 2002
- Genre: Pop
- Length: 3:18
- Label: Urban Music; Universal
- Songwriters: Vanessa Amorosi; Mark Holden; Axel Breitung
- Producer: Axel Breitung

Vanessa Amorosi singles chronology
"Turn to Me" (2001)	"One Thing Leads 2 Another" (2002)	"Spin (Everybody's Doin' It)" (2002)

"One Thing Leads 2 Another" is a song by Australian recording artist Vanessa Amorosi, released on 14 October 2002 as the lead single from Amorosi's second studio album Change.

In November 2002, Amorosi sang her song "One Thing Leads 2 Another" at a charity concert in Frankfurt am Main. Other celebrity participants were Sarah Connor, Nena, Oli P., Peter Maffay, DJ Bobo, Isabel, Katy Karrenbauer, Rosenstolz, Ben, ATC, Pierre, B3, Band Ohne Namen, Bell Book and Candle, Laith Al-Deen, Marlon, The Flames, She Loe, Rednex, Lutricia McNeal and the Kelly Family. The "Charity 2002" yielded net proceeds of approximately 500.000,00 euro for children with cancer. All proceeds went to the "Hand in Hand for Children" association.

Paulini Curuenavuli covered "One Thing Leads 2 Another", which was featured on the Australian Idol: The Final 12 album, released in 2003. The song was written by Mark Holden, who was a judge on the show.

== Music video ==
The video clip for "One Thing Leads 2 Another" was shot in September 2002 at the Tempodrom arena in Berlin.

== Track listing ==
CD single
No.	Title	Writer(s)	Length
1.	"One Thing Leads 2 Another" (radio edit)	Amorosi/Holden/Breitung	3:18
2.	"Dream"	Amorosi/Holden/Klarmann/Weber	3:46
3.	"One Thing Leads 2 Another" (pop version)	Amorosi/Holden/Breitung	3:44
4.	"One Thing Leads 2 Another" (instrumental version)	Amorosi/Holden/Breitung	3:13

== Charts ==
Chart (2002)	Peak position
Germany (GfK)	67
Switzerland (Schweizer Hitparade)	62

== Release history ==
Region	Date	Label	Catalogue
Europe	October 2002	Urban Music / Universal Music	019469-2
