= Olivia's Greatest Hits Vol. 2 =

Compilation album by Olivia Newton-John
- Released: 3 September 1982
- Genre: Pop
- Length: 35:54
- Labels: MCA; EMI
- Producers: John Farrar; Jeff Lynne

Olivia Newton-John chronology
| Physical (1981) | Olivia's Greatest Hits Vol. 2 (1982) | Two of a Kind (1983) |

Singles from Olivia's Greatest Hits Vol. 2
- 1. "Heart Attack" Released: August 1982; 2. "Tied Up" Released: January 1983

Olivia's Greatest Hits Vol. 2 (titled Olivia's Greatest Hits Vol. 3 in Australasia) is a greatest hits album by Olivia Newton-John released on 3 September 1982. It was her second greatest hits album released in North America and her third in other territories, following First Impressions and Olivia Newton-John's Greatest Hits.

The compilation includes most of Newton-John's singles released since Olivia Newton-John's Greatest Hits (1977), drawing from her subsequent studio albums and soundtracks. It also included two new recordings, "Heart Attack" and "Tied Up", both recorded during the sessions for her 1981 album Physical.

The album was a commercial success, reaching No. 16 on the US Billboard 200, where it spent over 80 weeks, and No. 1 in Australia. It was certified double platinum in the United States, five-times platinum in Canada, and platinum in the United Kingdom.

== Album details ==
The album includes songs released by the singer between 1978 and 1982. The North American edition contains ten tracks while other editions contain fourteen tracks. The two new songs ("Heart Attack" and "Tied Up") were released as singles to promote the album and reached numbers 3 and 38 on the US pop charts, respectively. An album with similar cover art titled Olivia's Greatest Hits was released simultaneously in Europe (excluding Scandinavia) and certain Asian and Latin American territories. This compilation fully spanned Newton-John's career up to that point, starting with singles from If Not for You.

MCA experimented with oversized packaging for the cassette edition of Olivia's Greatest Hits Vol. 2, released in a blister pack attached to a standard 12-by-12-inch record jacket. The packaging received a "mixed" response from retailers, and MCA vice president of sales John Burns indicated that the company was unlikely to use the format again.

== Critical reception ==
Professional ratings
Review scores
| Source | Rating |
|---|---|
| AllMusic | 4/5 stars |

AllMusic wrote that the album "remains the best choice for casual fans who only want the roller-rink hits", while Billboard praised the consistency of Newton-John's collaboration with John Farrar, stating that they "consistently make some of the best singles in the business". The magazine described the collection's songs as ranging from "silky ballads" such as "Magic" to "frenetic workouts" such as "You're the One That I Want", but criticized the omission of "Summer Nights" and "Deeper Than the Night".

== Commercial performance ==
The album peaked at No. 16 on the Billboard 200, but spent over 80 weeks on the chart and ultimately ranked as the No. 10 album of 1983. This was the longest chart run of Newton-John's career and her first non-soundtrack album to rank in the year-end Top 10. It was later certified double platinum by the RIAA in the United States. In the United Kingdom, it peaked at No. 8 and spent 38 weeks on the chart, becoming the singer's only non-soundtrack album to receive platinum certification there. In her native Australia, it reached No. 1, her third album to do so after the soundtracks to Grease and Xanadu. The album shipped 150,000 copies in Canada initially.

== Track listing ==
Olivia's Greatest Hits Vol. 2 North American track listing
| No. | Title | Writer(s) | Producer | Length |
|---|---|---|---|---|
| 1. | "Heart Attack" | Paul Bliss; Steve Kipner | John Farrar | 3:07 |
| 2. | "Magic" (from the Xanadu soundtrack, 1980) | Farrar | Farrar | 4:28 |
| 3. | "Physical" (from Physical, 1981) | Kipner; Terry Shaddick | Farrar | 3:43 |
| 4. | "Hopelessly Devoted to You" (from the Grease soundtrack, 1978) | Farrar | Farrar | 3:05 |
| 5. | "Make a Move on Me" (from Physical, 1981) | Farrar; Tom Snow | Farrar | 3:17 |
| 6. | "A Little More Love" (from Totally Hot, 1978) | Farrar | Farrar | 3:27 |
| 7. | "You're the One That I Want" (with John Travolta, from the Grease soundtrack, 1978) | Farrar | Farrar | 2:47 |
| 8. | "Tied Up" | Farrar; Lee Ritenour | Farrar | 4:27 |
| 9. | "Suddenly" (with Cliff Richard, from the Xanadu soundtrack, 1980) | Farrar | Farrar | 4:03 |
| 10. | "Xanadu" (with Electric Light Orchestra, from the Xanadu soundtrack, 1980) | Jeff Lynne | Lynne | 3:30 |
| Total length: | | | | 35:54 |

1982 international edition and 2023 deluxe edition re-release bonus tracks
| No. | Title | Writer(s) | Producer | Length |
|---|---|---|---|---|
| 1. | "Heart Attack" | Paul Bliss; Steve Kipner | John Farrar | 3:07 |
| 2. | "Magic" (from the Xanadu soundtrack, 1980) | Farrar | Farrar | 4:28 |
| 3. | "Physical" (from Physical, 1981) | Kipner; Terry Shaddick | Farrar | 3:43 |
| 4. | "Deeper Than the Night" (from Totally Hot, 1978) | Snow; Johnny Vastano | Farrar | 4:16 |
| 5. | "Hopelessly Devoted to You" (from the Grease soundtrack, 1978) | Farrar | Farrar | 3:05 |
| 6. | "Make a Move on Me" (from Physical, 1981) | Farrar; Tom Snow | Farrar | 3:17 |
| 7. | "Landslide" (from Physical, 1981) | Farrar | Farrar | 4:01 |
| 8. | "A Little More Love" (from Totally Hot, 1978) | Farrar | Farrar | 3:27 |
| 9. | "You're the One That I Want" (with John Travolta, from the Grease soundtrack 1978) | Farrar | Farrar | 2:47 |
| 10. | "Tied Up" | Farrar; Lee Ritenour | Farrar | 4:27 |
| 11. | "Suddenly" (with Cliff Richard, from the Xanadu soundtrack, 1980) | Farrar | Farrar | 4:03 |
| 12. | "Totally Hot" (from Totally Hot, 1978) | Farrar | Farrar | 3:11 |
| 13. | "The Promise (The Dolphin Song)" (from Physical, 1981) | Olivia Newton-John | Farrar | 4:28 |
| 14. | "Xanadu" (with Electric Light Orchestra, from the Xanadu soundtrack, 1980) | Jeff Lynne | Lynne | 3:30 |
| Total length: | | | | 51:50 |

1982 U.K./Europe version - Olivia's Greatest Hits
| No. | Title | Writer(s) | Producer | Length |
|---|---|---|---|---|
| 1. | "Physical" (from Physical, 1981) | Kipner; Terry Shaddick | Farrar | 3:43 |
| 2. | "Tied Up" | Farrar; Lee Ritenour | Farrar | 4:27 |
| 3. | "Heart Attack" | Paul Bliss; Steve Kipner | John Farrar | 3:07 |
| 4. | "Make a Move on Me" (from Physical, 1981) | Farrar; Tom Snow | Farrar | 3:17 |
| 5. | "You're the One That I Want" (with John Travolta, from the Grease soundtrack 1978) | Farrar | Farrar | 2:47 |
| 6. | "What Is Life" (from Olivia, 1972) | George Harrison | Farrar | 3:17 |
| 7. | "Xanadu" (with Electric Light Orchestra, from the Xanadu soundtrack, 1980) | Jeff Lynne | Lynne | 3:30 |
| 8. | "Summer Nights" (from the Grease soundtrack, 1978) | Jim Jacobs, Warren Casey | Louis St. Louis | 3:33 |
| 9. | "Landslide" (from Physical, 1981) | Farrar | Farrar | 4:01 |
| 10. | "Take Me Home, Country Roads" (from Music Makes My Day, 1973) | John Denver | Farrar | 3:15 |
| 11. | "A Little More Love" (from Totally Hot, 1978) | Farrar | Farrar | 3:27 |
| 12. | "Magic" (from the Xanadu soundtrack, 1980) | Farrar | Farrar | 4:28 |
| 13. | "Suddenly" (with Cliff Richard, from the Xanadu soundtrack 1980) | Farrar | Farrar | 4:03 |
| 14. | "Changes" (from Olivia, 1972) | Olivia Newton-John | Farrar | 3:17 |
| 15. | "Hopelessly Devoted to You" (from the Grease soundtrack, 1978) | Farrar | Farrar | 3:05 |
| 16. | "Sam" (from Don't Stop Believin', 1976) | Farrar | Farrar | 3:41 |
| 17. | "If Not for You" (from If Not for You, 1976) | Bob Dylan | Farrar | 2:51 |
| 18. | "Banks of the Ohio" (from If Not for You, 1976) | Traditional | Farrar | 3:13 |
| 19. | "Rosewater" (from Music Makes My Day, 1973) | Olivia Newton-John | Farrar | 3:52 |
| 20. | "I Honestly Love You" (from Long Live Love, 1974) | Jeff Barry, Peter Allen | Farrar | 3:52 |
| Total length: | | | | 59:30 |

== Charts ==
=== Weekly charts ===
Weekly chart performance for Olivia's Greatest Hits Vol. 2 / Vol. 3
| Chart (1982–1983) | Peak position |
|---|---|
| Australian Albums (Kent Music Report) | 1 |
| Canada Top Albums/CDs (RPM) | 6 |
| Japanese Albums (Oricon) | 12 |
| New Zealand Albums (RMNZ) | 3 |
| US Billboard 200 | 16 |
| US Cash Box Top Albums | 6 |

Weekly chart performance for Olivia's Greatest Hits
| Chart (1982–1983) | Peak position |
|---|---|
| Dutch Albums (Album Top 100) | 12 |
| French Albums (SNEP) | 20 |
| German Albums (Offizielle Top 100) | 33 |
| UK Albums (Official Charts) | 8 |

=== Year-end charts ===
1982 year-end chart performance for Olivia's Greatest Hits Vol. 2
| Chart (1982) | Position |
|---|---|
| Canada Top Albums/CDs (RPM) | 41 |
| New Zealand Albums (RMNZ) | 43 |

1983 year-end chart performance for Olivia's Greatest Hits Vol. 2
| Chart (1983) | Position |
|---|---|
| Australian Albums (Kent Music Report) | 13 |
| Canada Top Albums/CDs (RPM) | 66 |
| US Billboard 200 | 10 |

2023 weekly chart performance for Olivia Newton-John's Greatest Hits Vol. 2 (Deluxe Edition)
| Chart (2023) | Peak position |
|---|---|
| US Top Album Sales (Billboard) | 93 |
| Scottish Albums (Official Charts) | 66 |
| UK Album Sales Chart(OCC) | 61 |

== Certifications and sales ==
Certifications and sales for Olivia's Greatest Hits Vol. 2
| Region | Certification | Certified units/sales |
|---|---|---|
| Australia (ARIA) | Platinum | 50,000^{^} |
| Canada (Music Canada) | 5× Platinum | 500,000^{^} |
| Japan | — | 154,110 |
| New Zealand (RMNZ) | Platinum | 15,000^{^} |
| United Kingdom (BPI) | Platinum | 300,000^{^} |
| United States (RIAA) | 2× Platinum | 2,000,000^{^} |
^{^} Shipments figures based on certification alone.
