= It's Gonna Be Special =

Single by Patti Austin

from the album Patti Austin and Two of a Kind: Music from the Original Motion Picture Soundtrack
- B-side: "Solero"
- Released: 1983
- Recorded: 1983
- Genre: Pop
- Length: 4:14 (single/album version); 6:30 (Dance Remix)
- Label: Qwest
- Songwriter(s): Glen Ballard; Clif Magness
- Producer(s): Quincy Jones

Patti Austin singles chronology
"In My Life" (1983)	"It's Gonna Be Special" (1983)	"Rhythm of the Street" (1984)

Music video
- "It's Gonna Be Special" on YouTube

"It's Gonna Be Special" is a song by Patti Austin that was included on the soundtrack album to the 1983 film Two of a Kind and released as the first single from her self-titled 1984 album.

== Commercial performance ==
"It's Gonna Be Special" spent 13 weeks on Billboard magazine's Dance/Disco chart, where it got as high as number 5. It also reached number 15 on their R&B chart during its 14 weeks there and spent 4 weeks on the Billboard Hot 100, where it peaked at number 82.

== Critical reception ==
In their review of Patti Austin, the editors of Cashbox magazine described "It's Gonna Be Special" as one of three tracks on the album that "capture Austin's amazing vocal capabilities while really working out musically." The editors of Billboard magazine selected the song as one of the "strongest tracks" from Patti Austin. In their review of the single, they wrote, "[B]right, upbeat tracks plus a high-powered performance suggest pop crossover."

== Personnel ==
From the liner notes for Patti Austin, except as noted:

- Patti Austin – lead vocals, backing vocals
- Clif Magness – guitar, rhythm arrangement
- Paulinho da Costa – percussion
- John Van Tongeren – keyboards and synthesizer
- Jerry Hey – trumpet, horn arrangement
- Gary Grant – trumpet
- Larry Williams – alto saxophone
- Kim Hutchcroft – tenor saxophone
- Glen Ballard – rhythm arrangement
- Quincy Jones – producer
- John "Jellybean" Benitez – remixing (12-inch single)

== Charts ==
Weekly chart performance for "It's Gonna Be Special"
Chart (1984)	Peak position
US Billboard Hot 100	82
US Dance Club Songs (Billboard)	5
US Hot R&B/Hip-Hop Songs (Billboard)	15
