= Indigo: Women of Song =

Studio album by Olivia Newton-John
- Released: 17 October 2004
- Recorded: November 2003 – March 2004
- Studio: Indigo Ranch Studios (Malibu, California); Shire Studios (Bedford, New York); Right Track Recording (New York City, New York); Henson Recording Studios (Hollywood, California)
- Genre: Vocal
- Length: 43:01
- Label: Festival Mushroom
- Producer: Phil Ramone

Olivia Newton-John chronology
2 (2002)	Indigo: Women of Song (2004)	Gold (2005)

Indigo: Women of Song is the nineteenth studio album by British-Australian singer Olivia Newton-John. It was first released by Festival Mushroom Records on 17 October 2004 in Australia. An album of cover versions of songs previously recorded by female singers, it was entirely produced by Phil Ramone. Indigo: Women of Song peaked at number 15 on the Australian Albums Chart and was eventually certified Gold by the Australian Recording Industry Association (ARIA). In the United States, the album was issued under the title Portraits – A Tribute to Great Women of Song, featuring different artwork. The album was eventually released in Japan, 2006 under the Universal Music label.

== Critical reception ==
Professional ratings
Review scores
Source	Rating
AllMusic	2.5/5 stars

AllMusic editor Jon O'Brien rated the album two and a half stars out of five, writing that "Newton-John's light and airy vocals are the perfect foil for the swooning lounge-pop" of the Burt Bacharach/David, Stephen Sondheim and Astrud Gilberto renditions on Indigo, but "her clean-cut sweetly sung tones lack the emotion to pull off" the rest of the material".

== Track listing ==
All tracks produced by Phil Ramone.

Indigo: Women of Song track listing
No.	Title	Writer(s)	Length
1.	"How Insensitive"	Antônio Carlos Jobim; Norman Gimbel; Vinícius de Moraes	4:19
2.	"Love Me or Leave Me"	Walter Donaldson; Gus Kahn	3:26
3.	"Cry Me a River"	Arthur Hamilton	4:35
4.	"Anyone Who Had a Heart"	Burt Bacharach; Hal David	3:17
5.	"Where Have All the Flowers Gone?"	Pete Seeger	4:25
6.	"How Glad I Am"	Jimmy Williams; Larry Harrison	2:54
7.	"Lovin' You"	Minnie Riperton; Richard Rudolph	3:59
8.	"Rainy Days and Mondays"	Paul Williams; Roger Nichols	3:50
9.	"Send in the Clowns"	Stephen Sondheim	3:41
10.	"Summertime"	George Gershwin; Ira Gershwin; DuBose Heyward; Dorothy Heyward	4:31
11.	"Alfie"	Bacharach; David	4:04

== Personnel ==
Performers and musicians

- Elena Barere – concertmaster (2, 4, 5, 6, 10)
- Jill Dell'Abate – orchestral contractor (New York)
- Bruce Dukov – concertmaster (1, 3, 11)
- Lisa Fischer – backing vocals (4, 7)
- Julliann French – orchestral contractor (Los Angeles)
- Scott Kreitzer – tenor saxophone (1, 4, 10)
- Rob Mathes – acoustic piano (11)
- Hendrik Meurkens – harmonica (3, 8)
- Rob Mounsey – orchestral conductor (2, 4, 5, 6, 10)
- Olivia Newton-John – lead vocals
- Brian O'Connor – French horn (11)
- Dean Parks – guitar (1, 3–8, 10)
- Shawn Pelton – drums (1–8, 10)
- Philippe Saisse – keyboards (7, 9)
- Vaneese Thomas – backing vocals (4, 7)
- Randy Waldman – keyboards, programming, arrangements, orchestral conductor (1, 3, 11)

Technical

- Jon Berkowitz – assistant engineer
- Kevin Bosley – assistant engineer
- Jill Dell'Abate – production manager
- Andrew Felluss – assistant engineer
- Ted Jensen – mastering (at Sterling Sound (New York, NY)
- Chuck Johnson – assistant engineer
- Richard Kaplan – assistant engineer
- Brian Montgomery – assistant engineer
- Joel Moss – mixing (at Shire Studios), recording
- Phil Ramone – producer
- Chad Allen Smith – design and photograph
- Jay Spears – assistant engineer
- Ed Thacker – recording
- Mark Valentine – recording

== Charts ==
Chart performance for Indigo: Women of Song
Chart (2004–2005)	Peak position
Australian Albums (ARIA)	15
UK Albums (OCC)	27
Scottish Albums (OCC)	31

== Certifications ==
Certifications for Indigo: Women of Song
Region	Certification	Certified units/sales
Australia (ARIA)	Gold	35,000^{^}
^{^} Shipments figures based on certification alone.

== Release history ==
Release history and formats for Indigo: Women of Song
Region	Date	Format	Label	Ref(s)
United States	9 November 2004	CD; digital download	Green Gill	
