= Change (Vanessa Amorosi album) =

Studio album by Vanessa Amorosi
- Released: 18 November 2002
- Length: 43:27
- Label: CBK; Universal
- Producer: Christian Ballard; Anders Barrén; Axel Breitung; Charles Fisher; Andrew Murray; Richard Pleasance; Jani Schella; Fredrik Thomander; Anders Wikström

Vanessa Amorosi chronology
Turn to Me (2001)	Change (2002)	The Best of Vanessa Amorosi (2005)

Singles from Change
- 1. "One Thing Leads 2 Another" Released: 14 October 2002 (Germany); 2. "Spin (Everybody's Doin' It)" Released: 28 October 2002 (Australia); 3. "True to Yourself" Released: 24 February 2003 (Germany)

Change is the second studio album by Vanessa Amorosi, released in Germany in November 2002. It peaked at number 64 on the German Top 100. The album was due to be released in Australia, but it remains unreleased there.

== Track listing ==
Change track listing
No.	Title	Writer(s)	Producer(s)	Length
1.	"One Thing Leads 2 Another"	Amorosi; Mark Holden; Axel Breitung	Breitung	3:18
2.	"Turning Up the Heat"	Amorosi; Anders Wikström; Fredrik Thomander	Wikström; Thomander	3:09
3.	"Spin"	Jeanette Olsson; Jani Schella; Anders Barrén; Douglas Pashley	Schella; Barrén	3:02
4.	"Dream"	Amorosi; Holden; Klarmann/Weber	Breitung	3:45
5.	"Change"	Amorosi; Holden; Nathan Cavaleri	Breitung	3:22
6.	"Lifted Up"	Amorosi; Holden	Breitung	3:22
7.	"Back in Love"	Amorosi; Marcel Yammouni	Charles Fisher	3:44
8.	"Who's Lovin' You"	Amorosi; Holden; Shaun Imrei	Richard Pleasance	3:44
9.	"True to Yourself"	Jane Vaughan; Sylvia Bennett-Smith; Andrew Murray; Gary Barlow	Murray; Christian Ballard	3:41
10.	"Follow Me"	Amorosi; Wikström; Thomander	Wikström; Thomander	3:29
11.	"Bitter Twist"	Amorosi; Marcel Yammouni	Charles Fisher	3:45
12.	"Sometimes Happiness"	Amorosi; Holden	Breitung	4:57

== Charts ==
Weekly chart performance for Change
Chart (2002)	Peak position
German Albums (Offizielle Top 100)	64

== Release history ==
Release history for Change
Region	Date	Label	Catalogue
Germany	18 November 2002	Universal Music	066 893-2
