= Twist of Fate (Olivia Newton-John song) =

Single by Olivia Newton-John

from the album Two of a Kind
- B-side: "Jolene" (UK); "Take a Chance" (with John Travolta) (US)
- Released: 21 October 1983
- Recorded: 1983
- Genre: Pop; pop rock; synth pop; new wave
- Length: 3:44 (single/album version); 5:34 (extended version)
- Label: EMI (UK); MCA (US)
- Songwriters: Peter Beckett; Steve Kipner
- Producer: David Foster

Olivia Newton-John UK singles chronology
"Tied Up" (1983)	"Twist of Fate" (1983)	"Take a Chance" (1984)

Olivia Newton-John US singles chronology
"Tied Up" (1983)	"Twist of Fate" / "Take a Chance" (1983)	"Livin' in Desperate Times" (1984)

Music video
- "Twist of Fate" on YouTube

"Twist of Fate" is a song recorded by British-Australian singer Olivia Newton-John for the soundtrack to the 1983 film Two of a Kind. Written by Peter Beckett and Steve Kipner and produced by David Foster, the song was released as the first single from the album on 21 October 1983. It reached the top five on the pop charts in Australia, Canada and the US.

== Background and lyrics ==
In 1978 John Travolta and Olivia Newton-John starred in Grease, a big-screen adaptation of the 1972 Broadway musical of the same name. Its success elicited offers to reunite them in another film; Travolta read the screenplay for Two of a Kind and persuaded Newton-John to star in it with him. His character in the film is an unsuccessful inventor who has been unknowingly selected to determine the fate of humanity. After he attempts to rob a bank where the teller (Newton-John) gives him a bag full of deposit slips and keeps the money for herself, fate brings them together again in a fatal accident. They are brought back to life when the hands of time are turned back under the condition, unbeknownst to them, that the two make sacrifices for one another before a week has lapsed so that God does not destroy the human race. The song, which was written by Peter Beckett and Steve Kipner and produced by David Foster, alludes to the wrongdoings of the characters but mostly centers around the fact that they get a second chance at life.

== Commercial performance ==
"Twist of Fate" made its debut on the Billboard Hot 100 at number 49 in the issue of the magazine dated 5 November 1983 and peaked at number 5 the week ending 7 January 1984. The song charted for 18 weeks. It also reached number 4 in Australia, number 5 in Canada and South Africa, number 20 in Switzerland, number 22 in New Zealand, number 33 in Belgium, number 42 in the Netherlands and number 57 in the UK. A 12-inch single with an extended version of the song got as high as number 51 on Billboard's Dance Club Songs chart in the US.

A duet with Travolta from the film, "Take a Chance", was included as the B-side of the 7-inch single in the US, where it peaked at number 3 on Billboard's Adult Contemporary chart, as well as in Canada, where it hit number 1 on the same chart in RPM magazine.

== Critical reception ==
In their review of the single, the editors of Billboard magazine described it as "a strong dance-rocker that floats Newton-John's light voice over a booming, bass-heavy rhythm track." Cash Box wrote that the song "shows an urgent David Foster production full of throbbing bass lines and multi-layered keyboard parts." They noted of Newton-John that "her full-throttled vocal performance bodes extremely well for a successful new beginning." Robin Smith of Record Mirror, however, wrote, "Our Livvy's heart just isn't in this one."

== Music video ==
In the music video for "Twist of Fate", Newton-John sings on a black soundstage surrounded by three raised jury boxes filled with people mostly shown in shadows. Scenes from the movie either start or end as still frames that are presented to the singer and the jury as large photographs. Travolta enters as she finishes the song. The video was directed by Brian Grant.

"Twist of Fate" was listed on the reports that MTV provided to Billboard that indicated what videos were in rotation on the cable network and made its first appearance there in the 3 December 1983 issue, which indicated that it had been added to their playlist as of 21 November.

A collection of videos for Newton-John's songs from Two of a Kind was also titled Twist of Fate. The collection was nominated for Best Video, Short Form at the 27th Annual Grammy Awards but lost to David Bowie's Jazzin' for Blue Jean.

== Appearances in other media ==
In 2017, the song was featured in the second season of the Netflix series Stranger Things and included on the soundtrack album, Stranger Things: Music from the Netflix Original Series. The album was nominated for Best Compilation Soundtrack for Visual Media at the 61st Annual Grammy Awards.

== Track listing and formats ==
All tracks produced by David Foster except "Coolin' Down" and "Jolene", produced by John Farrar.

- Australian 7-inch single (Interfusion Records)
1. "Twist of Fate" (Beckett, Kipner) – 3:39
2. "Coolin' Down" (Farrar)– 3:57
- UK 7-inch single (EMI Records)
1. "Twist of Fate"
2. "Jolene" (Dolly Parton)
- US/Canadian 7-inch single (MCA Records)
1. "Twist of Fate" – 3:39
2. "Take a Chance" (with John Travolta) (Foster, Steve Lukather, Olivia Newton-John) – 4:05
- US 12-inch single – Promo Only (MCA Records)
1. "Twist of Fate (Extended Version)" – 5:18
2. "Twist of Fate" – 3:39

== Charts ==
=== Weekly charts ===
Chart performance for "Twist of Fate"
Chart (1983–1984)	Peak position
Australia (Kent Music Report)	4
Belgium (Ultratop 50 Flanders)	33
Canada (RPM)	5
Israel (Israeli Singles Chart)	13
Japan (Oricon)	73
Netherlands (Single Top 100)	42
New Zealand (Recorded Music NZ)	22
South Africa (Springbok)	5
Switzerland (Schweizer Hitparade)	20
UK Singles (Official Charts)	57
US Billboard Hot 100	5
US Cash Box Top 100	5
US Dance Club Songs (Billboard)	51
Quebec (ADISQ)	2

=== Year-end charts ===
Chart performance for "Twist of Fate"
Chart (1984)	Position
Australia (Kent Music Report)	46
Canada Top Singles (RPM)	48
US Billboard Hot 100	42
US Cash Box Top 100	55

== Certifications and sales ==
Region	Certification	Certified units/sales
Canada (Music Canada)	Gold	50,000^{^}
^{^} Shipments figures based on certification alone.

== Bibliography ==
- O'Neil, Thomas (1999), The Grammys, Perigree Books, ISBN 0-399-52477-0
