= 2 (Olivia Newton-John album) =

Studio album by Olivia Newton-John
- Released: 12 November 2002
- Recorded: April–August 2002
- Studio: Sing Sing South (Melbourne, Australia); Electric Mountain Studios and Milk Bar Studios (Sydney, Australia); Red Zone Studios (Burbank, California)
- Genre: Pop, country pop, adult contemporary
- Length: 47:05
- Label: Festival Mushroom Universal Music
- Producer: Charles Fisher; Richard Marx; Rick Nowels

Olivia Newton-John chronology
The Definitive Collection (2000)	2 (2002)	Indigo: Women of Song (2004)

2 (stylised as (2)) is the eighteenth studio album by British-Australian pop singer Olivia Newton-John, released on 12 November 2002 in Australia. A duets album, the majority of tracks are with Australian artists, along with two American performers (Richard Marx and Michael McDonald). The Peter Allen and Johnny O'Keefe duets are built around archive recordings, with new vocals added by Newton-John.

The album was planned to include the song "True to Yourself", a Vanessa Amorosi song re-recorded as a duet and intended as track two. However, the track was dropped at the last minute due to contractual disagreements between Amorosi's Transistor Music and Newton-John's Universal Music labels. Both women said they felt sad about the situation and clarified that there is no problem between them, but that it was simply a contractual matter.

== Release and promotion ==
The album was a great success in Australia, reaching the top 10 in the ARIA Charts, being certified Platinum. A TV special for the album promotion, A Night with Olivia, also aired in the country, featuring John Farnham and Tina Arena as special guests.

Newton-John's 2008 duets album, A Celebration in Song, contains two songs originally released on (2): "Never Far Away" and "Sunburned Country".

=== Tour ===
The Australian leg of Newton-John's Heartstrings World Tour also served in the promotion of album. These were the first solo concerts in Australia of Olivia since 1982 and were very well received by the public and critics. New Idea magazine published an article of "the comeback of queen" in 2002, highlighting the success of the album and tour, as well as its induction into the ARIA Hall of Fame.

== Track listing ==
No.	Title	Writer(s)	Producer(s)	Length
1.	"Sunburned Country" (with Keith Urban)	Newton-John, Urban	Charles Fisher	5:37
2.	"Lift Me Up" (with Darren Hayes)	Hayes, Rick Nowels	Fisher, Nowels	3:59
3.	"I'll Come Runnin'" (with Tina Arena)	Diane Warren	Fisher	4:26
4.	"Tenterfield Saddler" (with Peter Allen)	Allen	Fisher	4:07
5.	"I Will Be Right Here" (with David Campbell)	Warren	Fisher	4:26
6.	"I Love You Crazy" (with Human Nature)	Brooke McClymont, Robert Parde, Steve Werfel	Fisher	3:49
7.	"Bad About You" (with Billy Thorpe)	Don Cook, James House, Newton-John	Fisher	3:00
8.	"I'm Counting on You" (with Johnny O'Keefe)	Alicia Evelyn	Fisher	2:29
9.	"Never Far Away" (with Richard Marx)	Marx, Jamey Clewer	Fisher, Marx	4:45
10.	"Happy Day" (with Jimmy Little)	Nathan Cavaleri, Don Walker	Fisher	3:55
11.	"Act of Faith" (with Michael McDonald)	McDonald, Newton-John, Tommy Sims	Fisher	4:56

Hidden bonus track
No.	Title	Writer(s)	Producer(s)	Length
12.	"Physical" (samba version)	Steve Kipner, Terry Shaddick	Fisher	4:16

Japan edition bonus track
No.	Title	Writer(s)	Producer(s)	Length
13.	"Let It Be Me" (with Cliff Richard)	Gilbert Bécaud, Mann Curtis, Pierre Delanoë	Fisher	3:43

== Personnel ==
- Olivia Newton-John – lead vocals
- Steve Nathan – organ (1)
- Rick Nowels – keyboards (2)
- Andrew Bojanic – synthesizer (2, 10), guitars (2, 3, 4, 8), bass (2, 3, 4, 8), drum programming (2), keyboards (4, 8), backing vocals (5)
- Chong Lim – keyboards (3, 5)
- Peter Allen – acoustic piano (4), lead vocals (4)
- Warren "Pig" Morgan – keyboards (7)
- Richard Marx – keyboards (9), lead vocals (9)
- Mike Bukovik – guitars (1)
- Keith Urban – guitars (1), lead vocals (1)
- Stuart Fraser – guitars (5, 11)
- Tim Pierce – guitars (6, 7, 10)
- Billy Thorpe – guitars (7), lead vocals (7)
- Dai Pritchard – guitars (7)
- Alison Prestwood – bass (1)
- Joe Creighton – bass (5, 11)
- Mark O'Connor – bass (6, 10), keyboards (6, 10, 11)
- Dario Bortolin – bass (7)
- Chris McHugh – drums (1)
- Iki Levy – drum programming (3), drums (6, 10, 11)
- Bradley Polain – drums (4, 6)
- Angus Burchill – drums (5)
- Mark Kennedy – drums (7)
- Marlen Landin – backing vocals (1)
- Steve Real – backing vocals (1)
- Darren Hayes – lead vocals (2)
- Tina Arena – lead vocals (3)
- Liz Hooper – backing vocals (3, 5)
- David Campbell – lead vocals (5)
- Human Nature – lead and backing vocals (6)
- Johnny O'Keefe – lead vocals (8)
- Jimmy Little – lead vocals (10)
- Michael McDonald – lead vocals (11)

=== Production ===
- Producers – Charles Fisher (tracks 1–11); Rick Nowels (track 2); Richard Marx (track 9); Andy Timmons (track 12)
- Additional production on tracks 4 and 8 – Wizards of Oz (Dale Barlow, Tony Buck, Paul Grabosky and Lloyd Swanton)
- Executive producer – Olivia Newton-John
- Engineers – Justin Niebank (track 1); Adam Rhodes (tracks 2, 3, 5, 6, 10 and 11); Tony Wall (tracks 2, 3, 5, 6, 7)
- Assistant engineers – Todd Gunnerson (track 1); Greg Clarke (tracks 2 and 7); Jimi Maroudas (tracks 2, 3, 5, 6, 10 and 11); Paul Rodger (tracks 3, 5 and 6)
- Drum recording on track 4 – Val Garay
- Mixed by Don Smith
- Mix assistants – Joe Brown and Ok Hee Kim
- Mastered by Stephen Marcussen at Marcussen Mastering (Hollywood, CA)
- Photography – Peter Carrette and Michelle Day

== Charts and certifications ==
=== Weekly charts ===
Chart (2002)	Peak position
Australian Albums (ARIA)	5

=== Year-end charts ===
Chart (2002)	Position
Australian Albums (ARIA)	87
Australian Artist Albums (ARIA)	20

=== Certifications ===
Region	Certification	Certified units/sales
Australia (ARIA)	Platinum	70,000^{^}
^{^} Shipments figures based on certification alone.
