= Tied Up =

Single by Olivia Newton-John

from the album Olivia's Greatest Hits Vol. 2
- B-side: "Silvery Rain"
- Released: January 1983
- Recorded: 1982
- Genre: Pop rock; synthpop
- Length: 4:27
- Label: MCA
- Songwriters: John Farrar, Lee Ritenour
- Producer: John Farrar

Olivia Newton-John singles chronology
"Heart Attack" (1982)	"Tied Up" (1983)	"Twist of Fate" (1983)

"Tied Up" is a song recorded by English-born Australian singer Olivia Newton-John for her second greatest hits album Olivia's Greatest Hits Vol. 2 (1982). Written by John Farrar and Lee Ritenour, and produced by the former, the song was the second single released from the album, following "Heart Attack". "Tied Up" reached number 38 on the US Billboard Hot 100.

The song features Tom Scott on horns, who was the opening act for Newton-John's 1982 Physical Tour.

Billboard called it a "heavily textured production that's strong on bass drums and echoey vocal tracks", while Cash Box praised its "melodic twists and turns" and described the arrangement as building until "the simmer boils over".

Ritenour also recorded the song for his 1982 album Rit 2, with Eric Tagg performing vocals.

== Charts ==
Chart performance for "Tied Up"
Chart (1983)	Peak position
Australia (Kent Music Report)	54
Canada Top Singles (RPM)	43
US Billboard Hot 100	38
US Cash Box Top Singles	42
