= Heart Attack (Olivia Newton-John song) =

Single by Olivia Newton-John

from the album Olivia's Greatest Hits Vol. 2
- B-side: "Stranger's Touch"
- Released: August 1982
- Recorded: 1982
- Genre: Synthpop
- Length: 3:08
- Label: MCA
- Songwriters: Paul Bliss; Steve Kipner
- Producer: John Farrar

Olivia Newton-John singles chronology
"Landslide" (1982)	"Heart Attack" (1982)	"Tied Up" (1983)

"Heart Attack" is a song recorded by English-born Australian singer Olivia Newton-John for her second greatest hits album Olivia's Greatest Hits Vol. 2 (1982). Written by Paul Bliss and Steve Kipner, and produced by John Farrar, the song was the first single released from the album and was nominated for a Grammy Award for Best Female Pop Vocal Performance in 1983.

Backing Newton-John on the song were Bliss and Kipner on synthesizers, Carlos Vega on drums, Tom Scott on saxophone, and Farrar on guitars, bass guitar and backing vocals. Cash Box later referred to "Heart Attack" when reviewing "Tied Up", describing the latter as "not as exclamatory" as its predecessor.

== Charts ==
=== Weekly charts ===
Chart (1982–1983)	Peak position
Australia (Kent Music Report)	22
Austria (Ö3 Austria Top 40)	7
Belgium (Ultratop 50 Flanders)	34
Canada Top Singles (RPM)	2
Germany (GfK)	51
Ireland (IRMA)	30
Israel (Israeli Singles Chart)	15
Luxembourg (Radio Luxembourg)	30
New Zealand (Recorded Music NZ)	11
Norway (VG-lista)	5
South Africa (Springbok Radio)	4
UK Singles (Official Charts)	46
US Billboard Hot 100	3
US Cash Box	2
Quebec (ADISQ)	1

=== Year-end charts ===
Chart (1982)	Rank
Canada Top Singles (RPM)	24
South Africa (Springbok Radio)	18
US Cash Box	30

== Certifications and sales ==
Region	Certification	Certified units/sales
Canada (Music Canada)	Gold	50,000^{^}
^{^} Shipments figures based on certification alone.
