= Jazzin' for Blue Jean =

- North American VHS Video Cover
- Directed by: Julien Temple
- Screenplay by: Terry Johnson
- Story by: David Bowie
- Produced by: Paul Spencer
- Starring: David Bowie; Louise Scott
- Music by: David Bowie
- Production company: Nitrate Film Production Limited (Nitrate Films)
- Distributed by: Sony Home Video, EMI/Picture Music International, Pioneer Artists
- Release date: 1984
- Running time: 21 minutes
- Country: United Kingdom
- Language: English

Jazzin' for Blue Jean is a 21-minute short film featuring David Bowie and directed by Julien Temple. It was created to promote Bowie's single "Blue Jean" in 1984 and released as a video single.

The film won the 1985 Grammy Award for "Best Video, Short Form" (later renamed "Best Music Video"), which proved to be Bowie's only competitive Grammy Award during his lifetime.

== Background ==
Jazzin' for Blue Jean was shot in August 1984 and features Bowie in dual roles: as Vic, a man with his eye on a girl and as Screaming Lord Byron, a flamboyant rock star whose forthcoming gig provides the man with a date. Bowie performs "Blue Jean" as Byron towards the end of the film and a shorter music video for "Blue Jean" was shot a few days later. Jazzin' for Blue Jean led Bowie and Temple to work together for the movie Absolute Beginners (1986).

== Plot ==
The film depicts the adventures of the socially incompetent Vic (played by Bowie) as he tries to win the affections of a beautiful girl by claiming to personally know her favourite rock star, Screaming Lord Byron (also played by Bowie). Rightfully disbelieving him, she challenges Vic to introduce her to him. They make a date for a Screaming Lord Byron show, where Vic attempts to sneak backstage to convince a cowering, paranoid Mr. Screaming to come say hello to him and the girl after the show.

Screaming does come to Vic's table after the show and says hello to him and the girl, but the girl and Screaming Lord Byron have already met (in Peru), and she leaves with the rock star instead of Vic. As they drive off, Bowie breaks the fourth wall and asks the director why the story changed from his concept.

== Track listing ==
- "Don't Look Down" (from Tonight) [soundtrack only]
- "Warszawa" (from Low) [soundtrack only]
- "Blue Jean" (from Tonight) [music video]

== Cast and crew ==
The main cast and crew of the film:

=== Cast ===
- Screaming Lord Byron / Vic - David Bowie, with Screaming Lord Byron being a dual-allusion and parody of Lord Byron and Screaming Lord Sutch.
- "The Dream" - Louise Scott
- Screaming's Band - Paul Ridgeley, Richard Fairbrass, Daryl Humpries
- Bowie's stand-in - Ian Ellis

=== Crew ===
- Director - Julien Temple
- Conceived by - David Bowie
- Screenplay - Terry Johnson
- Choreographer - David Toguri
- Producer Paul Spencer

== Releases ==
The film was released on home video on VHS and Betamax formats by Sony Home Video in North America, EMI/Picture Music International in the UK, and on Laserdisc by Pioneer Artists in Japan (12" and 8", with analog stereo sound) and North America (12", digital and analog sound). The home video version was first converted to PAL for the UK, with the speed increased from 24 frames per second to 25fps, giving it a run time of 20 minutes. The NTSC (North America, Japan) version, converted from PAL, maintains the 20 minute run time.

The video later appears as an easter egg hidden on the Best of Bowie DVDs. It is slightly modified: in the club where the girl is watching a Screaming Lord Byron video, the screen originally showed footage of the very same concert she and Vic would later attend. On the DVD version, a different promotional video for the song is overlaid on the screen – this is also the trigger for another easter egg, which is itself that alternate video.

The portion of the movie where Screaming Lord Byron performs the song "Blue Jean" in front of the crowd was used as the standard-length music video and clocks in at just over three minutes. This short music video is a straight edit out of Jazzin' For Blue Jean and later appeared on 1993's David Bowie - The Video Collection.
