= Hopelessly Devoted: The Hits =

Greatest hits album by Olivia Newton-John
- Released: 8 June 2018
- Recorded: 1971–2015
- Length: 70:43
- Label: Sony Music Australia

Olivia Newton-John chronology
Friends for Christmas (2016)	Hopelessly Devoted: The Hits (2018)	Just the Two of Us: The Duets Collection (Vol. 1) (2023)

Hopelessly Devoted: The Hits is an Australian-only greatest hits album by English-Australian singer Olivia Newton-John, released on 8 June 2018 by Sony Music Australia, following the premiere of the Australian miniseries based on her life, Olivia Newton-John: Hopelessly Devoted to You, starring Delta Goodrem. The album debuted at number 14 on the ARIA Charts.

The album re-entered the charts and peaked at number 5 in August 2022, following Newton-John’s death.

== Track listing ==
Hopelessly Devoted: The Hits track listing
No.	Title	Writer(s)	Producer(s)	Length
1.	"Physical from Physical"	Kipner; Terry Shaddick	Farrar	3:40
2.	"Xanadu from Two Strong Hearts Live" (live; recorded in 2015)	Jeff Lynne	Farrar; Lynne	3:25
3.	"Let Me Be There from Music Makes My Day"	Rostill	Welch; Farrar	2:56
4.	"Have You Never Been Mellow from Have You Never Been Mellow"	Farrar	Farrar	3:29
5.	"A Little More Love from Totally Hot"	Farrar	Farrar	3:25
6.	"Summer Nights from Two Strong Hearts Live" (live; recorded in 2015)	Jim Jacobs; Warren Casey	Farrar; Michael Gibson; Louis St. Louis	4:57
7.	"Magic from Two Strong Hearts Live" (live; recorded in 2015)	Farrar	Farrar	4:34
8.	"You're the One That I Want from Two Strong Hearts Live" (live; recorded in 2015)	Farrar	Farrar	3:44
9.	"If Not for You from If Not for You"	Bob Dylan	Welch; Farrar	2:50
10.	"Banks of the Ohio from If Not for You"	Welch; Farrar	Welch; Farrar	3:14
11.	"I Honestly Love You from Long Live Love"	Peter Allen; Jeff Barry	Farrar	3:37
12.	"Please Mr. Please from Have You Never Been Mellow"	Bruce Welch; John Rostill	Farrar	3:21
13.	"Hopelessly Devoted to You from Two Strong Hearts Live" (live; recorded in 2015)	Farrar	Farrar	2:58
14.	"If You Love Me (Let Me Know) from If You Love Me, Let Me Know"	Rostill	Farrar	3:11
15.	"Sam from Don't Stop Believin'"	Farrar; Hank Marvin; Don Black	Farrar	3:40
16.	"Something Better to Do from Clearly Love"	Farrar	Farrar	3:14
17.	"Heart Attack from Physical 2021 deluxe edition"	Kipner; Paul Bliss	Farrar	3:05
18.	"Make a Move on Me from Physical"	Farrar; Snow	Farrar	3:14
19.	"Tied Up from Physical 2021 deluxe edition"	Farrar; Lee Ritenour	Farrar	4:26
20.	"Making a Good Thing Better from Making a Good Thing Better"	Pete Wingfield	Farrar	3:43
Total length:				70:43

== Charts ==
Weekly chart performance for Hopelessly Devoted: The Hits
Chart (2018–2022)	Peak position
Australian Albums (ARIA)	5
New Zealand Albums (RMNZ)	40
