= List of awards and honours received by Olivia Newton-John =

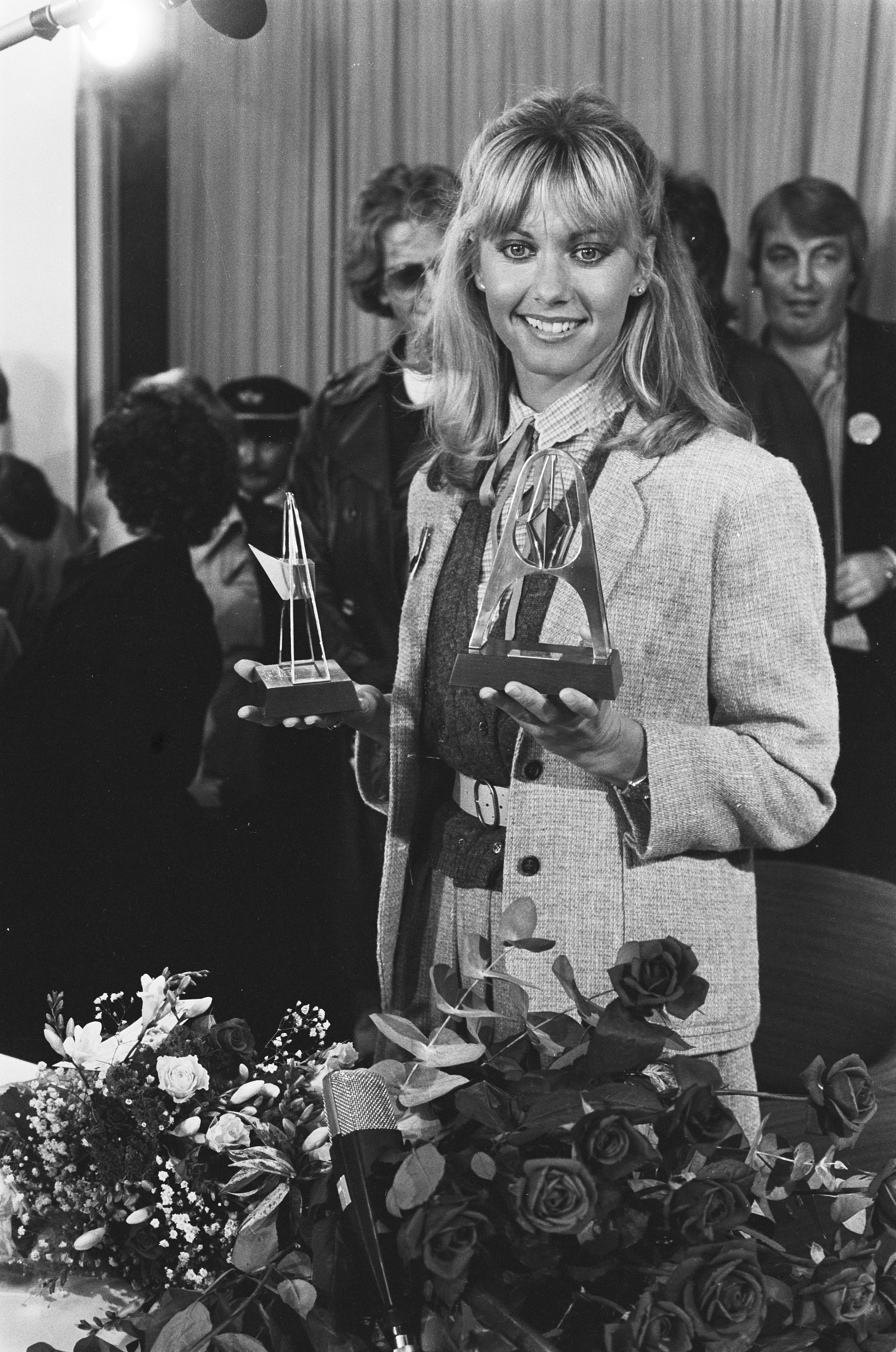
Olivia Newton-John in 1978

Olivia Newton-John was an English and Australian singer and actress. She had been active since 1963, when she was 15, up until her death in 2022. Newton-John had been honored with numerous accolades throughout her career.

== Honours ==
1979

- Officer of the Order of the British Empire (OBE) in the Civil Division by Queen Elizabeth II in the 1979 New Years Honours List.

1981

- Star on the Hollywood Walk of Fame at 6925 Hollywood Boulevard in the Recording Category on 5 August 1981.

1990

- Goodwill Ambassador to the United Nations Environment Programme

1998

- Cadillac Concept to the world Humanitarian Award for breast cancer research

1999

- Red Cross – Humanitarian Award for breast cancer and environmental charity work
- Women's Guild of Cedar-Sinai Hospital – "Woman of the 21st Century" Award for breast cancer and environmental charity work

2000

- Environmental Media Association – "Ermenegildo Zegna International Environmental Award" for increasing public awareness of environmental problems
- Rainforest Alliance – Green Globe Arts and Nature Award for her contribution to the preservation of rainforests

2002

- Australian Recording Industry Association – Hall of Fame

2006

- Australia Day at Penfolds Black Tie Gala – Lifetime Achievement Award
- Decatur Memorial Hospital (Illinois) – Humanitarian Award for her breast cancer awareness work from the
- Officer of the Order of Australia (AO) for "service to the entertainment industry as a singer and actor, and to the community through organisations supporting breast cancer treatment, education, training and research, and the environment"

2007

- American Australian Association Black Tie Gala – Lifetime Achievement Award
- Kimmel Center (Philadelphia, PA) – Valor Award for raising funds for cancer research

2008

- Project Angel Food – Marianne Williamson Founder's Award for her commitment to breast cancer awareness

2012

- National Trust of Australia (NSW) - named a National Living Treasure of Australia

2015

- Music Victoria Awards of 2015 - Hall of Fame

2018

- Honorary degree of Doctor of Letters (D.Litt) from La Trobe University in Melbourne on 14 May 2018. She also delivered the Commencement Address.

2019

- Companion of the Order of Australia (AC)
- Dame Commander of the Order of the British Empire (DBE) in the 2020 New Years Honours List.

2021

- Japan's Order of the Rising Sun, Gold Rays with Rosette
- Australian Women in Music Awards (Honour Roll)

2023

- Inducted posthumously into the Women Songwriters Hall of Fame.

== Awards ==
Academy of Country Music (ACM) Awards

Win:

- 1973 – Most Promising Female Vocalist

Nomination:

- 1974 – Top Female Vocalist

AGVA

- 1974 – Rising Star of the Year

American Music Awards

Wins:

- 1975 – Favorite Album – Pop/Rock: Have You Never Been Mellow
- 1975 – Favorite Female Artist – Country
- 1975 – Favorite Female Artist – Pop/Rock
- 1976 – Favorite Female Artist – Pop/Rock
- 1978 – Favorite Album – Pop/Rock: "Grease"
- 1982 – Favorite Female Artist – Pop/Rock

Nominations:

- 1975 – Favorite Album – Country: "Have You Never Been Mellow"
- 1979 – Favorite Female Artist – Pop/Rock
- 1980 – Favorite Female Artist – Pop/Rock

Australian Recording Industry Association (ARIA) Awards

Win:

- 1999 – ARIA Award for Highest Selling Album: Highlights from The Main Event

Nomination:

- 1999 – Best Adult Contemporary Album: "Highlights From The Main Event"
- 2015 - Best Adult Contemporary Album: "Two Strong Hearts Live"

Billboard Awards

- 1974 – Top Pop Singles Artist (Female)
- 1975 – Top Pop Albums Artist (Female)
- 1976 – Top Adult Contemporary Artist
- 1979 – Top Soundtrack: "Grease"
- 1982 – Top Pop Single: "Physical"
- 1982 – Top Pop Singles Artist
- 1982 – Top Pop Singles Artist (Female)
- 1997 – Top Pop Catalog Album: "Grease"
- 1998 – Top Pop Catalog Album: "Grease"

British Country Music Association Award (BCMA)

- 1974 – Female Vocalist of the Year

CableAce Awards

Nominations:

- 1983 - Actress in a Variety Program (Olivia in Concert)
- 1989 - Performance in a Music Special (Olivia Down Under)

Cashbox Awards

- 1974 – No.1 New Female Vocalist, Singles
- 1975 – No.1 Female Vocalist, Singles
- 1975 – No.1 Female Vocalist, Albums

Country Music Association (CMA) Awards

Win:

- 1974 – Female Vocalist of the Year

Nominations:

- 1974 – Album of the Year – If You Love Me Let Me Know
- 1974 – Entertainer of the Year
- 1974 – Single of the Year – "If You Love Me (Let Me Know)"

Daytime Emmy Awards

- 1999 – Outstanding Original Song – "Love Is A Gift"

Golden Globe Awards

Nominations:

- 1978 - Best Performance by an Actress in a Motion Picture Comedy or Musical - "Grease"

Juno Awards

Win:

- 1979 – Best Selling International Single - "You're the One That I Want"

Nominations:

- 1983 - International Album of the Year - "Physical"
- 1983 - International Single of the Year - "Physical"

Mo Awards

- 1998 - Australian Performer of the Year

Grammy Awards

Wins:

- 1973 – Best Female Country Vocal Performance: "Let Me Be There"
- 1974 – Record of the Year: "I Honestly Love You"
- 1974 – Best Female Pop Vocal Performance: "I Honestly Love You"
- 1982 – Video of the Year: Olivia Physical

Nominations:

- 1975 – Best Female Pop Vocal Performance: "Have You Never Been Mellow"
- 1978 – Album of the Year: Grease
- 1978 – Best Female Pop Vocal Performance: "Hopelessly Devoted to You"
- 1980 – Best Female Pop Vocal Performance: "Magic"
- 1981 – Best Female Pop Vocal Performance: "Physical"
- 1982 – Best Female Pop Vocal Performance: "Heart Attack"
- 1983 – Best Long Form Music Video: Olivia in Concert
- 1984 – Best Short Form Music Video: "Twist of Fate"

Inside Film Awards

- Best Music Video 'Magic 2011'

King of Pop Awards

- 1976 – Best Australian International Performer

National Association of Retail Merchandisers (NARM)

- Best Selling Album by a Female Country Artist: "If You Love Me, Let Me Know"
- Best Selling Album by a Female: "If You Love Me, Let Me Know"

People's Choice Awards (U.S.A.)

- 1975 – Favorite Female Musical Performer (tied with Barbra Streisand)
- 1977 – Favorite Female Musical Performer
- 1979 – Favorite Female Musical Performer
- 1979 – Favorite Motion Picture Actress

People's Choice Awards (Australia)

- 1998 – Favourite Female Singer (nominated)
- 1999 – Favourite Female Singer (nominated)

Record World

- 1974 – Top Most Promising Country Albums Artist (Female)
- 1974 – Top Most Promising Country Singles Artist (Female)
- 1974 – Top Pop Female Vocalist (Albums)
- 1974 – Top Pop Female Vocalist (Singles)
- 1975 – Top Country Female Vocalist (Albums)
- 1975 – Top Pop Female Vocalist (Albums)
- 1975 – Top Pop Female Vocalist (Singles)
- 1976 – Top Country Female Vocalist (Albums)
- 1976 – Top Pop Female Vocalist (Albums)
- 1978 – Top New Pop Duo (Singles) with John Travolta
