= Brinley Newton-John =

Professor of German literature

Brinley "Brin" Newton-John
- Born: Brinley Newton John; 5 March 1914; Cardiff, Wales
- Died: 3 July 1992 (aged 78); Manly, New South Wales
- Citizenship: United Kingdom; Australia
- Education: Cambridge University (BA 1935, MA 1939)
- Years active: 1936–1992
- Employer: MI5
- Children: 5, including Olivia

Brinley "Brin" Newton-John (5 March 1914 – 3 July 1992) was a Welsh–Australian university administrator, professor of German literature, intelligence officer, and Wing commander during the Second World War. Newton-John took part in the top-secret project founded to decipher the German Enigma machine and arrested Rudolf Hess, who had fled from Germany. He was the father of singer Olivia Newton-John.

Newton-John was widely popular as a professor, being respected and beloved by his students. His charisma earned him a fellowship with the Royal Society of Arts in 1972.

== Early life and education ==
Brinley Newton-John was born on 5 March 1914 in Cardiff, Wales, to a teacher, Oliver John, and his wife Daisy (née Newton). Educated at the Canton Municipal Secondary School (now Cantonian High School), Newton-John earned a scholarship to the Gonville and Caius College at Cambridge. He went on to earn a Double first in German and in French, getting his bachelor's degree in 1935 and his master's degree in 1939.

At a young age, Newton-John had an interest in music, learning to play the violin. His mother had been a singer in the Royal Welsh Ladies Choir and he had even considered a career in music as a professional singer. His daughter Olivia wrote that Newton-John had a "beautiful bass-baritone singing voice".

== Career ==
Newton-John initially served as an administrator at Christ's Hospital from 1936 to 1938, and at Stowe School from 1938 until 1940. He was commissioned in the British Royal Air Force (RAF) during World War II and, being a fluent German speaker, was drafted into the intelligence department, becoming an MI5 officer. As part of that role, he interrogated German prisoners of war and was embedded among German POWs to gather intelligence about the anticipated German invasion of England. Notably, Newton-John arrested Hitler's deputy, Rudolf Hess, who had landed in Scotland. He also participated in the highly classified project at Bletchley Park, aimed at breaking the code of the German Enigma machine. On 5 September 1945, he was promoted to war substantive flight lieutenant.

After his demobilisation at the end of the war, he returned to teaching, as headmaster of the Cambridgeshire High School for Boys. In 1954, he moved to Australia with his family to become the master of Ormond College at the University of Melbourne. At Ormond, he oversaw the construction of a number of new buildings.

Following a scandalous divorce, he became associate professor of German and head of the department of arts at the newly established Newcastle University College, which was then part of the University of New South Wales. He served a number of roles before eventually becoming deputy vice-chancellor of the college until his retirement in 1974. Upon his early retirement, the university gave Newton-John the title of professor emeritus and named an award for creativity and innovation in his honour.

Described as a "pioneer of television in Australia", Newton-John was a host on the programme Any Questions in 1958 and the presenter of Forum for a Newcastle TV station, NBN 3, in 1962. He appeared on an episode of The Valleys People (a chat show featuring residents of the Hunter Valley) in 1980. After his retirement, Newton-John began working as a radio and television presenter; after moving to the Manly neighbourhood of Sydney in 1981, he served as a regular presenter on the classical music radio station 2 MBS–FM and was a member of its board of directors.

== Personal life ==
On 5 April 1937, he married Irene Helene Käthe Hedwig Born (Irene Helene), daughter of the physicist Max Born, at Kensington, London. The two had three children, including Olivia. The two divorced in 1958. On 28 June 1963, he married Valerie Ter Wee (née Cunningham), a bookshop manager and pianist, who later worked as a clinical psychologist, with whom he had two children. Newton-John divorced his second wife and married journalist Gay Mary Jean Holley (née McOmish) on 21 August 1983.

On 3 July 1992, Newton-John died at Manly of liver cancer, and was cremated.
