= Stronger Than Before =

Studio album by Olivia Newton-John
- Released: 29 August 2005
- Recorded: February–June 2005
- Studio: The Barn (Tarzana, California); Westlake (Los Angeles, California); Bingham Bend (Leiper's Fork, Tennessee); Revolution (Sydney, Australia); River Studios (Melbourne, Australia); Allan Eaton (Melbourne, Australia); Metropolis Audio (South Melbourne, Australia); Definitive Sound (Ontario, Canada); Maison de Musique (Toronto, Canada)
- Genre: New-age
- Label: ONJ
- Producer: Kim Bullard; Chong Lim; Amy Sky

Olivia Newton-John chronology
Gold (2005)	Stronger Than Before (2005)	Grace and Gratitude (2006)

Stronger Than Before is the twentieth studio album by British-Australian singer Olivia Newton-John. It was first released by ONJ Productions and Hallmark on 29 August 2005 in the United States, where physical copies of the album were sold exclusively in Hallmark's Gold Crown Stores until 31 October 2005. This was followed by a digital and international release through ONJ and Warner Music in March 2006. An album of inspiration and encouragement to women who have dealt with cancer, Newton-John worked with Kim Bullard, Chong Lim, and Amy Sky on the ten-song collection.

Stronger Than Before is an album of inspiration and encouragement to women who have dealt with cancer (Newton-John herself died of breast cancer). The track "Phenomenal Woman" is based on Maya Angelou's 1978 poem and features vocal cameos from Patti LaBelle, Diahann Carroll, Beth Nielsen Chapman, Delta Goodrem, Amy Holland and Mindy Smith. The album also includes a new recording of her 1976 hit "Don't Stop Believin". The track "Can I Trust Your Arms" was composed by her daughter Chloe Rose Lattanzi as a gift for her mother. Olivia had already composed "That's All I Know for Sure" for Chloe.

== Critical reception ==
Professional ratings
Review scores
Source	Rating
AllMusic	2/5 stars

In their review, Billboard praised the album, noting that "the timeless Olivia Newton-John indulges her many followers with a second album in as many years, following 2004's import Indigo, in which she reinterpreted songs by 11 powerful female singers. Stronger Than Before also has a specific aim: presenting songs of inspiration, courage and hope during National Breast Cancer Awareness Month. It is tough picking premier tracks, because they all offer a hand to those seeking strength, whether through the fragile "Under the Skin" or the empowering "Pass It On." Newton-John, a 13 -year breast cancer survivor, gives her all to this lovely project - but then that's why she's been loved for 35 years."

AllMusic editor Peter Fawthrop rated the album two stars out of five. He felt that "those who relish the profundity of gift card messages may find it deeply inspiring. Everyone else could scratch off the words to some of the songs and get a kindergartner to come up with something more meaningful."

== Track listing ==
Stronger Than Before track listing
No.	Title	Writer(s)	Producer(s)	Length
1.	"Stronger Than Before"	Newton-John; Annie Roboff; Beth Nielsen Chapman	Chong Lim	3:37
2.	"When You Believe"	Jim Marr; Wendy Page	Lim	4:00
3.	"Phenomenal Woman"	Maya Angelou; Amy Sky; David Pickell	Sky; Kim Bullard	5:01
4.	"Under the Skin"	Newton-John; Sky	Sky	3:18
5.	"Pass It On"	Randy Goodrum; Martin Sutton	Lim	4:35
6.	"That's All I Know for Sure"	Newton-John; Victoria Shaw	Lim	2:53
7.	"When I Needed You"	Ben Thomas	Lim	4:59
8.	"Can I Trust Your Arms"	Newton-John; Chloe Lattanzi	Lim	3:18
9.	"Don't Stop Believin' (2005 Version)"	John Farrar	Lim	4:12
10.	"Serenity"	Sky; Stephan Moccio	Sky	4:02

== Personnel ==
Performers and musicians

- Olivia Newton-John – lead vocals, backing vocals (1, 3, 5, 9)
- Chong Lim – keyboards (1, 2, 5–9), acoustic piano (1, 2, 5–9)
- Kim Bullard – keyboards (3)
- Chris Anderson – programming (4)
- Rob Wells – programming (4), string programming (4)
- Stephan Moccio – acoustic piano (10), keyboards (10), programming (10)
- Stuart Fraser – guitars (1, 2, 5–9)
- Brett Garsed – guitars (1, 2, 5–9)
- Tim Pierce – guitars (3)
- Greg Johnston – guitars (4)
- Joe Creighton – bass (1, 2, 5–8)
- Danny Dunlop – bass (3)
- Ben Robertson – acoustic bass (9)
- Angus Burchall – drums (1, 2, 5–9)
- Vinnie Colaiuta – drums (3)
- Kevin Fox – cello (10)
- Rod Davies – backing vocals (1, 5, 9)
- Lisa Edwards – backing vocals (1, 5)
- Lindsay Field – backing vocals (1, 5)
- Diahann Carroll – vocals (3)
- Beth Nielsen Chapman – vocals (3)
- Delta Goodrem – vocals (3)
- Amy Holland – vocals (3)
- Patti LaBelle – vocals (3)
- Mindy Smith – vocals (3)
- Amy Sky – backing vocals (3, 4), acoustic piano (4), string programming (4)

Strings (tracks 1, 2 and 5–9)

- Chong Lim – string arrangements and conductor
- Sharon Draper and Blair Harris – cello
- Helen Ireland and Airlie Smart – viola
- Imelda Baligod, Jessica Bell, Georgina Cameron, Alyssa Conrau, Sally Cooper and Holly Smart – violin

Technical

- Producers – Chong Lim (tracks 1, 2 and 5–9); Amy Sky (tracks 3, 4 and 10); Kim Bullard (track 10)
- Executive producers – Teri Brown, Mark Hartley and Ann Herrick
- Engineers – Doug Brady, Haydn Buxton, Robin Gray and Forrester Savell (tracks 1, 2 and 5–9); Kim Bullard, Shannon Forrest and Vince Pizzinga (track 3); Chris Anderson and Greg Crichtley (track 4); Azra Hussein and Stephan Moccio (track 10)
- Assistant engineer (tracks 1, 2 and 5–9) – Mick Coleman
- Recorded at The Barn (Tarzana, California); Westlake Studios (Los Angeles, California); Bingham Bend Studio (Nashville, TN); Revolution Studios (Sydney, Australia); River Studios and Allan Eaton Studios (Melbourne, Australia); Metropolis Audio (South Melbourne, Australia); Definitive Sound (Ontario, Canada); Maison de Musique (Toronto, Canada)
- Mixing – Ed Cherney (tracks 1, 2 and 5–9); Kim Bullard (tracks 3, 4 and 10)
- Mixed at The Barn
- Editing on track 10 by Azra Hussein and Stephan Moccio at Maison de Musique
- Mastered by Doug Sax at The Mastering Lab (Ojai, California)
- Photography – Pamela Springsteen

== Charts ==
Chart performance for Stronger Than Before
Chart (2005–2006)	Peak position
Australian Albums (ARIA)	39

== Release history ==
Release history and formats for Stronger Than Before
Region	Date	Format	Label	Ref(s)
United States	29 August 2005	CD	ONJ; Hallmark	
Australia	5 March 2006	CD; digital download	ONJ; Warner	
