= Liv On =

Studio album by Amy Sky, Olivia Newton-John and Beth Nielsen Chapman
- Released: 7 October 2016
- Genre: Adult contemporary
- Label: UMG
- Producers: Olivia Newton-John, Beth Nielsen Chapman and Amy Sky

Olivia Newton-John chronology
Two Strong Hearts Live (2015)	Liv On (2016)	Friends for Christmas (2016)

Beth Nielsen Chapman chronology
The Mighty Sky (2012)	Liv On (2016)

Liv On is a collaborative album created by Amy Sky, Olivia Newton-John and Beth Nielsen Chapman. The goal behind the album was to "create songs with a message of compassion and hope. They are for anyone facing a time of challenge in their life, whether it is grieving a loss – or on the journey to health and recovery." The album debuted at number 72 in Australia.

== Track listing ==
All tracks music and lyrics by Olivia Newton-John, Amy Sky and Beth Nielsen Chapman; except where indicated.

1. "My Heart Goes Out to You" – 2:45
  - Lead vocals by Amy Sky, Olivia Newton-John and Beth Nielsen Chapman
2. "Live On" – 4:11
  - Lead vocals by Olivia Newton-John
3. "Stone in My Pocket" – 3:22
  - Lead vocals by Amy Sky, Olivia Newton-John and Beth Nielsen Chapman
4. "Sand and Water" (Beth Nielsen Chapman) – 4:28
  - Lead vocals by Beth Nielsen Chapman
5. "Forever Blue" (Amy Sky) – 4:48
  - Lead vocals by Amy Sky
6. "Immortality" (Music by Amy Sky, Beth Nielsen Chapman, Olivia Newton-John; Lyrics by Mary Elizabeth Frye) – 3:24
  - Lead vocals by Amy Sky, Olivia Newton-John and Beth Nielsen Chapman
7. "Don't Know What to Say" – 3:27
  - Lead vocals by Beth Nielsen Chapman
8. "Impossible" (Beth Nielsen Chapman, Laureen Smith) – 3:27
  - Lead vocals by Olivia Newton-John
9. "I Will Take Care of You" (Amy Sky, David Pickell) – 4:58
  - Lead vocals by Amy Sky
10. "Grace and Gratitude" (Amy Sky, Olivia Newton-John) – 3:58
  - Lead vocals by Olivia Newton-John
11. "There's Still My Joy" (Beth Nielsen Chapman, Matt Rollings, Melissa Manchester) – 3:10
  - Lead vocals by Olivia Newton-John

== Personnel ==
=== Musicians ===
- Dane Bryant – keyboards, acoustic piano
- Kirby Shelstad – additional keyboards
- Amy Sky – acoustic piano (5, 6)
- Austin Hoke – accordion, cello (1, 11)
- Beth Nielsen Chapman – acoustic guitar
- Kerry Marx – acoustic guitar, electric guitars
- Michael Thompson – acoustic guitar (2), electric guitars (2)
- Dan Dugmore – pedal steel guitar
- Matthew McKenzie – bass (1–5, 7–11)
- Maartin Allcock – bass (6)
- Mark Beckett – drums, percussion
- John Ragusa – flute, penny whistle
- Hattie Webb – harp
- Ezra Jordan, Marc Jordan, Liisi LaFontaine, Kenna Ramsey and Nita Whitaker – choir (2)

Arrangements

- Beth Nielsen Chapman – vocal arrangements (1–4, 6–9, 11)
- Olivia Newton-John – vocal arrangements (1, 4, 6–10)
- Amy Sky – vocal arrangements (1, 4–10), cello arrangements (1, 11), choir arrangements (2)
- Marc Jordan – choir arrangements (2)
- Dane Bryant – string arrangements (5)

=== Production ===
- Beth Nielsen Chapman – producer, additional engineer
- Olivia Newton-John – producer
- Amy Sky – producer
- Bob Katz – tracking
- Kevin Luu – tracking assistant
- Maartin Allcock – additional engineer
- John "Beetle" Bailey – additional engineer, mixing
- Robert Irving – additional engineer, assistant engineer
- Taylor Kernohan – additional engineer, assistant engineer
- David Leonard – additional engineer
- Shelly McErlaine – additional engineer
- John Rausch – additional engineer
- Kirby Shelstad – additional engineer
- Michael Thompson – additional engineer
- Peter Letros – mastering
- Michael Caprio – cover design, artwork
- Denise Truscello – photography
- Elena Petroiu – hair stylist

== Charts ==
Chart (2016–17)	Peak position
Australian Albums (ARIA)	72
Irish Albums (IRMA)	65
Irish Independent Albums (IRMA)	10
Scottish Albums (Official Charts)	63
UK Album Sales (OCC)	64
UK Country Albums (Official Charts)	1
UK Independent Albums (Official Charts)	13

== Release history ==
Country	Date	Label	Format	Catalogue
Australia	7 October 2016	Sony Music Australia	Compact disc, digital download	88985378292
