= Grace and Gratitude =

Studio album by Olivia Newton-John
- Released: 25 August 2006
- Recorded: January–May 2006
- Studio: Echo Beach Studio (Jupiter, Florida)
- Genre: New-age
- Length: 60:32
- Labels: EMI, Green Hill
- Producers: Amy Sky; Tracy Young (Pink edition bonus)

Olivia Newton-John chronology
Stronger Than Before (2005)	Grace and Gratitude (2006)	Christmas Wish (2007)

Alternative covers
- Grace and Gratitude Renewed

Alternative cover
- Pink edition

Singles from Grace and Gratitude
- 1. "Instrument of Peace" Released: 2006; 2. "Help Me to Heal" Released: 2010

Grace and Gratitude is the twenty-first studio album by Australian singer Olivia Newton-John. The album was released 25 August 2006 through EMI exclusively by Walgreens to benefit various charities of cancer and re-released on 14 September 2010 through Green Hill Records as Grace and Gratitude Renewed. A "pink" edition of the original album also was released in certain territories, with a two-track remix bonus CD.

== Singles ==
- The album-closing track, "Instrument of Peace", was released as the album's lead single, peaking at #30 on the U.S. Billboard Adult Contemporary chart and #45 on the Canadian AC charts.
- "Help Me to Heal" was released as a single in 2010, promoting the Renewed re-release.

== Tours ==
Newton-john embarked on two tours to promote the album: a North American tour of 39 concerts, Grace and Gratitude Tour, and an Asian tour of 5 concerts, Body Heart & Spirit Tour. Her 2010 World Tour supported the re-release, Renewed.

== Critical reception ==
Professional ratings
Review scores
Source	Rating
AllMusic	3/5 stars
Billboard	Positive

Stephen Thomas Erlewine from AllMusic gave the album a positive review, although he said: "It's easy to knock this for not exactly being compelling—it glides, it doesn't grab—but that's the whole point: this is meditative mood music and it's gauzily effective in that regard in either of its incarnations".

In their review, Billboard stated that "Grace and Gratitude has a purpose - the long-lived artist's belief that music can boost the body's healing processes...Newton-John puts her spin on diverse influences, from Tibetan chants and Islamic prayers to a Latin benediction. Not exactly "Heart Attack" or "Physical," huh? Newton-John is soulfully committed to every word she sings, and fans will be taken by the plush arrangements, melodic warmth and, of course, the artist's regal vocals."

== Track listing ==
Grace and Gratitude track listing
No.	Title	Writer(s)	Length
1.	"Shekhinah (interlude)"	Amy Sky	2:59
2.	"Pearls on a Chain"	Newton-John, Sky	3:53
3.	"Yesod (interlude)"	Marc Jordan, Sky	1:49
4.	"To Be Wanted"	Sky	4:14
5.	"Hod (interlude)"	Greg Johnston	1:38
6.	"Learn to Love Yourself"	Newton-John, Sky	4:21
7.	"Nezah (interlude)"	Johnston	1:07
8.	"Grace and Gratitude"	Newton-John, Sky	3:23
9.	"Tiferet (interlude)"	Steven MacKinnon	1:28
10.	"Love is Letting Go of Fear"	Newton-John, Sky, MacKinnon	4:11
11.	"Hesed-Gevurah (interlude)"	Johnston	1:28
12.	"Gaté Gaté"	Johnston, Sky	4:04
13.	"Tala' al Badru 'Alayna (interlude)"	Traditional	1:15
14.	"Let Go Let God"	Newton-John, Sky, Kim Bullard	5:05
15.	"Binah (interlude)"	Johnston	0:45
16.	"I Will Lift Up My Eyes"	Sky	5:08
17.	"Hochmah (interlude)"	Sky, Traditional	2:12
18.	"The Power of Now"	Newton-John, Sky	4:44
19.	"Keter (interlude)"	Stephan Moccio	2:36
20.	"Instrument of Peace"	Jordan, Sky, Moccio	4:12

"Pink" edition bonus tracks
No.	Title	Writer(s)	Length
1.	"Magic" (New version)	John Farrar	4:23
2.	"Physical" (New version)	Steve Kipner, Terry Shaddick	4:15

=== Renewed ===
The album was re-released as Grace and Gratitude Renewed on 14 September 2010, four years after the release of the original version. The new edition features new versions of tracks "To Be Wanted", "I Will Lift Up My Eyes" and "Instrument of Peace" with special guests, and also features two new tracks: "Todah" and the single "Help Me to Heal". The Japanese edition also includes the two remixes from the "Pink" edition.

No.	Title	Length
1.	"Shekhinah" (interlude)	2:59
2.	"Pearls on a Chain"	3:53
3.	"Yesod" (interlude)	1:49
4.	"To Be Wanted" (featuring Mark Masri)	4:14
5.	"Hod" (interlude)	1:38
6.	"Learn to Love Yourself"	4:21
7.	"Nezah" (interlude)	1:07
8.	"Grace and Gratitude"	3:23
9.	"Tiferet" (interlude)	1:28
10.	"Love Is Letting Go of Fear"	4:11
11.	"Hesed-Gevurah" (interlude)	1:28
12.	"Gaté Gaté"	4:04
13.	"Ta'la al Badru 'Alayna" (interlude)	1:15
14.	"Let Go Let God"	5:05
15.	"Binah" (interlude)	0:45
16.	"I Will Lift Up My Eyes" (featuring Amy Sky)	5:08
17.	"Todah" (interlude; featuring David Darling)	3:38
18.	"Help Me to Heal"	4:03
19.	"Hochmah" (interlude)	2:12
20.	"The Power of Now"	4:44
21.	"Keter" (interlude)	2:36
22.	"Instrument of Peace" (featuring Marc Jordan)	4:12

== Personnel ==
=== Musicians ===
- Olivia Newton-John – lead vocals, backing vocals (2, 4, 6, 12, 14, 17)
- Amy Sky – keyboards (1, 3, 4, 13, 16, 17), backing vocals (2, 4, 6, 8, 10, 12, 14, 16, 17, 18), oboe (4), oboe arrangement (4, 12, 16), arrangements (11, 13, 19), cello (12, 16), string arrangements (20)
- Stephan Moccio – acoustic piano (2, 4, 6, 8, 18, 19, 20), keyboards (4, 19, 20), arrangements (19)
- Greg Johnston – transition programming, programming (2, 6, 8), string arrangements (2, 18), keyboards (5, 7, 12, 14, 15), cello arrangement (8)
- Steven MacKinnon – keyboards (9, 10), arrangements (10)
- Mike Frances – guitars (1, 3, 13), mandolin (3)
- Rob Piltch – guitars (9, 10)
- Bill Bell – guitars (16)
- George Koller – fretless bass (1, 4), sitar (2, 12, 14, 16), dilruba (5, 12, 14, 16), acoustic bass (6, 14), bass guitar (8, 12, 14, 16)
- Brian Barlow – cymbals (1, 4, 6, 14, 16, 20), vibraphone (1, 14)
- Ed Hanley – percussion (11), Standing bells (11), udu (12, 13), tabla (12, 14, 16)
- Ron Korb – Tibetan flute (1), bass flute (2), shinobue (3), Irish penny whistle (8, 17), dizi (8), Bansuri (13), low whistle (17)
- Cynthia Steljes – oboe (4, 12, 16)
- Paul Wildner – cello (2, 4, 8, 12, 16, 17, 18, 20)
- Jon Craig – viola (2, 18)
- Benjamin Bowman – violin (2, 18, 20)
- Jayne Maddison – violin (2, 18)
- Brenna MacCremmon – backing vocals (12, 14, 16)
- Maryem Tollar – lead vocals (13)
- Marc Jordan – backing vocals (17), harmony vocals (20)

=== Production ===
- Producer – Amy Sky
- Instrumental overdubs recorded by Lorne Hounsell at Signal To Noise (Toronto, Canada).
- Lead vocals recorded by Vic Florencia, assisted by Azra Ross.
- Piano recorded by Azra Ross
- Lead vocals and piano recorded at Maison de Musique (Toronto, Canada).
- BGVs recorded by Greg Johnston
- Mixed by Vic Florencia at The Concrete Jungle (Toronto, Canada).
- Additional ProTools programming – Jeff Dalziel and Azra Ross
- Mastered by Joao Carvahlo at Joao Carvahlo Mastering (Toronto, Canada).
- Art direction – Gabrielle Raumberger
- Design – Kimyio Nishio
- Liner notes, concept and illustrations – Olivia Newton-John
- Hand Mudrahs – Sarina Condello
- Photography – J. Michael Lafond
- Styling – Adrienne Gold
- Hair and make-up – John Sheehy
- Chart preparation – Richard Maslove

== Charts ==
=== Weekly charts ===
2006 weekly chart performance for Grace and Gratitude
Chart (2006)	Peak position
US Billboard New Age Albums	2
US Billboard Christian Albums	36
US Billboard Christian/Gospel Albums	54

2012 weekly chart performance for Grace and Gratitude
Chart (2012)	Peak position
Australian Albums Chart	86

=== Year-end charts ===
Year-end chart performance for Grace and Gratitude
Chart (2010)	Position
US Billboard New Age Albums	15

== Release history ==
Release history for Grace and Gratitude
Country	Date	Label	Edition
United States	25 August 2006	EMI	Standard edition
Canada	27 March 2007	EMI	Standard edition
Hong Kong	April 2007	Universal	Standard edition
Malaysia	April 2007	Universal	Standard edition
Australia	15 October 2007	Universal	Standard edition
United States	14 September 2010	Green Hill	Grace and Gratitude Renewed
Austria	28 September 2010	EQ Music	Grace and Gratitude (Pink edition)
Japan	17 November 2010	EMI	Grace and Gratitude Renewed
