= Christmas Wish (Olivia Newton-John album) =

Studio album by Olivia Newton-John
- Released: October 2007
- Recorded: March–July 2007
- Genre: Christmas
- Length: 61:13
- Label: ONJ
- Producer: Amy Sky

Olivia Newton-John chronology
Grace and Gratitude (2006)	Christmas Wish (2007)	A Celebration in Song (2008)

Christmas Wish is the twenty-second studio album by British-Australian singer Olivia Newton-John. It is the second original album of Christmas music recorded by Newton-John after 'Tis the Season with Vince Gill (Hallmark, 2000), and the compilation partly from that, The Christmas Collection. It is her second album produced by Amy Sky. It features versions of classic Christmas songs and guest appearances from Barry Manilow, Jon Secada, Michael McDonald and others. In 2008, the album was re-released as a Target exclusive and included the bonus track "In the Bleak Midwinter".

== Critical reception ==
Professional ratings
Review scores
Source	Rating
AllMusic	2.5/5 stars

AllMusic editor Stephen Thomas Erlewine called Christmas Wish a "clean, low-key affair, where her versions of traditional Christmas carols [...] are interspersed with brief instrumental interludes. Nothing here is too high-energy, it sometimes borders on the sleepy, but as background holiday mood music, it is effective."

== Track listing ==
All tracks produced by Amy Sky.

Christmas Wish track listing
No.	Title	Writer(s)	Length
1.	"O Come, All Ye Faithful"	Traditional	4:53
2.	"Angels We Have Heard on High" (Interlude)	Traditional	1:13
3.	"Every Time It Snows" (featuring Jon Secada)	Olivia Newton-John; Amy Sky	3:52
4.	"Away in a Manger" (Interlude)	Traditional	1:12
5.	"We Three Kings"	Traditional	4:46
6.	"The First Noel" (Interlude)	Traditional	1:10
7.	"Mother's Christmas Wish" (featuring Jim Brickman)	Newton-John; Sky	4:59
8.	"Jesu, Joy of Man's Desiring" (Interlude)	Traditional	1:22
9.	"Angels in the Snow"	Steven MacKinnon; Sky	3:18
10.	"What Child Is This?" (Interlude) (featuring Pavlo)	Traditional	1:28
11.	"Silent Night" (featuring Jann Arden)	Traditional	4:56
12.	"O Come, O Come, Emmanuel" (Interlude)	Traditional	1:30
13.	"All Through the Night" (featuring Michael McDonald)	Traditional	3:39
14.	"The Little Drummer Boy" (Interlude)	Traditional	1:03
15.	"Underneath the Same Sky"	Newton-John; Sky; Randy Goodrum	3:12
16.	"O Christmas Tree" (Interlude)	Traditional	1:33
17.	"Little Star of Bethlehem"	Newton-John; Sky; Stephen Moccio	4:41
18.	"Deck the Halls" (Interlude)	Traditional	0:57
19.	"Instrument of Peace" (featuring Marc Jordan)	Sky; Moccio; Jordan	3:12
20.	"We Wish You a Merry Christmas" (Interlude)	Traditional	1:40
21.	"Christmas on My Radio"	Newton-John; Sky	3:53
22.	"A Gift of Love" (featuring Barry Manilow)	Manilow; Bruce Sussman	2:30

Target 2008 reissue bonus track
No.	Title	Writer(s)	Length
23.	"In the Bleak Midwinter"	Traditional	5:13

== Personnel ==
Performers and musicians

- Olivia Newton-John – vocals, harmony vocals (9)
- Greg Johnston – keyboards (1, 5, 7, 15), guitars (15), bass guitar (15)
- Mark Lalama – acoustic piano (1, 5, 11, 13, 21, 23), keyboards (7)
- Roman SebastIan – keyboards (2, 6, 8, 10, 12, 14, 16, 18, 20)
- David Foster – keyboards (3), acoustic piano (3), string arrangements (3)
- Mark Masri – keyboards (4), backing vocals (15, 21)
- Jim Brickman – acoustic piano (7)
- Steven MacKinnon – acoustic piano (9), accordion (9)
- Stephen Moccio – keyboards (17, 19), acoustic piano (17, 19)
- Jamie Oakes – guitars (7, 11, 23), dobro (11)
- Pavlo Simtikidis – guitar (10)
- Andy Timmons – guitars (21)
- George Koller – bass guitar (1, 5, 7, 11, 21, 23), dilruba (23)
- Mark Kelso – percussion (1, 5, 11, 23), drums (7, 15, 19, 21)
- Ron Korb – low whistle (1), tin whistle (1), bansuri (5), bass flute (11), C flute (11)
- Paul Widner – cello (4, 9, 11)
- Amy Shulman – harp (13, 19)
- Stephanie O'Keefe – French horn (13, 19)
- Warren Ham – saxophone (21)
- Phil Manos – orchestration (3), orchestral arrangements (13, 19)
- The Westlake Players – orchestra (13, 19)
- Robbie Buchanan – arrangements (22), string arrangements and conductor (22)
- Zoe Sky Jordan – backing vocals (1)
- Lauren Mayer – backing vocals (1)
- Amy Sky – backing vocals (1, 5, 11, 15, 17, 21, 23), arrangements (1, 5, 11, 13, 23), French backing vocals (11), keyboards (12, 15)
- Jon Secada – vocals (3)
- Marc Jordan – backing vocals (5), harmony vocals (19)
- Jann Arden – vocals (11)
- Steve Real – Spanish backing vocals (11)
- Michael McDonald – vocals (13)
- Amoy Levy – backing vocals (15, 21)
- Barry Manilow – vocals (22), arrangements (22)

Technical

- Amy Sky – producer (1–21, 23), additional production (22)
- Robbie Buchanan – producer (22)
- Barry Manilow – producer (22)
- Steve Addabbo – recording
- Jim "Pinky" Beeman – recording
- David Bryant – recording
- Zack Fagan – recording
- Vic Florencia – recording, mixing (1–21, 23), additional mixing (22)
- Brian Friedman – recording
- Humberto Gatica – recording
- Michael Jack – recording
- Jared Kvitka – recording
- Michael Medina – recording
- Ted Onyszczak – recording
- Bill Schnee – recording, mixing (22)
- Dustin Su – recording
- Brian Wohlgemuth – recording
- Matthew Zimmerman – recording
- Steve Crowder – recording assistant
- Scott Erickson – recording assistant
- Rocky Grisez – recording assistant
- Greg Kolchinsky – recording assistant
- Greg Johnston – additional engineer
- Mark Kelso – additional engineer
- Steven MacKinnon – additional engineer
- Azra Ross – additional engineer
- Joao Carvalho – mastering
- Paul Jarmon – creative direction
- Megan Schaefer – art direction
- Jennifer Bergstrom – graphic design
- Michael Caprio – cover design
- J. Michael Lafond – photography

Studios

- Recorded at Concrete Jungle, Lenz Entertainment, Phase One Studios, Silverbirch Productions, Hey World Studios and The Nucleus (Toronto, Ontario, Canada); Chartmaker Studios, The Cat's Room and The Document Room (Malibu, California); Capitol Studios (Hollywood, California); Gari Entertainment (Westlake, California); Shelter Island Sound (New York City, New York); Ocean Way Recording (Nashville, Tennessee); Wild Sound (Minneapolis, Minnesota); Palace Cleaners (Irving, Texas).
- Mixed at Concrete Jungle
- Mastered at Joao Carvalho Mastering (Toronto, Ontario, Canada).

== Charts ==
Chart performance for Christmas Wish
Chart (2007)	Peak position
US Billboard 200	187
US Independent Albums (Billboard)	21
UK Independent Albums (OCC)	40
US Top Holiday Albums (Billboard)	22
US Top Catalog Albums (Billboard)	49
