= Friends for Christmas =

Studio album by John Farnham and Olivia Newton-John
- Released: 11 November 2016
- Recorded: 2016
- Studios: Playback Recording Studio, Santa Barbara, California
- Length: 38:50
- Label: Universal
- Producer: Chong Lim

John Farnham chronology
Two Strong Hearts Live (2015)	Friends for Christmas (2016)

Olivia Newton-John chronology
Liv On (2016)	Friends for Christmas (2016)	Hopelessly Devoted: The Hits (2018)

Friends for Christmas is a collaborative Christmas album by John Farnham and Olivia Newton-John. It was recorded at Playback Recording Studio in Santa Barbara, California, produced by Farnham's long-time music director Chong Lim, and released through Sony Music Australia on 11 November 2016 on CD and digital download. The album features well-known traditional holiday standards, by mostly American composers. It was re-released in 2017 with three additional tracks. Friends for Christmas was the final studio album released during Olivia Newton-John's lifetime as well as John Farnham’s Final Recording before his Oral Cancer Diagnosis, both in 2022.

== Synopsis ==
Friends for Christmas is Farnham's first Christmas album in 46 years; when billed as "Johnny" he released the album Christmas Is Johnny Farnham in 1970. It is Newton-John's fourth, the most recent being This Christmas (2012) recorded with her Grease co-star, John Travolta. Farnham and Newton-John promoted the album in Australia in November.

=== Artists' press statements ===
Farnham said: "I have always loved working with Olivia. To record a Christmas album seemed like the right, almost inevitable thing to do. I hope everyone enjoys listening to it as much as we loved recording it together." Newton-John said: "It was such a joy singing these beautiful holiday songs with my favourite singer and good mate John Farnham. The holidays are about family and friends and having this chance to sing these classics with John was pure fun from beginning to end!"

Farnham and [Newton-John performed together in concert numerous times, and released two ARIA number-one albums: Highlights from The Main Event in 1998, from The Main Event Tour, also featuring Anthony Warlow and Two Strong Hearts Live in 2015.

== Critical reception ==
Cameron Adams and Mikey Cahill from News.com.au gave the album three-and-a-half stars out of five and said: "In a sea of corporate Christmas albums, this has a welcome quality missing from most: authenticity. First, they're actual friends and Farnsey insisted on them recording together, eye-to-eye." They added: "Everything here is turned into a duet (and) producer Chong Lim hasn't done much except capture the voices and add choirs and orchestration to make it as lush as you'd expect."

Samantha Jonscher from The Music gave the album two-and-a-half out of five, writing: "If you are the music programmer for David Jones this Christmas season then this is the Yuletide album for you. The Broadway smiles one imagines plastered across their faces may not be contagious, but the "cheer" will certainly be heard over even the most frantic Christmas Eve shopper's pounding, desperate heartbeat."

== Chart performance ==
Friends for Christmas debuted at number 3 on the Australian Albums Chart and reached number 1 in its fifth week of charting on 19 December 2016. It became the tenth chart topper for Farnham and the fifth for Newton-John. The album came in sixth on the 2016 year-end albums chart, and 22nd on the 2017 year-end chart published by the Australian Recording Industry Association (ARIA). Also in 2017, Friends for Christmas was certified double platinum in Australia. The album returned to the Australian top 10 in December 2017 and again in 2018.

== Track listing ==
All tracks produced by Chong Lim.

Friends for Christmas track listing
No.	Title	Writer(s)	Length
1.	"Let It Snow! Let It Snow! Let It Snow!"	Sammy Cahn; Jule Styne	2:35
2.	"It's Beginning to Look a Lot Like Christmas"	Meredith Willson	2:49
3.	"Have Yourself a Merry Little Christmas"	Hugh Martin; Ralph Blane	4:10
4.	"Santa Claus Is Coming to Town"	John Frederick Coots; Haven Gillespie	2:40
5.	"The Christmas Song"	Mel Tormé; Robert Wells	3:27
6.	"Winter Wonderland"	Felix Bernard; Richard B. Smith	2:54
7.	"Baby, It's Cold Outside"	Frank Loesser	3:18
8.	"Silent Night"	Joseph Mohr; Franz Xaver Gruber	3:11
9.	"White Christmas"	Irving Berlin	3:34
10.	"The Little Drummer Boy"	Katherine Kennicott Davis	4:33
11.	"Silver Bells"	Jay Livingston; Ray Evans	2:58
12.	"Hark! The Herald Angels Sing"	Traditional	2:35

2017 Deluxe edition – bonus tracks
No.	Title	Writer(s)	Length
13.	"The First Noel"	Traditional	5:01
14.	"Here Comes Santa Claus"	Gene Autry; Oakley Haldeman	3:08
15.	"One Little Christmas Tree"	Bryan Wells; Ronald Miller	3:19

== Charts ==
=== Weekly charts ===
Weekly chart performance for Friends for Christmas
Chart (2016)	Peak position
Australian Albums (ARIA)	1

=== Year-end charts ===
2016 year-end chart performance for Friends for Christmas
Chart (2016)	Position
Australian Albums (ARIA)	6

2017 year-end chart performance for Friends for Christmas
Chart (2017)	Position
Australian Albums (ARIA)	22

=== Decade-end charts ===
Decade-end chart performance for Friends for Christmas
Chart (2010–2019)	Position
Australian Albums (ARIA)	95
Australian Artist Albums (ARIA)	18

== Certifications ==
Certifications for Friends for Christmas
Region	Certification	Certified units/sales
Australia (ARIA)	2× Platinum	140,000^{^}
^{^} Shipments figures based on certification alone.

== Release history ==
Release history for Friends for Christmas
Region	Date	Label	Edition	Format	Catalogue	Ref(s)
Australia	11 November 2016	Sony Music Australia	Standard edition	CD; digital download	88985387172	
Australia	17 November 2017	Sony Music Australia	Deluxe edition	CD; digital download	88985498012	
Australia	1 December 2023	Sony Music Australia	Standard edition	LP	19658861521	

== See also ==
- List of number-one albums of 2016 (Australia)
