= Two Strong Hearts Live =

Live album by John Farnham and Olivia Newton-John
- Released: 16 June 2015
- Recorded: Melbourne, April 2015
- Length: 79:06
- Label: Universal

John Farnham chronology
The Acoustic Chapel Sessions (2011)	Two Strong Hearts Live (2015)	Friends for Christmas (2016)

Olivia Newton-John chronology
Hotel Sessions (2014)	Two Strong Hearts Live (2015)	Liv On (2016)

Two Strong Hearts Live is a live album by John Farnham and Olivia Newton-John recorded in Melbourne with Philharmonia Australia in April 2015. The live album was released on 16 June 2015 with the live DVD being released on 21 August 2015.

== Critical reception ==
Cameron Adams gave the album 4 out of 5 stars saying, "John Farnham and Olivia Newton-John have a chemistry and friendship you just can’t fake. And zero egos. The fact these two were having serious fun is not lost in the recorded translation. You also see new sides, like Farnham blitzing 'Over the Rainbow' and Livvie cutting loose with rock wailing on 'Hit the Road Jack'. That’s another one of the joys here, we rarely get to hear Olivia live and from the divine thrills of 'Xanadu' to the spine chills of I Honestly Love You it’s our loss. On the Grease favourites 'Summer Nights' and 'You’re the One That I Want', Farnham slips into John Travolta mode [and] Farnham sings 'Olivia Newton-John' better than ONJ’s original duet partner".

== Chart performance ==
Two Strong Hearts Live debuted at number one on the ARIA Charts. This marked the second time Farnham and Newton-John had topped the charts together; in 1998, their Highlights from The Main Event album (with Anthony Warlow) also peaked at number one.

== Track listing ==
1. "Overture”
2. "Two Strong Hearts"
3. "Let Me Be There"
4. "Xanadu"
5. "I Honestly Love You"
6. "Tenterfield Saddler"
7. "No One Comes Close"
8. "Love to Shine"
9. "Suddenly"
10. "Dare to Dream"
11. "Somewhere Over the Rainbow"
12. "Burn for You"
13. "Hit the Road Jack / Fever"
14. "You're the One That I Want"
15. "Summer Nights"
16. "Hearts on Fire"
17. "If Not for You"
18. "Everytime You Cry"
19. "Physical"
20. "You're the Voice"
21. "It's a Long Way to the Top (If You Wanna Rock 'n' Roll)"

== Charts ==
=== Weekly charts ===
Weekly chart performance for Two Strong Hearts Live
Chart (2015)	Peak position
Australian Albums (ARIA)	1

=== Year-end charts ===
Year-end chart performance for Two Strong Hearts Live
Chart (2015)	Position
Australian Albums (ARIA)	31

== Certifications ==
Certifications for Two Strong Hearts Live
Region	Certification	Certified units/sales
Australia (ARIA) video	Platinum	15,000^{^}
Australia (ARIA)	Gold	35,000^{^}
New Zealand (RMNZ)	Gold	7,500^{‡}
^{^} Shipments figures based on certification alone.^{‡} Sales+streaming figures based on certification alone.

== See also ==
- List of number-one albums of 2015 (Australia)
