= Olivia Newton-John =

British and Australian singer (1948–2022)

Dame Olivia Newton-John AC DBE
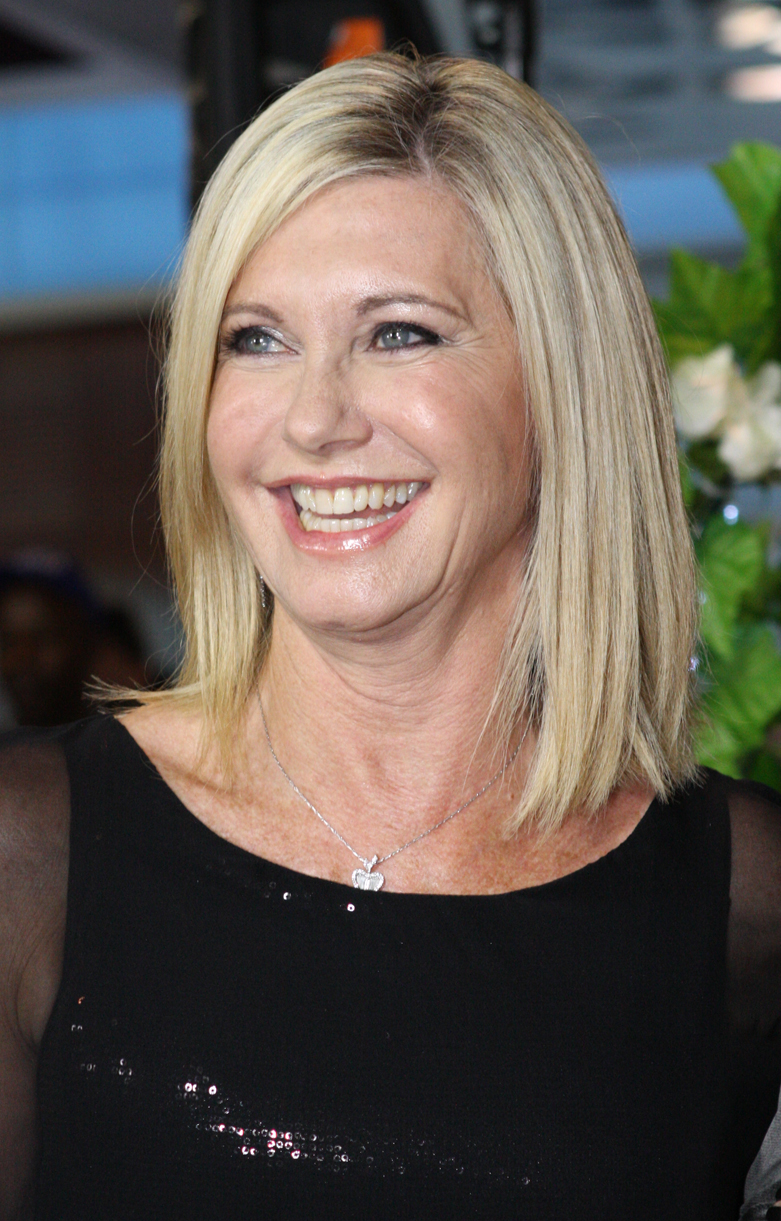
- Newton-John in 2012
- Born: 26 September 1948; Cambridge, England
- Died: 8 August 2022 (aged 73); Santa Ynez, California, US
- Citizenship: United Kingdom; Australia
- Occupations: Singer; songwriter; actress
- Years active: 1963–2022
- Works: Albums; singles; videography
- Spouses: Matt Lattanzi (m. 1984; div. 1995); John Easterling (m. 2008)
- Children: Chloe Lattanzi
- Father: Brinley Newton-John
- Relatives: Max Born (grandfather); Victor Ehrenberg (great-grandfather); Brett Goldsmith (nephew); Tottie Goldsmith (niece); Emerson Newton-John (nephew); Gustav Victor Rudolf Born (uncle); Georgina Born (cousin); Ben Elton (third cousin)
- Awards: Full list
- Musical career
- Origin: Melbourne, Australia
- Genres: Pop; country; country pop; soft rock
- Instrument: Vocals
- Labels: Uni; MCA; EMI; Pye; Festival; Geffen
- Website: olivianewton-john.com

Dame Olivia Newton-John AC DBE (26 September 1948 – 8 August 2022) was a British and Australian singer, songwriter and actress. With over 100 million records sold, Newton-John is one of the best-selling music artists of all time, as well as the highest-selling female Australian recording artist of all time.

In 1978, Newton-John starred in the musical film Grease, which was the highest-grossing musical film at the time and whose soundtrack remains one of the world's best-selling albums. It features two major hit duets with co-star John Travolta: "You're the One That I Want"—which is one of the best-selling singles of all time—and "Summer Nights". This soundtrack also includes her solo "Hopelessly Devoted to You." Her signature solo recordings include the Record of the Year Grammy winner "I Honestly Love You" (1974) and "Physical" (1981)—Billboard's highest-ranking Hot 100 single of the 1980s. Other defining hit singles include "If Not for You" and "Banks of the Ohio" (both 1971), "Let Me Be There" (1973), "If You Love Me (Let Me Know)" (1974), "Have You Never Been Mellow" (1975), "Sam" (1977), "Hopelessly Devoted to You" (1978; also from Grease), "A Little More Love" (1978), "Twist of Fate" (1983) and, from the 1980 film Xanadu, "Magic" and "Xanadu" (with the Electric Light Orchestra).

Newton-John's accolades include four Grammy Awards, a Daytime Emmy Award, nine Billboard Music Awards, six American Music Awards, a star on the Hollywood Walk of Fame and an induction into the ARIA Hall of Fame. She scored fifteen top-ten singles, including five number-one singles on the Billboard Hot 100, and two number-one albums on the Billboard 200: If You Love Me, Let Me Know (1974) and Have You Never Been Mellow (1975). Eleven of her singles (including two Platinum) and fourteen of her albums (including two Platinum and four 2× Platinum) have been certified Gold by the Recording Industry Association of America (RIAA). Newton-John represented United Kingdom in the Eurovision Song Contest 1974 with the song "Long Live Love", finishing in fourth place. She was appointed Officer of the Order of Australia in 2006 and Dame Commander of the Order of the British Empire in 2020.

Newton-John, who had breast cancer three times, was an advocate and sponsor for breast cancer research. In 2012, the Olivia Newton-John Cancer & Wellness Centre at the Austin Hospital opened in her home town of Melbourne; in 2015, the facility was rechristened the Olivia Newton-John Cancer Wellness & Research Centre. She was also an activist for environmental and animal rights causes.

== Early life and family ==
Olivia Newton-John was born on 26 September 1948 in Cambridge to Brinley "Brin" Newton-John (1914–1992) and Irene Helene (née Born; 1914–2003). Her father was born and raised in Wales to a middle-class family. Her mother was born and raised in Germany to a German-Jewish academic family who came to the UK in 1933 to escape the Nazi regime.

Newton-John's maternal grandfather was German Jewish Nobel Prize–winning physicist Max Born. Her maternal grandmother Hedwig was the daughter of German Jewish jurist Victor Ehrenberg and his Lutheran wife, Helene Agatha von Jhering. Through Helene Agatha, Newton-John was a descendant of Protestant theologian Martin Luther. She was also descended from an unspecified Spanish monarch. Helene Agatha's own father, Newton-John's great-great-grandfather, was jurist Rudolf von Jhering. Newton-John's uncle was pharmacologist Gustav Victor Rudolf Born. Through her Ehrenberg line, Newton-John was a third cousin of comedian Ben Elton.

Newton-John's father was an MI5 officer on the Enigma project at Bletchley Park who took Rudolf Hess into custody during World War II. After the war, he became the headmaster of the Cambridgeshire High School for Boys and was in this post when Newton-John was born.

In early 1954, when Newton-John was five, her family emigrated to Melbourne, Victoria, on the SS Strathaird. Her father worked as a professor of German and as the master of Ormond College at the University of Melbourne and served as the head of the Presbyterian college.

Newton-John attended Christ Church Grammar School in the Melbourne suburb of South Yarra and then the University High School in Parkville.

Newton-John was the youngest of three children. The eldest sibling was Hugh Newton-John, who became a physician and infectious diseases specialist. Newton-John's older sister, Rona Newton-John, became a model and actress whose acting career in the UK included appearances on The Benny Hill Show and Gerry Anderson's UFO. Rona was married three times and had four children including, from her first marriage (1961–1968) to restaurateur and nightclub owner Brian Goldsmith, music producer Brett Goldsmith and entertainer Tottie Goldsmith, a founder member of the band The Chantoozies. Racing car driver Emerson Newton-John is the son from her second marriage to Graham Hall, and Rona was also married from 1980 to 1985 to Grease and Taxi actor Jeff Conaway.

Newton-John's parents divorced in 1958. Her father Brin remarried two more times and also had two more children with his second wife.

== Career ==
=== Career beginnings ===
Newton-John went to primary school with Daryl Braithwaite, who also followed a singing career. At age 14, with three classmates, Newton-John formed a short-lived, all-girl group called Sol Four which often performed at a coffee shop owned by her brother-in-law.

Newton-John originally wanted to become a veterinarian but then chose to focus on performance after doubting her ability to pass science exams.

In 1964, Newton-John's acting talent was first recognised portraying Lady Mary Lasenby in her University High School's production of The Admirable Crichton as she became the Young Sun's Drama Award best schoolgirl actress runner-up. She then became a regular on local Australian television shows, including Time for Terry and HSV-7's The Happy Show, where she performed as "Lovely Livvy". She also appeared on The Go!! Show, where she met her future duet partner, singer Pat Carroll, and her future music producer, John Farrar. (Carroll and Farrar later married.)

In 1965, she entered and won a talent contest on the television program Sing, Sing, Sing, hosted by 1960s Australian icon Johnny O'Keefe. She performed the songs "Anyone Who Had a Heart" and "Everything's Coming Up Roses". She was initially reluctant to use her prize, a trip to Great Britain, but travelled there nearly a year later after her mother encouraged her to broaden her horizons.

While in Britain, Newton-John missed her then-boyfriend, Ian Turpie, with whom she had co-starred in the 1965 Australian telefilm Funny Things Happen Down Under. She repeatedly booked trips back to Australia that her mother cancelled.

In 1966, Newton-John recorded her first single, "Till You Say You'll Be Mine", in Britain for Decca Records.

Newton-John's outlook changed when Pat Carroll moved to the UK. The two formed a duo called Pat and Olivia and toured nightclubs in Europe. (In one incident, they were booked at Paul Raymond's Revue in Soho, London, and were unaware that it was a strip club until they began to perform onstage dressed primly in frilly high-collared dresses.) During this period, she and Carroll contributed backup vocals to recordings by a number of other artists, notably the song "Come In, You'll Get Pneumonia" by the Easybeats. After Carroll's visa expired, Carroll was forced to return to Australia but Newton-John remained in Britain to pursue solo work.

Newton-John was recruited for the group Toomorrow, formed by American producer Don Kirshner. In 1970, the group starred in the science fiction musical Toomorrow and recorded an accompanying soundtrack album on RCA Records; both the LP and the movie were named after the group. That same year, the group made two single recordings: "You're My Baby Now"/"Goin' Back" and "I Could Never Live Without Your Love"/"Roll Like a River". Neither track became a chart success; the project failed and the group disbanded.

=== 1971–1974: Early success ===
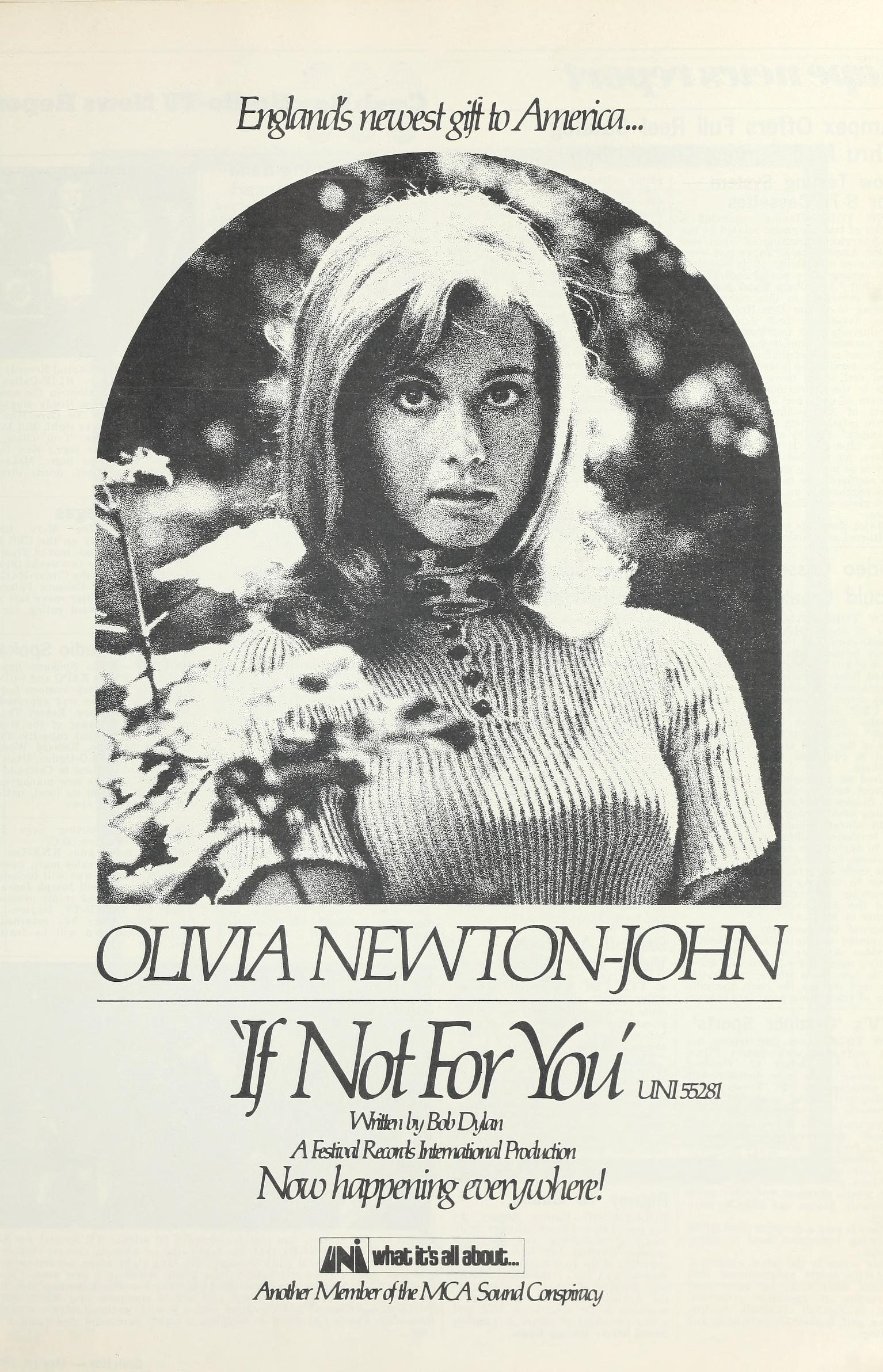
Cashbox advertisement, 15 May 1971

In 1971, Newton-John released her first solo album, If Not for You (US No. 158 Pop). In the UK, the album was released as Olivia Newton-John. The title track, written by Bob Dylan, was her first international hit (US No. 25 Pop, No. 1 Adult Contemporary/"AC"). Her follow-up single, "Banks of the Ohio", was a top 10 hit in the UK and Australia, but only peaked at number 94 in the United States. She was voted Best British Female Vocalist two years in a row by the magazine Record Mirror. She made frequent appearances on Cliff Richard's weekly show It's Cliff Richard and starred with him in the telefilm The Case.

Newton-John's 1972 single "What Is Life" (No. 34 AC) made minimal impact in the United States. As a result, her second studio album Olivia was never formally issued in the United States. The subsequent single, "Take Me Home, Country Roads", similarly saw little success. Her fortune changed with the release of "Let Me Be There" in 1973. The song reached the American top 10 on the Pop (No. 6), Country (No. 7), and AC (No. 3) charts and earned her a Grammy for Best Country Female and an Academy of Country Music award for Most Promising Female Vocalist.

Her third studio album Let Me Be There was released in November 1973, retitled Music Makes My Day in Britain. The US and Canadian versions featured an alternate track list that mixed new cuts with selections from Olivia and also recycled six songs from If Not for You, which was going out of print.

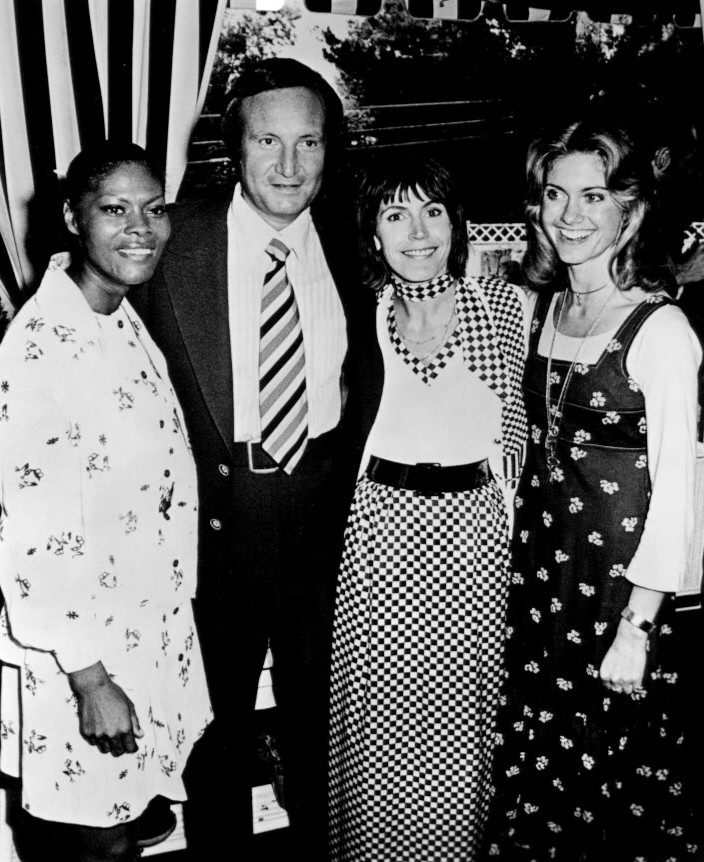
From left to right: Dionne Warwick, Don Kirshner, Helen Reddy, and Newton-John in 1974

In 1974, Newton-John represented the United Kingdom in the Eurovision Song Contest with the song "Long Live Love". The song was chosen for Newton-John by the British public out of six possible entries (Newton-John later admitted that she disliked the song). Newton-John finished fourth at the contest with 14 points, held in Brighton, behind the Swedish winning entry, "Waterloo" by ABBA. All six Eurovision contest song candidates—"Have Love, Will Travel", "Lovin' You Ain't Easy", "Long Live Love", "Someday", "Angel Eyes" and "Hands Across the Sea"—were recorded by Newton-John and included on her Long Live Love album, her first for the EMI Records label.

The Long Live Love album was released in the US and Canada as If You Love Me, Let Me Know. All the Eurovision entries were dropped for different and more country-flavoured tunes intended to capitalise on the success of "Let Me Be There"; the North American offering used selections from Long Live Love, Olivia and Music Makes My Day, and only the title cut was new. The album reached No. 1 on both the pop (one week) and country (eight weeks) albums charts. If You Love Me, Let Me Know's title track was its first single and reached No. 5 Pop, No. 2 Country (her highest-peaking song on the chart) and No. 2 AC. The next single, "I Honestly Love You", became Newton-John's signature song. Written and composed by Jeff Barry and Peter Allen, the ballad became her first Pop number-one (staying there for two weeks), second AC number-one (for three weeks) and third top-10 Country (No. 6) hit and earned Newton-John two more Grammys for Record of the Year and Best Pop Vocal Performance – Female. In her 2018 autobiography, Don't Stop Believin', Newton-John describes "I Honestly Love You" as a song which is "so simple, with a meaning that was deeper than the ocean". In 1974, she received the (BCMA) British Country Music Association Award for "Female Vocalist of the Year" in London, England.

In the United States, Newton-John's success in country music sparked a debate among purists, who took issue with a foreigner singing country-flavoured pop music being classed with native Nashville artists. In addition to her Grammy for "Let Me Be There", in 1974 Newton-John was also named the Country Music Association Female Vocalist of the Year, a designation which made her the first British singer to have won the award; and the title also meant she defeated more established Nashville-based nominees Loretta Lynn, Dolly Parton and Tanya Tucker, as well as Canadian artist Anne Murray.

This protest by country music participants led to the formation of the short-lived Association of Country Entertainers (ACE). Newton-John was eventually supported by the country music community. Stella Parton, Dolly's sister, recorded "Ode to Olivia" and Newton-John recorded her 1976 album, Don't Stop Believin', in Nashville, Tennessee.

=== 1975–1977: Have You Never Been Mellow, Clearly Love, and continued success ===
Encouraged by expatriate Australian singer Helen Reddy, Newton-John left the UK and moved to the US. Newton-John topped the Pop (one week) and Country (six weeks) albums charts with her next album, Have You Never Been Mellow. For 45 years, Olivia held the Guinness World Record for the shortest gap (154 days) by a female between new Number 1 albums (If You Love Me, Let Me Know > Have You Never Been Mellow) on the US Billboard 200 album charts until Taylor Swift in 2020 (140 days with folklore > evermore).

The Have You Never Been Mellow album generated two singles – the John Farrar-penned title track (No. 1 Pop, No. 3 Country, No. 1 AC) and "Please Mr. Please" (No. 3 Pop, No. 5 Country, No. 1 AC).

Her pop career cooled with the release of her next album, Clearly Love. Her streak of five consecutive gold top 10 singles on the Billboard Hot 100 ended when the album's first single, "Something Better to Do", stopped at No. 13 (also No. 19 Country and No. 1 AC). Her albums still achieved gold status, and she returned to the top ten of the Hot 100 and Billboard 200 charts again in 1978.

Newton-John's singles continued to top the AC chart, where she amassed ten No. 1 singles, including a record seven consecutively:

- "I Honestly Love You" (1974) – 3 weeks
- "Have You Never Been Mellow" (1975) – 1 week
- "Please Mr. Please" (1975) – 3 weeks
- "Something Better to Do" (1975) – 3 weeks
- "Let It Shine"/"He Ain't Heavy, He's My Brother" (1976) – 2 weeks
- "Come on Over" (1976) – 1 week
- "Don't Stop Believin'" (1976) – 1 week

She provided a prominent, but uncredited, vocal on John Denver's "Fly Away" single, which was succeeded by her own single, "Let It Shine"/"He Ain't Heavy, He's My Brother", at No. 1 on the AC chart. ("Fly Away" returned to No. 1 after the two-week reign of "Let It Shine".) In December 1975, she appeared on the ABC special John Denver – A Rocky Mountain Christmas, where she performed the duet of "Fly Away" with John, as well as "Let It Shine". Newton-John also continued to reach the Country top 10 where she tallied seven top-10 singles through 1976's "Come on Over" (No. 23 Pop, No. 5 Country, No. 1 AC) (from the same-titled album) and six consecutive (of a career nine total) top-10 albums through 1976's Don't Stop Believin' (No. 30 Pop, No. 7 Country). She headlined her first US television special, A Special Olivia Newton-John, in November 1976.

In 1977, the single "Sam", a mid-tempo waltz from Don't Stop Believin', returned her to the No. 1 spot on the AC (No. 40 Country) and also reached No. 20 Pop, her highest chart placement since "Something Better to Do". By mid-1977, Newton-John's pop, AC, and country success all suffered a slight blow. Her Making a Good Thing Better album (No. 34 Pop, No. 13 Country) was not certified gold, and its only single, the title track (No. 87 Pop, No. 20 AC), did not reach the AC top 10 or the Country chart. Later that year, Olivia Newton-John's Greatest Hits (No. 13 Pop, No. 7 Country) became her first platinum album.

Newton-John was appointed Officer of the Order of the British Empire (OBE) in the 1979 New Year Honours and Dame Commander of the Order of the British Empire (DBE) in the 2020 New Year Honours for services to charity, cancer research, and entertainment.

=== 1978–1979: Grease and Totally Hot ===
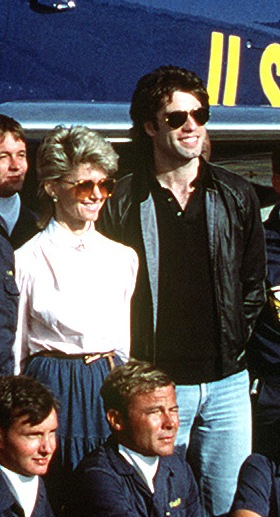
Newton-John appearing with John Travolta in 1982

In 1978, Newton-John's career soared after she starred as Sandy in the film adaptation of the Broadway musical Grease. She was offered the role after meeting producer Allan Carr at a dinner party at Helen Reddy's home. Disillusioned by her Toomorrow experience and concerned that she was too old to play a high school senior (she was 28 during the filming of Grease), Newton-John insisted on a screen test with the film's co-lead, John Travolta. Newton-John previewed some of the film's soundtrack during her second American network television special, Olivia, featuring guests ABBA and Andy Gibb.

Grease became the biggest box-office hit of 1978. Newton-John's performance, however, received mixed reviews. The soundtrack album spent 12 non-consecutive weeks at No. 1 and yielded three Top 5 singles for Newton-John: the platinum "You're the One That I Want" (No. 1 Pop, No. 23 AC) with John Travolta, the gold "Hopelessly Devoted to You" (No. 3 Pop, No. 20 Country, No. 7 AC) and the gold "Summer Nights" (No. 5 Pop, No. 21 AC) with John Travolta and the film's cast. Newton-John became the second woman (after Linda Ronstadt in 1977) to have two singles—"Hopelessly Devoted to You" and "Summer Nights"—in the Billboard top 5 simultaneously. The soundtrack is one of the best-selling soundtracks of all time. In June 2006, Newton-John's company ON-J Productions Ltd filed a lawsuit against Universal Music Group (UMG) for $1 million in unpaid royalties from the Grease soundtrack. In 2007, it was announced that she and UMG had reached a "conditional settlement".

Newton-John's performance earned her a People's Choice Award for Favourite Film Actress. She was nominated for a Golden Globe as Best Actress in a Musical and performed the Oscar-nominated "Hopelessly Devoted to You" at the 1979 Academy Awards. The film's popularity has endured. It was re-released for its 20th anniversary in 1998 and ranked as the second highest-grossing film behind Titanic in its opening weekend. Following her death in August 2022, AMC announced that the picture would reappear in some of its cinemas over the weekend and that a portion of the proceeds would go to breast cancer research.

In November 1978, she released her next studio album, Totally Hot, which became her first solo top-10 (No. 7) album since Have You Never Been Mellow. Dressed on the cover all in leather, Newton-John capitalised on her character's look that was introduced at the end of Grease; moreover, Totally Hot's singles—"A Little More Love" (No. 3 Pop, No. 94 Country, No. 4 AC), "Deeper Than the Night" (No. 11 Pop, No. 87 Country, No. 4 AC), and the title track (No. 52 Pop)—all demonstrated a more aggressive and uptempo sound for Newton-John. Although the album de-emphasised the country sound, the LP still reached No. 4 on the Country Albums chart. Newton-John released the B-side, "Dancin' 'Round and 'Round", of the "Totally Hot" single to Country radio. The entry peaked at No. 29 (as well as No. 82 Pop and No. 25 AC), and it became her last charted solo Country airplay single.

Newton-John cancelled a 1978 concert tour of Japan in protest of the slaughter of dolphins caught in tuna fishing nets. She subsequently rescheduled the tour when the Japanese government assured her that the practice was being curbed. In honour of dolphins, in 1981 she also composed and recorded the song "The Promise (the Dolphin Song)" on the Physical album.

She was a performer on the 1979 Music for UNICEF Concert for the UN's International Year of the Child televised worldwide. During the concert, artists performed songs for which they donated their royalties, some in perpetuity, to benefit the cause.

==== Lawsuit against MCA Records ====
In April 1975, Newton-John and MCA entered into an initial two-year, four-album deal in which she was expected to deliver two LPs a year for the record company. MCA also had the option of extending the contract for six more records and three more years; and if the artist did not deliver on time, MCA was allegedly allowed to lengthen the term of the contract.

Per her new agreement with MCA, Newton-John's first three albums, beginning with Clearly Love, came out on schedule. Her fourth, Making a Good Thing Better, was late. This delay occurred around the same time she was working on Grease for RSO Records, and the postponement arguably gave MCA—which seemed to want to keep its hold on the performer—the right to exercise its option, extend its contract, and stop her from signing with another enterprise. She also did not deliver a "newly optioned" album.

On 31 May 1978, Newton-John and MCA each filed breach-of-contract actions against the other. Newton-John sued for $10 million and claimed that MCA's failure to adequately promote and advertise her product freed her from their agreement. MCA's countersuit requested $1 million in damages and an injunction against Newton-John working with another music firm.

Ultimately, Newton-John was forbidden from offering her recording services to another label until the five-year pact had run its course. The original covenant was not automatically extended, though she had not duly supplied the total sum of vinyls indicated in the contract.

As a result of the lawsuit, record companies changed their contracts to be based on the number of albums recorded by a musician and not a specific number of years.

=== 1980–1988: Physical, Soul Kiss, and The Rumour ===
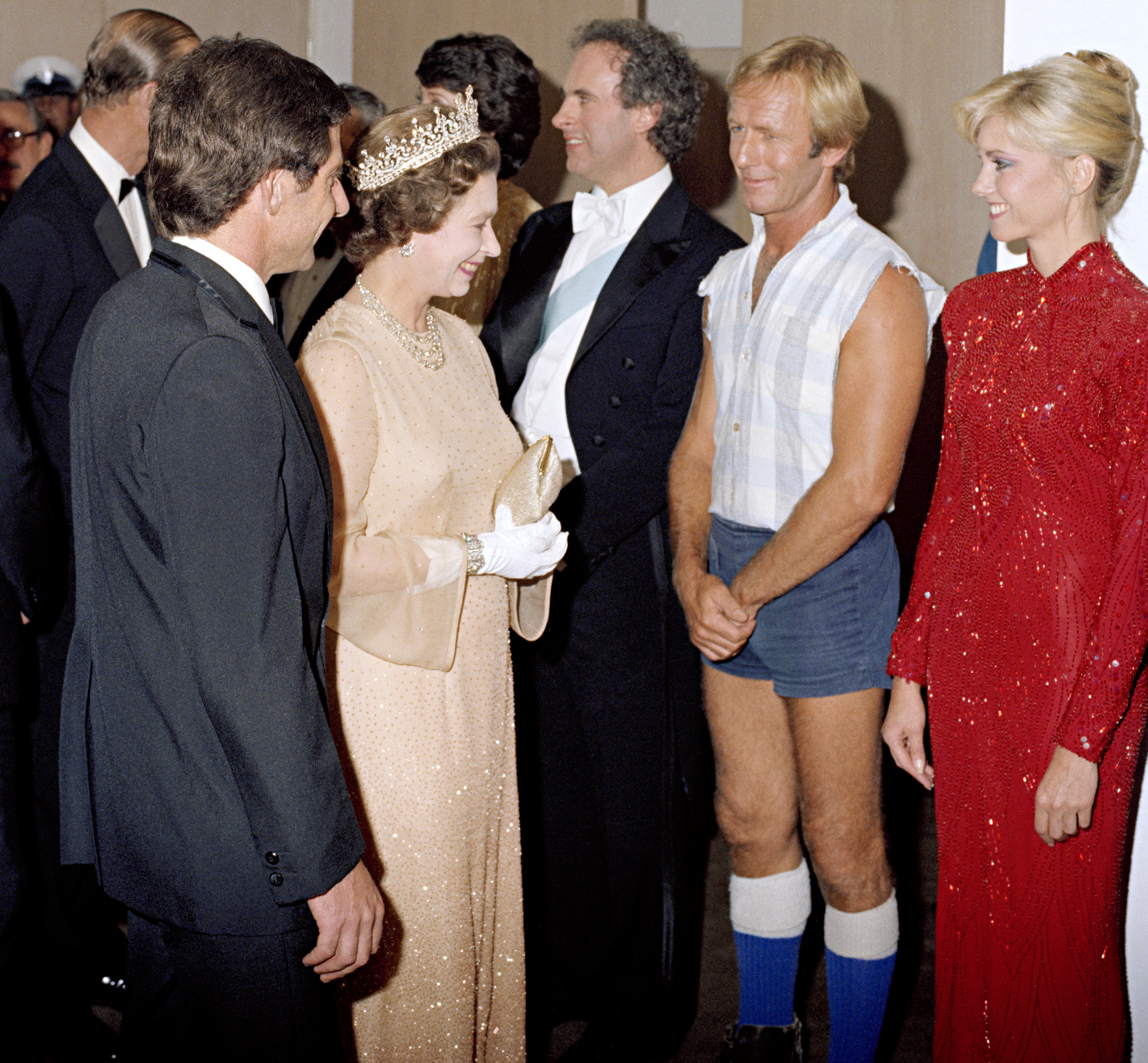
Newton-John meeting Queen Elizabeth II and Prince Philip at a Sydney concert in 1980; with her there are also Roger Woodward and Paul Hogan (in shorts)

Newton-John began 1980 by releasing "I Can't Help It" (No. 12 Pop, No. 8 AC), a duet with Andy Gibb from his After Dark album, and by starring in her third television special, Hollywood Nights. Later that year, she appeared in her first film since Grease when she starred with Gene Kelly and Michael Beck in the musical fantasy Xanadu. Although the film was a critical failure, its soundtrack (No. 4 Pop) was certified double platinum and scored five top 20 singles on the Billboard Hot 100. Newton-John charted with "Magic" (No. 1 Pop, No. 1 AC), "Suddenly" with Cliff Richard (No. 20 Pop, No. 4 AC) and the title song "Xanadu" with the Electric Light Orchestra (No. 8 Pop, No. 2 AC). [ELO also charted with "I'm Alive" (No. 16 Pop, No. 48 AC) and "All Over the World" (No. 13 Pop, No. 46 AC).]

"Magic" was Newton-John's biggest pop hit to that point (four weeks at No. 1) and still ranks as the biggest AC hit of her career (five weeks at No. 1). The film Xanadu has since become a cult classic and the basis for a Broadway show that ran for more than 500 performances beginning in 2007 and was nominated for four Tony Awards, including Best Musical.

In 1981, Newton-John released her most successful studio album, the double platinum Physical, which strongly reinforced her image change by showcasing risqué, rock-oriented material. Newton-John explained: "I just wasn't in the mood for tender ballads. I wanted peppy stuff because that's how I'm feeling." Of the title cut, Newton-John said: "Roger Davies was my manager at the time; he played it for me and I knew it was a very catchy song." The title track, written by Steve Kipner and Terry Shaddick, spent ten weeks atop the Billboard Hot 100. This matched the record at that time held by Debby Boone's "You Light Up My Life" for most weeks spent at No. 1 on the Hot 100. The single was certified platinum, and it ultimately ranked as the biggest song of the decade. (In 2008, Billboard ranked the song No. 6 among all songs that charted in the 50-year history of the Hot 100.)

"Physical" earned Newton-John her only placement ever on the R&B Singles (No. 28) and Albums (No. 32) charts. The Physical album spawned two more singles, "Make a Move on Me" (No. 5 Pop, No. 6 AC) and "Landslide" (No. 52 Pop).

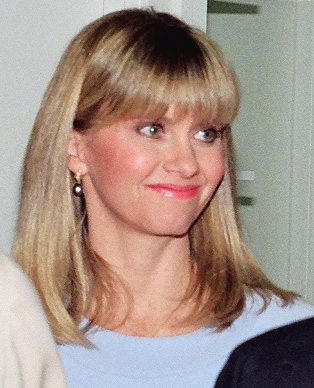
Newton-John at the opening of a Koala Blue store in 1988

The provocative lyrics of the "Physical" title track prompted two Utah radio stations to ban the single from their playlists. (In 2010, Billboard magazine ranked this as the most popular single ever about sex.) To counter its overtly suggestive tone, Newton-John filmed an exercise-themed video that turned the song into an aerobics anthem and made headbands a fashion accessory outside the gym.

She helped pioneer the music video industry by recording a video album for Physical, featuring videos of all the album's tracks and three of her older hits. The video album earned her a fourth Grammy and was aired as an ABC prime-time special, Let's Get Physical, becoming a top-10 Nielsen hit. Newton-John asserted: "Like everyone, I've got different sides of my personality. I've my dominant self, my need-to-be-dominated self, the sane Olivia and the crazy Olivia. Playing these different characters gave me a chance to show strange parts people haven't seen much."

The success of Physical led to an international tour and the release of her second hits collection, the double-platinum Olivia's Greatest Hits Vol. 2 (No. 16 Pop), which yielded two more top-40 singles: "Heart Attack" (No. 3 Pop) and "Tied Up" (No. 38 Pop). The tour was filmed for her Olivia in Concert television special, which premiered on HBO in January 1983. The special was subsequently released to video, earning Newton-John another Grammy nomination.

Newton-John reteamed with Travolta in 1983 for the critically and commercially unsuccessful movie Two of a Kind, redeemed by its platinum soundtrack (No. 26 Pop) featuring "Twist of Fate" (No. 5 Pop), "Livin' in Desperate Times" (No. 31 Pop), and a new duet with Travolta, "Take a Chance" (No. 3 AC). Newton-John released another video package, the Grammy-nominated Twist of Fate, featuring videos of her four songs on the Two of a Kind soundtrack and the two new singles from Olivia's Greatest Hits Vol. 2.

That same year Newton-John and Pat Farrar (formerly Pat Carroll) founded Koala Blue. The store, originally for Australian imports, evolved into a chain of women's clothing boutiques. The chain was initially successful, but it eventually declared bankruptcy and closed in 1992. Newton-John and Farrar were the targets of a multimillion-dollar lawsuit when Koala Blue franchise holders alleged breach of contract and unfair competition; agreeing with a motion citing insufficient evidence, a judge dismissed the case on summary judgement in 1993. Newton-John and Farrar later licensed the brand name for a line of Australian wines.

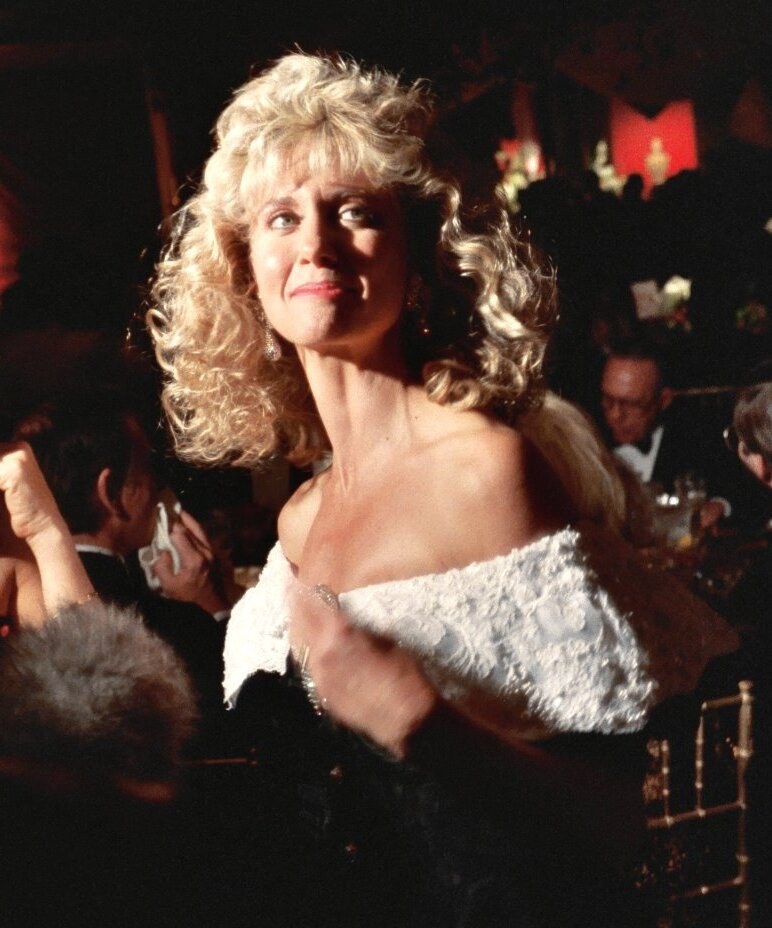
Newton-John at the 1989 Academy Awards

Newton-John, a supporter of Australian rules football Carlton, performed the Australian national anthem at the 1986 VFL Grand Final between Carlton and Hawthorn.

Newton-John's music career cooled again with the release of her next studio album, the gold Soul Kiss (No. 29 Pop), in 1985. The album's only charted single was the title track (No. 20 Pop, No. 20 AC). The video album for Soul Kiss featured only five of the album's ten tracks (concept videos for the album's singles "Soul Kiss" and "Toughen Up" as well as performance videos of the tracks "Culture Shock", "Emotional Tangle" and "The Right Moment").

After a nearly three-year hiatus following the birth of her daughter Chloe in January 1986, Newton-John resumed her recording career with the 1988 album The Rumour. The album was promoted by an HBO special, Olivia Down Under. Its first single, the title track, was written and produced by Elton John. Both the single (No. 62 Pop, No. 33 AC) and the album (No. 67 Pop) faltered commercially as the nearly 40-year-old Newton-John seemed "old" when compared with the teen queens Debbie Gibson and Tiffany ruling the pop charts at that time. (The album was praised by critics as more mature, with Newton-John addressing topics such as AIDS ("Love and Let Live"), the environment and single-parent households.)

The second single, "Can't We Talk It Over in Bed", did not chart, but was released in 1989 by Grayson Hugh, the song's arranger, and became a top-20 pop hit as "Talk It Over".

=== 1989–1998: Motherhood, cancer, and advocacy ===
In September 1989, Newton-John released her self-described "self-indulgent" album, Warm and Tender, which reunited her with producer John Farrar, absent from her previous LP, and also marked a return to a more wholesome image. Inspired by her daughter, who appeared on the cover, the album featured lullabies and love songs for parents and their children. This album, the last one solely produced by Farrar, also failed to revive her recording career, as the disc reached only No. 124 Pop.

She was appointed a Goodwill ambassador to the United Nations Environment Programme.

Newton-John's television work included starring in two Christmas films, A Mom for Christmas (1990) and A Christmas Romance (1994) – both top 10 Nielsen hits.

Newton-John was primed for another comeback in 1992 when she compiled her third hits collection, Back to Basics: The Essential Collection 1971–1992, and planned her first tour since her Physical trek ten years earlier. Shortly after the album's release, Newton-John was diagnosed with breast cancer, forcing her to cancel all publicity for the album, including the tour. She received her diagnosis the same weekend her father died.

Newton-John recovered. In 1991, she became the National Spokesperson for the Colette Chuda Environmental Fund/CHEC (Children's Health Environmental Coalition) following the death from Wilms' tumour of five-year-old Colette Chuda, daughter of Newton-John's friend Nancy Chuda. Later, Newton-John became an advocate for breast cancer research and other health issues. She was a product spokesperson for the Liv-Kit, a breast self-examination product, and also founded her own cancer centre in her home town in Australia.

Newton-John's cancer diagnosis also affected the type of music she recorded. In 1994, she released Gaia: One Woman's Journey, which chronicled her ordeal. Co-produced by Newton-John for ONJ Productions, Gaia was originally issued by Festival in Australia but also distributed by various independent labels in Japan and Europe. In 2002, there was an American distribution by Hip-O Records, and a subsequent re-release in 2012 by Green Hill featured an alternative cover photo. Gaia was the first album on which Newton-John wrote all the music and lyrics herself, and this endeavour encouraged her to become more active as a songwriter thereafter. The single "No Matter What You Do" entered the Australian top 40, and the second single, the environmentally themed "Don't Cut Me Down", was also used in the film It's My Party, a 1996 AIDS drama. The Latin-fuelled "Not Gonna Give into It" eventually became heavily showcased in concert performance; "The Way of Love" was featured in the telefilm A Christmas Romance, and "Trust Yourself" was incorporated into both the TV movie The Wilde Girls and the theatrical film Sordid Lives.

Newton-John was listed as president of the Isle of Man Basking shark Society between 1998 and 2005.

=== 1998–2012: Later releases ===
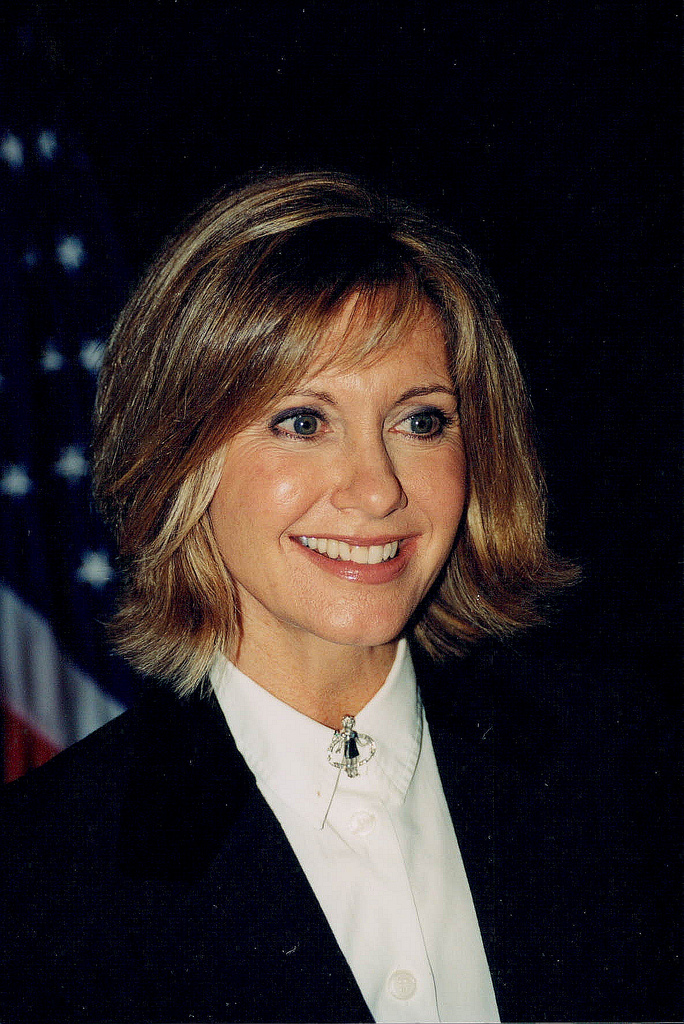
Newton-John at the National Press Club in Washington, D.C., 2001

Newton-John continued to record and perform pop-oriented music as well. In 1998, she returned to Nashville to record Back with a Heart (No. 59 Pop). The album returned her to the top 10 (No. 9) on the Country Albums chart. Its first single was a re-recording of "I Honestly Love You" produced by David Foster and featuring Kenneth "Babyface" Edmonds on background vocals that charted on the Pop (No. 67) and AC (No. 18) charts. Country radio dismissed the song, though it did peak at No. 16 on the Country Sales chart. The album track, "Love Is a Gift", won Newton-John a 1999 Daytime Emmy Award for Outstanding Original Song after being featured on the daytime serial, As the World Turns.

During October–December 1998, Newton-John, John Farnham and Anthony Warlow performed in The Main Event Tour. The album Highlights from The Main Event peaked at No. 1 in December, was certified 4× platinum, won an ARIA Award for Highest Selling Australian CD at the 1999 Awards and was also nominated for Best Adult Contemporary Album. For the 2000 Summer Olympics, Newton-John and Farnham re-teamed to perform "Dare to Dream" during the Parade of Nations at the Opening Ceremony. Broadcast of the ceremony was viewed by an estimated 3.5 billion people around the world.

In December 1998, following a hiatus of about 16 years, Newton-John also resumed touring by herself and in 2000 released a solo CD, One Woman's Live Journey, her first live album since 1981's Love Performance.

Newton-John appeared in the 2000 Del Shores film Sordid Lives as Bitsy Mae Harling, a bisexual former-convict country singer. She reprised the role for the Sordid Lives television series, which aired one season on the LOGO television network in 2008. The series featured five original songs written and composed by Newton-John specifically for the show.

In 2000, she teamed with Vince Gill and the London Symphony Orchestra for 'Tis the Season sold exclusively through Hallmark. The following year, she released The Christmas Collection, which compiled seasonal music previously recorded for her Hallmark Christmas album, her appearance on Kenny Loggins' 1999 TNN Christmas special, and her contributions to the multi-artist collections Mother and Child and Spirit of Christmas.

Newton-John's subsequent albums were released primarily in Australia. In 2002, she released (2), a duets album featuring mostly Australian artists (Tina Arena, Darren Hayes, Jimmy Little, Johnny O'Keefe, Billy Thorpe and Keith Urban), as well as a "duet" with the deceased Peter Allen. In addition, (2) offered a hidden 12th track, a samba version of "Physical" which Newton-John later performed occasionally in concert instead of the more rock-style original. The album's 2004 Japanese release includes the bonus track "Let It Be Me", a duet with Cliff Richard with whom she had previously been coupled on "Suddenly" and Songs from Heathcliff.

Newton-John was inducted into Australia's ARIA Hall of Fame in 2002.

Produced by Phil Ramone and recorded at the Indigo Recording Studios in Malibu for ONJ Productions, Indigo: Women of Song was released in October 2004 in Australia. The tribute album featured Newton-John covering songs by artists such as Joan Baez, the Carpenters, Doris Day, Nina Simone and Minnie Riperton. She dedicated the album to her mother, who had died the previous year of breast cancer. Indigo was subsequently released in the UK in April 2005 and in Japan in March 2006. A rebranded and resequenced version called Portraits: A Tribute to Great Women of Song was eventually issued in the United States in 2011.

In 2005, she released Stronger Than Before, sold exclusively in the United States by Hallmark. This was her second exclusive album for Hallmark Cards after her successful first Christmas album Tis the Season with Vince Gill five years earlier. Proceeds from the album's sales benefited breast cancer research. The album featured the song "Phenomenal Woman," based on the poem by Maya Angelou, and guest vocals from Diahann Carroll, Beth Nielsen Chapman, Delta Goodrem, Amy Holland, Patti LaBelle and Mindy Smith—all survivors of or affected by cancer.

In 2006, Newton-John released a healing CD, Grace and Gratitude. The album was sold exclusively by Walgreens, also to benefit various charities including Y-ME National Breast Cancer Organization. The CD was the "heart" of their Body – Heart – Spirit Wellness Collection, which also featured a re-branded Liv-Kit and breast-health dietary supplements.

In 2007, she re-teamed with her Grace and Gratitude producer, Amy Sky, for Christmas Wish (No. 187 Pop) which was sold exclusively by Target in its first year of release. Newton-John released another concert DVD, Olivia Newton-John and the Sydney Symphony: Live at the Sydney Opera House and a companion CD, her third live album titled Olivia's Live Hits.

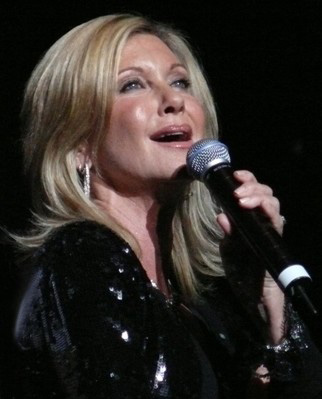
Newton-John, performing at the Sydney State Theatre in September 2008

In 2008, she raised funds to help build the Olivia Newton-John Cancer and Wellness Centre in Melbourne, Australia. She led a three-week, 228 km walk along the Great Wall of China during April, joined by various celebrities and cancer survivors throughout her trek. She released a companion CD, A Celebration in Song, the following month in Australia and later worldwide, featuring new and previously recorded duets by "Olivia Newton-John & Friends", including Jann Arden, Jimmy Barnes, John Farrar, Barry Gibb, Delta Goodrem, Sun Ho, Richard Marx, Cliff Richard, Melinda Schneider, Amy Sky, and Keith Urban.

In 2008, Newton-John took part in the BBC Wales program Coming Home about her Welsh family history. Also, in 2008, Newton-John joined Anne Murray on Murray's last album, titled Duets: Friends & Legends. She sang Gordon Lightfoot's hit "Cotton Jenny" with Murray.

She re-recorded some tracks from Grace and Gratitude in 2010 and re-released the album as Grace and Gratitude Renewed on the Green Hill music label. The Renewed CD includes a new track, "Help Me to Heal", not featured on the original album.

Newton-John was featured in UniGlobe Entertainment's breast cancer docu-drama, 1 a Minute, released in October 2010. The documentary was made by actress Namrata Singh Gujral and featured other celebrities who had survived breast cancer or who were affected by the disease. During the same month, Bluewater Productions released a comic book featuring Newton-John to coincide with Breast Cancer Awareness Month.

In 2010, Newton-John starred in the film Score: A Hockey Musical, released in Canada. She portrayed Hope Gordon, the mother of a home-schooled hockey prodigy. The film opened the 2010 Toronto International Film Festival.

Newton-John guest-starred as herself in the sitcoms Ned and Stacey, Murphy Brown and Bette and also made two appearances as herself on Glee.

For her first Glee appearance, Newton-John recreated her "Physical" video with series regular Jane Lynch. The performance was released as a digital single which peaked at number 89 on the Billboard Hot 100 in May 2010. In Australia, Newton-John hosted the animal and nature series Wild Life and guest-starred as Joanna on two episodes of the Australian series The Man From Snowy River.

In January 2011, Newton-John began filming the comedy A Few Best Men in Australia with director Stephan Elliott, in the role of mother of the bride. The groom is played by Xavier Samuel.

=== 2012–2022: Vegas residency and final releases ===
Newton-John was actively touring and doing concerts from 2012 to 2017 and also performed a handful of shows in 2018. Her dates for A Summer Night with Olivia Newton-John even included stops in Asia and Canada and culminated in a rare concert appearance in London in 2013. Her March 2013 UK trek also encompassed Bournemouth, Brighton, Birmingham, Manchester and Cardiff, Wales.

In November 2012, Newton-John teamed with John Travolta to make the charity album This Christmas, in support of The Olivia Newton-John Cancer & Wellness Centre and the Jett Travolta Foundation. Artists featured on the album include: Barbra Streisand, James Taylor, Chick Corea, Kenny G, Tony Bennett, Cliff Richard and the Count Basie Orchestra.

A 2013 residency at the Flamingo Las Vegas was postponed due to the May 2013 death of her elder sister, Rona (aged 72), from a brain tumour. Newton-John resumed performing, doing 45 shows beginning in April 2014. Along with the Vegas shows, Newton-John released a new EP in April 2014 entitled Hotel Sessions, which consisted of seven tracks of unreleased demos that were recorded between 2002 and 2011 with her nephew Brett Goldsmith. The CD contains a cover of "Broken Wings" as well as the popular-with-fans original "Best of My Love", which had leaked on the internet many years prior.

Her Vegas stay was eventually extended beyond August 2014, and her Summer Nights residency finished in December 2016 after 175 shows. Her successful three-year run even prompted a fourth live album, Summer Nights: Live in Las Vegas (2015). In 2015, Newton-John also reunited with John Farnham for a joint venture called Two Strong Hearts Live.

In 2015, Newton-John was a guest judge on an episode of RuPaul's Drag Race. That same year, she scored her first number-one single on Billboard's Dance Club Songs chart with "You Have to Believe" with daughter Chloe and producer Dave Audé. The song was a re-imagining of her 1980 single "Magic", which she noted was to celebrate both the 35th anniversary of Xanadu and as a dedication to her daughter. About the latter, Newton-John stated: "I met Chloe's dad on the set of Xanadu; so, without that film, Chloe wouldn't be here. She was the real 'magic' that came out of that film!" The song became the first mother-daughter single to reach No. 1 on the Billboard Dance Club Play chart.

In 2015, Newton-John was inducted into the Music Victoria Hall of Fame.

In 2017, she collaborated with two North American singer-songwriters, Beth Nielsen Chapman and Amy Sky, on a joint concert tour entitled Liv On after co-producing a 2016 CD by the same name.

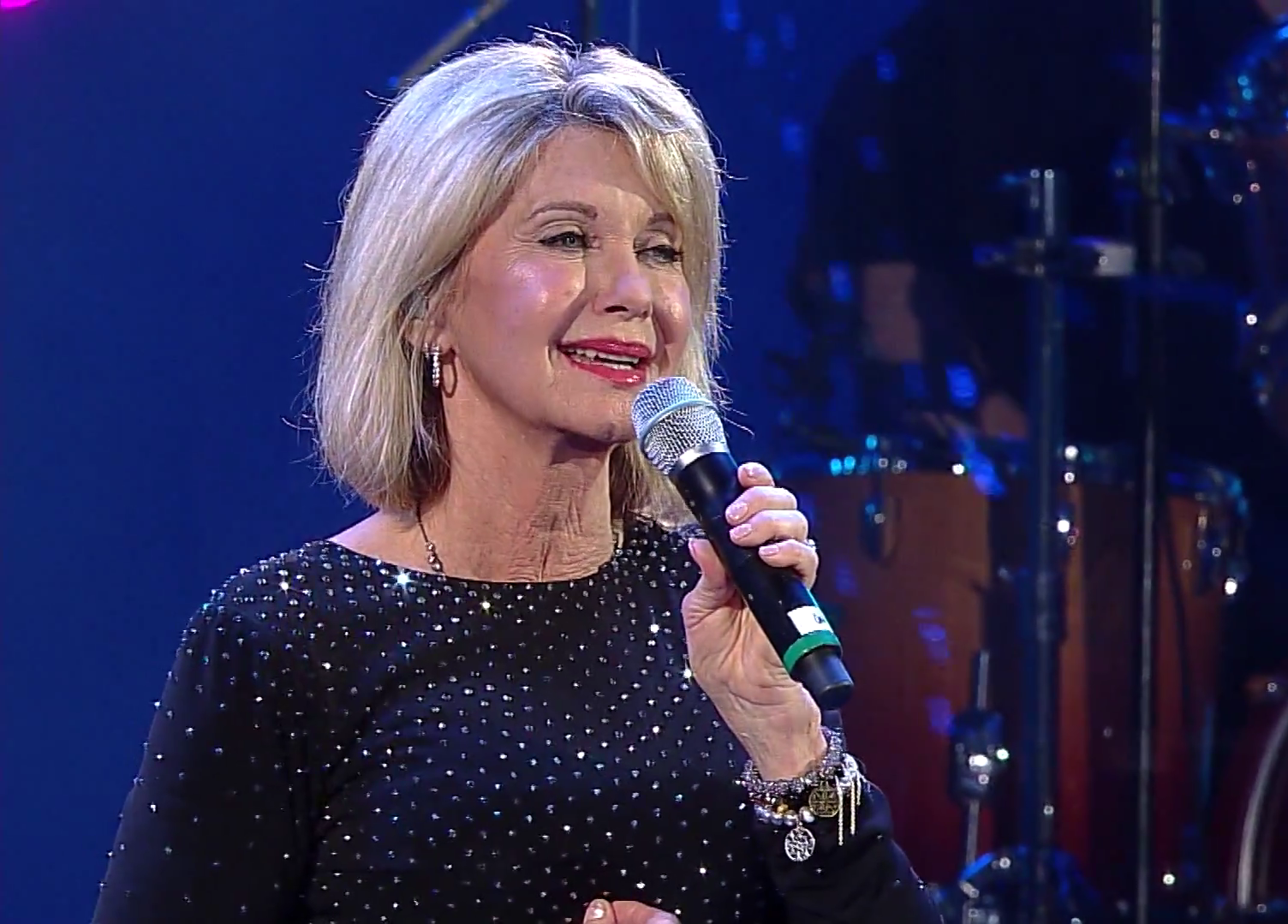
Newton-John performing at Viña 2017

On 7 May 2019, Newton-John's elder brother Hugh, a doctor, died at age 80; his death left Newton-John as the sole surviving sibling from the original family.

In recognition for "her work as an entertainer and philanthropist", she was bestowed Australia's highest honour, the Companion of the Order of Australia, in June 2019.

In December 2019, Newton-John and Travolta also re-teamed for three live Meet 'n' Grease sing-along events in the Florida cities of Tampa, West Palm Beach and Jacksonville. Subsequently, a sing-along re-broadcast of Grease aired on CBS Television.

In February 2020, Newton-John appeared at the Fire Fight Australia charity event. This was her final public performance.

In January 2021, Newton-John released her single, "Window in the Wall", a duet about unity which she recorded with her daughter Chloe Lattanzi. The music video for the song peaked at No. 1 on the iTunes pop music video chart the week of its release.

In February 2022, Newton-John's final studio recording was a duet version of "Jolene," recorded with Dolly Parton just months before Olivia's death in August 2022. There is a music video featuring the two of them. The song is featured on her posthumous duets album "Just the Two of Us: The Duets Collection, Volume 1."

== In the media ==
On 2 November 2019, Julien's Auctions auctioned hundreds of memorabilia items from Newton-John's career. The sale raised $2.4 million. Newton-John's Grease outfit garnered $405,700; her pants and jacket were purchased separately by two different billionaires. Sara Blakely, founder of Spanx, bought Newton-John's black skintight pants from Grease for $162,000. The anonymous buyer who acquired her famous Grease leather jacket for $243,200 (£185,000) returned the item to her and said: "It should not sit in a billionaire's closet for country-club bragging rights [...] The odds of beating a recurring cancer using the newest emerging therapies is a thousandfold greater than someone appearing out of the blue, buying your most famous and cherished icon, and returning it to you." All proceeds were donated to her Cancer Wellness and Research Centre in Australia.

In December 2024 and January 2025, Julien's and TCM also held posthumous sales of Newton-John commemoratives.

== Musical legacy ==
Newton-John's first boyfriend, Ian Turpie, once said of her early appearances: "In those days she had a small voice, but it was very pure. She could sing prettily in tune....The improvement in her singing since she went to England has been remarkable. She told me Shirley Bassey has been a big influence on her. After hearing Bassey, she worked at developing her head voice to sound like a chest voice, the way Bassey uses hers. The power she's developed is amazing".

Michael Dwyer of the Sydney Morning Herald maintains that following Newton-John's career was like watching "our slightly older and braver sister growing up in public" and her death "feels today like a lost member of the family". Rachel Syme of The New Yorker also suggests that her familial, down-to-earth demeanor and humanity may have even superseded her singing accomplishments: "Her most lasting legacy might be as the rare celebrity who was almost universally well liked, and thought of as an essentially kind and warmhearted person".

Her musical abilities on their own merits were also impressive. In her 1982 Olivia in Concert performance of Dolly Parton's "Jolene," Newton-John showcases a down-falling note range covering three octaves. (Much later, Newton-John and Parton recorded a duet of "Jolene," which was not formally released until after Newton-John's death.) In her memoir, Newton-John describes herself as "not a power singer but more of an interpretive one"; and author Lauren O'Neill concurs: "She sang with clarity and precision, her high notes bright and open like a window on a summer morning, but her voice was never clinical – a sultry purr, euphoric cry or breathy gasp seemed always available to her....Her vocal [on "Hopelessly Devoted to You" from Grease] is clean and soaring, but to hear it is to be right down in the dirt with Sandy too; to feel, and perhaps even identify with, her total frustration with herself. As she slides between notes while singing 'I'm out of my head,' she shows us her emotional freefall as well as telling us about it."

Long before and after the career summit of Grease, Newton-John proved herself to be a fairly versatile performer, lending her instrument to everything from sentimental ballads and New Age soul searching to lively dance productions and rock & soul fervor. Maura Johnston of Vulture assesses: "Newton-John was a regular chart-topper...throughout the '70s, her lithe soprano adapting well to the soft pop sound" of the era with "AM Gold staples and tracks from the folk and country world...As it turned out, Newton-John's voice was pretty well suited to the spiky dance pop that would become popular in the early 1980s" too. However, Stephen Thomas Erlewine of the Los Angeles Times offers a counterpoint on her career decline in the mid-1980s: "Hardness never was Newton-John's comfort zone, though, and the 1980s were a much harder decade than the 1970s. The inherent warmth of 1970s studio sessions gave way to the cold, synthesized gleam of the 1980s, a sterile sound that suited her well only once: the candied faux-new wave of 'Twist of Fate'", produced by David Foster. Johnston further maintains: "Her pop heyday transcended any attempts to musically pigeonhole her"; and by the time she stopped having many new hits, "her musical legacy ... had been pretty well solidified."

Newton-John's work has inspired many other female vocalists, including Juliana Hatfield, Lisa Loeb, Kylie Minogue, Delta Goodrem, Natalie Maines and Alanis Morissette. Pink staged a commemorative Newton-John cover during the 2022 American Music Awards. At the 2022 ARIA Music Awards, a special tribute in her honour featured performances by Natalie Imbruglia, Peking Duk and Tones and I.

== Personal life ==
=== Relationships ===
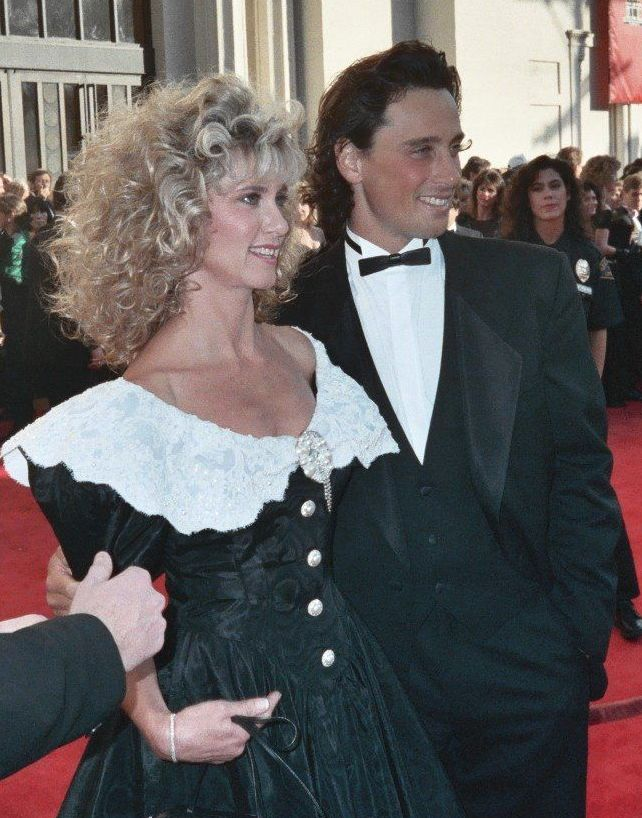
Newton-John with her first husband Matt Lattanzi at the 61st Academy Awards in 1989

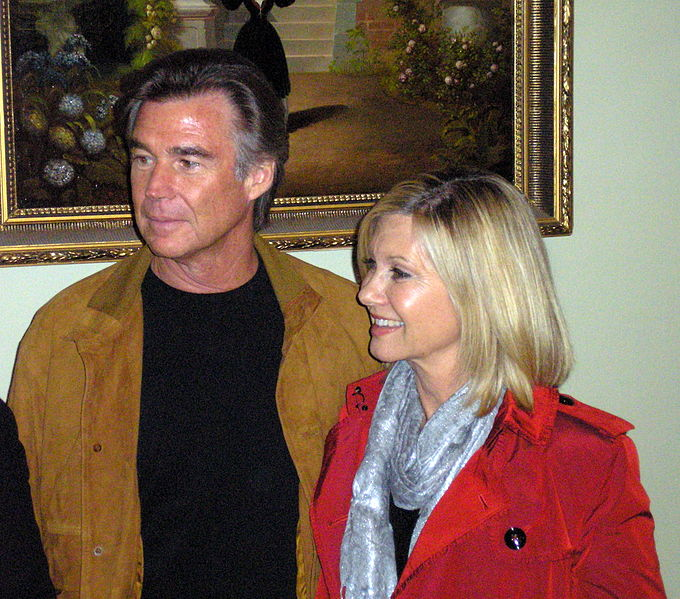
Newton-John with her second husband John Easterling in 2010

In the mid-1960s, Newton-John dated Australian actor and singer Ian Turpie, her co-star in the 1965 musical film Funny Things Happen Down Under. They met in 1963 when Turpie attended the coffee shop where Newton-John's group Sol Four performed. The relationship continued until she returned to England in 1966.

In 1968, Newton-John was engaged to but never married Bruce Welch, one of her early producers and co-writer of her hit "Please Mr. Please". In 1972, Newton-John ended her relationship with Welch, who subsequently attempted suicide.

In 1973, while vacationing on the French Riviera, Newton-John met British businessman Lee Kramer, who became both her new boyfriend and manager. Newton-John lived with Kramer on and off and they stayed a couple until 1979; she called their turbulent pairing "one long breakup". Kramer subsequently returned to England and married. He also managed vocalist Krishna Das. Kramer died in 2017.

Newton-John married her long-time, live-in partner, actor Matt Lattanzi, in December 1984. The pair had met in 1980 while filming Xanadu. They announced their separation in April 1995, and they divorced in 1996. The couple remained friends. Their daughter, Chloe Rose, was born in January 1986.

Newton-John met gaffer/cameraman Patrick McDermott soon after her divorce from Lattanzi. They dated on and off for nine years. McDermott vanished during a 2005 fishing trip off the Californian coast. Newton-John was in Australia at her Gaia Retreat & Spa at the time of McDermott's disappearance. A United States Coast Guard investigation, based on then-available evidence and released in 2008, pointed to McDermott having been lost at sea. Various unsubstantiated claims have been made that he faked his own death.

In 1993, Newton-John met John Easterling, founder and president of the Amazon Herb Company, which he started in 1990 and sold to TriVita in 2012. Also known as "Amazon John", Easterling initially marketed rainforest botanicals and later owned Happy Tree Microbes, which offered natural plant performance products. When Newton-John and Easterling first met, they were both married to other people. In 2007, they started dating and married in an Incan spiritual ceremony in Peru on 21 June 2008, followed by a legal ceremony nine days later (30 June 2008) on Jupiter Island, Florida.

=== Residences and citizenship ===
Although principally raised in Australia, Newton-John remained a British subject throughout her childhood. She initially pursued Australian citizenship in 1981 with an application that Prime Minister Malcolm Fraser was asked to expedite. However, she finally became an Australian citizen in 1994.

After relocating from England to the United States in late 1974, Newton-John set up residence in Malibu, California, where for 35 years she owned various real estate, including a horse ranch and several beachfront properties.

In June 2009, Newton-John and her second husband, John Easterling, purchased a new $4.1 million home in Jupiter Inlet, Florida. In 2013, while renovations were being done on the property and the couple was not there, a contractor committed suicide on the estate, which at the time was up for sale. Following the death on the premises, Newton-John and Easterling bought a nearby condo; their larger home lingered on and off the market for two years but was eventually sold in 2015 to a Swedish advertising executive for $5 million.

In 2015, the couple purchased a $5.3 million, 12-acre horse ranch in the Santa Ynez Valley outside Santa Barbara. Easterling sold the estate, known as Indian Way, in early 2025 for $7.9 million.

In 2019, Newton-John sold her 187-acre Australian farm, near Byron Bay in New South Wales, which she had owned for nearly 40 years. The Dalwood estate sold for $4.6 million; in 1980, Newton-John had paid $622,000 for the property, which had additional land adjoined in both 1983 and in 2002.

Newton-John was also partial owner of Byron Bay's Gaia Retreat & Spa, which was founded in 2005 and sold in 2021 for $30 million to the investment firm of Tattarang.

When asked in 2017 whether she considered herself to be a British, Australian, or American citizen, she said, "I am still Australian." In December 2019, upon being given the title of Dame, she expressed her thanks by stating: "As a girl born in Cambridge [England], I am very proud of my British ancestry and so appreciative to be recognised in this way by the United Kingdom."

== Illness and death ==
In May 2017, it was announced that Newton-John's breast cancer had returned and metastasised to her lower back. Her back pains had initially been diagnosed as sciatica. She subsequently revealed this was actually her third bout with breast cancer, as she had experienced a recurrence of the disease in 2013 in addition to her initial 1992 diagnosis. With the 2017 recurrence, the cancer had spread to her bones and progressed to stage IV. Newton-John experienced significant pain from the metastatic bone lesions and had spoken of using cannabis oil to ease her pain. She was an advocate for the use of medical cannabis; her daughter Chloe owns a cannabis farm in Oregon.

Newton-John died on 8 August 2022, at the age of 73, at her home in the Santa Ynez Valley of California. Tributes were paid by John Travolta, Barbra Streisand, Australian Prime Minister Anthony Albanese and many other celebrities. As a mark of respect, Melbourne and Sydney lit up many of their landmarks.

In September 2022, Newton-John's family held a "small and very private" memorial service in California for the singer, who asked to be cremated and have her ashes scattered in Byron Bay, on her Santa Ynez ranch, and "in other places that I love".

The State of Victoria offered Newton-John's family a state funeral, which her niece Tottie Goldsmith accepted. Newton-John's Australian memorial service, hosted by David Campbell, was held on 26 February 2023, at Hamer Hall in Melbourne and included eulogies from her widower and daughter; a testimonial to her strength of character, optimism and magnanimity by television personality Richard Wilkins; montages of her career, family life and wellness centre; a medley of her hits performed by Delta Goodrem, and pre-recorded video tributes from Elton John, Mariah Carey, Barry Gibb, Dolly Parton and Nicole Kidman.

== Discography ==
- If Not for You (1971)
- Olivia (1972)
- Let Me Be There (1973)
- If You Love Me, Let Me Know (1974)
- Long Live Love (1974)
- Have You Never Been Mellow (1975)
- Clearly Love (1975)
- Come on Over (1976)
- Don't Stop Believin' (1976)
- Making a Good Thing Better (1977)
- Totally Hot (1978)
- Physical (1981)
- Soul Kiss (1985)
- The Rumour (1988)
- Warm and Tender (1989)
- Gaia: One Woman's Journey (1994)
- Back with a Heart (1998)
- 'Tis the Season (2000) (with Vince Gill)
- (2) (2002)
- Indigo: Women of Song (2004)
- Stronger Than Before (2005)
- Grace and Gratitude (2006)
- Christmas Wish (2007)
- A Celebration in Song (2008)
- This Christmas (2012) (with John Travolta)
- Liv On (2016) (with Amy Sky and Beth Nielsen Chapman)
- Friends for Christmas (2016) (with John Farnham)

== Filmography ==
Year	Title	Role	Notes
1965	Funny Things Happen Down Under	Olivia	
1970	Toomorrow	Olivia	
1972	The Case	Olivia	Television film
1978	Grease	Sandy Olsson	
1980	Xanadu	Kira	
1983	Two of a Kind	Debbie Wylder	
1988	She's Having a Baby	Herself	Uncredited
1990	A Mom for Christmas	Amy Miller	Television film
1991	Madonna: Truth or Dare	Herself	Documentary
1994	A Christmas Romance	Julia Stonecypher	Television film
1996	It's My Party	Lina Bingham	
2000	Sordid Lives	Bitsy Mae Harling	
2001	The Wilde Girls	Jasmine Wilde	Television film
2010	1 a Minute	Herself	
2010	Score: A Hockey Musical	Hope Gordon	
2011	A Few Best Men	Barbara Ramme	
2017	Sharknado 5: Global Swarming	Orion	Television film
2020	The Very Excellent Mr. Dundee	Olivia	

== Television ==
Year	Title	Performance	Notes
1963	New Faces	Herself – Contestant	TV series Australia, 1 episode
1963	The Kevin Dennis Auditions	Herself	TV series Australia, 1 episode
1964	Teen Scene	Herself	TV series Australia, 1 episode
1964	The Kevin Dennis Show	Herself	TV series Australia, 1 episode
1964	Teentime Ten	Herself	TV series Australia, 1 episode
1964, 1965	Sing, Sing, Sing	Herself sings "Everything's Coming Up Roses" from 'Gypsy'	TV series Australia, 2 episodes
1964–1965	The Happy Show	Herself – Co-host: Lovely Livvy	TV series Australia
1965	Sunnyside Up	Herself	TV series Australia, 1 episode
1965	Boomeride	Herself sings "When I Grow Up" / "Crawl Baby, Crawl"	TV series Australia, 9 episodes
1965	Kommotion	Herself	TV series, Australia
1965–1966	The Go!! Show	Herself	TV series Australia, 16 episodes
1965, 1966	Time for Terry	Herself	TV series, Australia
1966	Dick Emery Show	Herself	TV series UK, 2 episodes
1967	It's That Time	Herself	TV series Australia, 1 episode
1967	Pat and Olivia	Herself & Pat Carroll	TV special, Australia
1967	News Conference	Herself	TV series Australia, 1 episode
1967	The Young Entertainers	Herself	TV series Australia, 1 episode
1968	Bandstand	Herself sings "Here, There And Everywhere" / "Today I Can't Do Without You Today" with Pat Carroll	TV series Australia, 1 episode
1969	ABC News Report	Herself & Pat Carroll	TV series Australia, 1 episode
1970	The Cliff Richard Show	Herself	TV series UK, 1 episode
1971	Grand Amphi	Herself sings "Love Song"	TV series France, 1 episode
1971	The Golden Shot	Herself	TV series UK, 1 episode
1971	Big Lecture Hall	Herself	TV series UK, 1 episode
1971	One Rosu Wine	Herself	TV series UK, 1 episode
1971	Getaway with Cliff	Herself	TV special UK
1971	Lift Off with Ayshea	Herself	TV series UK, 1 episode
1971	GTK	Herself	TV series Australia, 1 episode
1971	15 Years of Channel Nine	Herself sings "If Not For You" / "Banks of the Ohio"	TV special Australia
1971, 1972	Disco	Herself sings "If Not for You" / "Banks of the Ohio"	TV series Germany, 2 episodes
1971, 1972	Top of the Pops	Herself sings "Banks Of The Ohio"	TV series UK, 1 episode
1972	Choeur en Fête	Herself sings "Love Song" / "Banks of the Ohio"	TV series France, 1 episode
1972	Top of the Pops	Herself sings "What Is Life"	TV series UK, 2 episodes
1972	The Case	Herself	BBC TV film with Cliff Richard & Tim Brooke-Taylor
1972	Sacha's in Town	Herself	TV series UK, 2 episodes
1972	Meerschweinchen Revue	Herself	TV series Germany, 1 episode
1972	Hits à Gogo	Herself	TV series Germany/Czech, 1 episode
1972	The Dean Martin Show	Herself sings "If" / "Just A Little Lovin'/ "True Love" with Dean Martin	TV series US, 1 episode
1972	The Harry Secombe Show	Herself sings "Take Me Home, Country Roads	TV series US, 1 episode
1972	The Reg Varney Christmas Revue	Herself sings "Take Me Home, Country Roads" / Cecilia/Side By Side/Carolina in The Morning/You Made Me Love You (in chorus)	TV special, UK
1973	Top of the Pops	Herself sings "Take Me Home, Country Roads"	TV series UK, 1 episode
1973	The Val Doonican Show	Herself	TV series UK, 1 episode
1973	Unsere kleine Show – Musik zur blauen Stunde	Herself	TV series Germany, 1 episode
1973	Engelbert	Herself sings "If We Only Have Love" with Engelbert Humperdinck	TV series UK, 1 episode
1973	Stephane Grapelli	Herself sings "Honey Pie"	TV series France, 1 episode
1973	Tokyo Music Song Festival	Herself sings "Maybe Then I'll Think Of You"	TV special, Japan
1973	The Young Generation	Herself	TV series UK, 1 episode
1973	Sez Les	Herself sings "And I Love You So" / "Let Me Be There"	TV series UK, 2 episodes
1973	George Hamilton IV and Other Folk	Herself	TV series UK, 1 episode
1973	Sez Les	Herself sings "Yesterday Once More" / "Let Me Be There"	TV series UK, 1 episode
1973	The New-Fangled Wandering Minstrel Show	Herself sings "If We Only Have Love" / "All I Ever Need Is You" / "Will You Still Love Me Tomorrow" (with Georgie Fame) / "Scarborough Fair" / "I Say Yeh Yeh" (with Georgie Fame)	TV special, UK
1973–1974	Moods of Love	Herself sings	TV special, UK
1974	Eddy Go Round	Herself sings "Long Live Love" / "I Love You, I Honestly Love You", "If You Love Me, Let Me Know"	TV series Netherlands, 1 episode
1974	Clunk Click: Songs for Eurovision	Herself sings "Have Love Will Travel" / "Loving You Ain't Easy" / "Long Live Love" / "Someday" / "Angel Eyes" / "Hands Across The Sea"	TV special, UK
1974	Eurovision Song Contest	Herself sings "Long Live Love"	United Kingdom Entry: 4th place
1975	John Denver's Rocky Mountain Christmas	Herself sings "Let It Shine" / "Fly Away" (duet with John Denver)	ABC TV special
1976	Countdown	Herself chats about Don't Stop Believin' album	ABC TV series, 1 episode, AUSTRALIA
1976	A Special Olivia Newton-John	Herself	ABC special-
1977	Only Olivia	Herself	BBC special
1977; 1996	This Is Your Life: Peter Allen	Herself with Peter Frampton sends a message to Peter from Los Angeles	TV series, 1 episode, AUSTRALIA
1978	Olivia	Herself	ABC special; guest stars ABBA and Andy Gibb)
1978	Australian Music to the World	Herself – Archive clips	TV special, AUSTRALIA
1978	Cliff Richard: Thanks for the Music Concert	Herself chats about Cliff	TV special, UNITED KINGDOM
1978; 1980	Parkinson	Herself – Guest with Gloria Swanson and Barry Humphries as Dame Edna Everage	TV series UK, 1 episode
1979	Countdown	Herself on set of the film Xanadu	TV series ABC, 1 episode, AUSTRALIA
1979	BBC News	Herself is given OBE award	TV series, 1 episode, UNITED KINGDOM
1980	Making Xanadu	Herself and cast	TV special, UNITED STATES
1980	Willesee at Seven	Herself chats about performer's union strike prior to Xanadu; Australian film release	TV series, 1 episode, AUSTRALIA
1980	Seven Nightly News	Herself on performer's union strike	TV series, 1 episode, AUSTRALIA
1980	Countdown Xanadu Dance Contest Show	Special guest – sings "Magic" / "Xanadu"	TV series, 1 episode, AUSTRALIA
1980	The Mike Walsh Show	Guest – Herself chats about career, music from 'Grease' and 'Xanadu'	TV series, 1 episode, AUSTRALIA
1980	Sounds: Olivia's 32nd Birthday	Herself – Archive clips: "Let Me Be There" / "Don't Stop Believin' / "Sam" / "Jolene" / "Hopelessly Devoted to You" / "You're the One That I Want" / "Magic" / "Xanadu" / "Don't Cry for Me Argentina	TV special, AUSTRALIA
1980	Hollywood Nights	Herself	ABC special
1980; 1981	The Don Lane Show	Guest – Herself	TV series, 1 episode, AUSTRALIA
1980; 2004	Parkinson	Herself – Guest	TV series UK, 1 episode
1981	Australian Music Stars of the 60s	Herself – Archive clips "Christmas Time Down Under" / "Banks of the Ohio"	TV special, AUSTRALIA
1981	The Don Lane Show	Guest – Herself at Malibu Ranch via satellite to Australia about Physical album and song	TV series, 1 episode, AUSTRALIA
1981; 1983	Countdown	Guest – Herself chats from home about Physical album and new single release "Make A Move On Me"	ABC TV series, 1 episode, AUSTRALIA
1982	Let's Get Physical	Herself	ABC special
1982	Saturday Night Live	Herself – Host	Also musical guest
1982	Olivia in Concert	Herself	HBO special
1982	Olivia	Herself	Australian TV special
1982	1982 TV Week Logie Awards	Special Guest and sings "Make A Move On Me'	TV special, AUSTRALIA
1983	Australian Music to the World	Herself – archive clips	TV special, AUSTRALIA
1983	Ten Eyewitness News	Herself at 'Phar Lap' film premiere	TV series, 1 episode, AUSTRALIA
1983; 1984	Countdown	Guest – Herself chats to Molly from home	ABC TV series, 1 episode, AUSTRALIA
1984	John Travolta & Olivia Newton-John – Two of a Kind	Introduced by Ian Turpie, herself and Travolta on set film Two of a Kind; music clips include "Twist of Fate" / "Take a Chance" / "(Livin' In) Desperate Times" / "Shaking You". Scenes from films Staying Alive and Grease are also featured, among them a clip featuring "You're the One That I Want"	TV special, UNITED STATES/AUSTRALIA
1984	Olympic Gala	Introduced by Paul Hogan; guest performer sings "Waltzing Matilda" / "I Still Call Australia Home"	TV special, AUSTRALIA/UNITED STATES
1984	Tonight With Bert Newton	Guest – Herself with Pat Farrar	TV series, 1 episode
1984; 1985	Countdown	Guest – Herself chats to Molly at Koala Blue store	ABC TV series, 1 episode
1985	Olivia Newton-John: Soul Kiss	Herself chats about Soul Kiss songs from album music video clips include "Soul Kiss"/ "Toughen Up" / "Culture Shock" / "Emotional Tangle" / "The Right Moment"	TV special, UNITED STATES
1985	Countdown	Guest – Herself chats from the Koala Blue store	TV series, 1 episode, AUSTRALIA
1986	VFL Football Grand Final	Guest performer sings "Australian National Anthem"	TV special
1988	Australia Live: Gift to a Nation	Guest – Herself with family sings "It's Always Australia for Me"	TV special, AUSTRALIA
1988	The 1988 N.S.W. Royal Bicentennial Concert	Guest – Herself sings "It's Always Australia for Me" / "Suddenly" with Cliff Richard	TV special, AUSTRALIA
1988	Good Morning Australia	Herself – Guest	TV series, 1 episode
1988	Olivia Down Under	Herself	HBO special
1989	The Bert Newton Show	Guest – Herself with Pat Farrar in Sydney studio	TV series, 1 episode AUSTRALIA
1989	The Early Bird Show	Guest – Herself	TV series, 1 episode, AUSTRALIA
1990	Timeless Tales from Hallmark	Herself – Host	6 episodes
1990	Tonight Live With Steve Vizard	Herself via satellite Los Angeles	TV series, 1 episode, AUSTRALIA
1990	Tonight Live With Steve Vizard	Herself with Pat Farrar chat about Koala Blue Opening Melbourne store	TV series, 1 episode, AUSTRALIA
1991	The World Tonight	Herself chats to Clive Robertson about last 6 months in candid interview	TV series, 1 episode, AUSTRALIA
1993	Paradise Beach	Guest cameo as herself with Matt Lattanzi & Chloe Lattanzi	TV series, 1 episode, AUSTRALIA
1994	Australia's Best for the Bush Concert	Herself sings "No Matter What You Do"	TV special, AUSTRALIA
1994	Ray Martin Presents... Olivia Newton-John	Herself in live TV interview. Performs "I Honestly Love You" / "No Matter What You Do" / "Don't Cut Me Down" Music clips include "Here, There & Everywhere" / "Let Me Be There" / "Greensleeves" "Physical"/	TV special, AUSTRALIA
1994	Midday With Derryn Hinch	Guest – Herself chats to Derryn Hinch on her birthday	TV series, 1 episode, AUSTRALIA
1994	Rugby League Grand Final	Herself with Tommy Emmanuel on guitar sing "Australian National Anthem"	TV special, AUSTRALIA
1994; 1998	Hey Hey It's Saturday	Herself sings "No Matter What You Do"	TV series, 1 episode, AUSTRALIA
1994; 1998	Good Morning Australia	Guest – Herself chats to Bert Newton in candid TV interview	TV series, 1 episode, AUSTRALIA
1995	The Man from Snowy River aka Snowy River: The McGregor Saga	Joanna Walker	Recurring role (3 episodes)
1995	Ned and Stacey	Herself	Episode: "Reality Check"
1995	Is This Your Life?	Herself	Extended interview with Andrew Neil on Channel 4 in the UK
1994 - 1996	Wild Life (A.K.A. Human Nature)	Herself	She & the team capture the extraordinary relationships between humans and nature.
1996	This Is Your Life: Billy Thorpe	Herself & Sister Rona send a message to Billy from Malibu	TV series, 1 episode, AUSTRALIA
1996; 1997	This Is Your Life: Raelene Boyle	Herself sings a message to Raelene from Malibu	TV series, 1 episode, AUSTRALIA
1997	Tracey Takes On...	Herself	Episode: "Childhood"
1997	Murphy Brown	Herself	Episode: "I Hear a Symphony"
1997	This Is Your Life: Ian Turpie	Herself sends a message to Ian via Malibu	TV series, 1 episode, AUSTRALIA
1997	This Is Your Life: Judith Durham	Herself sends a message to Judith from Malibu home	TV series, 1 episode, AUSTRALIA
1998	Rewind	Guest as herself	TV series, 1 episode
2001	Bette	Herself	Episode: "The Invisible Mom"
2001	Good Morning America	Herself – Guest with Kelly Preston & Nancy Chuda	TV series US, 1 episode
2001	The Rosie O'Donnell Show	Herself – Guest with Kelly Preston	TV series US, 1 episode
2001	Fox News in the Morning	Herself – Guest with Kelly Preston & Nancy Chuda	TV series US, 1 episode
2001	Sue McIntosh Presents: Olivia Newton-John	Herself – Guest	TV series Australia, 1 episode
2001	Top Ten	Herself	TV series UK, 1 episode
2001	Behind The Music	Herself	TV series US, 1 episode
2001	Not Under My Roof	Herself	Video, US
2002	Rove Live	Herself – Guest	TV series Australia, 1 episode
2002	Good Morning Australia	Herself – Guest with Pat Farrar	TV series Australia, 1 episode
2002	Today	Herself – Guest with Chloe & Matt Lattanzi at "Hair" musical premiere in Melbourne	TV series Australia, 1 episode
2002	Burke's Backyard	Herself – Celebrity Gardener	TV series Australia, 1 episode
2002	VH-1 Behind The Movie: Grease	Herself	TV series US, 1 episode
2002	Vh-1 Where Are They Now?	Herself	TV series US, 1 episode
2002	This Is Your Life: Helen Reddy	Herself	TV series Australia, 1 episode
2002	The 16th Annual ARIA Awards	Herself – Aria Hall Of Fame Inductee	TV special, Australia
2002	Australians Unite: Bali Appeal	Herself	TV special, Australia
2002	An Audience With John Farnham	Herself & Sue McIntosh – Audience members	TV special, Australia
2002	Farmhand Concert for Drought Relief	Herself sings "I Honestly Love You"	TV special, Australia
2002	Mornings	Herself – Guest	TV series Australia, 1 episode
2002	A Night with Olivia	Herself	Channel 9 special
2002	Rove Live	Herself – Guest	TV series Australia, 1 episode
2002	After They Were Famous: Grease	Herself	TV series UK, 1 episode
2002	The Making Of "2"	Herself	TV special, Australia
2002	One World with Olivia Newton-John	Herself – Host	TV series US, 3 episodes
2003	Live in Japan 2003	Herself	BS-Hi special
2003	I Love the 70s	Herself – Archive clips	TV series US, 1 episode
2003	Love Is in the Air	Herself chats about early days of career through to present	ABC TV series, 1 episode 2: "She's Leaving Home"
2003; 2004	This Is Your Life: Helen Reddy	Herself sends a message to Helen via Malibu home	TV series, 1 episode, AUSTRALIA
2003, 2007	American Idol	Herself – Guest Judge	3 episodes
2004	The Sharon Osborne Show	Herself – Guest	TV series US, 1 episode
2004	The LIV Kit Infomercial	Herself	TV special, US
2004	The Jane Pauley Show	Herself – Guest	TV series US, 1 episode
2004	Enough Rope with Andrew Denton	Herself – Guest	ABC TV series, 1 episode, AUSTRALIA
2004	Sunrise	Herself – Guest	TV series, 1 episode, AUSTRALIA
2004	Parkinson	Herself – Guest sings "Anyone Who Had A Heart"	TV series UK, 1 episode
2004	This Is Your Life: Olivia Newton-John	Herself – Special Guest	TV series, 1 episode, AUSTRALIA
2005	Olivia Newton-John Gold	Herself includes music clips from Olivia in Concert	Australian TV special
2006	50 Years 50 Stars	Herself – Archive clips	TV special, AUSTRALIA
2008	Coming Home	Herself	BBC Wales Documentary, UK
2008	Sordid Lives: The Series	Bitsy Mae Harling	Supporting role (12 episodes)
2008	Kathy Griffin: My Life on the D-List	Herself	Episode: "Fly the Super Gay Skies"
2009	Sound Relief Concert	Herself sings with Barry Gibb	TV Concert special, AUSTRALIA
2009	Talking Heads	Guest – Herself chats from Gaia Retreat	ABC TV series, 1 episode, AUSTRALIA
2010	Glee	Herself	Episodes: "Bad Reputation", "Journey to Regionals"
2015	RuPaul's Drag Race	Herself – Guest Judge	Episode: "Glamazonian Airways"
2015	Dancing with the Stars	Herself – Guest Judge	Episode: "Famous Dances Night"
2017	60 Minutes	Herself in candid TV interview	TV series, 1 episode, AUSTRALIA
2017	Sunday Night	Herself in candid TV interview features husband John Easterling	TV series, 1 episode, AUSTRALIA
2018	The Morning Show	Herself in Ch 7 studio in candid TV interview	TV series, 1 episode, AUSTRALIA
2020	Behind Closed Doors	TV interview special with Natalie Morales	TV Special, US
2022	Olivia Newton-John at the BBC	Herself	BBC Two Documentary, UK
2022	Olivia Newton-John: Too Much To Lose	Herself – Archive clips	Film documentary, UNITED STATES
2023	Olivia Newton-John State Memorial	Celebration of herself	TV special, 1 episode, AUSTRALIA

== Tours ==
Headlining

- If Not for You Tour (1972)
- Clearly Love Tour (1975)
- Love Performance Tour (1976)
- Totally Hot World Tour (1978)
- Physical Tour (1982–1983)
- Greatest Hits Tour (1999)
- One Woman's Live Journey Tour (1999)
- Millennium Tour (2000)
- 30 Musical Years Tour (2001)
- Heartstrings World Tour (2002–2005)
- 2006 World Tour (2006)
- Grace and Gratitude Tour (2006)
- Body Heart & Spirit Tour (2007)
- An Evening with Olivia Newton-John (2007–2009)
- 2010 World Tour (2010)
- 2011 United States Tour (2011)
- A Summer Night with Olivia Newton-John (2012–2013)

Co-headlining

- The Main Event Tour (with John Farnham and Anthony Warlow) (1998)
- Two Strong Hearts Tour (with John Farnham) (2015)
- Liv On In Concert (with Beth Nielsen Chapman and Amy Sky) (2017)

Residency show

- Summer Nights (2014–2016)

== See also ==
- List of artists who reached number one on the US dance chart
- List of best-selling music artists
- List of British Grammy winners and nominees
- List of celebrities who own wineries and vineyards
- Olivia Newton-John: Hopelessly Devoted to You – Australian television miniseries (2018)
- Perry v. Louisiana

Awards and achievements
Preceded by Cliff Richard with "Power to All Our Friends"	UK in the Eurovision Song Contest; 1974	Succeeded by The Shadows with "Let Me Be the One"
