= Loved & Lost: The Best of Bachelor Girl =

Greatest hits album by Bachelor Girl
- Released: 15 April 2011 (Australia)
- Recorded: 1998–2004
- Genres: Pop, rock
- Label: Sony Music Australia

Bachelor Girl chronology
| Dysfunctional (2002) | Loved & Lost: The Best of Bachelor Girl (2011) | Beautifully Wrong (2011) |

"Loved & Lost: The Best of Bachelor Girl" is the first Greatest hits by Australian band Bachelor Girl. It features tracks from their two studio albums, Waiting for the Day (1998) and Dysfunctional (2002) as well as fan favourites and four previously unreleased tracks recorded between 2002-03. The album was released in Australia on 15 April 2011.

The band performed "Buses and Trains" on Sunrise on 5 May 2011. The band supported the album with a tour between 28 May 28 and 3 June.

== Background ==
Bachelor Girl were a group formed by James Roche and Tania Doko in 1992. They released their first single Buses and Trains in 1998 which peaked at number 4 in Australia. A platinum selling album quickly followed. In 2002, The group released its second studio album before amicably splitting in 2004. Roche moved to London and Doko to Sweden and worked on solo projects. In 2011, the ground decided to release a greatest hit made up of their hit singles, fan favourites and four salvaged tracks from their 2003 unreleased album Beautifully Wrong.

== Track listing ==
| No. | Title | Writer(s) | Album | Length |
|---|---|---|---|---|
| 1. | "Buses and Trains" | James Roche | Waiting for the Day | 3:39 |
| 2. | "Permission to Shine" | Bridget Benenate | Waiting for the Day | 4:15 |
| 3. | "Treat Me Good" | Roche; Tania Doko, Jimmy McDonnell | Waiting for the Day | 5:19 |
| 4. | "I'm Just a Girl" | Roche | Dysfunctional | 3:53 |
| 5. | "Lucky Me" | Roche | Waiting for the Day | 4:28 |
| 6. | "Blown Away" | S. Cutler; A. Preven | Waiting for the Day | 4:33 |
| 7. | "Rollercoaster" | P.Thornalley; M.Lewis | Dysfunctional | 3:41 |
| 8. | "Drowning Not Waving" | Roche | Dysfunctional | 4:36 |
| 9. | "This Must Be Love (Like It or Not)" (Remix) | Roche; Doko | Waiting for the Day | 4:05 |
| 10. | "Waiting for the Day" | Roche | Waiting for the Day | 5:01 |
| 11. | "Can't Wait to Meet You" | Roche; Doko | Dysfunctional | 4:15 |
| 12. | "Gotta Let You Go" | Roche; Doko | Waiting for the Day | 5:37 |
| 13. | "Come Undone" | Duran Duran | Undone: The Songs of Duran Duran | 4:49 |
| 14. | "Radio" | Aaron Hendra | new recording | 3:51 |
| 15. | "To Whom It May Concern" | Roache; Doko | new recording | 4:08 |
| 16. | "No Ordinary Day" | Doko; Irwin Thomas; Rusty Brown | new recording | 4:04 |
| 17. | "We're a Natural" | Roache | new recording | 3:48 |

=== New Tracks ===
- "Radio" - The song was recorded by both Hendra's band Supanatural and Bachelor Girl, however, neither of these albums were released. The song speaks of the power of well-loved songs being heard once again on the radio.
- "To Whom It May Concern" - The song sends a wish-list and tender invitation out into the world, like a message in a bottle. For anyone who would love to be someone's 'Yours Truly'.
- "No Ordinary Day" - The song was written on a bright sunny winter's afternoon in Melbourne. Most people can relate to the early morning other-worldliness after a joyous, unexpected, sexual debut of a new relationship. Captured perfectly in this lyric, the sweet tang of adrenalin, lack of sleep and quiet excitement becomes beautifully present.
- "We're a Natural" - Inspired by the Byron Bay surroundings, this hippy and spiritual lyric captures the earth-child's vision of perfect simplicity. Warm sand and deep twilight after a perfect beach day birthed a happy, energetic celebration of life au naturel.

== Release history ==
List of release dates, showing region, formats, label, editions and reference
| Region | Date | Format(s) | Label | Edition(s) | Catalogue |
|---|---|---|---|---|---|
| Australia | 15 April 2011 | CD; digital download | Sony Music Australia | Standard edition | 88697764362 |
