= Waiting for the Day: Artist Sessions =

Studio album by Bachelor Girl
- Released: 7 August 2026
- Recorded: 2024–2026
- Length: 58:40
- Label: Band on a Bus

Bachelor Girl chronology
Beautifully Wrong (2011)	Waiting for the Day: Artist Sessions (2026)

Singles from Waiting for the Day: Artist Sessions
- 1. "Treat Me Good" Released: 27 March 2026; 2. "Blind" Released: 24 April 2026; 3. "Blown Away" Released: 29 May 2026; 4. "Permission to Shine" Released: 10 July 2026

Waiting for the Day: Artist Sessions is the fourth studio album by Australian pop duo, Bachelor Girl. It was released on 7 August 2026 and revisits the band's ARIA-winning 1998 debut, Waiting for the Day.

To celebrate the release, the duo toured the album across Australia between July and October 2026. In October 2026, an additional 30-date ran was announced for February to May 2027.

== Background and release ==
The album was conceived to coincide with the original album's 25th anniversary, however the album took two years to create; longer than expected. Doko explained to Rolling Stone Australia: "It's nice to do anniversaries and milestone records, but what’s even better is to make sure that you’re really into it and you're proud of it."

Bachelor Girl invited each artist to "inhabit" the songs as opposed to contributing "decorative" guest vocals. Doko said Artist Sessions rests on a simple act, "asking". Asking artists they admired to enter these songs, with Doko saying: "Collaboration is not so hard if you just lean into your community." About the project, James Roch said: "It feels like we threw a party and everyone showed up." Doko added, "We're incredibly grateful to every artist, their teams, our families, our band and everyone who helped turn what felt virtually impossible into a real-life celebration of our very first song babies."

== Reception ==
Lauren Katulka from Sounds of Oz said "While the star power will encourage people to press play, it's the core elements that made this album great the first time around that inspire repeat listens. Decades have passed, but the songs on Waiting for the Day are still so good. Tania Doko and James Roche created something so special with this album, and that legacy is celebrated here." Katulka added "It's not as flawless as the original, but there are some real moments of brilliance here."

== Track listing ==
Waiting for the Day: Artist Sessions track listing
No.	Title	Writer(s)	Featured artist	Length
1.	"Blind"	Tania Doko; James Roche	Darren Hayes	3:08
2.	"My World"	Doko; Roche; Randy Goodrum; N. Sloan	Sheppard	2:55
3.	"Gotta Let You Go"	Doko; Roche	Jack Jones	5:05
4.	"Permission to Shine"	Bridget Benenate	Guy Sebastian	3:17
5.	"Mad About You"	Doko; Roche	Nervo	5:28
6.	"Treat Me Good"	Doko; Roche; Jimmy McDonnell	Jessica Mauboy	2:55
7.	"Don't Hold Back"	Roche; Michael O'Rourke	Suze DeMarchi	5:16
8.	"Buses and Trains" (Sunday sessions)	Roche	Delta Goodrem	2:55
9.	"Someway, Somehow"	Doko; Roche	Wilsn	4:11
10.	"Lucky Me"	Roche	Courtney Act	3:05
11.	"Blown Away"	S. Cutler; A. Preven	Tommy Emmanuel and Ella Hooper	4:18
12.	"This Must Be Love"	Doko; Roche	Jon Stevens	3:38
13.	"I Don't Believe You"	Doko; Roche	Michael Paynter	. 3:24
14.	"You Are Afraid"	Roche	Kaylee Bell	5:00
15.	"Waiting for the Day"	Roche		3:58
Total length:				58:40

== Charts ==
Chart performance for Waiting for the Day: Artist Sessions
Chart (2026)	Peak position
Australian Albums (ARIA)	34
