= Olivia Newton-John singles discography =

Singles discography

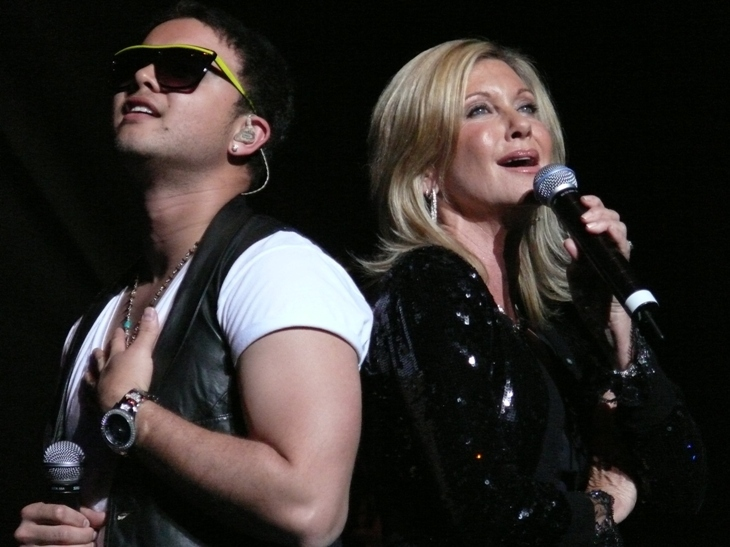
- Newton-John performing with Guy Sebastian at Sydney State Theatre in 2008
- Singles: 70
- Featured artist: 3
- Promotional singles: 19

The singles discography of English and Australian singer Olivia Newton-John consists of 70 singles, three as a featured artist and 25 promotional recordings. She was a four-time Grammy Award winner who amassed five number-one and ten other Top Ten Billboard Hot 100 singles, seven Top Ten Billboard Hot Country singles, and two number-one Billboard 200 solo albums. Ten of her singles topped Billboard's adult contemporary music singles chart. Eleven of her singles have been certified gold by the RIAA. She sold an estimated 100 million records worldwide, making her one of the world's best-selling artists of all time.

Newton-John's first chart success was the 1971 single, "If Not for You", which became a top ten recording in several countries including Australia. In 1973, "Let Me Be There" became her first single to reach commercial success in the United States. It reached number six on the Billboard Hot 100, number three on the adult contemporary chart and number seven on the country songs chart. The song established Newton-John as both a pop and country artist. Between 1974 and 1977, Newton-John regularly made the top ten on the American pop, adult contemporary and country charts. Her most successful were "If You Love Me (Let Me Know)", "Please Mr. Please", "I Honestly Love You" and "Have You Never Been Mellow". It was "I Honestly Love You" that became her most successful, topping music charts in Australia, Canada and the United States.

In 1978, Newton-John starred in the film Grease. Its success began a new era of music success for Newton-John, with "You're the One That I Want", "Summer Nights" and "Hopelessly Devoted to You" reaching the top ten of the music charts throughout the world. She transitioned further into pop music after starring in 1980's Xanadu with both "Magic" and the title track becoming number one singles internationally. However, it was 1981's "Physical" that became her most successful recording. It topped the charts in Australia, Belgium, Canada, New Zealand, United Kingdom and the United States. During the decade she continued having singles reach the top ten with songs like "Heart Attack" and "Twist of Fate".

In the 90s, Newton-John's singles began reaching progressively lower chart positions. This began after the success of the 1990 duet with John Travolta called "The Grease Megamix". The single topped the Australian pop chart and reached the top ten in several other countries. Further singles like "Deeper Than the River" and "No Matter What You Do" reached positions outside the top 40 in Australia in the middle of the decade. In 1998, she re-recorded "I Honestly Love You" and the new version made chart positions in Australia and the United States. On the American adult contemporary chart, the re-recording reached number 18. It was not until 2010 that Newton-John made several international charts with a re-recording of "Physical". The song was cut with the cast of Glee, which Newton-John appeared on. She released several more singles before her death in 2022 including the number one American dance single, "You Have to Believe".

== As lead artist ==
=== 1960s–1970s ===
List of singles, with selected chart positions and certifications
Title	Year	Peak chart positions										Certifications	Album
Title	Year	AUS	BEL	CAN	GER	NL	NZ	UK	US	US AC	US Cou.	Certifications	Album
"Till You Say You'll Be Mine"	1966	—	—	—	—	—	—	—	—	—	—		Non-album single
"If Not for You"	1971	7	29	18	—	—	—	7	25	1	—		If Not for You
"Banks of the Ohio"	1971	1	—	66	13	—	—	6	94	34	—	AUS: Gold	If Not for You
"What Is Life"	1972	—	—	—	—	—	—	16	—	34	—		Olivia
"Just a Little Too Much"	1972	—	—	—	—	—	—	—	—	—	—		Olivia
"Take Me Home, Country Roads"	1973	—	—	—	—	—	—	15	119	—	—		Let Me Be There
"Let Me Be There"	1973	11	—	5	—	—	—	—	6	3	7	MC: Platinum; RIAA: Gold	Let Me Be There
"Long Live Love"	1974	11	7	—	—	—	—	11	—	—	—		Long Live Love
"If You Love Me (Let Me Know)"	1974	2	—	4	37	—	—	56 (Note: Chart position is from the official UK "Breakers List".)	5	2	2	RIAA: Gold	If You Love Me, Let Me Know
"I Honestly Love You"	1974	1	—	1	—	—	—	22	1	1	6	RIAA: Gold	If You Love Me, Let Me Know
"Have You Never Been Mellow"	1975	10	—	1	—	—	12	—	1	1	3	RIAA: Gold	Have You Never Been Mellow
"Please Mr. Please"	1975	35	—	1	—	—	7	—	3	1	5	RIAA: Gold	Have You Never Been Mellow
"Follow Me"	1975	—	—	—	—	—	—	57	—	—	—		Have You Never Been Mellow
"Something Better to Do"	1975	60	—	26	—	—	40	—	13	1	19		Clearly Love
"Let It Shine"	1975	—	—	17	—	—	—	—	30	1	5		Clearly Love
"Come On Over"	1976	55	—	22	—	—	3	—	23	1	5		Come On Over
"Jolene"	1976	29	—	—	—	—	—	—	—	—	—		Come On Over
"Don't Stop Believin'"	1976	93	—	37	—	—	34	—	33	1	14		Don't Stop Believin'
"Every Face Tells a Story"	1976	—	—	58	—	—	—	—	55	6	21		Don't Stop Believin'
"Sam"	1977	56	—	26	—	—	16	6	20	1	40		Don't Stop Believin'
"Making a Good Thing Better"	1977	—	—	—	—	—	—	—	87	20	—		Making a Good Thing Better
"Don't Cry for Me Argentina"	1977	32	—	—	—	—	—	—	—	—	—		Making a Good Thing Better
"You're the One That I Want" (with John Travolta)	1978	1	1	2	1	1	1	1	1	23	—	BPI: Platinum; BVMI: Gold; RIAA: Platinum; RMNZ: 2× Platinum; SNEP: Gold	Grease
"Hopelessly Devoted to You"	1978	2	1	1	—	1	6	2	3	7	20	BPI: Gold; MC: Gold; RIAA: Platinum; RMNZ: Platinum	Grease
"Summer Nights" (with John Travolta)	1978	6	1	3	4	1	3	1	5	21	—	BPI: Silver; MC: Gold; RIAA: Gold; RMNZ: Platinum; SNEP: Gold	Grease
"A Little More Love"	1978	9	4	2	34	4	7	4	3	4	94	BPI: Silver; MC: Gold; RIAA: Gold	Totally Hot
"Deeper Than the Night"	1979	74	30	18	—	—	—	64	11	4	87		Totally Hot
"Totally Hot"	1979	—	16	92	—	46	—	—	52	—	—		Totally Hot
"Dancin' 'Round and 'Round"	1979	—	16	92	—	46	—	—	82	25	29		Totally Hot
"—" denotes a recording that did not chart or was not released in that territory.

=== 1980s ===
List of singles, with selected chart positions and certifications
Title	Year	Peak chart positions										Certifications	Album
Title	Year	AUS	BEL	CAN	GER	NL	NOR	NZ	UK	US	US AC	Certifications	Album
"I Can't Help It" (with Andy Gibb)	1980	62	—	32	—	—	—	—	—	12	8		After Dark
"Rest Your Love on Me" (with Andy Gibb)	1980	—	—	—	—	—	—	—	—	—	—		After Dark
"Magic"	1980	4	18	1	36	13	—	4	32	1	1	AUS: Platinum; RIAA: Gold	Xanadu
"Xanadu" (with Electric Light Orchestra)	1980	2	1	9	1	1	1	8	1	8	2	BPI: Silver	Xanadu
"Suddenly" (with Cliff Richard)	1980	37	—	60	—	—	—	30	15	20	4		Xanadu
"Physical"	1981	1	1	1	4	6	—	1	7	1	29	ARIA: Platinum; BPI: Silver; MC: 2× Platinum; RIAA: Platinum	Physical
"Make a Move on Me"	1982	8	—	4	38	49	—	22	43	5	6	MC: Gold	Physical
"Landslide"	1982	—	18	—	—	39	—	—	18	52	—		Physical
"Heart Attack"	1982	22	18	2	51	—	5	11	46	3	—	MC: Gold	Olivia's Greatest Hits Vol. 2
"Tied Up"	1983	54	—	43	—	—	—	—	—	38	—		Olivia's Greatest Hits Vol. 2
"Twist of Fate"	1983	4	33	5	—	42	—	22	57	5	—	MC: Gold	Two of a Kind
"Livin' in Desperate Times"	1984	81	—	43	—	—	—	—	—	31	—		Two of a Kind
"Take a Chance" (with John Travolta)	1984	—	—	—	—	—	—	—	—	—	3		Two of a Kind
"Soul Kiss"	1985	20	—	21	—	38	—	—	100	20	20		Soul Kiss
"Toughen Up"	1986	69	—	—	—	—	—	—	—	—	—		Soul Kiss
"The Best of Me" (with David Foster)	1986	—	—	17	—	—	—	—	—	80	6		David Foster
"The Rumour"	1988	35	—	50	36	—	—	—	85	62	33		The Rumour
"Can't We Talk It Over in Bed"	1988	—	—	—	—	—	—	—	—	—	—		The Rumour
"Reach Out for Me"	1989	153	—	—	—	—	—	—	—	—	32		Warm and Tender
"When You Wish Upon a Star"	1989	—	—	—	—	—	—	—	—	—	—		Warm and Tender
"—" denotes a recording that did not chart or was not released in that territory.

=== 1990s ===
List of singles, with selected chart positions
Title	Year	Peak chart positions										Certifications	Album
Title	Year	AUS	BEL	CAN	GER	NL	NOR	NZ	UK	US	US AC	Certifications	Album
"The Grease Megamix" (with John Travolta)	1990	1	8	50	42	7	5	7	3	—	—	ARIA: Platinum	Non-album singles
"Grease: The Dream Mix" (with Frankie Valli and John Travolta)	1991	—	28	—	—	11	—	—	47	—	—		Non-album singles
"I Need Love"	1992	109	—	—	—	—	—	—	75	96	—		Back to Basics: The Essential Collection 1971–1992
"Deeper Than a River"	1992	136	—	—	—	—	—	—	—	—	20		Back to Basics: The Essential Collection 1971–1992
"No Matter What You Do"	1994	35	—	—	—	—	—	—	—	—	—		Gaia: One Woman's Journey
"Don't Cut Me Down"	1995	193	—	—	—	—	—	—	—	—	—		Gaia: One Woman's Journey
"Had to Be" (with Cliff Richard)	1995	—	—	—	—	—	—	—	22	—	—		Songs from Heathcliff
"You're the One That I Want" (Martian remix) (with John Travolta)	1998	27	33	—	—	62	—	—	4	—	—		Grease: The Remix EP
"I Honestly Love You" (1998 version)	1998	111	—	—	—	—	—	—	—	67	18		Back with a Heart
"Back with a Heart"	1998	215	—	—	—	—	—	—	—	—	—		Back with a Heart
"Precious Love"	1998	215	—	—	—	—	—	—	—	—	—		Back with a Heart
"—" denotes a recording that did not chart or was not released in that territory.

=== 2000s ===
List of singles, with selected chart positions and certifications
Title	Year	Peak chart positions		Album
Title	Year	CAN AC	US AC	Album
"Change of Heart" (with Jim Brickman)	2000	—	—	My Romance
"Valentine" (with Jim Brickman)	2001	—	—	My Romance
"Instrument of Peace"	2006	45	30	Grace and Gratitude
"Christmas on My Radio"	2007	11	—	Christmas Wish
"Angel in the Wings" (featuring Jann Arden)	2008	26	—	A Celebration in Song
"Hope Is Always Here" (featuring David Foster)	2009	—	—	Non-album single
"—" denotes a recording that did not chart or was not released in that territory.

=== 2010s–2020s ===
List of singles, with selected chart positions and certifications
Title	Year	Peak chart positions		Album
Title	Year	AUS	US Cou.	Album
"Help Me to Heal"	2010	—	—	Grace and Gratitude: Renewed
"Magic" (Peach & Murphy mix) (featuring Wacci)	2011	79	—	Non-album singles
"When You Wish Upon a Star" (2011 version)	2011	—	—	Non-album singles
"Window in the Wall" (with Chloe Lattanzi)	2021	—	—	Just the Two of Us: The Duets Collection (Vol. 1)
"Put Your Head on My Shoulder" (with Paul Anka)	2021	—	—	Just the Two of Us: The Duets Collection (Vol. 1)
"Valentine" (25th Anniversary Remix) (with Jim Brickman)	2022	—	—	Non-album single
"Jolene" (re-recorded) (with Dolly Parton)	2023	—	— (Note: "Jolene" did not enter the Billboard Hot Country Songs chart, but peaked at number 13 on the Country Digital Song Sales chart.)	Just the Two of Us: The Duets Collection (Vol. 1)
"My Dream" (with Jim Brickman and Il Volo)	2024	—	—	30th Anniversary with the World Symphony
"Oh Come All Ye Faithful" (with Jane Lynch)	2024	—	—	Angels in the Snow
"—" denotes a recording that did not chart or was not released in that territory.

== As featured artist ==
List of singles, with selected chart positions and certifications
Title	Year	Peak chart positions					Album
Title	Year	AUS	CAN	UK	US	US Dan.	Album
"Physical" (Glee cast featuring Olivia Newton-John)	2010	88	62	56	89	—	Glee: The Music, Volume 3 Showstoppers
"I Touch Myself" (as part of the I Touch Myself Project)	2014	72	—	—	—	—	The I Touch Myself Project
"You Have to Believe" (Dave Audé featuring Olivia Newton-John and Chloe Lattanzi)	2015	—	—	—	—	1	Non-album single
"—" denotes releases that did not chart or were not released in that territory.

== Promotional singles ==
List of promotional singles
Title	Year	Album
"Love Song"	1971	If Not for You
"If You Could Read My Mind"	1972	If Not for You
"I'm a Small and Lonely Light"	1972	Olivia
"Maybe Then I'll Think of You"	1973	Non-album single
"Loving You Ain't Easy"	1974	Long Live Love
"A Window to the Sky"	1975	The Other Side of the Mountain
"Loving Arms"	1975	Have You Never Been Mellow
"Follow Me"	1975	Have You Never Been Mellow
"Compassionate Man"	1976	Don't Stop Believin'
"Sad Songs"	1977	Making a Good Thing Better
"Slow Dancing"	1977	Making a Good Thing Better
"Suspended in Time"	1980	Xanadu
"Face to Face" (with Barry Gibb)	1984	Now Voyager
"Emotional Tangle"	1985	Soul Kiss
"It's Always Australia for Me"	1988	The Rumour
"Warm and Tender"	1990	Warm and Tender
"I Want to Be Wanted"	1992	Back to Basics: The Essential; Collection, 1971–1992
"Falling" (with Raybon Brothers)	1997	Raybon Brothers
"Dare to Dream" (with John Farnham)	2000	The Games of the XXVII Olympiad
"Tenterfield Saddler" (with Peter Allen)	2002	2
"Phenomenal Woman"	2005	Stronger Than Before
"Mickey" (Chew Fu Fix)	2012	A Few Best Men
"Two Strong Hearts" (Live) (with John Farnham)	2015	Two Strong Hearts Live
"Somewhere Over the Rainbow" (Live) (with John Farnham)	2015	Two Strong Hearts Live
"Stone in My Pocket" (with Beth Nielsen Chapman and Amy Sky)	2016	Liv On
"Love Is a Gift" (with Delta Goodrem)	2018	I Honestly Love You

== Other appearances ==
Title	Year	Other artist(s)	Album
"The Day I Met Marie"	1967	The Shadows	From Hank Bruce Brian & John
"Come In You'll Get Pneumonia"	1967	The Easybeats	Vigil
"Don't Move Away"	1971	Cliff Richard	Sunny Honey Girl
"Susie Darlin'"	1973	Barry Crocker, Pat Carroll	Golden Hits
"Fly Away"	1975	John Denver	Windsong
"The Key"	1979	—N/a	Music for UNICEF Concert
"Fine Line"	1984	Barry Gibb	Now Voyager
"Hammerhead"	1987	James Reyne	James Reyne
"I'm Leaving It All Up to You"	1994	Cliff Richard	It's Cliff Richard - Show No.6
"All I Have to Do Is Dream"	1994	Cliff Richard	It's Cliff Richard - Show No.6
"Rolling on a River (Proud Mary)"	1994	Cliff Richard	It's Cliff Richard - Show No.6
"Away in a Manger"	1994	—N/a	The Spirit of Christmas '94
"Choosing When It's Too Late"	1995	Cliff Richard	Songs from Heathcliff
"Dream Tomorrow"	1995	Cliff Richard	Songs from Heathcliff
"I Do Not Love You Isabella"	1995	Cliff Richard	Songs from Heathcliff
"Marked with Death"	1995	Cliff Richard	Songs from Heathcliff
"Christmas Never Felt Like This"	1995	—N/a	Mother & Child
"Part of Your World"	1996	—N/a	Music from the Park
"How To Grow Up Big and Strong"	1996	—N/a	Orphans of God
"You're the One That I Want"	1996	Francis Lalanne	Best of Dance Music Vol. 4
"The First Noel"	1999	—N/a	The Spirit of Christmas '99
"Flying Dreams"	2000	Kenny Loggins	More Songs from Pooh Corner
"A Mother's Christmas Wish"	2000	Jim Brickman	My Romance
"Have Yourself a Merry Little Christmas"	2000	Kenny Loggins	The Spirit of Christmas 2000
"Sordid Lives"	2001	—N/a	Sordid Lives
"Will the Circle Be Unbroken?"	2001	—N/a	Sordid Lives
"Coming Home"	2001	—N/a	Sordid Lives
"A Handful of Dust"	2002	Lee Kernaghan	Electric Rodeo
"Lullaby, Lullaby, My Lovely One"	2003	Delilah	My Child
"Silver Bells"	2003	—N/a	The Spirit of Christmas 2003
"This Can't Be Real"	2004	Barry Manilow	Scores: Songs from the Copacabana and Harmony
"Wishin' and Hopin'"	2006	Dionne Warwick	My Friends & Me
"I Honestly Love You"	2007	Jim Brickman	Homecoming
"Cotton Jenny"	2007	Anne Murray	Anne Murray Duets: Friends & Legends
"Christmas Lullaby"	2007	Mannheim Steamroller	Christmas Song
"Slow Love"	2008	Mariya Takeuchi	Sincerely... Mariya Takeuchi Song Book
"O Holy Night"	2008	—N/a	The Spirit of Christmas 2008
"Every Time It Snows"	2008	Mark Masri	Christmas Is
"A Mother's Christmas Wish"	2008	Amy Sky	The Lights of December
"O Come, All Ye Faithful"	2008	Elvis Presley	Christmas Duets
"Amoureuse"	2010	Elaine Paige	Elaine Paige and Friends
"Isn't It Amazing"	2012	—N/a	Hope: Songs of Faith and Inspiration
"Canadian Summer Dream"	2013	Liona Boyd	The Return... To Canada with Love
"Never Never Never"	2014	Engelbert Humperdinck	Engelbert Calling
"Best of Friends"	2016	—N/a	The Best Songs from The Land Before Time
"How Can You Mend a Broken Heart"	2016	Kelly Lang	Throwback
"Getting Better All the Time"	2016	Marie Osmond	Music Is Medicine
"Fulfilled"	2016	Steve Real	Never Too Late
"Everybody's Someone"	2018	Cliff Richard	Rise Up
"Two Strong Hearts" (with John Farnham)	2020	various artists	Artists Unite for Fire Fight
"You're the Voice" (with John Farnham, Mitch Tambo and Brian May)	2020	various artists	Artists Unite for Fire Fight
"Merry Christmas to You"	2020	Delta Goodrem	Only Santa Knows
"Rest Your Love on Me"	2021	Barry Gibb	Greenfields

== See also ==
- Olivia Newton-John albums discography
- Olivia Newton-John videography
