= Christmas (Delta Goodrem EP) =

EP by Delta Goodrem
- Released: 14 December 2012
- Recorded: October – December 2012; Studios 301, Sydney
- Genre: Christmas, pop, soul
- Length: 16:26
- Label: Sony Music
- Producer: Delta Goodrem, Vince Pizzinga

Delta Goodrem chronology
Child of the Universe (2012)	Christmas (2012)	Innocent Eyes: Ten Year Anniversary Acoustic Edition (2013)

Christmas is an EP by Australian singer–songwriter Delta Goodrem, released on 14 December 2012 by Sony Music Australia. It is her first collection of Christmas music, after previously contributing several Christmas recordings to The Spirit of Christmas album series.

== Promotion ==
A lyric video for the track "Blue Christmas", which is also featured on The Spirit of Christmas 2012, was released on 17 December 2012. Goodrem performed "Blue Christmas" and "Amazing Grace" from the EP at the 2012 Carols by Candlelight event on Christmas Eve.

== Track listing ==
No.	Title	Writer(s)	Length
1.	"Blue Christmas"	Billy Hayes, Jay W. Johnson	3:21
2.	"Santa Claus Is Back in Town"	Jerry Leiber, Mike Stoller	2:38
3.	"O Holy Night"	Adolphe Adam, John Sullivan Dwight	4:06
4.	"God Rest Ye Merry Gentlemen"	Traditional	2:55
5.	"Amazing Grace"	John Newton	3:24
Total length:			16:26

== Other recordings ==
The following Christmas tracks were not released on the album, but were released previously.

Title	Single/Album
"Do You Hear What I Hear?"	The Spirit of Christmas 2002
"Have Yourself a Merry Little Christmas"	The Spirit of Christmas 2003
"Happy Xmas (War Is Over)"	"Predictable"
"O Come All Ye Faithful"	The Spirit of Christmas 2006
"Little Drummer Boy"	The Spirit of Christmas 2010

== Charts ==
The EP debuted at number 67 on the ARIA singles chart, selling 2399 copies in its first week.

Chart (2012)	Peak position
Australia (ARIA)	67
Australian Artist Albums (ARIA)	12

== Release history ==
Country	Date	Format	Label
Australia	14 December 2012	CD, digital download	Sony Music Australia
New Zealand	14 December 2012	CD, digital download	Sony Music Australia

== Personnel ==
- Delta Goodrem — vocals, piano, producer
- Michael Dolce — guitars
- Emile Nelson — double bass
- Vince Pizzinga — cello, strings, co-producer
- Adam Sofo — piano, keyboards
- Simon Todkill — recording, mixing
- Warren Trout — drums, percussion
- Leon Zervos — mastering
