= Speak (Bachelor Girl song) =

- Digital cover

Single by Bachelor Girl
- Released: 18 June 2018
- Length: 3:35
- Label: Tef

Bachelor Girl singles chronology
| "Drowning Not Waving" (2002) | "Speak" (2018) |

"Speak" is a song by Australian pop group Bachelor Girl. The song is due for release on 18 June 2018, twenty years since the release of the group's debut single "Buses and Trains".

It is the group's first single in 16 years and tackles the theme of the correlation between technology and depression in the young.

Tania Doko said: "I feel strongly that "Speak" is the first offering back for the band – personally, it's a wake-up call and hopefully a 3 minute 30 reminder out there that we're humans, not just hashtags." James Roche added: "Imagine our world if we develop a group agreement that speaking the truth and acting with integrity is normal."

Discussing the song, Doko said: "I wanted to reflect on a worrying trend: since the onset of the smart phone, there's been a global, dramatic spike in depression, especially among our young people. Not discounting that technology provides a voice for many, we face a conundrum. In this digital 'virtual' age, social media, data, algorithms and fake news often determine behaviour and self-esteem, leaving real conversation, human connection and truth itself frequently sacrificed. Whether it's sharing day to day goings on, or serious issues like abuse and bullying, no device can replace the value of real-life communication."

The music video was released on 18 June 2018.

== Background ==
Bachelor Girl formed in 1992 and released their debut studio album Waiting for the Day in 1998. The album won an ARIA Award in 1999 and was certified platinum. The album spawned the platinum selling and APRA Award-winning single "Buses and Trains". In 2002, the group released their second studio album Dysfunctional before commencing a hiatus in 2004 when Roche moved to London. In 2011, the group, briefly reformed and released a greatest hits album as well as a third studio album of songs recorded prior to the hiatus. Since 2012, Doko has been living in Stockholm while Roche has worked with a number of Australian artists, including Anthony Callea on his 2016 number-one album, Backbone. In 2016, the duo performed together in Australia for an Australia Day concert. In 2017, Roche travelled to Sweden and wrote songs with Doko, which inspired the duo to record new songs together. The duo said: "Things really sparked, it reminded us why we started working together in the first place way back then – the joy of writing and making music together. We're just so excited about the new songs, they're better than ever before."

== Track listing ==
Digital download

1. "Speak" – 3:35

== Release history ==
| Country | Release date | Format | Label |
|---|---|---|---|
| Australia | 18 June 2018 | Digital download, streaming | Tef |
