= The Spirit of Christmas 1996 =

Compilation album by various artists
- Released: November 1996
- Recorded: 1996
- Genre: Christmas
- Length: 50:19
- Label: Myer Grace Bros., Sony BMG
- Producer: Lindsay Field, Glenn Wheatley

The Spirit of Christmas chronology
The Spirit of Christmas 1995 (1995)	The Spirit of Christmas 1996 (1996)	The Spirit of Christmas 1998 (1998)

The Spirit of Christmas 1996 is the fourth compilation album of Christmas-associated tracks in the annual Spirit of Christmas series. It was released in Australia in November 1996 with proceeds going to the Starlight Foundation. The compilation has contributions from various Australian artists and was produced by Lindsay Field (also compiler) and Glenn Wheatley. It was issued on cassette and CD by Myer Grace Bros. and distributed by Sony BMG.

== Background ==
The Spirit of Christmas series started in 1993 when Myer, an Australian department store, wished to continue their philanthropic support in the community, "whilst at the same time providing something special for everyone to enjoy". They choose the Salvation Army's Red Shield Appeal for at-risk children and youth throughout the country as the first recipients but in 1996 they choose the Australian branch of the Starlight Foundation. Session and touring musician, Lindsay Field was the executive producer and compiler. Field contacted various fellow Australian musicians – including those he had worked with personally – to donate a track for the compilation, most commonly a new rendition of a standard Christmas carol. Together with Glenn Wheatley (former member of The Masters Apprentices and manager of Little River Band), Field produced the recording for Myer Grace Bros. own label which was distributed by Sony BMG.

== Track listing ==
1. "God Rest Ye Merry, Gentlemen" – CDB with KPS Jam – 3:52
2. "Mary's Boy Child" – Christine Anu – 5:18
3. "Santa Claus Is Back in Town" – The Badloves – 3:21
4. "This Christmas" – Deni Hines – 4:27
5. "How to Make Gravy" – Paul Kelly – 5:16
6. "Silent Night" – James Reyne – 4:23
7. "The Little Boy that Santa Claus Forgot" – John Farnham – 2:42
8. "O Happy Day" – Judith Durham – 4:34
9. "Sleigh Ride" – ABC Melbourne Symphony Orchestra – 3:03
10. "Happy Xmas (War Is Over)" – Tim Finn – 4:12
11. "Away in a Manger – Gina Jeffreys – 3:03
12. "Santa Claus Is Coming to Town" – Frankie J Holden – 4:02
13. "Trim the Tree" – Diesel and Wilson – 2:06

== See also ==
- The Spirit of Christmas (compilation album)
- 1996 in music
