= The Spirit of Christmas 1998 =

Compilation album by various artists
- Released: November 1998
- Recorded: 1998
- Genre: Christmas
- Length: 52:33
- Label: Myer Grace Bros.Sony BMG
- Producer: Lindsay Field, Glenn Wheatley

The Spirit of Christmas chronology
The Spirit of Christmas 1996 (1996)	The Spirit of Christmas 1998 (1998)	The Spirit of Christmas 1999 (1999)

The Spirit of Christmas 1998 is the fifth compilation album of Christmas-associated tracks in the annual Spirit of Christmas series. It was released in Australia in November 1998 with proceeds going to the Starlight Foundation. The compilation has contributions from various Australian artists and was produced by Lindsay Field (also compiler) and Glenn Wheatley. It was issued on cassette and CD by Myer Grace Bros. and distributed by Sony BMG. Nine of its fifteen tracks had been released before on previous The Spirit of Christmas compilations.

== Background ==
The Spirit of Christmas series started in 1993 when Myer, an Australian department store, wished to continue their philanthropic support in the community, "whilst at the same time providing something special for everyone to enjoy". They choose the Salvation Army's Red Shield Appeal for at-risk children and youth throughout the country as the first recipients but in 1996 and 1998 they choose the Australian branch of the Starlight Foundation. Session and touring musician, Lindsay Field was the executive producer and compiler. Field contacted various fellow Australian musicians – including those he had worked with personally – to donate a track for the compilation, most commonly a new rendition of a standard Christmas carol. However, on this compilation nine of its fifteen tracks had been released before on previous The Spirit of Christmas compilations. Together with Glenn Wheatley (former member of The Masters Apprentices and manager of Little River Band), Field produced the recording for Myer Grace Bros. own label which was distributed by Sony BMG.

== Track listing ==
1. "Carol of the Drum" – Christine Anu – 4:03 *
2. "Last Christmas" – Human Nature – 3:10
3. "Silent Night" – Vika and Linda – 3:13 *
4. "Hark the Herald Angels Sing" – Judith Durham – 2:54 *
5. "Bethlehem Morning" – Hugh Jackman – 4:07
6. "Grown-up Christmas List" – Lisa Edwards and Lindsay Field – 3:24 *
7. "O Christmas Bush" – Tania Kernaghan – 3:50
8. "Away in a Manger" – Olivia Newton-John – 2:36 *
9. "You'll Never Walk Alone" – John Farnham – 3:23 *
10. "Happy Christmas (War Is Over)" – Jimmy Barnes and Family – 4:31
11. "This Christmas" – Deni Hines – 4:26 *
12. "Merry Christmas Baby" – Stephen Cummings – 3:08 *
13. "Christmas (Baby Please Come Home)" – Diesel – 3:06 *
14. "Here Comes Santa Claus" – The Wiggles – 1:27
15. "Little Ray of Sunshine" – Glenn Shorrock – 5:15
- denotes this track had been released on a previous The Spirit of Christmas compilation.

== See also ==
- The Spirit of Christmas (compilation album)
