= The Spirit of Christmas 2005 =

Compilation album by various artists
- Released: 17 November 2005
- Recorded: 2005
- Genre: Christmas
- Label: Myer Stores, Sony BMG
- Producer: Lindsay Field, Glenn Wheatley

The Spirit of Christmas chronology
The Spirit of Christmas 2004 (2004)	The Spirit of Christmas 2005 (2005)	The Spirit of Christmas 2006 (2006)

The Spirit of Christmas 2005 is the 12th compilation album of Christmas-associated tracks in the annual Spirit of Christmas series. It was released in Australia on 17 November 2005 with proceeds going to The Salvation Army's Red Shield Appeal, which supports at-risk children and youth throughout the country. The compilation has contributions from various Australian artists and was produced by Lindsay Field (also compiler) and Glenn Wheatley. It was issued on CD by Sony BMG and distributed at Myer Stores.

== Background ==
The Spirit of Christmas series started in 1993 when Myer, an Australian department store, wished to continue their philanthropic support in the community, "whilst at the same time providing something special for everyone to enjoy". They choose The Salvation Army's Red Shield Appeal for at-risk children and youth throughout the country as the recipients in 2005. By 2005 the series had raised more than $5.2 million for the charity, Myer spokesperson, Dawn Robertson, detailed "[it has] a long tradition at Myer. We take great pride knowing our work supports the Salvation Army by providing young people with much needed services". Session and touring musician, Lindsay Field was the executive producer and compiler. Field contacted various fellow Australian musicians – including those he had worked with personally – to donate a track for the compilation, most commonly a new rendition of a standard Christmas carol. Together with Glenn Wheatley (former member of The Masters Apprentices and manager of Little River Band), Field produced the recording for Myer Stores' own label which was pressed by Sony BMG.

== Track listing ==
1. "One Little Christmas Tree" – John Farnham
2. "Frosty the Snowman" – Human Nature
3. "Jingle Bell Rock" – Adam Harvey
4. "Away in a Manger" – Vika and Linda
5. "Reach Out and Touch" – Marcia Hines
6. "White Christmas" – Tina Arena
7. "The Christmas Bug" – Daddy Cool
8. "The Christmas Song" – Anthony Callea
9. "Mary's Boy Child" / "Christmas" – Gary Pinto
10. "The Holy City" – David Hobson
11. "All I Want for Christmas Is You" – Kate Alexa
12. "Christmas in Australia" – Christine Anu
13. "Silent Night" – Axle Whitehead
14. "What a Wonderful World" – Jimmy Barnes

== See also ==
- The Spirit of Christmas (disambiguation)
- 2005 in music
