= Beechworth Prison =

Beechworth Prison may refer to one of two prisons in Beechworth, Victoria, Australia:

- HM Prison Beechworth, a medium security prison which operated from 1864 to 2004
- Beechworth Correctional Centre, a minimum security facility which has operated since 2005
