= The Spirit of Christmas 2006 =

Compilation album by various artists
- Released: 10 November 2006
- Recorded: 2006
- Genre: Christmas
- Label: Myer Stores, Sony BMG
- Producer: Lindsay Field, Glenn Wheatley

The Spirit of Christmas chronology
The Spirit of Christmas 2005 (2005)	The Spirit of Christmas 2006 (2006)	The Spirit of Christmas 2007 (2007)

The Spirit of Christmas 2006 is the 13th compilation album of Christmas-associated tracks in the annual Spirit of Christmas series. It was released in Australia on 10 November 2006 with proceeds going to The Salvation Army's Red Shield Appeal, which supports at-risk children and youth throughout the country. The compilation has contributions from various Australian artists and was produced by Lindsay Field (also compiler) and Glenn Wheatley. It was issued on CD by Sony BMG and distributed at Myer Stores.

== Background ==
The Spirit of Christmas series started in 1993 when Myer, an Australian department store, wished to continue their philanthropic support in the community, "whilst at the same time providing something special for everyone to enjoy". They choose The Salvation Army's Red Shield Appeal for at-risk children and youth throughout the country as the recipients. By 2006 the series had raised more than A$5.5 million for the charity. Session and touring musician, Lindsay Field was the executive producer and compiler. Field contacted various fellow Australian musicians – including those he had worked with personally – to donate a track for the compilation, most commonly a new rendition of a standard Christmas carol. Together with Glenn Wheatley (former member of The Masters Apprentices and manager of Little River Band), Field produced the recording for Myer Stores' own label which was pressed by Sony BMG.

== Track listing ==
1. "O Come, All Ye Faithful" – Delta Goodrem
2. "Christmas (Baby Please Come Home)" – David Campbell
3. "Have Yourself a Merry Little Christmas" – Jade MacRae
4. "Silent Night" – Paul Kelly and the Boon Companions
5. "I'll Be Home for Christmas" – Dannii Minogue
6. "The Little Drummer Boy" – Daryl Braithwaite
7. "A Christmas Lullaby" –Guy Sebastian and Gary Pinto
8. "O Holy Night" – Natalie Bassingthwaighte
9. "Amazing Grace" – Young Divas
10. "Great Big Man in Red" – The Wiggles and John Fogerty
11. "Peace in the World Tonight" – Mike Carr
12. "Christmas Dreaming" – Dannielle Gaha and Darren Percival
13. "Run Rudolph Run" – The Sparrows
14. "Daily Bread" / "Lord of the Harvest" – Andrew Legg and Southern Gospel Choir

== See also ==
- The Spirit of Christmas (disambiguation)
- 2006 in music
