= Reckless Hearts =

Reckless Hearts were a Tasmanian rock band. They relocated to Melbourne and were signed to Glenn Wheatley's label, Emerald City Records. Their extended play, Rain in Spain, featuring the track "This Town" reached the top 100 on the ARIA singles chart. By 2005 they had disbanded with Bruce Holloway and Colin Street forming a country rock duo, Holloway Street. That duo relocated to the United States in the following year. Bruce Holloway died in a traffic accident on 17 April 2009, aged 49.

== Members ==
- Bruce Holloway – guitar
- Grant Oakford – guitar
- Gavin Miles – keyboards
- Patrick Cranny – vocals
- Colin Street – bass
- Peter Manaena – drums (a.k.a. ma9na)

(Paul Hiscutt was the original drummer involved in the major touring and studio recordings)

== Discography ==
=== Extended plays ===
List of EPs, with selected chart positions
Title	Details	Peak chart positions
Title	Details	AUS
Rain in Spain	Released: 1993; Label: Emerald City, Polydor; Format: CD	89
