= The Spirit of Christmas 1995 =

Compilation album by various artists
- Released: November 1995
- Recorded: 1995
- Genre: Christmas
- Length: 51:50
- Label: Myer Grace Bros., Sony BMG
- Producer: Lindsay Field, Glenn Wheatley

The Spirit of Christmas chronology
The Spirit of Christmas 1994 (1994)	The Spirit of Christmas 1995 (1995)	The Spirit of Christmas 1996 (1996)

The Spirit of Christmas 1995 is the third compilation album of Christmas-associated tracks in the annual Spirit of Christmas series. It was released in Australia in November 1995 with proceeds going to the Red Shield Appeal by the Salvation Army for at-risk children and youth throughout the country. The compilation has contributions from various Australian artists and was produced by Lindsay Field (also compiler) and Glenn Wheatley. It was issued on cassette and CD by Myer Grace Bros. and distributed by Sony BMG.

== Background ==
The Spirit of Christmas series started in 1993 when Myer, an Australian department store, wished to continue their philanthropic support in the community, "whilst at the same time providing something special for everyone to enjoy". They choose the Salvation Army's Red Shield Appeal for at-risk children and youth throughout the country as the recipients. Session and touring musician, Lindsay Field was appointed the executive producer and compiler. Field contacted various fellow Australian musicians – including those he had worked with personally – to donate a track for the compilation, most commonly a new rendition of a standard Christmas carol. Together with Glenn Wheatley (former member of The Masters Apprentices and manager of Little River Band), Field produced the recording for Myer Grace Bros. own label which was distributed by Sony BMG.

== Track listing ==
1. "Carol of the Drum" – Christine Anu – 4:07
2. "God Rest You Merry, Gentlemen" – Australian Cast and Orchestra of Miss Saigon – 2:49
3. "Bambino" – Judith Durham – 3:42
4. "Mary's Boy Child" – Lee Kernaghan – 3:20
5. "The Christmas Song" – Venetta Fields with the ABC Melbourne Symphony Orchestra – 4:54
6. "Happy Christmas (War Is Over)" – Australian Cast of Beauty and the Beast featuring Michael Cormick – 3:47
7. "Christmas (Baby Please Come Home)" – Diesel – 3:03
8. "2000 Miles" – Merril Bainbridge – 3:17
9. "Grown-Up Christmas List" – Lisa Edwards and Lindsay Field – 3:21
10. "Coventry Carol" – Marina Prior – 3:32
11. "Once in Royal David's City" – Daryl Braithwaite – 4:14
12. "Silent Night" – Vika and Linda – 3:13
13. "Merry Christmas Baby" – The Black Sorrows – 5:00
14. "Merry Christmas Everybody" – Jimmy Barnes – 3:31

== See also ==
- The Spirit of Christmas (compilation album)
- 1995 in music
