= The Spirit of Christmas 1999 =

Compilation album by various artists
- Released: November 1999
- Recorded: 1999
- Genre: Christmas
- Length: 46:48
- Label: Myer Grace Bros., Sony BMG
- Producer: Lindsay Field, Glenn Wheatley

The Spirit of Christmas chronology
The Spirit of Christmas 1998 (1998)	The Spirit of Christmas 1999 (1999)	The Spirit of Christmas 2000 (2000)

The Spirit of Christmas 1999 is the sixth compilation album of Christmas-associated tracks in the annual Spirit of Christmas series. It was released in Australia in November 1999 with proceeds going to The Salvation Army's Red Shield Appeal, which supports at-risk children and youth throughout the country. The compilation has contributions from various Australian artists and was produced by Lindsay Field (also compiler) and Glenn Wheatley. It was issued on cassette and CD by Myer Grace Bros. and distributed by Sony BMG.

== Background ==
The Spirit of Christmas series started in 1993 when Myer, an Australian department store, wished to continue their philanthropic support in the community, "whilst at the same time providing something special for everyone to enjoy". They choose the Salvation Army's Red Shield Appeal for at-risk children and youth throughout the country as the first recipients but in 1996 and 1998 they choose the Australian branch of the Starlight Foundation and returned to the Salvation Army in 1999. Session and touring musician, Lindsay Field was the executive producer and compiler. Field contacted various fellow Australian musicians – including those he had worked with personally – to donate a track for the compilation, most commonly a new rendition of a standard Christmas carol. Together with Glenn Wheatley (former member of The Masters Apprentices and manager of Little River Band), Field produced the recording for Myer Grace Bros. own label which was distributed by Sony BMG.

== Track listing ==
1. "Away in a Manger" – Human Nature – 2:01
2. "Nothing but a Child" – Lisa McCune and Nick Barker – 4:26
3. "New Miracle" – Bachelor Girl – 3:52
4. "Have Yourself a Merry Little Christmas" – Tom Burlinson – 4:58
5. "Home for Christmas" – Vanessa Amorosi – 3:55
6. "The First Noel" – Olivia Newton-John – 3:41
7. "Christmas for Cowboys" – Troy Cassar-Daley – 2:53
8. "I Remember" – Kate Ceberano – 4:48
9. "Mary's Boy Child" – Archie Roach – 2:58
10. "The Lord's Prayer" – Marcia Hines – 3:50
11. "Small One" – John Farnham – 2:45
12. "Silent Night" – Jane Rutter – 3:56
13. "Pretty Paper" – Johnny O'Keefe – 2:45

== See also ==
- The Spirit of Christmas (compilation album)
- 1999 in music
