= Lisa Edwards =

Australian singer and musician (born 1957)

- Born: Lisa Anne Edwards; 25 September 1958 (age 67); Adelaide, South Australia, Australia
- Occupations: Singer; musician
- Instruments: Vocals; percussion; flute
- Years active: 1978–present
- Labels: Emerald City; Polydor; Warner
- Website: lisaedwards.com.au

Lisa Anne Edwards (born 25 September 1958) is an Australian solo and session singer and musician. In July 1992, she had a top 5 hit on the ARIA Singles Chart with her cover version of Godley and Creme's "Cry". Edwards is primarily a backing vocalist and has worked for fellow Australian and international artists, including John Farnham and Kylie Minogue.

Edwards also provided vocals on Real Life's "Send Me an Angel" and Olivia Newton-John's "Stronger Than Before". As a solo artist, Edwards has issued two studio albums, Thru the Hoop (1993) and State of the Heart (2005).

== Early and personal life ==
Lisa Anne Edwards was born in 1958 in Adelaide. Her father is a jazz pianist and her mother was a stage performer. Edwards made her stage debut aged seven with her father, who regularly took her with him. In secondary school, with three other students, she formed a quartet, Harmony, which went from talent programs to performing on the club circuit. For most of her career, she has been based in Melbourne. Edwards' domestic partner is Michael Turner, a barrister, and the couple have a child.

== Solo career ==
Lisa Edwards began her career as a solo artist and backing singer in the late 1970s, in South Australia and Sydney, supporting artists including the Seekers, the Platters, the Drifters and the Pointer Sisters. In September 1981, she issued her debut single, "Centre Spread", on Mushroom Records. It was the theme song for a film soundtrack of the same name. The song was written and co-produced by John C. Sharp, which was recorded and mixed at Pepper Studios in Adelaide.

Her second single, "You Are My Melbourne", was a duet with Adrian Campbell in 1985. According to George Wilson of The Sydney Morning Herald it was written by Indian-born Australian resident, Raj Marwah. It was provided to celebrate of the 150th anniversary of the foundation of Melbourne. Also in that year she provided vocals on Joe Lamont's album, Secrets You Keep.

In 1986 Edwards was lead vocalist in Short Circuit, a dance-disco group with Trevor Courtney on drums. Both Edwards and Courtney joined White Light Orchestra, a 36-member ensemble, which issued an album, Halley's Comet, in April. Mike Daly of The Age described the track, "Moon and Stars", as an "uninspiring piece of technopop", which, written by "Bill Miller, is sung by [Edwards]." Edwards and Lindsay Field provided vocals for the score of the comedy feature film, "Crocodile" Dundee (April 1986), with music composed by Peter Best. Edwards sang "Playing with Fire", music by Frank Strangio and lyrics by Eve Dembowski, for the feature film, Dead End Drive-In (August 1986).

Turbo Luv Nuns was a group, in 1987, with Edwards on backing vocals, Ronnie Charles (ex-The Groop) on lead vocals, Peter Coughlan on bass guitar, Mark Greig (ex-Australian Crawl) on lead guitar and Des McKenna on drums. They issued an album, They Don't Know. She also provided vocals for Short Circuit's album, Waiting for the Big One (1988). In that year she joined with members of Schnell Fenster – Phil Judd on guitar, trumpet, keyboards and vocals; Nigel Griggs on bass guitar; Noel Crombie on drums and percussion; and Michael den Elzen on guitars, guitar synth, fretless guitar and keyboards – to form Noel's Cowards with Vika Bull on vocals; Michael Harris on fiddle; Wendy Matthews on lead vocals; and Louis McManus on mandolin. They provided six songs for the soundtrack of the feature film Rikky and Pete (1988).

In April 1992 Edwards issued a single, "Cry", which reached the top 5 on the ARIA Singles Chart. It is a cover version of Godley and Creme's single (March 1985). On the ARIA End of Year Singles Chart for 1992, it reached No. 41. She released her debut solo album, Thru the Hoop, in May 1993, with backing vocals from Farnham and Jack Jones (of John Farnham Band and Southern Sons). Bevan Hannan of The Canberra Times, rated the album as seven out of ten.

Hannan praised the opening track, "Satisfy Me", as having a "funky feel [that] grabs you by the ears, the type of sound which you would swear was stripped from Kate Ceberano's Brave or Think About It." He opined that the rest of the album "doesn't sink to wallowing depths, but the conservative nature of the other nine tracks only earns it a solid rating." Edwards wrote the track, "Stay with Me", which Hannan described as "first class". Subsequent singles, "So Dangerous' (1992)", "Until the Day" (June 1993) and "Lose Myself in You" (September), had less chart success, and Edwards returned to performing as a backing singer.

From 1993 Edwards has contributed Christmas carols for the annual The Spirit of Christmas album series, which is produced and compiled by fellow John Farnham Band backing singer, Lindsay Field. Her tracks include "Do You Hear What I Hear?" in November 1993, "I'll Be Home for Christmas" (duet with Field) and "Amazing Grace" (quartet with Field, Farnham and Venetta Fields) in November 1994, "Grown-Up Christmas List" (duet with Field) in November 1994 and compiled in November 1998 and "The Twelve Days of Christmas" (duet with Field) in November 2002.

In 2001, Edwards, Debra Byrne and Wendy Stapleton toured with Girls, Girls, Girls a tribute show of hits by the Supremes, Cilla Black, Dusty Springfield, Patsy Cline and Lulu. After a month, Edwards returned to backing vocals for John Farnham on his The Last Time Tour; she was replaced by Nikki Nicholls, Girls, Girls, Girls continued touring into 2002.

She released her second solo studio album, State of the Heart, in August 2005, which included a cover version of Icehouse's single, "Man of Colours" (February 1988). State of the Heart reached No. 19 on the ARIA Hitseekers Albums Chart. Georgie Bryant of MediaSearch website felt it was "quite interesting" how Edwards handles "famous Australian songs with [her] own interpretation." Edwards' solo performances are often based around tributes to her childhood idols: Ella Fitzgerald, Sarah Vaughan, Billie Holiday, Diana Ross and Natalie Cole.

Edwards released her third studio album, I'm Still the Woman, in 2022.

== Backing vocalist for national and international performers ==
Aside from vocals Lisa Edwards plays percussion and flute: initially she was recruited as a flautist for the John Farnham Band in 1988. She has been one of his backing vocalists for both studio sessions and touring from Age of Reason (July 1988) to Jack (October 2010), inclusive.

Aside from Farnham, Edwards has provided vocals for fellow Australian artists, Noiseworks, Real Life's "Send Me an Angel" (May 1983), Black Sorrows' Hold On To Me (September 1988), Ross Wilson, Billy Thorpe, Brian Cadd and Kate Ceberano. She was one of the backing vocalists on Kylie Minogue's Enjoy Yourself Tour in 1990. As a result, she performed with Yoko Ono for the John Lennon tribute concert in Liverpool. She returned to Australia to support Olivia Newton-John and Tom Jones on the Australian legs of their tours. She again worked with Minogue in 1998 on the singer's Intimate and Live Tour of Australia. Other international artists she has supported include Ray Charles, Cyndi Lauper, Lenny Kravitz, Bryan Adams and Sting.

Edwards continues to perform, both as a solo artist, a member of Farnham's band and as a backing singer. She was part of the "Tour of Duty" concert for the Australian Army troops in appreciation of the peacekeeping effort in East Timor. She is an Australia Day ambassador for the state of Victoria.

== Discography ==
=== Studio albums ===
List of albums, with selected chart positions
Title	Album details	Peak chart positions
Title	Album details	AUS
Thru the Hoop	Released: May 1993; Format: CD; Label: Emerald City/Polydor	120
State of the Heart (Lisa Edwards with Phil Turcio)	Released: August 2005; Format: CD; Label: Warner (5046798622)	204
I’m Still the Woman	Released: 28 May 2021; Format: CD, Digital download, streaming; Label: Fanfare Records (FANFARE414); Producer: Michael Cristiano	-

=== Singles ===
List of singles, with selected chart positions
Year	Title	Peak chart positions	Certification	Album
Year	Title	AUS	Certification	Album
1981	"Power" (from 'Centrespread')	-		non album single
1985	"You Are My Melbourne" (Lisa Edwards and Adrian Campbell)	-		non album single
1992	"Cry"	5	AUS: Gold	Thru the Hoop
1992	"So Dangerous"	106		Thru the Hoop
1993	"Until the Day"	86		Thru the Hoop
1993	"(I Can Just) Lose Myself in You"	106		Thru the Hoop

== Awards and nominations ==
=== ARIA Music Awards ===
The ARIA Music Awards is an annual awards ceremony that recognises excellence, innovation, and achievement across all genres of Australian music. They commenced in 1987.

Year	Nominee / work	Award	Result	Ref.
1992	Paul Goldman for "Cry" by Lisa Edwards	Best Video	Nominated	
1992	Doug Brady for "Cry" & "So Dangerous" by Lisa Edwards	Engineer of the Year	Nominated	
