= The Spirit of Christmas 2004 =

Compilation album by various artists
- Released: 13 November 2004
- Recorded: 2004
- Genre: Christmas
- Label: Myer Grace Bros., Sony BMG
- Producer: Lindsay Field, Glenn Wheatley

The Spirit of Christmas chronology
The Spirit of Christmas 2003 (2003)	The Spirit of Christmas 2004 (2004)	The Spirit of Christmas 2005 (2005)

The Spirit of Christmas 2004 is the 11th compilation album of Christmas-associated tracks in the annual Spirit of Christmas series. It was released in Australia on 13 November 2004 with proceeds going to The Salvation Army's Red Shield Appeal, which supports at-risk children and youth throughout the country. The compilation has contributions from various Australian artists and was produced by Lindsay Field (also compiler) and Glenn Wheatley. It was issued on CD by Myer Grace Bros. and distributed by Sony BMG.

== Background ==
The Spirit of Christmas series started in 1993 when Myer, an Australian department store, wished to continue their philanthropic support in the community, "whilst at the same time providing something special for everyone to enjoy". They choose The Salvation Army's Red Shield Appeal for at-risk children and youth throughout the country as the recipients in 2004. The charity's John Dalzeil specified that funds would go to "special projects in each state such as a free camp in Western Australia for youth who can't afford school excursions or camps". Since 1993 the series had raised more than A$4.75 million for the charity. Session and touring musician, Lindsay Field was the executive producer and compiler. Field contacted various fellow Australian musicians – including those he had worked with personally – to donate a track for the compilation, most commonly a new rendition of a standard Christmas carol. Together with Glenn Wheatley (former member of The Masters Apprentices and manager of Little River Band), Field produced the recording for Myer Grace Bros. own label which was distributed by Sony BMG.

== Track listing ==
1. "Silent Night" – Christine Anu
2. "The Christmas Song" – Guy Sebastian
3. "Happy Xmas (War Is Over)" – george
4. "Christmas (Baby Please Come Home)" – Jon Stevens
5. "O Holy Night" – Cosima De Vito
6. "Too Fat for the Chimney" – Deborah Conway and Willy Zygier
7. "Mary’s Boy Child" – James Reyne
8. "Santa Claus Is Coming to Town" – Stephanie McIntosh
9. "Let’s Make a Baby King" – Troy Cassar-Daley
10. "We Wish You a Merry Christmas" – James Morrison
11. "Six White Boomers" – Russell Coight
12. "Away in a Manger" – Sara Storer
13. "I Saw Mummy Kissing Santa Claus" – The Rudolphs

== See also ==
- The Spirit of Christmas
- 2004 in music
