= Beautifully Wrong =

Beautifully Wrong – The Lost Songs

Studio album by Bachelor Girl
- Released: 12 August 2011
- Recorded: 2002–2003
- Genre: Pop
- Label: Sony Music Australia

Bachelor Girl chronology
Loved & Lost: The Best of Bachelor Girl (2011)	Beautifully Wrong – The Lost Songs (2011)	Waiting for the Day: Artist Sessions (2026)

Beautifully Wrong – The Lost Songs is the third studio album by Australian pop duo, Bachelor Girl. The album was recorded between 2002 and 2003 but remained unreleased until 2011.

Doko explained "Beautifully Wrong was the third album that was supposed to come out in 2003, but never got released." The album was nearly finished when their record company at the time, BMG, merged globally with Sony Music. In the corporate shakeout many artists' recording contracts were dissolved including Bachelor Girl's. The band amicably split in 2004 and reformed in 2011.

The album was only available for purchase during their Loved and Lost reunion tour across Australia in May and June 2011. Sony Music Australia released the album digitally only in August 2011.

== Track listing ==
1. "Validation" – 3:59
2. "Come Another Day – 4:02
3. "Beautifully Wrong" – 4:45
4. "Unborn" – 5:24
5. "You Again" – 4:41
6. "Distractified" – 4:13
7. "Don't Speak Child" – 5:51
8. "Funny Thing" – 4:53
9. "Approval Junkie" – 3:42
10. "Elated" – 4:29
11. "Forget" – 4:14

== Release history ==
Release history for Beautifully Wrong
Region	Date	Label	Format	Catalogue
Australia	12 August 2011	Sony Music Australia	Digital download	
