= The Spirit of Christmas 1993 =

The Spirit of Christmas

Compilation album by various artists
- Released: November 1993
- Recorded: 1993
- Genre: Christmas
- Length: 50:36
- Label: Emerald City, Polydor, Sony BMG
- Producer: Lindsay Field, Glenn Wheatley

The Spirit of Christmas chronology
| The Spirit of Christmas (1993) | The Spirit of Christmas '94 (1994) |

The Spirit of Christmas (later referred to as The Spirit of Christmas 1993) is the first compilation album of Christmas-associated tracks in the annual Spirit of Christmas series. It was released in Australia in November 1993 with proceeds going to the Red Shield Appeal by the Salvation Army for at-risk children and youth throughout the country. The compilation has contributions from various Australian artists and was produced by Lindsay Field (also compiler) and Glenn Wheatley. It was issued on cassette and CD by Emerald City and distributed by Polydor Records.

== Background ==
The Spirit of Christmas series started when Myer, an Australian department store, wished to continue their philanthropic support in the community, "whilst at the same time providing something special for everyone to enjoy". They choose the Salvation Army's Red Shield Appeal for at-risk children and youth throughout the country as the first recipients. Session and touring musician, Lindsay Field was appointed the executive producer and compiler. Field contacted various fellow Australian musicians – including those he had worked with personally – to donate a track for the compilation, most commonly a new rendition of a standard Christmas carol. Together with Glenn Wheatley (former member of The Masters Apprentices and manager of Little River Band), Field produced the recording for the Emerald City label which was distributed by Polydor Records.

== Track listing ==
1. "Born Again" – Ross Wilson and the Salvation Army Band – 3:28
2. "The Little Drummer Boy" – Southern Sons – 4:36
3. "Do You Hear What I Hear" – Lisa Edwards – 3:35
4. "Nothing But a Child" – James Blundell – 4:11
5. "If Santa Forgets" – Jimmy Barnes and The Tin Lids – 3:51
6. "Imagine" – Kate Ceberano – 4:07
7. "O Come, All Ye Faithful" – Glenn Shorrock and Brian Cadd – 4:06
8. "You'll Never Walk Alone" – John Farnham – 3:24
9. "Silent Night" – Wendy Matthews – 3:59
10. "Celebrate Like a Child" – Girlfriend – 4:17
11. "Santa Claus Is Back in Town" – James Reyne – 2:35
12. "Mary's Boy Child" – Venetta Fields and Lindsay Field – 2:57
13. "The Year of Indigenous People" – Yothu Yindi – 5:30

== See also ==
- The Spirit of Christmas (compilation album)
- 1993 in music
