= Bachelor Girl =

Australian pop duo

- Origin: Melbourne, Victoria, Australia
- Genres: Pop, pop rock, indie
- Years active: 1992–2003, 2011, 2018–present
- Labels: Gotham, BMG, Arista
- Members: Tania Doko; James Roche
- Website: bachelorgirl.com

Bachelor Girl are an Australian pop duo, formed in 1992 by Tania Doko as vocalist and James Roche as musician, producer and arranger. Their 1998 debut single, "Buses and Trains", was a top-10 hit in Australia and New Zealand; it peaked in the top 30 in Sweden and charted in the UK. The follow-up single, "Treat Me Good", reached the top 40 in Australia and New Zealand. Their debut studio album, Waiting for the Day, was released in 1998 and reached the top 20 on the ARIA Albums Chart and achieved platinum certification. Worldwide, Bachelor Girl has sold more than 500,000 albums and singles.

== History ==
=== 1992–1997: Formation ===
Bachelor Girl formed in December 1992 when songwriter and record producer, James Roche, met vocalist Tania Doko. Roche had previously worked, on keyboards or producing, with Tommy Emmanuel, John Farnham and Jack Jones (aka Irwin Thomas). Doko was a classically trained university student. Roche was crafting a demonstration tape of a song he had written for an Australian girl group, Girlfriend, and when the original singer cancelled, he recruited Doko. They began writing songs and recording other demos together. In December 1997, Bachelor Girl signed with Gotham Records, distributed by BMG, after being rejected by Sony.

=== 1998–2001: Waiting for the Day ===
Bachelor Girl's debut single, "Buses and Trains", was released on 18 June 1998. The song peaked at No. 4 on the ARIA Singles Chart and No. 6 on the New Zealand Singles Chart. In 1999, it appeared in the top 30 on the Swedish Singles Chart and reached the top 100 in the UK. Their second single, "Treat Me Good", was issued in November 1998 and reached the top 40 in Australia and New Zealand. The related album, Waiting for the Day, was released in November and peaked at No. 20 on the ARIA Albums Chart. In May 1999, their third single, "Lucky Me" reached the top 50 in Australia and New Zealand. It reached the top 20 on the Finnish Singles Chart. In August, the album was issued internationally as Breaking Through from Down Under on Arista Records. They performed the traditional Australian song "Waltzing Matilda" at the 2000 AFL Grand Final.

=== 2002–2004: Dysfunctional and split ===
In July 2002, Bachelor Girl released "I'm Just A Girl" as the lead single from their forthcoming second studio album. The song reached the Australian top 30. Their second album, Dysfunctional, was released in August and peaked in the top 30. "Drowning Not Waving" was released in October 2002 as the second and final single from the album.

The band recorded their third studio album in 2003–2004 but was never released as the duo amicably split in 2004.

=== 2004–2017: Hiatus, Loved & Lost: The Best of Bachelor Girl and Beautifully Wrong – The Lost Songs ===
In April 2011, a compilation album, Loved & Lost: The Best of Bachelor Girl, was released by Sony Music Australia. It featured four tracks abandoned from the third studio album. Doko stated in interviews that the band did not feel there was enough material from their two albums to fill a greatest hits album, and they decided to use cuts from the unreleased third studio album. In May and June, Bachelor Girl performed three gigs to promote the album. In August 2011, the previously unreleased third album was released digitally, titled Beautifully Wrong – The Lost Songs.

In 2012, Doko moved to Sweden where she worked as a singer/songwriter and vocal coach. Roche worked with a number of Australian musicians, including producing Anthony Callea's number one album, Backbone in 2016.

=== 2017–2023: Reformation, "Speak" and "Calling Out Your Name" ===
In mid-2017, Roche completed a three-week trip to Stockholm, Sweden, where he met up with Doko. The duo wrote and recorded with various Swedish writers and producers. Roche said, "I had a fantastic time; the context there of musical creation and endeavour is inspiring and energising. I've returned with a collection of songs I am so excited about - I can't wait to complete the production on them!". "Speak" was released on 18 June 2018, exactly 20 years since the release of "Buses and Trains".

In February 2023, Bachelor Girl released "Calling Out Your Name".

=== 2025–present: Waiting for the Day: Artist Sessions ===
In August 2026, Bachelor Girl released Waiting for the Day: Artist Sessions featuring collaborators across its 15 tracks, re-recording songs from Waiting for the Day.

== Discography ==
=== Albums ===
Title	Details	Chart positions	Sales and certifications
Title	Details	AUS	Sales and certifications
Waiting for the Day	Released: 9 November 1998; Label: Gotham (GOTH98092); Format: CD	20	ARIA: Platinum
Dysfunctional	Released: 5 August 2002; Label: Gotham (GOTH02062); Format: CD	28	AUS: 50,000
Beautifully Wrong	Released: 12 August 2011; Label: Sony Music Australia; Format: Digital download	—	
Waiting for the Day: Artist Sessions	Released: 7 August 2026; Label: Band on a Bus; Format: CD, digital download, streaming	34	
"—" denotes release that did not chart or was not released in that country

=== Compilations ===
Title	Album details
Loved & Lost: The Best of Bachelor Girl	Released: 14 April 2011; Label: Sony Music Australia (88697764362); Format: CD, digital download

=== Singles ===
Year	Song	Peak chart positions					Album
Year	Song	AUS	FIN	NZ	SWE	UK	Album
1998	"Buses and Trains"	4	—	6	29	65	Waiting for the Day
1998	"Treat Me Good"	34	—	26	—	—	Waiting for the Day
1999	"Lucky Me"	42	19	40	—	—	Waiting for the Day
1999	"Blown Away"	79	—	—	—	—	Waiting for the Day
2002	"I'm Just a Girl"	25	—	—	—	—	Dysfunctional
2002	"Drowning Not Waving"	69	—	—	—	—	Dysfunctional
2018	"Speak"	—	—	—	—	—	Non-album singles
2023	"Calling Out Your Name"	—	—	—	—	—	Non-album singles
2026	"Treat Me Good" (featuring Jessica Mauboy)	—	—	—	—	—	Waiting for the Day: Artist Sessions
2026	"Blind" (featuring Darren Hayes)	—	—	—	—	—	Waiting for the Day: Artist Sessions
2026	"Blown Away" (featuring Tommy Emmanuel and Ella Hooper)	—	—	—	—	—	Waiting for the Day: Artist Sessions
2026	"Permission to Shine" (featuring Guy Sebastian)	—	—	—	—	—	Waiting for the Day: Artist Sessions

=== Other appearances ===
Year	Title	Album
1999	"Come Undone"	UnDone the songs of Duran Duran
1999	"New Miracle"	The Spirit of Christmas 1999
1999	"Buses And Trains" (acoustic version)	Music Live from The Panel
2000	"Christmas Gives Me The Chance"	The Spirit of Christmas 2000
2002	"I'm Just A Girl" (acoustic version)	The Latest Collection: Music Live from The Panel
2003	"God Rest Ye Merry Gentlemen"	The Spirit of Christmas 2003

== Awards and nominations ==
=== ARIA Awards ===
The ARIA Music Awards is an annual awards ceremony that recognises excellence, innovation, and achievement across all genres of Australian music. Bachelor Girl have won 1 award from 5 nominations.

Year	Nominee / work	Award	Result
1998	"Buses and Trains"	Best New Talent	Nominated
1999	"Buses and Trains"	Highest Selling Single	Nominated
1999	Waiting for the Day	Breakthrough Artist - Album	Nominated
1999	Waiting for the Day	Best Pop Release	Nominated
1999	Bachelor Girl for Waiting for the Day	Producer of the Year	Won

=== APRA Awards ===
The APRA Awards are held in Australia and New Zealand by the Australasian Performing Right Association to recognise songwriting skills, sales and airplay performance by its members annually. Bachelor Girls have been nominated for three awards.

Year	Nominee / work	Award	Result
1999	"Buses and Trains"	Song of the Year	Won
1999	"Buses and Trains"	Most Performed Australian Work	Nominated
2000	"Lucky Me"	Most Played Australian Work	Nominated

=== Australian Women in Music Awards ===
The Australian Women in Music Awards (AWMA) is an annual event that celebrates outstanding women in the Australian Music Industry who have made significant and lasting contributions in their chosen field. They commenced in 2018.

Year	Nominee / work	Award	Result
2021	Tania Doko	Songwriter Award	Won
