= The Spirit of Christmas 1994 =

The Spirit of Christmas '94

Compilation album by various artists
- Released: November 1994
- Recorded: 1994
- Genre: Christmas
- Length: 70:07
- Label: Emerald City, Polydor, Sony BMG
- Producer: Lindsay Field, Glenn Wheatley

The Spirit of Christmas chronology
The Spirit of Christmas 1993 (1993)	The Spirit of Christmas '94 (1994)	The Spirit of Christmas 1995 (1995)

The Spirit of Christmas '94 (later referred to as The Spirit of Christmas 1994) is the second compilation album of Christmas-associated tracks in the annual Spirit of Christmas series. It was released in Australia in November 1994 with proceeds going to the Red Shield Appeal by the Salvation Army for at-risk children and youth throughout the country. The compilation has contributions from various Australian artists and was produced by Lindsay Field (also compiler) and Glenn Wheatley. It was issued on cassette and CD by Emerald City and distributed by Polydor Records.

== Background ==
The Spirit of Christmas series started in 1993 when Myer, an Australian department store, wished to continue their philanthropic support in the community, "whilst at the same time providing something special for everyone to enjoy". They choose the Salvation Army's Red Shield Appeal for at-risk children and youth throughout the country as the first recipients. Session and touring musician, Lindsay Field was appointed the executive producer and compiler. Field contacted various fellow Australian musicians – including those he had worked with personally – to donate a track for the compilation, most commonly a new rendition of a standard Christmas carol. Together with Glenn Wheatley (former member of The Masters Apprentices and manager of Little River Band), Field produced the recording for the Emerald City label which was distributed by Polydor Records. For this compilation Field personally contributed to three tracks.

== Track listing ==
1. "Away in a Manger" – Olivia Newton-John – 2:35
2. "I'll Be Home for Christmas" – Lisa Edwards and Lindsay Field – 4:15
3. "Hark the Herald Angels Sing" – Judith Durham – 2:52
4. "Amazing Grace" – John Farnham, Venetta Fields, Lisa Edwards and Lindsay Field – 3:36
5. "White Christmas" – Tommy Emmanuel – 3:38
6. "We Wish You a Merry Christmas" – James Morrison and Glenn Shorrock – 3:19
7. "The First Noel" – Tina Arena and Rick Price – 5:44
8. "When a Child Is Born" – Marina Prior – 3:30
9. "Children of the World" – Kate Ceberano and Jean-Paul Wabotai – 5:53
10. "God Rest Ye Merry Gentlemen" / "Good King Wenceslas" – Jack Jones – 6:13
11. "Silent Night" – Venetta Fields and Lindsay Field – 4:18
12. "My Sweet Lord" – Marcia Hines – 4:20
13. "O Holy Night" – Chocolate Starfish – 3:27
14. "Merry Christmas Baby" – Stephen Cummings – 3:08
15. "God Bless the Child" – Grace Knight – 5:21
16. "Christmas Must Be Tonight" – James Blundell – 3:46
17. "Have Yourself a Merry Little Christmas" – Billy Thorpe & the Aztecs – 4:12

== See also ==
- The Spirit of Christmas (compilation album)
- 1994 in music
