= The Spirit of Christmas 2002 =

Compilation album by various artists
- Released: November 2002
- Recorded: 2002
- Genre: Christmas
- Length: 49:41
- Label: Myer Grace Bros., Sony BMG
- Producer: Lindsay Field, Glenn Wheatley

The Spirit of Christmas chronology
The Spirit of Christmas 2001 (2001)	The Spirit of Christmas 2002 (2002)	The Spirit of Christmas 2003 (2003)

The Spirit of Christmas 2002 is the eighth compilation album of Christmas-associated tracks in the annual Spirit of Christmas series. It was released in Australia in November 2002 with proceeds going to The Salvation Army's Red Shield Appeal, which supports at-risk children and youth throughout the country. The compilation has contributions from various Australian artists and was produced by Lindsay Field (also compiler) and Glenn Wheatley. It was issued on cassette and CD by Myer Grace Bros. and distributed by Sony BMG.

== Background ==
The Spirit of Christmas series started in 1993 when Myer, an Australian department store, wished to continue their philanthropic support in the community, "whilst at the same time providing something special for everyone to enjoy". They choose the Salvation Army's Red Shield Appeal for at-risk children and youth throughout the country as the recipients in 2002. Session and touring musician, Lindsay Field was the executive producer and compiler. Field contacted various fellow Australian musicians – including those he had worked with personally – to donate a track for the compilation, most commonly a new rendition of a standard Christmas carol. Together with Glenn Wheatley (former member of The Masters Apprentices and manager of Little River Band), Field produced the recording for Myer Grace Bros. own label which was distributed by Sony BMG.

== Track listing ==
1. "Mary's Boy Child" – Human Nature – 2:40
2. "Do You Hear What I Hear?" – Delta Goodrem – 3:48
3. "O Holy Night" – Birtles Shorrock Goble – 3:40
4. "Grown Up Christmas List" – Julie Anthony – 3:25
5. "A Star Tonight" – Diesel – 3:25
6. "The Christmas Song" – John Farnham – 3:52
7. "Happy Xmas (War is Over)" – Invertigo – 3:29
8. "Last Christmas" – Nikki Webster – 4:20
9. "The Christmas Message" – Ernie Sigley – 3:53
10. "Silent Night" – Mark Seymour – 3:07
11. "The Little Drummer Boy" – Melinda Schneider – 3:00
12. "Have Yourself a Merry Little Christmas" – Renée Geyer – 2:57
13. "Please Come Home for Christmas" – Troy Cassar-Daley – 3:13
14. "The Twelve Days of Christmas" – Lisa Edwards and Lindsay Field – 4:52

== See also ==
- The Spirit of Christmas (compilation album)
- 2002 in music
