= The Spirit of Christmas =

The Spirit of Christmas may refer to:

== Film and television ==
- The Spirit of Christmas (short films), two versions of an animated short film created by South Park creators Trey Parker and Matt Stone in 1992 and 1995
- The Spirit of Christmas (TV program), television special from the 1950s, featuring the Mabel and Les Beaton marionettes
- "The Spirit of Christmas" (Casualty), a webisode of the BBC medical drama Casualty

== Music ==
- The Spirit of Christmas (compilation album), a series of Christmas albums in Australia
- The Spirit of Christmas (Chuck Brown album), a 1999 album
- The Spirit of Christmas (Michael W. Smith album), a 2014 album
- The Spirit of Christmas, a 1985 album by Ray Charles
