= HM Prison Beechworth =

Prison in Victoria, Australia 1864–2004

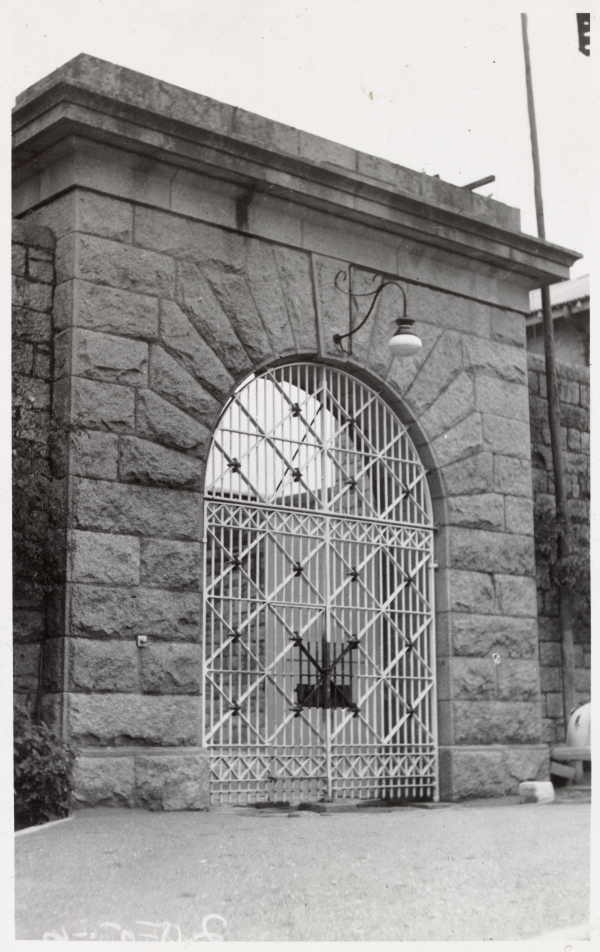
- The main gate of HM Prison Beechworth (1940).
- Interactive map of HM Prison Beechworth
- Location: Beechworth, Victoria; 36°21′28″S 146°41′24″E
- Capacity: 132
- Opened: 1864
- Closed: 2004
- Managed by: Corrections Victoria

HM Prison Beechworth, now known as Beechworth Gaol, was a medium security Australian prison located in Beechworth, Victoria, Australia.

Construction of the current structure was begun in 1859 and completed in 1864 at a cost of £47,000. The prison closed in 2004 and the site has been purchased by private developers. A replacement facility, the Beechworth Correctional Centre, was opened in January 2005.

== History ==
HM Prison Beechworth was built on the site of Beechworth's first stockade. It was designed by Victoria's Public Works Department and constructed using local granite that was quarried with prison labour. Beechworth was one of nine panopticon prisons built in Victoria.

Construction began in 1857 and the prison opened in 1860, though was incomplete and only had single cells for 36 prisoners. The capacity doubled when the building was completed in 1864. Beechworth initially housed male and female prisoners. Female prisoners were assigned washing and needlework for government departments. Between 1865 and 1881, eight executions were carried out at the prison. Ned Kelly served six months at the prison in 1870-71 for assault. He was again held there during his committal trial for murder in 1880. Kelly's mother, Ellen and two associates of the Kelly family also served sentences at the prison the late 1870s for the attempted murder of Constable Alexander Fitzpatrick. Twenty suspected sympathisers of Kelly were held in 1879 in an attempt to limit support to the Kelly gang. The prison's iron gates were installed due to fears there may be attempts to break the sympathisers out of the prison.

Between 1918 and 1925 the prison closed due to a lack of prisoners. It reopened as a reformatory for male recidivists between 1925 and 1951. In 1951 it became a training prison, focusing on rehabilitation and education. Beechworth Prison closed 2004.

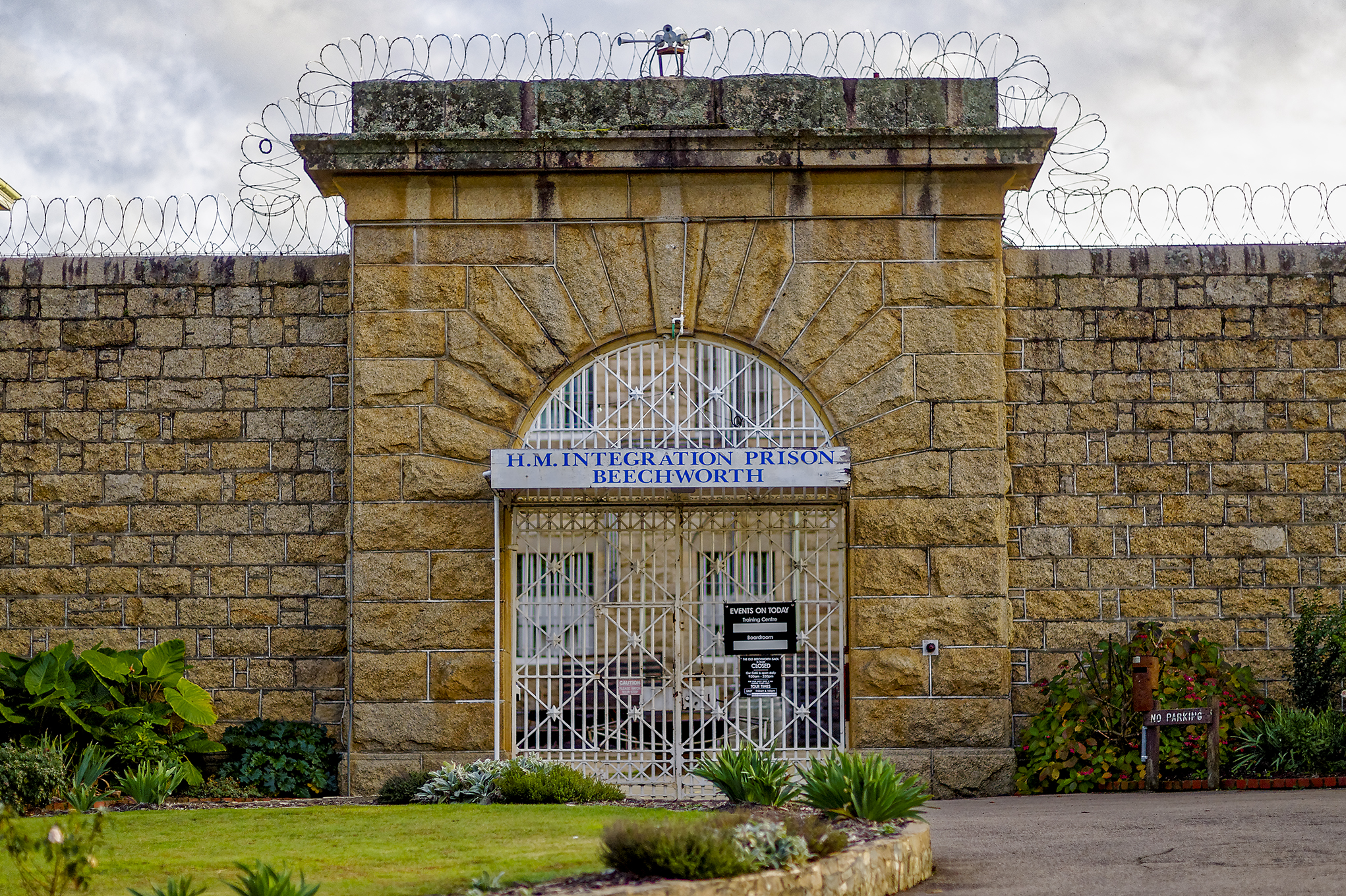
Main gates of HM Prison Beechworth 2022

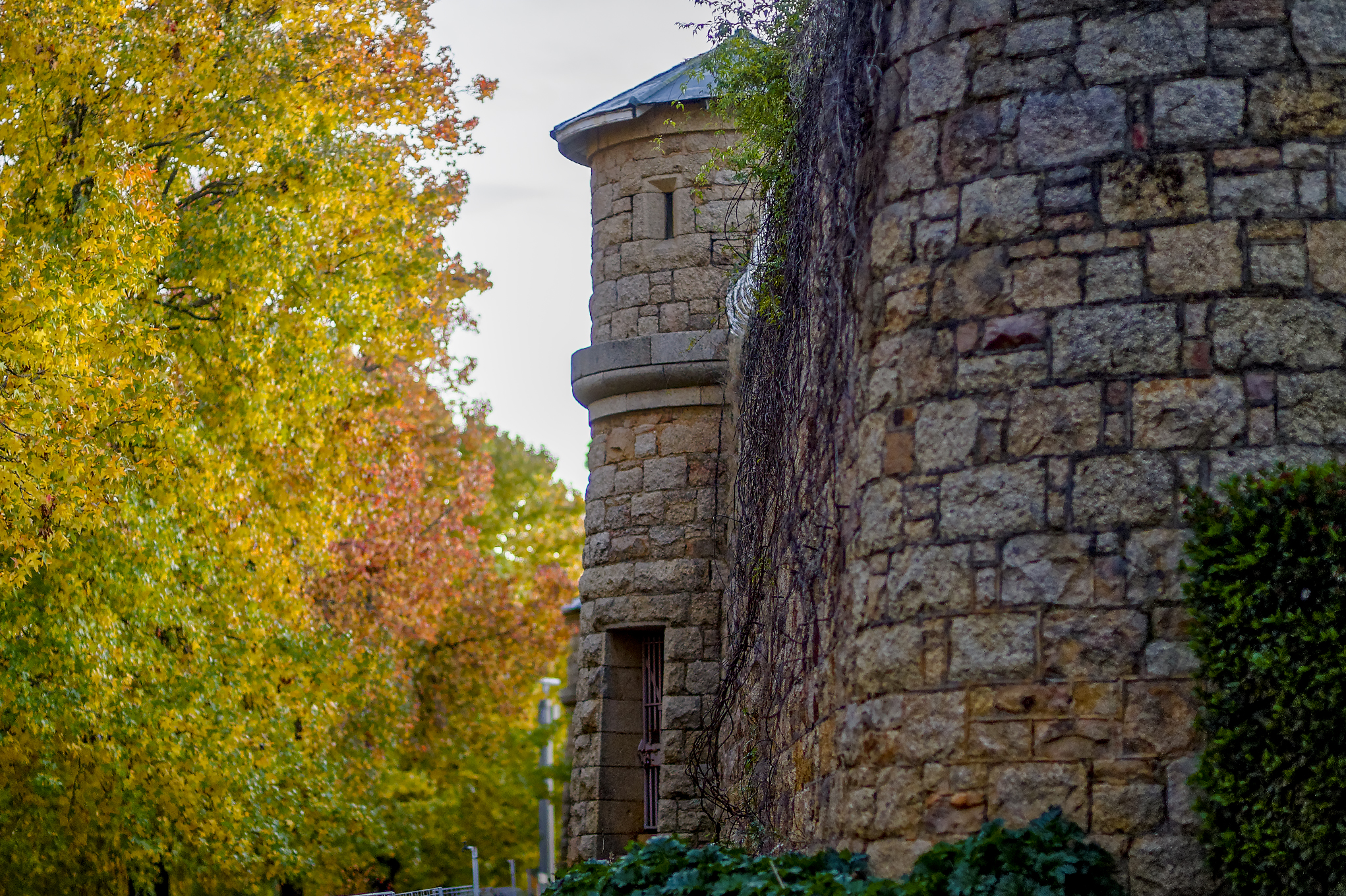
HM Prison Beechworth Guard Tower 2022 at sunrise

== Notable prisoners ==
- Joe Byrne
- Steve Hart
- Ned Kelly
- Aaron Sherritt

== Executions ==
Name	Date of execution	Crime
Patrick Sheehan	6 November 1865	Murder of James Kennedy at Rowdy Flat Yackandandah
John Kelly	4 May 1867	Sodomy on eighteen-month-old James Strack at Wangaratta
James Smith	11 November 1869	Murder of his wife Elizabeth Wheelahan near Springhurst
James Quinn	4 November 1871	Murder of Ah Woo, near Myrtleford
James Smith	12 May 1873	Murder of John Watt ("The Wooragee Murder")
Thomas Brady	12 May 1873	Murder of John Watt ("The Wooragee Murder")
Thomas Hogan	10 June 1879	Manslaughter - shot his own brother
Robert Rohan	6 June 1881	Murder of John Shea at Yalca
