= Dysfunctional (Bachelor Girl album) =

Studio album by Bachelor Girl
- Released: 5 August 2002
- Genre: Pop
- Label: Gotham

Bachelor Girl chronology
Waiting for the Day (1998)	Dysfunctional (2002)	Loved & Lost: The Best of Bachelor Girl (2011)

Singles from Dysfunctional
- 1. "I'm Just a Girl" Released: July 2002; 2. "Drowning Not Waving" Released: October 2002

"Dysfunctional" is the second studio album by Australian band Bachelor Girl, released in Australia through Gotham Records on 5 August 2002 (see 2002 in music).

== Track listing ==
1. "I'm Just a Girl" (James Roche)
2. "Drowning Not Waving" (Roche)
3. "Rollercoaster" (Phil Thornalley, M. Lewis)
4. "Walking with Shoes on Fire" (Roche, Tanya Doko)
5. "Can't Wait to Meet You" (Roche, Doko)
6. "Shaping My Universe" (Roche, Doko)
7. "Why Wait?" (Roche)
8. "I Am Myself" (Roche, Doko)
9. "Falling" (Roche, Doko)
10. "Nothing at All" (Roche, Doko)
11. "Last Thing" (Roche, Doko)
12. "Drowning, Not Waving" (remix; hidden track following "Last Thing")

== Charts ==
Chart (2002)	Peak position
Australian Albums (ARIA)	28

== Release history ==
Region	Date	Label	Format	Catalogue
Australia	5 August 2002	Gotham Records	CD	GOTH02062
