= I'm Just a Girl (Bachelor Girl song) =

2002 single by Bachelor Girl

Single by Bachelor Girl

from the album Dysfunctional
- B-side: "Falling"
- Released: 1 July 2002
- Length: 3:54
- Label: Gotham
- Songwriter: James Roche
- Producer: Bachelor Girl

Bachelor Girl singles chronology
"Blown Away" (1998)	"I'm Just a Girl" (2002)	"Drowning Not Waving" (2002)

"I'm Just a Girl" is a song by Australian pop music duo Bachelor Girl. The song was released on 1 July 2002 as the lead single from their second studio album, Dysfunctional (2002). The song peaked at number 25 on the Australian ARIA Singles Chart.

== Music video ==
The music video was shot on location at the Ansett Australia Melbourne Airport Terminal, in Melbourne, Australia, not long after the airline had ceased operations in 2002. An Ansett aircraft as well as the deserted gate lounges, arrivals hall and Golden Wing Club Lounge served as the backdrop for the video. Twenty former Ansett staff participated as extras in the shoot, which took two days to film.

== Track listing ==
Australian CD single

1. "I'm Just a Girl" – 3:54
2. "I'm Just a Girl" (Matrixectomy mix) – 3:27
3. "I'm Just a Girl" (JR's Groovedog mix) – 12:43
4. "Falling" – 4:26
5. "I'm Just a Girl" (video)

== Charts ==
Chart (2002)	Peak position
Australia (ARIA)	25

== Release history ==
Region	Release date	Format	Label	Catalogue	Ref.
Australia	1 July 2002	CD	Gotham	GOTH02022	
