= Drowning Not Waving =

- CD remix single cover

Single by Bachelor Girl

from the album Dysfunctional
- Released: October 2002
- Genre: pop
- Length: 4:36
- Label: Gotham
- Songwriter: James Roche
- Producer: Bachelor Girl

Bachelor Girl singles chronology
"I'm Just a Girl" (2002)	"Drowning Not Waving" (2002)	"Speak" (2018)

"Drowning Not Waving" is a song by Australian pop group Bachelor Girl. The song was released in October 2002 as the second and final single from the group's second studio album, Dysfunctional (2002). The song peaked at number 69 on the ARIA Charts.

== Track listing ==
CD Single

1. "Drowning Not Waving" - 4:36
2. "Drowning Not Waving" (Jack remix) - 3:51
3. "Guilt Trip" - 3:40

CD Single (remixes)

1. "Drowning Not Waving" (The K Man remix)
2. "Drowning Not Waving" (Tidal Chaos mix

== Charts ==
Chart (2002)	Position
Australian (ARIA Charts)	69

== Release history ==
Country	Release date	Format	Label	Catalogue
Australia	October 2002	CD Single	Gotham /BMG	GOTH02102
Australia	October 2002	CD Single (Remixes)	Gotham /BMG	GOTH21275
