= The Spirit of Christmas 2003 =

Compilation album by various artists
- Released: November 2003
- Recorded: 2003
- Genre: Christmas
- Label: Myer Grace Bros., Sony BMG
- Producer: Lindsay Field, Glenn Wheatley

The Spirit of Christmas chronology
The Spirit of Christmas 2002 (2002)	The Spirit of Christmas 2003 (2003)	The Spirit of Christmas 2004 (2004)

The Spirit of Christmas 2003 is the tenth compilation album of Christmas-associated tracks in the annual Spirit of Christmas series. It was released in Australia in mid-November 2003 with proceeds going to The Salvation Army's Red Shield Appeal, which supports at-risk children and youth throughout the country. The compilation has contributions from various Australian artists and was produced by Lindsay Field (also compiler) and Glenn Wheatley. It was issued on CD by Myer Grace Bros. and distributed by Sony BMG.

== Background ==
The Spirit of Christmas series started in 1993 when Myer, an Australian department store, wished to continue their philanthropic support in the community, "whilst at the same time providing something special for everyone to enjoy". They choose The Salvation Army's Red Shield Appeal for at-risk children and youth throughout the country as the recipients in 2003. Since 1993 the series had raised more than A$4 million for the charity. Session and touring musician, Lindsay Field was the executive producer and compiler. Field contacted various fellow Australian musicians – including those he had worked with personally – to donate a track for the compilation, most commonly a new rendition of a standard Christmas carol. Together with Glenn Wheatley (former member of The Masters Apprentices and manager of Little River Band), Field produced the recording for Myer Grace Bros. own label which was distributed by Sony BMG.

== Track listing ==
1. "Have Yourself a Merry Little Christmas" – Delta Goodrem
2. "Mary's Boy Child" – Lee Kernaghan
3. "O Holy Night" – Mercury4
4. "Love's in Need of Love Today" – John Farnham
5. "The Man with the Bag" – The Rudolphs featuring Dannielle Gaha
6. "God Rest Ye Merry, Gentlemen" – Bachelor Girl
7. "Wish You Were Here" – Melinda Schneider
8. "Silver Bells" – Olivia Newton-John featuring the London Symphony Orchestra
9. "I'll Be Home for Christmas" – Kate Ceberano
10. "Santa Claus Is Coming to Town" – David Campbell
11. "Christmas Medley" – Stuart Fraser and Brett Garsed
12. "And the World Is One on a Christmas Morning" – The Wiggles
13. "The Spirit of Christmas" – Ross Wilson
14. "The Twelve Days of Christmas" – Australian Girls Choir
15. "We Wish You a Merry Christmas" – Judith Durham and The Seekers

== See also ==
- The Spirit of Christmas
- 2003 in music
