= The Spirit of Christmas 2008 =

Compilation album by Various artists
- Released: 2008
- Recorded: 2008
- Genre: Christmas
- Label: TBA
- Producer: Lindsay Field & Glenn Wheatley

The Spirit of Christmas chronology
The Spirit of Christmas 2007 (2007)	The Spirit of Christmas 2008 (2008)	The Spirit of Christmas 2009 (2009)

The Spirit of Christmas 2008 is part of the Spirit of Christmas album series.

== Track listing ==
Myer Grace Bros (Australian department store chain)

1. Have Yourself a Merry Little Christmas - Ricki Lee
2. Santa Baby - Kate Ceberano
3. Nothing But a Child - Kasey Chambers & Shane Nicholson
4. Silent Night - Archie Roach
5. This Christmas - Damien Leith
6. O Holy Night - Olivia Newton-John
7. It's Beginning To Look A Lot Like Christmas - Carl Riseley
8. The Christmas Song - Katie Noonan
9. The Rebel Jesus - Glenn Shorrock
10. Christmas (Baby Please Come Home) - Mahalia Barnes & The Soul Mates
11. All I Want for Christmas Is You - Dean Geyer
12. 2000 Miles - Paris Wells
13. The Twelve Days of Christmas - University Of Newcastle Chamber Choir
14. The Virgin Mary Had a Baby Boy - The Rudolphs
15. Hallelujah Chorus - The Sydney Salvos Staff Songsters
