= Beechworth Correctional Centre =

Prison in Victoria, Australia

Coordinates: 36°20′56.04″S 146°39′14.79″E

- Interactive map of Beechworth Correctional Centre
- Location: Beechworth, Victoria
- Capacity: 136
- Opened: 2005
- Managed by: Corrections Victoria

The Beechworth Correctional Centre is a minimum security prison, located in Beechworth, Victoria, Australia. It was opened in January 2005 as a replacement for the now-closed HM Prison Beechworth.

Accommodation in the prison is made up of several self-catered and fully catered units. Prisoners in self-catered units are given a weekly budget to buy groceries and cook their own meals. As of 2006, the budget was $27.00.

The prisoners work in a variety of areas, including landcare work, factory work, billet positions, and kitchen jobs, as well as several education options.

Like other minimum security prisons, the Beechworth Correctional Centre has a zero tolerance policy on drugs. Any prisoner who tests positive for drugs is moved into a punishment cell and moved to a higher security prison.

== Notable prisoners ==
- Glenn Wheatley – music entrepreneur, sentenced for tax evasion
