= Blown Away (Bachelor Girl song) =

- CD single cover

Single by Bachelor Girl

from the album Waiting for the Day
- Released: September 1999
- Genre: pop
- Length: 4:33
- Label: Gotham
- Songwriters: Scott Cutler, Anne Preven
- Producers: James Roche, Vlado Miller

Bachelor Girl singles chronology
"Lucky Me" (1999)	"Blown Away" (1999)	"I'm Just a Girl" (2002)

"Blown Away" is a song by Australian pop group Bachelor Girl. The song was released in September 1999 as the fourth and final single from the group's debut studio album, Waiting for the Day (1998). The song peaked at number 79 on the ARIA Charts.

== Track listing ==
CD Single

1. "Blown Away" - 4:33
2. "Buses and Trains" (Italian version) - 3:42

== Charts ==
Chart (1999)	Position
Australian (ARIA Charts)	79

== Release history ==
Country	Release date	Format	Label	Catalogue
Australia	27 September 1999	CD Single	Gotham /BMG	GOTH99042
