= The Spirit of Christmas (TV program) =

Christmas TV special

The Spirit of Christmas is a Christmas television special performed by marionettes. It was produced by Mabel and Les Beaton through their company, Stringtime Productions. Sources conflict regarding the special's debut date (1950 and 1953 are commonly cited), but advertisements and television listings for the special appeared in The Philadelphia Inquirer from December 21-23 of 1951.

== Summary ==
Its half-hour showing time is divided into two marionette segments, one dramatizing Clement Clarke Moore's 1823 poem "A Visit from St. Nicholas" and one telling the story of the Nativity. The live-action part of the film features Alexander Scourby, who narrates and also plays Clement Moore in the Visit from St. Nicholas segment. The jacket of the DVD version calls it "The Philadelphia Holiday Classic," referring to the region of the United States where it was originally broadcast. The jacket also describes it as a "50s TV Christmas classic, which has led it to being misdated as first being shown in 1950.

== Legacy ==
Into the 1960s, the special was aired multiple times per Christmas season, without commercial interruptions except for opening and closing remarks by "your telephone company" (Bell Telephone). It was also available as a 16mm film licensed to schools for showings to students.

It disappeared from the airwaves for several decades but began airing on public television again in 1998. It was unusual in that it was made in color, despite all television broadcasting at the time being in black-and-white.

RiffTrax spoofed the film on December 22, 2025.
