= The Spirit of Christmas (album series) =

Australian compilation album series

The Spirit of Christmas were a twenty-five year running series of compilation albums of both traditional and modern Christmas carols performed by Australian artists and musicians which was released every Christmas between 1993 until its discontinuation in 2018 with proceeds going to The Salvation Army in Australia as part of their "Red Shield Appeal" which supports at-risk children and youth throughout Australia. The albums were sponsored by Myer and produced by Emerald City records, a division of Polydor Records and later produced by Sony BMG. There was a brief intermission because of the death of Diana, Princess of Wales in 1997, and a tribute album featuring British and other international artists, was dedicated to her memory instead, titled Diana, Princess of Wales: Tribute.

== Founding ==
This initiative started when Myer wished to continue their philanthropic support in the community "whilst at the same time providing something special for everyone to enjoy." Since the release of the first edition of The Spirit of Christmas CD in 1993, over $5.5 million have been raised for the Salvation Army while funds raised from the 1996 and 1998 editions went to the Starlight Children's Foundation. Session and touring musician, Lindsay Field was the executive producer and compiler. Each year Field contacted various fellow Australian musicians – including those he had worked with personally – to donate a track for the compilation, most commonly a new rendition of a standard Christmas carol. In 1995 he reflected, "People get to hear top Aussie artists singing previously unrecorded tracks, and through buying a copy they can support the valuable work of The Salvation Army." In that year they raised over $240,000 for homeless youth programs. The albums were produced in collaboration with former musician and later talent manager Glenn Wheatley (ex-the Masters Apprentices, Little River Band, John Farnham). For The Spirit of Christmas 2003, two of Wheatley's artists (Farnham and Delta Goodrem) provided tracks,

== Discography ==
- The Spirit of Christmas 1993
- The Spirit of Christmas 1994
- The Spirit of Christmas 1995
- The Spirit of Christmas 1996
- The Spirit of Christmas 1998
- The Spirit of Christmas 1999
- The Spirit of Christmas 2000
- The Spirit of Christmas 2001
- The Spirit of Christmas 2002
- The Spirit of Christmas 2003
- The Spirit of Christmas 2004
- The Spirit of Christmas 2005
- The Spirit of Christmas 2006
- The Spirit of Christmas 2007
- The Spirit of Christmas 2008
- The Spirit of Christmas 2009
- The Spirit of Christmas 2010
- The Spirit of Christmas 2011
- The Spirit of Christmas 2012
- The Spirit of Christmas 2013 (20th Anniversary)
- The Spirit of Christmas 2014
- The Spirit of Christmas 2015 (Best of)
- The Spirit of Christmas 2016
- The Spirit of Christmas 2017 (Best of)
- The Spirit of Christmas 2018 (Celebrating 25 Joyous Years)
