= Lucky Me (Bachelor Girl song) =

- CD single cover

Single by Bachelor Girl

from the album Waiting for the Day
- B-side: "I Don't Believe You"
- Released: April 1999
- Length: 4:32
- Label: Gotham
- Songwriter: James Roche
- Producer: Bachelor Girl

Bachelor Girl singles chronology
"Treat Me Good" (1998)	"Lucky Me" (1999)	"Blown Away" (1999)

Music video
- "Lucky Me" on YouTube

"Lucky Me" is a song by Australian pop music duo Bachelor Girl. The song was released in April 1999 as the third single from the group's debut studio album, Waiting for the Day (1998). The song was written by the group's keyboardist, James Roche. The music video was filmed inside Glen Waverley Shopping Centre.

== Track listing ==
CD single

1. "Lucky Me" – 4:32
2. "I Don't Believe You" – 4:01
3. "Treat Me Good" – 4:31

== Charts ==
Chart (1999)	Peak position
Australia (ARIA)	42
Finland (Suomen virallinen lista)	19
New Zealand (Recorded Music NZ)	40

== Release history ==
Region	Release date	Format	Label	Catalogue
Australia	12 April 1999	CD single	Gotham	GOTH99012
