= Treat Me Good =

Single by Bachelor Girl

from the album Waiting for the Day
- Released: 5 October 1998
- Genre: Pop
- Length: 4:31
- Label: Gotham
- Songwriters: Tania Doko, Joanne McDonnell, James Roche
- Producer: Bachelor Girl

Bachelor Girl singles chronology
"Buses and Trains" (1998)	"Treat Me Good" (1998)	"Lucky Me" (1999)

"Treat Me Good" is a song written by Tania Doko, Joanne McDonnell and James Roche for Bachelor Girl's first album, Waiting for the Day (1998). It was released as the album's second single in Australia on 5 October 1998, as a CD single. The song was a minor hit, peaking in the top forty of the Australian ARIA Singles Chart, and reaching the top thirty in New Zealand.

== Track listing ==
CD single

1. "Treat Me Good" - 4:32
2. "Treat Me Good" (cyber mix) - 5:41
3. "Someway, Somehow" - 5:14
4. "Buses and Trains" (live) - 4:38

== Charts ==
Chart (1998/99)	Peak position
Australia (ARIA)	34
New Zealand (Recorded Music NZ)	26

== Release history ==
Country	Release date	Format	Label	Catalogue
Australia	5 October 1998	CD single	Gotham /BMG	GOTH98082
