= Waiting for the Day =

Studio album by Bachelor Girl
- Released: 9 November 1998
- Genre: Pop
- Label: Gotham

Bachelor Girl chronology
Waiting for the Day (1998)	Dysfunctional (2002)

Singles from Waiting for the Day
- 1. "Buses and Trains" Released: 18 June 1998; 2. "Treat Me Good" Released: October 1998; 3. "Lucky Me" Released: April 1999; 4. "Blown Away" Released: September 1999

Waiting for the Day is the debut studio album by Australian band Bachelor Girl. The album was released in Australia through Gotham Records on 9 November 1998 (see 1998 in music). The album charted in the top twenty on the Australian ARIA Albums Chart and was certified platinum.

The album yielded four singles; "Buses and Trains", "Treat Me Good", "Lucky Me" and "Blown Away" as well as one promotional single, "Permission to Shine".

At the ARIA Music Awards of 1999, the album won the ARIA Award for Producer of the Year as well as being nominated for Breakthrough Artist – Album and Best Pop Release.

It was released in the United States in 1999, under the title Breaking Through from Down Under with a slightly altered track listing.

== Critical reception ==
Heather Phares from AllMusic said "Bachelor Girl provide plenty of youthful, shiny dance-pop on their debut album. Songs like "Blown Away", "Buses and Trains" and "Treat Me Good" showcase Tania Doko's girlish yet powerful voice and James Roche's songwriting and production skills." calling it "A catchy, entertaining album"

== Commercial performance ==
Waiting for the Day was commercially successful in Australia, spending nine months in the top fifty and peaking in the top twenty on the Australian ARIA Albums Chart.

== Track listing ==
Australian version

1. "Buses and Trains" (James Roche) – 3:42
2. "Gotta Let You Go" (Tania Doko, Roche) – 5:41
3. "Treat Me Good" (Doko, Jimmy McDonnell, Roche) – 4:31
4. "This Must Be Love (Like It or Not)" (Doko, Roche) – 4:07
5. "Waiting for the Day" (Roche) – 4:07
6. "My World" (Doko, Randy Goodrum, Roche, N. Sloan) – 4:20
7. "You Are Afraid" (Roche) – 4:58
8. "Someway, Somehow" (Doko, Roche) – 5:14
9. "Blind" (Doko, Roche) – 4:11
10. "Don't Hold Back" (Michael O'Rourke, Roche) – 4:57
11. "I Don't Believe You" (Doko, Roche) – 3:59
12. "Mad About You" (Doko, Roche) – 5:06
- Japan edition
13. "Treat Me Good" (Cyber mix) – 5:40
- Australian re-issued edition
13. "Lucky Me" (Roche) – 4:31
14. "Permission to Shine" (Bridget Benenate) – 4:18
15. "Blown Away" (S. Cutler, A. Preven) – 4:36
16. "You Are Afraid" (remix)
17. "Blind" (remix)

US version – Breaking Through from Down Under (1999)

1. "Buses and Trains" – 3:41
2. "Blown Away" – 4:36
3. "Lucky Me" – 4:30
4. "Permission to Shine" – 4:16
5. "Treat Me Good" – 4:29
6. "Gotta Let You Go" – 5:25
7. "Waiting for the Day" – 5:06
8. "This Must Be Love (Like It or Not)" – 4:05
9. "You Are Afraid" – 4:56
10. "I Don't Believe You" – 3:58
11. "Someway, Somehow" – 4:20
12. "Mad About You" – 5:04

== Charts ==
=== Weekly charts ===
Weekly chart performance for Waiting for the Day
Chart (1998–2000)	Peak position
Australian Albums (ARIA)	20

=== Year-end charts ===
1998 year-end chart performance for Waiting for the Day
Chart (1998)	Position
Australian Albums (ARIA)	88

2000 year-end chart performance for Waiting for the Day
Chart (2000)	Position
Australian Albums (ARIA)	99

== Certifications ==
Certifications for Waiting for the Day
Region	Certification	Certified units/sales
Australia (ARIA)	Platinum	70,000^{^}
^{^} Shipments figures based on certification alone.

== Release history ==
Release history and formats for Waiting for the Day
Region	Date	Label	Format	Catalogue
Australia	9 November 1998	Gotham	CD	GOTH98052
Australia	3 May 1999	Gotham	CD	GOTH99032
Japan	25 March 1999	BMG Japan	CD	BVCP-21045
