= Buses and Trains =

1998 single by Bachelor Girl

- CD single cover

Single by Bachelor Girl

from the album Waiting for the Day
- B-side: "This Must Be Love"
- Released: 18 June 1998
- Length: 3:43
- Label: Gotham; BMG
- Songwriter: James Roche
- Producer: Bachelor Girl

Bachelor Girl singles chronology
"Buses and Trains" (1998)	"Treat Me Good" (1998)

Music video
- "Buses and Trains" on YouTube

"Buses and Trains" is a song by Australian pop duo Bachelor Girl. Released on 18 June 1998 as their debut single and as the lead single from their first album, Waiting for the Day (1998), the song peaked at number four on the Australian ARIA Singles Chart and remains the duo's highest-charting single. It was also a hit in New Zealand, where it reached number six and earned a gold certification. Outside Australia, "Buses and Trains" reached number 29 in Sweden, number 35 in Iceland, and number 65 in the United Kingdom.

At the APRA Music Awards of 1999, the song was nominated for Most Performed Australian Work and won Song of the Year. At the ARIA Music Awards of 1999, it was nominated for Highest Selling Single but lost to "Jackie" by BZ featuring Joanne.

== Music video ==
The video features Tania Doko recording a snapshot of her life to send to her mother. The entire video is viewed from the TV's point of perception, with Doko doing various things correlating with the lyrics in the song as she sings. The view occasionally turns to the side where James Roche can be seen playing an instrument. It ends with Doko ejecting the tape and writing 'Mum, For You' on an envelope before slipping the tape inside.

== Track listings ==
Australian and Japanese CD single

1. "Buses and Trains"
2. "This Must Be Love"
3. "Buses and Trains" (Roadside mix)

European CD single

1. "Buses and Trains" – 3:42
2. "This Must Be Love (Like It or Not)" – 4:02

== Charts ==
=== Weekly charts ===
Chart (1998–1999)	Peak position
Australia (ARIA)	4
Iceland (Íslenski Listinn Topp 40)	35
New Zealand (Recorded Music NZ)	6
Sweden (Sverigetopplistan)	29
UK Singles (Official Charts)	65

=== Year-end charts ===
Chart (1998)	Position
Australia (ARIA)	29

== Certifications ==
Region	Certification	Certified units/sales
Australia (ARIA)	Platinum	70,000^{^}
New Zealand (RMNZ)	Gold	5,000^{*}
^{*} Sales figures based on certification alone.^{^} Shipments figures based on certification alone.

== Release history ==
Region	Date	Format(s)	Label(s)	Catalogue	Ref(s).
Australia	18 June 1998	CD	Gotham; BMG Australia	GOTH98052	
Japan	6 March 1999	CD	BMG Japan	BVCP-29011	
United Kingdom	28 June 1999	CD; cassette	Gotham	74321635852; 74321662544	
United States	23 August 1999	Hot adult contemporary; modern adult contemporary radio	Arista	—N/a	
United States	24 August 1999	Contemporary hit radio	Arista	—N/a	
