= Starlight Children's Foundation =

American nonprofit organization

- Formation: 1982; 44 years ago
- Type: 501(c)(3)Nonprofit organization
- Purpose: Children's charity
- Headquarters: Los Angeles, California
- Region served: US (and independent international locations)
- CEO: Adam Garone
- Website: www.starlight.org starlightcanada.org starlight.org.uk starlight.org.au

The Starlight Children's Foundation is a nonprofit organization founded in 1982. Starlight's programs include providing hospital wear, games, and deliveries to hospitalized children.

The programs are provided directly for free to seriously, chronically, and terminally ill children and teenagers through Starlight's network of more than 800 children's hospitals and other community health partners throughout the world.

Starlight impacts over 3 million children a year.

Starlight's US operations are based in Los Angeles, California.

== Programs ==
The non-profit's programs aim to deliver happiness to seriously ill kids and include specially manufactured Starlight Nintendo Gaming Stations for hospital use, Disney Princess-themed hospital wear, and Starlight Radio Flyer Hero Wagons with an IV pole attachment. Real-life superhero Captain Starlight also entertains sick and ill kids in hospitals as well.

== History ==
Starlight Children's Foundation was founded in 1982 by filmmaker Peter Samuelson and actress Emma Samms, who was inspired by her 8-year-old brother's death from aplastic anemia. Steven Spielberg serves as the organization's chairman Emeritus. Starlight's current CEO is Adam Garone.

== Starbright World ==
Starbright World was the first-ever private social network, started in 1995 by filmmaker and chairman Emeritus Steven Spielberg, Peter Samuelson and Norman Schwarzkopf Jr. It served to connect chronically ill teenagers with life-threatening medical conditions, and their siblings, in a safe, online community where they could chat, blog, post content, and meet others who shared similar experiences. Starbright World was taken offline on August 31, 2015.
