= Glenn Wheatley =

Australian musician, manager, promoter and radio entrepreneur (1948–2022)

- Born: Glenn Dawson Wheatley; 23 January 1948; Nambour, Queensland, Australia
- Died: 1 February 2022 (aged 74); Melbourne, Victoria, Australia
- Occupations: Musician; talent manager; music promoter; radio entrepreneur
- Known for: Founder and managing director of "Talentworks"; the Masters Apprentices' bass guitarist; Manager of Little River Band, John Farnham and Delta Goodrem; Triple M Melbourne
- Criminal charges: Tax evasion
- Criminal penalty: 15 months
- Spouse: Gaynor Martin (m. 1982)
- Musical career
- Genre: Pop rock
- Instruments: Bass guitar, guitar
- Years active: 1968–2021
- Label: Wheatley
- Formerly of: The Masters Apprentices

Glenn Dawson Wheatley (23 January 1948 – 1 February 2022) was an Australian musician, talent manager, tour promoter and radio entrepreneur. Wheatley was the founder and managing director of Talentworks. He was the bass guitarist in the Australian rock band, the Masters Apprentices (1968–1972) and wrote a memoir, Paper Paradise (1999). In 1998 the Masters Apprentices, with Wheatley as a member. were inducted into the ARIA Hall of Fame. He managed Little River Band (1975–1987), John Farnham (1980–2022) and Delta Goodrem (1999–2003). The entrepreneur was convicted and jailed for tax evasion in 2007 and served both custodial and home detention totalling 15 months. Wheatley had married actress Gaynor Martin in 1982 and the couple have three children. Wheatley died from complications of COVID-19 in 2022, at the age of 74.

== Early years ==
Wheatley was born in 1948 and grew up in the Brisbane suburb of Stafford as the elder of two sons. He left school in 1962 to become an apprentice photo-lithographer. While at school he had formed Southtown Moods on guitar, which continued for two years during his apprenticeship. Wheatley worked as their "booking agent, a promoter, a public relations officer, a manager, a caterer, as well as playing in the band." He briefly joined local group, the Purple Hearts on rhythm guitar, but remained behind when they left for Melbourne in 1965.

== Career ==
Wheatley began his career as a musician in Brisbane in the mid-1960s. Later that decade, he became known nationally as the bass guitarist in the rock band, the Masters Apprentices. He subsequently formed a media empire which included radio stations and artist management.

Wheatley is best known as the long-time manager of John Farnham; he has been described as an "iconic industry figure" and is credited with launching the career of Delta Goodrem. He is also recognised as having established Little River Band in the United States.

In 1999 the Masters Apprentices, with Wheatley as a member, were inducted into the ARIA Hall of Fame. Wheatley a recipient of the Advance Australia Award for Outstanding Contribution in the Entertainment Industry, a Council Member for ScreenSound Australia.

== Musician ==
=== Bay City Union ===
Wheatley's first significant foray into music was as a rhythm guitarist in the Brisbane blues band Bay City Union. They were formed in March 1966 by Trevor Bagnall on bass guitar, Jimmy Brelsford on lead guitar, Paul Johnson on vocals, Peter Miles on drums (ex-the Purple Hearts) and Matt Taylor on rhythm guitar, vocals and harmonica. Wheatley joined in mid-1966 after Johnson left so Taylor could concentrate on lead vocals and harmonica. Early in the following year Brelsford left and they relocated to Melbourne, where Phil Manning joined on lead guitar. Bagnall left in December and Wheatley switched over to bass guitar. Bay City Union issued a single, their cover version of Paul Revere & the Raiders' "Mo'reen", in April 1968 and they disbanded in June due to lack of commercial interest. Manning and Taylor later achieved fame in Australia as members of the pioneering blues band, Chain.

=== The Masters Apprentices ===
In early 1968, Wheatley was hired as the bass player in a new line-up of the Melbourne-based version of pop-rock band the Masters Apprentices, then one of Australia's most popular groups. Wheatley's four-year tenure with the group, which lasted until shortly before their break-up in 1972, included the recording of many of their most successful songs, including the hit singles "Turn Up Your Radio" (1970) and "Because I Love You" (1971) as well as the 1971 album Choice Cuts, which was recorded at Abbey Road Studios in London.

It was during Wheatley's tenure in the Masters that he learned first hand about the highly exploitative nature of the Australian pop industry at that time. The band endured many "rip-offs" and in their later career they suffered greatly from poor management decisions and inadequate support from their record labels, problems which eventually led to the group's demise in 1972. According to Wheatley's memoir, a key incident took place in late 1969 when the Masters took part in a nationwide package tour, "Operation Starlift". The concert at Brisbane Festival Hall drew a then-record crowd of over 7,000 people, breaking the venue's previous attendance record set during the Beatles' Australian tour in 1964.

After the concert, Wheatley reflected on the event, with it becoming a turning point in his life and career - helping drive home just how badly the group were being exploited. Wheatley knew that patrons had paid $5 per ticket, so the receipts for the night would have been around $35,000, but The Masters Apprentices, like all the other acts, were on a fixed fee and received a mere $200 for the show; even the top-billed act, John Farnham, probably only earned about $1,000. Figuring that the performers were probably only paid about $2,000 in total, Wheatley realised that the promoters had walked away with upwards of $30,000 for that concert alone.

== Talent manager ==
With his brother Paul Wheatley, he set up Wheatley Brothers Entertainment, which handled Little River Band. Under Glenn Wheatley's management, he has the two highest selling Australian albums of all time - John Farnham's Whispering Jack (1986) and Delta Goodrem's Innocent Eyes (2003).

=== Little River Band ===
In late 1974, Beeb Birtles, Graham Goble and Derek Pellicci (ex-Mississippi) and Glenn Shorrock (ex-Axiom) met with Wheatley in London. With Wheatley as manager, they agreed to reconvene in Melbourne in early 1975. They decided their new band would establish itself in the United States. Wheatley's first-hand experiences of the rip-offs in the 1960s music scene, combined with working in music management in the UK and the US in the early 1970s, allowed him to help Little River Band become the first Australian group to enjoy consistent commercial and chart success in the US.

In May 1975, Little River Band signed with EMI Records and started recording their debut self-titled album at Armstrong Studios the following month. The album was co-produced by Wheatley.

Wheatley travelled to Los Angeles in December 1975 and touted the group to various record companies until Rupert Perry of Capitol Records signed them on Christmas Eve.

Under Wheatley's management, the band sold more than 30 million records; six studio albums reached the top 10 on the Australian albums chart and ten singles reached the top 20 on the Billboard Hot 100.

=== John Farnham ===
After Little River Band were dropped by Capitol Records in 1986, Wheatley returned to Australia and continued management of his friend, John Farnham who had been a leading pop singer in the late 1960s and early 1970s but his career had been reduced to playing club gigs before he replaced Glenn Shorrock in 1982 as the lead singer of Little River Band. Wheatley mortgaged his own house to help pay for the recording of Farnham's 1986 comeback album, Whispering Jack. The gamble paid off and re-established Farnham as a major singing star. The album became (and remains) the biggest-selling Australian album of all time by a local artist. Wheatley went on to manage Farnham's career, including tours and records. They remained close friends until Wheatley's death.

=== Later years ===
Wheatley combined with Farnham's session and touring musician, Lindsay Field, to establish the various artists' charity album, The Spirit of Christmas, in 1993. They approached the Myer department stores CEO, who approved and funded the project, with Wheatley and Field as record producers, and released the album via Emerald City/Polydor in November 1993. Wheatley and Field contacted various local artists to choose their songs, with most recording a new rendition of a traditional carol. Proceeds from the album's sale were donated to the Australian branch of The Salvation Army's "Red Shield Appeal". It became popular enough to generate an ongoing series of the same name, which continued until The Spirit of Christmas 2018.

In 1999, Wheatley had published his autobiography, Paper Paradise, which was based in part on a ribald memoir he had begun during his stint in the Masters entitled Who The Hell Is Judy in Sydney?.

Wheatley also managed Australian Neighbours actress and singer Delta Goodrem, helping her to achieve major success, but Goodrem split with Wheatley under acrimonious circumstances in 2003.

== Radio assets ==
In 1980, Wheatley led a consortium that founded EON-FM in Melbourne, the first commercial FM radio station in Australia. It was sold to Triple M in 1985. Wheatley bought EON-FM again in 1986 before selling it to Hoyts. In 2013, EON Broadcasters, in which Wheatley held a 10% shareholding, purchased 91.9 Sea FM and 92.7 Mix FM on the Sunshine Coast from Southern Cross Austereo. In 2017, EON Broadcasters purchased 2CH in Sydney from Macquarie Radio, selling it in 2020 to Sports Entertainment Network.

== Criminal convictions ==
In July 2007, Wheatley pleaded guilty to charges of tax evasion and faced the possibility of up to 10 years in jail. On 19 July 2007, he was sentenced in the County Court to 30 months jail, with a minimum of 15 months to be served. "I'm ashamed of what I have done", Wheatley said in court. "It was something that I have regretted for a long, long time and I'm ashamed of what I've brought on my family, who have had to suffer a lot."

During the trial, many high-profile Australians presented character references for Wheatley, including John Farnham, Sydney Swans' chairman Richard Colless and entertainer Bert Newton. One reference, from army general Peter Cosgrove, described Wheatley as a "very honest and upright person".

However, Commonwealth prosecutor Richard Maidment SC said that "The fraud that was instigated (by Wheatley) can be described as sustained and sophisticated. Tax fraud is not to be seen as a victimless crime." Wheatley was released from Beechworth Correctional Centre on 19 May 2008 and was moved to home detention with electronic surveillance for the remainder of his sentence. Wheatley completed his detention on 18 October 2008 and immediately left for an overseas holiday.

On 14 May 2010, Wheatley was charged with drink driving after recording a blood alcohol level of 0.08 by a random breath testing unit in Rushcutters Bay. He faced Waverley Court on 9 June 2010 and pleaded guilty. His licence was suspended for six months and he received an $850 fine.

== Personal life and death ==
Wheatley married soap opera actress, Gaynor Martin in August 1982 at Melbourne's St Michael's Uniting Church. The couple had one son and two daughters.

The Wheatleys shifted base between Sydney and Melbourne over the years. In June 2012, while walking his son's dog, Danko, Wheatley had part of his middle finger chewed off trying to intervene when another dog attacked.

Wheatley died from complications of COVID-19 on 1 February 2022, at the age of 74.

== Awards and nominations ==
=== Go-Set Pop Poll ===
The Go-Set Pop Poll was coordinated by teen-oriented pop music newspaper Go-Set. It was established in February 1966 and conducted an annual poll from 1966 to 1972 of its readers to determine the most popular personalities.

Year	Nominee / work	Award	Result
1970	Self	Best Guitarist	5th
1971	Self	Best Bass Guitarist	1st

=== Other notable awards ===
Year	Nominee / work	Award	Result
1963	Self	Queensland Apprentice of the Year	
1971	Self	Advance Australia Award for Outstanding Contribution in the Entertainment Industry	
1988	Self	Business Review Weekly Australia's Business Award for Marketing	
1998	The Masters Apprentices	ARIA Hall of Fame	

== Charities and benefits ==
Wheatley produced the "Spirit of Christmas" series of albums for 25 years, with over $5.5 million being raised in that time for both the Salvation Army & the Starlight Children's Foundation.

In 1994, Wheatley instigated a concert to help the people of Rwanda. Featuring John Farnham and Friends, the concert raised funds and awareness to the genocide being perpetrated in that country at the time.

In 1999, with the Australian Troops deployed to East Timor, Wheatley and Talentworks worked with the Armed Forces and, alongside Doc Neeson, facilitated a Concert for the Troops in Dili called "Tour of Duty". The concert was simulcast in Australia by the Seven, Ten and Nine Networks, in what was an Australian-Television-First between the three major networks.

In 2018 and 2019, Wheatley's Talentworks produced 2 concerts to benefit Australian farmers in need, with the 2019 event raising a staggering $4.6 million.

== Finding the Voice ==
Wheatley was credited for the concept and production of Finding the Voice, the multi-award winning documentary about John Farnham. Finding the Voice won the AACTA award for Best Documentary and it is currently recognised as the highest grossing Australian documentary in history. Wheatley Records also produced the ARIA award-winning soundtrack to Finding the Voice.
