= Today =

Today (archaically to-day) usually refers to:

- The current day and calendar date
  - Today is between Friday, 06 November 2026 and Saturday, 07 November 2026, subject to the local time zone
- Now, the time perceived directly, the present
- The current, present era

Today may also refer to:

== Arts, entertainment and media ==
=== Periodicals and websites ===
- Today (Indian newspaper), a defunct afternoon newspaper
- Today (Jintian), a Chinese literary journal co-founded by Huang Rui
- Today (Singapore newspaper), a Singapore English-language digital news publisher
- Today (UK newspaper), a defunct national newspaper in the UK
- Today, a Filipino newspaper that was merged with the Manila Standard resulting in the Manila Standard Today
- Florida Today or Today, a U.S. daily newspaper
- Today Newspaper (Gambia), an independent newspaper in the Gambia, West Africa
- Today Newspapers, a defunct newspaper chain in Texas, US
- Today, the new John Bull, a defunct British magazine
- Today (Italian newspaper), an online newspaper published by Citynews (Italy)
- Radio Today (website), a network of websites reporting on radio news and events based in MediaCityUK

=== Television ===
- Today (1960 TV program), an Australian morning television program
- Today (Australian TV program), an Australian breakfast television program
- Today (Thames Television series), a regional news programme shown in the London area, commonly remembered for Bill Grundy's 1976 interview with the Sex Pistols
- Today (American TV program) (also known as The Today Show), an American morning news and talk television show that airs on NBC
- GMTV Today, a defunct UK weekday breakfast programme
- LK Today, a defunct female lifestyle show presented by Lorraine Kelly, succeeded by GMTV with Lorraine
- Today with Maura and Daithi, an Irish TV morning program

=== Radio ===
- Today (BBC Radio 4), BBC Radio 4's breakfast news and current affairs programme
- Hit Network, formerly the Today Network, a network in Australia
- Today with... (RTÉ Radio 1), an Irish news and current affairs programme
- 2Day FM, a station in Sydney, Australia
- Today FM, an Irish commercial FM radio station available nationally
- Today Show Radio, a simulcast of the American Today Show on Sirius Satellite Radio and XM Satellite Radio
- Radio Today, a Bangladeshi radio station

=== Films ===
- Today (1930 film), a 1930 American drama directed by William Nigh
- Today (2012 film) or Aujourd'hui, a 2012 French film
- Today (2014 film), a 2014 Iranian film
- To-Day, a 1917 silent drama

=== Music ===
==== Groups ====
- Today (group), an American R&B vocal group
- Today (production duo), a Canadian record producer team

==== Albums ====
- Today (Angela Aki album), or the title song, 2007
- Today (Elvis Presley album), 1975
- Today (Galaxie 500 album), 1988
- Today! (Herbie Mann album), or the title song, 1966
- Today (Johnny Hartman album), 1972
- Today (Junkie XL album), or the title song, 2006
- Today (Marty Robbins album), 1971
- Today! (Mississippi John Hurt album), 1966
- Today (Perry Como album), 1987
- Today! (Skip James album), 1966
- Today (The Statler Brothers album), 1983
- Today (Superpitcher album), 2005
- Today (Today album), 1988
- The Beach Boys Today!, 1965
- Today, by 33Miles, 2010
- Today!, by The Airmen of Note, 1978
- Today, by Gary McFarland, 1969
- Today, by Johnny Maestro & the Brooklyn Bridge, 2004
- Today, by Raul Malo, or the title song, 2001

==== EPs ====
- Today (EP), by Everlast, or the title song, 1999
- Today, by Gigi Leung, 1999

==== Songs ====
- "Today" (Brad Paisley song), 2016
- "Today" (Gary Allan song), 2009
- "Today" (Jefferson Airplane song), 1967
- "Today" (Mel B song), 2005
- "Today" (The New Christy Minstrels song), 1964
- "Today" (Scooter song), 2014
- "Today" (The Smashing Pumpkins song), 1993
- "Today" (Talk Talk song), 1982
- "Today", by Air
- "Today", by Barry Ryan
- "Today", by Danny Brown from Atrocity Exhibition
- "Today", by Family
- "Today", by Hank Thompson from Country Love Ballads
- "Today", by Joshua Radin from We Were Here
- "Today", by Kim Dong-ryool from Walking With
- "Today", by KMFDM from Adios
- "Today", by Lagwagon from Double Plaidinum
- "Today", by Lifehouse from Lifehouse
- "Today", by Mad Caddies from Keep It Going
- "Today", by Poe from the soundtrack of the film Great Expectations
- "Today", by Sandie Shaw
- "Today", by Sugababes from The Lost Tapes
- "Today", by VIXX LR from Whisper
- "Today", by Zero 7 from The Garden
- "T.O.D.A.Y", by Royce da 5'9" featuring Ingrid Smalls from Death Is Certain

=== Characters ===
- Today, in the Abbott and Costello comedy routine Who's on First?

== Other uses ==
- Today Art Museum, in Beijing, China
- Today sponge, a brand of barrier contraceptive

== See also ==
- Today Today, an Australian radio show
- "Today Today" (song), by Cowboys International, 1980
- Not Today (disambiguation)
- Tomorrow (disambiguation)
- Yesterday (disambiguation)
- Yesterday and Today (disambiguation)
- Portal:Current events
