= Then and Now =

Then and Now may refer to:

== Music ==
- Then and Now, a 1979 HBO special featuring the Association
- Live Then & Now '99, a concert tour by Mike Oldfield
- "Then and Now" (song), a 1954 song by Paul Whiteman

=== Albums ===
- Then & Now (Asia album), 1990
- Then and Now (David Cassidy album), 2002
- Then and Now (Doc Watson album), 1973
- Then and Now (Emerson, Lake & Palmer album), 1998
- Then & Now (g.o.d album), 2019
- Then and Now (Grover Washington Jr. album), 1988
- Then & Now (The Jets album), 1998
- Then and Now (Livin Out Loud album), 2004
- Then and Now (Nik Kershaw album), 2005
- Then and Now (Lynyrd Skynyrd album), 2000
- Then & Now (Shirley Jones album), 2008
- Then and Now (Warrant album), 2004
- Then and Now (The Who album), 2004
- Then & Now... The Best of The Monkees, 1986
- Then & Now: The Hits Collection, by Tracy Lawrence, 2005
- Then & Now: The Very Best of Petula Clark, 2008
- Then and Now, by Dokken, 2002

== Other uses ==
- Then and Now (books), a series of books featuring historical and contemporary photographs of various locations
- Then and Now (novel), a 1946 novel by W. Somerset Maugham
- Then and Now (retailer), a London-based internet retailer of clothing and accessories
- Then and Now with Andy Cohen, a 2015 TV series

== See also ==
- Now and Then (disambiguation)
- Every Now and Then (disambiguation)
- Past and Present (disambiguation)
- Yesterday and Today (disambiguation)
