= Tomorrow and tomorrow and tomorrow (disambiguation) =

Tomorrow and tomorrow and tomorrow is a famous quotation from Shakespeare's play Macbeth.

Tomorrow and tomorrow and tomorrow may also refer to:

- "Tomorrow and Tomorrow and Tomorrow" (short story), a 1953 story by Kurt Vonnegut
- Tomorrow, and Tomorrow, and Tomorrow..., 1974 anthology reprinting the 1957 short story "Omnilingual" by H. Beam Piper
- Tomorrow and Tomorrow and Tomorrow, U.S. title for Aldous Huxley's 1956 essay collection Adonis and the Alphabet
- Tomorrow and Tomorrow and Tomorrow, 1947 Australian novel by M. Barnard Eldershaw
- "Tomorrow, and Tomorrow, and Tomorrow", season 2 episode of The Orville
- "Tomorrow and Tomorrow and Tomorrow" (Star Trek: Strange New Worlds), an episode of the second season of Star Trek: Strange New Worlds
- Tomorrow, and Tomorrow, and Tomorrow (novel), 2022, by Gabrielle Zevin
- Tomorrow, and Tomorrow, and Tomorrow (film), an upcoming film based on 2022 novel of the same name
- "Tomorrow and Tomorrow and Tomorrow: A Lockdown Christmas 1603", the final episode of Upstart Crow
- Tomorrow, Tomorrow and Tomorrow, an album by Bill Fay recorded in 1978–1981 and released in 2005

== See also ==
- Tomorrow and Tomorrow & The Fairy Chessmen, a 1951 collection of two novels by Lewis Padgett
- Tomorrow and Tomorrow (disambiguation)
- Tomorrow (disambiguation)
