= PAST =

PAST or Past may refer to:

- past, the totality of events which occurred before a given moment in time
- Past tense
- PAST (Poland) (Polish: Polska Akcyjna Spółka Telefoniczna, Polish Telephone Joint-stock Company), a defunct Polish telephone operator
- PAST Foundation, an American educational foundation
- PAST storage utility, a distributed storage system
- Pan African School of Theology (PAST), Nyahururu, Kenya
- Pontifical Academy of Saint Thomas Aquinas, a pontifical academy
- Primeval Structure Telescope (PaST), a Chinese radio telescope
- Summit Airport (Alaska) (ICAO airport code: PAST)
- Past a sculpture in Washington, D.C, by Robert Ingersoll Aitken
- PAST: The Newsletter of the Prehistoric Society
- Ámbar Past, US-born poet and visual artist

== See also ==
- The Past (disambiguation)
- Past and Present (disambiguation)
- Past tense (disambiguation)
- Yesterday (disambiguation)
- Then (disambiguation)
- Present (disambiguation)
- Future (disambiguation)
