= Men of Tomorrow =

Men of Tomorrow may refer to:

== Film ==
- Men of Tomorrow (1932 film), a British drama film
- Men of Tomorrow (1942 film), a British film by Alfred Travers
- Men of Tomorrow (1946 film), an American short film in the Technicolor Specials (Warner Bros. series)
- Men of Tomorrow (1959 film), a British short feature

== Literature ==
- Mardane Farda (Persian: Men of Tomorrow), a 1982 book by Mansoor Yaghoti
- Men of Tomorrow: Geeks, Gangsters, and the Birth of the Comic Book, a 2005 non-fiction book by Gerard Jones
- Superman: The Men of Tomorrow, a 2016 omnibus collection of Superman comic book issues by DC Comics during the era known as Superman (Volume 3)

== See also ==
- Tomorrow Men
- Tomorrow Man
- Man of Tomorrow (disambiguation)
- Tomorrow (disambiguation)
- Men (disambiguation)
