= Toomorrow =

Toomorrow can refer to:

- Toomorrow (film) a 1970 British science fiction musical film
  - Toomorrow (soundtrack) - the soundtrack from the film
  - Toomorrow (band), the band featured in the film and soundtrack
- Toomorrow (Wagon Christ album), an album by Luke Vibert
