= Tomorrow and Tomorrow =

Tomorrow and Tomorrow may refer to:

- Tomorrow and Tomorrow (film), a 1932 film based on a Broadway play
- Tomorrow and Tomorrow (novel), a 1997 science fiction novel by Charles Sheffield
- "Tomorrow and Tomorrow", the second subtitled section of "Epitaph" (song), a 1969 song by King Crimson
- "Tomorrow and Tomorrow", one of the main musical themes of Final Fantasy XIV: Shadowbringers
- "Tomorrow and Tomorrow and so Forth", a 1955 short story by John Updike

== See also ==
- Tomorrow Tomorrow (disambiguation)
- Tomorrow and tomorrow and tomorrow (disambiguation)
- Tomorrow (disambiguation)
