= And then =

And then or And Then may refer to:

- The Short-circuit evaluation operator "and"
- And Then, the English name of the Japanese novel Sorekara by Natsume Sōseki
- And Then..., the fifth studio album by American recording artist Joe
- "And Then", a song on the Depeche Mode album Construction Time Again

== See also ==
- Now and Then (disambiguation)
