= Past and Present =

Past and Present may refer to:

- Past and Present (book), by Thomas Carlyle, 1843
- Past & Present (journal), a British academic journal
- Past and Present (paintings), series of three paintings by Augustus Egg, 1858
- Past and Present (film), a 1972 Portuguese film
- "Past and Present" (Stargate SG-1), an episode of the TV series
- "Past and Present", an episode of TV series Dark
- Past & Present, a 2010 album by the Carter Family III

== See also ==
- Yesterday and Today (disambiguation)
- Then and Now (disambiguation)
- PAST (disambiguation)
- Present (disambiguation)
