= Tomorrow (time) =

Temporal construct of the relative future

Tomorrow (at UTC+00)
- Saturday, 22 August 2026
Other calendars
Armenian	3 Hoṙi 1476
Aztec	Atemoztli 4, 4 Malīnalli
Babylonian	8 Abu, 2337 SE
Balinese pawukon	Menga, Beteng, Laba, Umanis, Aryang, Saniscara of Medangkungan, Indra, Jangur, Sri
Bengali	6 Bhadro, BS 1433
Chinese	Yang Earth Dragon・Root Mansion; 10 Qīyuè, Bǐngwǔnián (Liqiu, 1 day until Chushu)
Common Era	22 August 2026 CE
Coptic	16 Mesori, AM 1742
Egyptian	8 Tybi, 2775 NE
Ethiopian	16 Naḥasē, 2018 Amätä Məhrät
French Republican	Décade I, Quintidi de Fructidor de l'Année 234 de la République
Gregorian	22 August, AD 2026
Hebrew	9 Elul, AM 5786
Icelandic	Laugardagur, 28 Heyannir 2026
Islamic	8 Rabi' al-awwal, AH 1448 (using tabular method)
ISO week date	2026-W34-6
Japanese	10 Fumizuki, Reiwa 8 (Risshū, 1 day until Shosho)
Julian	9 August, AD 2026 (AM 7534)
Julian day	2461275
Maya	13.0.13.15.12; 5 Mol, 4 Eb
Roman	ante diem V Idus Augustas, MMDCCLXXIX AUC
Solar Hijri	31 Mordad, SH 1405

Tomorrow (or archaically to-morrow) is a temporal construct of the relative future; literally of the day after the current day (today), or figuratively of future periods or times. Tomorrow is usually considered just beyond the present and counter to yesterday. It is important in time perception because it is the first direction the arrow of time takes humans on Earth.

== Philosophy ==
The use of terms such as tomorrow, now and future are part of an a-series view which is part of the presentism philosophy of time.

== Learning and language ==
For a young child, "tomorrow" is "an undefined, infinite time of the idea that time is just an infinite and arbitrary definition of an yet unidentified of what we like to call time, yet the child slowly learns the meaning of tomorrow." The concept of "tomorrow" is rarely understood by 3-year-old children, but 4-year-olds understand the idea.
