= Tomorrow =

Tomorrow (archaically to-morrow) usually refers to:

- Tomorrow (time), the day after today
- The future, anything that happens after the present

Tomorrow may also refer to:

== Periodicals ==
- To-Morrow (Chicago magazine), a magazine from 1903 to 1909
- Tomorrow (New Zealand magazine), a left-wing magazine from 1934 to 1940
- Tomorrow (New York magazine), a parapsychology magazine from 1941 to the 1960s
- Tomorrow Speculative Fiction, a magazine
- Studies in Comparative Religion, originally Tomorrow, an academic journal

== Television ==
=== Series ===
- The Tomorrow Show, a 1973–1981 American late-night talk show hosted by Tom Snyder
- Tomorrow (Taiwanese TV series), a 2002 drama series
- Tomorrow (South Korean TV series), a 2022 drama series

=== Episodes ===
- "Tomorrow" (12 Monkeys), 2015
- "Tomorrow" (Angel), 2002
- "Tomorrow" (Animalia), 2008
- "Tomorrow" (The Bear), 2024
- "Tomorrow" (First Wave), 2000
- "Tomorrow" (Law & Order: Criminal Intent), 2002
- "Tomorrow" (Playhouse 90), 1960
- "Tomorrow" (The West Wing), 2006

== Film ==
- Tomorrow, a 1952 Chinese film directed by Doe Ching
- Tomorrow (1969 film), a South Korean film of 1969
- Tomorrow (1972 film), an American film directed by Joseph Anthony
- Tomorrow (1988 film), a Japanese film directed by Kazuo Kuroki
- Tomorrow (1995 film), a Hong Kong film starring Tony Leung Chiu-wai
- Tomorrow (2001 film), an Italian film directed by Francesca Archibugi
- Tomorrow (2012 film), a Russian film shown at the 2012 Stockholm International Film Festival
- Tomorrow (2015 film), a French documentary (Demain) directed by Cyril Dion and Mélanie Laurent
- Tomorrow (2018 film), a British film directed by Martha Pinson
- Tomorrow (2019 film), a Bangladeshi animated short film directed by Mohammad Shihab Uddin

== Literature ==
- Tomorrow (manhwa), a 2017 South Korean manhwa series
- Tomorrow (novel), a novel by Graham Swift
- Tomorrow series, a series of novels by John Marsden
- Tom Tomorrow, the pen name of American editorial cartoonist Dan Perkins
- Tomorrow, a play by Robert Drouet
- T. O. Morrow, a supervillain from DC Comics
- Tomorrow "Tomo", a fictional character in the webtoon Live with Yourself!

== Music ==
=== Albums ===
- Tomorrow (C-Murder album), 2010
- Tomorrow (Elva Hsiao album), 2001
- Tomorrow (Hugh Masekela album), 1987
- Tomorrow (SR-71 album), 2002
- Tomorrow (Sean Kingston album), 2009
- Tomorrow (Tomorrow album), 1968
- Tomorrow (TVXQ album), 2018
- Tomorrow, by The Winans, and the title song, 1984
- Tomorrow, an EP by Oh Hiroshima, 2010

=== Songs ===
- "Tomorrow" (Amanda Lear song), 1977
- "Tomorrow" (Annie song), from the musical Annie, 1977
- "Tomorrow" (Chris Young song), 2011
- "Tomorrow" (GloRilla song), 2022
- "Tomorrow" (Kiss song), 1980
- "Tomorrow" (Lillix song), 2003
- "Tomorrow" (Morrissey song), 1992
- "Tomorrow" (Paul McCartney song), first recorded by Wings, 1971; covered by David Cassidy, 1976
- "Tomorrow" (Silverchair song), 1994
- "Tomorrow" (Sixx:A.M. song), 2008
- "Tomorrow" (SR-71 song), 2002
- "Tomorrow" (Strawbs song), 1972
- "Tomorrow (A Better You, Better Me)", by the Brothers Johnson, 1976; covered by Quincy Jones with Tevin Campbell, 1990
- "Tomorrow (Give in to the Night)", by Dimitri Vegas & Like Mike, Dada Life, and Tara McDonald, 2010
- "Tomorrow (Is Another Day)", by Marc Mysterio featuring Samantha Fox, 2009
- "Tomorrow", by Amy Grant from Straight Ahead, 1984
- "Tomorrow", by Avril Lavigne from Let Go, 2002
- "Tomorrow", by Bad Religion from Generator, 1992
- "Tomorrow", by Beverley Knight from Prodigal Sista, 1998
- "Tomorrow", by Brandy Norwood from Never Say Never, 1998
- "Tomorrow", by Brittany Howard from Jaime, 2019
- "Tomorrow", by Brotherhood of Man from Singing a Song, 1979
- "Tomorrow", by Brymo from Theta, 2022
- "Tomorrow", by BTS from Skool Luv Affair, 2014
- "Tomorrow", by the Cardigans from Life, 1995
- "Tomorrow", by Clinic from Do It!, 2008
- "Tomorrow", by the Communards from Red, 1987
- "Tomorrow", by the Cranberries from Roses, 2012
- "Tomorrow", by Dave Gahan, a B-side of the single "Kingdom", 2007
- "Tomorrow", by Diana Ross from Thank You, 2021
- "Tomorrow", by England Dan & John Ford Coley from Fables, 1972
- "Tomorrow", by Europe from Out of This World, 1988
- "Tomorrow", by Gianluca Bezzina, representing Malta in the Eurovision Song Contest 2013
- "Tomorrow", by Gorky Park from Moscow Calling, 1992
- "Tomorrow", by Information Society from Information Society, 1988
- "Tomorrow", by James from Whiplash, 1997
- "Tomorrow", by Joe Walsh from But Seriously, Folks..., 1978
- "Tomorrow", by John Legend from Love in the Future, 2013
- "Tomorrow", by Johnny Brandon, 1955
- "Tomorrow", by Jorja Smith from Lost and Found, 2018
- "Tomorrow", by Kali Uchis from Isolation, 2018
- "Tomorrow", by Ladytron from Velocifero, 2008
- "Tomorrow", by Lovejoy from From Studio 4, 2023
- "Tomorrow", by MIKA from My Name Is Michael Holbrook, 2019
- "Tomorrow", by Mikuni Shimokawa, 2002
- "Tomorrow", by Mr FijiWiji, 2017
- "Tomorrow", by Naomi Shemer, 1967
- "Tomorrow", by Night Ranger from ATBPO, 2021
- "Tomorrow", by Out of Eden from No Turning Back, 1999
- "Tomorrow", by Ozzy Osbourne from Ozzmosis, 1995
- "Tomorrow", by Pale Waves from Who Am I?, 2021
- "Tomorrow", by Public Service Broadcasting from The Race for Space, 2015
- "Tomorrow", by Rocko from Self Made, 2008
- "Tomorrow", by Ryan Adams from Demolition, 2002
- "Tomorrow", by Sandie Shaw, 1966
- "Tomorrow", by Stone Temple Pilots with Chester Bennington from High Rise, 2013
- "Tomorrow", by Strawberry Alarm Clock from Wake Up...It's Tomorrow, 1968
- "Tomorrow", by Thievery Corporation from The Mirror Conspiracy, 2000
- "Tomorrow", by Tinchy Stryder from Third Strike, 2010
- "Tomorrow", by Tongue 'n' Cheek, 1990
- "Tomorrow", by Tyler, The Creator from Chromakopia, 2024
- "Tomorrow", by U2 from October, 1981
- "Tomorrow", by Wall of Voodoo from Call of the West, 1982
- "Tomorrow", from the musical Bugsy Malone, 1976
- "(I Want to Go) To Morrow", by Lew Sully, 1898, shortened to "To Morrow" on the 1960 re-recording by The Kingston Trio

=== Other uses in music ===
- Tomorrow Records, an Australian punk record label
- Tomorrow (band), a 1960s British psychedelic rock group

== Other uses ==
- Tomorrow River, a river in the U.S. state of Wisconsin

== See also ==
- "Tomorrow Never Knows", a 1966 song by The Beatles
- Tomorrow Tomorrow (disambiguation)
- Tomorrow and tomorrow and tomorrow
- "Tomorrow's (Just Another Day)", a 1983 song by Madness
- Tomorrowland (disambiguation)
- Toomorrow (disambiguation)
- Future (disambiguation)
- Today (disambiguation)
- Yesterday (disambiguation)
