= Yesterday (time) =

Temporal construct of the relative past

Yesterday (at UTC+00)
- Thursday, 20 August 2026
Other calendars
Armenian	1 Hoṙi 1476
Aztec	Atemoztli 2, 2 Itzcuintli
Babylonian	6 Abu, 2337 SE
Balinese pawukon	Menga, Kajeng, Menala, Wage, Maulu, Wraspati of Medangkungan, Uma, Dadi, Suka
Bengali	6 Bhadro, BS 1433
Chinese	Yang Fire Tiger・Horn Mansion; 8 Qīyuè, Bǐngwǔnián (Liqiu, 3 days until Chushu)
Common Era	20 August 2026 CE
Coptic	14 Mesori, AM 1742
Egyptian	6 Tybi, 2775 NE
Ethiopian	14 Naḥasē, 2018 Amätä Məhrät
French Republican	Décade I, Tridi de Fructidor de l'Année 234 de la République
Gregorian	20 August, AD 2026
Hebrew	7 Elul, AM 5786
Icelandic	Fimmtudagur, 26 Heyannir 2026
Islamic	6 Rabi' al-awwal, AH 1448 (using tabular method)
ISO week date	2026-W34-4
Japanese	8 Fumizuki, Reiwa 8 (Risshū, 3 days until Shosho)
Julian	7 August, AD 2026 (AM 7534)
Julian day	2461273
Maya	13.0.13.15.10; 3 Mol, 2 Oc
Roman	ante diem VII Idus Augustas, MMDCCLXXIX AUC
Solar Hijri	29 Mordad, SH 1405

Yesterday is a temporal construct of the relative past; literally of the day before the current day (today), or figuratively of earlier periods or times, often but not always within living memory.

== Learning and language ==
The concepts of "yesterday", "today" and "tomorrow" are among the first relative time concepts acquired by infants. In language a distinctive noun or adverb for "yesterday" is present in most but not all languages, though languages with ambiguity in vocabulary also have other ways to distinguish the immediate past and immediate future. "Yesterday" is also a relative term and concept in grammar and syntax.

Yesterday is an abstract concept in the sense that events that occurred in the past do not exist in the present reality, though their consequences persist.

Some languages have a hesternal tense: a dedicated grammatical form for events of the previous day.
