= Present (Aitken) =

Sculpture in Washington, D.C., U.S.

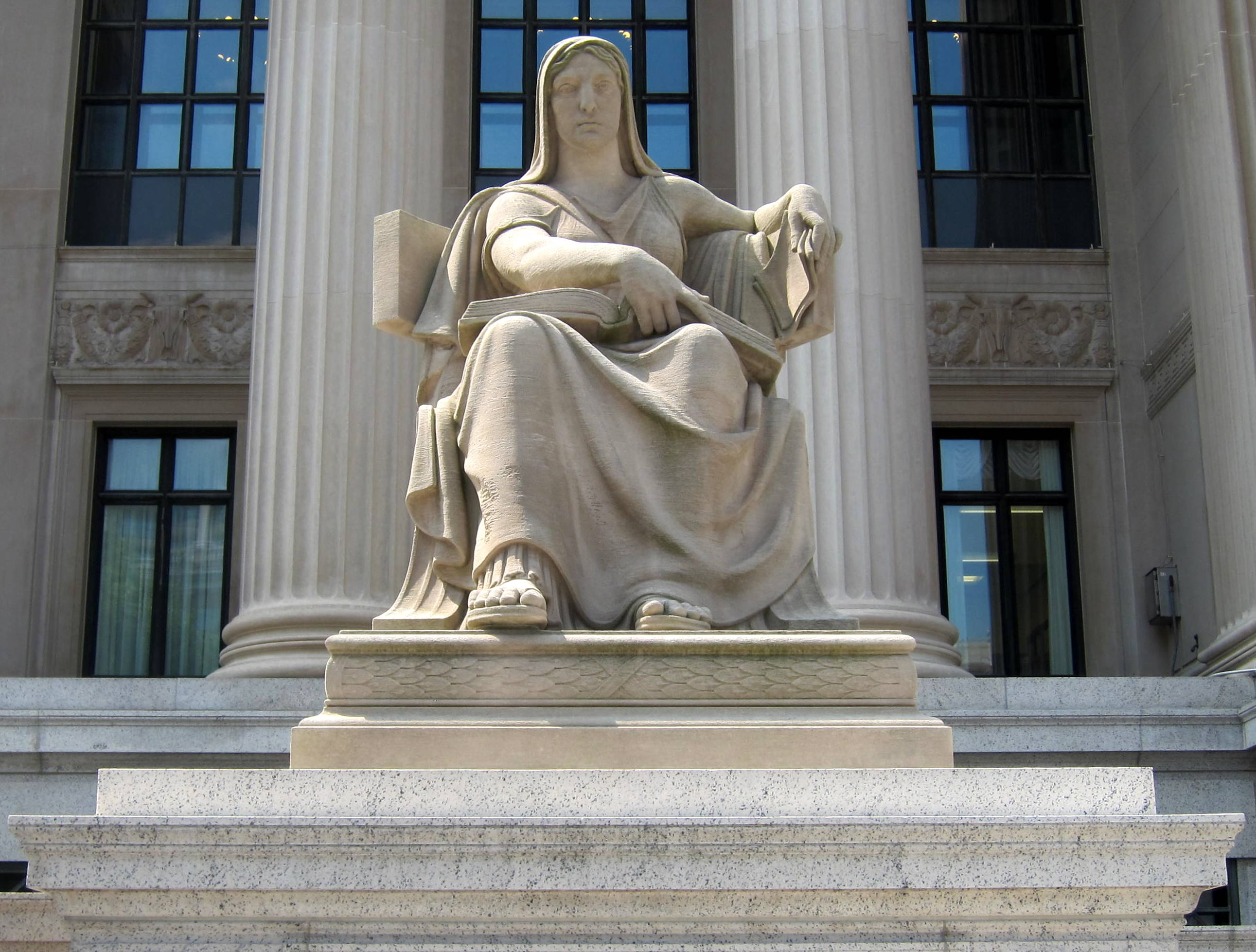
- The sculpture in 2010
- Artist: Robert Ingersoll Aitken
- Year: 1935
- Type: Sculpture
- Location: Washington, D.C., United States; 38°53′36″N 77°01′22″W

Present, also known as Future, is a 1935 outdoor sculpture by Robert Ingersoll Aitken, located in front of the National Archives Building in Washington, D.C., in the United States. John Russell Pope served as the sculpture's architect and Edward H. Ratti served as its carver. The sculpture is made of Indiana limestone and measures approximately 20 x 8 x 12 feet, with a base approximately 12 x 12 x 15 feet. Present is a companion piece to Past, also located in front of the National Archives Building.

== See also ==
- 1935 in art
- List of public art in Washington, D.C., Ward 6
