= Man of Tomorrow (disambiguation) =

Man of Tomorrow may refer to:

== Superman ==
- Superman, a DC Comics character sometimes referred to as "The Man of Tomorrow"
  - Superman: The Man of Tomorrow, a 1995–1999 comic book series
  - Man of Tomorrow (script), a 2012 spec script for a film noir treatment of Batman v Superman by Jeremy Slater
  - Superman: Man of Tomorrow, a 2020 animated film
  - Superboy: The Man of Tomorrow, a 2023 limited series comic book; see List of DC Comics publications (P–S)
  - Man of Tomorrow (film), an upcoming 2027 film featuring Superman and Lex Luthor

== Other uses ==
- Captain Future: Man of Tomorrow, a 1940s comic book featuring Captain Future
- "The Man of Tomorrow", a 1947 Mickey Mouse comic strip in the Mickey Mouse universe
- "Man of Tomorrow", a 1998 song by Coolie Ranx
- "Ned Frischman: Man of Tomorrow", a 2004 animated U.S. TV episode of the TV show Dave the Barbarian
- "Man of Tomorrow", a 2006 U.S. animated TV episode, the series premiere of Legion of Super Heroes (TV series)
- "The Man of Tomorrow", a 2013 episode of the podcast 99% Invisible; see List of 99% Invisible episodes
- Man of Tomorrow, a 2014 documentary about techno music by Jeff Mills

== See also ==
- Tomorrow Men
- Tomorrow Man
- Men of Tomorrow (disambiguation)
- Tomorrow (disambiguation)
- Man (disambiguation)
