= The Past =

The past denotes period of time that has already happened, in contrast to the present and the future.

The Past may also refer to:

- "The Past" (Sevendust song), 2008
- The Past (2007 film), Argentine film
- The Past (2013 film), French film by the Iranian director Asghar Farhadi
- The Past (2018 film), Indian horror film
- The Past (Chinese: 過去), book by Yu Dafu
- "The Past", song by Ray Parker Jr. from After Dark
- "The Past", song by Korn from Korn III: Remember Who You Are
- "The Past", song by Matt Mays from When the Angels Make Contact

== See also ==
- PAST (disambiguation)
