= Tomorrow Tomorrow =

Tomorrow Tomorrow may refer to:

- "Tomorrow Tomorrow" (Bee Gees song), 1969
- "Tomorrow Tomorrow", a song by Elliott Smith from XO

== See also ==
- Tomorrow (disambiguation)
- Tomorrow and Tomorrow (disambiguation)
