= National Archives Building =

Building in Washington, D.C.

- U.S. National Register of Historic Places
- U.S. National Historic Landmark
- U.S. Historic district – Contributing property
- D.C. Inventory of Historic Sites
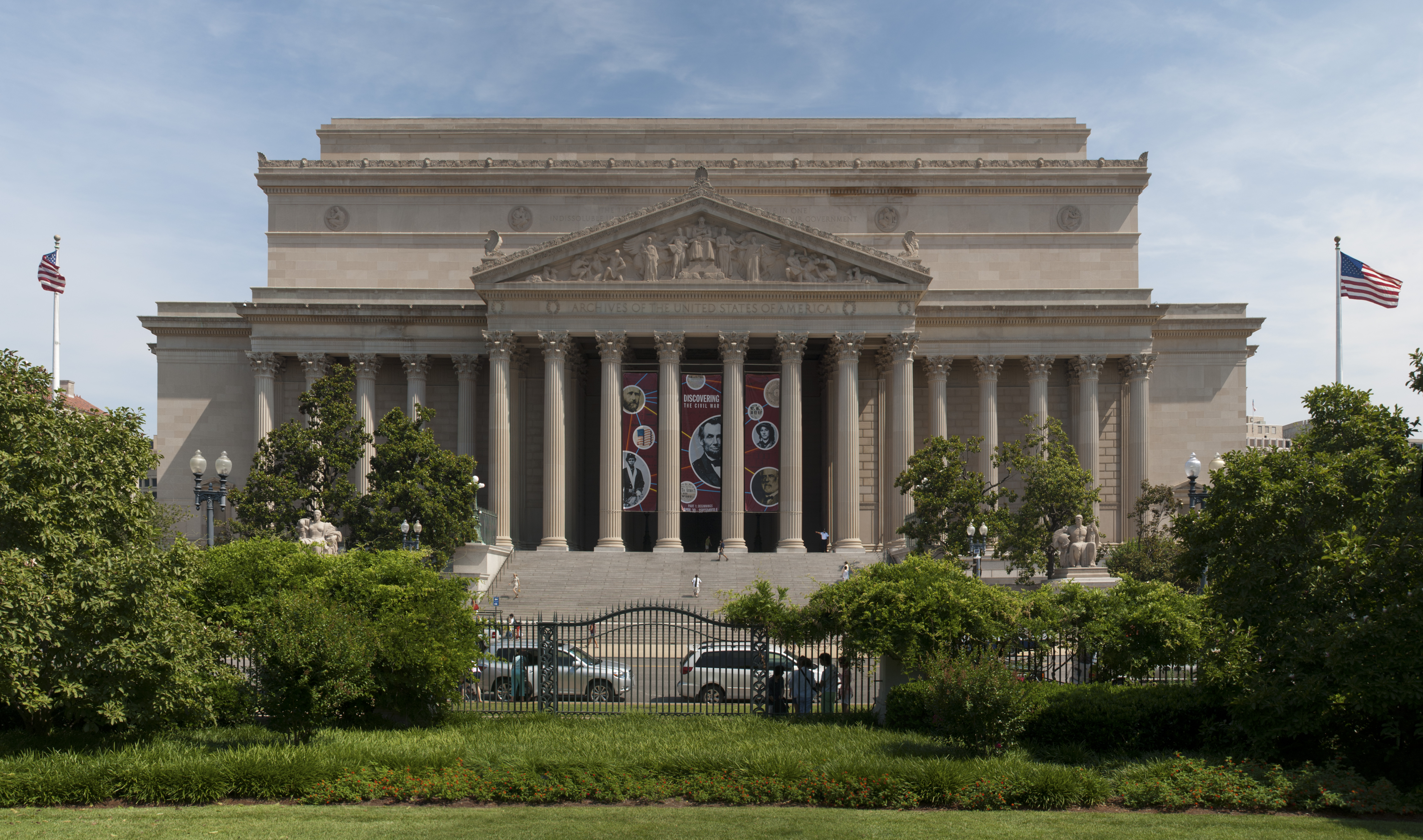
- The National Archives Building in Washington, D.C.

- Location within Washington, D.C.
- Location: Constitution Avenue between 7th Street and 9th Street, NW, Washington, D.C., U.S.
- Coordinates: 38°53′34″N 77°01′23″W
- Built: 1935; 91 years ago
- Architect: John Russell Pope
- Architectural style: Classical Revival
- Part of: Pennsylvania Avenue National Historic Site (ID66000865)
- NRHP reference No.: 71001004 (NRHP listing); 100009816 (NHL designation)
- DCIHS No.: 408

Significant dates
- Added to NRHP: May 27, 1971
- Designated NHL: December 11, 2023
- Designated CP: October 15, 1966
- Designated DCIHS: November 8, 1964

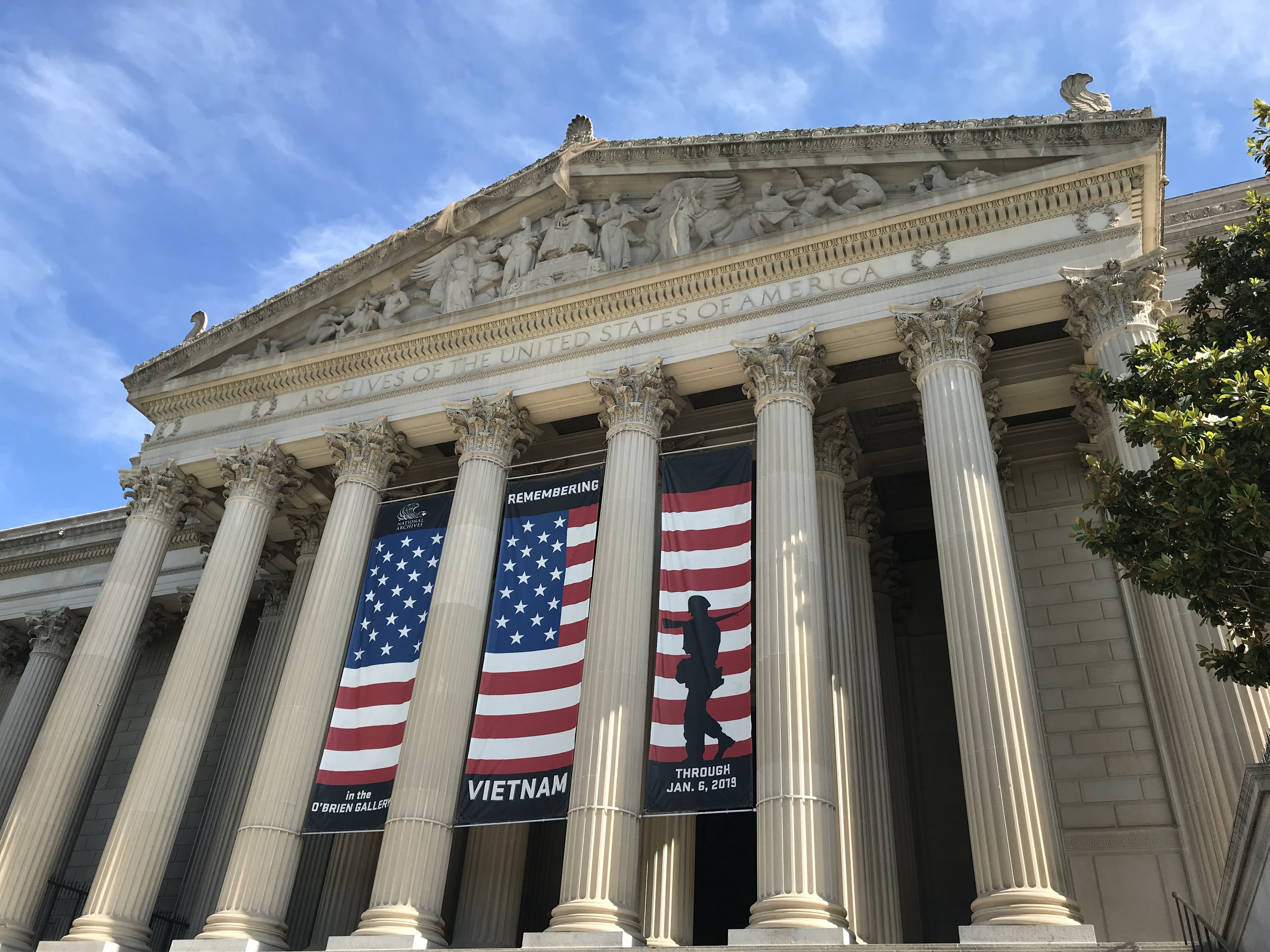
Entrance to the National Archives in Washington, D.C.

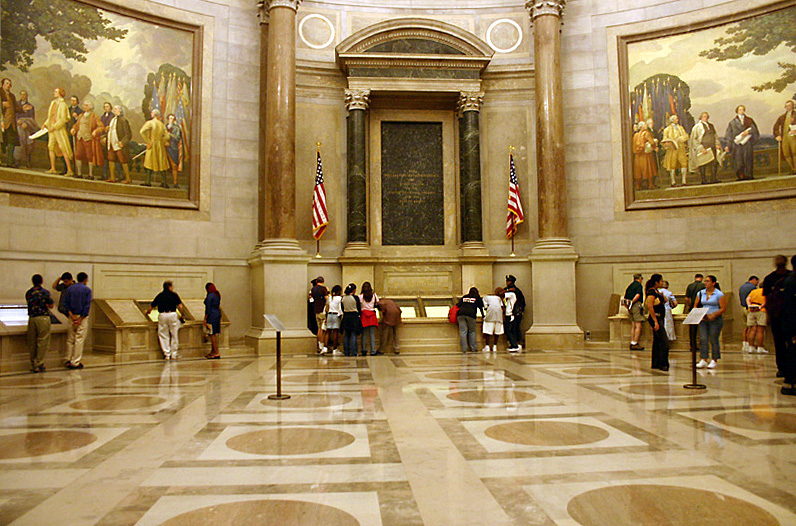
The Rotunda of the National Archives Building, where the Charters of Freedom documents are publicly exhibited

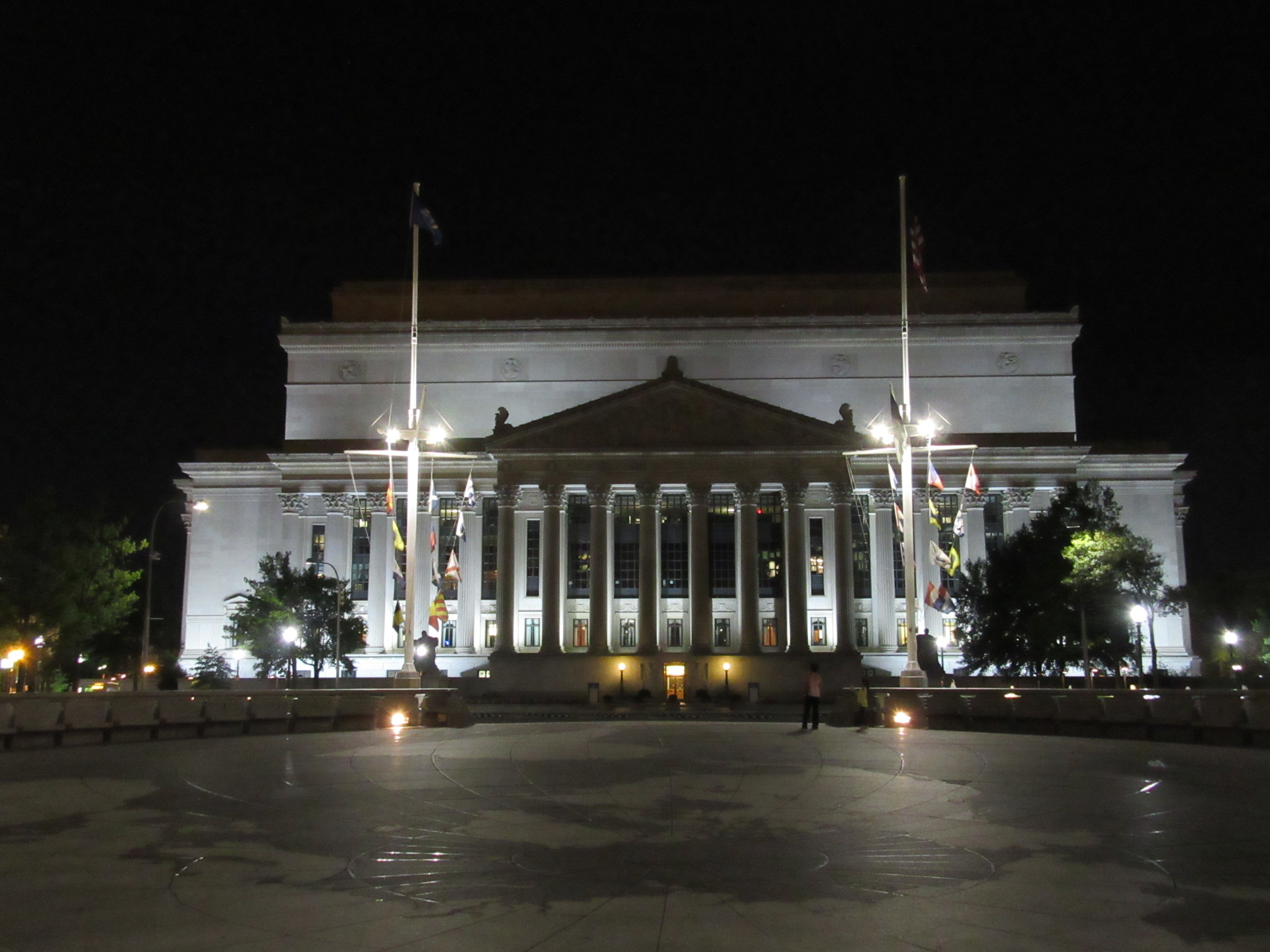
National Archives Building at night

The National Archives Building, known informally as Archives I, is the headquarters of the United States National Archives and Records Administration. It is located north of the National Mall at 700 Pennsylvania Avenue, N.W. in Washington, D.C. The rotunda entrance is on Constitution Avenue, and the research entrance is on Pennsylvania Avenue. A second larger facility, Archives II, also known as A2, is located in College Park, Maryland.

Built in the 1930s, the National Archives Building was designated a contributing property to the Pennsylvania Avenue National Historic Site in 1966 and added to the National Register of Historic Places in 1971. It was designated a National Historic Landmark in December 2023.

== Exhibits ==
The National Archives building holds the original copies of the three main formative documents of the United States and its government: the Declaration of Independence, the Constitution, and the Bill of Rights. These are on display for the public in the main chamber's rotunda, known as Charters of Freedom, at the National Archives in Washington, D.C. The Emancipation Proclamation and 19th Amendment were added to the display in 2026.

The building hosts additional important American historical items, including the Continental Association, the Articles of Confederation, the Louisiana Purchase Treaty, and collections of photography and other historically and culturally significant American and international artifacts, including an original version of the 1297 Magna Carta confirmed by Edward I.

Between 2003 and 2004 the National Archives also held special exhibits to the public for the Gettysburg Address and Emancipation Proclamation.

Inside the Rotunda for the Charters of Freedom, there are no lines to see the individual documents and visitors are allowed to walk from document to document as they wish. Photography with natural light is permitted in research rooms.

== History ==
=== Before the National Archives Building ===
From its founding, the U.S. federal government has documented its policies and decisions, but for almost 150 years it had virtually no method or place to safeguard historically important records. During those years, officials occasionally decried federal neglect, or too often, fires destroyed important documents, reinforcing the need for an archives. By the end of the 19th century, a few architects had even submitted plans to the government for an archives or a hall of records. By the early 20th century an organized effort aimed at creating the National Archives began, but not until 1926 did Congress finally approve the National Archives Building.

=== Planning stages ===
That year, Congress authorized construction of the National Archives Building as part of a massive public buildings program designed to beautify the center of Washington, DC, and provide office space for the growing federal bureaucracy. This program led to the design and construction of buildings within the Federal Triangle. Secretary of the Treasury Andrew W. Mellon gave the responsibility for designing the Triangle grouping to a Board of Architectural Consultants. Louis A. Simon, an architect of the Office of the Supervising Architect for the U.S. Treasury, drafted a preliminary design for the Archives, placing it along Pennsylvania Avenue between 9th and 10th Streets, NW. (This was prior to Simon's appointment as Supervising Architect in 1933.)

In late 1927, preliminary drawings of the individual Triangle buildings were incorporated into a formal presentation of the entire project. The drawings became the basis for a three-dimensional scale model that was publicly unveiled in April 1929. The next month, after examining the model, the Commission of Fine Arts was highly critical of Simon's design for an archives. Commissioners suggested that the noted architect John Russell Pope be added to the Board of Architectural Consultants and that he design the National Archives. Pope was asked to join when the death of a board member created a vacancy.

Pope's architectural vision transformed both the location and design of the National Archives Building. He successfully proposed relocating the Archives to the block between Seventh and Eighth Streets, a site he believed demanded a monumental building such as the National Archives. In place of Simon's design, Pope's National Archives was to be a neoclassical temple befitting an institution dedicated to American history. The site was already occupied by a prominent landmark, the Center Market. The building was demolished to make way for the archives building.

=== Breaking ground ===
Ground was broken for the National Archives on September 5, 1931, by the Assistant Secretary of the Treasury, Ferry K. Heath. By the time President Herbert Hoover laid the cornerstone of the building in February 1933, significant problems had arisen. Because the massive structure was to be constructed above an underground stream, the Tiber Creek, 8,575 piles had been driven into the unstable soil, before pouring a huge concrete bowl as a foundation. Another difficulty arose over the choice of building materials. Both limestone and granite were authorized as acceptable, but construction began during the darkest days of the Great Depression, and suppliers of each material lobbied fiercely to have the government use their stone. Ultimately, as in the other Federal Triangle buildings, limestone was used for the exterior superstructure and granite for the base. The limestone was provided by Ingalls Stone Company of Bedford, Indiana.

=== Construction ===
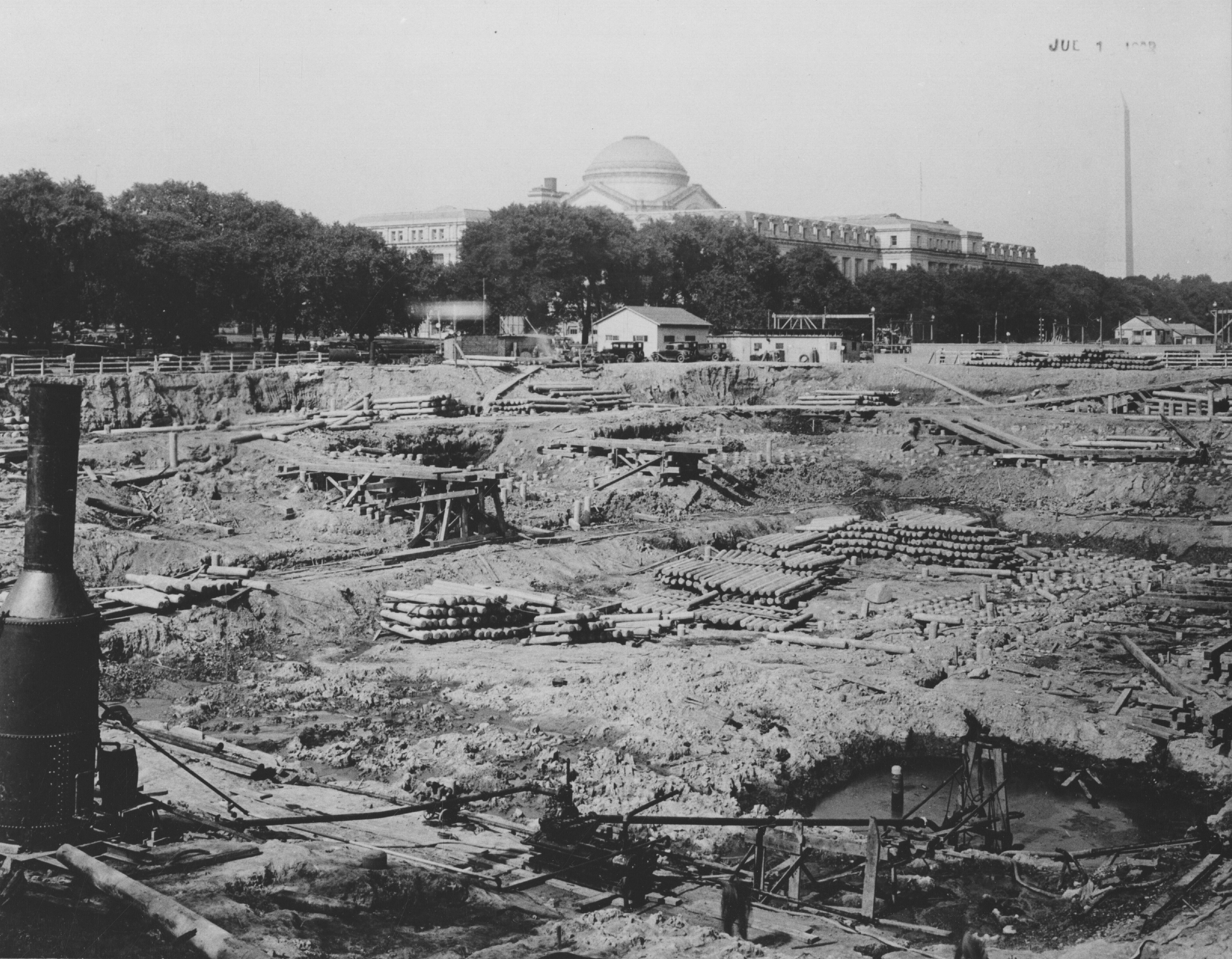
Construction of the Foundation for the National Archives Building

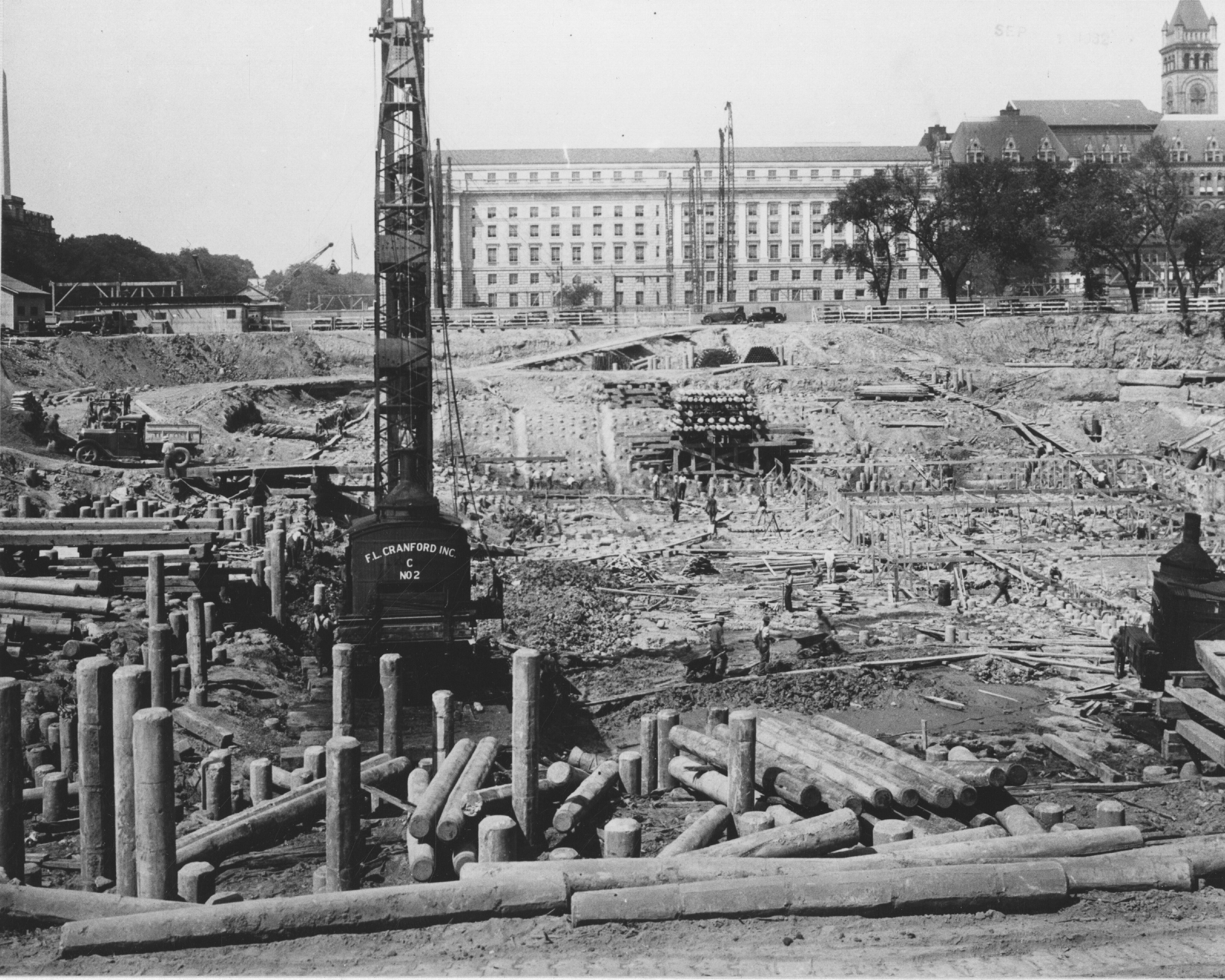
Advanced Construction of the Foundation for the National Archives Building

Constructing the National Archives was a monumental task. Not only was the building the most ornate structure on the Federal Triangle, but it also called for installation of specialized air-handling systems and filters, reinforced flooring, and thousands of feet of shelving to meet the building's archival storage requirements. The building's exterior took more than 4 years to finish and required a host of workers ranging from sculptors and model makers to air-conditioning contractors and structural-steel workers.

=== Completion ===
In November 1935, 120 National Archives staff members moved into their uncompleted building. Most of the exterior work was complete, but many stack areas, where records would be stored, had no shelving for incoming records. Work also continued on the Rotunda and other public spaces. More significantly, earlier estimates about the need for future stack space proved to be quite insufficient. Almost as soon as Pope's original design was complete, a project to fill the Archives' interior courtyard began, doubling storage space from 374,000 square feet (34,700 m^{2}) to more than 757,000 square feet (70,300 m^{2}).

John Russell Pope's vision of the Archives as a temple of history has been preserved through maintenance and periodic restoration work on the building since the mid-1930s. Over the years, however, more records filled the building and even the courtyard expansion proved to be inadequate. By the late 1960s, the building reached its storage capacity of 900,000 cubic feet (25,000 m^{3}) and the agency began renting large amounts of storage and administrative space. The 1993 completion of a second National Archives building in College Park, Maryland, added 1.8 million square feet (170,000 m^{2}) to the National Archives, providing the nation with the most modern archives facility in the world.

=== Reencasement and renovation ===
The Declaration of Independence, the Constitution, and the Bill of Rights have been displayed to the public in the Rotunda of the National Archives Building since 1952. That year National Bureau of Standards placed the documents into hermetically sealed encasements filled with inert helium gas, which the Bureau believed would preserve the Charters well into the next century. Since the 1952 installation, National Archives conservators have conducted regular visual inspections of the encased documents. Since 1987, these inspections have been greatly enhanced through the use of an electronic imaging monitoring system developed for NASA by the Jet Propulsion Laboratory in California.

In an electronic inspection of the documents in 1995, conservators noticed changes in the glass encasements of the Declaration of Independence and the Bill of Rights. Glass experts from Libby-Owens-Ford (the original manufacturer of the encasement glass) and the Corning Glass Museum determined that the case glass components were showing signs of deterioration. Both the glass experts and the National Archives Advisory Committee on Preservation recommended that the Charters be reencased within seven years (by 2002) to ensure the continued safety and preservation of the documents.

In July 2001, the Charters were taken off display in the Rotunda to be removed from their deteriorating cases. National Archives conservators removed the documents from their cases and analyzed their condition. Appropriate conservation measures were taken on each document and they have been installed in the new encasements, returning to public display in September 2003.

=== Timeline ===
- Congress authorized construction in 1926.
- Ground was broken on September 5, 1931.
- President Herbert Hoover laid the cornerstone in February 1933.
- First opened in 1935.
- Completed in 1937.
- A renovation was completed in late 2004.
- Public display space expanded from 12,000 to more than 19,000 square feet in 2013.

== Statues ==
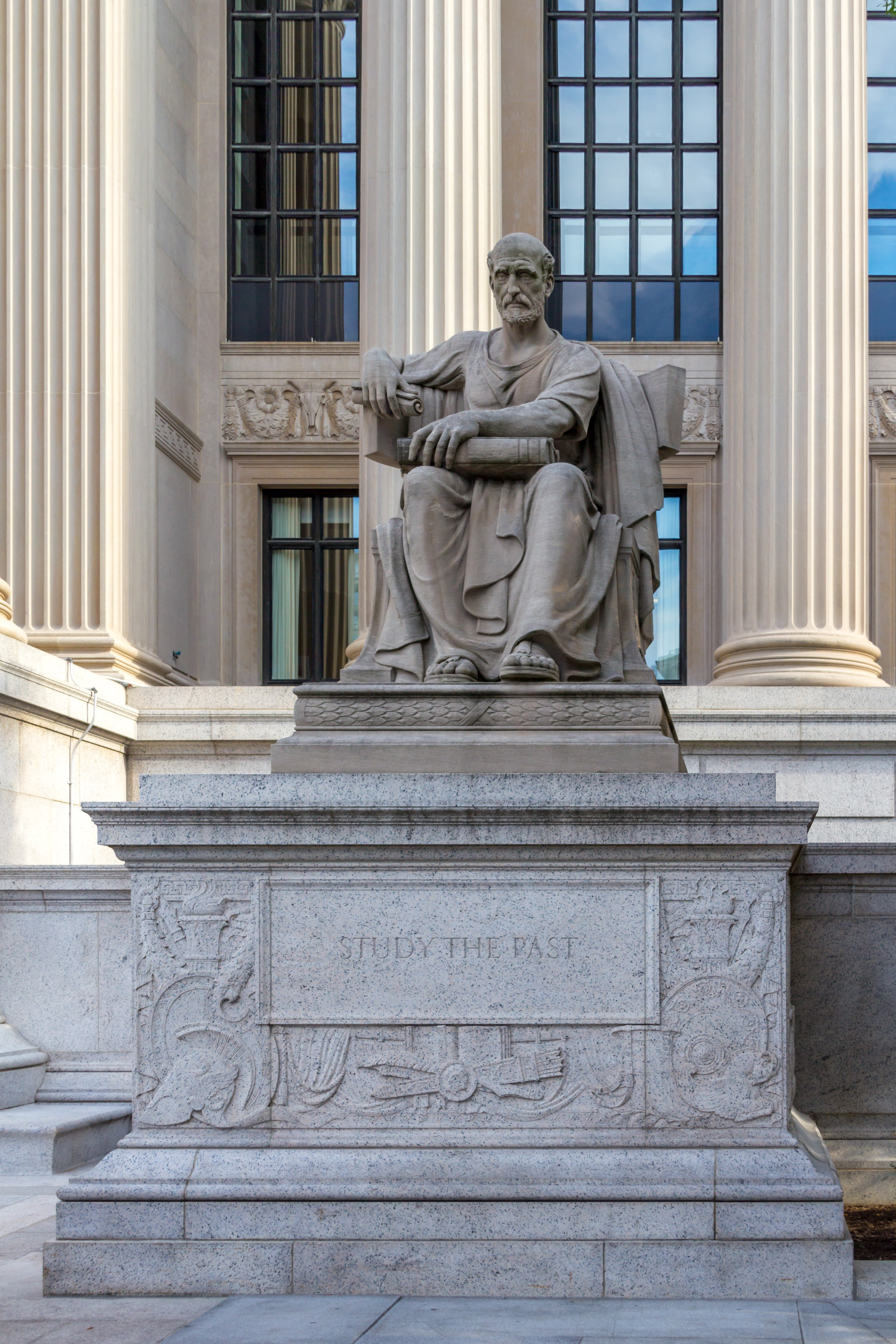
Study The Past by Robert Aiken

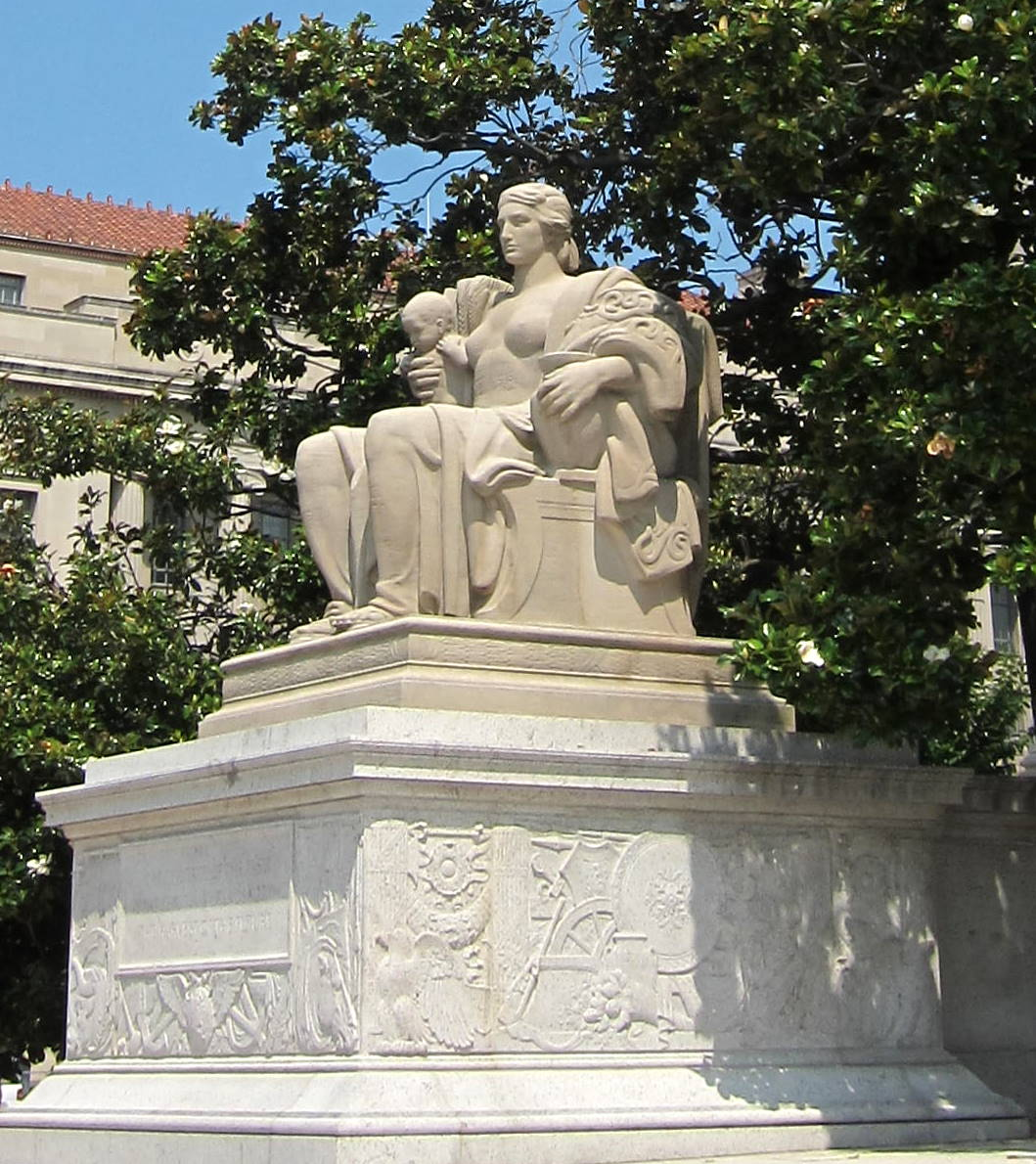
Heritage by James Earle Fraser

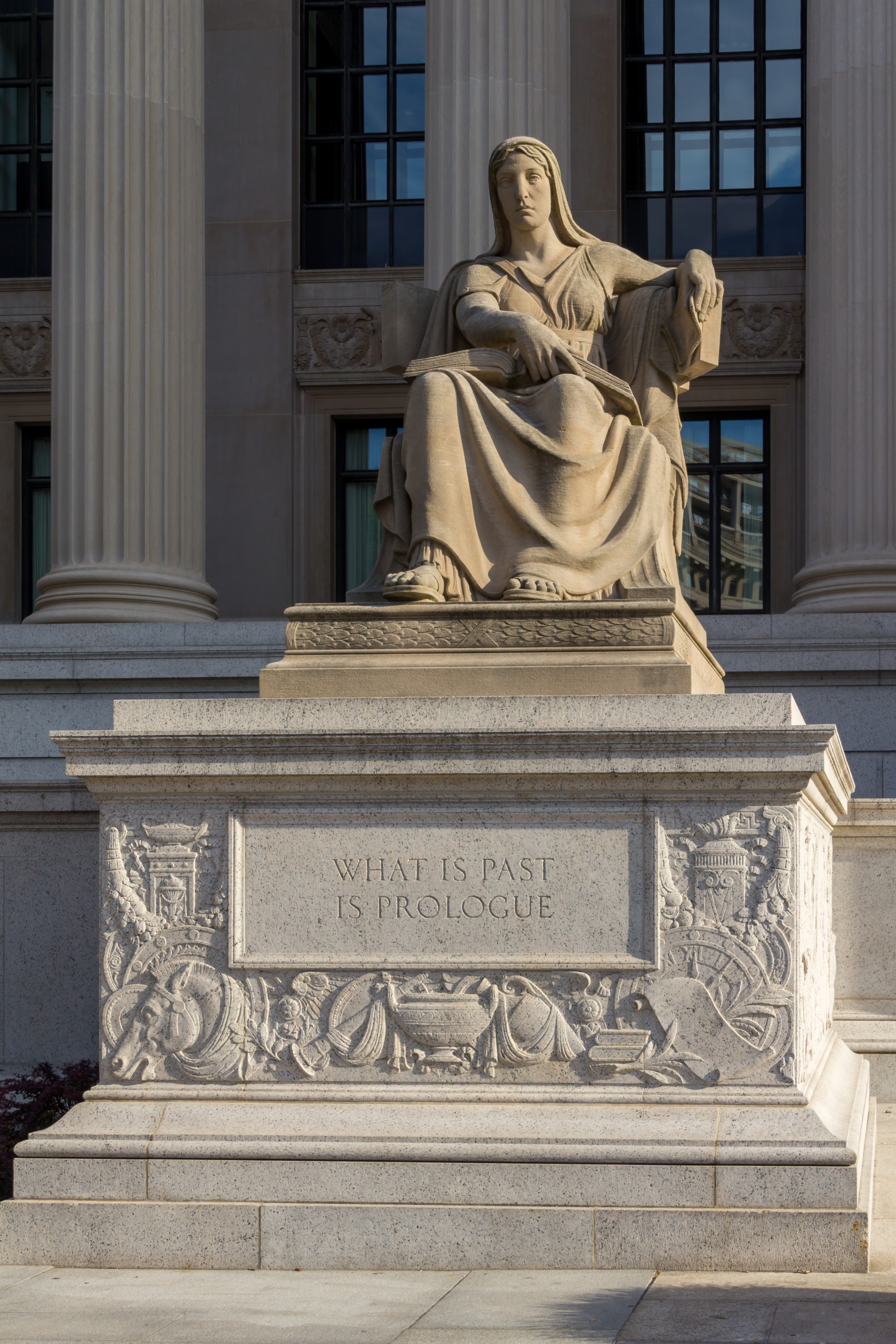
Future by Robert Aiken

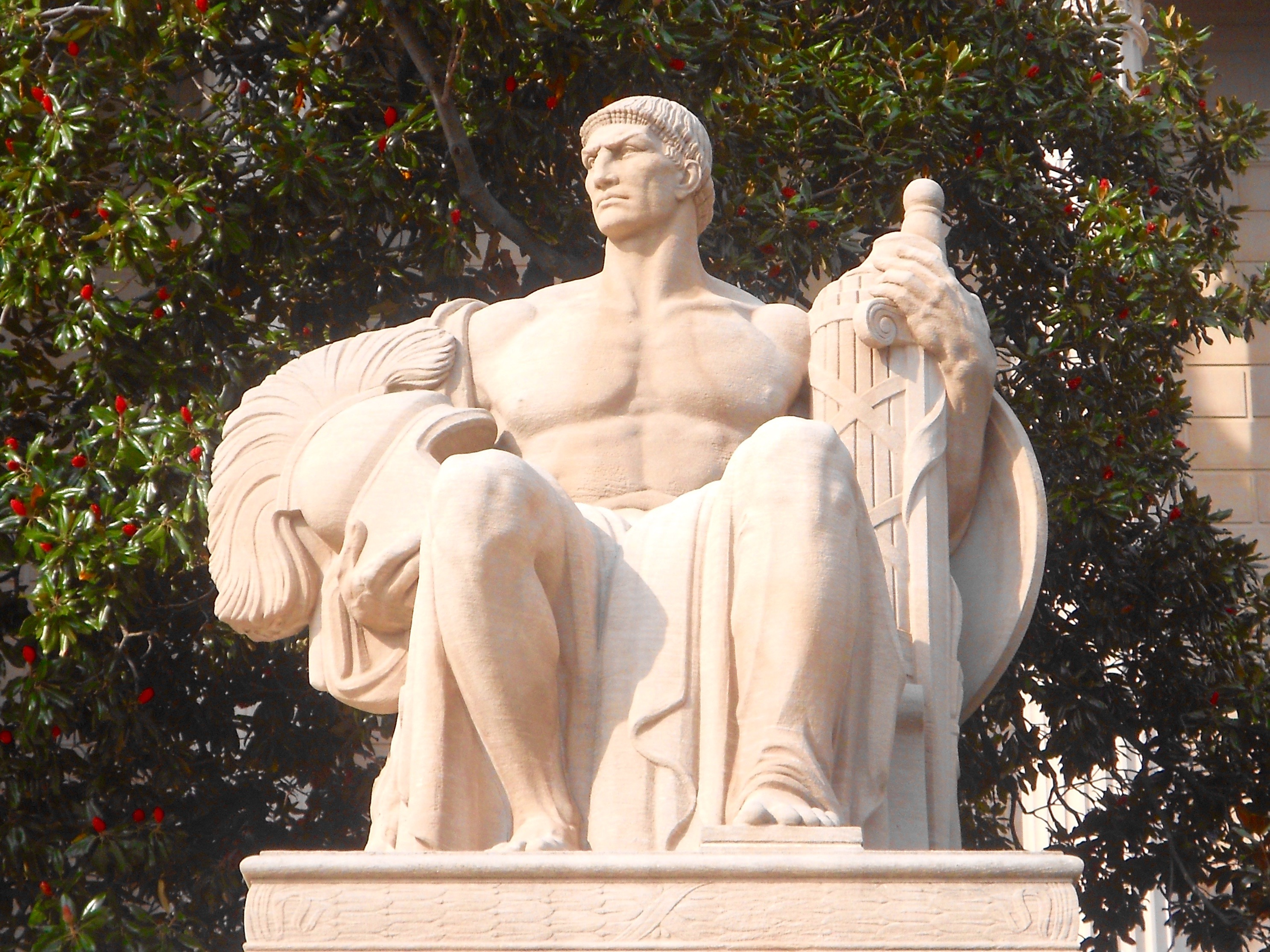
Guardianship by James Earle Fraser

Outside of the National Archives building stands four statues, carved from 1934–1935. The sculptors were most likely chosen by the designer of the National Archives building, Pope and the Commission on Fine Arts. They were carved from large slabs of limestone, shipped to DC from Indiana on specifically designed flatcars. Two are on the south side of the building and two are on the north at the two main entrances of the building. These statues weigh 65-tons each and measure 10 ft (3.0 m) tall, 25 ft (7.6 m) with the pedestals. The statues to the north are of an old man, titled Past, and a young woman, titled Future or Present by Robert Aiken, assisted by Attilio Piccirilli. The man's pedestals is inscribed with "Study the Past," quoting Confucius, and the woman's with "What is Past is Prologue," from The Tempest. At the base of the woman's feet are symbols representing "arts and sciences" and at the man's feet, "symbols of strength and unity," according to a historian who works for the National Archives. The statues guarding the south entrance of the building are named Heritage and Guardianship. These were carved by James Earl Fraser, assisted by David Rubins, Sidney Waugh and carver Gino A. Ratti. Heritage depicts a woman with a child, a bundle of wheat, and an urn in her arms. These "[symbolize] the government's role in preserving the home." Inscribed in her pedestal is "The heritage of the past is the seed that brings forth the harvest of the future," a quote from Wendell Phillips, around which are symbols that represent "the importance of home." Guardianship is of a muscular man who holds a sword and a plumed helmet in the Roman style. His pedestal says, "Eternal Vigilance is the Price of Liberty,” which comes from Thomas Jefferson, around which are different symbols of war.

There are additional sculptures in the pediments of the building showing figures that represent history, inspiration, destiny, and guardianship.

== Warren Commission ==
Investigating the assassination of John F. Kennedy, the Warren Commission met formally for the first time on December 5, 1963 in a hearing room on the second floor of the National Archives Building.

== Images ==
Major documents in the National Archives
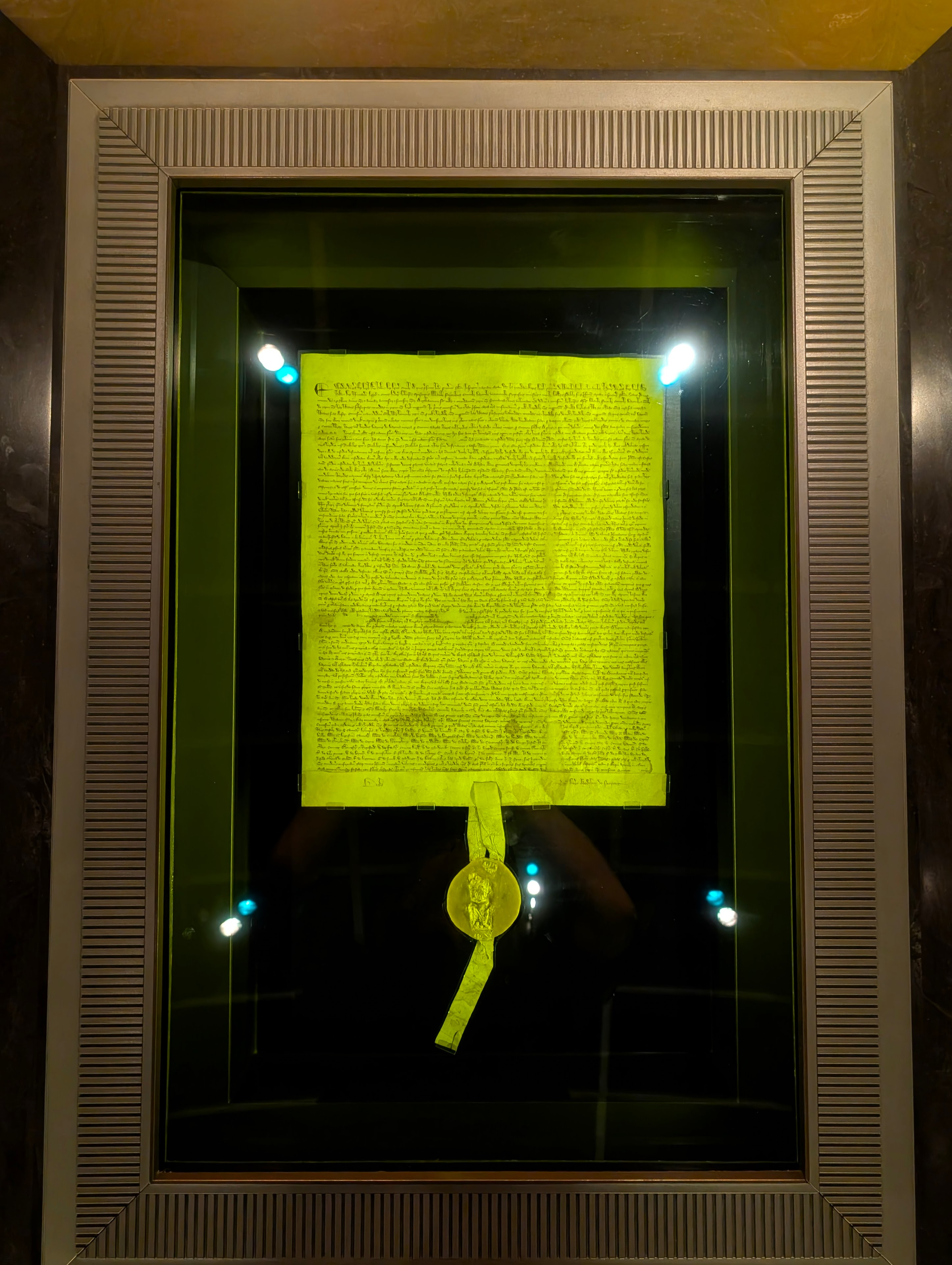
Magna Carta

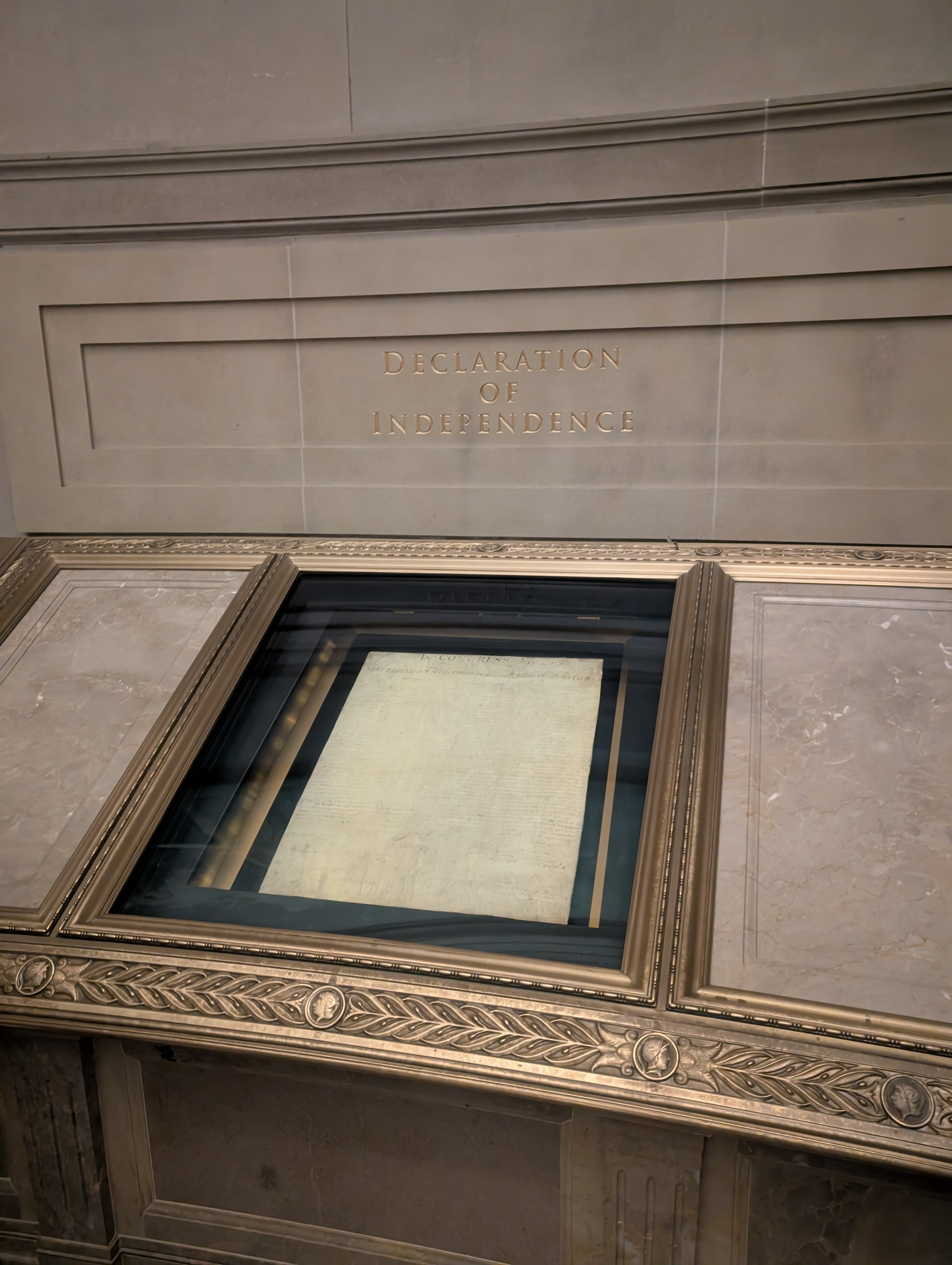
Declaration of Independence

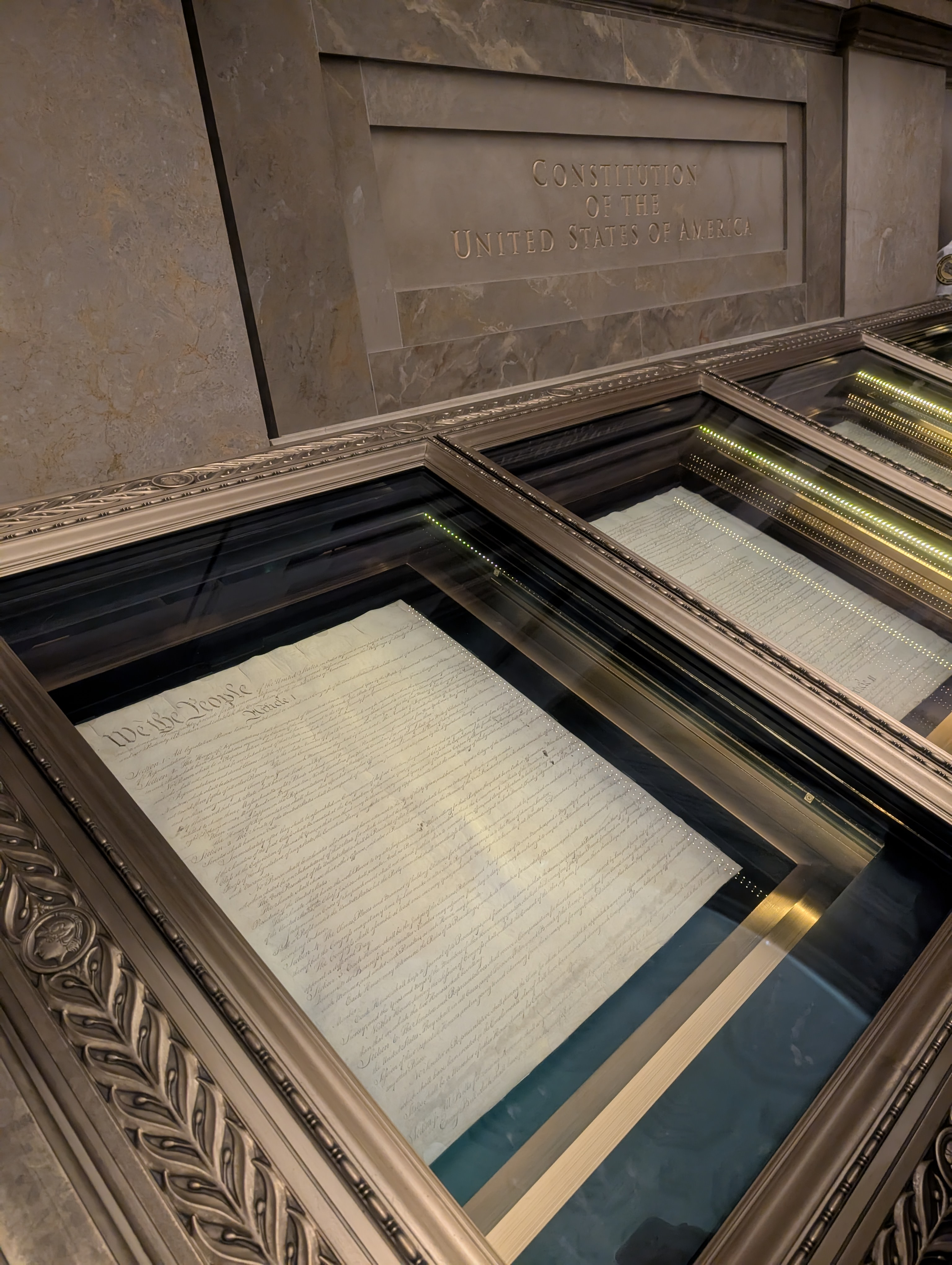
Constitution of the United States

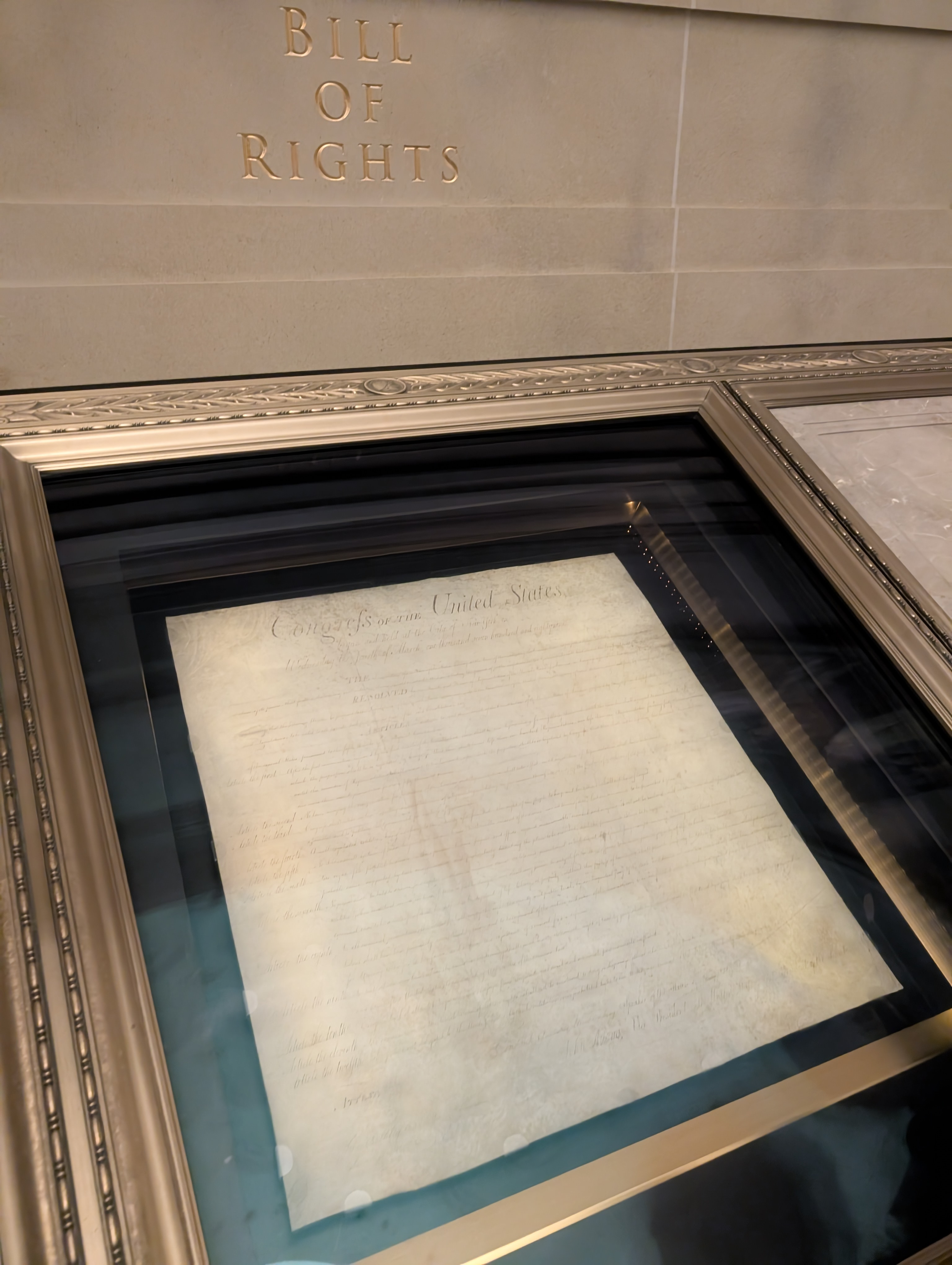
Bill of Rights

== In popular culture ==
- A section of the 2004 film National Treasure takes place in the National Archives Building, where the Declaration of Independence is featured being stolen from.
- The building appears in the 2008 videogame Fallout 3. Inside it, a powdered wig-wearing robot, believing itself to be the Founding Father Button Gwinnett, can be found guarding the Declaration of Independence.

== See also ==
- Architecture of Washington, D.C.
- National Register of Historic Places listings in central Washington, D.C.
- List of National Historic Landmarks in Washington, D.C.
