= Bálint Kenyeres =

Hungarian film director and screenwriter

- Born: 1976 (age 49–50); Budapest, Hungary
- Education: University of Theatre and Film Arts in Budapest
- Occupations: Director, screenwriter
- Years active: 1999–present

Bálint Kenyeres (born 1976) is a Hungarian film director and screenwriter. His short film Before Dawn won the European Film Award for Best Short Film in 2006 and received a Special Mention from the Short Film Jury at the Sundance Film Festival. His films have been selected three times in Cannes Film Festival programmes: Before Dawn screened in the Cannes Short Film Palme d'Or competition in 2005, The History of Aviation screened in the Directors' Fortnight section in 2009, and The Spectacle was selected for the Cannes Short Film Palme d'Or competition in 2025.

Kenyeres is a founding member of the London-based production company Assembly Collective.

== Early life and education ==
Kenyeres was born in Budapest, Hungary in 1976. He studied philosophy, film history and film theory before graduating from the University of Theatre and Film Arts in Budapest in 2006 with a degree in film directing. Following his graduation he became a member of the European Film Academy.

== Career ==
=== Short films ===
Kenyeres began directing short films in the late 1990s. His film Closing Time (Hungarian: Zárás, 1999) premiered at the Venice Film Festival.

His short film Before Dawn (2005) premiered in the short film competition at the Cannes Film Festival. The film depicts, in a single continuous 35mm shot, people rising from a field of wheat to be collected by a van before a Special Forces ambush takes place. It won the European Film Award for Best Short Film in 2006 and received a Special Mention from the Short Film Jury at the Sundance Film Festival.

Kenyeres returned to Cannes in 2009 with the short film The History of Aviation, which screened in the Directors’ Fortnight programme. The film follows a young girl walking along seaside cliffs while, in the sky above, a forgotten moment from aviation history unfolds.

In 2025, his short film The Spectacle, about a boy with supernatural abilities who lives in a small village just outside Budapest, was selected for the Cannes short film competition.

=== Feature films ===
Kenyeres directed his first feature film, Hier, starring Vlad Ivanov, which premiered at the Locarno Film Festival in 2018. The film was an international co-production involving companies from Hungary, Germany, France, the Netherlands, Sweden and Morocco. The film follows a man pursuing a hallucinatory obsession through Morocco.

== Filmography ==
Year	Title	Role			Description	Notes
Year	Title	Director	Writer	Producer	Description	Notes
1999	Closing Time (Zárás)	Yes	Yes	Yes	Short film	Premiered at the Venice Film Festival
2000	Teleplay (Tévéjáték)	Yes	Yes	Yes	Short film	Early short film project
2005	Before Dawn	Yes	Yes	Yes	Short film	European Film Award – Best Short Film; Cannes Film Festival Short Film Palme d'Or Competition; Sundance Film Festival Short Film Jury Award Honorable Mention
2009	The History of Aviation	Yes	Yes	Yes	Short film	Directors' Fortnight selection at the Cannes Film Festival
2018	Hier	Yes	Yes	Yes	Feature film	Premiered at the Locarno Film Festival
2025	The Spectacle	Yes	Yes		Short film	Cannes Film Festival Short Film Palme d'Or Competition selection

== Selected awards and recognition ==
- Venice Film Festival – Premiere – Closing Time (1999)
- Cannes Film Festival – Short Film Palme d'Or Nomination – Before Dawn (2005)
- European Film Award for Best Short Film – Before Dawn (2006)
- Sundance Film Festival – Short Film Jury Award (Honorable Mention) – Before Dawn (2006)
- Sarajevo Film Festival – Heart of Sarajevo for Best Short Film – Before Dawn (2006)
- Directors' Fortnight – Official Selection – The History of Aviation (2009)
- Locarno Film Festival – Premiere – Hier (2018)
- Cannes Film Festival – Short Film Palme d'Or Nomination – The Spectacle (2025)
