= Every Now and Then =

Every Now and Then may refer to:

- "Every Now and Then" (Brenda Lee song), a 1981 song by Brenda Lee
- "Every Now and Then"' a 1929 song written by Don McNamee; King Zany; P M Griffith
- "Every Now and Then", a 1935 popular song written by Al Sherman, Al Lewis and Abner Silver
- "Every Now and Then", a song by Mac Davis from 1976
- "Every Now and Then", a song by Garth Brooks from The Chase
- "Every Now and Then", a song by Earth, Wind and Fire from Touch the World
- "Every Now and Then", a song by Girls Aloud from the greatest hits album Ten
- "Every Now and Then", a song by the Noisettes from Wild Young Hearts
- Every Now and Then: Songs of Townes Van Zandt & Blaze Foley, an album by Blaze Foley, or the title song
- "Every Now and Then", a song by Santana from Dance of the Rainbow Serpent

== See also ==
- Now and Then (disambiguation)
- Then and Now (disambiguation)
