= Then and Now (song) =

1954 release as a Coral 45, 9-61336.

"Then and Now" is a song co-written and recorded by Paul Whiteman in 1954. The song was released as a Coral Records single in 1955.

== Background ==
"Then and Now" was recorded on December 7, 1954, and released in 1955 on Coral Records, was composed by Paul Whiteman with Dick Jacobs and Bob Merrill. The song was released as a 45 rpm single in 1955 as Coral 61336 backed with "Mississippi Mud" by Paul Whiteman and His New Ambassador Orchestra with the New Rhythm Boys.

The song was also released in the UK on Vogue as Q72064 in March 1955 as a 7-inch 45 rpm vinyl single backed with "Mississippi Mud".

The title was a play on Paul Whiteman's 1939 release "Now and Then" on Decca Records as 2417.

== Sources ==
- Paul Whiteman: Pioneer of American Music (Volume 1: 1890–1930), Studies in Jazz, No. 43, by Don Rayno, The Scarecrow Press, Inc., 2003.
- Pops: Paul Whiteman, King of Jazz, by Thomas A. DeLong, New Century Publishers, 1983.
- Jazz by Paul Whiteman, J. H. Sears, 1926.
- How To Be A Band Leader by Paul Whiteman and Leslie Lieber, Robert McBride & Company, 1948.
