= Earth Dragon =

Earth Dragon may refer to:

- "Earth Dragon" is the literal English translation for the "Mogera wogura" (土竜 or コウベモグラ), the Japanese mole.
- Earth Dragon (Chinese Zodiac)
- Dilong, a Chinese dragon.
- Earth Dragon (Greyhawk), a deity in the Greyhawk campaign setting for the Dungeons & Dragons fantasy role-playing game
