= Now and Then =

Now and Then or Now & Then may refer to:

== Film and television ==
- Now and Then (TV series), a 1983–84 British sitcom starring Bernard Holley, Jill Kerman and Marc Gilbey
- Now and Then (film), a 1995 comedy-drama
- Now and Then (The Price Is Right), former name of active game on The Price Is Right, "Now or Then"
- Now and Then, a 1979 Australian film starring Tony Barry
- The Now and Then Show, an American television program

== Literature ==
- Now and Then, a one-act play by David Campton
- Now and Then (Joseph Heller book), a 1998 memoir by Joseph Heller
- Now and Then (novel), in the Spenser series by Robert B. Parker
- Now and Then: The Poems of Gil Scott-Heron, a book of poems by Gil Scott-Heron
- Now and Then, a novel by Robert Penn Warren
- Now and Then, a novel by Samuel Warren
- Now and Then: a memoir of vocation, a partial autobiography by Frederick Buechner

== Music ==
=== Albums ===
- Now & Then (The Carpenters album), 1973
- Now and Then (Chris de Burgh album), 2008
- Now and Then (Smokey Robinson album), 2010
- Now... and Then, an album by Jake Thomas, 2006
- Now and Then (Ernestine Anderson album), 1993
- Now and Then (Michelle Wright album), 1992
- Now & Then (Janie Fricke album), 1993
- Now and Then (The Rowans album), 2004
- Now & Then (Damien Leith album), 2012
- Now and Then (South African series), an anthology album, followed by a second volume
- Now & Then, album by Aaron Tippin
- Now & Then, an album by Buckner & Garcia
- Now & Then, album by Skinnerbox

=== Songs ===
- "Now & Then", a 1968 song by Gary Puckett & The Union Gap
- "Now and Then", a 1975 song by Gordon Lightfoot
- "Now and Then', a 1993 Pete Townshend song
- "Now and Then" (Karen Staley song), 1994
- "Now & Then", a 1994 song by Lynsey De Paul
- "Now and Then" (The Superjesus song), 1998
- "Now and Then", a 1999 song by Blackmore's Night from Under a Violet Moon
- "Now & Then", a 2008 song by Algebra
- "Now and Then" (Beatles song), 2023 (from a John Lennon original piano demo dating from ~1977)

== See also ==
- Now and Then, Here and There, a Japanese anime series
- Every Now and Then (disambiguation)
- Then and Now (disambiguation)
- Now and "Them", 1968 studio album by Them
