= Today (1960 TV program) =

1960–1961 Australian breakfast TV series

- Genre: Breakfast television
- Presented by: Barry McQueen; Hal Todd
- Country of origin: Australia
- Original language: English

Production
- Running time: 60 minutes; 90 minutes (Saturdays)

Original release
- Network: GTV-9
- Release: 23 July 1960 – 1961

Related
- In Melbourne Today

Today is an Australian television series which aired from 23 July 1960 to 1961 on Melbourne station GTV-9. The series was originally hosted by Barry McQueen. By August 1960, McQueen had departed from both Today and GTV-9 owing to having disagreements about the show as well as "other matters, not connected with money". Most episodes were hosted by Hal Todd, for whom the role was his inaugural major television role. It was a morning series aired at 7:30AM, and running for 60 minutes (90 minutes on Saturdays). It included news, weather and exercise instruction. Following the end of the series, Hal Todd began hosting Toddy Time. Following the end of the series, GTV-9 stopped offering morning programming for several years. Previously, it had aired In Melbourne Today in a morning time-slot on Saturdays from 1957 to 1958.

== Reception ==
Reviewing the first two episodes, The Age gave it a mixed review, saying that "Today showed some entertaining segments" but also stated that "Today didn't flow as smoothly as such programmes are required to flow".
