= Today Newspapers =

Chain of newspapers serving communities in Texas, US

Today Newspapers were a chain of newspapers that served several suburban communities in southern Dallas County, Texas (USA), including Cedar Hill, DeSoto, Duncanville, and Lancaster (also known as the Best Southwest region) as well as Grand Prairie.

== History ==
Today Newspapers, Inc. was initially known as Suburban Publishers when it was established in 1960. The first issue of the Duncanville Suburban was published on August 5, 1960. In the late 1960s, the company began to expand by either starting or buying newspapers in the neighboring suburbs south of Dallas. The Duncanville Suburban was started by Royce Brown that flourished into other starts or purchases of small weekly newspapers in joining towns that became a group that included the Cedar Hill Chronicle, The Desoto News and Advertiser, The Midlothian News and Reporter, The Lancaster News, The Ferris Wheel and the Red Oak Rambler. A print shop was set up in a building behind the Duncanville Suburban at the 320 N. Main location. What became the Suburban Publishers competed against 49 other publications that unsuccessfully tried to move into this area including independent spin offs from Dallas Times Herald and Belo's Suburban News from 1960 until the Browns sold the weekly newspaper chain in 1985. Royce Brown's weekly column "Little 'd'" was his weekly opinions about Duncanville that was a prominent piece of the Duncanville Suburban. It said that many ghost writers on the editorial staff contributed to Little d, especially just after Royce suffered a massive stroke in 1980 that would eventually contribute to the sale of the publications. Royce and his wife Lillian Brown sold the company to Bluebonnet Media in 1985. The new owners sold the company to Sutherland Media in December 1987. Sutherland filed for bankruptcy less than a year later, and operation of the company passed to the Dallas Times Herald. In December 1991, it was sold to Richard H. Collins, who later acquired a monthly tabloid in 1995 and a religious publication in 2000. The Today identity was launched in January 1992. Robin Gooch and Kim Petty purchased the company from Collins in May 2006.

In recent years, the Today chain faced a combination of pressures common to other newspapers across the country, including a decline in sales and circulation. The national economic downturn also negatively impacted the company. Attempts reverse a loss in advertising revenue by increasing the cost of a single edition from .50 to .75 cents per issue while searching for a new buyer were unsuccessful. The final edition of the Today Newspaper was published on Thursday, July 2, 2009.

Today's closure leaves the Best Southwest region with only one print newspaper, the DeSoto-based Focus Daily News.

== Today family ==
Front page of the Lancaster Today newspaper, December 11, 2008.

Today Newspapers served a total of six communities at one time or the other. Each paper was independent and published weekly in the interest of its city. On Thursday, March 19, 2009, the Cedar Hill, DeSoto, Duncanville, and Lancaster Today papers were merged into a single edition. That arrangement lasted up until the closure of Today Newspapers in July 2009. Prior to the merger, the circulation figures for the individual papers were: Lancaster Today (4,200), Duncanville Today (2,450), Cedar Hill Today (1,642), and DeSoto Today (1,133).

- Cedar Hill Today
- Duncanville Today
- DeSoto Today
- Grand Prairie Today
  - Launched September 7, 2007.
- Lancaster Today
  - Ceased publication in December 2006. A Lancaster news section was added to the DeSoto Today paper.
  - Publication resumed in January 2008.
- Midlothian Today
  - Bought out by Waxahachie Newspapers, Inc. in May 2006 and ceased publication.

== See also ==
- List of newspapers in Texas
