= Yesterday (2018 film) =

- Directed by: Bálint Kenyeres
- Starring: Vlad Ivanov; Féodor Atkine; Jo Prestia; Johanna ter Steege; Toulou Kiki; Gamil Ratib; Isaka Sawadogo; Jacques Weber
- Release date: 13 September 2018
- Running time: 118 minutes
- Countries: Hungary; France; Netherlands; Morocco; Sweden; Germany
- Languages: French; English; Arabic

Yesterday an internationally co-produced Hungarian film directed by Bálint Kenyeres, made its debut as a feature film in 2018. The movie, titled Hier internationally, gained recognition as Kenyeres' inaugural venture into feature filmmaking.

== Premiere and release ==
The film premiered at the 2018 Locarno Film Festival. Its domestic presentation took place in Hungary on September 6 of the same year. Romanian actor Vlad Ivanov is the lead role. Ivanov, known for his work in acclaimed films such as 4 Months, 3 Weeks, 2 Days and Toni Erdmann, adds depth to the movie's storytelling.

== Production and recognition ==
Photographed by Ádám Fillenz and produced by Andrea Taschler, Yesterday stands as a collaborative effort involving Hungarian Mirage Film, French Films de l'Aprés-Midi, Dutch Rotterdam Films, German One Two Films, Swedish Chimney Pot and Film i Väst, and Moroccan La Prod. The film garnered accolades, including the Atelier Award for Best Screenplay at the Cannes International Film Festival in 2011. Additionally, it received a nomination for the Golden Leopard at the 2018 Locarno International Film Festival.
