= Toomorrow (soundtrack) =

Soundtrack album by Toomorrow
- Released: 1970
- Recorded: 1970
- Genre: Soundtrack; bubblegum pop
- Label: RCA
- Producer: Ritchie Adams; Mark Barkan

Olivia Newton-John chronology
Toomorrow (1970)	If Not for You (1971)

Toomorrow is the soundtrack album from the 1970 film, featuring the band Toomorrow with British-Australian singer Olivia Newton-John (her first major release album). The film was a sci-fi musical mix directed by Val Guest and was Newton-John's second movie. It was Don Kirshner's follow up to his work with The Monkees.

"You're My Baby Now" was released as a 7" single with picture sleeve on RCA Records, with "Goin' Back" on the B side.

== Production ==
According to Newton-John's biographer Tim Ewbank, Bruce Welch tried to rescue this album by bringing in new, but well- established British songwriters, to reconstruct a second version of this album. Due to the knock on effect this would have had on the film version, requiring substantial and costly re-filming this idea was shelved. A non-album follow up single by Toomorrow, "I Could Never Live Without Your Love", was released on Decca Records, produced by Welch.

== Track listing ==
All songs written by Ritchie Adams and Mark Barkan, except "Spaceport", composed by Hugo Montenegro.

1. "You're My Baby Now" (3:00)
2. "Taking Our Own Sweet Time" (3:04)
3. "Toomorrow" (instrumental) (2:07)
4. "Let's Move On" (2:20)
5. "Walkin' on Air" (instrumental) (2:13)
6. "If You Can't Be Hurt" (2:59)
7. "Toomorrow" (2:01)
8. "Walkin' on Air" (2:55)
9. "Spaceport" (2:44)
10. "Happiness Valley" (2:35)
11. "Let's Move On" (instrumental) (0:56)
12. "Goin' Back" (2:54)

== Personnel ==
- Olivia Newton-John – vocals
- Karl Chambers – drums
- Ben Thomas – guitar, vocals
- Vic Cooper – organ, piano, saxophone, guitar, recorder

== 2014 release on compact disc ==
Toomorrow was released on compact disc in 2014 by Ohio-based label Real Gone Music.
