= Today (EP) =

EP by Everlast
- Released: November 16, 1999
- Genre: Hip hop; alternative rock; blues
- Label: Tommy Boy
- Producer: Dante Ross; John Gamble; Jeanne de Sanctis

Everlast chronology
| Whitey Ford Sings the Blues (1998) | Today (1999) | Eat at Whitey's (2000) |

Professional ratings
Review scores
| Source | Rating |
|---|---|
| AllMusic | 1.5/5 stars |

Today is an extended play by American musician Everlast. It was released on November 16, 1999, via Tommy Boy Records.

== Track listings ==
=== Worldwide 8-track edition ===
1. Today (Watch Me Shine) Remix
2. Put Your Lights On (feat. Carlos Santana)
3. What It's Like (Live)
4. Jump Around (Live)
5. Only Love Can Break Your Heart
6. Some Nights (Are Better Than Others)
7. Hot to Death (Live)
8. Blues for X'Mas

=== Japan 9-track edition ===
1. Today (Watch Me Shine) Remix
2. Put Your Lights On (feat. Carlos Santana)
3. What It's Like (Live)
4. Jump Around (Live)
5. Only Love Can Break Your Heart
6. Some Nights (Are Better Than Others)
7. Hot to Death (Live)
8. Blues for X'Mas
9. Today (Exclusive Remix for Japan)

=== US 5-track edition ===
1. Today (Watch Me Shine) Remix
2. Put Your Lights On feat. Carlos Santana
3. What It's Like (Live)
4. Jump Around (Live)
5. Blues For X'Mas
