= Then and Now (retailer) =

London-based internet retailer

THEN AND NOW
- Company type: Privately owned company
- Industry: Online fashion retail
- Founder: Lian Michelson
- Headquarters: London, United Kingdom
- Area served: World Wide
- Products: Designer Clothing, Designer Handbags, Designer Shoes, Designer Accessories
- Website: https://www.thenandnowshop.com/

Then and Now (also Then and Now Shop) is a London-based Internet retailer that sells past season designer clothes and accessories at substantial discounts, as well as current-season items from designer names.

== History ==
Then and Now was established in Farringdon in December 2011 by Lian Michelson, a former Morgan Stanley trader. The original inspiration for the site came about when Michelson noticed an absence of discounted menswear online, although the site was established to offer both men's and women's clothing and accessories.

== Range ==
The luxury goods retailer gets its name from selling past seasons' clothes at discounts of up to 75 per cent, as well as current designer collections. These include established brands such as Yves Saint Laurent and newer names such as Rick Owens. The range includes website exclusives, such as beauty goods from Essie and fashion from Eugene Lin. The site works in partnership with other retailers to supply ranges for women, men, children and home.
