= Toomorrow (film) =

1970 British film by Val Guest

- Original UK quad poster
- Directed by: Val Guest
- Written by: Val Guest
- Produced by: Don Kirshner; Harry Saltzman
- Starring: Olivia Newton-John; Benny Thomas; Vic Cooper; Karl Chambers; Roy Dotrice
- Cinematography: Dick Bush
- Edited by: Julien Caunter; Alan Osbiston
- Music by: Ritchie Adams; Mark Barkan; Hugo Montenegro
- Production company: Lowndes Productions Limited
- Distributed by: Rank Organization
- Release date: 27 August 1970
- Running time: 95 minutes
- Country: United Kingdom
- Language: English

Toomorrow is a 1970 British science fiction musical film directed and written by Val Guest and starring Olivia Newton-John.

== Plot ==
"John Williams" is an alien Alphoid, who has adopted human form and lived on earth for millennia. Galactic Control instructs him to investigate a strange vibration they have detected coming from planet Earth. The sound is being produced by Olivia and her pop band "Toomorrow", from sonic vibrations emitted by their special amplifier, a "tonaliser". Williams abducts the group and has them entertain the Alphoid population on his home planet. When the group returns to Earth, Olivia wakes up and remembers a strange dream.

== Cast ==
- Olivia Newton-John as Olivia
- Benny Thomas as Benny
- Vic Cooper as Victor, "Vic"
- Karl Chambers as Karl
- Roy Dotrice as John Williams
- Tracey Crisp as Suzanne Gilmore
- Imogen Hassall as Amy
- Margaret Nolan as Johnson
- Roy Marsden as Alpha
- Carl Rigg as Matthew
- Maria O'Brien as Françoise
- Stuart Henry as compere
- David Lodge as policeman
- Diane Keen as music student
- Maxine Casson as art student
- Shakira Caine as Karl's friend

== Production ==
James Bond film producer Harry Saltzman entered into a three-picture deal with Don Kirshner. Kirshner had been the initial producer of the musical output from the Monkees. However, according to director Val Guest, Kirshner and Saltzman grew to loathe each other during the increasingly troubled production.

According to Billboard, filming was set to begin in London on 8 April 1969. United Artists planned to distribute the film, which was noted as the first in a series of Toomorrow films. Tie-in products were initially expected to generate $75 million in revenue.

Saltzman hired novelist David Benedictus to write the first draft, but after 30 pages neither Saltzman nor Guest felt it was working. Guest conceded that it was "very well written, but a little bit too 'high-faluting'". Saltzman advised Guest to write a new script. However, unbeknownst to Guest, Saltzman never informed Benedictus. Only during production did Benedictus learn that a new script had been commissioned.

Guest says casting Olivia Newton-John was Saltzman's idea.

I was very taken with Livy [Olivia], I thought she had everything going for her in this fresh bubbly way; she was worried about filming, but she got into it pretty soon. [Don] Kirshner wanted Livy to have a love scene in it and Harry came to tell me about this and I spoke to Livy and she went berserk! She didn’t want a love scene, it wasn’t that sort of a picture and “No I can’t.” In fact she burst into tears about it... She was very unhappy about it and finally, we never did the love scene. But all through it was quite obvious that Livy was going places because she was bubbling, bouncy, was quite a looker, it was obvious that she [was as] cute as a button, was going places.

Guest said in an interview: "That was Harry Saltzman’s great idea. That was the first space musical."

== Lawsuit ==
Guest had been working on the film for six months beyond the time specified for in his contract and still hadn't been paid, nor had anyone else who worked on the film. Saltzman didn't have the money nor did his company "Sweet Music" which was in Switzerland. Guest waited until after the film's premiere at the London Pavilion to obtain an injunction. The film could not be shown until Guest and the other people who worked on the film were paid. According to Guest in 1994, he still had not been paid and the injunction was still in effect.

As a result, the film, which took about two years to make, was shown (in the London Pavilion, then a cinema) for only one week, then was shelved. Aside from isolated showings in the British forces cinemas during 1971 and early 1972 on British military bases along with a copy in a travelling cinema in Scotland, and one showing in Los Angeles in 2000, Toomorrow was not seen in public for over four decades. The BFI released the film in the UK on Blu-ray in June 2026.

== Reception ==
The Monthly Film Bulletin wrote: "Harry Saltzman's extravagance (wide-open sets and sub-2001 effects) and Don Kirshner's fixed conception of young people's tastes in entertainment ... combine to produce a glossy and empty-headed pop fantasy, as computerised as the Alphoids' soulless music. To avoid any comparisons with his previous creation, The Monkees, Kirshner's new supergroup of four includes a winsome starlet and a token negro. They appear as incompatible as one would expect, and are required to do little else than try to put conviction into lines like 'Hey! Any of you cats mind a groove? You got it', which crop up throughout. If this antiseptic crew had really dared to set foot on the stage of the Round House during a pop festival, dressed up like canaries and singing their cute songs of love and tears, they would have been booed, quite deservedly, off it again."

Kine Weekly wrote: "The mixture of modern pop-scene with ultra-modern space-fiction has been entertainingly mingled and presented with speed and certain touches of adult humour that sophisticate the otherwise juvenile atmosphere. The whole affair has been conceived and directed in a happy mood and the Alphoids, with their magical powers, are an intriguing invention. The four young people who make up the group. Toomorrow, Olivia Newton-John, Benny Thomas, Vic Cooper and Karl Chambers, all have pleasing personalities and appearance and put over several numbers. Roy Dotrice lends distinctions to the role of John Williams, the humanised Alohoid, and Margaret Nolan has great fun with an Alphoid called Johnson who is detailed to pose as a dumb blonde."

In a March 1971 edition of the British music magazine NME, Newton-John commented "Our film died a death and it was all a bit of a shambles. But it was a good experience".

Variety wrote: "As a yarn it's pretty contrived, but as an excuse for some reasonably tuneful music and for a frolic it gets by. Dotrice as the space man is a suave emcee to the proceedings but it's not the thesp at his best. The Toomorrow group is fresh and cleancut, with girl warbler Olivia Newton-John being particularly promising as a screen potential. Tracey Crisp, Imogen Hassall and a flock of other shapely birds are around to adorn the screen and tangle up romantic sidelines."

Writing in Filmink, Stephen Vagg called the film "a notorious flop".

The Radio Times Guide to Films gave the film 2/5 stars, writing: "A lightweight musical fantasy, the contrived plot is sweetened enormously by some sophisticated humour, extravagant production design and expert direction by genre doyen Val Guest."

Kim Newman wrote in Offbeat: British Cinema's Curiosities, Obscurities and Forgotten Gems: "The psychedelically bizarre sci-fi content (cue expensive effects work from John Stears) is no more important to the pop musical hijinx than, say, the space ambassador business used in the earlier British sci-fi pop musical Gonks Go Beat. Toomorrow is really a weirdly middle-aged attempt to make a 'happening' youth film built around a cobbled-together-for-this-movie group, and as concerned with student protest sit-ins (remember them?) as saving the Alphoid race. ... Toomorrow is inoffensive and has nothing to say, but remains a fascinating relic from that period when hopeless entertainment industry squares were trying to get hip and hook the affluent but disaffected youth audience. Costumes, hairstyles, aliens, spaceships, disco lights and student décor provide acute visual reminders of those precise two weeks (in September 1970) when the film was in cinemas."

== See also ==
- Toomorrow (soundtrack)
