= Not Today =

Not Today may refer to:

- "Not Today" (Mary J. Blige song), 2003
- "Not Today" (BTS song), 2017
- "Not Today" (Imagine Dragons song), 2016
- "Not Today", a song by Kelly Clarkson from My December
- "Not Today", a song by Twenty One Pilots from Blurryface
- "Not Today", a song by Alessia Cara from The Pains of Growing
- "Not Today", a song by Ms. Dynamite from Judgement Days
- "Not Today", a song by Dappy
- "Not Today," a song from The Addams Family (musical)

== See also ==
- Not Today, Thank You, a British radio comedy
- "Not Today, Satan"
