= Yesterday =

Yesterday or yesterdays usually refers to:

- Yesterday (time), the day prior to the current day

Yesterday can also refer to:

== Film and TV ==
=== Film ===
- Yesterday (1959 film), a Hungarian film
- Yesterday (1968 film), a documentary written and directed by Raúl daSilva
- Yesterday (1981 film), a romantic drama starring Vincent Van Patten
- Yesterday (1985 film), a Polish film
- Yesterday (1988 film), a Bulgarian drama film directed by Ivan Andonov
- Yesterday (2002 film), a South Korean science fiction drama directed by Yun-su Jeong
- Yesterday (2004 film), a Zulu-language South African drama directed by Darrell Roodt
- Yesterday (2018 film), a Hungarian drama film
- Yesterday (2019 film), a romantic comedy directed by Danny Boyle

=== Television and radio ===
- Yesterday (radio program), a musical radio program in the Philippines
- U&Yesterday, a British television channel, formerly known as UKTV History, then Yesterday
- "Yesterday" (12 Monkeys), a 2015 television episode
- "Yesterday" (Grey's Anatomy), a 2006 television episode
- "Yesterday" (Law & Order: Criminal Intent), a 2002 television episode

== Music ==
- Yesterdays (band), a Hungarian prog-rock band

=== Albums ===
- Yesterday (album), a 2015 album by Tyler Shaw,
- Yesterday (Beatles EP)
- Yesterday (Grave Digger EP)
- Yesterday (Xia EP)
- Yesterdays (Gato Barbieri album)
- Yesterdays (Keith Jarrett album)
- Yesterdays (Pennywise album)
- Yesterdays (Yes album)
- Yesterdays, by Shirley Bassey

=== Songs ===
- "Yesterday" (song), a 1965 Beatles single
- "Yesterday" (Black Eyed Peas song), 2015
- "Yesterday" (Toni Braxton song), a 2010 song from the album Pulse
- "Yesterday" (Shanice song), a 1999 song from the album Shanice
- "Yesterdays" (1933 song), from the musical Roberta by Jerome Kern and Otto Harbach
- "Yesterdays" (Guns N' Roses song), a 1992 song from the album Use Your Illusion II
- "Yesterday", by Ace Troubleshooter from the album Ace Troubleshooter
- "Yesterday", by Ashley Roberts (2012)
- "Yesterday", by Atmosphere from When Life Gives You Lemons, You Paint That Shit Gold
- "Yesterday", by Bad Religion from Back to the Known
- "Yesterday", by David Guetta featuring Bebe Rexha from Listen
- "Yesterday", by Grave Digger from Heavy Metal Breakdown
- "Yesterday", by Imagine Dragons from Evolve
- "Yesterday", by Karmin
- "Yesterday", by Lasgo from Far Away
- "Yesterday", by Leona Lewis from Spirit
- "Yesterday", by Mary Mary from the album Mary Mary
- "Yesterday", by Debelah Morgan from It's Not Over
- "Yesterday", by Staind from 14 Shades of Grey
- "Yesterday", by Geraint Watkins
- "Yesterday", by Tiësto a 2023 single from the album Drive
- "Yesterdays", by Michelle Chamuel
- "Yesterdays", by Pennywise from From the Ashes
- "Yesterdays", by Switchfoot from Oh! Gravity.

== Other ==
- Yesterday (horse), an Irish Thoroughbred racehorse and broodmare
- Yesterday (video game), a 2012 adventure game developed by Pendulo Studios
- Yesterday (Nog pas gisteren), a 1951 novel by Maria Dermoût
- "Yesterday", a storyline in the science fiction comedy webtoon series Live with Yourself!

== See also ==
- Yesterday and Today (disambiguation)
