= Tomorrow and tomorrow and tomorrow =

Soliloquy from Macbeth

MACBETH.
She should have died hereafter;
There would have been a time for such a word.
Tomorrow, and tomorrow, and tomorrow
Creeps in this petty pace from day to day
To the last syllable of recorded time;
And all our yesterdays have lighted fools
The way to dusty death. Out, out, brief candle!
Life's but a walking shadow, a poor player
That struts and frets his hour upon the stage
And then is heard no more. It is a tale
Told by an idiot, full of sound and fury
Signifying nothing.

— William Shakespeare, Macbeth, Act V, Scene V, lines 17–28

"Tomorrow and tomorrow and tomorrow" is the beginning of the second sentence of a soliloquy in William Shakespeare's tragedy Macbeth. It takes place in the beginning of the fifth scene of Act 5, during the time when the Scottish troops, led by Malcolm and Macduff, are approaching Macbeth's castle to besiege it. Macbeth, the play's protagonist, is confident that he can withstand any siege from Malcolm's forces. He hears the cry of a woman and reflects that there was a time when his hair would have stood on end if he had heard such a cry, but he is now so full of horrors and murderous thoughts that it can no longer startle him.

Seyton then tells Macbeth of Lady Macbeth's death, and Macbeth delivers this soliloquy as his response to the news. Shortly afterwards, he is told of the apparent movement of Birnam Wood towards Dunsinane Castle (as the witches had prophesied to him), which is actually Malcolm's forces having disguised themselves with tree branches so as to hide their numbers as they approach the castle. This sets the scene for the final events of the play and Macbeth's death at the hands of Macduff.
