= Yesterday and Today (disambiguation) =

Yesterday and Today is a 1966 album by the Beatles.

Yesterday and Today or Yesterday & Today may also refer to:

- Yesterday & Today (band), later Y&T, an American rock band
  - Yesterday and Today (Yesterday and Today album), 1976
- Yesterday & Today (Tokio album), 2000
- Yesterday and Today (The Field album), 2009
- "Yesterday & Today" (Do As Infinity song), 2000
- "Yesterday & Today", a song by Yes from the 1969 album Yes
- Yesterday and Today (film), 1953 film
- Kampung Boy: Yesterday and Today, a graphic novel

== See also ==
- Yesterday (disambiguation)
- Today (disambiguation)
