= Atemoztli =

Sixteenth month of the Aztec calendar

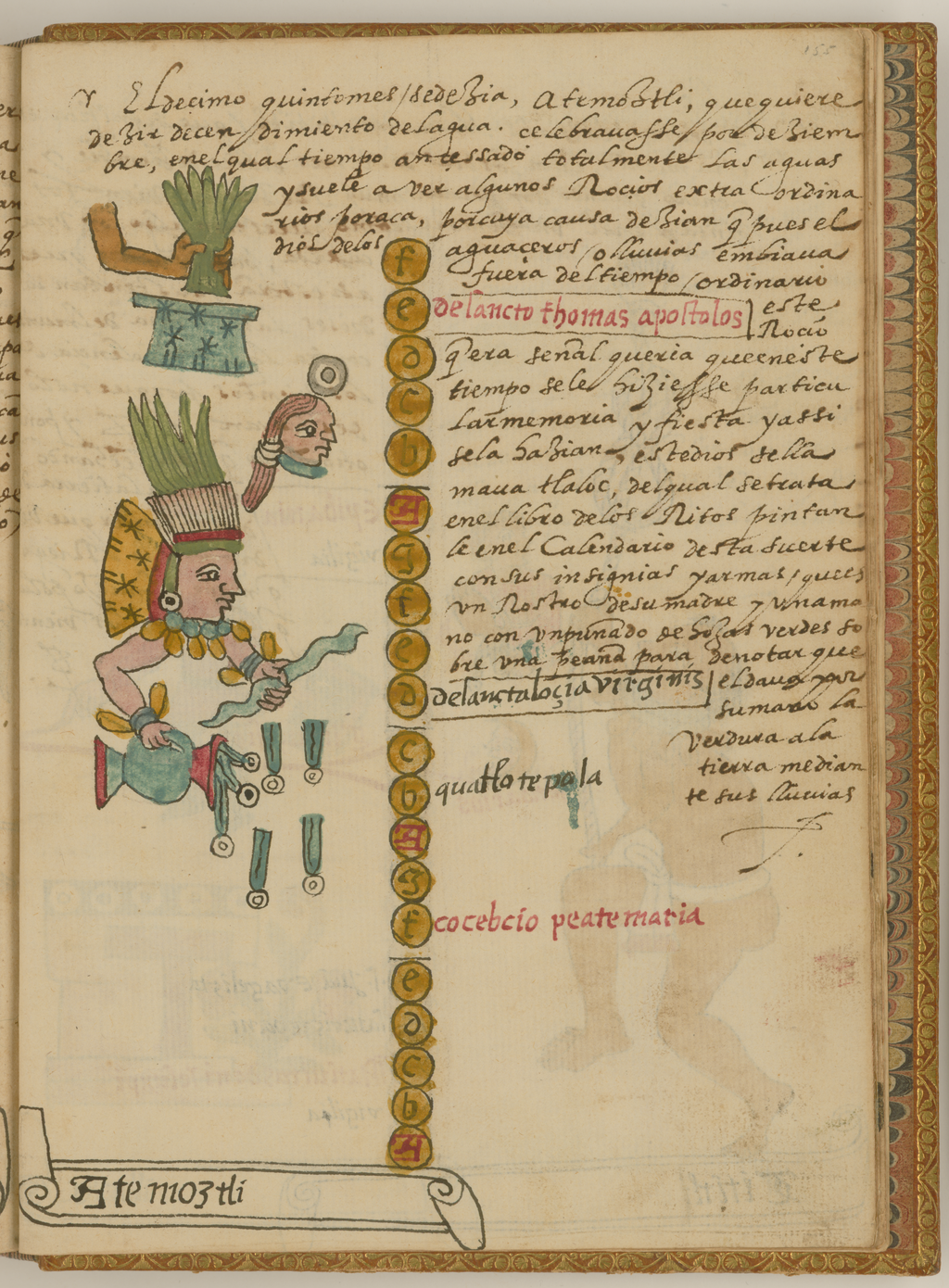

Atemoztli is the sixteenth month of the Aztec calendar. It is also a festival in the Aztec religion dedicated to Tlaloc and Tlaloque.

In the Otomi language, the festival was named Ancãndehe, meaning "descent of water", same as the Nahuatl name.
